= Ottavio Jemma =

Italian screenwriter

- Born: 1 January 1925; Salerno, Kingdom of Italy
- Died: 25 December 2015 (aged 90); Rome, Italy
- Occupation: Screenwriter
- Years active: 1959–2015

Ottavio Jemma (1 January 1925 – 25 December 2015) was an Italian screenwriter. He wrote for more than 40 films between 1959 and 2015, including The Libertine.

== Selected filmography ==
- Saul and David (1964)
- The Great Leaders (1965)
- Fantabulous Inc. (1967)
- The Libertine (1968)
- He and She (1969)
- The Fifth Day of Peace (1969)
- Where Are You Going All Naked? (1969)
- When Women Had Tails (1970)
- The Swinging Confessors (1970)
- Sacco e Vanzetti (1971)
- Secret Fantasy (1971)
- When Women Lost Their Tails (1972)
- The Eroticist (1972)
- Jus primae noctis (1972)
- Malicious (1973)
- La sbandata (1974)
- I'll Take Her Like a Father (1974)
- Lovers and Other Relatives (1974)
- The Sex Machine (1975)
- Submission (1976)
- Hitch-Hike (1977)
- Il corpo della ragassa (1979)
- The Good Thief (1980)
- La moglie in vacanza... l'amante in città (1980)
- Qua la mano (1980)
- Chaste and Pure (1981)
- I'm Starting from Three (1981)
- Culo e camicia (1981)
- Manolesta (1981)
- The Girl from Trieste (1982)
- Rich and Poor (1983)
- Mortacci (1989)
