= List of LGBTQ-related films of 1981 =

This is a list of lesbian, gay, bisexual, transgender or queer-related films released in 1981. It contains theatrically released films that deal with important gay, lesbian, bisexual, transgender or queer characters or issues and may have same-sex romance or relationships as a plot device.

== Films ==
Title	Director	Country	Genre	Cast	Notes
Caligula et Messaline	Bruno Mattei, Antonio Passalia, Jean-Jacques Renon	France; Italy	Action	Vladimir Brajovic, Betty Roland, Françoise Blanchard, Raul Cabrera, Gino Turini (credited as John Turner), Angelo Arquilla, Piotr Stanislas, Vincent Lo Monaco, Fanny Magier, Laurence Lovall, Antonio Passalia (credited as Anthony Pass), Dominique Irissou, Marie-Noëlle Arnoult, Silvie Dezabauneix and Kathy Sadik	
Chanel Solitaire	George Kaczender	United Kingdom; France; United States	Drama	Marie-France Pisier, Timothy Dalton, Rutger Hauer	Biographical film about Coco Chanel
Christiane F. – We Children from Bahnhof Zoo	Uli Edel	West Germany	Biography, drama	Natja Brunckhorst, Rainer Wölk, Jan Georg Effler, Christiane Reichelt, Daniela Jaeger, Kerstin Richter, David Bowie and Christiane Lechle	Based on the biographical book Zoo Station: The Story of Christiane F. about Christiane F.
Culo e camicia	Pasquale Festa Campanile	Italy	Comedy	Enrico Montesano, Daniela Poggi, Gianni Agus, Gino Pernice, Umberto Zuanelli, Ennio Antonelli, Renato Pozzetto, Leopoldo Mastelloni, Maria Rosaria Omaggio, Carlo Bagno and Carla Monti	
End of the Fame	Orhan Aksoy	Turkey	Drama, romance	Bülent Bilgiç, Ekrem Bora, Bülent Ersoy, Semsi Inkaya, Yusuf Sezgin and Serpil Çakmakli	a.k.a. Söhretin Sonu
Gay Club	Ramón Fernández	Spain	Comedy	Manuel Alexandre, Francisco Algora, Rafael Alonso, Amel Amor, Marciano Buendía, José María Caffarel, Fernando Calonje, José Manuel Cervino, Florinda Chico, Fernando Chinarro, José Luis Chinchilla, Luis Ciges, Rafael Conesa, Felix De Utrera and Paco España	
Nessuno è perfetto	Pasquale Festa Campanile	Italy	Comedy, drama, romance	Renato Pozzetto, Ornella Muti, Lina Volonghi, Felice Andreasi, Massimo Boldi and Gabriele Tinti	a.k.a. Nobody is perfect
The Running Man	Donald Brittain	Canada	Drama	Chuck Shamata, Barbara Gordon, Colm Feore, Kate Trotter	Episode of CBC Television anthology series For the Record
Sidney Shorr: A Girl's Best Friend	Russ Mayberry	United States	Drama	Tony Randall, Lorna Patterson	TV movie
Taxi zum Klo	Frank Ripploh	West Germany	Comedy	Frank Ripploh, Bernd Broaderup, Orpha Termin, Peter Fahrni, Hans-Gerd Mehrtens, Dieter Godde, Klaus Schnee, Bernd Kroger, Markus Voigtlander, Irmgard Lademacher, Gregor Becker, Marguerite Dupont, Eberhard Freudenthal, Beate Springer, Millie Büttner, Gitta Lederer and Toller Cranston	a.k.a. Taxi to the Toilet
El vicari d'Olot	Ventura Pons	Spain	Drama	Enric Majó, Enric Cusí, Maria Aurèlia Capmany, Marina Rossell, Núria Feliu, Carla Cristi, Marta May, Carmen Pérez (as Carme Pérez), Jordi Brau, Rosa Morata, Montserrat Carulla, Carles Lloret, Fernando Guillén, Antonio Rovira (as Antoni Rovira) and Mary Santpere	a.k.a. The Victor of Olot
Zorro, The Gay Blade	Peter Medak	United States	Comedy	George Hamilton, Lauren Hutton, Brenda Vaccaro, Ron Leibman, Donovan Scott, James Booth, Helen Burns, Clive Revill, Carolyn Seymour, Eduardo Noriega, Pilar Pellicer, Jorge Russek, Eduardo Alcaraz, Carlos Bravo y Fernández, Roberto Dumont, Jorge Bolio and Frank Welker	
