= Gino Pernice =

Italian stage, television and film actor

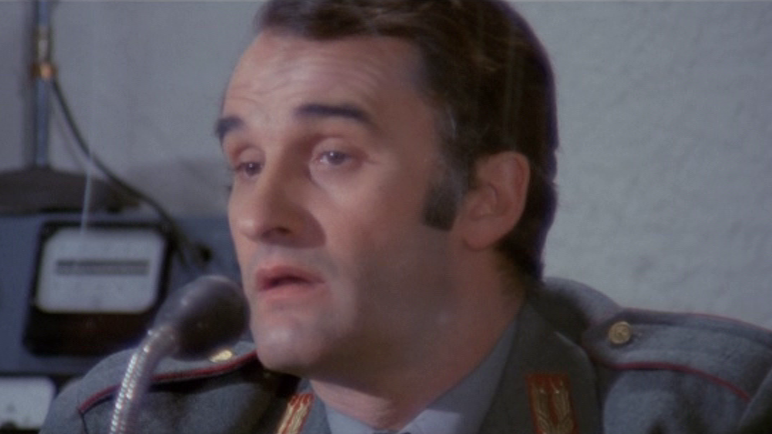
- Pernice in Io non spezzo... rompo (1971)
- Born: 6 May 1927; Milan, Italy
- Died: 25 April 1997 (aged 69); Rome, Italy
- Other name: Jimmy Douglas
- Occupation: Actor

Gino Pernice (6 May 1927 – 25 April 1997) was an Italian stage, television and film actor.

== Life and career ==
Born in Milan, Pernice trained at the Accademia dei Filodrammatici graduating in 1952, and made his professional debut with the stage company of Fantasio Piccoli at the Teatro Stabile of Bolzano. His breakthrough role was Tobia in a staging of Twelfth Night held by the De Lullo-Falk-Guarnieri-Valli's "Compagnia dei Giovani". Mainly active on stage, he also had an intense career as a character actor in films and TV-series.

== Selected filmography ==
- Carmela è una bambola (1958) - Douglas
- The Attic (1963)
- Torpedo Bay (1963)
- White Voices (1964) - The Singer with red suit
- Attack and Retreat (1964) - Collidi
- Minnesota Clay (1964) - Scratchy
- The Man Who Laughs (1966)
- Adultery Italian Style (1966) - Roberto
- Django (1966) - Brother Jonathan
- Texas, Adios (1966) - Bank Employee
- The Hellbenders (1967) - Jeff
- The Head of the Family (1967)
- Rita of the West (1968) - Tribunal President Joseph
- The Specialist (1969) - Cabot - Gambler
- Metello (1970) - Idina's Husband (uncredited)
- Compañeros (1970) - Tourneur
- Io non spezzo... rompo (1971) - Policeman from Liguria
- The Working Class Goes to Heaven (1971) - Sindacalista
- Er Più – storia d'amore e di coltello (1971) - Pietro Di Lorenzo
- Jus primae noctis (1972) - Marculfo
- Daniele e Maria (1973)
- Hospitals: The White Mafia (1973)
- The Gamecock (1974) - The Travelling Salesman of Encyclopedias
- Professore venga accompagnato dai suoi genitori (1974) - Police superintendent
- La sbandata (1974) - Carluzzo - card player
- The Sex Machine (1975) - Assistant
- Di che segno sei? (1975) - Il dottore
- Soldier of Fortune (1976) - Fanfulla da Lodi
- How to Lose a Wife and Find a Lover (1978) - Arturo - Eleonora's husband
- Il corpo della ragassa (1979) - Alberto Marengo
- Culo e camicia (1981) - Carletto Benedetti
- Porca vacca (1982)
- Spaghetti House (1982) - Valentino
- Secret Scandal (1990) - Paolo Morelli (final film role)
