= Enzo Robutti =

Italian actor and voice actor (1933–2022)

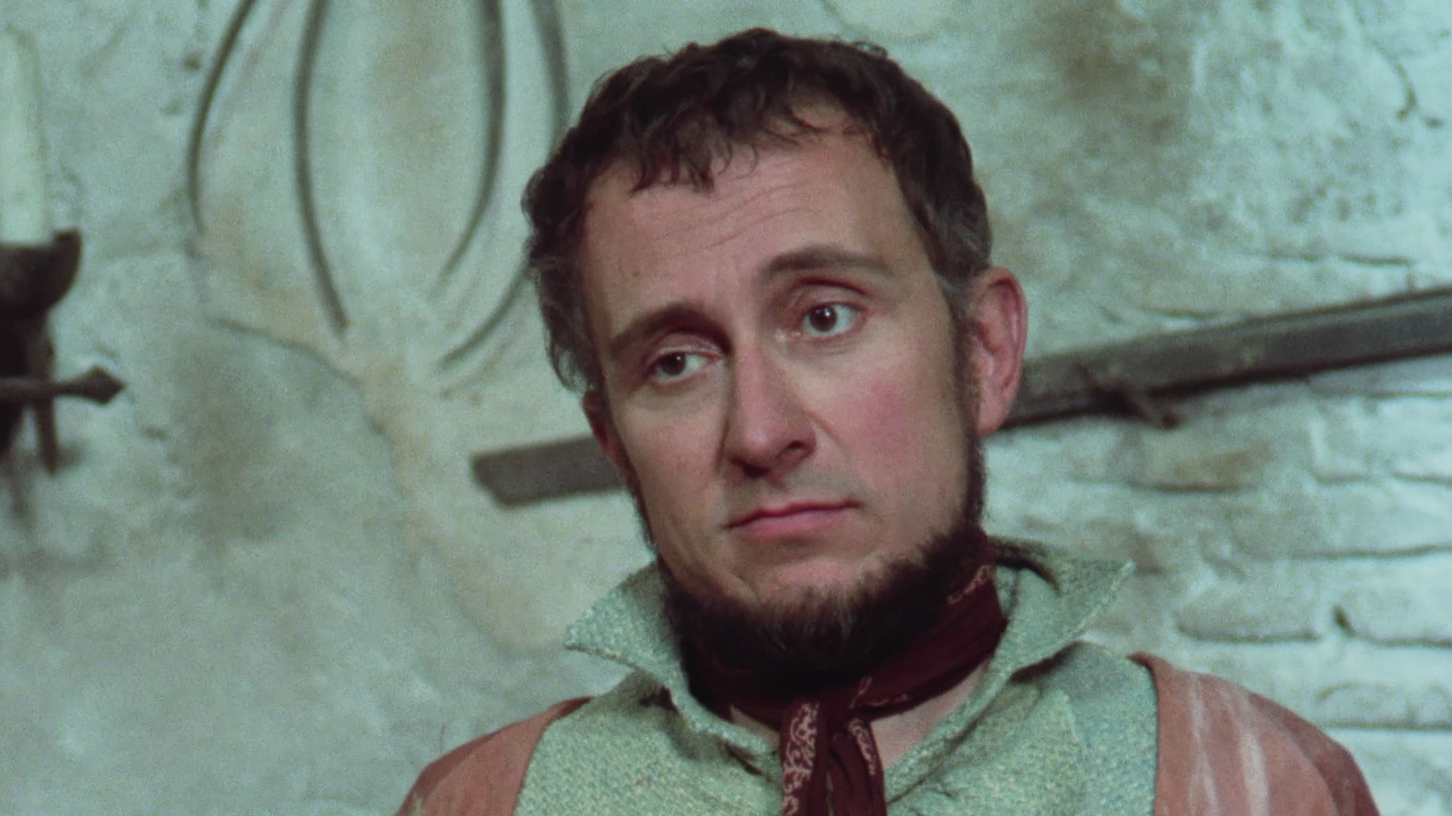
- Robutti in Rugantino (1973)
- Born: 24 October 1933; Bologna, Italy
- Died: 13 February 2022 (aged 88); Viterbo, Italy
- Occupation: Actor
- Height: 1.80 m (5 ft 11 in)

Enzo Robutti (24 October 1933 – 13 February 2022) was an Italian actor, voice actor, comedian, playwright, and writer.

== Life and career ==
Born in Bologna, Robutti attended the drama school of the Piccolo Teatro in Milan, and debuted on stage in the theatrical company of Vittorio Gassman in Irma la dolce. He got his early successes as a stand-up comedian and a cabaret author at the Derby Club in Milan. Robutti was also very active as a character film actor, often cast in comedies in roles of hysterical, chorelical characters. He often worked with Pasquale Festa Campanile.

== Selected filmography ==
- Outlaws of Love (1963)
- Mr. Kinky (1968) - Alberto
- Sardinia Kidnapped (1968)
- Fermate il mondo... voglio scendere! (1970) - Martora
- La torta in cielo (1970)
- Secret Fantasy (1971)
- Without Family (1972) - Malato
- The Hassled Hooker (1972) - Manca - Turrisi assistant in Rome
- Decameron nº 3 - Le più belle donne del Boccaccio (1972) - The Jealous Husband (segment "The Jealous Husband")
- Beati i ricchi (1972) - Direttore di banca
- Jus primae noctis (1972)
- Il generale dorme in piedi (1972) - Ten. Psichiatra Mancini
- Rugantino (1973) - Scultore
- Non ho tempo (1973) - Esaminatore
- The Lady Has Been Raped (1973) - Il professore
- L'ultimo uomo di Sara (1974) - Commesso viaggiatore
- Poker in Bed (1974) - Primo Guendalini - l'antiquario
- Don't Hurt Me, My Love (1974) - Laganà
- Il lumacone (1974) - Un cliente
- The Sex Machine (1975) - Matteis
- Down the Ancient Staircase (1975)
- Son tornate a fiorire le rose (1975) - Laganà - colleague of Paolo
- Dog's Heart (1976) - Il commissario
- Tell Me You Do Everything for Me (1976) - Felegatti
- Sturmtruppen (1976) - Lo psichiatra
- Puttana galera! (1976)
- Plot of Fear (1976) - Client with unfaithful wife
- Carioca tigre (1976) - Baltazar
- Che notte quella notte! (1977) - Giovane intellettuale
- The American Friend (1977) - Falling man (uncredited)
- L'occhio dietro la parete (1977)
- Wifemistress (1977) - Priest
- Grand hôtel des palmes (1977)
- L'anello matrimoniale (1977) - Shop keeper
- Il cappotto di Astrakan (1979) - Ramazzini
- Il ritorno di Casanova (1980)
- Il ladrone (1980) - Centurion
- Qua la mano (1980) - Benigno - friend of Fulgenzio
- La locanda della maladolescenza (1980)
- Sugar, Honey and Pepper (1980) - Commissario Milanese
- Mia moglie torna a scuola (1981) - Prof. Pier Capponi
- Pierino contro tutti (1981) - Il negoziante
- I carabbimatti (1981) - S.S.
- Forest of Love (1981)
- Pierino la peste alla riscossa! (1982) - Cliente della farmacia
- Il paramedico (1982) - Police Chief
- Pierino colpisce ancora (1982) - Professor Pomari
- Scusa se è poco (1982) - Ferrini
- Porca vacca (1982) - Capitano
- Bingo Bongo (1982) - Dr. Muller
- Gian Burrasca (1982) - Stanislao 'Calpurnio'
- Petomaniac (1983) - Giudice Istruttore
- A Proper Scandal (1984) - Director of the Asylum
- Mamma Ebe (1985) - Il vescovo
- 45º parallelo (1986)
- The Rogues (1987) - Capitano della nave
- Fratello dello spazio (1988)
- The Godfather Part III (1990) - Don Licio Lucchesi
- La cattedra (1991)
- Viola Kisses Everybody (1998) - Giotto
- Cucciolo (1998)
- Incontri proibiti (1988) - Federica's father
