= Più bello di così si muore =

- Directed by: Pasquale Festa Campanile
- Written by: Antonio Amurri; Ottavio Jemma
- Produced by: Luigi De Laurentiis; Aurelio De Laurentiis
- Starring: Enrico Montesano; Monica Guerritore
- Cinematography: Alfio Contini
- Edited by: Amedeo Salfa
- Music by: Riz Ortolani
- Release date: 1982
- Language: Italian

Più bello di così si muore is a 1982 Italian comedy film directed by Pasquale Festa Campanile and starring Enrico Montesano, Monica Guerritore and Ida Di Benedetto. It is based on the novel with the same name written by Antonio Amurri, who also collaborated to the screenplay.

== Cast ==
- Enrico Montesano as Spartaco Meniconi
- Monica Guerritore as Amelia
- Ida Di Benedetto as Ottavia
- Vittorio Caprioli as Count Nereo Di Sanfilippo
- Toni Ucci as Agenore
- Paola Borboni as Nereo's mother
- Franco Caracciolo as Marcella
- Nicola D'Eramo as Marcello

== See also ==
- List of Italian films of 1982
