= La costanza della ragione =

1964 film directed by Pasquale Festa Campanile

- Directed by: Pasquale Festa Campanile
- Written by: Fabio Carpi; Pasquale Festa Campanile
- Produced by: Nello Meniconi; Luciano Perugia
- Starring: Sami Frey; Catherine Deneuve
- Cinematography: Ennio Guarnieri
- Music by: Giorgio Zinzi
- Production companies: Franca (Roma); Societè Nouvelle De Cinematogrphie (Parigi)
- Distributed by: Cineriz
- Release date: 27 November 1964
- Running time: 88 minutes
- Country: Italy
- Language: Italian

La costanza della ragione is a 1964 drama film directed by Pasquale Festa Campanile, based on the homonymous novel by Vasco Pratolini and starring Sami Frey and Catherine Deneuve.

== Plot ==
Bruno, a young idealist, would like to be hired in a large company. His extremism hampers his intent. He falls in love with Lori, but after her death he discovers he has been betrayed. Bruno then rethinks to his orientation. After the age of feeling, now comes the age of reason. Therefore you will get the desired job by compromising.

== Cast ==
- Sami Frey as Bruno
- Catherine Deneuve as Lori
- Enrico Maria Salerno as Millo
- Norma Bengell as Ivana
- Andrea Checchi as Lori's father
- Sergio Tofano as don Bonifazi
- Glauco Mauri as Luigi
- Valeria Moriconi as Judith
- Lia Angeleri as Lori's stepmother
- Carlo Palmucci as Giorgio

== Production ==
Produced by Pasquale Festa Campanile and Massimo Franciosa for Franca Film (Rome), in co-production with S.N.D.C. of Paris, the film was shot in the summer of 1964 for the exteriors in Tuscany and for the interiors in the Studies of the SAFA Palatino, to go out in theaters in the first screening on 27 November 1964. First Italian film for Catherine Deneuve and Samy Frey.
