= Hospitals: The White Mafia =

1973 film

- Film poster
- Directed by: Luigi Zampa
- Written by: Massimo De Rita; Arduino Maiuri
- Produced by: Raimondo Castelli
- Starring: Enrico Maria Salerno; Gabriele Ferzetti; Luciano Salce; Claudio Gora; Tina Lattanzi; Claudio Nicastro; Enzo Garinei; Senta Berger
- Cinematography: Giuseppe Ruzzolini
- Edited by: Franco Fraticelli
- Music by: Riz Ortolani
- Release date: May 1973
- Running time: 105 minutes
- Country: Italy
- Language: Italian

Hospitals: The White Mafia (Italian: Bisturi, la mafia bianca) is a 1973 Italian drama film directed by Luigi Zampa and starring Enrico Maria Salerno and Gabriele Ferzetti. It was entered into the 1973 Cannes Film Festival.

== Cast ==
- Gabriele Ferzetti
- Senta Berger
- Enrico Maria Salerno
- Claudio Gora
- Claudio Nicastro
- Tina Lattanzi
- Enzo Garinei
- Gino Pernice
- Antonella Steni
- Luciano Salce
- Sandro Dori
- Ernesto Colli
- Ezio Sancrotti
- Luciano Rossi
- Fausto Tommei
