= Rugantino (film) =

- Directed by: Pasquale Festa Campanile
- Written by: Pasquale Festa Campanile, Sergio Corbucci, Enrico Oldoini, Pietro Garinei, Sandro Giovannini, Massimo Franciosa
- Starring: Adriano Celentano, Claudia Mori, Elio Pandolfi, Alvaro Vitali, Paolo Stoppa
- Cinematography: Gastone Di Giovanni
- Edited by: Mario Morra
- Music by: Armando Trovajoli
- Release date: 1973
- Running time: 110 min
- Country: Italy
- Language: Italian

Rugantino is a 1973 Italian comedy film directed by Pasquale Festa Campanile.

It is based on the stage musical with the same name by Pietro Garinei and Sandro Giovannini.

== Plot summary ==
Rome, 1800. Rugantino is a fool in love that rages eternal, though he is very unlucky in love stories and fruitful occasions. In fact, he is denounced for trying to rob the elderly uncle of his inheritance, apparently believing that he's dying and Rugantino sentenced to public torture of a squire. Rugantino is in love with young married Rosetta, whom she appears to love because of his innocence and ineptitude. The young man is then accused of murdering a Roman nobleman and sentenced to death. His fate is sealed, and after spending a few days in jail, Rugantino is beheaded.

== Cast ==
- Adriano Celentano: Rugantino
- Claudia Mori: Rosetta
- Renzo Palmer: cardinal Severini
- Maria Grazia Spina: Donna Marta Capitelli
- Sergio Tofano: Marquis Michele Sacconi
- Toni Ucci: Don Niccolò Capitelli
- Paolo Stoppa: Mastro Titta
- Riccardo Garrone: prince, brother of Niccolò
- Sandro Merli: Oste
- Guglielmo Spoletini: Gnecco
- Pippo Franco: Frascatano
- Enzo Robutti: painter
- Renato Baldini: nobleman
- Elio Pandolfi: voce bianca
- Vincenzo Crocitti: burino
- Alvaro Vitali: beggar
