= La calandria (1972 film) =

- Directed by: Pasquale Festa Campanile
- Written by: Gianfranco Clerici; Pasquale Festa Campanile; Ottavio Jemma
- Starring: Lando Buzzanca; Barbara Bouchet; Agostina Belli; Salvo Randone
- Cinematography: Silvano Ippoliti
- Music by: Gianni Ferrio
- Release date: 1972
- Language: Italian

La calandria is a 1972 Italian comedy film directed by Pasquale Festa Campanile. It is based upon the Renaissance play La calandria by Bernardo Dovizi, itself based on Plautus' Menaechmi and Giovanni Boccaccio's Decameron.

== Plot ==
The luxurious Livio (Lando Buzzanca) bets with the lord of the city to seduce a young bride (Agostina Belli) in a month, at the cost of his genitals.

== Cast ==
- Lando Buzzanca as Lidio
- Barbara Bouchet as Lucrezia
- Agostina Belli as Fulvia
- Salvo Randone as Calandro
- Mario Scaccia as Ruffo
- Giusi Raspani Dandolo as madre di Calandro
- Cesare Gelli as Ferruccio Consagra
- Maria Grazia Spina as Clizia, la cameriera
- Roberto Antonelli (actor)|Roberto Antonelli]] as Tessenio
- Giuliana Calandra
- Clara Colosimo
- Toni Ucci
