= Il corpo della ragassa =

1979 film by Pasquale Festa Campanile

- Theatrical release poster by Renato Casaro
- Directed by: Pasquale Festa Campanile
- Screenplay by: Ottavio Jemma; Enrico Oldoini
- Story by: Alberto Lattuada; Enrico Oldoini
- Starring: Lilli Carati; Enrico Maria Salerno
- Cinematography: Giuseppe Ruzzolini
- Edited by: Alberto Gallitti
- Music by: Riz Ortolani
- Release date: 1979
- Language: Italian

Il corpo della ragassa is a 1979 commedia sexy all'italiana film directed by Pasquale Festa Campanile. It is based on the 1969 novel with the same name by Gianni Brera.

== Plot ==
Teresa Aguzzi, called Tirisìn, is the beautiful daughter of Pasquale, a sand digger on the banks of the Po, in the lower province of Pavia in the thirties. During a trip to the city, the girl is noticed by the wealthy professor Ulderico Quario and immediately hired as a waitress in his palace. Assisted by the faithful housekeeper Caterina, the doctor improvises a pigmalione in the training of the rough Tirisìn in the arts of refined femininity, in order to be able to exhibit her as a sexual toy to her friends.

At the beginning Tirisìn shows some perplexities in being involved in this libertine game, but the happiness of the father, who with the new salary has finally managed to build a latrine inside their poor home, and the good advice of an expert maîtresse, they convince her to participate and, on the contrary, to take on a leading role and try to make the most of the situation.

== Cast ==
- Lilli Carati as Teresa Aguzzi, aka "Tirisìn"
- Enrico Maria Salerno as Professor Ulderico Quario
- Marisa Belli as Cecchina
- Elsa Vazzoler as Caterina
- Nino Bignamini as Erminio Alvarini
- Clara Colosimo as Procurer
- Giuliana Calandra as Laura Marengo
- Gino Pernice as Giovanni
- Renzo Montagnani as Pasquale Aguzzi

== See also ==
- List of Italian films of 1979
