= A Sentimental Attempt =

- Directed by: Massimo Franciosa, Pasquale Festa Campanile
- Cinematography: Ennio Guarnieri
- Edited by: Ruggero Mastroianni
- Music by: Piero Piccioni
- Release date: 1963
- Country: Italy
- Language: Italian

A Sentimental Attempt (Italian: Un tentativo sentimentale) is a 1963 Italian comedy film. It stars actor Gabriele Ferzetti.

It was a Black & White feature film telecast in 1963.

== Cast ==
- Françoise Prévost: Carla
- Jean-Marc Bory: Dino
- Letícia Román: Luciana
- Giulio Bosetti: Renato
- Barbara Steele: Silvia
- Gabriele Ferzetti: Giulio
- Maria Pia Luzi: Irene
- Marino Masè: Piero
