= Porca vacca =

- Italian theatrical release poster
- Directed by: Pasquale Festa Campanile
- Written by: Massimo De Rita
- Story by: Marcello Coscia; Pasquale Festa Campanile
- Starring: Renato Pozzetto; Laura Antonelli; Aldo Maccione
- Cinematography: Alfio Contini
- Music by: Ennio Morricone; Riz Ortolani
- Release date: 1982
- Language: Italian

Porca vacca is a 1982 Italian war-comedy film written and directed by Pasquale Festa Campanile. The film was panned by critics.

== Plot ==
During World War I Barbisetti, a mediocre artist also known as "Primo Baffo", tries to avoid the military service, but he doesn't succeed. During the war he meets two farmers, Tomo Secondo and Marianna, two scammers: the two manage to deceive the soldier many times, but eventually the three establish a friendship made of ups and downs.

== Cast ==
- Renato Pozzetto: Primo Malvisetti aka Primo Baffo
- Laura Antonelli: Marianna
- Aldo Maccione: Tomo Secondo
- Raymond Bussières: Uncle Nicola
- Raymond Pellegrin: The General
- Adriana Russo: The Ballet Dancer
- Massimo Sarchielli: The Captain
- Gino Pernice: The "Professor"
- Corrado Olmi: Ufficiale Medico
- Enzo Robutti: Captain Caimani del Piave
- Maurizio Mattioli: Soldier from Bologna

== See also ==
- List of Italian films of 1982
