= Manolesta =

- Directed by: Pasquale Festa Campanile
- Screenplay by: Ottavio Jemma
- Story by: Ottavio Jemma; Enrico Oldoini
- Produced by: Aurelio De Laurentiis; Luigi De Laurentiis
- Starring: Tomas Milian; Giovanna Ralli
- Cinematography: Giancarlo Ferrando
- Edited by: Amedeo Salfa
- Music by: Detto Mariano
- Release date: 1981
- Language: Italian

Manolesta is a 1981 Italian comedy film directed by Pasquale Festa Campanile.

== Plot ==
Gino Quirino aka Manolesta, a thief and a con man, lives on a barge anchored on the Tiber with Bruno, his young son. Gino ends up in the crosshairs of the social worker Dr. Angela De Maria, and he is forced to find an honest job.

== Cast ==
- Tomas Milian as Gino Quirino
- Giovanna Ralli as Dr. Angela De Maria
- Paco Fabrini as Bruno
- Armando Pugliese as Rosario
- Adriana Russo as Angela
- Clara Colosimo as the social worker
- Massimo Pittarello as Mammola
- Tom Felleghy as the judge
- Nello Pazzafini as the ATAC driver
- Ennio Antonelli as the bricklayer
