= Little Funny Guy =

- Directed by: Pasquale Festa Campanile
- Written by: Massimo Franciosa; Castellano & Pipolo; Pasquale Festa Campanile
- Starring: Adriano Celentano; Claudia Mori; Lino Toffolo
- Cinematography: Gastone Di Giovanni
- Edited by: Mario Morra
- Music by: Carlo Rustichelli
- Release date: 1973
- Running time: 98 minutes
- Country: Italy
- Language: Italian

L'emigrante, internationally released as Little Funny Guy, is a 1973 Italian comedy film directed by Pasquale Festa Campanile.

== Plot ==
At the end of 1900s Saturnino Cavallo leaves his family to emigrate to America, in search of fortune, but his traces were lost. In Naples during the 1920s, his son Peppino Cavallo (Adriano Celentano), grown up, wakes up every night thinking of his father, with such insistence that he eventually decides to go look for him in America.

== Cast ==
- Adriano Celentano as Peppino Cavallo
- Claudia Mori as Rosita Flores
- Sybil Danning as Pamela
- Lino Toffolo as Toni
- José Calvo as Don Nicolone
- Manuel Zarzo as Ralph Morisco
- Tommaso Bianco as Michele Cavallo
- Isa Danieli as Wife of Michele
- Giacomo Rizzo as Cashier
- Herbert Fux
- Gigi Reder
- Nino Vingelli
