= Ladro lui, ladra lei =

1958 film

- Film poster
- Directed by: Luigi Zampa
- Written by: Pasquale Festa Campanile; Massimo Franciosa; Alberto Sordi; Luigi Zampa
- Starring: Alberto Sordi
- Cinematography: Leonida Barboni
- Edited by: Eraldo Da Roma
- Release date: 1958
- Running time: 100 minutes
- Country: Italy
- Language: Italian

Ladro lui, ladra lei is a 1958 Italian comedy film directed by Luigi Zampa. Starring Alberto Sordi and Sylva Koscina, it tells the story of a young woman in Rome who is first sucked into a life of crime by a released convict and then has an awakening of conscience.

== Plot ==
From a poor district beside the railway tracks, Cesira tries to earn a living as an ill-paid salesgirl but will not accept the male advances that go with the job. Back into her life breezes Cencio, a career criminal who is just out of jail and looking for new opportunities. He tries blackmailing all of Cesira's former employers who have forced their attentions on her, and from one of them steals an expensive watch. This he gives to Cesira as a present but she, needing money not useless ostentation, sells it to a jeweller who is also a notorious fence. Cencio dresses as a policeman, arrests the jeweller, empties his safe, and takes him to jail. The man gets 10 years for his crimes.

Cesira's last employer, Raimondi, repents of the way he treated Cesira and sets her up to sell some of his stock in a little shop of her own. But his business is not doing well and his accountant advises him to get what money he can out of the country before it is seized by taxman and creditors. The owner of a dress shop knows of a Vatican official who can arrange such things and Cencio dresses as the man, with Cesira as his lookout. When Raimondi arrives, he is shocked to see the two about to swindle him and leaves in disgust.

Cesira realises how stupid she has been to go along with Cencio's rackets, and is ashamed of how Raimondi has been treated. The police meanwhile, who have been looking for the fake policeman who dumped the fence at the jail, trace him and recoup his loot. He goes back to jail, asserting that Cesira was not a knowing accomplice, while Raimondi asks Cesira if she will help rebuild his business as his wife.

== Cast ==
- Alberto Sordi - Cencio
- Sylva Koscina - Cesira
- Alberto Bonucci - Dr. Valletti
- Mario Carotenuto - Commendator Cestelli
- Mario Riva - Commendator Maghetti
- Marisa Merlini - Marialele
- Ettore Manni - Raimondi
- Anita Durante - Cencio's Mother
- Carlo Delle Piane - "Gnaccheretta", Prisoner
- Nando Bruno - Policeman
- Mino Doro - Jeweller
- Vinicio Sofia - Brigadier
- Guglielmo Inglese - Lauricella
- Ada Colangeli - Cestelli's Wife
