= Qua la mano =

- Italian theatrical release poster by Renato Casaro
- Directed by: Pasquale Festa Campanile
- Cinematography: Giancarlo Ferrando
- Music by: Detto Mariano
- Release date: 1980
- Language: Italian

Qua la mano (also known as Give me five) is a 1980 Italian comedy film directed by Pasquale Festa Campanile.

The film was a great commercial success, grossing over 11 billion lire; it was the first film to break through the wall of the ten billion at the Italian box office.

== Cast ==
- Adriano Celentano: Don Fulgenzio
- Enrico Montesano: Orazio Imperiali
- Lilli Carati: Rossana
- Philippe Leroy: the Pope
- Renzo Montagnani: Libero Battaglini
- Carlo Bagno: the Cardinal
- Mario Carotenuto: the sailor
- Enzo Robutti: Benigno
- Adriana Russo: Ersilia
