= The Libertine (1968 film) =

Film by Pasquale Festa Campanile

- Theatrical release poster
- Italian: La matriarca
- Directed by: Pasquale Festa Campanile
- Screenplay by: Ottavio Jemma; Nicolò Ferrari
- Story by: Nicolò Ferrari
- Produced by: Silvio Clementelli
- Starring: Catherine Spaak; Jean-Louis Trintignant; Luigi Proietti; Luigi Pistilli; Renzo Montagnani; Fabienne Dali; Nora Ricci; Edda Ferronao; Vittorio Caprioli; Gabriele Tinti; Venantino Venantini; Frank Wolff; Paolo Stoppa; Philippe Leroy
- Cinematography: Alfio Contini
- Edited by: Sergio Montanari
- Music by: Armando Trovajoli
- Production companies: Clesi Cinematografica; Finanziaria San Marco
- Distributed by: Euro International Films
- Release date: 28 December 1968
- Running time: 90 minutes
- Country: Italy
- Language: Italian
- Box office: 128,378 admissions (France); 359,883 admissions (Spain)

The Libertine (Italian: La matriarca, lit. 'The Matriarch') is a 1968 Italian sex comedy film directed by Pasquale Festa Campanile and starring Catherine Spaak and Jean-Louis Trintignant. The film follows a young widow who discovers that her recently deceased husband had a secret apartment where he engaged in kinky sexual practices with other women. In light of this discovery, she decides to use the same apartment to explore her own sexuality with other men.

== Plot ==
When her husband Franco suddenly dies, the young and beautiful Margherita "Mimi" Delleani is informed by Franco's business partner, Sandro Maldini, of an apartment registered in her late husband's name. Mimi discovers it to be a luxurious apartment, where she finds home videos of Franco engaging in BDSM with other women, including her best friend Claudia. Shocked and dismayed by this discovery, she realizes that her disappointment does not stem from jealousy, but from the fact that she was not involved in Franco's fantasies; she presumes that he deemed her too "respectable" and "sacred" for his fantasies.

Mimi buys a copy of Richard von Krafft-Ebing's book Psychopathia Sexualis and embarks on a quest to understand sexual perversions. She lives out Franco's fantasies with various men, both acquaintances (including Sandro) and strangers (including a man who mistakes her for a prostitute), each time learning more about the depths of human depravation, as well as the extent of the sexual double standard for women. In Franco's apartment, Mimi has sex with a stranger she met at a party who behaves aggressively by ripping her dress. She also has an affair with Claudia's husband, Fabrizio, and unsuccessfully tries to engage in sexual roleplay with him and a female friend of his.

Mimi's mother, concerned that she has not heard from her daughter in a while, convinces her to schedule an appointment with the family doctor for a checkup. During the appointment, Mimi meets a radiologist, Dr. Carlo De Marchi, who carries her on his back when she accidentally sprains her ankle. She later reads about the sexual practice of riding on someone else's back, with the tale of Phyllis and Aristotle cited as an example. When Mimi attends one of Carlo's university classes, he fails to recognize her and later invites her to accompany him to an archaeological site near the sea. Checking into a hotel room together, he finally recognizes her, and after she admits she is not enrolled at the university, they have sex.

On the drive back to Rome, Carlo asks Mimi when they are getting married, but she responds that he does not know her at all. She suddenly strips to her panties, discarding her clothes on the highway. Stopping at a gas station, Carlo goes into the convenience store to get a coffee while dozens of men gather around the car to ogle Mimi, her eyes filling with tears. When Carlo drops Mimi off at her place that night, he again asks her when they are getting married, and she tells him to meet her the following day.

The next day in Franco's apartment, Mimi plays one of Franco's home movies to Carlo. Although Carlo accepts Mimi for who she is, she refuses to marry him, prompting him to destroy Franco's apartment and spank her buttocks until she finally agrees to marry him. After the wedding ceremony, Carlo happily agrees to let Mimi ride on his back like a horse.

== Cast ==
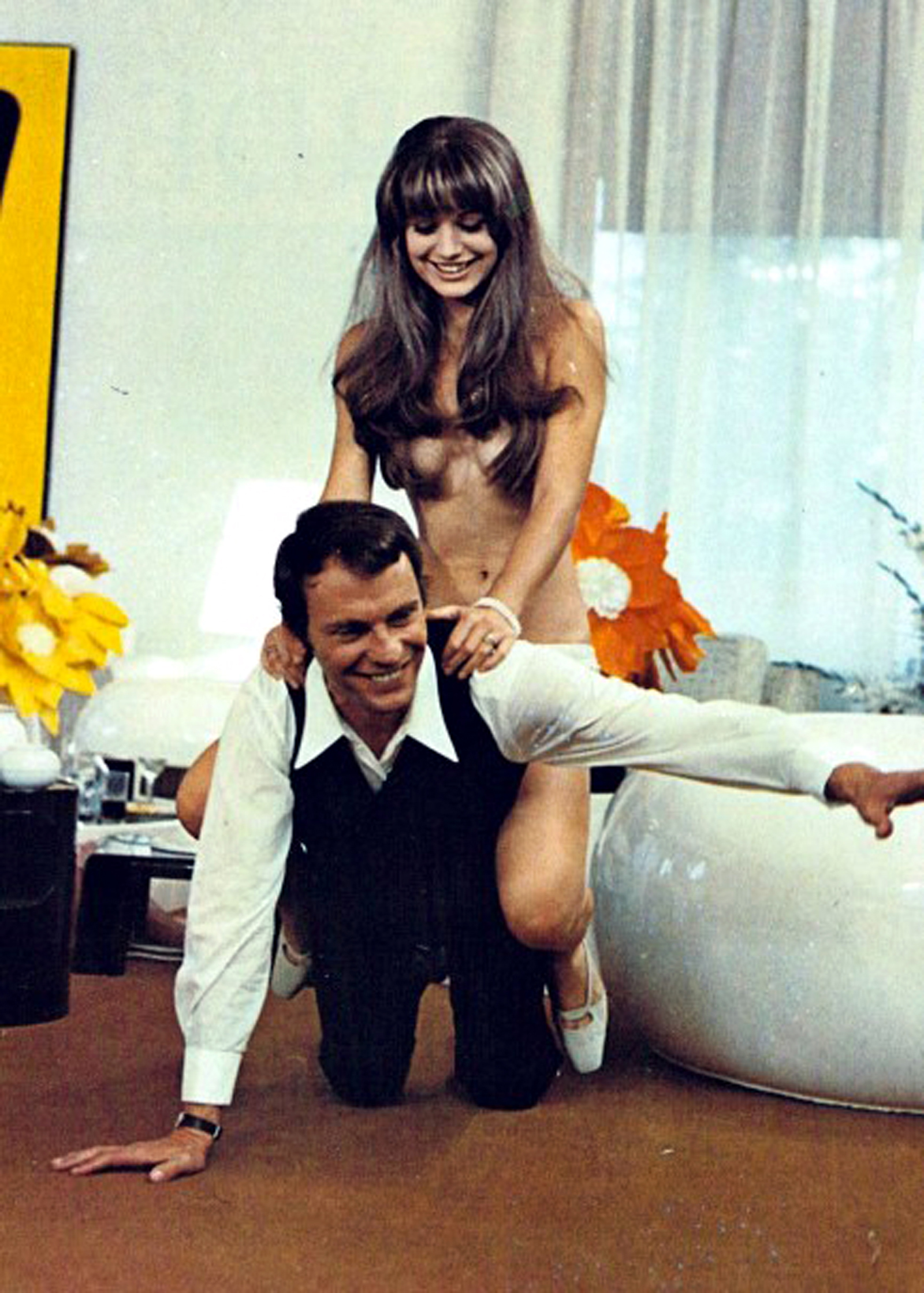
Mimi (Catherine Spaak) riding on Carlo's (Jean-Louis Trintignant) back in The Libertine

- Catherine Spaak as Margherita Delleani, a.k.a. Mimi
- Jean-Louis Trintignant as Dr. Carlo De Marchi
- Luigi Proietti as Sandro Maldini
- Luigi Pistilli as Otto Frank, a.k.a. Mr. X
- Renzo Montagnani as Fabrizio
- Fabienne Dali as Claudia
- Nora Ricci as Mimi's mother
- Edda Ferronao as Maria
- Vittorio Caprioli as the librarian
- Gabriele Tinti as the man in the car
- Venantino Venantini as Aurelio
- Frank Wolff as Dr. Giulio
- Paolo Stoppa as Professor Zauri
- Philippe Leroy as the tennis instructor

== Reception ==
Howard Thompson of The New York Times said the film was "not nearly as clever, sophisticated and amusing as it archly pretends." Derek Malcolm of The Guardian called it "pseudo-sophisticated, so fake as to be positively sick making and, what is more, thoroughly unerotic." Gary Arnold of The Washington Post complained "the film's own attitudes are far too conventional". Kevin Thomas of the Los Angeles Times thought the film was "at times... pretty hot stuff... has a little more style and wit than most Radley Metzger releases." Terry Clifford of the Chicago Tribune thought the film was "more clumsy than clever... just as unimaginative as the film it attempts to parody."

== See also ==
- Sadism and masochism in fiction
- Libertine
