= Wifemistress =

- Theatrical poster
- Directed by: Marco Vicario
- Written by: Rodolfo Sonego; Marco Vicario
- Produced by: Franco Cristaldi; Alberto Pugliese
- Starring: Laura Antonelli; Marcello Mastroianni
- Cinematography: Ennio Guarnieri
- Edited by: Nino Baragli
- Distributed by: Quartet Films
- Release dates: 1 March 1978 (France); 7 January 1979 (USA)
- Running time: 106 minutes
- Country: Italy
- Language: Italian

Wifemistress (Italian: Mogliamante) is a 1977 Italian romantic movie directed by Marco Vicario.

== Plot ==
Ever since her husband pronounced her frigid on the night of their wedding, Antonia DeAngelis (Laura Antonelli) has been bedridden. When her husband disappears, she sets off in his horse and buggy on his route to find out what happened to him. She learns about her husband's business, his passions, his political writing, his mistresses, and his indifference to the peasants on her family's land.

Her growing knowledge about her husband's life causes her own passions to stir, and she takes over her husband's business, his habits, his thoughts, and even his mistress. She begins an affair with a young foreign doctor, improves the conditions of the peasants, and publishes her husband's writings.

In reality, a murder charge has forced Luigi into hiding directly across the street from his own home, where he watches Antonia become his sexual and social equal from behind the slats of a boarded window. Once Antonia became aware of the fact that Luigi was watching her from his hiding place, she opened her windows wide and continued her erotic escapades. This tortured Luigi as he did not know his wife was capable of such passion and eroticism.

After the police drop the murder charge, he must decide whether and how to deal with his wife's transformation.

== Cast ==
- Laura Antonelli as Antonia De Angelis
- Marcello Mastroianni as Luigi De Angelis
- Leonard Mann as Dr. Dario Favella
- William Berger as Count Brandini
- Gastone Moschin as Vincenzo
- Olga Karlatos as Dr. Paola Pagano
- Stefano Patrizi as Enrico, Clara's fiancé
- Luigi Diberti as Lawyer
- Enzo Robutti as Priest
- Daniele Gabbai as Young official
