= Ennio Guarnieri =

Italian cinematographer (1930–2019)

- Born: 12 October 1930; Rome, Italy
- Died: 1 July 2019 (aged 88); Licata, Italy
- Occupation: Cinematographer

Ennio Guarnieri (12 October 1930 – 1 July 2019) was an Italian cinematographer.

He was a frequent contributor to the films of Mauro Bolognini and Franco Zeffirelli, and worked on many occasions with Vittorio De Sica, Marco Ferreri and Lina Wertmüller.

== Early life ==
Born in Rome, Guarnieri abandoned his studies and worked as an assistant cinematographer to Anchise Brizzi from 1949 to 1956. He debuted as director of photography in 1962 with I giorni contati by Elio Petri. In the late sixties, for his ability to portray actresses, Guarnieri became a trusted cinematographer for stars such as Virna Lisi, Sylva Koscina and Tina Aumont, for which he made extensive use of soft focus, backlight and scrims. His work in Mauro Bolognini's L'assoluto naturale (1969), starring Sylva Koscina, has been referred to as "one of the cornerstones of Italian photography in the sixties".

For his work in Vittorio De Sica's The Garden of the Finzi-Continis (1970), he was nominated for a BAFTA Award for Best Cinematography.

Guarnieri's first collaboration with Franco Zeffirelli, Brother Sun, Sister Moon (1972), earned him his first Silver Ribbon for best cinematography; he was awarded with a second Silver Ribbon ten years later again with a film directed by Zeffirelli, La traviata.

From the 1980s onward, Guarnieri focused on television and advertising.

== Partial filmography ==
- The Mishap (1960)
- His Days Are Numbered (1962)
- The Sea (1962)
- The Conjugal Bed (1963)
- A Sentimental Attempt (1963)
- High Infidelity (1964)
- White Voices (1964)
- La costanza della ragione (1964)
- Countersex (1964)
- Le bambole (1965)
- Questa volta parliamo di uomini (1965)
- Seven Golden Men (1965)
- Made in Italy (1965)
- Seven Golden Men Strike Again (1966)
- The Girl and the General (1967)
- Arabella (1967)
- Anyone Can Play (1967)
- Better a Widow (1968)
- Be Sick... It's Free (1968)
- Medea (1969)
- Blow Hot, Blow Cold (1969)
- L'assoluto naturale (1969)
- Metello (1970)
- Invasion (1970)
- The Garden of the Finzi-Continis (1970)
- Bubù (1971)
- Marta (1971)
- Brother Sun, Sister Moon (1972)
- Lo chiameremo Andrea (1972)
- L'uccello migratore (1972)
- Hitler: The Last Ten Days (1973)
- Ash Wednesday (1973)
- A Brief Vacation (1973)
- The Voyage (1974)
- Drama of the Rich (1974)
- Swept Away (1974)
- Down the Ancient Staircase (1975)
- The Flower in His Mouth (1975)
- The Sensuous Nurse (1975)
- The Inheritance (1976)
- The Cassandra Crossing (1976)
- Al piacere di rivederla (1976)
- Wifemistress (1977)
- The Cat (1977)
- Il... Belpaese (1977)
- La presidentessa (1977)
- Traffic Jam (1979)
- A Dangerous Toy (1979)
- The Visitor (1979)
- A Man on His Knees (1979)
- Dr. Jekyll Likes Them Hot (1979)
- I viaggiatori della sera (1979)
- Fun Is Beautiful (1980)
- The Lady of the Camellias (1981)
- The Wings of the Dove (1981)
- Il turno (1981)
- Talcum Powder (1982)
- La casa stregata (1982)
- La Traviata (1983)
- The Story of Piera (1983)
- Ginger and Fred (1986)
- Otello (1986)
- Farewell Moscow (1987)
- Dancers (1987)
- Francesco (1989)
- The Flesh (1991)
- The Inner Circle (1991)
- L'Atlantide (1992)
- Entangled (1993)
- Sparrow (1993)
- The Nymph (1996)
- Callas Forever (2002)
- The Seed of Discord (2008)
