= A Proper Scandal =

- Directed by: Pasquale Festa Campanile
- Written by: Suso Cecchi D'Amico; Pasquale Festa Campanile
- Produced by: Fulvio Lucisano
- Starring: Ben Gazzara; Giuliana De Sio
- Cinematography: Alfio Contini
- Edited by: Antonio Siciliano
- Music by: Riz Ortolani
- Release date: 1984
- Country: Italy
- Language: Italian

A Proper Scandal (Italian: Uno scandalo perbene, lit. 'A respectable scandal') is a 1984 Italian drama film. It represents the last film written and directed by Pasquale Festa Campanile. It is a true dramatization of the Bruneri-Canella case.

The film entered the competition at the 41st edition of the Venice International Film Festival.

== Cast ==
- Ben Gazzara as Bruneri / Canella
- Giuliana De Sio as Giulia Canella
- Vittorio Caprioli as Renzo
- Franco Fabrizi as Count Guarienti
- Valeria D'Obici as Camilla Ghidini
- Giuliana Calandra as Maria Gastaldelli
- Vincenzo Crocitti as The Journalist
- Enzo Robutti as The Professor
- Carlos de Carvalho as Count De Besi
- Clara Colosimo as Tenutaria
