= Tell Me You Do Everything for Me =

- Directed by: Pasquale Festa Campanile
- Written by: Piero Chiara (novel); Giuseppe Moccia; Franco Castellano; Suso Cecchi D'Amico
- Produced by: Leonardo Pescarolo
- Starring: Johnny Dorelli; Pamela Villoresi; Jacques Dufilho
- Cinematography: Franco Di Giacomo
- Edited by: Antonio Siciliano
- Music by: Armando Trovajoli
- Production company: Euro International Film
- Distributed by: Euro International Film
- Release date: 6 August 1976
- Running time: 100 minutes
- Country: Italy
- Language: Italian

Tell Me You Do Everything for Me (Italian: Dimmi che fai tutto per me) is a 1976 Italian comedy film directed by Pasquale Festa Campanile and starring Johnny Dorelli, Pamela Villoresi and Jacques Dufilho.

== Cast ==
- Johnny Dorelli as Francesco Salmarani
- Pamela Villoresi as Mary Mancini
- Jacques Dufilho as 'Dodo' Spinacroce
- Maria Grazia Spina as Paola Signorini - Francesco's lover
- Nanni Svampa as Bonomelli aka il Biondino
- Enzo Robutti as Felegatti
- Ferdinando Murolo as Roberto Mancuso aka Robbie
- Stefano Amato as Mino Salmarani
- Francesco D'Adda as Caputo - The Police Commissioner's Assistant
- Andréa Ferréol as Miriam Spinacroce
- Pino Caruso as The Police Commissioner

== Bibliography ==
- Roberto Chiti, Roberto Poppi, Mario Pecorari. Dizionario del cinema italiano: Volume 4, A-L. Gremese Editore, 1991 .
