= The Girl and the General =

- American theatrical release poster
- Directed by: Pasquale Festa Campanile
- Written by: Luigi Malerba
- Produced by: Carlo Ponti; Luciano Perugia
- Starring: Rod Steiger; Virna Lisi; Umberto Orsini
- Cinematography: Ennio Guarnieri
- Music by: Ennio Morricone
- Distributed by: Metro-Goldwyn-Mayer
- Release date: 1967
- Running time: 103 minutes
- Country: Italy
- Language: Italian

The Girl and the General (Italian: La Ragazza e il Generale) is a 1967 Italian anti-war comedy film starring Rod Steiger and Virna Lisi and produced by Carlo Ponti.

== Plot ==
A young woman (Virna Lisi) and a soldier team up to deliver an Austrian General (Rod Steiger) to Italian forces during World War I. Their quest for the 1000 Lire reward changes their lives unexpectedly.

== Cast ==
- Rod Steiger as The General
- Virna Lisi as Ada
- Umberto Orsini as Pvt. Tarasconi
- Tony Gaggia as The Lieutenant
- Marco Mariani as The Corporal
- Jacques Herlin as The Veterinary
- Valentino Macchi as Soldier
