= Pino Caruso =

Italian actor, author, and television personality (1934–2019)

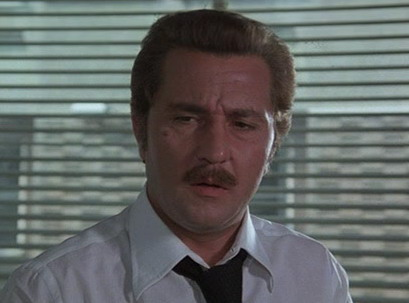
- Caruso in The Sunday Woman (1975)
- Born: Giuseppe Caruso; 12 October 1934; Palermo, Italy
- Died: 7 March 2019 (aged 84); Rome, Italy
- Occupation: Actor

Giuseppe Caruso (12 October 1934 – 7 March 2019), best known as Pino Caruso, was an Italian actor, author and television personality.

== Life and career ==
Caruso was born in Palermo, Sicily and debuted as a dramatic stage actor in his home town in 1957. In 1965, he moved to Rome and entered the theatre company "Il Bagaglino". He gained great popularity taking part in several RAI variety shows such as Che domenica amici (1968), Gli amici della domenica (1970), Teatro 10 (1971), Dove sta Zazà (1973), Mazzabubù (1975), and Due come noi (1979).

Caruso was the president of the Italian Actors Union from 1979 to 1989.

From 1995 to 1997, upon appointment by Palermo Mayor Leoluca Orlando, Caruso planned and directed Palermo in scena, a two-month artistic and theatrical Festival (held from 14 July to 14 September). In 2001, the Extraordinary Commissioner of the city Ettore Serio called Caruso to repeat the experience.

Since 1976, Caruso also collaborated regularly with newspapers and magazines, being columnist among others for daily newspapers Il Mattino, Il Messaggero, Paese Sera, L'Avanti, Il Tempo, La Sicilia. He was also author of numerous books, ranging from various genres.

He took part in approximately 30 films, debuting as a director in 1977 with the film Ride bene chi ride ultimo.

He was married to stage actress Marilisa Ferzetti and was the father of the voice actor Francesco Caruso. He was a life-long vegetarian.

Caruso died on 7 March 2019, at the age of 84.[6]

== Selected filmography ==
- The Most Beautiful Couple in the World (1968) - Carmelo Miccichè
- La main (1969) - Marco - le cycliste
- Gli infermieri della mutua (1969) - Dr. Borselli
- Atlantic Wall (1970) - Friedrich
- Quella piccola differenza (1970) - Marino Marini
- Gli amici degli amici hanno saputo (1973) - Vincenzino Cipolla
- Malicious (1973) - Don Cirillo
- Seduction (1973) - Alfredo
- La governante (1974) - Enrico Platania
- The Common Man (1975) - Vigorelli
- L'ammazzatina (1975) - Mimì Galluzzo
- Lips of Lurid Blue (1975) - Don Gino
- The Sunday Woman (1975) - Police Commissioner De Palma
- Tell Me You Do Everything for Me (1976) - The Police Commissioner
- Il marito in collegio (1977) - Barone Filippo Pancaldi
- Il... Belpaese (1977) - Ovidio Camorrà
- Ride bene chi ride ultimo (1977) - Giuseppe Tarluto (segment "Sedotto e violentato")
- Gegè Bellavita (1978) - The Duke Attanasi
- Il ficcanaso (1980) - Commissioner
- L'esercito più pazzo del mondo (1981) - Capitano Parabellum
- Canto d'amore (1982)
- Street Kids (1989) - The judge
- La strategia della maschera (1998) - Don Ciccio Bova
- La matassa (2009) - Don Gino
- Abbraccialo per me (2016) - Don Pino

== Bibliography ==
- L'uomo comune, 1985, Novecento
- I delitti di via della Loggia, 1991, Novecento
- Il diluvio universale. Acqua passata, 1995, Novecento
- L'uomo comune (edizione rinnovata), 2005, Marsilio
- Il silenzio dell'ultima notte, 2009, Flaccovio editore
- Appartengo a una generazione che deve ancora nascere (aforismi storie, personaggi e ragionamenti sullo stato attuale del mondo), 2014, ERI-RAI (Mondadori)
- Il senso dell'umorismo è l'espressione più alta della serietà (aforismi storie, personaggi e ragionamenti sullo stato attuale del mondo), 2017, Alpes editore
- Se si scopre che sono onesto, nessuno si fiderà più di me (aforismi storie, personaggi e ragionamenti sullo stato attuale del mondo), 2017, Alpes editore
