= Smog (film) =

1962 comedy-drama film

- Directed by: Franco Rossi
- Screenplay by: Pasquale Festa Campanile; Massimo Franciosa; Ugo Guerra; Franco Rossi
- Produced by: Goffredo Lombardo
- Starring: Enrico Maria Salerno; Annie Girardot; Renato Salvatori
- Cinematography: Ted D. McCord
- Edited by: Mario Serandrei
- Music by: Piero Umiliani
- Distributed by: Titanus
- Release date: 1962
- Language: Italian

Smog is a 1962 Italian comedy-drama film co-written and directed by Franco Rossi. It premiered in competition at the 23rd edition of the Venice Film Festival. The film is regarded as the first Italian production entirely shot in the United States.

== Cast ==
- Enrico Maria Salerno as Vittorio Ciocchetti
- Annie Girardot as Gabriella
- Renato Salvatori as Mario Scarpelli
- Susan Spafford as Kathleen Flanagan
- Len Lesser as Lelio Marpicati
- Isabella Albonico as Isabella
- Max Showalter as Paul Prescott
- Graziella Granata as the woman with the sick baby
- Bernard Judge as the architect
- Loredana Nusciak
- John Phillip Law
