= Anna Salvatore =

Italian painter (1923–1978)

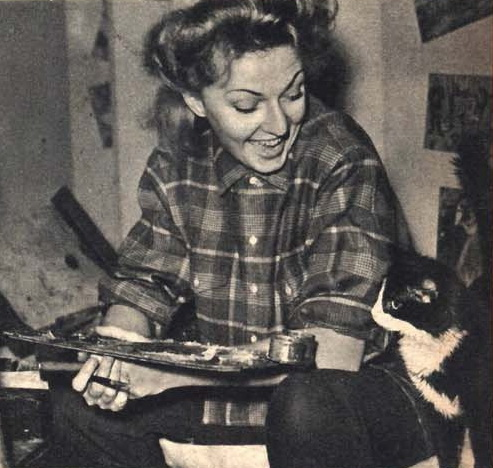
- Salvatore in 1952
- Born: 1923; Rome, Italy
- Died: 18 May 1978 (aged 54–55); Rome, Italy
- Occupation: Painter
- Spouse: Pasquale Festa Campanile (sep. 1962)

Anna Salvatore (1923 – 18 May 1978) was an Italian painter, sculptor, writer and socialite.

== Life and career ==
Born in Rome in 1923, Salvatore studied at the Accademia di Belle Arti di Firenze under Ottone Rosai, Galileo Chini and Felice Carena, and later at the Accademia di Belle Arti di Roma. She held her first exhibition in 1940. A member of the neorealist movement, she became first known thanks to her portraits of suburban people.

Salvatore took part in the XXIV e XXVIII Venice Biennale and in the V, VI and VIII Rome Quadriennale exhibitions. An "exponent of a deeply popular and socially engaged form of painting" and a major figure in the cultural and social life of her hometown, she owned the Il Pincio Gallery in Piazza del Popolo.

In 1959, Salvatore played herself in Federico Fellini's La dolce vita. In 1966, she made her literary debut with the novel Subliminal tu. She also served as professor of history of costumes at the Centro Sperimentale di Cinematografia. Married and separated from writer and film director Pasquale Festa Campanile, she died of a brain aneurysm on 18 May 1978 at the Policlinico Umberto I in her hometown. She has been described as "a larger than life persona" who "made her one of the most talked-about cultural figures of her day".
