= Everyone's in Love =

1959 film

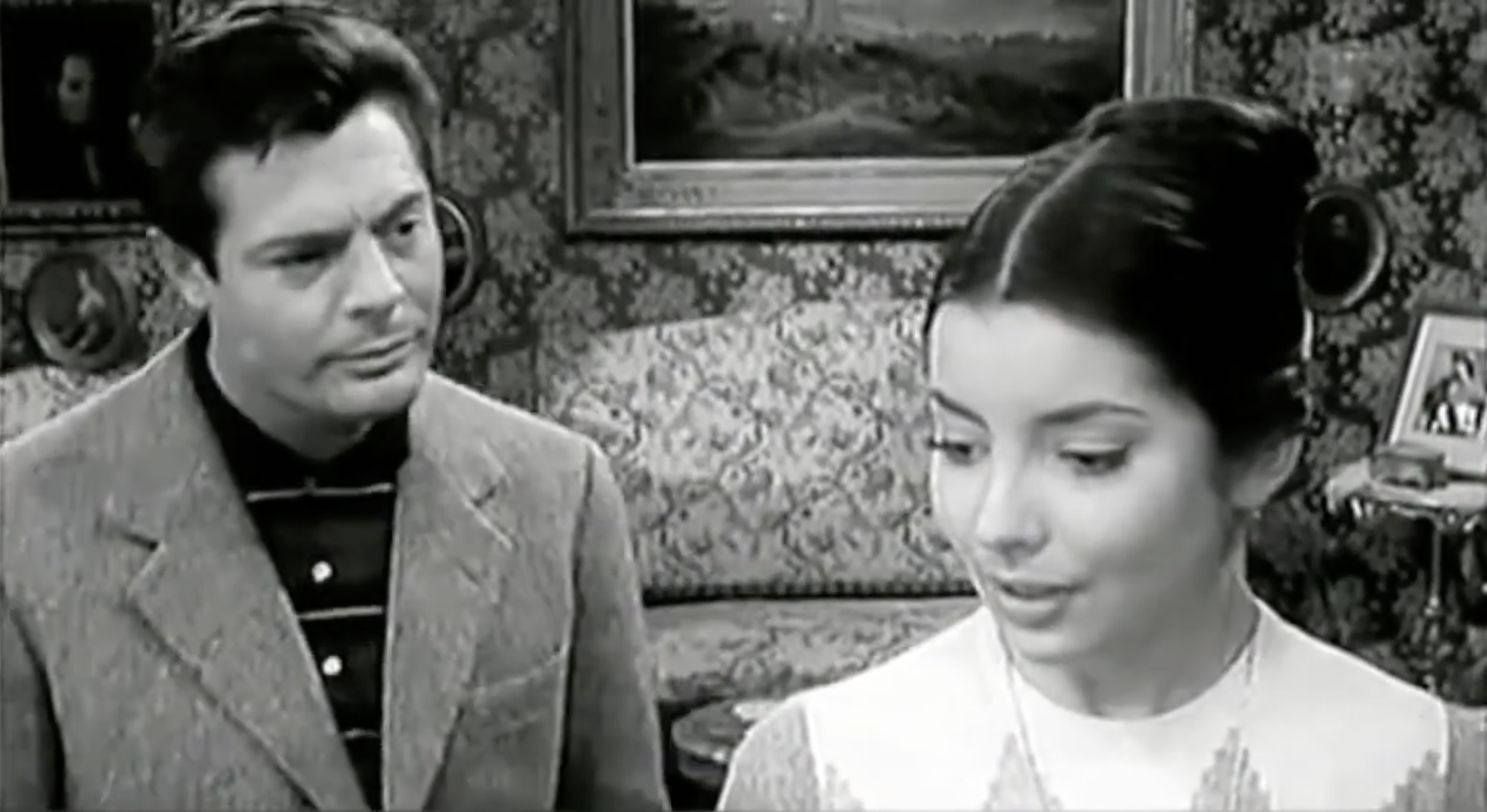
- Mastroianni and Sassard in a film scene
- Directed by: Giuseppe Orlandini
- Written by: Pasquale Festa Campanile; Massimo Franciosa; Ugo Guerra; Giorgio Prosperi; Franco Rossi
- Produced by: Guido Giambartolomei
- Starring: Marcello Mastroianni; Jacqueline Sassard
- Cinematography: Armando Nannuzzi
- Edited by: Otello Colangeli
- Music by: Alessandro Cicognini
- Production companies: Royal Film; France Cinéma
- Distributed by: Cineriz
- Release date: 4 October 1959
- Running time: 87 minutes
- Country: Italy
- Language: Italian

Everyone's in Love (Italian: Tutti innamorati) is a 1959 Italian comedy film directed by Giuseppe Orlandini.

== Cast ==
- Marcello Mastroianni - Giovanni Mazzanti
- Jacqueline Sassard - Allegra Barberio
- Gabriele Ferzetti - Arturo
- Marisa Merlini - Jolanda Bonocore
- Nando Bruno - Cesare Bonocore
- Franco Di Trocchio - Libero Mazzanti
- Memmo Carotenuto - Ferruccio
- Clara Bindi - Rosa dell'Amore
- Ruggero Marchi - Ermanno Barberio
- Leopoldo Trieste - Cipriani
