= The Voyage (1974 film) =

1974 film by Vittorio De Sica

- Italian theatrical release poster
- Italian: Il viaggio
- Directed by: Vittorio De Sica
- Screenplay by: Diego Fabbri; Massimo Franciosa; Luisa Montagnana; Luigi Pirandello
- Based on: Il viaggio by Luigi Pirandello
- Produced by: Carlo Ponti
- Starring: Sophia Loren; Richard Burton; Ian Bannen; Barbara Pilavin; Sergio Bruni; Renato Pinciroli; Annabella Incontrera
- Cinematography: Ennio Guarnieri
- Edited by: Franco Arcalli
- Music by: Manuel De Sica
- Production companies: Compagnia Cinematografica Champion; C.A.P.A.C.
- Distributed by: Interfilm (Italy); Les Productions Artistes Associés (France)
- Release dates: 11 March 1974 (Italy); 13 November 1974 (France)
- Running time: 102 minutes
- Countries: Italy; France
- Language: Italian

The Voyage (Italian: Il viaggio; also released as The Journey) is a 1974 romantic drama film directed by Vittorio De Sica, based on the short story Il viaggio by Luigi Pirandello. It was De Sica's final film.

== Plot ==
Set in Sicily in the years leading up to World War I, Adriana De Mauro loves Cesar Braggi, but Cesar, honoring his father's dying wish, allows his brother Antonio to marry her. As fate wills, Antonio dies in an automobile accident. Adriana's mourning for Antonio ends when Cesar steps in to rekindle her lust of life. Soon, Adriana begins having dizzy spells. Cesar brings her to a specialist, and she is diagnosed with having an incurable disease. For the rest of their time together, Cesar woos Adriana and eventually proposes to her on a gondola. Yet Signora De Mauro, Adriana's mother, is not pleased with the relationship and argues bitterly with Cesar and stands in the way.

== Cast ==
- Sophia Loren as Adriana de Mauro
- Richard Burton as Cesare Braggi
- Ian Bannen as Antonio Braggi
- Barbara Pilavin as Adriana's Mother
- Renato Pinciroli as Dr. Mascione
- Daniele Vargas as Don Liborio, Lawyer
- Sergio Bruni as Armando Gill
- Ettore Geri as Rinaldo
- Olga Romanelli as Clementina
- Isabelle Marchall as Florist
- Riccardo Mangano as Dr. Carlini
- Annabella Incontrera as Simona
