= Gegè Bellavita =

- Directed by: Pasquale Festa Campanile
- Cinematography: Silvano Ippoliti
- Edited by: Alberto Gallitti
- Music by: Riz Ortolani
- Release date: 1978
- Country: Italy
- Language: Italian

Gegè Bellavita is a 1978 Italian commedia all'italiana film directed by Pasquale Festa Campanile.

== Cast ==
- Flavio Bucci as Gennarino Amato
- Lina Polito as Agatina
- Enzo Cannavale as Gennarino's Friend
- Marisa Laurito as Carmen
- Pino Caruso as Duke Attanasi
- Maria Pia Conte as Mercedes
- Miranda Martino as Rosa
- Marina Hedman as Chantal, Attanasi's wife
- Maria Baxa as Signora Sciscioni
