= Faddija – La legge della vendetta =

Faddija - La legge della vendetta
- Directed by: Roberto Bianchi Montero
- Written by: Roberto Bianchi Montero, Giovanni D'Eramo, Pasquale Festa Campanile, Fulvio Palmieri, Adolfo Franci
- Produced by: Annibale Valentini
- Music by: Alberto De Castello
- Distributed by: Variety Distribution
- Release date: 11 January 1950 (Italy)
- Running time: 85
- Country: Italy
- Language: Italy

Faddija – La legge della vendetta is a 1950 Italian crime melodrama film directed by Roberto Bianchi Montero.

== Cast ==
- Otello Toso
- Luisa Rossi
- William Tubbs
- Piero Palermini
- Olga Solbelli
- Silvio Bagolini
- Dario Dolci
- Luisa Rossi
- Edula Lollobrigida
- Bianca Manenti
