= Petomaniac =

- Directed by: Pasquale Festa Campanile
- Written by: Leo Benvenuti; Piero De Bernardi; Enrico Medioli
- Cinematography: Alfio Contini
- Edited by: Franco Fraticelli
- Music by: Carlo Rustichelli; Paolo Rustichelli
- Release date: 1983
- Language: Italian

Il petomane, internationally released as Petomaniac, is a 1983 Italian commedia all'italiana film directed by Pasquale Festa Campanile. It is loosely based on real life events of Joseph Pujol, best known as "Le Pétomane".

== Cast ==
- Ugo Tognazzi: Joseph Pujol
- Mariangela Melato: Catherine Dumurier
- Ricky Tognazzi: Michel Pujol
- Gianmarco Tognazzi: Lucien Pujol
- Stefano Roffi: Marc Pujol
- Giovanni Grimaldi: Louis Pujol
- Giuliana Calandra: Giulia Pujol
- Vittorio Caprioli: Pitalugue
- Anna Maria Gherardi: Misia Edwards
- Peter Berling: Ziedler
- Sergio Solli: Montesquieu
- Felice Andreasi: Lawyer Mercier
- Enzo Robutti : Giudice Istruttore
- Pietro Tordi: Prince d'Orleans
