= Invasion (1970 film) =

1970 drama film

- Directed by: Yves Allégret
- Screenplay by: Fabio Carpi; Luigi Malerba
- Produced by: Turi Vasile
- Starring: Michel Piccoli; Lisa Gastoni
- Cinematography: Ennio Guarnieri
- Edited by: Roberto Perpignani
- Music by: Riz Ortolani
- Release date: 1970
- Language: French

Invasion (French: L'Invasion, Italian: L'invasione) is a 1970 French-Italian drama film directed by Yves Allégret and starring Michel Piccoli and Lisa Gastoni.

== Cast ==
- Michel Piccoli as Marcello
- Lisa Gastoni as Marina
- Enzo Cerusico as Piero Nato
- Marzio Margine as Pablo
- Elio Marconato as Igi
- Mariangela Melato as Valentina
- Marella Corbi as Lu
- Orchidea De Santis as Ella
- John Fordyce as Furio
- Ruggero Miti as Leonard
- Eva Thulin as Sandra

== Reception ==
A contemporary Variety review described the film as a "misguided attempt to ride a modern theme in an old- fashioned way in direction, writing, playing and all other aspects". A Corriere della Sera review wrote that "the sixty-year-old director's eagerness to appear modern, relevant, and socially engaged" was "more than moving, embarrassing".
