= Il... Belpaese =

- Directed by: Luciano Salce
- Written by: Castellano & Pipolo; Luciano Salce; Paolo Villaggio
- Produced by: Fulvio Lucisano
- Starring: Paolo Villaggio; Silvia Dionisio
- Cinematography: Ennio Guarnieri
- Edited by: Antonio Siciliano
- Music by: Gianni Boncompagni; Piergiorgio Farina; Paolo Ormi
- Release date: 1977
- Running time: 115 minutes
- Country: Italy
- Language: Italian

Il... Belpaese (Italian for "The... Beautiful Country") is a 1977 black comedy film written and directed by Luciano Salce and starring Paolo Villaggio and Silvia Dionisio.

In the film, an Italian man spend several years working an oil platform in the Persian Gulf. When he returns to Italy, he experiences culture shock when realizing the country's social changes.

== Plot ==
Guido Berardinelli is an unfortunate tanker man, returned to Italy after eight years of work on an oil platform in the Persian Gulf. Guido doesn't know anything about the social movement in 1970s Italy, especially in Milan. When he arrives, he discovers that his "beautiful country" (belpaese) is a total disaster! However, Guido tries to live within the law, opening a watch store, but he is constantly being targeted by the Mafia...

== Cast ==
- Paolo Villaggio as Guido Berardinelli
- Silvia Dionisio as Mia
- Anna Mazzamauro as Miss Gruber
- Pino Caruso as Ovidio Camorrà
- Gigi Reder as Alfredo
- Giuliana Calandra as Elena
- Massimo Boldi as Carletto
- Raffaele Curi as Spadozza
- Ugo Bologna as The Bank Director
- Leo Gavero as The Jeweler
- Tom Felleghy as Andrea
- Carla Mancini as Lisetta
