= Submission (1976 film) =

- Directed by: Salvatore Samperi
- Written by: Salvatore Samperi; Ottavio Jemma
- Starring: Franco Nero; Lisa Gastoni
- Cinematography: Vittorio Storaro
- Music by: Riz Ortolani
- Release date: 1976
- Language: Italian

Submission (Italian: Scandalo, 'Scandal') is an Italian film filmed in technicolor and directed by Salvatore Samperi based on his own script written in collaboration with Ottavio Jemma, according to Samperi. It belongs to the drama and erotic genres and had as principal actors Franco Nero, Lisa Gastoni, Raymond Pellegrin and Andréa Ferréol.

== Plot ==
On a 1940 France, just before the great invasion, Eliane is a pharmacist who is married to her dull husband and has a teenage daughter. Eliane is an attractive woman who has let her passion fall dormant.

One evening, the pharmacy clerk makes a pass at her when he thinks she is another girl. Soon she lets the passion overtake her and she begins an affair with her employee. Armand, the pharmacy clerk, starts making ever-growing demands to Eliane, forcing her to have sex under the pharmacy counter and undress in front of a female employee of the pharmacy (who is also having an affair with Armand), among other demands, effectively turning her into his sex slave.

When Eliane finally let herself admit her submission to Armand, he demands her teenage daughter to prove she'd do anything for him.

== Cast ==
- Franco Nero as Armand
- Lisa Gastoni as Eliane Michoud
- Raymond Pellegrin as Prof. Henri Michoud
- Andréa Ferréol as Juliette
- Claudia Marsani as Justine Michoud
- Carla Calò as Carmen

== See also ==
- List of Italian films of 1976
