= Adultery Italian Style =

1966 film directed by Pasquale Festa Campanile

- Directed by: Pasquale Festa Campanile
- Written by: Pasquale Festa Campanile
- Cinematography: Roberto Gerardi
- Edited by: Ruggero Mastroianni
- Music by: Armando Trovajoli
- Release date: 1966
- Running time: 93 minutes
- Country: Italy
- Language: Italian

Adultery Italian Style (Italian: Adulterio all'italiana) is a 1966 Italian comedy film written and directed by Pasquale Festa Campanile.

== Plot ==
Engineer Franco Finali is caught red-handed by his wife Marta having an affair with Gloria, Marta's best friend. Marta agrees to stay with him, but only if he reciprocates by behaving the same way.

To avert a deeper marital crisis, Franco reluctantly agrees to this unusual arrangement. However, he quickly proves unable to wait and, consumed by jealousy, takes matters into his own hands. He ropes in Roberto, his best friend and colleague, who has secretly been in love with Marta for a long time. Marta pretends to engage in a romantic affair and strategically places "incriminating evidence" around the house to drive her husband to the brink. After comically playing the role of an inept investigator, Franco hires an equally inept adulterer. Falsely feeling guilty for a crime he didn't commit, Franco faces the risk of ulcer surgery and undergoes gastric lavage for a fake poisoning.

Following a series of ups and downs, a punished and remorseful Franco eventually earns forgiveness from his loyal Marta.

== Cast ==
- Nino Manfredi as Franco Finali
- Catherine Spaak as Marta Finali
- Maria Grazia Buccella as Gloria
- Vittorio Caprioli as Silvio Sasselli
- Akim Tamiroff as Max Portesi
- Mario Pisu as Vicino
- Gino Pernice as Roberto
- Lino Banfi as Marco
- Tullio Altamura as woman-chaser
- Gianni Solaro as another woman-chaser

== Production ==
The film had the working titles Un tigre nel mio cuore ('A tiger in my heart') and Un marito per mia moglie ('A husband for my wife'). The role of Max was originally intended for Buster Keaton, who had just completed filming War Italian Style in Italy.

== Reception ==
While panned by critics, the film was a major success, grossing over a billion lire at the Italian box office.
