= Un povero ricco =

- Directed by: Pasquale Festa Campanile
- Written by: Ottavio Jemma; Francesco Venturoli; Renato Pozzetto
- Cinematography: Franco Di Giacomo
- Music by: Stelvio Cipriani
- Release date: 1983
- Language: Italian

Un povero ricco, also known as Rich and Poor, is a 1983 Italian comedy film directed by Pasquale Festa Campanile.

== Plot ==
The engineer Eugenio Ronconi lives in Milan a comfortable life, but he is increasingly obsessed of losing all his wealth and become poor. On the advice of his psychologist, therefore he decides to "become" poor for about a month.

== Cast ==
- Renato Pozzetto: Eugenio Ronconi / Eugenio Ragona
- Ornella Muti: Marta
- Piero Mazzarella: Stanislao aka Fosforo
- Patrizia Fontana: Romina
- Nanni Svampa: butler
- Corrado Olmi: Neroni
- Ugo Gregoretti: psychologist

== See also ==
- List of Italian films of 1983
