= Hitch-Hike (film) =

1977 film by Pasquale Festa Campanile

- Italian film poster
- Italian: Autostop rosso sangue
- Directed by: Pasquale Festa Campanile
- Screenplay by: Ottavio Jemma; Aldo Crudo; Pasquale Festa Campanile
- Story by: Aldo Crudo
- Produced by: Bruno Turchetto; Mario Montanari
- Starring: Franco Nero; Corinne Cléry; David Hess
- Cinematography: Franco Di Giacomo; Giuseppe Ruzzolini
- Edited by: Antonio Siciliano
- Music by: Ennio Morricone
- Production companies: Explorer Film '58; Medusa Distribuzione
- Distributed by: Medusa Distribuzione
- Release date: 1977
- Running time: 104 minutes
- Country: Italy

Hitch-Hike (Italian: Autostop rosso sangue, lit. 'Blood-red hitchhiking', also known as Death Drive and The Naked Prey) is a 1977 Italian road thriller film co-written and directed by Pasquale Festa Campanile. The film stars Franco Nero and Corinne Cléry as a couple in a troubled marriage, and David Hess as a fugitive who takes them hostage. The musical score was written by Ennio Morricone.

== Plot ==
Walter Mancini (Nero), an alcoholic reporter, and his wife Eve (Cléry) are on a road trip with a trailer heading back to Los Angeles. Along the way, they pick up a hitch-hiker (Hess) who introduces himself as Adam Konitz. Konitz soon turns out to be a sadistic escapee from an institution for the criminally insane, and he is running from the law after robbing two million dollars with his partners. He takes the couple hostage and orders Eve to head to Mexico. They are soon stopped by two policemen and after Walter attempts to signal them by writing "SOS" on his matchbox, Konitz shoots them both.

While the three stop for the night, Konitz's two partners, whom he had betrayed to get all the loot for himself, shoot at Konitz and take control of the money and the car. They decide to keep the Mancinis alive until reaching the Mexican border. While driving, they are attacked by someone in a truck. The attacker turns out to be Konitz who kills his former associates and again takes the Mancinis hostage. After they reach a secluded place, Konitz strips and rapes Eve and forces Walter to watch the act. As Konitz gets ready to kill Walter, Eve shoots him with Walter's hunting rifle.

Despite Eve's opposition, Walter decides to keep the two million instead of going to the police. After four young motorcyclists the couple met at a gas station pass them and pour oil on the road, the Mancinis' car goes off the road and crashes. One of the youngsters takes three hundred from Walter's pocket, but leaves the suitcase on the back seat untouched. The thieves then ride away. Eve is badly hurt and requests help from Walter. Walter brings Konitz's body from their trailer and plants it on the accident scene. He then tells the dying Eve that the thieves had only helped him. He had planned to stop after 15 to 20 miles, kill her and make it look like an accident. After lighting up a cigarette and setting the car and the trailer on fire, Walter starts walking and, hearing a car come by, thumbs a ride.

== Cast ==
- Franco Nero as Walter Mancini
- Corinne Cléry (as Corinne Clery) as Eve Mancini
- David Hess as Adam Konitz
- Joshua Sinclair (as John Loffredo) as Oaks
- Carlo Puri as Hawk
- Ignazio Spalla (as Pedro Sanchez) as Mexican Way Station Clerk
- Leonardo Scavino (as Leon Lenor) as Mendoza
- Mónica Zanchi (as Monica Zanchi) as Campsite Lover
- Benito Pacifico as Highway Patrolman #1
- Angelo Ragusa as Highway Patrolman #2
- Luigi Birri as Motorcycle Punk #2
- Robert Sommer as Harry Stetson
- Ann Ferguson as Lucy Stetson
- Fausto Di Bella as Motorcycle Punk #1

== Production ==
The opening credits claim the film is based on a novel called The Violence and the Fury by Peter Kane. However, the attribution is likely fictional, no book by such an author is known to exist.

In The Devil Thumbs a Ride, a short documentary on the film, Nero states that he became involved in the film because he already knew Campanile well, and Campanile had earlier stated his wish to work with him. Nero was in Germany shooting 21 Hours at Munich, in which Hess also had a small role, when Campanile called him and suggested starring in Autostop rosso sangue. Because Hess wanted to work in Italy, Nero suggested him as the second male lead. Hess had earlier played a similar role in The Last House on the Left.

Just a few days before the shooting of the film began, Nero broke his arm at the set of the Spaghetti Western Keoma while giving a misbehaving horse a punch. Nero approached Campanile with his problem and the script was quickly modified. In the final script, Nero's character hurts his hand in the beginning of the film and Cléry's character drives the car.

Because filming in the United States would have been too expensive, the film was shot in the mountains of the Gran Sasso, around the city of L'Aquila and Crognaleto in central Italy. The location resembled Northern California, and American-like gas stations and signs were also created.

== Reception ==
In a contemporary review, the Monthly Film Bulletin, the film was condemned for being "dependent on heavy doses of violence to keep its predictable plot moving" and was "directed in a bland and featureless manner by Festa Campanile, and overtly portentous in its dialogue". The review concluded that it was "notable only for its extensive borrowings: Duel for the murderous truck that terrorises car and trailer on the mountain road; The Wild One and company for the motorcycle louts deliberately causing havoc on the highways; and numerous 'road' movies for its general format." Morricone's score was praised as an "attractive score, which makes fine use of a theme tune played on guitar, to its credit."
