= Pasquale Festa Campanile =

Italian screenwriter, film director and novelist

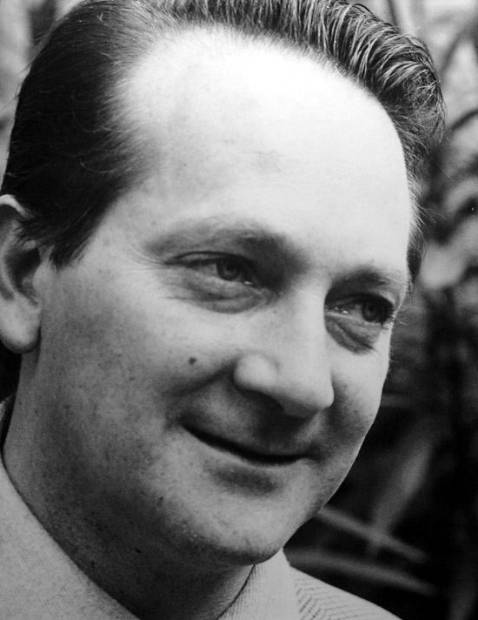
- Born: 28 July 1927; Melfi, Kingdom of Italy
- Died: 25 February 1986 (aged 58); Rome, Italy
- Occupations: Screenwriter; film director; novelist
- Years active: 1949–1984
- Spouse(s): Anna Salvatore (sep. 1962) Rosalba Mazzamuto (m. 1985)

Pasquale Festa Campanile (28 July 1927 – 25 February 1986) was an Italian screenwriter, film director and novelist, best known as a prominent exponent of the commedia all'italiana genre.

== Life and career ==
Born at Melfi, in the province of Potenza, he moved to Rome at young age. He started as a writer and literary critic. La nonna Sabella, one of his novels, was later adapted by Dino Risi into the movie of the same name, internationally known as Oh! Sabella (1957).

He began his cinema career as a screenwriter with Faddija – La legge della vendetta (1949) by Roberto Bianchi Montero and later co-produced masterpieces of Italian cinema such as Poor, But Handsome (1957) by Risi and Rocco and His Brothers (1960) and The Leopard (1963) by Luchino Visconti.

His first film as a director was A Sentimental Attempt (1963), along with Massimo Franciosa. Subsequently he made many films of the commedia all'italiana genre, including La Matriarca (1969), Secret Fantasy (1971), Jus primae noctis (1972) and The Sex Machine (1975), the latter is based on his novel with the same name.

Pasquale Festa Campanile had a collaboration with Italian singer and actor Adriano Celentano, directing him in films like Rugantino (1973), Qua la mano (1980) and Bingo Bongo (1982). Other notable movies include Soldier of Fortune, a satirical revisiting of the challenge of Barletta; the crime film Hitch-Hike (1977); the LGBT-themed Nessuno è perfetto (1981); Petomaniac (1983), loosely based on French entertainer Joseph Pujol and A Proper Scandal (1984), inspired by the Bruneri-Canella case which is also his last cinematographic work.

He died of a kidney tumor in Rome in 1986.

== Personal life ==
Festa Campanile was married to Italian painter Anna Salvatore, from whom he separated in 1962. Later he was linked to actresses Maria Grazia Spina, Catherine Spaak and Lilli Carati. He married his last wife, Rosalba Mazzamuto, a year prior to his death.

== Filmography ==
=== Director ===
- A Sentimental Attempt (1953)
- White Voices (1964)
- La costanza della ragione (1965)
- A Maiden for a Prince (1965)
- Adultery Italian Style (1966)
- On My Way to the Crusades, I Met a Girl Who... (1967)
- Il marito è mio e l'ammazzo quando mi pare (1967)
- The Girl and the General (1967)
- The Libertine (1968)
- Check to the Queen (1969)
- Con quale amore, con quanto amore (1969)
- Where Are You Going All Naked? (1969)
- When Women Had Tails (1970)
- Secret Fantasy (1971)
- When Women Lost Their Tails (1971)
- La calandria (1972)
- Jus primae noctis (1972)
- Little Funny Guy (1973)
- Rugantino (1973)
- The Gamecock (1974)
- The Sex Machine (1975)
- Tell Me You Do Everything for Me (1976)
- Soldier of Fortune (1976)
- Hitch-Hike (1977)
- Cara sposa (1977)
- How to Lose a Wife and Find a Lover (1978)
- Saturday, Sunday and Friday (1979)
- Il ritorno di Casanova (1979)
- Il corpo della ragassa (1979)
- Gegè Bellavita (1979)
- Il ladrone (1980)
- Qua la mano (1980)
- Nessuno è perfetto (1981)
- Culo e camicia (1981)
- Mano lesta (1981)
- Bingo Bongo (1982)
- The Girl from Trieste (1982)
- Più bello di così si muore (1982)
- Porca vacca (1982)
- Un povero ricco (1983)
- Petomaniac (1983)
- A Proper Scandal (1984)

=== Screenwriter ===
- Faddija (1949)
- A Sentimental Attempt (1953)
- Wild Love (1955)
- La donna che venne dal mare (1957)
- Oh! Sabella (1957)
- Poor, But Handsome (1957)
- Pretty But Poor (1957)
- Il cocco di mamma (1957)
- Vacanze a Ischia (1957)
- Young Husbands (1958)
- Ladro lui, ladra lei (1958)
- Toto and Marcellino (1958)
- Everyone's in Love (1958)
- Venice, the Moon and You (1958)
- Ferdinando I Re di Napoli (1959)
- The Magistrate (1959)
- La cento chilometri (1959)
- Poor Millionaires (1959)
- Rocco and His Brothers (1960)
- The Assassin (1961)
- The Lovemakers (1961)
- La bellezza di Ippolita (1962)
- The Four Days of Naples (1962)
- Smog (1962)
- The Leopard (1963)
- In Italia si chiama amore (1963)
- Senza sole né luna (1963)
- The Conjugal Bed (1963)
- White Voices (1964)
- La costanza della ragione (1965)
- A Maiden for a Prince (1965)
- Adultery Italian Style (1966)
- The Girl and the General (1967)
- Where Are You Going All Naked? (1969)
- When Women Had Tails (1970)
- Secret Fantasy (1971)
- La calandria (1972)
- Jus primae noctis (1972)
- Little Funny Guy (1973)
- Rugantino (1973)
- The Gamecock (1974)
- The Sex Machine (1975)
- Soldier of Fortune (1976)
- Hitch-Hike (1977)
- Gegè Bellavita (1979)
- Qua la mano (1980)
- Un povero ricco (1983)

== Bibliography ==
- La nonna Sabella (1957)
- Conviene far bene l'amore (1975)
- Il ladrone (1977)
- Il peccato (1980)
- La ragazza di Trieste (1982)
- Per amore, solo per amore (1984)
- La strega innamorata (1985)
- Buon Natale, buon anno (1986)
- La felicità è una cosa magnifica (2017)
