= Giuseppe Ruzzolini =

Italian cinematographer

- Born: 21 May 1930; Rome, Italy
- Died: 16 April 2007 (aged 76); Rome, Italy
- Occupation: Cinematographer

Giuseppe Ruzzolini (21 May 1930 – 16 April 2007) was an Italian cinematographer.

== Career ==
Ruzzolini is known for lensing such films as Stephen King's Firestarter, Oedipus Rex, Sergio Leone's Duck, You Sucker!, and My Name is Nobody.

== Filmography ==
Year	Film	Notes
1966	Francesco di Assisi	TV movie
1966	Maigret a Pigalle	
1967	Oedipus Rex	
1967	The Subversives	
1968	Bandits in Milan	Uncredited
1968	Teorema	
1968	Dismissed on His Wedding Night	
1968	Eat It	
1969	Love and Anger	Segment: "The sequence of the paper flower"
1969	Pigsty	With Tonino Delli Colli and Armando Nannuzzi
1969	The Thirteen Chairs	
1969	Burn!	
1970	Let's Have a Riot	
1971	Roma Bene	
1971	Duck, You Sucker!	
1971	Short Night of Glass Dolls	
1972	Chronicle of a Homicide	
1972	The Scientific Cardplayer	
1972	What?	
1972	Il terrore con gli occhi storti	
1973	The Nun and the Devil	
1973	My Name Is Nobody	
1974	Arabian Nights	
1974	Allonsanfàn	
1975	Piedone a Hong Kong	
1975	Mondo candido	
1975	A Genius, Two Partners and a Dupe	
1976	A Common Sense of Modesty	
1976	Basta che non si sappia in giro	Segment: "L'equivoco"
1977	Cara sposa	
1977	Hitch-Hike	
1977	The Son of the Sheik	
1978	Il furto della Gioconda	TV miniseries (3 episodes)
1978	How to Lose a Wife and Find a Lover	
1979	Tigers in Lipstick	
1979	Happy Hobos	
1979	Il corpo della ragassa	
1981	Culo e camicia	Segment: "Il Televeggente"
1982	Verdi	TV miniseries (8 episodes)
1983	Treasure of the Four Crowns	
1983	Quer pasticciaccio brutto de via Merulana	TV miniseries (4 episodes)
1983	Un'età da sballo	
1984	Firestarter	
1985	Woman of Wonders	
1985	All the Fault of Paradise	
1986	Lady of the Night	
1986	The Malady of Love	
1986	Stregati	
1987	A Taxi Driver in New York	
1988	Bye Bye Baby	
1988	Rimini Rimini - Un anno dopo	
1988	Una botta di vita	
1989	12 registi per 12 città	Segment: "Bari"
1990	Voyage of Terror: The Achille Lauro Affair	TV movie
1990	Arrivederci Roma	Short film
1991	The Last Match	
1993	For Love, Only for Love	
1993	Anni 90: Parte II	
2000	Body Guards	
