= Where Are You Going All Naked? =

1969 Italian comedy film

- Directed by: Pasquale Festa Campanile
- Cinematography: Roberto Gerardi
- Edited by: Marcello Malvestito
- Music by: Armando Trovajoli
- Release date: September 12, 1969
- Language: Italian

Dove vai tutta nuda?, internationally released as Where Are You Going All Naked?, is a 1969 Italian comedy film directed by Pasquale Festa Campanile.

== Cast ==
- Maria Grazia Buccella: Tonino
- Tomas Milian: Manfredo
- Gastone Moschin: President
- Vittorio Gassman: Rufus Conforti
- Angela Luce: Prostitute
- Giancarlo Badessi: Waiter
- Lea Lander: President's Wife
