= How to Lose a Wife and Find a Lover =

- Directed by: Pasquale Festa Campanile
- Cinematography: Giuseppe Ruzzolini
- Music by: Gianni Ferrio
- Release date: 1978
- Language: Italian

How to Lose a Wife and Find a Lover (Italian: Come perdere una moglie e trovare un'amante) is a 1978 Italian comedy film directed by Pasquale Festa Campanile.

== Plot ==
Alberto, publicity manager for a big dairy company, returns home early after crashing into the car of a beautiful woman named Eleonora, only to find his wife in the bath and the plumber hiding naked in the shower. Falling into a suicidal frame of mind over this betrayal, he consults a psychoanalyst. Another patient is Eleonora, also suicidal after the infidelity of her husband, and the shrink separately advises each of them to get up into the mountains for a rest. By chance both take a room in the same tiny and remote inn, though Alberto does not recognise the woman with whose car he collided months ago. A young friend of Eleonora's named Marisa turns up to find there are no spare rooms, so she shares Eleonora's bed.

In the evenings the landlord pours the grappa liberally and, while Eleonora has got up for some fresh air, a very drunk Alberto creeps into the bed to find a very willing Marisa. She is sent home for this exploit, but Alberto then gets even more drunk and beds the very large but equally willing landlady. Following that, after his room is flooded by an overflowing bath, he clambers wet and drunk into Eleonora's bed. In the morning she is furious to find him there and heads out skiing, while he follows attempting to explain. The two crash into an isolated haystack, where sounds and movements suggest they consummate their attraction. Entwined together and frozen stiff, they are found by a mountain rescue team whose volunteer chaplain marries the unconscious couple in articulo mortis. Once fit enough Alberto goes back to work but Eleonora has disappeared, leaving no address or telephone number. When a casting is held for models to appear in the company's advertisements, one hopeful is Marisa who has been given a lift to the offices by Eleonora. Alberto looks out of the window and sees her at last.

== Cast ==
- Johnny Dorelli as Dr. Alberto Castelli
- Barbara Bouchet as Eleonora Rubens
- Carlo Bagno as Anselmo
- Toni Ucci as Brother Francesco
- Felice Andreasi as Dr. Rossini
- Enzo Cannavale as The Guru
- Elsa Vazzoler as Anita
- Stefania Casini as Marisa
