= The Gamecock (film) =

- Directed by: Pasquale Festa Campanile
- Screenplay by: Silvano Ambrogi; Pasquale Festa Campanile; Luigi Malerba
- Story by: Piero Regnoli; Alfonso Brescia
- Starring: Sydne Rome
- Cinematography: Salvatore Caruso
- Edited by: Mario Morra
- Music by: Gianni Ferrio
- Release date: 1974
- Country: Italy
- Language: Italian

The Gamecock (Italian: La sculacciata, lit. The spanking) is a 1974 Italian comedy film directed by Pasquale Festa Campanile. It is based on the comedy play Neurotandem (1968) by Silvano Ambrogi.

== Plot ==
Carlo and Elena are a married couple. After years of common life, Carlo loses his virility. Elena resorts to sadomasochist practices in the hope of addressing the issue.

== Cast ==
- Sydne Rome as Elena
- Antonio Salines as Carlo Amatriciani
- Roberto Antonelli as Chimico
- Paolo Gozlino as Doctor
- Toni Ucci as Friar
- Marisa Bartoli as Veronica
- Vincenzo Crocitti as Padrone di Elena

== Reception ==
Italian contemporary reviews were rather negative. One stated, "A "chamber comedy" in all possible meanings of the expression, this film is too thin in its plot and too annoying in the schematic and planned succession of its typically theatrical scenes succession, which, most often interpreted in the spirit of light farce or bawdy joke, although not falling into the most vulgar decameronism, do not sufficiently develop the lubricity of the matter and do not allow sufficient expression for moral ideas."; another commented, "Overall, La sculacciata appears quite harmless on a sexual level and on a caricatural level all too obvious and well-known. As an experiment to demystify sex, on the other hand, the film is too weak to achieve its aim [...]. The ending (where) good taste remains forcibly absent is particularly questionable."

== See also ==
- List of Italian films of 1974
