= L'assoluto naturale =

- Directed by: Mauro Bolognini
- Starring: Laurence Harvey; Sylva Koscina
- Cinematography: Ennio Guarnieri
- Edited by: Nino Baragli
- Music by: Ennio Morricone
- Release date: 8 September 1969
- Country: Italy
- Languages: Italian; English

L'assoluto naturale (internationally released as He and She and She and He) is a 1969 Italian drama film directed by Mauro Bolognini.

The plot focuses on a mysterious romance involving an uninhibited woman (Koscina) and a dour photographer (Harvey), shot in strange modernist interiors and abstract "sports car on a highway to nowhere" exteriors.

The work of cinematographer Ennio Guarnieri in this film has been referred to as "one of the cornerstones of Italian photography in the sixties".

== Plot ==
Peter, a young English photographer on vacation in Italy, crosses paths with Ella, an attractive bourgeois lady. They decide to travel together, and when their vehicle breaks down, it leads to a physical relationship. Despite an initial strong connection, their relationship faces challenges. Peter, a romantic intellectual, sees love as an "absolute" merging of body and spirit, while Ella views love primarily as carnal pleasure.

As their differences become more apparent, Peter dreams of an idealistic love, while Ella embraces a more hedonistic approach. In an attempt to influence Peter, Ella involves herself with two mechanics, triggering jealousy. She dismisses one of his romantic manuscripts and highlights the mating habits of silkworms, inviting him to explore the women in her family. Despite Ella's efforts, Peter becomes convinced of their total incompatibility.

Recognizing the end of their relationship, Peter decides to go his own way, contemplating suicide. Staying true to her character, Ella runs him over with her car.

== Cast ==
- Laurence Harvey as He
- Sylva Koscina as She
- Isa Miranda as Mother
- Felicity Mason as Aunt
- Guido Mannari as Mechanic
