= Jus primae noctis (film) =

- Directed by: Pasquale Festa Campanile
- Starring: Lando Buzzanca; Renzo Montagnani; Marilù Tolo; Paolo Stoppa
- Cinematography: Silvano Ippoliti
- Edited by: Nino Baragli
- Music by: Riz Ortolani
- Release date: 1972
- Country: Italy
- Language: Italian

Jus primae noctis is a 1972 Italian comedy film directed by Pasquale Festa Campanile.

== Plot ==
A nobleman, Ariberto de Ficulle, acquires a small feudal estate after marrying an ugly woman and attempts to use a medieval custom that gives him the right of the lord to sleep with a vassal's bride on her wedding night.

== Cast ==
- Lando Buzzanca as Ariberto da Ficulle
- Renzo Montagnani as Gandolfo
- Marilù Tolo as Venerata
- Felice Andreasi as Friar Puccio
- Toni Ucci as Guidone
- Paolo Stoppa as the Pope
- Gino Pernice as Marculfo
- Ely Galleani as Beata
- Alberto Sorrentino as the Friar
- Giancarlo Cobelli as Curiale
- Ignazio Leone
- Clara Colosimo
