= Carlo Bagno =

Italian actor (1920–1990)

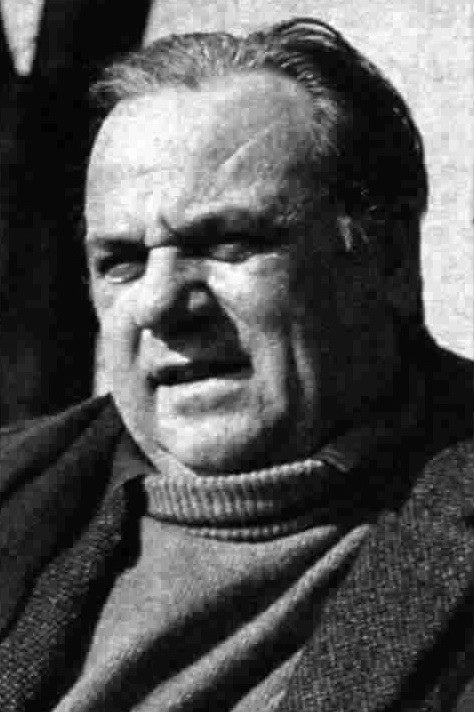
- Carlo Bagno in 1974
- Born: 21 March 1920; Lendinara, Rovigo, Italy
- Died: 19 January 1990 (aged 69); Milan, Italy
- Occupation: Actor

Carlo Bagno (21 March 1920 – 19 January 1990) was an Italian actor.

== Life and career ==
Born in Lendinara, Rovigo, Bagno studied acting at the Accademia Nazionale di Arte Drammatica Silvio D'Amico, graduating in 1941.

Bagno was mainly active on stage, where he was appreciated especially as an actor of Ruzante plays and as a member of the Piccolo Teatro in Milan.

Bagno was also active on radio, television and cinema. In 1978 he won a Nastro d'Argento for best supporting actor for his performance in Luigi Magni's In the Name of the Pope King.

== Partial filmography ==
- Lo svitato (1956)
- The Police Commissioner (1962) - Dr. Longo (uncredited)
- Il successo (1963) - Varelli
- The Terrorist (1963) - Oscar Varino
- I mostri (1963) - Presiding Judge (segment "Testimone volontario")
- Love in Four Dimensions (1964) - Trapattoni, il tassista (segment "Amore e alfabeto")
- The Birds, the Bees and the Italians (1966) - Bepi Cristofoletto
- Shoot Loud, Louder... I Don't Understand (1966) - Il maresciallo Bagnacavallo
- The Climax (1967) - Mr. Malagugini
- La piazza vuota (1971)
- Gli ordini sono ordini (1972)
- Anno uno (1974) - Comunista milanese
- Dracula in the Provinces (1975) - Head Worker
- Una sera c'incontrammo (1975) - Father of Rosa
- Goodnight, Ladies and Gentlemen (1976) - Macaluso an Entrant to the Disgraziometro Show
- In the Name of the Pope King (1977) - Serafino - il segrario perpetuo di Colombo
- Cara sposa (1977) - Elvira's companion
- How to Lose a Wife and Find a Lover (1978) - Anselmo
- A Dangerous Toy (1979) - Un secondino
- Mimi (1979) - Doctor Vanetti
- Hypochondriac (1979) - Dr. Anzalone
- Tesoro mio (1979)
- Qua la mano (1980) - The Bishop
- Ombre (1980) - Monica's Father
- Arrivano i bersaglieri (1980) - Pio IX
- Portrait of a Woman, Nude (1981) - Giovanni
- Culo e camicia (1981) - Renato's Father
- Bertoldo, Bertoldino e Cacasenno (1984)
- The Two Lives of Mattia Pascal (1985) - Pellegrinotto, dattilografo
- Teresa (1987) - Mate of teresa in the crashing truck (final film role)
