= La sbandata =

1974 film by Salvatore Samperi

- Directed by: Alfredo Malfatti; Salvatore Samperi (supervising)
- Written by: Salvatore Samperi; Ottavio Jemma
- Based on: Il volantino by Pietro A. Buttitta
- Produced by: Sergio Bonotti; Salvatore Samperi
- Starring: Domenico Modugno; Eleonora Giorgi
- Cinematography: Franco Di Giacomo
- Edited by: Sergio Montanari
- Music by: Domenico Modugno
- Distributed by: Titanus
- Release date: 1974
- Running time: 95 minutes
- Country: Italy
- Language: Italian

La sbandata is a 1974 commedia sexy all'italiana film directed by Alfredo Malfatti (supervised by Salvatore Samperi). According to several sources the film was actually directed by Samperi but signed by his assistant director for contract issues.

It is an adaptation of the novel Il volantino (1965) by Pietro A. Buttitta and was filmed in Acireale, Forza D'Agro Province of Messina and Sant'Alfio, Province of Catania.

== Plot ==
Salvatore Cannavone (Domenico Modugno) is a Sicilian cobbler-cum-shoe salesman who has worked for thirty years in New York City. He returns to his hometown where, although of modest means in America, he is considered a wealthy man and becomes the centre of attraction. He begins to live with his brother Raffaele (Pippo Franco), his wife Rosa (Luciana Paluzzi), and his stepdaughter Mariuccia (Eleonora Giorgi) and, starting from their first meet, he and Mariuccia get busy with games of seduction. Raffaelle notices Salvatore's interest in Mariuccia and attempts to make use of it to have him stay at their house and to exploit his wealth. On the other hand, Salvatore also has an eye on voluptuous Rosa and both Mariuccia and Rosa begin to see Salvatore's passion as a means to secure the economic benefits he provides, which eventually leads to a peculiar ménage à trois. Things get even more complicated when Mariuccia is betrothed to another man.
