= The Sex Machine =

1975 film by Pasquale Festa Campanile

- Directed by: Pasquale Festa Campanile
- Starring: Gigi Proietti; Agostina Belli; Eleonora Giorgi; Christian De Sica; Mario Scaccia; Adriana Asti
- Cinematography: Franco Di Giacomo
- Edited by: Sergio Montanari
- Music by: Fred Bongusto
- Release date: 1975
- Country: Italy
- Language: Italian

The Sex Machine (Italian: Conviene far bene l'amore, lit. 'Love is worth making well"', also known as Love and Energy) is a 1975 sci-fi commedia sexy all'italiana film directed by Pasquale Festa Campanile. The film is based on a novel with the same name written by the same Campanile.

== Cast ==
- Gigi Proietti as Prof. Enrico Coppola
- Agostina Belli as Francesca Renzi
- Eleonora Giorgi as Piera
- Christian De Sica as Daniele Venturoli
- Mario Scaccia as Mons. Alberoni
- Adriana Asti as Irene Nobili
- Franco Agostini as Dr. Spina
- Monica Strebel as Angela
- Quinto Parmeggiani as De Renzi
- Gino Pernice as Coppola's Assistant
- Mario Pisu as Minister
- Franco Angrisano as Hotel Director
- Enzo Robutti as Matteis
- Oreste Lionello as Driver
- Aldo Reggiani
- Pietro Tordi

== Bibliography ==
- Willis, Donald C. (1985), Variety's Complete Science Fiction Reviews, Garland Publishing Inc., p. 299, ISBN 0824087127
