= Maria Grazia Spina =

Italian actress (1936–2025)

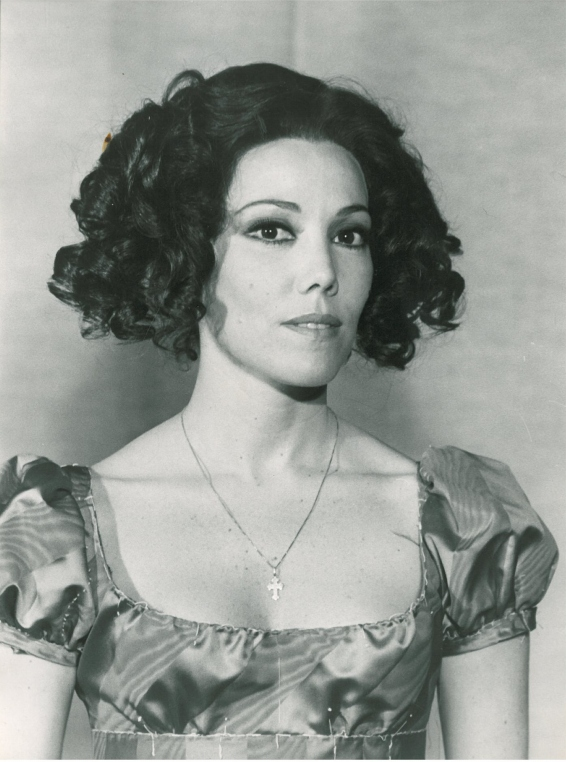
- Spina in Rugantino (1973)
- Born: Maria Grazia Spinazzi; 3 June 1936; Venice, Kingdom of Italy
- Died: 13 March 2025 (aged 88); Padua, Italy
- Other names: Grazia Maria Spina
- Occupation: Actress
- Years active: 1958–1983

Maria Grazia Spina (3 June 1936 – 13 March 2025) was an Italian television, film and stage actress.

== Life and career ==
Born Maria Grazia Spinazzi in Venice, Spina debuted as an actress with the theatrical company Stabile di Trieste, then worked with the companies of Vittorio Gassman, Aroldo Tieri, Elisa Cegani, and Glauco Mauri. She also had a prolific film career, but despite a great number of appearances, especially in comedies and adventure films, she failed to emerge. Her television career was more rewarding, and she had the opportunities to star in roles of weight in successful TV series. She hosted the 1965 edition of the Sanremo Music Festival.

Spina died on 13 March 2025 at the age of 88.

== Partial filmography ==
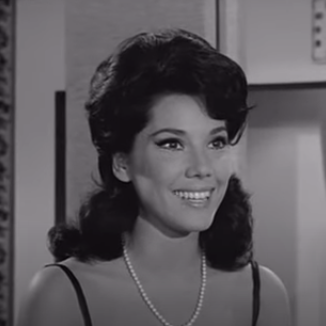
Spina in Pugni, pupe e marinai (1961)

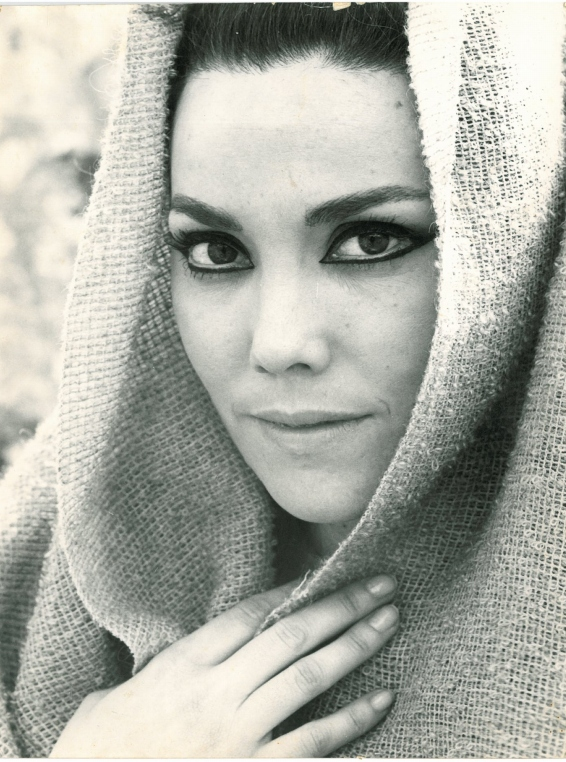
Spina in The Bible: In the Beginning... (1966)

- La vita degli altri (1957) - Luisa
- Promesse di marinaio (1958)
- The Adventures of Nicholas Nickleby (1958, TV series) - Maddalena Bray
- Men and Noblemen (1959) - La ragazza dell'albergo
- La cento chilometri (1959) - The Flute Player Friend of Elena
- Juke box urli d'amore (1959)
- The Cossacks (1960) - Alina
- Call Girls of Rome (1960) - Silvana
- Il peccato degli anni verdi (1960) - Giulia Giordani
- Revenge of the Conquered (1961)
- Ursus and the Tartar Princess (1961) - Amia
- Pugni, pupe e marinai (1961) - Grazia
- Zorro alla corte di Spagna (1962) - Consuelo
- Kerim, Son of the Sheik (1962) - Laila
- Tiger of the Seven Seas (1962) - Anna de Cordoba
- The Black Duke (1963) - Ginevra Cavalcanti
- Zorro and the Three Musketeers (1963) - Manuela
- La donna degli altri è sempre più bella (1963) - Savina (segment "Bagnino Lover")
- Samson and the Slave Queen (1963) - Isabella de Alazon
- Il Successo (1963) - Diana
- Hercules Against the Mongols (1963) - Ljuba
- Toto vs. the Black Pirate (1964) - Isabella
- Let the Shooters Shoot (1964) - Corinne Martin
- Queste pazze pazze donne (1964) - Santuzza - Turiddu's wife ('Siciliani a Milano')
- Revolt of the Barbarians (1964) - Lydia
- Le tardone (1964) - Barbara (episode "Un delitto quasi perfetto")
- Highest Pressure (1965) - Presentatrice
- Me, Me, Me... and the Others (1966) - Nicetta, Peppino's Niece
- The Bible: In the Beginning... (1966) - Daughter of Lot
- I 2 magnifici fresconi (1969) - Santuzza / Barbara
- Fermate il mondo... voglio scendere! (1970) - (uncredited)
- La calandria (1972) - Clizia - maid
- Rugantino (1973) - Donna Marta Capitelli
- La madama (1976)
- Tell Me You Do Everything for Me (1976) - Paola Signorini - Francesco's lover
- Violent Naples (1976) - Gervasi's Wife
- Il ritorno di Casanova (1980)
