= Nessuno è perfetto =

- Italian theatrical release poster
- Directed by: Pasquale Festa Campanile
- Cinematography: Alfio Contini
- Music by: Riz Ortolani
- Release date: 1981
- Language: Italian

Nessuno è perfetto (Nobody's Perfect) is a 1981 Italian comedy film directed by Pasquale Festa Campanile. The film was a great commercial success, grossing over 10 billion lire at the Italian box office. For her performance Ornella Muti won the Globo d'oro for best actress.

== Plot ==
Guerrino, a prematurely widowed businessman, falls in love with Chantal. Later he discovers that she was a former paratrooper in the German army who changed sex a few years earlier.

== Cast ==
- Renato Pozzetto as Guerrino Castiglione
- Ornella Muti as Chantal
- Lina Volonghi as mother-in-law of Guerrino
- Felice Andreasi as Enzo
- Massimo Boldi as taxi driver "Lingua profonda"
- Gabriele Tinti as Nanni

== See also ==
- List of Italian films of 1981
