= White Voices =

1964 film

- Film poster
- Directed by: Pasquale Festa Campanile; Massimo Franciosa
- Written by: Pasquale Festa Campanile; Massimo Franciosa; Luigi Magni
- Produced by: Nello Meniconi; Luciano Perugia
- Starring: Paolo Ferrari
- Cinematography: Ennio Guarnieri
- Edited by: Ruggero Mastroianni
- Music by: Gino Marinuzzi Jr.
- Release date: 13 August 1964
- Running time: 93 minutes
- Country: Italy
- Language: Italian

White Voices (Italian: Le voci bianche) is a 1964 Italian comedy film directed by Pasquale Festa Campanile and Massimo Franciosa. It was screened out of competition at the 1964 Cannes Film Festival. A young man in a choir of castrati falls for the beautiful wife of a powerful aristocrat, in 18th century Rome.

== Cast ==
- Paolo Ferrari as Meo
- Sandra Milo as Carolina
- Graziella Granata as Teresa
- Anouk Aimée as Lorenza
- Vittorio Caprioli as Matteuccio
- Jeanne Valérie as Maria
- Philippe Leroy as Don Ascanio
- Barbara Steele as Giulia
- Leopoldo Trieste as Orapronobbi
- Jacqueline Sassard as Eugenia
- Claudio Gora as Marchionne
- Jean Tissier as Principe Savello
