= Felice Andreasi =

Italian actor (1928–2005)

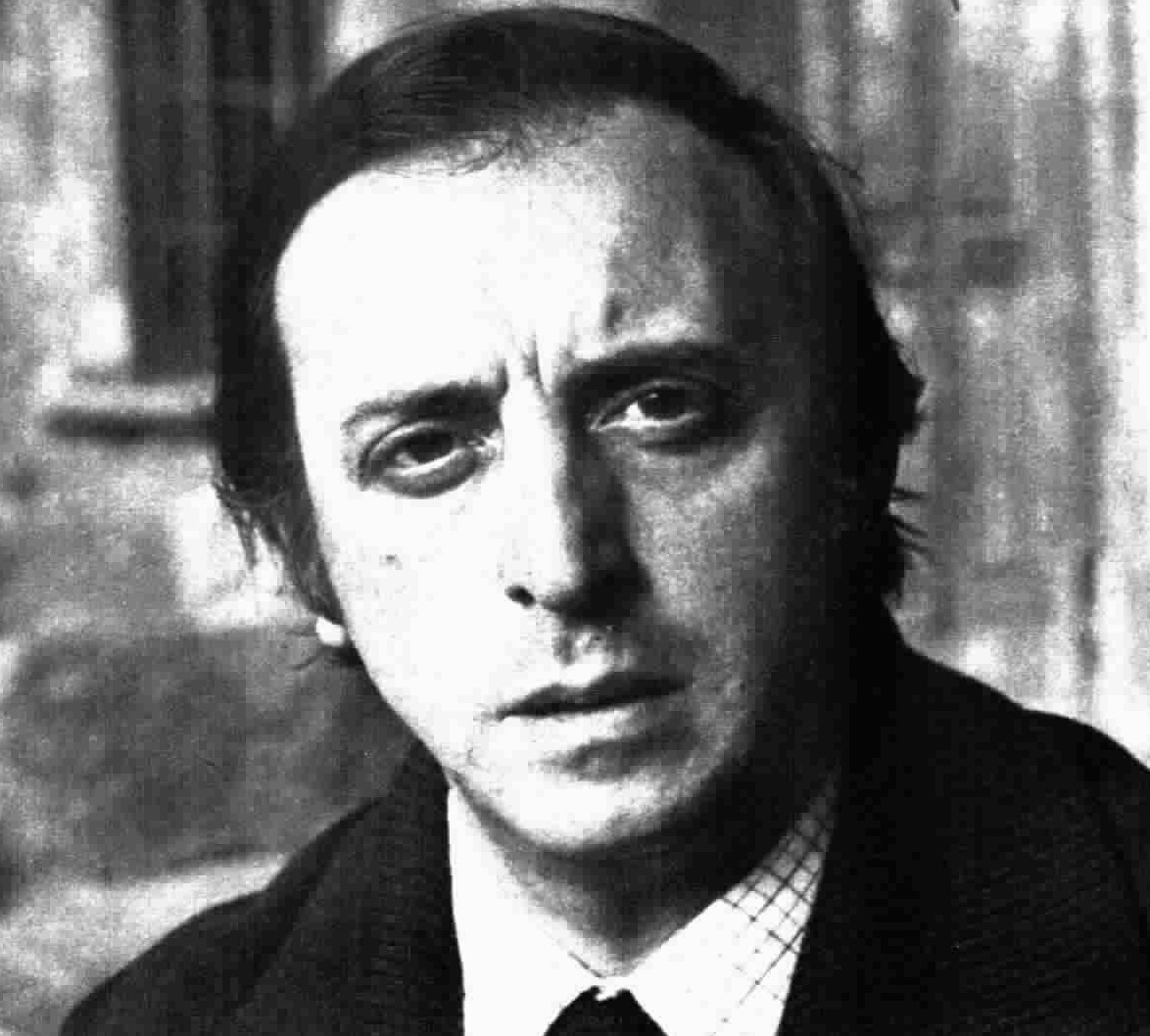
- Born: 8 January 1928; Turin, Italy
- Died: 25 December 2005 (aged 77); Cortazzone, Italy
- Occupation: Actor

Felice Andreasi (8 January 1928, in Turin – 25 December 2005, in Cortazzone) was an Italian film, television, and stage actor. He appeared in over 50 films in Italy between 1972 and 2005.

== Biography ==
He was considered one of the leading stage actors in comic and satirical theatre in Milan.

Andreasi won a Nastro d'Argento for Best Supporting Actor award for his role in Pane e Tulipani ("Bread and Tulips") (1999). He died of Parkinson's disease in 2005.

== Partial filmography ==
- Jus primae noctis (1972) – Frate Puccio
- Fiorina la vacca (1972) – Compare Michelon
- Dentro la casa della vecchia signora (1973)
- Claretta and Ben (1974) – Peppino Lo Taglio
- The Suspect (1975) – Alessandri
- Goodnight, Ladies and Gentlemen (1976) – Valet of Conclave
- Sturmtruppen (1976) – Sergeant
- Luna di miele in tre (1976) – Hotel director
- Come ti rapisco il pupo (1976) – Ispettore Sessa
- Man in a Hurry (1977) – Le réceptionniste de l'hôtel Daniela
- Ecco noi per esempio (1977)
- Io tigro, tu tigri, egli tigra (1978) – Il Generale
- Saxofone (1978) – Dottor Gatullo
- How to Lose a Wife and Find a Lover (1978) – Dottor Rossini
- Le braghe del padrone (1978) – Verzelli
- Geppo il folle (1978)
- Love in First Class (1980) – Oscar Della Rosa
- Nessuno è perfetto (1981) – Enzo
- L'esercito più pazzo del mondo (1981) – Ministro Difensa
- Il sommergibile più pazzo del mondo (1982) – Cristoforo Passero, Il Capitano
- Sturmtruppen 2 (tutti al fronte) (1982)
- Bingo Bongo (1982) – Professor Fprtis
- Petomaniac (1983) – Avv. Mercier
- Mani di fata (1983) – L'ammiraglio
- The Strangeness of Life (1988) – Father of Nora
- The Story of Boys & Girls (1989) – Domenico
- Musica per vecchi animali (1989) – Astice
- Faccia di lepre (1990) – Avv. Del Moro
- Il caso Martello (1991) – Antonio / Sebastiano Martello
- Lettera da Parigi (1992) – Professor
- A Soul Split in Two (1993) – Savino
- Bonus malus (1993) – Padre Marco
- Quando le montagne finiscono (1994) – Father
- Papà dice messa (1996) – Vescovo
- Muzungu (1999) – Father Luca
- Bread and Tulips (2000) – Fermo
- Johnny the Partisan (2000) – Mugnaio
- La regina degli scacchi (2001) – Judge
- Two Friends (2002) – Padrone di casa
- Fortezza Bastiani (2002) – Professore
- La collezione invisibile (2003) – Ottavio
- Ora e per sempre (2004) – Treves
