= The Girl from Trieste =

- Italian theatrical release poster by Renato Casaro
- Directed by: Pasquale Festa Campanile
- Written by: Pasquale Festa Campanile
- Starring: Ben Gazzara; Ornella Muti
- Cinematography: Alfio Contini
- Music by: Riz Ortolani
- Release date: 1982
- Country: Italy
- Language: Italian

La Ragazza di Trieste, internationally released as The Girl from Trieste, is a 1982 Italian romance-drama film directed by Pasquale Festa Campanile and based on a novel of the same name written by the director. It recounts a doomed love affair between a conventional man and a mentally unstable girl with suicidal tendencies.

== Plot ==
Dino, a comic book illustrator who lives by the sea near Trieste sits at a beach café one morning to draw, when he sees the rescue of a beautiful young woman who has tried to drown herself. He offers her a towel to cover herself, which she returns next day and thanks him by making love before she disappears. Each struck by the other, they meet at intervals but apart from her name, which is Nicole, he is only given evasions and fantasies. In addition to her unpredictable mood changes, he is also perturbed by her tendency to attract male attention by sexual exhibitionism.

She is revealed to be a patient in an open psychiatric hospital who is not able to have a stable relationship, let alone marriage. When Dino accidentally learns this, he goes off on a trip to Venice with his ex-wife. On his return Nicole is worse, but his continued love for her leads him to suggest that she lives with him. He takes her for a trip to Paris, where her facade of normality begins to crack. Back at his house she becomes impossible to live with, losing her grip on reality and cutting off all her hair. While he is sitting drawing at the beach café one morning, he sees her walking into the sea to drown herself.

== Cast ==
- Ben Gazzara as Dino Romani
- Ornella Muti as Nicole
- Mimsy Farmer as Valeria
- Andréa Ferréol as Stefanutti
- Jean-Claude Brialy as Professor Martin
- William Berger as Charly
- Consuelo Ferrara as Francesca
- Romano Puppo as Toni

== See also ==
- List of Italian films of 1982
