= Secret Fantasy =

1971 film by Pasquale Festa Campanile

- Italian: Il merlo maschio
- Directed by: Pasquale Festa Campanile
- Screenplay by: Pasquale Festa Campanile
- Based on: Il complesso di Loth; 1968 story by Luciano Bianciardi
- Produced by: Silvio Clementelli; Edward L. Montoro
- Starring: Lando Buzzanca; Laura Antonelli
- Cinematography: Silvano Ippoliti
- Edited by: Mario Morra; Sergio Montanari
- Music by: Riz Ortolani
- Release date: September 22, 1971; Italy
- Running time: 112 minutes
- Country: Italy
- Language: Italian

Secret Fantasy (Italian: Il merlo maschio, lit. 'The Male Blackbird'), known as The Naked Cello in the United Kingdom, is an Italian film in the commedia sexy all'italiana style, and presents a theme of candaulism, which was very rare at the time. It was filmed in 1971 by director Pasquale Festa Campanile, and starred Laura Antonelli and Lando Buzzanca.

== Synopsis ==
Niccolò Vivaldi is a frustrated cello player whose career has stalled and who feels unappreciated by the orchestra's director.

He discovers that his wife Costanza's beauty arouses in him admiration for her, which he believes also elevates his own image. From then on, he decides to display her beauty publicly, hoping to gain admiration and recognition. He takes photographs of her in increasingly provocative poses that gradually became pornographic. He first shares the images with his friend and colleague Cavalmoretti and in a moment of madness, to all the other members of the orchestra. Eventually, in a crescendo of exhibitionism, she playfully encourages him to photograph her nude in sensual poses, such as the screenshot below. Eventually, he exposes her completely nude (by an apparent accident with her dress) in front of everyone at the Verona's Arena during the showing of Aida. Niccolò ends up in a mental institution.

== Cast ==
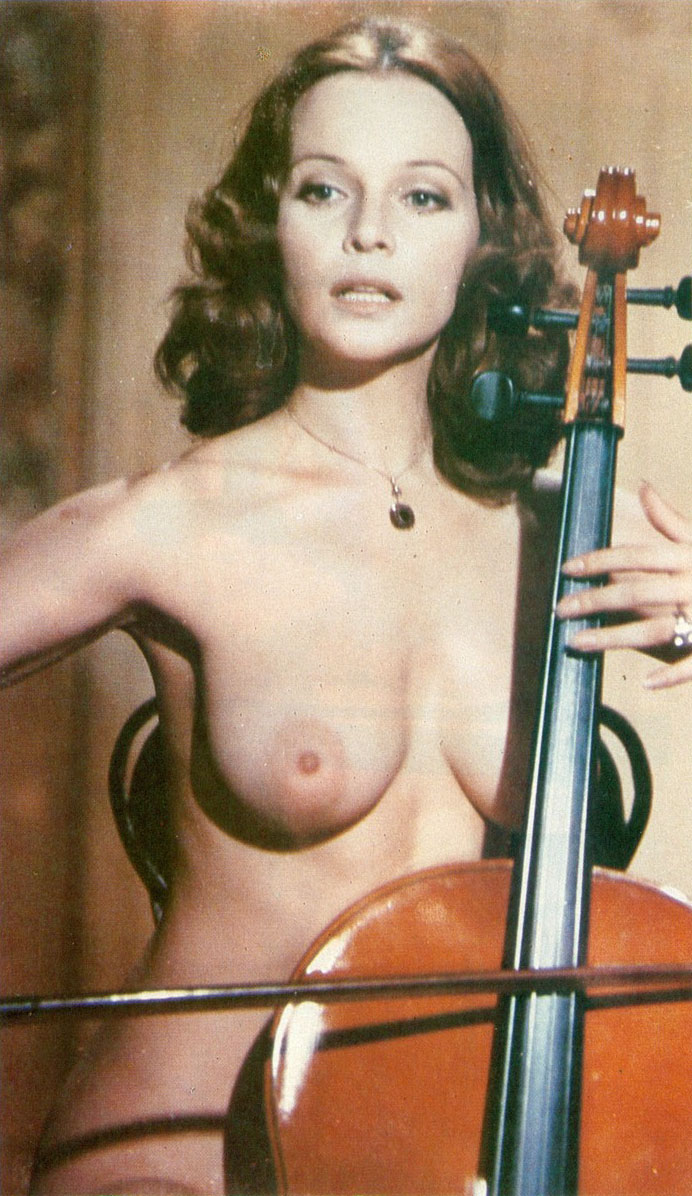
Laura Antonelli in a still from the film

- Laura Antonelli as Costanza Vivaldi
- Lando Buzzanca as Niccolò Vivaldi
- Gianrico Tedeschi as the Orchestra conductor
- Lino Toffolo as Cavalmoretti
- Luciano Bianciardi as Mazzacurati
- Gino Cavalieri as Costanza's father
- Elsa Vazzoler as Costanza's mother
- Ferruccio De Ceresa as the Psychoanalyst
- Aldo Puglisi as the Pharmacist
- Pietro Tordi as the Doctor

== Reception ==
A contemporary review found the film bizarre.

== Analysis ==
The film was shot in Verona, and it shows many situations in the environment of practicing symphonic orchestras that at certain moment of the year are allowed to play in Arena. Il Merlo Maschio represents the Commedia all'italiana.

Unlike most Italian comedy films in that epoch, always repeating the storyboards of the first erotic dreams of the symbolic teenager Pierino, or the arousal reactions of secluded soldiers that watch for the first time the shapes of a beauty queen (Gloria Guida, etc.), The Male Blackbird is also a light and discrete sociological presentation of the theme of candaulism.
