= Culo e camicia =

1981 Italian comedy film

- Directed by: Pasquale Festa Campanile
- Produced by: Luigi & Aurelio De Laurentiis
- Cinematography: Giancarlo Ferrando; Giuseppe Ruzzolini
- Music by: Detto Mariano
- Release date: 1981

Culo e camicia is a 1981 Italian comedy film directed by Pasquale Festa Campanile, consisting in two segments, respectively starred by Enrico Montesano and Renato Pozzetto.

== Cast ==
Il televeggente

- Enrico Montesano as Rick Antuono
- Daniela Poggi as Ornella
- Gianni Agus as director Annibale Panebianco
- Gino Pernice as Carletto Benedetti
- Umberto Zuanelli as Orfeo Canevari aka Geppetto
- Ennio Antonelli as salumiere

Un uomo, un uomo e... Evviva una donna!

- Renato Pozzetto as Renato
- Leopoldo Mastelloni as Alberto Maria
- Maria Rosaria Omaggio as Ella
- Carlo Bagno as father of Renato
- Carla Monti as mother of Renato
