= Riz Ortolani =

Italian composer (1926–2014)

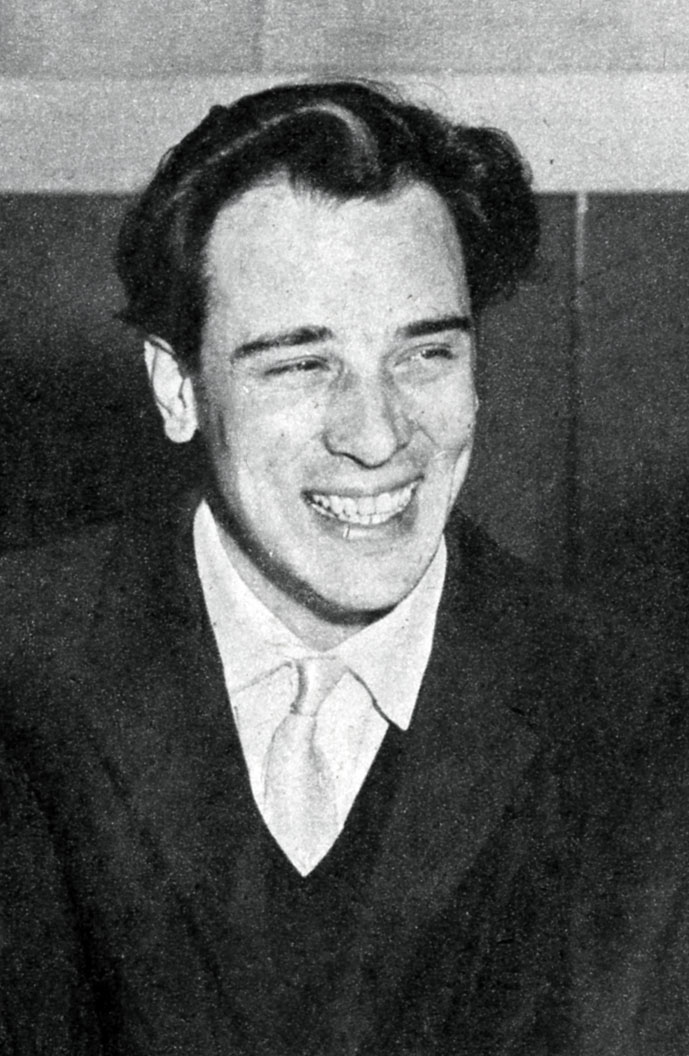
- Ortolani in 1955

Background information
- Born: Riziero Ortolani; 25 March 1926; Pesaro, Kingdom of Italy
- Died: 23 January 2014 (aged 87) Rome, Italy
- Occupations: Composer, conductor, orchestrator
- Website: www.rizortolani.com

Riziero "Riz" Ortolani (Italian pronunciation: [ritˈtsjɛːro ˈritts ortoˈlaːni]; 25 March 1926 – 23 January 2014) was an Italian composer, conductor, and orchestrator, predominantly of film scores. He scored over 200 films and television programs between 1955 and 2014, with a career spanning over fifty years.

Internationally, he is best known for his genre scores, notably his music for mondo, giallo, horror, and Spaghetti Western films. His most famous composition is "More," which he wrote for the infamous film Mondo Cane. It won the 1964 Grammy Award for Best Instrumental Theme and was nominated for the Academy Award for Best Original Song at the 36th Academy Awards. The song was later covered by Frank Sinatra, Kai Winding, Andy Williams, Roy Orbison, and others.

Ortolani received many other accolades, including four David di Donatello Awards, three Nastro d'Argento Awards, and a Golden Globe Award for Best Original Song. In 2013, he received a Lifetime Achievement from the World Soundtrack Academy.

== Early life ==
Ortolani was born on 25 March 1926 in Pesaro, Italy. He was the youngest of six children. Ortolani's father, a postal worker, gave his son a violin at age four. Ortolani later switched to flute after injuring his elbow in a car accident. He studied at the Conservatorio Statale di Musica "Gioachino Rossini" in his hometown of Pesaro before moving to Rome in 1948 and finding work with the RAI orchestra. Though the chronology is unclear, he also likely served as a musician in the Italian Air Force orchestra, formed a Jazz ensemble, and came to the United States as a Jazz musician in Hollywood, all before scoring his first film.

Ortolani married Katyna Ranieri in 1956. The couple had one daughter, Rizia.

== Career ==
In the early 1950s, Ortolani was founder and member of a well-known Italian jazz band. One of his early film scores was for Paolo Cavara and Gualtiero Jacopetti's 1962 pseudo-documentary Mondo Cane, whose main title-song More earned him a Grammy and was also nominated for an Oscar as Best Song. The success of the soundtrack of Mondo Cane led Ortolani to score films in England and the United States such as The Yellow Rolls-Royce (1964), The Spy with a Cold Nose (1966), The Biggest Bundle of Them All (1968) and Buona Sera, Mrs. Campbell (1968). He also scored the 1972 film The Valachi Papers, directed by Terence Young and starring Charles Bronson.

Ortolani scored all or parts of over 200 films, including German westerns like Old Shatterhand (1964) and a long series of Italian giallos, Spaghetti Westerns, Eurospy films, Exploitation films and mondo films. These include Il Sorpasso (1962), Castle of Blood (1964), Africa Addio (1966), Day of Anger (1967), Anzio (1968), The McKenzie Break (1970), Say Hello to Yesterday (1970)The Hunting Party (1971), A Reason to Live, a Reason to Die (1972), Seven Blood-Stained Orchids (1972), The Fifth Musketeer (1979), From Hell to Victory (1979), the controversial Ruggero Deodato films Cannibal Holocaust (1980) and The House on the Edge of the Park (1980), and the first series of La piovra (1984). In later years he scored many films for Italian director Pupi Avati.

His music was used on soundtracks for Grand Theft Auto: London 1969 (1999), Kill Bill: Volume 1 (2003), Kill Bill: Volume 2 (2004), Euphoria (2019) Drive (2011) Inglourious Basterds (2009) and Django Unchained (2012).

In 2013, he was awarded the Lifetime Achievement Award from the World Soundtrack Academy.

== Death ==
Ortolani died on 23 January 2014 in Rome, aged 87.

== Selected filmography ==
Year	Film	Directed by	Singles	Latest CD / Digital Release
1961	Ursus in the Valley of the Lions	Carlo Ludovico Bragaglia		Digitmovies / CDDM209 / 2012
1962	Mondo Cane	Paolo Cavara, Franco Prosperi, Gualtiero Jacopetti		CAM Sugar / 2021
1962	Il Sorpasso	Dino Risi		Milan / 399 552-2 / 2014
1962	Flying Clipper	Hermann Leitner, Rudolf Nussgruber		Avanz Records / SP/CR-20049 / 2009
1963	The Fall of Rome	Antonio Margheriti		
1963	The Virgin of Nuremberg	Antonio Margheriti		Quartet Records / QR231 / 2016
1963	Three Ruthless Ones	Joaquín Luis Romero Marchent		Beat Records / CDCR148 / 2023
1964	Castle of Blood	Antonio Margheriti, Sergio Corbucci		Digitmovies / CDDM242 / 2014
1964	Old Shatterhand	Hugo Fregonese		
1964	Brandy	José Luis Borau, Mario Caiano		
1964	The 7th Dawn	Lewis Gilbert		Film Score Monthly / FSM BOX 03 / 2008
1964	The Yellow Rolls-Royce	Anthony Asquith		Quartet Records / SCE061 / 2013
1964	The Naked Hours	Marco Vicario		CAM Sugar / Digital / 2022
1965	The Glory Guys	Arnold Laven		Film Score Monthly / FSM BOX 03 / 2008
1965	Red Dragon	Ernst Hofbauer		
1965	Berlin, Appointment for the Spies	Vittorio Sala		Saimel Bandas Sonoras / 3998911 / 2009
1966	Africa Addio	Gualtiero Jacopetti, Franco Prosperi	Melody / ARG 196: Africa Addio / Cape Town	Master Classics Records / 2011
1966	Lightning Bolt	Antonio Margheriti		
1966	Maya	John Berry		
1966	The Spy with a Cold Nose	Daniel Petrie		
1966	Make Love, Not War	Franco Rossi	CAM / AMP 13: Non Faccio La Guerra, Faccio L'Amore (3:50) / Don Getulio (2:21)	Digitmovies / DGST044 / 2019
1967	Requiescant	Carlo Lizzani		Beat Records / CDCR148 / 2023
1967	Woman Times Seven	Vittorio De Sica		Quartet Records / SCE061 / 2013
1967	Tiffany Memorandum	Sergio Grieco		Beat Records / CFS007 / 2023
1967	The Chastity Belt	Pasquale Festa Campanile	CAM / AMP 30: Le Notti Di Tobia / Tema D'Amore	Digitmovies / CDDM275 / 2014
1967	Day of Anger	Tonino Valerii		Quartet Records / QR626 / 2026
1968	The Biggest Bundle of Them All	Ken Annakin		Chapter III Records / CH 37503-2 / 2001
1968	Sardinia Kidnapped	Gianfranco Mingozzi		GDM / GDM 4313 / 2013
1968	Bandits in Milan	Carlo Lizzani		Quartet Records / QR627 / 2026
1968	Beyond the Law	Giorgio Stegani		GDM / GDM 2085 / 2007
1968	Anzio	Edward Dmytryk, Duilio Coletti		
1968	The Girl Who Couldn't Say No	Franco Brusati		GDM / GDM 4340 / 2014
1968	The Bliss of Mrs. Blossom	Joseph McGrath		
1968	Emma Hamilton	Christian-Jaque		GDM / CD CLUB 7077 / 2010
1968	Buona Sera, Mrs. Campbell	Melvin Frank		
1968	Dead Men Don't Count	Rafael Romero Marchent		
1968	The Last Roman	Robert Siodmak, Sergiu Nicolaescu/ Andrew Marton (2nd unit)		
1969	One on Top of the Other	Lucio Fulci		Beat Records Company / CDCR 134 / 2017
1969	So Sweet... So Perverse	Umberto Lenzi		Quartet Records / QR481 / 2022
1969	Night of the Serpent	Giulio Petroni		Digitmovies / CDDM145 / 2009
1969	Viva Cangaceiro	Giovanni Fago		Beat Records / CDCR148 / 2023
1970	Andrea Doria-74	Bruno Vailati		Quartet Records / QR385 / 2019
1970	The Unholy Four	Enzo Barboni		
1970	Invasion	Yves Allégret		Quartet Records / QR443 / 2021
1970	A Girl Called Jules	Tonino Valerii		GDM / GDM 4340 / 2014
1970	Un caso di coscienza	Giovanni Grimaldi		CF Soundtracks / CFS003 / 2019
1970	The Adventures of Gerard	Jerzy Skolimowski		
1970	Say Hello to Yesterday	Alvin Rakoff		
1970	The McKenzie Break	Lamont Johnson		
1970	Madron	Jerry Hopper		
1970	The Lovemakers	Giovanni Grimaldi		Digitmovies / CDDM266 / 2014
1971	Confessions of a Police Captain	Damiano Damiani		Quartet Records / QR566 / 2025
1971	The Hunting Party	Don Medford		
1971	Web of the Spider	Antonio Margheriti		Quartet Records / QR467 / 2021
1971	Goodbye Uncle Tom	Gualtiero Jacopetti, Franco Prosperi	RCA / SS-2160: Oh My Love (2:48) / Addio Zio Tom (2:32)	Quartet Records / QR564 / 2024
1971	Secret Fantasy	Pasquale Festa Campanile	CAM / AMP 93: Il Merlo Maschio (2:08) / Fotografie (3:06)	Digitmovies / CDDM266 / 2014
1971	The Statue	Rod Amateau		Quartet Records / QR205 / 2015
1972	Do Not Commit Adultery	Giulio Petroni		CF Soundtracks / CFS003 / 2019
1972	Seven Blood-Stained Orchids	Umberto Lenzi		
1972	The Dead Are Alive	Armando Crispino		Digitmovies / CDDM250 / 2014
1972	Shadows Unseen	Camillo Bazzoni		
1972	The Assassin of Rome	Damiano Damiani		
1972	Don't Torture a Duckling	Lucio Fulci		Beat Records / CDCR 134 / 2017
1972	A Reason to Live, a Reason to Die	Tonino Valerii		Digitmovies / CDDM293 / 2018
1972	The Valachi Papers	Terence Young		Quartet Records / QR627 / 2026
1972	Brother Sun, Sister Moon	Franco Zeffirelli		
1973	One Russian Summer	Antonio Calenda		
1973	Dear Parents	Enrico Maria Salerno		GDM / CD CLUB 7077 / 2010
1973	Seven Deaths in the Cat's Eye	Antonio Margheriti		
1973	Super Bitch	Massimo Dallamano	CAM / AMP 116: L'Intoccabile Mr. Cliff (3:26) / Love Break (1:55)	Chris' Soundtrack Corner / CSC 024 / 2018
1973	Hospitals: The White Mafia	Luigi Zampa	CAM / AMP 114: Mafia Bianca (2:55) / Joe 5 (2:41)	GDM / GDM 4313 / 2013
1973	No, the Case Is Happily Resolved	Vittorio Salerno		
1973	Counselor at Crime	Alberto de Martino		Chris' Soundtrack Corner / CSC 009 / 2011
1973	Contact	Giorgio Bontempi	CAM / AMP 123: Contact (2:26) / Fei Nye Mi (4:40)	Quartet Records / QR240 / 2016
1973	One Way	Jorge Darnell		Beat Records / BCM 9515 / 2012
1973	Teresa the Thief	Carlo Di Palma		
1973	Mean Frank and Crazy Tony	Michele Lupo		
1973	War Goddess	Terence Young	CineDisc / M-19: Una Ragione Per Vivre (3:38) / La Battaglia Delle Amazzoni (3:09)	Quartet Records / QRSCE029 / 2011
1974	There Is No 13	William Sachs	CAM / AMP 142: There Is No 13 (3:08) / 13th Floor (2:14)	
1975	How to Kill a Judge	Damiano Damiani		
1975	Mondo Candido	Gualtiero Jacopetti, Franco Prosperi	Seven Seas / FM-1087: Un Amore Cosi Tenero (3:05) / Mondo Candido (2:46)	Dagored / Red 113-2 / 2000
1975	Paolo Barca, Schoolteacher and Weekend Nudist	Flavio Mogherini		CAM / Digital / 2025
1975	Portrait of a Veiled Woman	Flaminio Bollini		Beat Records / BCM 9579 / 2017
1976	Submission	Salvatore Samperi		
1977	Death Steps in the Dark	Maurizio Pradeaux		
1977	Casanova & Co.	Franz Antel as Francois Legrand		
1977	I Am Afraid	Damiano Damiani		Quartet Records / QR627 / 2026
1977	The Pyjama Girl Case	Flavio Mogherini		Quartet Records / QR155 / 2014
1977	Sahara Cross	Tonino Valerii		Cinevox Records / CDOSTPK049 / 2025
1977	Double Murder	Steno		
1978	Red Rings of Fear	Alberto Negrin		
1978	First Love	Dino Risi		
1978	Gegè Bellavita	Pasquale Festa Campanile		Digitmovies / DGST046 / 2019
1978	Cyclone	René Cardona Jr.		
1978	Brutes and Savages	Arthur Davis		Quartet Records / QR527 / 2023
1979	Tigers in Lipstick	Luigi Zampa		
1979	The Fifth Musketeer	Ken Annakin		Quartet Records / QR268 / 2017
1979	Neapolitan Mystery	Sergio Corbucci		
1979	Mimi	Florestano Vancini		Digitmovies / DGST048 / 2019
1979	From Hell to Victory	Umberto Lenzi		Beat Records / CDCR 118 / 2012
1980	Cannibal Holocaust	Ruggero Deodato		Beat Records / DDJ 047 / 2019
1980	House on the Edge of the Park	Ruggero Deodato		Beat Records Company / BCM 9586 / 2020
1981	Madhouse	Luigi Zampa		
1981	Help Me Dream	Ovidio G. Assonitis		
1981	Fantasma d'amore	Dino Risi	WEA / PROMO 129: Phantom Of Love (2:38) / Unforgettable Love (3:16)	Quartet Records / QR241 / 2016
1981	Nessuno è perfetto	Pasquale Festa Campanile	aka Nobody's Perfect	Beat Records / DDJ059 / 2023
1982	Porca vacca	Pasquale Festa Campanile		Beat Records / CDCR064 / 2025
1982	The Girl from Trieste	Pasquale Festa Campanile		Beat Records / CDCR145 / 2021
1982	Valentina, Crónica del Alba (part 1)	Antonio José Betancor		Quartet Records / QR239 / 2016
1983	Zeder	Pupi Avati		GDM / 4334 / 2021
1983	1919, Crónica del Alba	Antonio José Betancor		Quartet Records / QR239 / 2016
1984	Warriors of the Year 2072	Lucio Fulci		Beat Records Company / BCM 9586 / 2020
1984	Tuareg – The Desert Warrior	Enzo G. Castellari		GDM / 4336 / 2014
1984	A Proper Scandal	Pasquale Festa Campanile		Cinevox / CD OST-PK 037 / 2018
1985	Miranda	Tinto Brass		
1986	The Inquiry	Damiano Damiani		Digitmovies / CDDM279 / 2016
1987	Capriccio	Tinto Brass		
1987	The Last Minute	Pupi Avati		
1989	Killer Crocodile	Fabrizio De Angelis		Kronos Records / KRONCD020 / 2013
1989	Massacre Play	Damiano Damiani		
1990	The Dark Sun	Damiano Damiani		Beat Records / BCM9614 / 2023
1991	Paprika	Tinto Brass		
1992	Angel with a Gun	Damiano Damiani		Beat Records / BCM9614 / 2023
1993	Magnificat	Pupi Avati		GDM / GDM 4338 / 2014
1994	The Voyeur	Tinto Brass		
1994	Nefertiti, figlia del sole	Guy Gilles		
1999	Midsummer Night's Dance	Pupi Avati		
2007	The Hideout	Pupi Avati		
2010	A Second Childhood	Pupi Avati		
