= Adriana Russo =

Italian actress and television personality

- Born: 4 February 1954 (age 72); Rome, Italy
- Occupation: Actress

Adriana Russo (born 4 February 1954) is an Italian actress and television personality.

== Life and career ==
Born in Rome, Russo started acting at the university, then she joined the stage company "Teatro insieme Emilia Romagna". In the second half of the 1970s, she entered the cabaret company "Il Bagaglino" and had her first film roles, notably appearing in Ettore Scola's Down and Dirty. After working on stage with Vittorio Gassman, her career was launched by the RAI variety show La Sberla. Russo then appeared in several dozens of films, stage works and TV-series; she was also playmate in the Italian edition of Playboy. She had a several-years-long relationship with the television presenter Pippo Baudo.
