= Massimo Franciosa =

Italian screenwriter

- Born: 23 July 1924; Rome, Italy
- Died: 30 March 1998 (aged 73); Rome, Italy
- Occupations: Screenwriter; Film director
- Years active: 1955-1991

Massimo Franciosa (23 July 1924 – 30 March 1998) was an Italian screenwriter and film director. He wrote for more than 70 films between 1955 and 1991. He also directed nine films between 1963 and 1971. He was nominated for an Oscar for Best Screenplay for The Four Days of Naples in 1964.

== Selected filmography ==
- Wild Love (1955)
- Poor, But Handsome (1957)
- Ladro lui, ladra lei (1958)
- Everyone's in Love (1959)
- Ferdinando I, re di Napoli (1959)
- The Magistrate (1959)
- The Assassin (1961)
- Smog (1962)
- La bellezza di Ippolita (1962)
- The Four Days of Naples (1962)
- The Leopard (1963)
- White Voices (1964)
- Three Nights of Love (1964)
- El Greco (1966)
- Last Moments (1974)
- The Voyage (1974)
- I'm Photogenic (1980)
