= Gigi e Andrea =

Italian comedy duo

Gigi Sammarchi (Bologna, 2 November 1949) and Andrea Roncato (San Lazzaro di Savena, 7 March 1947) are an Italian former comedy duo who worked on stage, films and television as Gigi e Andrea.

== History ==
The couple started performing together in small theaters, cabarets and hostelries in Bologna in the second half of the 1970s.

They debuted in 1978 on the Rai 1 variety show Io e la Befana.

In the 1980s, the couple starred and co-starred in several comedy films which were usually badly received by critics but of commercial success. The same period, their presence on the small screen also became more intense, especially on Fininvest variety shows and television films.

In the 1990s, having reached a more than respectable success, the couple split in order to pursue solo projects.

== Filmography ==
=== Films ===
- 1980 - Qua la mano, directed by Pasquale Festa Campanile
- 1982 - I camionisti, directed by Flavio Mogherini
- 1983 - Acapulco, prima spiaggia... a sinistra, directed by Sergio Martino
- 1984 - Se tutto va bene siamo rovinati, directed by Sergio Martino
- 1984 - L'allenatore nel pallone, directed by Sergio Martino
- 1985 - Mezzo destro, mezzo sinistro, directed by Sergio Martino
- 1985 - I pompieri, directed by Neri Parenti
- 1987 - Il lupo di mare, directed by Maurizio Lucidi
- 1987 - Rimini Rimini, directed by Sergio Corbucci
- 1987 - Tango blu, directed by Alberto Bevilacqua

=== Television ===
- 1986 - Doppio misto
- 1987 - 1989 - Don Tonino

=== Television shows ===
- 1978 - Io e la Befana
- 1978 - 1979 - Domenica in
- 1980 - C'era due volte
- 1981 - Tutto compreso
- 1981 - Hello Goggi
- 1983 - Premiatissima
- 1984 - Risatissima
- 1985 - Supersanremo 1985
- 1986 - Grand Hotel
- 1987 - Festival
- 1989 - 1990 - Sabato al circo
- 1990 - Bellissime
- 1990 - Risate il Capodanno
- 1991 - Bellezze al bagno
- 1991 - Il ficcanaso
- 1992 - Luna di miele
- 1992 - Il TG delle vacanze
- 1993 - Risate di cuore
- 1993 - Ma mi faccia il piacere
- 1995 - Regalo di Natale

== Awards ==
- 2002 - Career award given to Gigi e Andrea at Festival del Cabaret by municipality of Martina Franca.
