= Maurizio Micheli =

Italian actor, comedian, and author

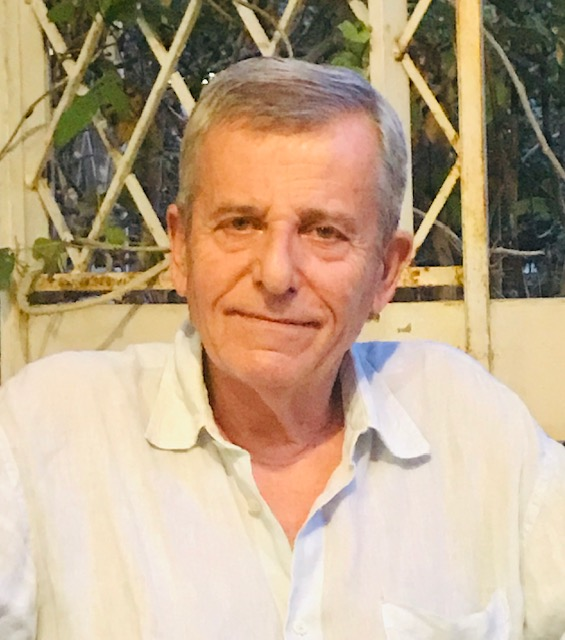
- Maurizio Micheli on 13 September 2020
- Born: 3 February 1947 (age 79); Livorno
- Occupations: Actor, comedian
- Height: 173 cm (5 ft 8 in)
- Spouse(s): Daniela Nobili; Benedicta Boccoli (from 2025)
- Children: Guido
- Awards: Officer of the Order of Merit of the Italian Republic

Maurizio Micheli Ufficiale OMRI (born 3 February 1947) is an Italian actor, voice actor, comedian, author, playwright and television personality.

== Life and career ==
Born in Livorno in 1947, at 11 Micheli moved to Bari with his family, then at 20 he moved to Milan where he attended and graduated at the School of Dramatic Art at the Piccolo Teatro. Between late seventies and eighties Micheli obtained a large popularity as a comedian, through a series of successful variety shows, including Fantastico, W le donne, Al Paradise and A tutto gag. Micheli was also very active on stage, while his film activity was less significant.

In 2002 he published the novel Garibaldi amore mio, by Baldini Castoldi Dalai, from which a comedy for 2003–2004 theatrical season was acted with the production of the Franco Parenti Theater in Milan. At Verdi Theater of Trieste) in 2007 he is La Gaffe in Il Paese dei Campanelli; during 2015 and 2016 he is engaged with Sabrina Ferilli and Pino Quartullo in the comedy Signori ... le paté de la maison, based on Le prénom (Dinner with friends) by Matthieu Delaporte and Alexandre De La Patellière.

=== Private life ===
He divorced from actress Daniela Nobili, with whom he had a son, Guido. Since 1998 he has a relationship with the actress and showgirl Benedicta Boccoli, that married on 28 August 2025.; He is an atheist.

== Selected filmography ==
- Allegro Non Troppo (1976)
- Café Express (1980)
- Mani di fata (1982)
- Heads I Win, Tails You Lose (1982)
- I Am an ESP (1985)
- Il commissario Lo Gatto (1987)
- Roba da ricchi (1987)
- Rimini Rimini (1987)
- Rimini Rimini - Un anno dopo (1988)
- Cucciolo (1998)
- Commediasexi (2006)
- Valzer (2007)
- The Cézanne Affair (2009)
- Ti stimo fratello (2012)
- Pinocchio (2012)
- Women Drive Me Crazy (2013)
- Quo Vado? (2016)
- I fratelli De Filippo (2021)

== Theatre ==
- (1974) Patria e mammà, written and directed
- (1975) Giovinezza addio!, written and directed
- (1975) Magic Modern Macbett, written and directed
- (1978) Mi voleva Strehler, written and directed
- (1979) C'era un sacco di gente soprattutto giovani, by Umberto Simonetta
- (1980) Né bello né dannato, written and directed
- (1981) L'opera dello sghignazzo, by Dario Fo
- (1984) Nudo e senza meta, written and directed
- (1985) Il contrabbasso, by Patrick Süskind, directed by Marco Risi, (presented at Festival dei Due Mondi)
- (1988) In America lo fanno da anni, written with Umberto Simonetta
- (1989) Romance Romance, directed by Luigi Squarzina
- (1991) L'ultimo degli amanti focosi, by Neil Simon
- (1992) Disposto a tutto, written with Enrico Vaime
- (1993) Cantando Cantando, with Benedicta Boccoli
- (1994) Buonanotte Bettina, by Garinei and Giovannini, directed by Gianni Fenzi con Benedicta Boccoli, Miranda Martino, Aldo Ralli
- (1996) Un paio d'ali, by Garinei and Giovannini, directed by Pietro Garinei, with Sabrina Ferilli, Maurizio Mattioli, Aurora Banfi
- (1998) Un mandarino per Teo, by Garinei and Giovannini, directed by Gino Landi, with Enzo Garinei Aurora Banfi, Vincenzo Crocitti
- (2000) Polvere di Stelle (adaptation by Maurizio Micheli of Polvere di stelle by Alberto Sordi), directed by Marco Mattolini, with Benedicta Boccoli
- (2001) Amphitryon by Plautus, directed by Michele Mirabella, with Benedicta Boccoli, Claudio Angelini, Matteo Micheli
- (2002) Le pillole d'Ercole, by Charles Maurice Hennequin and Paul Bilhaud, directed by Maurizio Nichetti with Benedicta Boccoli, Claudio Angelini
- (2004) Garibaldi amore mio, written and directed, directed by Michele Mirabella, with Claudio Angelini, Paola Lorenzoni, Anna Casalino
- (2005) La presidentessa, directed by Gigi Proietti, with Sabrina Ferilli
- (2007) Il contrabbasso, by Patrick Süskind, directed by Marco Risi
- (2007) Il letto ovale, by Ray Cooney and John Chapman, directed by Gino Landi, with Barbara D'Urso and (a year later) Maria Laura Baccarini
- (summer 2007) Il paese dei campanelli, directed Maurizio Nichetti
- (summer 2008) Cin Ci La, directed by Maurizio Nichetti
- (2009) Italiani si nasce e noi lo nacquimo, written with Tullio Solenghi, directed by Marcello Cotugno, with Fulvia Lorenzetti, Matteo Micheli
- (2012) George Dandin ou le Mari confondu, by Molière, directed by Alberto Gagnarli, with Benedicta Boccoli, Aldo Ralli, Matteo Micheli
- (2012) L'apparenza inganna, from Francis Veber, written and directed with Tullio Solenghi
- (2012) Anche nelle migliori famiglie, written by Maurizio Micheli, directed by Federico Vigorito, with Aldo Ralli, and from 2013 Paolo Gattini
- (2013-2015-2016) Signori... le paté de la maison, from Le Prénom by Matthieu DeLaporte and Alexandre De La Patellière, adapted by Carlo Buccirosso and Sabrina Ferilli, directed by Maurizio Micheli with Sabrina Ferilli, Pino Quartullo, Massimiliano Giovanetti, Claudia Federica Petrella, Liliana Oricchio.
- (2015) Un coperto in più, by Maurizio Costanzo, directed by Gianfelice Imparato, with Vito, Loredana Giordano, Alessia Fabiani.
- (2016-2017-2018) Uomo solo in fila, monologue written and directed by Maurizio Micheli
- (2017–2018) Il più brutto weekend della nostra vita, by Norm Foster, with Benedicta Boccoli, Nini Salerno, Antonella Elia, directed by Maurizio Micheli.
- (2019) Tempi nuovi, directed by Cristina Comencini, with Iaia Forte
- (2020) Su con la vita, directed by Maurizio Micheli, with Benedicta Boccoli, Nini Salerno, Nina Pons;
