= Andrea Roncato =

Italian actor, comedian and television personality

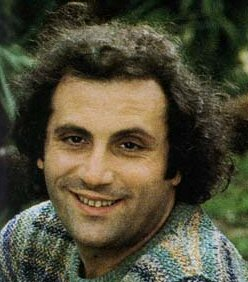

Andrea Roncato (born 7 March 1947) is an Italian actor, comedian and television personality.

== Biography ==
Andrea Roncato has a law degree from the University of Bologna and a solfège diploma from the Conservatorio Giovanni Battista Martini. He has attended several acting courses, both in Italy and in the United States.

His fame is mainly due to the comedy duo Gigi e Andrea with fellow comedian Gigi Sammarchi. After several television appearances they became one of the most famous duos of Italian cinema in the 1980s. They are known for their easy-going style and irreverence. Gigi e Andrea were spokespeople for Agip Petroli and Autobianchi Y10 4WD in the 1980s.

After gaining popularity with Sammarchi, Andrea Roncato continued his solo career starring in several films (including some Christmas comedies with Massimo Boldi and Christian De Sica) and in some television series.

From 2002 to 2008, he starred as Romanò in the television series Carabinieri on Canale 5 (seven seasons). In 2007, he was made a Knight of Malta. In 2008, he starred in the film Ho ammazzato Berlusconi and, in the same year, he had his first book, Ti avrei voluto, published by Excelsior 1881. The following year, he was a contestant in Ballando con le stelle, a reality show on Rai 1 (and the Italian version of Strictly Come Dancing).

In addition to his work as an actor, presenter, and voice actor, Roncato is also an acting teacher. He has served as an art director for several nightclubs and charity events. Roncato has actively promoted the "SOS Foca Monaca" campaign, supported a Fabriano initiative to raise awareness about responsible dog ownership, particularly the collection of dog waste, and has been named a global ambassador for the protection of disabled children. He is a great lover of animals, especially dogs, and has managed to create a special shelter for strays. He personally owns two, a setter named Padberg and a Czechoslovakian Wolfdog, Tullio.

=== Private life ===
In 1985, he had a two month affair with the pornography star Moana Pozzi, whom he met on the set of I pompieri.

In 1997, he married Stefania Orlando, a presenter and television actress, but the marriage ended in divorce after two years. Tabloid newspapers reported that his divorce was mainly due to his drug abuse.

He considers himself Roman Catholic.

== Selected filmography ==
=== Film ===
- Qua la mano, directed by Pasquale Festa Campanile (1980)
- I camionisti, directed by Flavio Mogherini (1982)
- Se tutto va bene siamo rovinati, directed by Sergio Martino (1983)
- Fantozzi subisce ancora, directed by Neri Parenti (1983)
- Acapulco, prima spiaggia... a sinistra, directed by Sergio Martino (1983)
- L'allenatore nel pallone, directed by Sergio Martino (1984)
- Mezzo destro mezzo sinistro - 2 calciatori senza pallone, directed by Sergio Martino (1985)
- I pompieri directed by Neri Parenti (1985)
- Rimini Rimini, directed by Sergio Corbucci (1986)
- Doppio misto, directed by Sergio Martino (1986)
- Tango blu, directed by Alberto Bevilacqua (1987)
- Rimini Rimini - Un anno dopo, directed by Bruno Corbucci and Giorgio Capitani (1987)
- Il lupo di mare, directed by Maurizio Lucidi (1987)
- Vacanze di Natale '90, directed by Enrico Oldoini (1990)
- Vacanze di Natale '91, directed by Enrico Oldoini (1991)
- Ne parliamo lunedì, directed by Luciano Odorisio (1990)
- Anni 90, directed by Enrico Oldoini (1992)
- Graffiante desiderio, directed by Sergio Martino (1993)
- Anni 90: Parte II, directed by Enrico Oldoini (1993)
- Gli inaffidabili, directed by Jerry Calà (1997)
- Simpatici & antipatici, directed by Christian De Sica (1998)
- T'amo e t'amerò, directed by Ninì Grassia (1999)
- Ricordati di me, directed by Gabriele Muccino (2003)
- Tosca e altre due, directed by Giorgio Ferrara (2003)
- L'allenatore nel pallone 2, directed by Sergio Martino (2008)
- Ho ammazzato Berlusconi, directed by Gian Luca Rossi (2008)
- Il cuore grande delle ragazze, directed by Pupi Avati (2011)
- Almeno tu nell'universo, directed by Andrea Biglione (2011)
- Napoletans, directed by Luigi Russo (2011)
- La corona spezzata, directed by Ruben Maria Soriquez (2013)
- Cornici di vita, directed by Giovanni Giordano (2015)
- Odissea nell'ospizio, directed by Jerry Calà (2019)
- Under the Riccione Sun, directed by YouNuts! (2020)
- Diabolik: Ginko Attacks!, directed by Manetti Bros. (2023)
- The American Garden, directed by Pupi Avati (2024)

=== Television ===
- Risatissima (1984)
- Grand Hotel (1985–1986)
- Don Tonino (1987–1989)
- L'odissea, directed by Beppe Recchia (1991)
- Il TG delle vacanze (1992)
- La voce del cuore, directed by Lodovico Gasparini (1995)
- Mamma, mi si è depresso papà, directed by Paolo Poeti (1996)
- La storia di Gigi 2, directed by Luca Mazzieri and Marco Mazzieri (1997)
- I misteri di Cascina Vianello, directed by Gianfrancesco Lazotti (1997)
- Ladri si diventa, directed by Fabio Luigi Lionello (1998)
- Via Zanardi, 33 (2001)
- Carabinieri, 7 seasons, directed by Raffaele Mertes, Sergio Martino, Giandomenico Trillo, Alessandro Cane (2002–2008)
- La palestra, directed by Pier Francesco Pingitore (2003)
- Crimini, directed by Antonio Manetti and Marco Manetti (2006)
- Il Capitano, directed by Vittorio Sindoni (2007)
- Così vanno le cose, directed by Francesco Bovino (2008)
- Un matrimonio, directed by Pupi Avati (2012)
- Il restauratore 2 (2014)
- Squadra mobile (2015)
- Provaci ancora prof! 6, directed by Luigi Di Blasi (2015)
- Don Matteo 10, directed by Monica Vullo (2016)
- Liberi tutti (2019)

== Books ==
- Roncato, Andrea (2008). Ti avrei voluto (in Italian). Milan: Excelsior 1881. ISBN 978-88-6158-085-5.

== Awards ==
- 1984 – Telegatto for Premiatissima
- 1985 – Telegatto for Miss World
- 1991 – Telegatto for Sabato al Circo
- 2002 – Career award given to Gigi e Andrea at Festival del Cabaret by municipality of Martina Franca.
- 2004 – Premio Walter Chiari, awarded during the exhibition of Il Sarchiapone in Cervia
- 2006 – Premio Speciale for the television series Carabinieri, awarded during the Festival di Villa Basilica in Lecce
- 2007 – Title of Knight of Malta
- 2008 – Premio Speciale Totò at the fourth edition of the Cabaret Festival in Pompeii
