= Brosio =

Brosio is an Italian surname. Notable people with the surname include:

- Manlio Brosio (1897–1980), Italian lawyer, diplomat, and politician
- Vanna Brosio (1943–2010), Italian singer, television personality, and journalist
