= Rimini Rimini - Un anno dopo =

1988 Italian comedy film

- Theatrical release poster
- Directed by: Bruno Corbucci
- Written by: Mario Amendola; Bruno Corbucci; Sergio Donati
- Starring: Corinne Cléry; Gianfranco D'Angelo; Eva Grimaldi; Maurizio Micheli; Renzo Montagnani; Gastone Moschin; Isabel Russinova; Adriano Pappalardo; Maria Rosaria Omaggio; Andrea Roncato
- Cinematography: Giuseppe Ruzzolini
- Edited by: Daniele Alabiso
- Music by: Franco Micalizzi
- Release date: 30 September 1988 (Italy)
- Running time: 110 minutes
- Language: Italian

Rimini Rimini - Un anno dopo is a 1988 Italian anthology comedy film directed by Bruno Corbucci. It is the sequel to the 1987 film Rimini Rimini.

== Plot summary ==
The film is divided into episodes set on the beaches of Rimini. A womanizer pretends to be a homosexual to win over a beautiful girl who ignores him. An elderly beach guy is suffering from indigestion. A loan shark finances, without knowing it, an extramarital adventure of his wife. Two southern spouses are forced, against all their principles, to an exchange of partners.

== Cast ==
- Corinne Cléry as Carla Formigoni
- Andrea Roncato as Paolo Polverosi
- Gianfranco D'Angelo as Alì
- Eva Grimaldi as Flaminia Longheroni
- Maurizio Micheli as Nicola Moschetti
- Renzo Montagnani as Luciano Ambrosi
- Maria Rosaria Omaggio as Immacolata Moschetti
- Gastone Moschin as Mr. Formigoni
- Adriano Pappalardo as Terry
- Isabel Russinova as Francesca
- Olimpia Di Nardo as Inge
- Enio Drovandi as Luciano's Friend
- Sabrina Ferilli as The Bar Cashier
- Enzo Garinei as Dr. Achilli
- Corrado Olmi as Flaminia's Husband
- Aldo Ralli as Nicola's friend
- Loredana Romito as The Girl in the shower
- Ettore Conti as The Bishop
- Armando Traverso as Giovanni

== Release ==
The film was released in Italy on September 30, 1988
