= Serena Grandi =

Italian actress (born 1958)

- Born: Serena Faggioli; 12 March 1958 (age 68); Bologna, Italy
- Occupation: Actress
- Years active: 1980–present

Serena Faggioli (born Bologna, 23 March 1958), known professionally as Serena Grandi, is an Italian actress, famous as a sex symbol in Italian cinema of the 1980s and 1990s. She was a popular pin-up model in Italy. During her film career, some films credited her as Vanessa Steiger, and she was notable in particular for two gory opuses, Antropophagus (1980) and Delirium (1987).

== Biography ==
Serena Grandi was born in Bologna, Italy. She graduated in computer programming and was first employed in a scientific analysis laboratory. She started her acting career in 1980, playing a supporting role in the comedy film La Compagna di viaggio by Ferdinando Baldi.

In the same year, Grandi played the role of Maggie in the controversial film Antropophagus, directed by Joe D'Amato. This film is well known among horror movie fans for its extreme gore sequences. After several minor roles, she took the title role in Tinto Brass' Miranda, which gave her the status of sex symbol in her native Italy and set the path for her stardom.

Through the 1980s, Grandi made nearly 20 films, mainly appearing in commedie sexy all'italiana and erotic films, but also starring in sword epics such as The Adventures of Hercules and in some horror films. In 1987 Lamberto Bava gave her the role of Gloria in his film Delirium. In 1991 she married the antiquarian Beppe Ercole, 20 years her senior, with whom she had a son Edoardo; the couple divorced in 1998.

In the 1990s, Grandi started to back away from the spotlight; during this time she focused her career on television series.

In 2003-2004 Grandi spent 157 days under house arrest, accused of having sold a few grams of cocaine. The case was later dismissed.

In 2006, Grandi was a candidate in the list of Social Action, a right-wing party led by Alessandra Mussolini, but she was not elected. The same year she published her first novel, L'amante del federale. In 2008, after a break of ten years, she returned to acting.

In 2017 Grandi competed in Grande Fratello VIP, the Italian adaptation of Celebrity Big Brother.

== Filmography ==
=== Films ===
Film roles showing year released, title, role played and notes
Year	Title	Role	Notes
1980	Mia moglie è una strega	Female passenger	Uncredited
1980	Tranquille donne di campagna	Aida	
1980	La compagna di viaggio	Teodoro's wife	Cameo appearance
1980	I'm Photogenic	Woman	Uncredited
1980	Antropophagus	Maggie	
1981	Teste di quoio	Nurse #1	Cameo appearance
1982	Pierino colpisce ancora	Rosina	
1982	Pierino la peste alla riscossa!	Waitress	Cameo appearance
1982	Malamore	Prostitute	Cameo appearance
1982	Sturmtruppen 2 - Tutti al fronte	Paesant	Uncredited
1983	Tu mi turbi	Guardian angel	
1983	Acapulco, prima spiaggia… a sinistra	Movie star	Cameo appearance
1984	A Boy and a Girl	Prostitute	Cameo appearance
1985	The Adventures of Hercules	Euryale	
1985	Miranda	Miranda	
1986	Desiring Julia	Julia Tassi	
1986	Lady of the Night	Simona	
1986	Les Exploits d'un jeune Don Juan	Ursula	
1987	Teresa	Teresa	
1987	Rimini Rimini	Lola Sarti/ Ramona	
1987	Delirium	Gioia	
1987	Roba da ricchi	Dora	Segment: "Primo episodio"
1989	L'insegnante di violoncello	Margherita Valle	
1990	In the Name of the Sovereign People	Rosetta	
1991	Per odio, per amore	Aida	
1992	Donne sottotetto (Centro storico)	Carola	
1992	Saint Tropez - Saint Tropez	Ada	
1993	Graffiante desiderio	Marcella Fabbri	
1994	Delitto passionale	Tania	
1995	La strana storia di Olga O	Olga Roli	
1997	Gli inaffidabili	Fioranna	
1998	Monella	Zaira	
1998	Radiofreccia	Freccia's mother	
2008	Giovanna's Father	Lella Ghia	
2008	Zoè	Mother	Short film
2010	Dopo quella notte	Ornella	
2010	A Second Childhood	Aunt Amabile	
2012	Due uomini, quattro donne e una mucca depressa	Ima	
2013	The Great Beauty	Lorena	Winner — Academy Award for Best International Feature Film
2019	Tutto liscio	Enrica	
2021	We Still Talk	Clementina	

=== Television ===
Television roles showing year released, title, role played and notes
Year	Title	Role	Notes
1985	Sogni e bisogni	Marisa	Episode: "L'imbiancone"
1986	Premiatissima	Herself/co-host	Variety show (season 5)
1988	Zanzibar	Valeria	Episode: "La Vedova"
1990	Vendetta: Secrets of a Mafia Bride	Addolorata Pertinace	Miniseries
1990	Paperissima Sprint	Herself/ Host	Comedy show (season 1)
1992	Piazza di Spagna	Margherita Morganti	Main role; 5 episodes
1995	Il prezzo della vita	Serena	Television film
1995	Pazza famiglia	Lisa	2 episodes
1997	Ladri si nasce	The Wife	Television film
1998	Le ragazze di Piazza di Spagna	Simona	2 episodes
1998	Anni '50	Maria	Miniseries
2004–2005	Il ristorante	Herself/ Contestant	Reality show (runner-up)
2008	Una madre	Salvatrice	Miniseries
2016–2021	Domenica Live	Herself/ Recurring guest	Talk show (seasons 5–9)
2016–2021	Pomeriggio Cinque	Herself/ Recurring guest	Talk show (seasons 9–15)
2017	Grande Fratello VIP	Herself/ Contestant	Reality show (season 2)
2018	Furore	Madame	Main role (season 2); 8 episodes
