= Delirium (1987 film) =

- Italian theatrical release poster
- Directed by: Lamberto Bava
- Screenplay by: Gianfranco Clerici; Daniele Stroppa
- Story by: Luciano Martino
- Produced by: Massimo Manasse; Marco Grillo Spina
- Starring: Serena Grandi; Daria Nicolodi; George Eastman; Sabrina Salerno; Capucine
- Cinematography: Gianlorenzo Battaglia
- Edited by: Mauro Bonanni
- Music by: Simon Boswell
- Release date: 3 April 1987 (Italy)
- Running time: 94 minutes
- Country: Italy
- Language: Italian

Delirium (Italian: Le foto di Gioia, lit. 'Photos of Gioia') is a 1987 Italian giallo film directed by Lamberto Bava and starring Serena Grandi, David Brandon, George Eastman and Daria Nicolodi. The film is about Gioia, the owner of the adult Pussycat magazine. She is harassed by a killer who sends her photos of her co-workers with her own erotic photography in the background.

The film was developed as a vehicle for Serena Grandi after the success of the film Miranda (1985). The film was shot in 10 weeks and released in April 1987 in Italy to negative critical and box office reaction.

== Plot ==
Gloria, a former model, runs a men's magazine, Pussycat, which she inherited from her late husband. One night, a killer in a blonde wig murders Gloria's friend Kim with a pitchfork outside Gloria's house. Her paraplegic neighbor Mark witnesses it and calls Gloria to alert her, but she finds nothing outside. The killer takes pictures of Kim's body in front of Gloria's modeling shots, send her the photos, which are found by her assistant, Evelyn. When Kim's body is found in a dumpster, copies of Pussycat start selling out because Kim was on the cover.

Gloria's brother Tony does a photoshoot for Pussycat with Sabrina Salerno. They try to have sex that night but Tony has impotency issues. After he leaves, the killer shows up in a beekeeper suit and releases bees which, attracted to Sabrina's perfume, proceed to sting her to death. The killer takes more pictures, sends them to Gloria, who recognizes the picture of her in the background. She confronts Roberto, the photographer, who tells her that the only negatives he had were stolen a while back.

Flora, an old acquaintance of Gloria's, attempts to buy Pussycat and Gloria eventually agrees to sell in the hopes that it will bring an end to the murders. Tony introduces Gloria to his new girlfriend Susan, and they scout out her department store for a photoshoot. They become separated and Gloria finds Tony's body on the escalator. The killer taunts her over the PA system. She escapes down the freight elevator, where she finds Susan's body. However, when the police arrive both the bodies have been removed. The killer sends Gloria some more photos, and later Evelyn finds Susan's dead body in her car.

The cops show up at Roberto's residence to question him and find the backdrops of Gloria. They call Gloria to warn her, right as Roberto shows up at her house. She runs from him, he chases after and gets hit by a car which kills him and then drives off. The cops conclude that he was the killer and consider the case closed.

Gloria sells the magazine to Flora and returns home to find out that Evelyn has quit the magazine. She then finds Tony's body floating in her swimming pool, and starts to put together the clues. The killer taunts her again, inside her home, and then pops up wearing the blonde wig and is revealed to be Tony. He explains his motive, that he committed these murders to protect and get closer to his sister. Mark sees Tony and Gloria from his room and shoots Tony in the groin with his rifle, seriously wounding him. Gloria is taken to the hospital to recover, and Mark brings her flowers.

== Cast ==
- Serena Grandi as Gloria
- Daria Nicolodi as Evelyn
- Vanni Corbellini as Tony
- David Brandon as Roberto
- George Eastman as Alex
- Katrine Michelsen as Kim
- Karl Zinny as Mark
- Lino Salemme as Inspector Corsi
- Sabrina Salerno as Herself
- Capucine as Flora

== Production ==
Delirium was envisioned as vehicle for Serena Grandi who has just appeared in the Tinto Brass film Miranda (1985).

The film had a 10-week filming time, which director Lamberto Bava reflected on saying it was one of the few films he had enough time and budget to get the results he desired for the film. In an interview, Bava suggested that after doing a few gialli back-to-back, he began to feel unenthusiastic about the genre, preferring more fantastical films like Demons. This led Bava to explore the notion of the killer's point of view in Delirium, which involved showing the killer's perception of his victims by giving them grotesque visual features. This ranges from one woman having a giant eyeball for a face while another has the appearance of a bee.

== Release ==
Delirium was released in Italy on 3 April 1987. A review in Variety noted that the film "produced little joy at the local boxoffice" while Italian critic and film historian Roberto Curti described it as a "critical and commercial failure at a time when Grandi's name drew crowds to the theatre." Bava later stated that he regretted having Grandi in the film who wrote in her contract that she "would barely show her tits". Curti noted that during this period, Grandi was trying to move away from her "sexy starlet image".

Delirium was released on DVD by Shriek Show/Media Blasters.

== Reception ==
A reviewer credited as "Yung." of Variety stated that Bava "keeps camera and action on the move, but without much result. Anontello Geleng's imaginative sets give pic an above-average look."
