= Camillo Milli =

Italian actor (1929–2022)

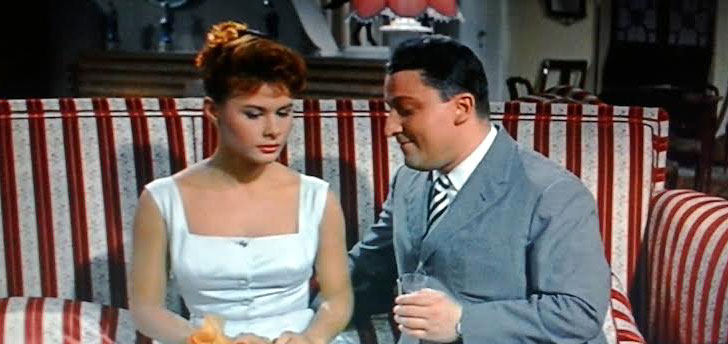
- Camillo Milli and Marisa Allasio in Girls of Today (1955)
- Born: 1 August 1929; Milan, Italy
- Died: 20 January 2022 (aged 92); Genoa, Italy
- Occupation: Actor
- Height: 1.70 m (5 ft 7 in)
- Spouse: Mariangela Migliori

Camillo Migliori, best known as Camillo Milli (1 August 1929 – 20 January 2022) was an Italian stage, film and television actor.

== Life and career ==
Born in Milan, Milli formed under Giorgio Strehler at the Piccolo Teatro di Milano, where he debuted in 1951 and where he was active until 1953. In the 1960s and in the 1970s he worked intensively with director Luigi Squarzina and at the Teatro Stabile in Genoa, specializing in the Carlo Goldoni repertoire. Milli was also active as a character actor in films, mainly cast in humorous roles, often as a sidekick of Paolo Villaggio. On television, he is best known for the role of Ugo Monti in the Canale 5 TV series CentoVetrine.

Milli died from COVID-19 complications on 20 January 2022, at the age of 92.

== Filmography ==
- Girls of Today (1955) - Vannucci
- The Doll That Took the Town (1956)
- Souvenirs d'Italie (1957) - The bespectacled Tourist into the Hostel in Venice
- A due passi dal confine (1961)
- Love in Four Dimensions (1964) - Porter of the railway station (segment "Amore e alfabeto")
- Le bambole (1965) - (uncredited)
- The Mattei Affair (1972) - Journalist
- We Want the Colonels (1973) - Col. Elpidio Aguzzo
- Il domestico (1974) - Prison director
- Goodnight, Ladies and Gentlemen (1976) - Captain La Pattuglia (uncredited)
- In the Name of the Pope King (1977) - Don Marino
- Io zombo, tu zombi, lei zomba (1979) - (uncredited)
- La locandiera (1980) - Carlo Goldoni
- Fantozzi contro tutti (1980) - Direttore Magistrale, Duca Conte Piermatteo Barambani
- Il Marchese del Grillo (1981) - Segretario del Papa
- Sogni mostruosamente proibiti (1982) - Direttore
- Fantozzi subisce ancora (1983) - Dottor Grandi
- Campo Europa (1984)
- Trainer on the Beach (1984) - Comm. Borlotti
- Rimini Rimini (1987) - Piedimonti-The doctor
- Casa mia, casa mia... (1988) - Cartier's Director
- I Won the New Year's Lottery (1989) - Cieco
- In the Name of the Sovereign People (1990)
- The Bankers of God: The Calvi Affair (2002) - Licio Gelli
- L'allenatore nel pallone 2 (2008) - Comm. Borlotti
- We Have a Pope (2011) - Cardinal Pescardona
- People Who Are Well (2014)
- Si accettano miracoli (2015) - Cardinale
- Ora non ricordo il nome (2016) - Himself (final film role)
