= Après La Classe =

Italian band

- Origin: Province of Lecce, Italy
- Genres: Ska, ska punk, reggae
- Years active: 1996–present
- Labels: Edel Italia, Sunny Cola, Puglia Sounds
- Members: Cesko Arcuti; Francois Recchia; Valerio "Combass" Bruno; Puccia
- Website: Official website

Après La Classe is a ska band from the Province of Lecce, Italy. The band is composed by six members: a singer, a guitarist, a bassist, a drummer, an organist and a disk-jockey.

== Band history ==
Formed in 1996, the band changed its line-up in 1999 and 2002 beginning to play in regional music events with the record label "Edel Italia". The debut album was "Après la Classe" (2002) with the disco and radio hit "Paris". This song was also selected in 2006 as theme song for national commercial and for TV program Le Iene. Their second album "Un numero" was released in 2004.

Linked to Salento traditional music, Après la Classe re-arranged and presented again classical songs like "Kalì Nifta", "Lu rusciu te lu mare", and famous Italian cover songs like Adriano Pappalardo's "Ricominciamo".

They played also with other Italian famous ska and reggae bands, such as Sud Sound System, and the rapper Caparezza. Their genres are pop, rock, ska and dance. The singer also sings in French.

In 2006 the album "Lunapark" was released for On the road music factory label, anticipated by a national tour.

They also took part in three editions of the Concerto del Primo Maggio in Rome (2007, 2008 and 2009).

The band was the protagonist of a pictures book, published in November 2009, and called "Il Ritmo Nel Tacco", with Sud Sound System, Raffaele Casarano and Cesare Dell'Anna. The preface author was Caparezza.

"Mammalitaliani", in collaboration of Caparezza, was released in summer 2010.

== Band members ==
- Cesko Arcuti - singer
- Francois Rekkia - drummer
- Valerio "Combass" Bruno - bassist
- Puccia - accordion

== Discography ==
=== Album ===
- 2002 - Après La Classe
- 2004 - Un numero
- 2006 - Lunapark
- 2008 - Lunapark on Tour
- 2010 - Mammalitaliani
- 2022 - Santa Marilena

=== Singles ===
- 1999 - Pazzo di te
- 2004 - Sale la febbre
- 2004 - A fiate
- 2008 - Il miracolo
- 2010 - Mammalitaliani
