= Giorgio Bracardi =

Italian actor, composer and stand-up comedian (1933–2026)

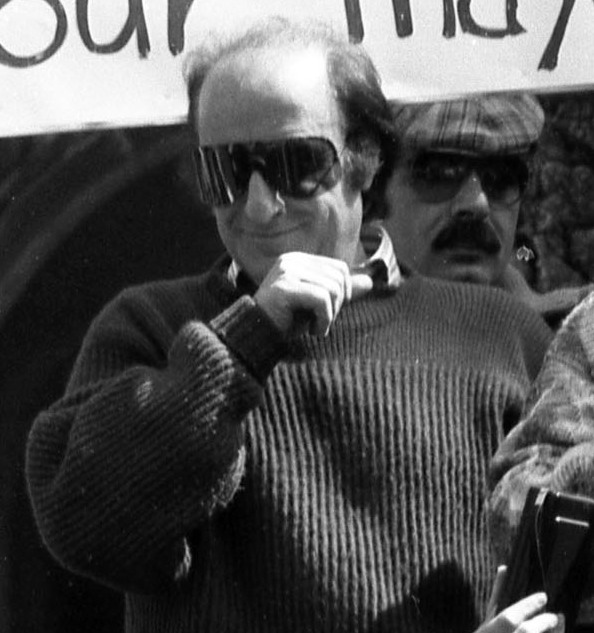
- Bracardi in 1986
- Born: 3 May 1933; Rome, Italy
- Died: 11 October 2026 (aged 93); Fiano Romano, Italy
- Resting place: Campo Verano
- Occupations: Actor; composer; comedian

Giorgio Bracardi (3 May 1933 – 11 October 2026) was an Italian actor, composer and stand-up comedian.

== Life and career ==
Bracardi was born in Rome on 3 May 1933 by Caesarean section. The older brother of the actor, pianist and composer Franco, Giorgio Bracardi worked around the world for many years as a piano player (accompanying, among others, Maurice Chevalier and José Feliciano) and performing as an entertainer.

He became famous in 1970, thanks to the radio variety show of Renzo Arbore and Gianni Boncompagni Alto gradimento ("High liking"), where he gave voice to some absurd and surreal characters such as Scarpantibus, Max Vinella, and the hierarch Catenacci. Later Bracardi created other grotesque and very original characters and appeared in numerous television shows. He starred in several feature films, in some cases even as the leading actor. In 2008 he dubbed Cattivik in the eponymous animated series broadcast by Mediaset. He also composed and occasionally sang several songs.

Bracardi died in a nursing home in Fiano Romano, where he had been staying for several months after breaking his femur, on 11 October 2026, at the age of 93.

== Selected filmography ==
- Patroclooo!..., directed by Mariano Laurenti (1973)
- Vinella e Don Pezzotta, directed by Mino Guerrini (1975)
- La portiera nuda, directed by Luigi Cozzi (1976)
- Being Twenty, directed by Fernando Di Leo (1978)
- La compagna di viaggio, directed by Ferdinando Baldi (1980)
- I carabbinieri, directed by Francesco Massaro (1981)
- I carabbimatti, directed by Giuliano Carnimeo (1981)
- Quando la coppia scoppia, directed by Steno (1981)
- I camionisti, directed by Flavio Mogherini (1982)
- La gorilla, directed by Romolo Guerrieri (1982)
- Banana Joe, directed by Steno (1982)
- Mi faccia causa, directed by Steno (1984)
