= Caffè Concerto =

London-based European style restaurant brand

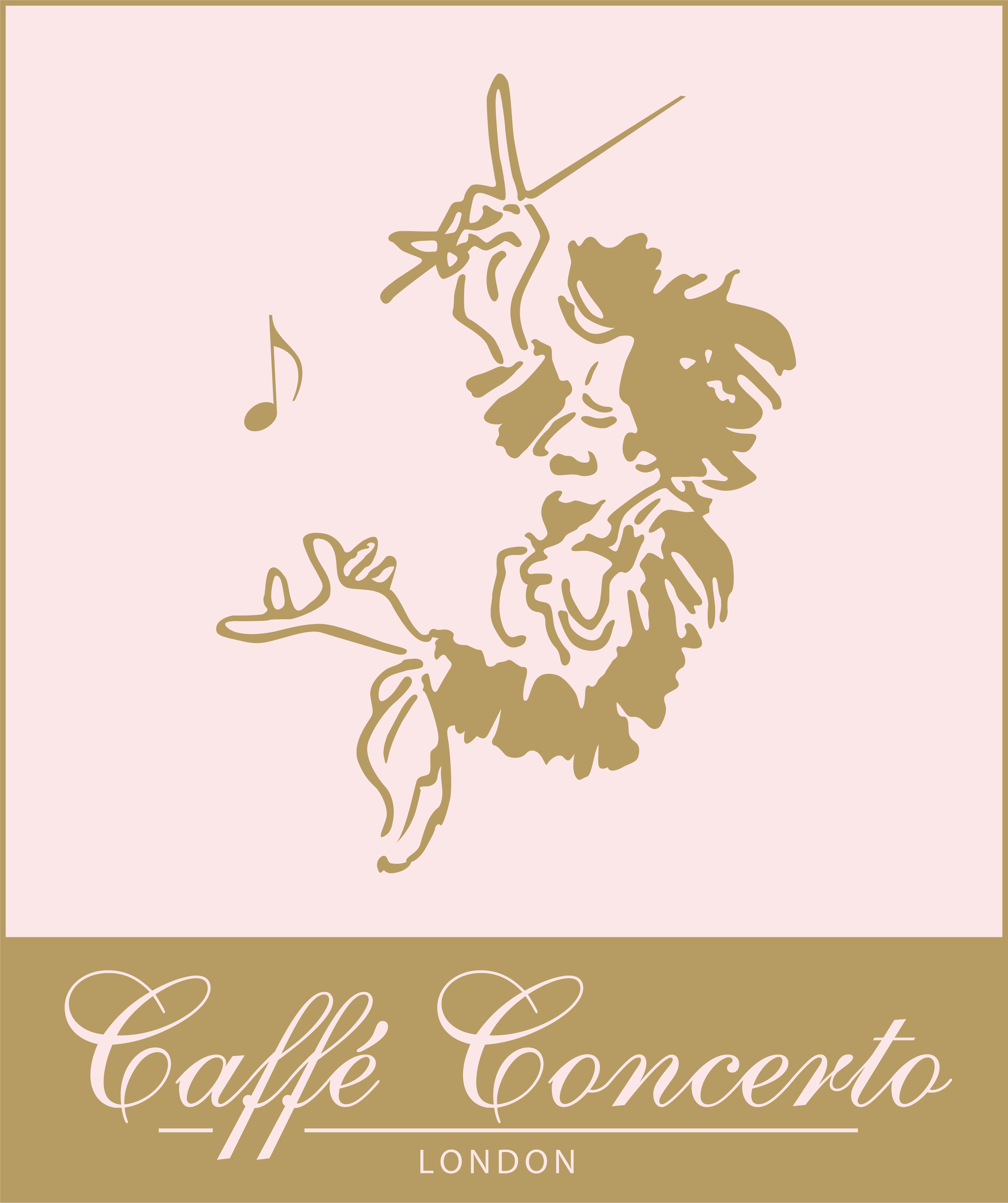
- Type: Italian Restaurant
- Industry: Hospitality
- Founded: 1996 in London, England
- Headquarters: London, England, UK
- Area served: UK, EU, KSA and Qatar
- Products: Italian cuisine, afternoon tea, wedding and celebration cakes, patisserie
- Services: Restaurant and patisserie
- Website: www.caffeconcerto.co.uk

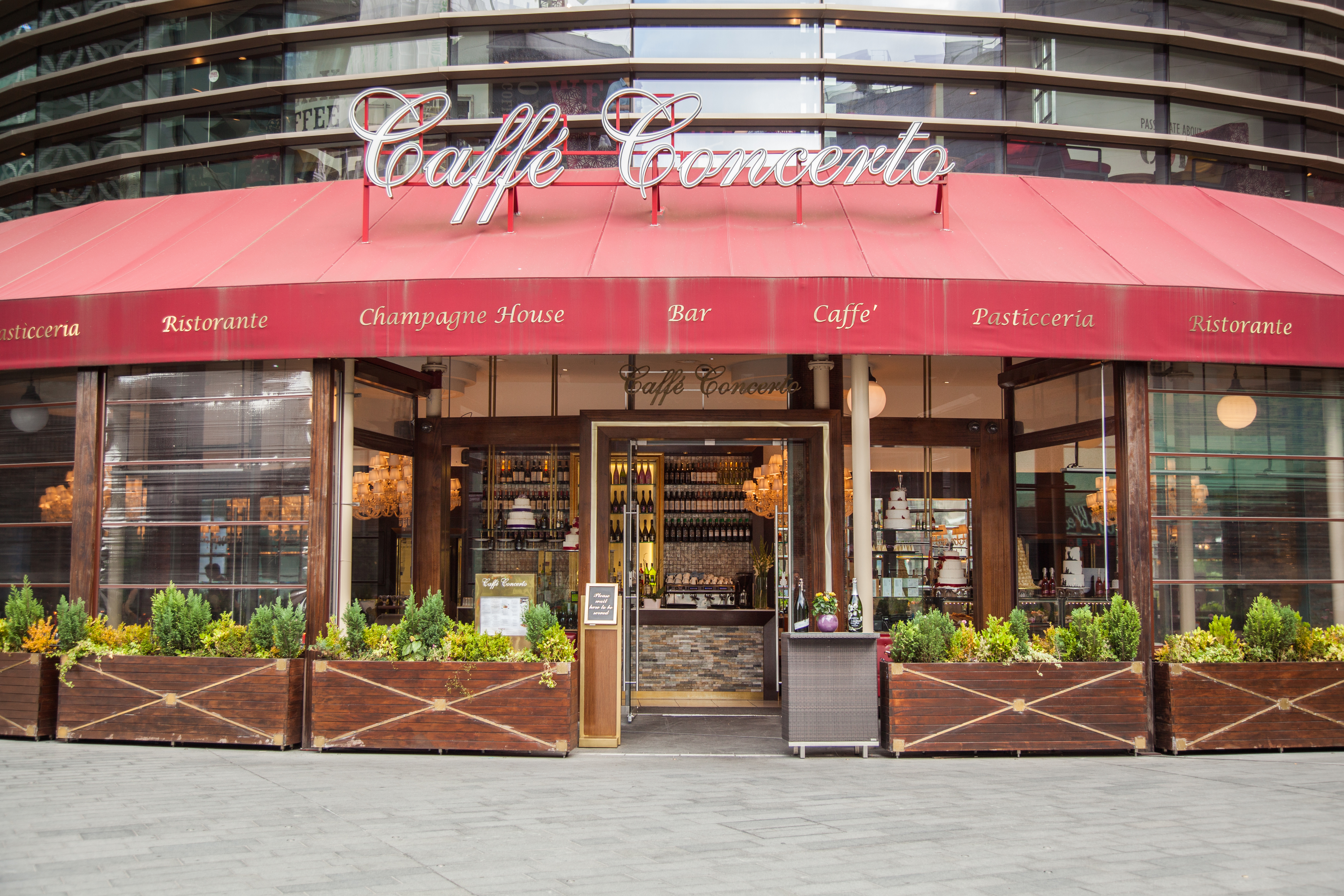
Caffè Concerto, The Street, Stratford, London, 2016

Caffè Concerto is a European style restaurant chain with its headquarters in London, England. It was founded in 1996, and the original branch was on Regent Street. As of 2022, the company runs 20 restaurants/cafes in the United Kingdom, including 19 restaurants in Greater London and one in Grand Central Station in Birmingham. In addition to its British chain, the firm is established in a number of countries including Saudi Arabia, Qatar, UAE and the most recent one in Paris. In 2013, Caffè Concerto was voted "fastest growing company" by Real Business Inside.

== Products ==
Caffè Concerto serves breakfast, lunch, dinner, and afternoon tea. It is known for its opulent window displays of wedding and celebration cakes, as well as live music events at its branches in Westfield and Mayfair.
