= Ricominciamo =

Single by Adriano Pappalardo
- B-side: "Hi-fi"
- Released: 1979
- Label: RCA Italiana
- Songwriter(s): Luigi Albertelli; Bruno Tavernese
- Producer(s): Celso Valli

Adriano Pappalardo singles chronology
"Voglio lei" (1978)	"Ricominciamo" (1979)	"Non mi lasciare mai" (1980)

Audio
- "Ricominciamo" on YouTube

"Ricominciamo" (lit. 'Let's start over') is a 1979 song composed by Luigi Albertelli and Bruno Tavernese and performed by Italian singer Adriano Pappalardo.

== Background ==
The signature song of Pappalardo, it marked his return to the hit parade after a six-year hiatus. The song is structured over the vocal characteristics of Pappalardo, in crescendo, with a low-key first part in which Pappalardo's voice is hushed and hoarse and a vocal explosion in the refrain.

The success of the song revamped in the second half of the 1990s, after "Ricominciamo" was chosen as closing theme of the comedy show Mai dire Gol and was performed by different singers, including the same Pappalardo, Roberto Vecchioni, Anna Oxa, Luca Barbarossa, Nilla Pizzi, Elio e le Storie Tese, Paola Turci, Piero Pelù and Mina. In 2003, the ska band Après La Classe recorded a reggae version of the song for their eponymous debut album.

== Track listing ==
No.	Title	Writer(s)	Length
1.	"Ricominciamo"	Luigi Albertelli, Bruno Tavernese	3:56
2.	"Hi-fi"	Adriano Pappalardo, Alvaro Guglielmi	4:19

== Charts ==
Chart (1979)	Peak position
Italy (Musica e dischi)	3
