= L'insegnante di violoncello =

1989 film by Lorenzo Onorati

- Poster
- Directed by: Lorenzo Onorati
- Starring: Serena Grandi; Michel Rocher; Leo Gullotta
- Release dates: 1983; 1987
- Language: Italian

L'insegnante di violoncello (lit. The Cello Teacher) is a 1989 commedia sexy all'italiana directed by Lorenzo Onorati (credited as Lawrence Weber) and starring Serena Grandi, Michel Rocher and Leo Gullotta. It has been considered the sixth and last film of the "Insegnante" series. The film was originally theatrically released in 1983/1987 as Abbronzatissima (lit. Very suntanned (feminine)).

== Plot ==
Mario falls in love with his cello teacher, the beautiful Margherita.

== Production ==
Roberto Pariante, a collaborator of Dario Argento, is credited as assistant director.

== Release ==
After its initial box office flop, the film was released directly on VHS under the title L'insegnante di violoncello in Italy on November 19, 1989. The versions that the Italian television broadcast were substantially shorter than the original (around 60 minutes), one VHS version lasting 19 minutes more.. The DVD version has been restored to 89 minutes while the integral version is said to last 95 minutes.

== Reception ==
The film is described as a "poor vacation comedy in the style of Carlo Vanzina, boring and predictable." A review on Filmtv.it concedes the film is not a memorable one but insists it cannot be judged in its truncated version.

== Bibliography ==
Paolo Mereghetti, Il Mereghetti: Le schede, Baldini & Castoldi, 2001, p. 1054.
