= The Plague (1992 film) =

- French theatrical release poster
- Directed by: Luis Puenzo
- Written by: Luis Puenzo; Robert Katz (narration)
- Based on: The Plague by Albert Camus
- Produced by: Christian Charret; Óscar Kramer; Jonathan Prince; John Randolph Pepper
- Starring: William Hurt; Sandrine Bonnaire; Robert Duvall; Raul Julia
- Cinematography: Félix Monti
- Edited by: Juan Carlos Macías
- Music by: Vangelis; Homero Manzi (song: "Ninguna")
- Production companies: Compagnie Française Cinématographique; The Pepper-Prince Ltd. Oscar Kramer S.A. Cinemania Films Group; Canal+
- Distributed by: Gaumont Distribution (France)
- Release date: 26 August 1992 (France)
- Running time: 148 minute
- Countries: Argentina; France; United Kingdom
- Language: English

The Plague (original title: La Peste) is a 1992 Argentine-French-British drama film written and directed by Luis Puenzo and starring William Hurt, Sandrine Bonnaire, Robert Duvall and Raul Julia. It is based on the novel La Peste by Albert Camus. It entered the competition at the 49th Venice International Film Festival.

== Plot ==
Set in the 1990s, 'The Plague' tells the story of Dr. Bernard Rieux. Unlike the book, which was set in the 1940s in Oran in French-occupied Algeria, the film takes place in the fictitious city of Oran in South America, where several cases of plague have been recorded. The authorities wanted to hide the disease from the population, but the news reached the citizenry. The city was quarantined and surrounded by the army, preventing anyone from getting in or out.

== Cast ==
- William Hurt as Dr. Bernard Rieux
- Sandrine Bonnaire as Martine Rambert
- Jean-Marc Barr as Jean Tarrou
- Robert Duvall as Joseph Grand
- Raul Julia as Cottard
- Jorge Luz as Old Man With The Cats
- Victoria Tennant as Alicia Rieux
- Atilio Veronelli as Dr. Horacio
- Francisco Cocuzza as Miguel
- Laura Palmucci as Miguel's Wife
- Norman Erlich as Dr. Castel
- Marcos Woinsky as Dr. Grunewald
- Duilio Marzio as Judge Orbon
- Pancho Ibáñez as Newscaster
- Horacio Fontova as Attendant
- Bruno Chmelik as Felipe, Judge Orbon's Son
- Monica Tozer as Dr. Rieux's Receptionist
- Lautaro Murúa as Father Paneloux
- Peter McFarlane as Hoese
- Lidia Catalano as Sara
- Fabiana Uria as Teresa
- Norman Briski as The Preacher
- China Zorrilla as Emma Rieux
- Juana Hidalgo as Mr. Castel
- Silvina Chediek as Newscaster
- Verónica Llinás as Stripteaser
