= Teresa (1987 film) =

- Directed by: Dino Risi
- Written by: Dino Risi; Bernardino Zapponi
- Starring: Serena Grandi; Luca Barbareschi
- Cinematography: Claudio Maioli
- Edited by: Alberto Gallitti
- Music by: Blasco Giurato
- Release date: 1987
- Language: Italian

Teresa is a 1987 Italian comedy film written and directed by Dino Risi, starring Serena Grandi and Luca Barbareschi. It tells the story of Teresa, an attractive young widow who works as a lorry driver to pay off her husband's debts.

== Plot ==
In the Italian province of Romagna, Teresa drives a lorry with her older husband Stallino, who dies. She discovers that he owed 80 million lire to Nabucco, a local entrepreneur, who now wants to marry her. She persuades Nabucco to let her work until Ferragosto next year when, if she has not earned enough to repay him, she will marry him. Having no affection for Nabucco, she takes whatever jobs she can get and as co-driver hires Gino, a happy-go-lucky young man to whom she is attracted. As he has no money and she must work, marriage is out of the question and their relationship is often stormy.

She collects a load of beer from a brewery in Germany where the owner, a baron, wants to marry her but Gino rescues her from this fate. She collects a load of fresh fish in Sicily, which is hijacked by the mafia and destroyed. Going to the mansion of the mafia boss to negotiate, he falls for her and offers two million lire compensation if she will be his mistress. When a gunfight then breaks out and he is killed, she pockets the cash and is rescued by Gino. After many other misadventures along the road, with or without Gino, in the end she finds that she will have to accept Nabucco. As she is about to say « I do » at the altar, she hears the horn of her lorry being hooted. Running out, she sees Gino at the wheel and the two ride off into the sunset, throwing her bridal garb piece by piece from the window.

== Cast ==
- Serena Grandi as Teresa
- Luca Barbareschi as Gino
- Eros Pagni as Nabucco
- Flora Carosello as Sepolcra, Teresa's mother
- Robert Stafford Burton as the baron
- Bobby Rhodes as Hermann, the baron's driver
- Pupo De Luca as the prior of the monastery
