= Ti stimo fratello =

- Theatrical release poster
- Directed by: Giovanni Vernia; Paolo Uzzi
- Screenplay by: Francesco Cenni; Giovanni Vernia; Michele Pellegrini; Paolo Uzzi
- Story by: Giovanni Vernia; Paolo Uzzi
- Produced by: Alessandro Usai; Maurizio Totti; Roberto Bosatra
- Starring: Giovanni Vernia; Maurizio Micheli
- Cinematography: Federico Masiero
- Edited by: Claudio Di Mauro
- Music by: Louis Siciliano; Giovanni Vernia; Marco Zangirolami,
- Production companies: Colorado Film; Bananas; Warner Bros. Entertainment Italia
- Distributed by: Warner Bros. Pictures
- Release date: 9 March 2012
- Running time: 93 minutes
- Country: Italy
- Language: Italian
- Box office: $2.7 million

Ti stimo fratello is a 2012 Italian comedy film written and directed by Giovanni Vernia and Paolo Uzzi.

== Plot ==
Jonny and Giovanni Vernia are twin brothers from Genoa, physically identical but very different in personality: Giovanni is intelligent, quiet, serious, and studious, graduating with honors in electronic engineering. Jonny, exuberant, naive, and dazed, is a real loose cannon, displaying an ignorance bordering on idiocy. His only preoccupations are discos and house music, since, as a newborn, a nurse accidentally dropped a Walkman with headphones playing the Bee Gees' "You Should Be Dancing" into his crib. Ever since they were children, while Giovanni diligently completed his homework, Jonny imitated his idol John Travolta's moves in Saturday Night Fever in front of the television.

Giovanni, who found it difficult to grow up with a brother like Jonny, moved to Milan immediately after graduation, wanting to build a professional career and escape the influence of his oppressive paternal aunt Vittoria and his father Michele, a marshal of the Guardia di Finanza (Italian Financial police), who always had a hand in important moments in Giovanni's life, often bribing others to help his son achieve his goals. Having settled in Milan, none of the companies he approaches are interested in hiring, and he finds himself forced to work as a photocopier technician. While performing a repair at an advertising agency, he meets the haughty and domineering Federica Ricci, sales director and daughter of the company's president, Roberto. He becomes engaged to Federica, who arranges for him to be hired by her father as an advertising executive. This job has absolutely nothing to do with his studies, but, combined with his engagement to her, allows him to settle down. Everything goes smoothly until one morning, Jonny unexpectedly drops by his brother and Federica's house. Thanks to his father's recommendation, the boy has passed the written exam to join the Guardia di Finanza and must take the subsequent oral exam in Milan.

Upon arriving in Milan, after causing trouble at Giovanni and Federica's house, Jonny sees a TV commercial featuring DJ Albertino for Gilez, a popular nightclub in the city, and begins frequenting the venue instead of studying. He quickly becomes a nightlife sensation, calling himself Jonny Groove, even gaining uninvited access thanks to three drag queens (one of whom is actually a childhood friend) and falling in love with Alice, a young waitress with whom Giovanni is also in love. Alice begins to reciprocate Giovanni's feelings, but only because she mistakes him for his wild brother, believing him to be one man leading a double life, which impresses her. Giovanni, realizing that she likes him precisely because of this misunderstanding, indulges her in this regard.

Although Jonny hasn't studied at all, his exam initially seems to go well, as he's being questioned by Marshal Di Prima, a friend of his father, who tries to pass him without asking him anything. However, shortly afterward, another police officer arrives and begins asking serious questions, so Jonny fails, provoking the ire of Marshal Vernia. To make matters worse, Jonny causes an explosion at the barracks (causing a series of scooters to fall, leaking fuel, and a cigarette thrown by a police officer falling onto them). However, Giovanni is charged and arrested for this crime, since his jacket containing his documents is found at the scene of the crime. Giovanni had lent it to his brother to make him look more presentable, and Jonny had thrown it in a bin before entering the barracks.

Giovanni is then briefly imprisoned, allowing him to attend an important business meeting with some American clients who want to hire the agency to advertise a truly disgusting pizza, which Giovanni hates. Federica, extremely late and not wanting to make a fool of herself, brings Jonny to the meeting (passing him off as his brother due to their physical resemblance). Jonny behaves stupidly, but his histrionics convince the Americans, and the deal goes through. A company party is then organized at Roberto's illegally built villa, also attended by the twins' father, who in the meantime has exonerated Giovanni thanks to his connections among the financial police, and Alice, who is there as a waitress. Federica, who has meanwhile realized that Giovanni is in love with Alice, publicly declares her desire to marry him; Giovanni, in response, confesses that he no longer loves her and prefers Alice.

That same evening Alice discovers that Jonny and Giovanni are actually two different people and instinctively kicks Giovanni for deceiving her, but then she realizes that she loves him anyway and decides to be with him.

The future holds very different destinies for the protagonists: Giovanni has a daughter with Alice, finally finds a job as an electronics engineer, and is offered a promotion to department manager, but loses the opportunity due to a misunderstanding (he mistakenly believes the HR manager's watch is one of the many his father gave him and destroys it, screaming that he wants to be appreciated for who he is); Federica becomes a steady partner with her Latin American dance teacher (an activity she had always tried unsuccessfully to get Giovanni involved in); the Vernia brothers' father has Federica's father arrested for tax evasion and illegal construction and has his company foreclosed and closed; Jonny, on the other hand, is the only one who hasn't changed his ways and is shown with his drag queen friends in Rome, gazing at the Colosseum, declaring that he finds it ugly and outdated and proposing to demolish it to build a nightclub in its place.

== Cast ==
- Giovanni Vernia as Jonny Groove/Giovanni Vernia
- Maurizio Micheli as Michele Vernia
- Susy Laude as Federica Ricci
- Stella Egitto as Alice
- Bebo Storti as Roberto Ricci
