= Sergio Donati =

Italian screenwriter (1933–2024)

- Born: 13 April 1933; Rome, Italy
- Died: 13 August 2024 (aged 91); Mentana, Italy
- Occupation: Screenwriter
- Years active: 1952–2008

Sergio Donati (13 April 1933 – 13 August 2024) was an Italian screenwriter. He wrote for more than 70 films beginning in 1952. He was born in Rome, Italy. He started as a writer and had some of his books optioned for film. He is well known for his collaboration with Italian director Sergio Leone, who encouraged him to take up screenwriting as a full-time career, and with Italian producer Dino de Laurentis.

What is film? In the first act, you hang a man up in a tree. In the second act, you throw stones at him. In the third act, he falls down. If he is alive, it is a comedy. If he is dead, it is a drama.

— Sergio Donati, from an interview

Donati died in Mentana on 13 August 2024, at the age of 91.

== Selected filmography ==
- The Enemy (1952)
- For a Few Dollars More (1965) (uncredited)
- The Big Gundown (1966)
- Dollars for a Fast Gun (1966)
- Requiem for a Secret Agent (1966)
- Col cuore in gola (1967)
- Mission Stardust (1967)
- A Handful of Heroes (1967)
- Face to Face (1967)
- Seven Times Seven (1968)
- Once Upon a Time in the West (1968)
- Rebus (1969)
- The Weekend Murders (1970)
- Duck, You Sucker! (1971)
- Stanza 17-17 palazzo delle tasse, ufficio imposte (1971)
- Ben and Charlie (1972)
- Slap the Monster on Page One (1972)
- They Believed He Was No Saint (1972)
- The Heroes (1973)
- Mean Frank and Crazy Tony (1973)
- Mr. Hercules Against Karate (1973)
- The Beast (1974)
- Policewoman (1974)
- Shoot First, Die Later (1974)
- The Boss and the Worker (1975)
- Cry, Onion! (1975)
- L'Italia s'è rotta (1976)
- Il mostro (1977)
- Orca (1977)
- Holocaust 2000 (1977)
- Tough to Kill (1978)
- A Dangerous Toy (1979)
- Island of the Fishmen (1979)
- Buddy Goes West (1981)
- Count Tacchia (1982)
- Bonnie and Clyde Italian Style (1983)
- A tu per tu (1984)
- Casablanca, Casablanca (1985)
- Raw Deal (1986)
- Man on Fire (1987)
- They Call Me Renegade (1987)
- Rimini Rimini - Un anno dopo (1988)
- Blowing Hot and Cold (1989)
- Voyage of Terror: The Achille Lauro Affair (1990)
- Beyond Justice (1992)
- North Star (1996)
- Almost Blue (2000)
- The Sicilian Girl (2008)
