= I camionisti =

1982 Italian film by Flavio Mogherini

- Directed by: Flavio Mogherini
- Written by: Gianfranco Clerici; Vincenzo Mannino; Flavio Mogherini
- Produced by: Renato Jaboni; Raimondo Vianello
- Starring: Gigi e Andrea; Daniela Poggi
- Cinematography: Raúl Pérez Cubero
- Edited by: Ruggero Mastroianni
- Music by: Riz Ortolani
- Release date: 1982
- Country: Italy
- Language: Italian

I camionisti (The Truckers) is a 1982 Italian comedy film directed by Flavio Mogherini and starred by the comedy duo Gigi e Andrea.

== Plot ==
Ofelia, the handsome operator of a service station, attracts the attentions of several admirers, including her former lover Rocky, a truck driver, and the noble Sir Archibald.

== Cast ==
- Andrea Roncato as Rocky
- Gigi Sammarchi as Rocky's Colleague
- Daniela Poggi as Ofelia Cecconi
- Francisco Cecilio as Sir Archibald
- Giorgio Bracardi as Driver of Sir Archibald
- Sergio Leonardi as Chiavica
- Toni Ucci

== See also ==
- List of Italian films of 1982
