= Paolo Barca, Schoolteacher and Weekend Nudist =

- Directed by: Flavio Mogherini
- Written by: Ugo Pirro; Francesco Massaro; Flavio Mogherini
- Starring: Renato Pozzetto
- Cinematography: Carlo Carlini
- Music by: Riz Ortolani
- Distributed by: Cineriz
- Release date: March 1975
- Running time: 110 minute
- Language: Italian

Paolo Barca, Schoolteacher and Weekend Nudist (Italian: Paolo Barca, maestro elementare, praticamente nudista) is a 1975 Italian comedy film directed by Flavio Mogherini.

== Cast ==
- Renato Pozzetto: Paolo Barca
- Magali Noël: Rosaria Cacchiò
- Janet Agren: Giulia Hamilton
- Stefano Satta Flores: Director
- Valeria Fabrizi: Miss Manzotti
- Miranda Martino: Assunta Calabrò
- Paola Borboni: Countess Felicita Barca
- Annabella Incontrera

== Release ==
The film was a big hit in Italy and had grossed $1.2 million from Italy's top 16 cities in its first month of release.
