= Miranda Martino =

Italian singer and actress (born 1933)

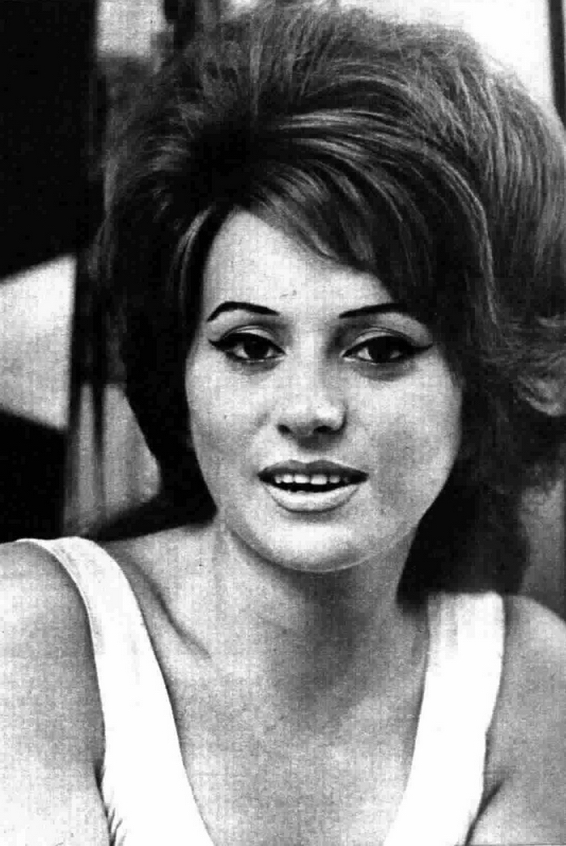
- Martino in Radiocorriere magazine, 1962
- Born: 29 October 1933 (age 92); Moggio Udinese, Kingdom of Italy
- Occupations: Singer; actress
- Relatives: Adriana Martino (sister)

Miranda Martino (born 29 October 1933) is an Italian singer and actress.

== Life and career ==
Born in Moggio Udinese from Neapolitan parents, Martino started her career as a singer in 1956. In 1957, she debuted at the Festival di Napoli and in 1959 she made her first appearance at the Sanremo Music Festival, with the song "La vita mi ha dato solo te". In the same year she obtained her first commercial success with the song "Stasera tornerò", which ranked 11 in the Italian Hit Parade. Then she entered the two following editions of the Festival di Sanremo and in 1961 three of her songs entered the Top Ten ("Erano nuvole", "Frenesia" and "Serenatella c'o sì e c'o no"). In 1963 she obtained a critical and commercial success with the album Napoli, in which she covered twelve canzoni napoletane re-arranged by Ennio Morricone. In 1965, she made her theatrical debut and from then she focused her career on stage acting and, less prolifically, on films.

== Discography ==
Albums

- 1958: Magic Moments At La Capannina di Franceschi
- 1959: 20 canzoni di Sanremo '59 (with Nilla Pizzi and Teddy Reno)
- 1959: Miranda Martino
- 1959: Napoli '59. Le 20 canzoni del festival (with Nilla Pizzi, Elio Mauro, Stella Dizzy and Teddy Reno)
- 1959: Il mio vero amore (EP)
- 1962: Miranda Martino
- 1963: Napoli
- 1964: Le canzoni di sempre
- 1966: Napoli volume II°
- 1967: Operetta primo amore
- 1970: Donna...Amore...Dolore (with Adriana Martino)
- 1971: Passione...
- 1977: Ottimo Stato
- 1977: La Valzerite
- 2000: Napoli mia bella Napoli

== Filmography ==
- La duchessa di Santa Lucia (Roberto Bianchi Montero, 1959)
- Avventura al motel (Renato Polselli, 1963)
- Canzoni in... bikini (Giuseppe Vari, 1963)
- Sedotti e bidonati (Giorgio Bianchi, 1964)
- Last Plane to Baalbek (Marcello Giannini & Hugo Fregonese, 1965)
- Addio mamma (Irving Jacobs, 1967)
- Paolo Barca, Schoolteacher and Weekend Nudist (Flavio Mogherini, 1975)
- Gegè Bellavita (Pasquale Festa Campanile, 1979)
- A Strange Passion (Jean-Pierre Dougnac, 1984)
- Red American (Alessandro D'Alatri, 1991)
- Dio c'è (Alfredo Arciero, 1998)
- Teste di cocco (Ugo Fabrizio Giordani, 1999)
