= Gigi Sammarchi =

Italian actor and comedian

- Born: Pierluigi Sammarchi; 2 November 1949 (age 77); Bologna, Italy
- Occupations: Actor, comedian
- Height: 1.77 m (5 ft 10 in)

Pierluigi Sammarchi (born 2 November 1949) is an Italian actor and comedian.

== Biography ==
He formed with friend Andrea Roncato the duo Gigi e Andrea, that became very popular in Italian television, appearing also in a number of successful 1980s comedy films such as Qua la mano (1980), I camionisti (1982), L'allenatore nel pallone (1984), I pompieri (1985) and Rimini Rimini (1987). In 1988, he starred as Commissioner Sangiorgi in the TV series Don Tonino.

After a 20-years hiatus, he returned to acting in the 2008 comedy Benvenuti in amore. In 2018 he guest starred in an episode of the crime series L'ispettore Coliandro.

== Filmography ==
=== Film ===
- Qua la mano (1980)
- I camionisti (1982)
- Acapulco, prima spiaggia... a sinistra (1983)
- Se tutto va bene siamo rovinati (1983)
- L'allenatore nel pallone (1984)
- Mezzo destro mezzo sinistro - 2 calciatori senza pallone (1985)
- I pompieri (1985)
- Doppio misto (1986)
- Tango blu (1987)
- Rimini Rimini (1987)
- Il lupo di mare (1987)
- Benvenuti in amore (2008)

=== TV series ===
- Don Tonino (1988)
- L'Odissea (1991)
- L'ispettore Coliandro (2018)
