= A tu per tu =

- Directed by: Sergio Corbucci
- Written by: Luciano Vincenzoni; Sergio Donati
- Starring: Paolo Villaggio, Johnny Dorelli, Marisa Laurito
- Cinematography: Carlo Alberto Cocchi
- Edited by: Ruggero Mastroianni
- Music by: La Bionda
- Production company: Adige Films s.r.l.
- Release date: 1984
- Running time: 110 minutes
- Country: Italy
- Language: Italian

A tu per tu is a 1984 Italian comedy film directed by Sergio Corbucci.

== Plot summary ==
In Milan, Emanuele is a rich owner who cheats finance; so he is hunted. As it happened while he is running away, Emanuele meets poor and bungling taxi driver Gino. Emanuele contrives all the ways to fool the shy Gino, and he puts the finances on his trail, while the other thinks for the future to have fun and continue to hide with his girlfriend. But Emanuele, when he discovers that Gino is really in trouble, decides to help him, and so he becomes a poor taxi driver, while Gino a rich and happy man: director of some properties in South Africa.

== Cast ==
- Paolo Villaggio as Gino Sciaccaluga
- Johnny Dorelli as Emanuele Sansoni/Enrichetta Sansoni
- Marisa Laurito as Elvira Sciaccaluga
- Adriano Pappalardo as the carabiniere
- Giuliana Calandra as Patrizia
- Franco Ressel as the notary
- Marilda Donà as lover of Emanuele
- Victoria Zinny as Solange
- Salvatore Borgese as Mafiosi leader
- Tracy Spencer as Tracy
- Lucio Rosato as Barzilai
- Moana Pozzi as blonde girl on the yacht
