= Trine Michelsen =

Danish actress (1966–2009)

- Born: 21 January 1966; Gentofte, Denmark
- Died: 17 January 2009 (aged 42); Emdrup, Denmark
- Occupation: Actress
- Years active: 1986–1999

Katrine Michelsen (21 January 1966 – 17 January 2009) was a Danish model and actress.

== Career ==
Michelsen's first role as an actress was a small role in Cyklen, a project film at the Danish film academy. Shortly after school she got a role in a TV play by Franz Ernst and Astrid Saalbach. In the play, she is a strong and politically committed woman. Later she became a nude model in Ekstra Bladet and Ugens Rapport.

This gave her roles in two horror films and two erotic films in Italy from 1986. In La Bonne by Salvatore Samperi, Trine Michelsen is a maid who arouses the inhabitants of a house erotically. The film was a success in Italy. The following year came Sergio Bergonzelli's Tentazione which was even more erotic. The same year she played opposite Donald Pleasence in the splatter film Spettri directed by Marcello Avallone. Her last Italian film was the 1987 thriller Le foto di Gioia by Lamberto Bava.

Her only American film came in 1988 in a small role in The Girl in a Swing, Gordon Hessler's adaptation of Richard Adams' novel by the same name. Lack of success made her focus on her modelling career, but she returned to acting in 1994 playing a prostitute in Vibeke Gad's unemployment drama Eva. In 1998 she was the most nude collectivist in Lars von Trier's Dogme-film The Idiots.

== Personal life ==
Michelsen was the daughter of journalist and author Ole Michelsen and his wife Nina Varberg, who died in a car accident four years after Trine's birth. She was without contact with her father for years until they were reconciled in the 1990s.

In April 2005, she stated publicly that she had cancer. In December, it had spread to most of her body. Michelsen died 17 January 2009 in a nursing home in Emdrup. She was buried at Frederiksberg Church.

== Film ==
- La Bonne (1986)
- Tentazione (1987)
- Spettri (1987)
- Le foto di Gioia (1987)
- The Girl on a Swing (1988)
- Trines fantasier (1994)
- The Idiots (1998)
- De ydmygede (1998)
- Antenneforeningen (1999)

=== Tv-series ===
- En verden der blegner (1984)
- Eva (1994)
