= Specters (film) =

- Directed by: Marcello Avallone
- Screenplay by: Marcello Avallone; Andrea Purgatori; Maurizio Tedesco; Dardano Sacchetti
- Story by: Marcello Avallone; Andrea Purgatori; Maurizio Tedesco
- Produced by: Maurizio Tedesco
- Starring: John Pepper; Katrine Michelsen; Donald Pleasence; Massimo De Rossi
- Cinematography: Silvano Ippoliti
- Edited by: Adriano Tagliavia
- Music by: Lele Marchitelli; Danilo Rea
- Production companies: Reteitalia S.p.A.; Trio Cinema e Televisione S.r.l.
- Distributed by: D.M.V.
- Release date: 7 May 1987 (Italy)
- Running time: 92 minutes
- Country: Italy

Specters (Italian: Spettri) is a 1987 Italian horror film directed by Marcello Avallone and starring Donald Pleasence.

== Plot ==
The film opens with an excavation for the Rome Metro collapsing a wall in a nearby archaeological site, exposing a previously undiscovered section of the ruins. This delights Professor Lasky, who has been leading an expedition at the ruins in search of the unidentified Tomb of Domitian. Excited, Lasky informs his team, made up of Barbara, Marcus, and Andrea, that legends claim that pagans used the site to perform human sacrifice in order to pacify an evil god. Marcus later shares news of the find with his actress girlfriend Alice, who is upset as Marcus regularly leaves dates early or cancels them entirely to spend time excavating.

Later Marcus travels through the new section of the ruins as his team watches him progress via handheld footage back at base camp. He discovers that to progress further he must undo a seal placed on the tomb, which Lasky urges him to break. As he breaks the seal a wind blows throughout the ruins and briefly disrupts the camera before everything returns to normal. The team attributes this to the ruins being sealed for so long and proceeds to set up a new base camp at the ruins. Soon after a strange supernatural presence, preceded by the same strong wind, begins to follow the archaeologists wherever they go. One of the teammates, Andrea, is killed by a largely unseen demonic presence, putting the teammembers on edge. Another, Barbara, is also slaughtered one evening while researching at the ruins.

The entity begins to also pursue Alice, culminating in it bringing her to its lair by pulling Alice through her mattress. Marcus is informed by Lasky, who was attacked and mortally wounded by the entity, that the ruins were meant to seal the demonic entity away forever. Because they unsealed the tomb, the entity was once again allowed to roam free and that Marcus must find a way to seal the demon away as well. Marcus goes into the ruins and locates Alice, however the two quickly find themselves lost. They are saved by the arrival of a blind catacomb guide, who was somehow aware that they were there and needed help. The entity slaughters the guide, however Marcus is able to blow up the ruins and flee with Alice. The couple decide to get married and go on their honeymoon, certain that the evil will never bother them again. This is proven false, as the film ends with a demonic hand reaching up through the mattress to terrorize them once more.

== Cast ==
- John R. Pepper as Marcus
- Trine Michelsen as Alice
- Donald Pleasence as Professor Lasky
- Massimo De Rossi as Matteo
- Riccardo De Torrebruna as Andrea
- Lavinia Grizi as Barbara
- Riccardo Parisio Perrotti as Gaspare
- Laurentina Guidotti as Maria
- Erna Schürer as Catacomb guide

== Production ==
Specters was the fourth feature film for director Marcello Avallone. His third film Cugine mie had been released a decade prior. Avallone decided to work in horror films when in the United States in 1980. Avallone began work on the project through the help of producer Maurizio Tedesco, the brother of actress Paola Tedesco, and began to develop a horror film aimed at foreign markets.

Avallone worked on the script with Andrea Purgatori, a reporter for Corriere della Sera newspaper. Despite his name being featured in the credits, Dardano Sacchetti's work on the film was small, with Sacchetti explaining that the writers really believed in the script but the financiers behind it were not as confident and hired him as a script doctor. Sacchetti and the rest of the writers discussed the film for a week but he later recollected that the other writers told him "We're paying you all your fee but leave us our movie." Of the film, Avallone has stated that he wanted the script to feature Italian history and that he did not intend for it to be a horror movie as would rather define it as "a movie about fear, and the borderline, populated with shadows, between Good and Evil."

Specters was shot in nine weeks and shot in English. Among the cast was John Pepper who had worked as an assistant director on films such as The World According to Garp (1982) and Ghostbusters (1984). Pepper was predominantly chosen for the role for his fluency in English, and this was his only leading acting role.

== Release ==
Specters was distributed theatrically in Italy by D.M.V. on 7 May 1987. It received a release in the United States on October 17, 1989.

== Reception ==
A reviewer credited as "Lor." of Variety at the Cannes Film Market on May 12, 1987. "Lor." found the film to be a "disappointing shaggy-dog Italian horror film" that was "technically okay but not delivering any scares and hardly any action until the finale." "Lor." concluded that the film "provides some nice travelling shots through the catacombs but pic is all buildup and no delivery."

In 1989, Michael J. Weldon observed that the plot was "inspired by the excellent Quatermass And The Pit" and that the monster was only "shown for about two seconds". He also commented, "There's a Nightmare on Elm St. bed scene rip-off, and one good part in an otherwise boring movie. Filmmakers are shown making a remake of The Creature From the Black Lagoon."

A reviewer for HorrorNews.net criticized the movie, stating that it was "a movie that I just can’t in good conscious recommend. There are some good moments here and there, and if you are a huge fan of Donald Pleasence then it’ll be good to watch once. Just don’t pay too much for it. The re-watch value is basically non-existent. Once is enough."
