= L'Italia s'è rotta =

1976 film

- Directed by: Steno
- Written by: Steno; Sergio Donati; Luciano Vincenzoni; Giulio Questi
- Cinematography: Aldo Tonti
- Edited by: Raimondo Crociani
- Music by: Enzo Jannacci
- Release date: 1976
- Language: Italian

L'Italia s'è rotta ("Italy is broken") is a 1976 Italian comedy film directed by Steno.

== Plot ==
The two Sicilian Peppe Truzzoliti and Antonio Mancuso decide, after a misadventure with some mafia drug dealers, to leave the cold and racist Turin to return to their native land. With them there is Domenica, a beautiful girl from Veneto, who had arrived in Turin in search of work but, for a number of setbacks, had been forced into prostitution.

== Cast ==
- Dalila Di Lazzaro: Domenica Chiaregato
- Mario Scarpetta: Antonio Mancuso
- Teo Teocoli: Peppe Truzzoliti
- Enrico Montesano: Roman robber
- Mario Carotenuto: Cavalier Amedeo Zerolli
- Alberto Lionello: Domenica's uncle
- Franca Valeri: Countess Giovanna
- Duilio Del Prete: Censor
- Orazio Orlando: Oronzo
- Clelia Matania: Peppe's mother
- Carla Calò: Antonio's mother
- Sergio Di Pinto: Zerolli's son
- Marisa Laurito: Rosalia
