= Terra Nova (1991 film) =

- Film poster
- Directed by: Calogero Salvo
- Written by: Marisa Bafile; Riccardo Manao; Calogero Salvo
- Produced by: Giuseppe Giovannini; Riccardo Manao; Calogero Salvo
- Starring: Marisa Laurito; Antonio Banderas; Mimí Lazo
- Cinematography: Giuseppe Tinelli
- Edited by: Mauro Bonanni
- Music by: José Vinicio Adames
- Release date: 1991
- Countries: Italy; Venezuela; France
- Language: English

Terra Nova is a 1991 film directed by Calogero Salvo and starring Marisa Laurito, Antonio Banderas and Mimí Lazo.

== Cast ==
- Mimi Lazo as Noemi
- Antonio Banderas as Antonio
- Johnathan Montenegro as Gaspare
- Aroldo Betancourt as Alfredo
- Marisa Laurito as Rosseta
- Patrick Bauchau as Mr Stal
- Rafael Briceño
- Adelaida Pitaliga as Maria Rita

== Filmong locations ==
The movie was shot in the Trujillo state in the early 1990.
