= Marisa Laurito =

Italian actress, singer, and television personality

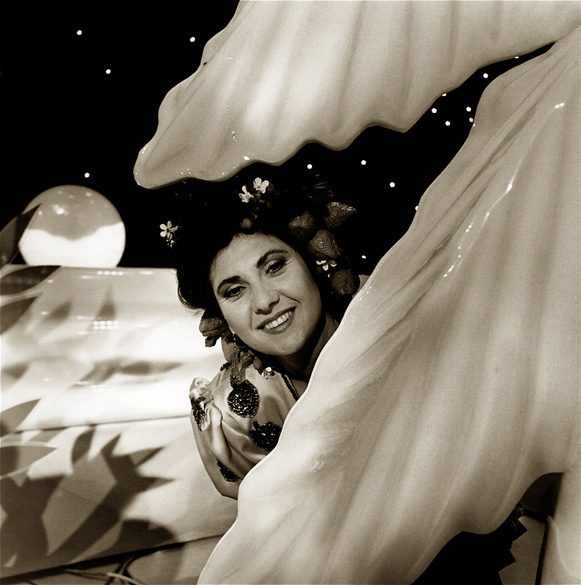
- Marisa Laurito in 1987, photographed by Augusto De Luca
- Born: 19 April 1951 (age 75); Naples, Italy
- Occupations: Actress; singer; television personality

Marisa Laurito (born 19 April 1951) is an Italian actress, singer and television personality.

== Life and career ==
Born in Naples, Italy, Laurito debuted at a very young age entering the stage company of Eduardo De Filippo. She obtained large popularity with Renzo Arbore's variety show Quelli della notte, and then went on to host several TV-programs, including two editions of the RAI Saturday night show Fantastico. In 1989, she entered the Sanremo Music Festival with the song "Il babà è una cosa seria", ranking twelfth. Laurito is also author of several cookbooks. She believes in one God but she does not follow any religion.

== Selected filmography ==
- Perdutamente tuo... mi firmo Macaluso Carmelo fu Giuseppe (1976)
- L'Italia s'è rotta (1976)
- The Payoff (1978)
- Gegè Bellavita (1978)
- Odds and Evens (1978)
- Café Express (1980)
- La pagella (1980)
- A tu per tu (1984)
- Il mistero di Bellavista (1985)
- Il tenente dei carabinieri (1986)
- Terra Nova (1991)
- W gli sposi (2019)
- I fratelli De Filippo (2021)
