= La Bonne =

1986 film by Salvatore Samperi

- Italian theatrical release poster
- Directed by: Salvatore Samperi
- Written by: Alessandro Capone; Luca D'Alisera; Riccardo Ghione; Salvatore Samperi
- Produced by: Faso Film (Rome); Producteurs Associés (Paris)
- Starring: Florence Guérin; Trine Michelsen; Cyrus Elias
- Cinematography: Camillo Bazzoni
- Edited by: Sergio Montanari
- Music by: Riz Ortolani
- Distributed by: CIDIF; Avo Film
- Release date: 1986
- Running time: 84 minutes
- Country: Italy
- Language: Italian

La Bonne (aka "Corruption") is a 1986 erotic romantic drama directed by Salvatore Samperi starring Florence Guerin and Trine Michelsen.

== Plot ==
The film takes place in Vicenza in 1956. Anna, a beautiful lawyer's wife, feels abandoned by her husband and grows closer to their maid, Angela. The maid convinces Anna to try increasingly daring erotic games.

== Cast ==
- Florence Guérin as Anna
- Trine Michelsen as Angela
- Cyrus Elias as Giacomo
- Silvio Anselmo as Mario
- Benito Artesi
- Ida Eccher
- Rita Savagnone
- Lorenzo Lena
- Clara Bertuzzo
- Antonia Cazzola
- Roberta Orlandi
- Antonella Ponziani
- Bruna Simionato

== See also ==
- List of Italian films of 1986

== Bibliography ==
- Cestaro, Gary P. (22 July 2004). Queer Italia: Same-Sex Desire in Italian Literature and Film. Springer, 2004. ISBN 9781403982599.
