= Roba da ricchi =

- Directed by: Sergio Corbucci
- Written by: Mario Amendola; Bruno Corbucci; Sergio Corbucci; Massimo Franciosa; Gianni Romoli; Bernardino Zapponi
- Starring: Lino Banfi; Laura Antonelli; Renato Pozzetto; Francesca Dellera; Serena Grandi; Paolo Villaggio
- Cinematography: Sergio D'Offizi
- Edited by: Ruggero Mastroianni
- Music by: La Bionda
- Release date: 1987
- Running time: 104 minutes
- Country: Italy
- Language: Italian

Roba da ricchi (Stuff for rich people) is a 1987 Italian anthology comedy film directed by Sergio Corbucci. It consists of three segments, all set in Monte Carlo.

== Plot ==
Against the backdrop of Monte Carlo (where the film was shot) three different stories intertwine:

I episode

Attilio Carbone, a clumsy insurer, after having recklessly insured a dog against the damage caused to it, in order not to be fired must be able to pay the owner the least possible compensation. However, he will be seduced by the busty Dora who will convince him to have her husband take out a large life insurance policy and then kill him and pocket the insurance money; the woman, who is also in league with her husband, will end up cheating both of them, pocketing the money and abandoning them on a desert island.

II episode

On advice from the family doctor, agree to arrange a meeting between the two. While he finds himself at the height of despair at the thought of his wife with each other, Mapi will make him believe that Napoleon is homosexual and that it was all a plan to punish him for constant flings. They will promise each other loyalty, but in reality Napoleon is neither gay nor a busker, and he is really Mapi's lover, who will even give him a yacht. Petruzzelli too, however, will continue with his escapades.

III episode

Don Vittorino, returning from a trip to Lourdes with some parishioners, is blocked in Monte Carlo, as he is the striking copy of the man who disturbs the dreams of Princess Topazia. Under pressure from her future husband, from the psychiatrist who is treating her, from a monsignor and from Pope John Paul II himself, he agrees to impersonate the man, in an attempt to reproduce the princess's recurring dream. The staging, albeit with various obstacles and misunderstandings, will come to fruition. Don Vittorino is also appointed spiritual advisor to the princess with the joyful approval of the new husband and the parents of both spouses, but in reality, for Topazia, it is just an excuse to have him as a lover.

== Cast ==
First segment

- Paolo Villaggio: Carbone
- Serena Grandi: Dora
- Maurizio Micheli: Guidobaldo
- Aldo Ralli: Director

Second segment

- Lino Banfi: Commendator Petruzzelli
- Laura Antonelli: Mapi
- Milena Vukotic: Doctor (Friend of Mapi)
- Maurizio Fabbri: Napoleon
- Claudia Gerini: Daughter of Petruzzelli

Third segment

- Renato Pozzetto: Don Vittorino
- Francesca Dellera: Princess Topazia
- Vittorio Caprioli: Bishop
- Enzo Garinei: Topazia's Psychiatrist

== See also ==
- List of Italian films of 1987
