= Florence Guérin =

French actress

- Born: 12 June 1965 (age 61); Nice, France
- Other name: Florence Nicolas
- Years active: 1980–present

Florence Guérin (born 12 June 1965) is a French actress. She appeared in film and in television roles between 1983 and 1990.

== Selected filmography ==
- 1983: Black Venus as Louise
- 1985: Le déclic as Claudia Christiani
- 1986: La Bonne as Anna
- 1986: Knife Under the Throat as Catherine Legrand
- 1987: D'Annunzio as Clo Albrini
- 1987: Montecarlo Gran Casinò as Sylvia
- 1987: Faceless as herself
- 1987: Bizarre as Laurie
- 1987: Top Model as Nadine
- 1988: Too Beautiful to Die as Melanie Roberts
- 1989: Il gatto nero as Anne Ravenna
- 2001: The Donor as Sylvia
