= Giuliana Calandra =

Italian actress (1936–2018)

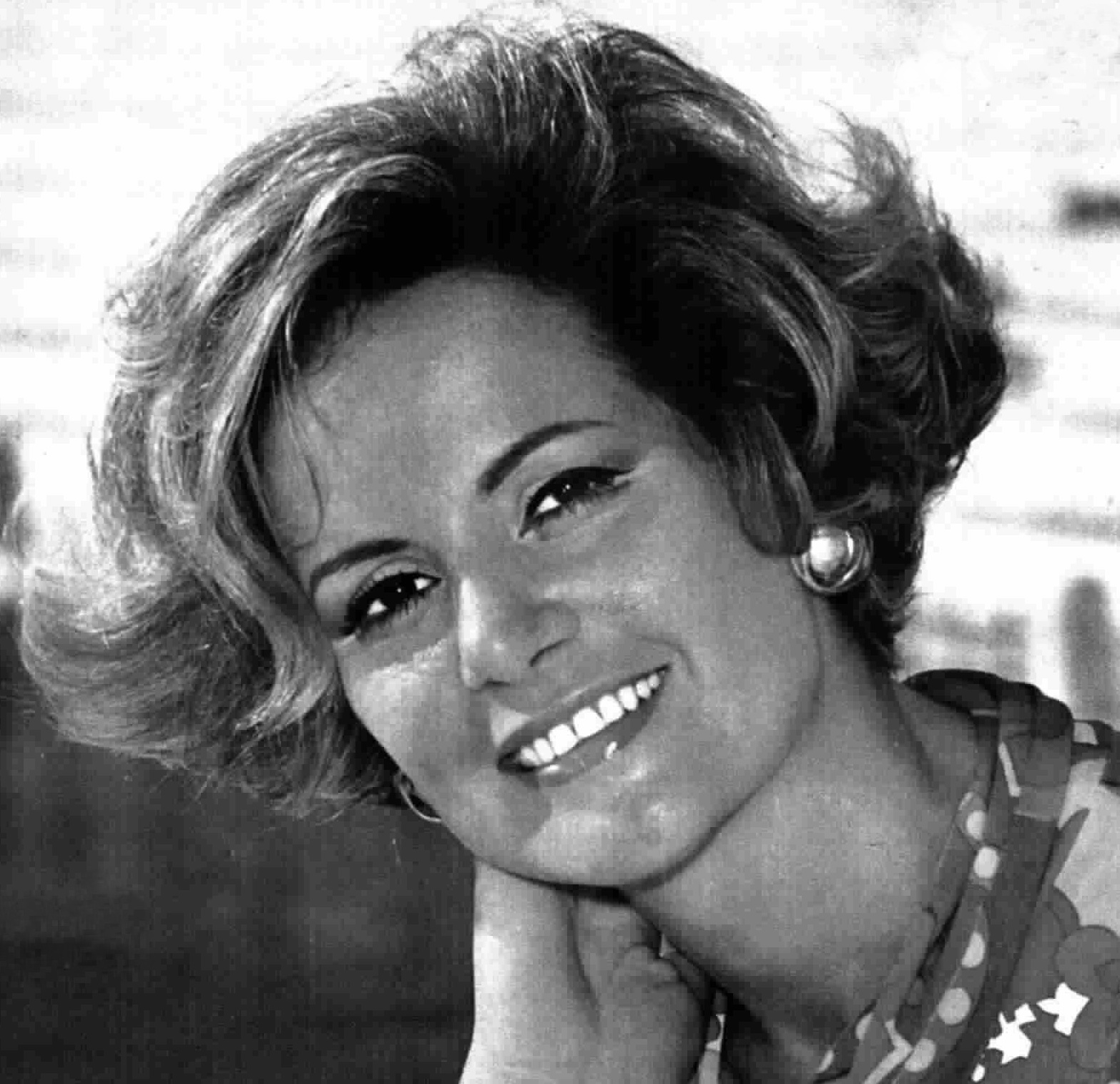
- Calandra in 1968
- Born: 10 February 1936; Moncalieri, Kingdom of Italy
- Died: 25 November 2018 (aged 82); Aprilia, Italy
- Occupation: Actress
- Years active: 1961–2018

Giuliana Calandra (10 February 1936 – 25 November 2018) was an Italian film, television and stage actress, journalist and television hostess.

== Life and career ==
Born in Moncalieri, Giuliana Calandra debuted in 1963 Pier Paolo Pasolini's La ricotta and appearing in hundreds of films, TV-series and stage works, including works by Dario Argento, Marco Ferreri, Alberto Sordi, Lina Wertmüller, Giorgio Albertazzi, Mario Monicelli, Costa-Gavras, Dino Risi, Sergio Corbucci, Alberto Lattuada.

In the 1980s she started a parallel career as journalist and TV-author/presenter, mainly focusing on fashion and entertainment.

Calandra died in Aprilia on 25 November 2018, at the age of 82.

== Selected filmography ==
- La calandria (1972) - Venegonda
- Love and Anarchy (1973)
- Story of a Cloistered Nun (1973)
- All Screwed Up (1974) - Biki
- The Beast (1974) - Amalia
- Terminal (1974)
- La nottata (1975)
- Deep Red (1975) - Amanda Righetti
- Convoy Buddies (1975) - Rosy
- Di che segno sei? (1975) - Maria Bompazzi
- Go Gorilla Go (1975) - Mrs. Sampioni
- The Last Woman (1976) - Benoite
- Giovannino (1976)
- Caro Michele (1976) - Ada
- Hit Squad (1976) - Tenente Adele Ciampini
- My Father's Private Secretary (1976) - Ersilia Ponziani
- Ecco noi per esempio (1977) - Beatrice
- Il... Belpaese (1977) - Elena
- Grand hôtel des palmes (1977)
- Difficile morire (1977)
- Nest of Vipers (1978) - Teacher
- Stay as You Are (1978) - Teresa
- Quando c'era lui... caro lei! (1978) - Queen of Italy
- C'est dingue... mais on y va (1979) - Doris Castagnet
- Womanlight (1979)
- L'affittacamere (1979) - Adele Bazziconi - wife of Settebeni
- Il corpo della ragassa (1979) - Laura Marengo
- Il lupo e l'agnello (1980) - Signora De Luca
- Il turno (1981) - Rosa
- My Darling, My Dearest (1982) - Zuava
- Sesso e volentieri (1982) - Giuliana
- Dio li fa poi li accoppia (1982) - Clara - don Celeste's housekeeper
- Journey with Papa (1982) - Rita Canegatti
- Occhio nero, occhio biondo e occhio felino (1983)
- Petomaniac (1983) - Giulia
- Arrivano i miei (1983)
- Jocks (1984) - Old singer
- A Proper Scandal (1984) - Maria Gastaldelli
- Trainer on the Beach (1984) - Mara Canà
- A tu per tu (1984) - Patrizia
- Desiring Julia (1986)
- Rimini Rimini (1987) - Jerry's Wife
- Regina (1987) - Lella
- Il coraggio di parlare (1987) - Furios woman
- The Belt (1989) - Bianca's Mother
- Faccione (1991)
- Non chiamarmi Omar (1992)
- Signorina Giulia (1992) - Zia Graziella
- Our Tropical Island (2001) - Mrs. Tacchini
- Per finta e per amore (2002)
- Adored (2003) - Franca Soldani (uncredited)
- L'allenatore nel pallone 2 (2008) - Mara Canà (final film role)
