= Adriana Martino =

Italian soprano and stage director (born 1931)

- Martino in 1960
- Born: 26 July 1931 (age 94); Caserta, Italy
- Occupation: Soprano

Adriana Martino (born 26 July 1931) is an Italian operatic soprano, folk singer and stage director.

== Life and career ==
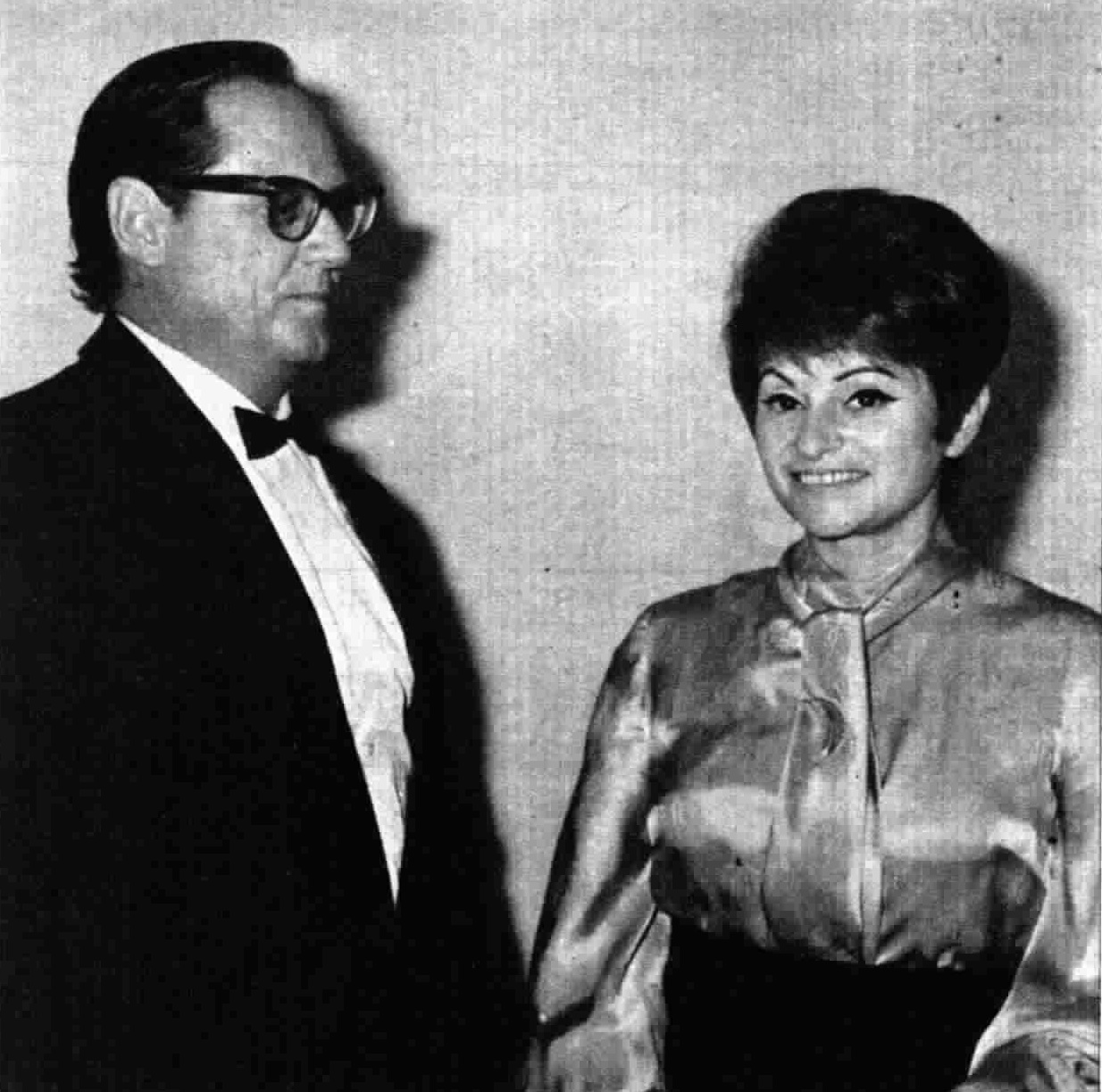
Martino with Sesto Bruscantini (Radiocorriere magazine, 1972)

The elder sister of singer Miranda Martino, Adriana Martino studied at the Accademia Nazionale di Santa Cecilia and at the Accademia Musicale Chigiana, and made her professional debut as a soprano in 1956, playing Musetta in Giacomo Puccini's La bohème.

Alongside her operatic activity, in which, among other things, she worked several times with Herbert von Karajan, she also recorded folk and traditional songs, and in the 1970s she came to prominence as a performer of political songs.

Married to composer Benedetto Ghiglia, with whom she founded the theater company "Teatro-Canzone", she was also active as a stage director, best known for the feminist play Nostro Fratello Donna ("Our Brother a Woman"). She also served as singing teacher at the Accademia Nazionale di Arte Drammatica Silvio D'Amico.

== Partial discography ==
Albums

- 1958 – Antologia della canzone napoletana (Columbia)
- 1971 – Donna... Amore... Dolore (with Miranda Martino) (RCA Italiana)
- 1972 – Cosa posso io dirti (Fonit Cetra)
- 1974 – Conosci il paese dove fioriscono i cannoni? (CBS)
- 1976 – Adriana Martino canta Brecht e Eisler (I Dischi dello Zodiaco)
