= John Randolph Pepper =

Italian theatre director and photographer (born 1958)

- Born: 1958 (age 67–68); Rome, Italy
- Education: Princeton University (History of Art, 1976)
- Occupations: Photographer; theatre director
- Years active: 1970–present
- Children: Sheppard Randolph Pepper; Jameson Charles Pepper; Aleksandr Johnovich Pepper
- Parent(s): Curtis Bill Pepper (father); Beverly Pepper (mother)
- Family: Jorie Graham (sister)
- Website: johnrpepper.it

John Randolph Pepper is an Italian photographer known for his black-and-white photography which has been showcased in exhibitions worldwide. His career in theater and film has led him to write and direct plays and movies all around the globe.

== Biography ==
Pepper was born in Rome, Italy, in 1958 to Curtis Bill Pepper, a war correspondent and the head of the Rome bureau for Newsweek magazine, and the sculptor Beverly Pepper. He has one sister, poet Jorie Graham. He was raised in Rome, Italy. He studied History of Art at Princeton University (1976) where he was also one of the original painting members of the '185 Nassau Street Painting Program' and was awarded the Whitney Painting Fellowship in 1975. In 1981 Pepper was admitted as a 'Directing Fellow' to the American Film Institute, Los Angeles.

== Photography ==
Pepper began his career as an apprentice to Ugo Mulas who gave him his first formal training in the art of street photography. Pepper pursued his work in photography (analog) for three decades while simultaneously directing in the theatre and in film. His show 'Rome: 1969 – An Hommage to Italian Neo-Realist Cinema' (USA/France 2008) lead him back to his native Italy where Lanterna Magica Edizioni published the book Sans Papier (Italy 2011) with subsequent exhibitions in Rome, Venice, Saint Petersburg (Russia), Paris, Palermo (Sicily).

In 2012, the Manège Museum in Saint Petersburg, (Russia) showed Pepper's new work which the Istituto Superiore Per la Storia della Fotografia (Italy) published as a new book of photographs in 2014 called 'Evaporations' that previews at the Officina delle Zattere in Venice (Italy).

In 2015, the Italian Institute of Culture and the Russia Federation Ministry of Culture sponsored a traveling exhibition that opened at the Rosphoto Photography Museum (Saint Petersburg, Russia).

In March 2015, Pepper had a retrospective exhibit at the Showcase Gallery in Dubai (United Arab Emirates).

The Italian Institute of Culture and The United States Mission in Russia sponsored a travelling exhibition (2015/2016) of Evaporations throughout Siberia, Russia (Vladivostok, Irkutsk, Novosibirsk, Omsk, Yekaterinburg, Samara and Moscow.

From November 2016 to January 2017, Pepper's Evaporations / Испарения was shown in Rome, (Italy) at Fondazione Terzo Pilastro e Meditteraneo's, 'Museo Palazzo Cipolla'. The monumental exhibit consisted of 52 works ranging from 120 x160cm to 3m x 5m.

In November 2017, Pepper inaugurated Inhabited Deserts at La Galerie du Palace in Paris. This show is the first stop of a traveling exhibition (France, Iran, United Arab Emirates, Israel, Russia, Italy and USA) of new photographs where Pepper questions whether man's presence has inexorably altered the landscape or whether the land is in essence still close to what it was before mankind arrived. In September 2018 Inhabited Deserts was presented at the Aaran Gallery in Tehran; then in November a selection of Inhabited Deserts was shown at Paris Photo 2019 with the Sophie Scheidecker Gallery before Pepper took the show to Tel Aviv at the 6th edition of the International festival Photo Is:Rael. From 12 December 2018 to 15 February Inhabited Deserts was presented at The Empty Quarter Gallery in Dubai, U.A.E., with curatorial text by Kirill Petrin. Subsequently, the show opened on 19 March 2019 in Saint Petersburg, Russia, at the Art of Foto Gallery and shortly thereafter, on 18 April, it returned to Tel Aviv at the NOX Contemporary Gallery. In 2020 Inhabited Deserts will be seen in the United States and Italy. In 2019, Pepper opened 'Rome 1969, An Homage to Italian Neo-Realism' at the RAW Streetphoto Gallery in Rotterdam, The Netherlands.

In October 2020, Inhabited Deserts, opened in the city of Todi (PG), Italy, supported by 'Fondazione Art e Cultura'(Professor Emmanuele Emanuele, President), the American Embassy in Rome and the city of Todi. The exhibition was preceded by a unique Peace Conference:'The Absent Border: Conflicts and New Harmonies', a unique Peace Conference, where an Iranian desert explorer sat and discoursed with an Israeli Archeologist, a Bedouin Sheikh, a Russian Curator, an American diplomat, an Italian Curator Gianluca Marziani, an American actor Giancarlo Esposito and John R. Pepper. The conference revolved how, through art and artists, countries and people in conflict, can create bridges of communication. Giancarlo Esposito, using one of Peppers desert photographs, created a drawing representing a new symbol for peace.

In 2021, Inhabited Deserts was one of the main events of the 2nd Biennale di Senigallia curated by Serge Plantureux. Also in 2021, Pepper participated in Bryansk International Photo Festival with 'Rome 1969 meets Sans Papier' photographs of Rome 40 years apart. In 2022 with the support of the Italian Embassy in Tbilisi, Pepper presented 'Fragments of Italy 1970–2010', Kolga Tbilisi Photo (Tbilisi, Georgia).

During 2023, Pepper exhibited 'Cleansing' at Matriusca Gallery (Seville, Spain) and, with the support of the Fondazione Terzo Pilastro/Fondazione Poema (Professor Emmanuele Emanuele, President) curated 'Curtis Bill Pepper, Un Viaggio in Sicilia 1959–1961' (Palazzo Albergati, Bologna, Italy).

=== Exhibitions ===
==== Rome 1969 ====
- Marianne Courteville Gallery (2007, New York City)
- Galerie Photo4 (2008, Paris)
- Galleria del Cortile (2009, Rome)
- Art of Foto Gallery (2016, Saint Petersburg, Russia)
- RAW Streetphoto Gallery (2019, Rotterdam)

==== Sans Papier ====
- Collegio Degli Armeni (2011, Venice)
- Galleria del Cortile (2011, Rome)
- Manege Museum (2012, Saint Petersburg)
- Galleria Extra Moenia (2013, Todi, Italy)

==== Retrospective exhibition ====
- Manege Museum (2011, Saint Petersburg)
- Showcase Gallery (2015, Dubai, UAE)
- Bryansk International Photography Festival (2021, Bryansk)
- Fragments of Italy 1970-2010 (2022, Tbilisi, Georgia)
- Galleria Giampaolo Abbondio (2023, Todi, Italy)
- Retrospective Exhibition (2024, Riga, Latvia)
- SNEG Gallery (2026, Moscow, Russia)

==== Evaporations ====
- Palazzo Esposizioni (2014, Rimini)
- Rosphoto Museum (2014, Saint Petersburg) Officina delle Zattere — Venice Architecture Biennale (2014, Venice)
- PhotoMed Photography Festival (2015, Sanary-sur-Mer)
- Russian State Art Museum (2015, Irkutsk)
- Gallery of Modern Art ARKA (2015, Vladivostok) Russian State Art Museum (2015, Novosibirsk);
- Russian State Art Museum (2015, Omsk)
- Russian Yekaterinburg Gallery of Modern Art (2015, Yekaterinburg)
- Gallery of Classic Photography (2016, Moscow)
- Museum of Modern Art (2016, Samara)
- Fondazione Terzo Pilastro Museo – Palazzo Cipolla (2016 - 2017, Rome)

==== Inhabited Deserts ====
- Galerie du Palace (2017, Paris)
- Aaran Gallery (2018, Tehran)
- Paris Photo 2018 with the Sophie Scheidecker Gallery
- International festival Photo Is:Rael (2018, Tel Aviv)
- The Empty Quarter Gallery (2018, Dubai)
- Art of Foto Gallery (2019, Saint-Petersburg)
- NOX Contemporary Art Gallery (2019, Tel Aviv)
- Museo civico and Pinacoteca di Todi / Nido dell'Aquila (2020–2021, Todi, Italy)
- 2nd Biennale di Senigallia (2021, Senigallia, Italy)
- PLAYLIST, Galleria Giampaolo Abbondio (2025, Milan, Italy)

==== Cleansing ====
- Matriusca Gallery (2023, Seville, Spain)

A Franciscan Priest in the 21st Century

- Italian Institute of Culture / Pennlab Gallery (2026, Moscow, Russia)

== Film ==
Pepper began work in film, working as assistant director for many directors including Joseph Losey ('Les Routes du Sud'), George Roy Hill ('A Little Romance' and 'The World According to Garp') and Dan Curtis ('Ghostbusters'). As a producer Pepper developed and brought to fruition the motion picture 'The Plague' (Albert Camus) directed by Luis Puenzo with William Hurt, Robert Duval, Raoul Julia, Sandrinne Bonnaire and Jean-Marc Barr. Music by Vangelis (Gaumont Distribution, France 1992). He directed the film version, 'Papillion de Nuit' (Trinacra Productions, 2001 winner of the 'Prix Mediavision' (2002) at the Sarlat Film Festival.

=== Filmography ===
Year	Title	Director	Producer	Writer
1978	Struggle for Survival	No	Yes	Yes
1981	Reborn	No	Yes	No
1982	A View from the Woods	No	Yes	Yes
1990	On Course	No	Yes	Yes
1991	Danny and the Deep Blue Sea	Yes	Yes	No
1992	The Plague	No	Yes	No
1994	Lie Down with Lions	No	Yes	No
1996	Little Italy	No	Yes	No
2002	Papillons de nuit	Yes	Yes	Yes
2002	A Nero Wolfe Mystery (Cop Killer)	Yes	No	No
2002	A Nero Wolfe Mystery (Immune to Murder)	Yes	No	No
2005	Sopra e sotto il ponte	No	Yes	No
2007	12 Noon	Yes	Yes	No

Actor

- Eva (1962)
- French Fried Vacation (1978)
- Molly O (1986)
- Specters (1987)
- Fireballs (1989)
- Personne ne m'aime (1994)

Second assistant director

- Roads to the South (1978)
- A Little Romance (1979)
- The World According to Garp (1982)
- The Winds of War (The Winds Rise) (1983)
- GhostBusters (1984)

== Theatre ==
Pepper's work in New York theatre includes: 'Cubistique' (Tom Cone), 'The Cruelties of Mrs. Schnayd' (David Suesdhorf), 'Sister Mary Ignatius Explains It All To You' (Christopher Durang); he was the youngest director at the Spoleto Festival (Charleston) when he presented 'Inner Voices' by Eduardo De Filippo.

Pepper has directed plays in Paris, France, and Russia. His productions include Retraite de Moscow (The Retreat from Moscow) by William Nicholson at Theatre Montparnasse (Paris 2008); 'Underneath the Lintel' by Glen Berger, Lederman Theatre, Stockholm, Sweden (2005); 'Pour En Découdre' by Marc-Michel Georges; 'Danny et la Grande Bleu' ('Danny and the Deep Blue Sea') by John Patrick Shanley at Avignon Theatre Festival (2000) then Paris' Theatre Déjazet with actor Léa Drucker nominated for a Molière Award (2001).

Pepper was the first foreign director to be invited to the Drama Theatre on Vasilievsky (aka Teatre Satir) in Saint Petersburg, Russia. His Russian language, production of My Dear Mathilde by Israel Horovitz is now permanently in the repertoire (2012). In 2016 Pepper opened a new production of Danny and the Deep Blue Sea in Italy (Danny e il Profondo Blu) at Teatro Garibaldi in Palermo with Leonardo Sbragia e Laura Anzani then in Milan before going to Naples, Salerno, Rome and touring Italy. Also in 2016 he opened a production of Sam Shepard's True West at Saint Petersburg Russian State Institute of Performing Arts. In 2018 Pepper directed the Italian premiere of John Patrick Shanley's Four Dogs and a Bone with an adaptation by Enrico Vanzina. It debuted at the Teatro Vittorio Alfieri in Naso, Sicily and then moved to a successful run in Rome at the OFF/OFF Theatre.

=== Theatrical performances ===
- 1983: Sister Mary Ignatius Explains It All for You (By Christopher Durang: Central Casting (New York)
- 1983: Cubistique (By Tom Cone, Théâtre Matrix (New York))
- 1983: Differente People, Differente Rooms (By Wendy Kesselman)
- 1986: The Cruelties of Mrs. Schnayd (By David Suehsdorf: New York Theatre Studio/T.O.M.I.)
- 1986: Inner Voices(By Eduardo De Filippo: American Premiere: Spoleto Festival (USA)
- 1999: The Weir (By Conor McPherson, Royal Court, The Players Club, N.Y.)
- 2000: Danny and the Deep Blue Sea (Original production April 2000 : Théâtre le Proscenium: Paris)
- 2000: Danny and the Deep Blue Sea (Reprise, June 2000: Théâtre Golovine: Avignon Festival)
- 2000: Danny and the Deep Blue Sea (Reprise February 2001: Théâtre Dejazet: Paris)
- 2002: Pour En Découdre (By Marc Michel Georges, Original production September 2002: Ciné 13 Théâtre – Paris)
- 2002: Pour En Découdre (By Glenn Berger, Original production, Teatre Le Lucernaire, Paris, France)
- 2002: Four Dogs and a Bone (By John Patrick Shanley, Original production July 2003 – Théâtre Golovine – Avignon Festival)
- 2002: The Actor's Nightmare (By Christopher Durang: Central Casting New York)
- 2002: A Schtick Is Born (By Sherry Nehmer and Daniel Harris, The Silver Lining – New York)
- 2002: Fifth of July (By Landorf Wilson, The Hangar Théâtre (New York))
- 2002: Tea and Sympathy (By W. Somerset Maugham, Production Italienne)
- 2002: The Workingman (By Tom Walmsley), Théâtre Matrix New York)
- 2005: Underneath the Lintel (By Glenn Berger, Original production, TeatreStudio Leederman, Stockholm)
- 2007: The Retreat from Moscow(By William Nicholson, Original production, January 2007, Théâtre Montparnasse, Paris)
- 2012: My Dear Mathilde (By Israel Horovitz, Original production, Théâtre Satir on Vasilevski Island, Saint Petersburg, Russia)
- 2016: Danny and the Deep Blue Sea (By John Patrick Shanley, Original production, February 2016: Théâtre Garibaldi, Palermo, Italia)
- 2016: True West (By Sam Shepard, Original production, May 2016, Théâtre Academy Drammatique Nationale de Russie, Saint Petersburg, Russia)
- 2016: Danny and the Deep Blue Sea (By John Patrick Shanley, Reprise: March 2016, Teatro Il Delfino, Milan, Italy)
- 2017: Danny and the Deep Blue Sea (By John Patrick Shanley, Reprise: April 2017, Teatro Sala Uno, Rome, Italy)
- 2017: Danny and the Deep Blue Sea (By John Patrick Shanley, Reprise: April 2017, Teatro Asoli, Naples, Italy)
- 2018: 4 Dogs and a Bone (By John Patrick Shanley, Reprise: February 2018, Teatro Alfieri, Naso, Italy)
- 2018: 4 Dogs and a Bone (By John Patrick Shanley, Reprise: March 2018, Teatro Off / Off, Rome, Italy)

== Books ==
- Sans Papier. Roberta Semeraro. Italy: Lanterna Magica. ISBN 978-88-97115-16-8.
- Evaporations/Испарения. Elizabeth Ferrer. Italy: Istituto Superiore Per la Storia della Fotografia. ISBN 978-88-87928-19-8.
- Inhabited Deserts. Kirill Petrin (2019). ISBN 978-15-27259-21-8.
- The Melodies and Passion of the Mediterranean by Marina Jigarkhanyan, Manège Museum catalog, 2011.
- Cities and People by Marina Jigarkhanyan, Manège Museum catalog, 2012.
- Jason Middlebrook - Todi Odyssey. Italy: Edomilia, 2022 ISBN 9788894700800.

== See also ==
- Street photography
- Straight photography
