= Le braghe del padrone =

1978 Italian comedy film

- Film poster
- Directed by: Flavio Mogherini
- Written by: Flavio Mogherini; Alberto Silvestri
- Produced by: Giorgio Salvioni
- Starring: Enrico Montesano
- Cinematography: Carlo Carlini
- Edited by: Adriano Tagliavia
- Music by: Riz Ortolani
- Release date: 1978
- Running time: 95 minutes
- Country: Italy
- Language: Italian

Le braghe del padrone is a 1978 Italian comedy film directed by Flavio Mogherini and starring Enrico Montesano. It is based on the novel of the same name written by Italo Terzoli and Enrico Vaime.

== Cast ==
- Enrico Montesano - Vittorio Pieroni
- Milena Vukotic - Liliana (Lilly)
- Paolo Poli - Il diavolo
- Adolfo Celi - Eugenio, il presidente
- Enrico Beruschi: Arch. Arturo Silvestri, segretario generale
- Eugene Walter: Avv. De Dominicis, cognato di Eugenio
- Felice Andreasi: Dott. Verzelli, capo ufficio
- Vanna Brosio: intervistatrice Rai-TV
- Annabella Incontrera: la moglie di Eugenio
