= Miranda (1985 film) =

- Italian theatrical release poster
- Directed by: Tinto Brass
- Written by: Tinto Brass
- Produced by: Giovanni Bertolucci
- Starring: Serena Grandi
- Cinematography: Silvano Ippoliti
- Music by: Riz Ortolani
- Release date: 15 October 1985
- Running time: 96 minutes
- Country: Italy
- Language: Italian
- Budget: $60,000

Miranda (also known as The Mistress of the Inn) is a 1985 Italian erotic drama film directed by Tinto Brass. It is loosely based on the three-act comedy La locandiera by Carlo Goldoni.

According to Filippo Ascione, Miranda was one of Federico Fellini's favorite films.

== Plot ==
Miranda (Serena Grandi) is an innkeeper living in a small Po Valley town of the late 1940s. She is left a widow after her husband is lost in World War II but she has been denying marriage, waiting (at least verbally) for her husband's return. Her lover is the transporter Berto (Andrea Occhipinti), but while Berto is away, she also runs affairs with other men, namely Carlo (Franco Interlenghi), an older and rich former fascist who buys expensive presents to Miranda and Norman (Andy J. Forest), an American engineer who works in the environs of the town. Meanwhile, Tony (Franco Branciaroli), an employee at the inn, also has a deep interest in Miranda but she always insists on keeping him at bay.

== Cast ==
- Serena Grandi
- Andrea Occhipinti
- Franco Interlenghi
- Andy J. Forest
- Franco Branciaroli
- Malisa Longo
- Laura Sassi
- Isabelle Illiers
- Luciana Cirenei
- Jean-René Lemoine
- Mauro Paladini
- Enzo Turrin

== Production ==
Director Tinto Brass asked the aspirants for the role of Miranda to strip completely naked in front of him during the audition. "I had to try a film scene, with the camera filming every part of my body," recalled Serena Grandi who was the chosen one.
