= Rimini Rimini =

- Theatrical release poster by Renato Casaro
- Directed by: Sergio Corbucci
- Written by: Mario Amendola; Bruno Corbucci; Sergio Corbucci; Massimo Franciosa; Maurizio Micheli; Marco Risi; Gianni Romoli; Bernardino Zapponi
- Starring: Paolo Villaggio; Jerry Calà; Serena Grandi; Andrea Roncato; Paolo Bonacelli
- Cinematography: Danilo Desideri
- Edited by: Tatiana Casini Morigi
- Release date: 3 March 1987 (Italy)
- Running time: 210 minutes (extended cut for TV in two episodes); 114 minutes (theatrical)
- Country: Italy
- Language: Italian

Rimini Rimini is a 1987 Italian anthology comedy film directed by Sergio Corbucci. It consists of five segments, all set in Rimini. The film has a sequel, Rimini Rimini - Un anno dopo, directed by Bruno Corbucci and released in 1988.

== Plot ==
The film is divided into episodes set on the beaches of Rimini. Gildo (Paolo Villaggio) is a moralistic magistrate who shuts down red light districts but his enemies conspire to photograph him in a compromising position with the sex goddess Lola (Serena Grandi). Laura Antonelli plays a wealthy woman who believes her husband has drowned. In another segment, a priest is forced to put his mouth on a topless nun as the battle of morality verses misbehavior unfolds. Additionally, a shy girl is forced to fall in love; a priest falls in love with a nun; and a poor employee is forced to do menial jobs to his master for not being fired.

== Cast ==
- Paolo Villaggio as Ermenegildo "Gildo" Morelli
- Serena Grandi as Lola / Ramona
- Jerry Calà as Gianni Bozzi
- Laura Antonelli as Noce Bovi
- Andrea Roncato as Don Andrea
- Eleonora Brigliadori as Liliana
- Maurizio Micheli as Pino Tricarico
- Paolo Bonacelli as Pedercini
- Sylva Koscina as Countess Pedercini
- Livia Romano as Marisa
- Adriano Pappalardo as Gustavo
- Monica Scattini as Simona
- Elvire Audray as Suora
- Gigi Sammarchi as Massimiliano "Max" Ponchielli
- Sebastiano Somma as Jerry
- Giuliana Calandra as Jerry's Wife
- Arnaldo Ninchi as Arnaldo
- Camillo Milli as Dr. Piedimonte

== Music ==
The theme song, "Rimini Splash Down" was produced by La Bionda and performed by Righeira.
