= Manlio Brosio =

Italian lawyer and politician (1897–1980)

Manlio Giovanni Brosio
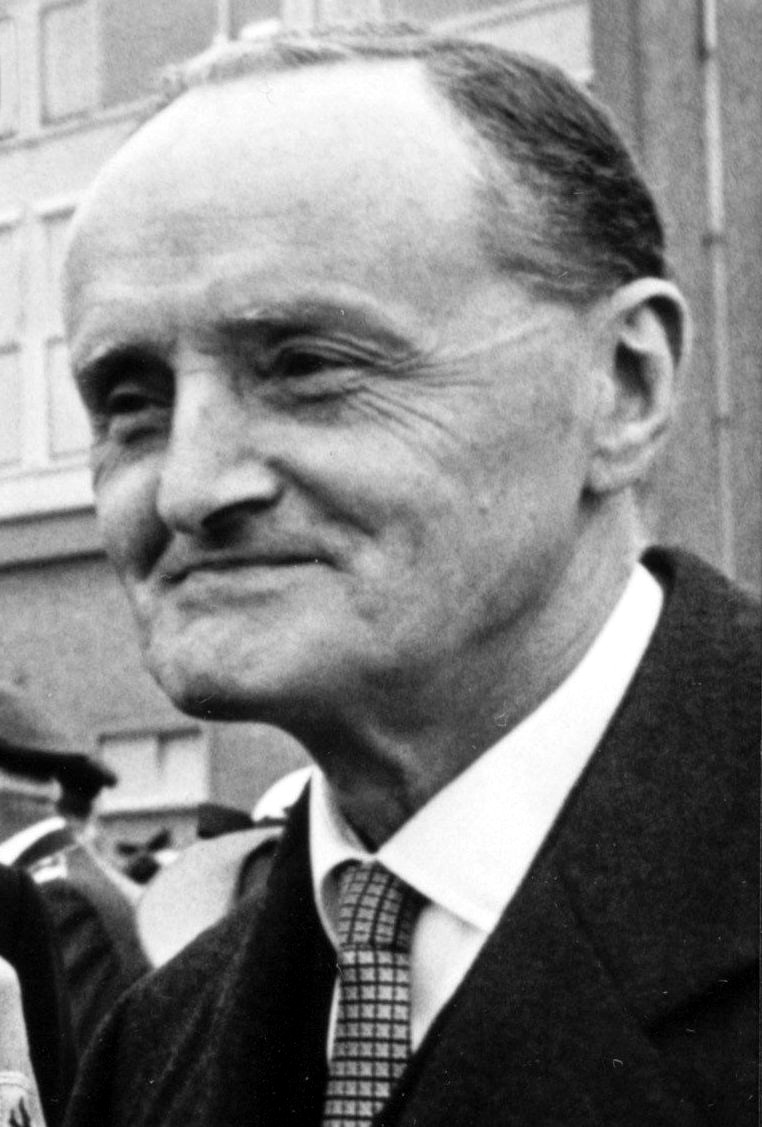
- Brosio in 1967

4th Secretary General of NATO
- In office 1 August 1964 – 1 October 1971
- Preceded by: Dirk Stikker
- Succeeded by: Joseph Luns

Minister of War
- In office 10 December 1945 – 13 July 1946
- Prime Minister: Alcide De Gasperi
- Preceded by: Stefano Jacini
- Succeeded by: Cipriano Facchinetti

Deputy Prime Minister
- In office 21 June 1945 – 10 December 1945 Serving with Pietro Nenni
- Prime Minister: Ferruccio Parri
- Preceded by: Palmiro Togliatti
- Succeeded by: Pietro Nenni

Personal details
- Born: Manlio Giovanni Brosio; 10 July 1897 Turin, Italy
- Died: 14 March 1980 (aged 82) Turin, Italy
- Party: Italian Liberal Party
- Relations: Vanna Brosio (niece)
- Education: University of Turin

Military service
- Allegiance: Kingdom of Italy
- Branch/service: Royal Italian Army
- Unit: Alpini
- Battles/wars: World War I

Manlio Brosio (10 July 1897 – 14 March 1980) was an Italian lawyer, diplomat, politician and the fourth secretary general of NATO between 1964 and 1971.

== Early life ==
Brosio was born in Turin to Edoardo Brosio and Fortunata Curadelli. He studied law at the University of Turin. During World War I, he served in the Alpine regiment as an artillery officer. After the war, he graduated from university and in 1920 entered politics. Later, his political activity was barred because of his opposition to fascism.

== Career ==
During World War II, after the Allied invasion of Italy in 1943, Brosio went underground and later became a member of the National Liberation Committee. After the war he re-entered politics, and became deputy prime minister and in 1945, the Minister of War.

In January 1947, Brosio became the Italian ambassador to the Soviet Union and got involved with the peace treaty negotiations between the countries. In 1952, he became ambassador to the UK, to the US in 1955, and to France from 1961 to 1964.

On 12 May 1964, the NATO council chose Brosio to succeed Dirk Stikker as secretary general. He resigned on 3 September 1971. On 29 September 1971, U.S. President Richard Nixon awarded him the Presidential Medal of Freedom.

== Personal life and death ==
Brosio died in Turin. He was the uncle of singer and television presenter Vanna Brosio.

== Honors ==
Order of Merit of the Italian Republic 1st Class / Knight Grand Cross – 2 June 1955
