= Vanna Brosio =

Italian singer, television personality, and journalist (1943–2010)

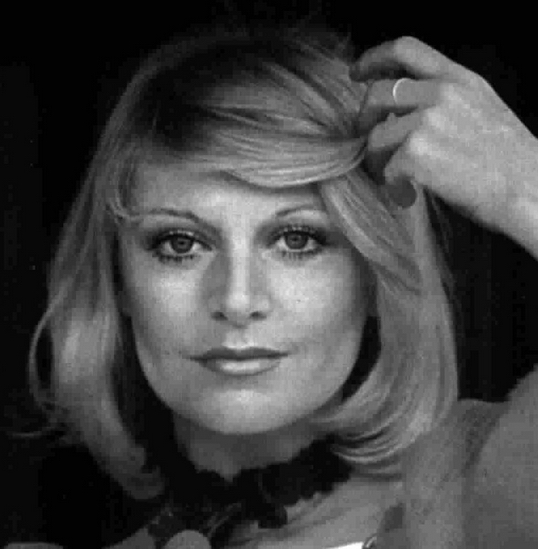
- Brosio in 1972
- Born: Giovanna Brosio; 18 April 1943; Turin, Kingdom of Italy
- Died: 19 June 2010 (aged 67); Turin, Italy
- Occupations: Singer; television personality; journalist
- Years active: 1948–2010

Vanna Brosio (born Giovanna Brosio; 18 April 1943 – 19 June 2010) was an Italian singer, television personality and journalist.

== Early life ==
Born Giovanna Brosio in Turin, she was the daughter of a well-known antiquarian and the niece of the former NATO Secretary General Manlio Brosio.

== Career ==
She started her career in 1948 as a model in Milan, appearing in magazines, fotoromanzi and Carosello commercials. In 1964 she started a more than twenty years musical career during which she recorded songs written for her by Enzo Jannacci, Cristiano Malgioglio and Gianni Boncompagni, among others. In 1971 she hosted the radio program Novità, and between 1972 and 1976 she hosted the RAI musical show Adesso musica. In 1984 she co-presented, alongside Aldo Biscardi, the sport talk-show Il processo del Lunedì. In addition to her musical and television activities, Brosio was also active as a journalist, collaborating for years with the magazine TV Sorrisi e Canzoni.

== Filmography ==
Year	Title	Role	Notes
1962	Dal sabato al lunedì		
1965	Viale della canzone		
1969	Mercanti di vergini		
1970	Cran d'arrêt	Marilina	
1975	White Horses of Summer	Nurse	
1978	Le braghe del padrone	TV Interviewer	(final film role)
