= L'allenatore nel pallone =

- Italian theatrical release poster by Enzo Sciotti
- Directed by: Sergio Martino
- Written by: Lino Banfi, Sergio Martino, Luciano Martino, Pier Francesco Pingitore, Romolo Guerrieri
- Produced by: Cecilia Bigazzi
- Starring: Lino Banfi
- Cinematography: Federico Zanni
- Edited by: Eugenio Alabiso
- Music by: Guido & Maurizio De Angelis
- Release date: 1984
- Running time: 96 minutes
- Country: Italy
- Language: Italian

L'allenatore nel pallone (also known as Trainer on the Beach) is a 1984 Italian comedy film directed by Sergio Martino. The title means literally The coach in the ball (were the word pallone means both ball and soccer/football), a pun on the Italian idiom "to go in the ball" which means "to get confused" or "to lose one's mind". The film was a box office success and achieved a large cult status in Italy, mainly thanks to the many cameo appearances by soccer players, coaches and journalists. The film had a sequel in 2008, L'allenatore nel pallone 2.

== Plot summary ==
Oronzo Canà, a manager with a far from good résumé, is hired as the coach of a small football team in northern Italy, called "Lombard" ("Longobarda"), which have secured a spot in the prestigious Serie A.

The decision is met with justified skepticism by the media, who mercilessly make fun of Canà after a run of poor results, including a 5–1 defeat against Roma and a 7–0 defeat against Milan. Oronzo is still optimistic about his chances, but it soon turns out the club's owner isn't willing to invest money to strengthen the team, as his plan is to get relegated to Serie B right away and he felt Canà was the ideal fall guy. Poor Oronzo is upset, but not ready to give up. He goes to Brazil with a friend of him (Andrea Roncato), a notorious swindler who passes himself as a talent scout/agent, in search of a good player. After having been promised some well-known Brazilian stars, Oronzo has to settle for Aristoteles, a young unknown they found playing on a dusty pitch for a minor team, and he takes him to Italy.

The young guy soon begins to show his great talent and Longobarda suddenly have a chance to actually avoid relegation. However his teammates, who are in cahoots with the owner, are hostile toward Aristoteles. Just before the final matchday, the chairman issues an ultimatum to Oronzo: "don't play Aristoteles, lose the final game of the season against Atalanta and get the team relegated to secure yourself a fat contract for next season". Canà is torn, but accepts the offer. Late in the game, however, encouraged by his daughter (whose love has helped Aristoteles to win saudade and to establish himself as a lethal forward), Oronzo takes off one of the corrupt players for his striker. With only minutes to go, Aristoteles scores twice to give Longobarda a decisive win to survive.

In the closing scene of joy, Canà is hailed by the fans as a hero, but the chairman fires him on the spot. To his "you're fired!" line, Oronzo replies "and you're a cuckhold", informing his former employer his young and beautiful wife had been sleeping with some of his dressing-room allies, adding insult to injury.

== Cast ==
- Lino Banfi: Oronzo Canà
- Licinia Lentini: la signora Borlotti
- Camillo Milli: il presidente Borlotti
- Giuliana Calandra: Mara Canà
- Stefania Spugnini: Michelina Canà
- Franco Caracciolo: Ceretti
- Andrea Roncato: Andrea Bergonzoni
- Gigi Sammarchi: Giginho
- Stefano Davanzati: Speroni
- Urs Althaus: Aristoteles
- Nils Liedholm: himself
- Giancarlo De Sisti: himself
- Roberto Pruzzo: himself
- Francesco Graziani: himself
- Carlo Ancelotti: himself
- Odoacre Chierico: himself
- Oscar Damiani: himself
- Luciano Spinosi: himself
- Roberto Scarnecchia: himself
- Zico: himself
- Sergio Santarini: himself
- Fabrizio Maffei: himself
- Giorgio Martino: himself
- Giampiero Galeazzi: himself
- Aldo Biscardi: himself
- Nando Martellini: himself
- Gianfranco Giubilo: himself
- Gila Golan: Florentia Garcia di Falcao della Madonna Incoronata
- Gino Pagnani: Socrates Abelardo Torres do Nascimento
