= Don Tonino =

- Genre: Comedy; Mystery
- Directed by: Fosco Gasperi
- Starring: Andrea Roncato; Gigi Sammarchi; Manuel De Peppe; Nicola De Buono; Lara Motta; Vanessa Gravina; Paolo Lizza; Marco Milano; Marisa Rampin; Claudia Lawrence; Carlo Sacchetti; Georgia Cavazzano
- Composers: Franco Godi; Pinuccio Pirazzoli
- Country of origin: Italy
- Original language: Italian
- No. of seasons: 2
- No. of episodes: 14

Original release
- Network: Italia 1
- Release: April 8, 1988 – November 8, 1990

Don Tonino is an Italian comedy-mystery television series.

== Cast ==
- Andrea Roncato as Don Tonino
- Gigi Sammarchi as Commissioner Sangiorgi
- Manuel De Peppe as Gabriele
- Nicola De Buono as Don Oreste
- Lara Motta as Maddalena
- Vanessa Gravina as Sara
- Paolo Lizza as Angelo
- Marco Milano as Marco

== See also ==
- List of Italian television series
