= I pompieri =

- Directed by: Neri Parenti
- Written by: Laura Toscano; Franco Marotta; Neri Parenti
- Starring: Paolo Villaggio; Lino Banfi; Massimo Boldi; Christian De Sica; Andrea Roncato; Ricky Tognazzi; Gigi Sammarchi
- Cinematography: Emilio Loffredo
- Edited by: Sergio Montanari
- Music by: Bruno Zambrini
- Release date: 25 October 1985
- Running time: 89 minutes
- Country: Italy
- Language: Italian

I pompieri (Italian: The firemen) is a 1985 Italian comedy film directed by Neri Parenti.

A sequel entitled Missione eroica – I pompieri 2 was released in 1987.

== Cast ==
- Paolo Villaggio as Paolo Casalotti
- Lino Banfi as Nicola Ruoppolo
- Massimo Boldi as Max Pirovano
- Christian De Sica as Alberto Spina
- Andrea Roncato as Armando Bigotti
- Ricky Tognazzi as Daniele Traversi
- Gigi Sammarchi as Commander Pacini
- Paola Onofri as Cristina
- Claudio Boldi as Tom
- Paola Tiziana Cruciani as Signora Casalotti
- Moana Pozzi as Amalia Ruoppolo
