= Italian Restaurant =

- Genre: Comedy
- Created by: Gigi Proietti
- Directed by: Giorgio Capitani
- Starring: Gigi Proietti; Nancy Brilli; Adriano Pappalardo; Tiberio Murgia; Luigi Montini; Carlo Molfese; Giacomo Piperno; Cristiana Capotondi; George Hilton
- Country of origin: Italy
- Original language: Italian
- No. of seasons: 1
- No. of episodes: 8

Production
- Camera setup: Luigi Kuveiller

Original release
- Network: Rai 1
- Release: November 6 – December 17, 1994

Italian Restaurant is an Italian comedy television series.

== Cast ==
- Gigi Proietti: Giulio Broccoli
- Nancy Brilli: Connie Mancuso
- Adriano Pappalardo: Frank Di Giacomo
- Tiberio Murgia: Salvatore
- Cristiana Capotondi: Angie
- Luigi Montini: Mancuso
- Carlo Molfese: Carmine Capurro
- Giacomo Piperno: Gerard Lawrence
- George Hilton: Goldsteen
- Gianni Garko: Henken
- Elena Presti: Anita
- Corrado Olmi: psicanalista
- Marisa Merlini: cartomante

== See also ==
- List of Italian television series
