= L'allenatore nel pallone 2 =

2008 comedy film

- Theatrical release poster
- Directed by: Sergio Martino
- Written by: Lino Banfi; Sergio Martino; Luciano Martino; Romolo Guerrieri; Luca Biglione
- Produced by: Luciano Martino
- Starring: Lino Banfi; Biagio Izzo; Anna Falchi; Giuliana Calandra
- Cinematography: Bruno Cascio
- Edited by: Eugenio Alabiso; Alessandro Cerquetti
- Music by: Amedeo Minghi
- Distributed by: Medusa Film
- Release date: 11 January 2008
- Running time: 112 minutes
- Country: Italy
- Language: Italian

L'allenatore nel pallone 2 is a 2008 Italian sports comedy film directed by Sergio Martino. The film is a sequel of L'allenatore nel pallone (1984).

== Plot ==
The famous Italian football coach Oronzo Canà has retired to a villa in Apulia. Now, old and tired, he is enjoying a quiet life there, cultivating his vineyard, when suddenly he is summoned to Milan, in northern Italy. There the elderly chairman of a great Lombard ("Longobarda") club is suffering from dementia and has lost his powers of judgement, and the club's manager has been fired. He has decided to bring back Oronzo Canà as trainer, remembering him from his great football team of thirty years before, tasking him with bringing the club back to its old winning ways. Oronzo puts his trust in the intervention of a Russian billionaire who has bought the club for promotion. But it is a deception.

== Cast ==
- Lino Banfi: Oronzo Canà
- Giuliana Calandra: Mara Canà
- Anna Falchi: Gioia Desideri
- Biagio Izzo: Fedele
- Stefania Spugnini: Michelina Canà
- Alessandro Bonanni: Oronzino
- Andrea Roncato: Andrea Bergonzoni
- Urs Althaus: Aristoteles
- Joanna Moskwa: Myra
- Alessandro Del Piero: himself
- Francesco Totti: himself
- Gianluigi Buffon: himself
- Mirko Da Cruz Evora: Caninho
- Emilio De Marchi: Ramenko
- Andrea Pucci: Borlotti jr
- Ilaria D'Amico: himself
- Francesco Graziani: himself
- Massimo Mauro: himself
- Little Tony: himself
- Claudio Lotito: himself
- Sandro Piccinini: himself
- Giampiero Mughini: himself
- Andriy Shevchenko: himself
- Carlo Ancelotti: himself
- Clarence Seedorf: himself
- Marco Materazzi: himself
- Luca Toni: himself
- Luciano Spalletti: himself
- Carlo Mazzone: himself
- Filippo Inzaghi: himself
- Alberto Aquilani: himself
- Massimo Oddo: himself
- Giancarlo Antognoni: himself
- Alberto Gilardino: himself
- Fulvio Collovati: himself
- Marco Amelia: himself
