= Aldo Ralli =

Italian stage, film and television actor

- Born: 21 October 1935; Pisa, Italy
- Died: 6 March 2016 (aged 80); Rome, Italy
- Occupation: Actor

Aldo Ralli (21 October 1935 – 6 March 2016) was an Italian stage, film and television actor.

== Life and career ==
Born in Pisa, Ralli started his career on stage, as the sidekick of popular comedians such as Erminio Macario, Carlo Dapporto and Beniamino Maggio. With the decline of revue and avanspettacolo, from the late 1970s he specialized in character roles, being cast in dozens of comedy films. He also worked several times with Paolo Sorrentino, and among his most successful performances there was the role of Captain Cavicchi in the Italia 1 TV-series Classe di ferro.

== Partial filmography ==
- Ric e Gian alla conquista del West (1967) - mister James
- The Great Silence (1968) - Al's Deputy (uncredited)
- Isabella, duchessa dei diavoli (1969) - Baron's Doctor
- Lisa dagli occhi blu (1970)
- Le segrete esperienze di Luca e Fanny (1980) - Fanny's Father
- Delitto a Porta Romana (1980) - Professor Baldi
- La dottoressa di campagna (1981) - Don Anselmo
- Chiamate 6969: taxi per signora (1981)
- Crime at the Chinese Restaurant (1981) - Customs Office Director
- Pierino il fichissimo (1981) - Romolo
- La casa stregata (1982)
- Biancaneve & Co... (1982) - Dammelo
- Delitto sull'autostrada (1982) - Camionista
- Emanuelle in the Country (1982) - Remo Bianchi
- Il diavolo e l'acquasanta (1983) - Allenatore
- Crime in Formula One (1984) - Daniele Bertoni
- Roma. L'antica chiave dei sensi (1984) - Midas
- Roba da ricchi (1987) - Insurance Manager
- Il volpone (1988) - Prete
- Rimini Rimini - Un anno dopo (1988) - Pisciasotto' - Nicola's friend ("La legge del taglione)
- Abbronzatissimi (1991) - Uomo importante
- Crazy Underwear (1992) - Nando Crass
- Vacanze sulla neve (1999) - Pino, hotel director
- Fantozzi 2000 – La clonazione (1999) - Scienziato
- Pazzo d'amore (1999)
- Il divo (2008) - Giuseppe Ciarrapico
- The Great Beauty (2013) - Cardinale
- Youth (2015) - Hotel Manager (final film role)
