= Premiatissima =

- Country of origin: Italy
- Original language: Italian
- No. of seasons: 5

Original release
- Network: Canale 5
- Release: October 29, 1982 – January 17, 1987

Premiatissima is an Italian Saturday night variety show, broadcast on Canale 5 between 1982 and 1987. It is considered the Fininvest response to RAI Saturday night show Fantastico.

The structure of the show reprised Canzonissima, with a competition between singers who were voted through voting cards which were contained in the weekly magazine TV Sorrisi e Canzoni, and in Dixan detergent drums, which also served as lottery tickets.

== Editions ==
Year	Episodes	Broadcasting dates	Cast	Winners
1982	13	29 October – 31 December	Claudio Cecchetto, Amanda Lear, Fabrizia Carminati	
1983	14	1 October – 31 December	Johnny Dorelli, Amanda Lear, Gigi Sabani, Gigi e Andrea, Nadia Cassini	
1984–85	17	6 October – 26 January	Johnny Dorelli, Ornella Muti, Gigi Sabani, Gigi e Andrea, Miguel Bosé	Fiorella Mannoia
1985–86	15	4 October – 10 January	Johnny Dorelli, Alfredo Papa, La Tresca, Nino Manfredi, Sabrina Salerno	Ricchi e Poveri
1986–87	15	11 October – 17 January	Johnny Dorelli, Enrico Montesano, Lello Arena, Paola Perego, Alessandra Cavagnero	Rossana Casale
