= Adriano Pappalardo =

Italian singer and actor

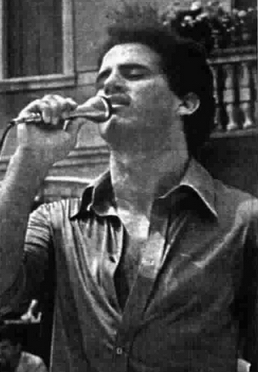
- Pappalardo in 1972

Background information
- Born: 25 March 1945 (age 81); Copertino, Lecce, Italy
- Genres: Rhythm and blues; blue-eyed soul
- Occupations: Singer; actor
- Years active: 1971–present
- Labels: Numero Uno; RCA; Polydor; Ariston

Adriano Pappalardo (born 25 March 1945) is an Italian singer, actor and television personality.

== Biography ==
Born in Copertino, Lecce, Pappalardo started his career in 1971 with the song "Una donna". He obtained his first success in 1972 with the R'n'B single "E' ancora giorno", written as some of his other songs of the time by the couple Lucio Battisti-Mogol, which ranked second in the Italian hit parade. After some other minor hits, such as the songs "Segui lui" and "Come bambini", Pappalardo had his major success in 1979 with the ballad "Ricominciamo". In mid-eighties, following the commercial failure of the two albums Immersione and Oh! Era ora he focused on his acting career, usually playing tough men and villains.

In 2003 Pappalardo had a significant personal success as a contestant of the reality show L'Isola dei Famosi (the Italian version of Celebrity Survivor). In 2004 he took part at the Sanremo Music Festival with the song "Nessun consiglio".

== Discography ==
=== Studio albums ===
- 1972: Adriano Pappalardo (Numero Uno, ZSLN 55151)
- 1973: California no (Numero Uno, DZSLN 55662)
- 1975: Mi basta così (RCA, TPL 1 1159)
- 1979: Non mi lasciare mai(RCA, PL 31505)
- 1982: Immersione (Numero Uno, ZPLN 34165)
- 1983: Oh! Era ora (Numero Uno, 81990)
- 1988: Sandy (CGD, 20836)

== Filmography ==
- A tu per tu (1984)
- Rimini Rimini (1987)
- Rimini Rimini – Un anno dopo (1988)
- La piovra, season 4 (1989)
- Classe di ferro (TV Series, 1989–1991)
- Italian Restaurant (TV Series, 1994)
- Racket (TV Series, 1997)
- Kaputt Mundi (1998)
- This Is Not Paradise (2000)
- Canone inverso – Making Love (2000)
- Saint Rita (TV Movie, 2004)
- Il falco e la colomba (TV Series, 2009)
