= Flavio Mogherini =

Italian production designer (1922–1994)

- Born: 25 March 1922; Arezzo, Italy
- Died: 23 April 1994 (aged 72); Rome, Italy
- Occupations: Production designer Art director Film director
- Years active: 1947–1994

Flavio Mogherini (25 March 1922 – 23 April 1994) was an Italian production designer, art director and film director. His career spanned from 1947 to 1994.

His daughter Federica Mogherini was High Representative of the Union for Foreign Affairs and Security Policy of the European Union from 2014 to 2019.

== Selected filmography ==
- The Lion of Amalfi (1950)
- The Knight Has Arrived! (1950)
- The Reluctant Magician (1951)
- Vacation with a Gangster (1951)
- The Two Friends (1955)
- Count Max (art direction, 1957)
- The Wonders of Aladdin (art direction, 1961)
- To Love Ophelia (1974)
- Paolo Barca, Schoolteacher and Weekend Nudist (1975)
- Lunatics and Lovers (1976)
- The Pyjama Girl Case (1977)
- Le braghe del padrone (1978)
- Per vivere meglio, divertitevi con noi (1978)
- I camionisti (1982)
- Delitto passionale (1994)
