= Savage Man Savage Beast =

1975 Italian mondo film

- Theatrical poster
- Directed by: Antonio Climati; Mario Morra
- Written by: Antonio Climati; Mario Morra; Narration: Alberto Moravia
- Produced by: Antonio Climati; Mario Morra
- Narrated by: Giuseppe Rinaldi
- Cinematography: Antonio Climati
- Edited by: Antonio Climati; Mario Morra
- Music by: Carlo Savina
- Distributed by: Titanus Distribuzione
- Release date: 24 October 1975
- Running time: 94 minutes
- Country: Italy
- Language: Italian

Savage Man Savage Beast (Italian: Ultime grida dalla savana, lit. 'Final Cry from the Savanna') is a 1975 Italian mondo documentary film co-produced, co-written, co-edited and co-directed by Antonio Climati and Mario Morra. Filmed all around the world, its central theme focuses on hunting and the interaction between man and animal. Like many mondo films, the filmmakers claim to document real, bizarre and violent behavior and customs, although some scenes were actually staged. It is narrated by the Italian actor and popular dubber Giuseppe Rinaldi and the text was written by Italian novelist Alberto Moravia.

This was the first film of Climati's and Morra's Savage Trilogy, which also includes Savana violenta (This Violent World) and Dolce e selvaggio (Sweet and Savage). Arguably the most notorious film of the trilogy, Ultime grida dalla savana became influential in exploitation cinema by use of cinematographic techniques that were repeated in numerous subsequent Mondo films. Two scenes in particular, a lion attack on a tourist in Namibia and the murder of an indigenous man by a group of mercenaries in South America, have gained notoriety as genuine footage of human death. The film also sparked a rivalry between the team of Climati and Morra and the brothers Alfredo and Angelo Castiglioni. These two teams became the forerunners of the second generation of mondo cinema.

== Synopsis ==
The film is a depiction of various scenes, usually violent or bizarre, that somehow relate to hunting. Each scenario is presented one after the other with little regard for narrative continuity. The opening scene introduces a Patagonian hunter who hunts stags to survive. The opening credits play over as he chases after a stag, which he ultimately shoots, kills, and beheads. Afterwards, one of the numerous scenes of anti-hunting gatherings is shown, this one in Cape Cod. The attention quickly shifts to wildlife hunting, where a monkey is killed by a leopard, and then a squirrel monkey by an anaconda. The theme changes again to the social hunt of wild game in Australia and Africa. Indigenous Australians hunt kangaroos and other large marsupials with spears and giant bats with boomerangs. Indigenous tribes of Africa hunt large game, including antelope, buffalo, and elephants, in the savanna. Religious ceremonies are also shown, where the African hunters proceed to suck fresh blood from the entrails of an antelope, and the Indigenous Australians symbolically bury their prey in dust to placate the spirits of the animals. Lastly, two brothers are arrested after partaking in a form of ritual post-mortem cannibalism of three of their relatives to acquire the hunting skills of the dead.

Other hunting traditions then follow, again rooted in religion. The warriors of the Kuru tribe in Africa commit a sacred act in which they copulate with the ground in belief that it will make the Earth fertile and produce animals for the hunt, and a stag hunt in France, rooted in ancient pagan beliefs of the Gauls, is blessed by a mass before the hunt takes place, during which the hunters and dogs chase and ultimately kill a fleeing stag. In a fox hunt, the Wild Fox Association sabotages the hunting efforts by serving wine laced with a laxative to the hunters and distracting the dogs with an Afghan Hound in heat. Their efforts are then connected to species conservation, and to exemplify that hunters are truly concerned in wildlife conservation, Argentine hunters capture an Andean condor to sell to a zoo. A collage of other conservation efforts is shown, including the tagging of white rhinoceroses, grizzly bears and elephants, which are shot with morphine darts. Argentinian deer and elephant seals are physically subdued and marked. Tourists on Africans safaris then come to view the conservation efforts, which the narrator claims to have seemingly negated the animals' violent instincts. This deception is demonstrated with the mauling of a tourist named Pit Dernitz by lions.

Another anti-hunting demonstration becomes the film's focus, this time on the Isle of Wight. Nudity and intercourse are practiced freely amongst the demonstrators, and this is contrasted with ancient hunter-gathering groups, who had strict rules concerning nudity. The narrator argues that once hunting had left this group of people, so did their rules toward nudity. Also highlighted is the contradiction that though this people are against hunting, thousands of farm-raised animals had to die to support them. The focus changes to Humboldt penguins, which cannot hunt because of polluted waters, and thus seem detached and without focus. This effect is compared to modern day Eskimos, who no longer hunt since the discovery of oil in their homeland and have fallen into depression and melancholy. To reverse the process, several groups of men go out and revive their hunting ways. Reflected in this is a montage of gun ownership, which the film relates to feelings of masculinity, followed by shots of illegal elephant poaching from Africa. To offset the dwindling number of game due to poaching, warriors from the Lobi tribe celebrate the "Ceremony of Life", in which they masturbate with ceremonial rods and pour the product into the river, hoping the animals will drink the semen and multiply. Attention shifts to large electronic probes in the Peruvian savanna used to measure the winds of El Niño for optimal fishing conditions. Fishing birds are also electronically tagged so the prime fishing areas can be located based on the birds' fishing habits. This fish frenzy in South America is reflected in the salmon run in Alaska, where kodiak bears hunt and fight for prey.

An examination of a hunting tradition in northern Europe follows, where falcons assist humans in hunting by catching wild game, such as rabbits and pheasants. Further collaboration with man and animal is highlighted, this time with cheetahs. To demonstrate the cheetah's speed and effectiveness, a chase between a group of cheetahs and ostriches is arranged, in which the birds are hunted down and killed. The next animal collaborators are dogs, which hunt wild boar in Patagonia and a puma which has attacked a herd of sheep and a shepherd. In cities, however, stray dogs are the ones hunted by dog catchers, which the narrator claims demonstrates that the hunt is still active, but the prey has changed. Indigenous groups in South America also use dogs to hunt monkeys, but their efforts are compared to mercenaries hunting the native people themselves to clear them from their land for development. In one such instance, mercenaries retaliate against a death of a workman by hunting down a group of natives, one of whom they torture, castrate and murder. Various scenes of wildlife are then shown, after which orangutans are hunted to be sold to zoos. The film then ends with the coexistence of man and animal between Erik Zimen, an ecologist, and wolves, the group of animals he wishes to save.

== Production ==
=== Direction ===
As their former cinematographer, Climati drew influence from the Mondo films of Gualtiero Jacopetti and Franco Prosperi. The cinéma vérité styled camera work used in Ultime grida dalla savana was previously used in Africa addio in a scene in which the film crew is nearly killed during an uprising in newly independent Ethiopia. The inclusion of lingering Technicolor shots and violence towards animals is also a feature of Jacopetti's Mondo cane series. Some scenes were also directly lifted from Africa addio and reused in Ultime grida dalla savana. David Kerekes and David Slater, authors of Killing for Culture: An Illustrated History of Death Film from Mondo to Snuff, also note that, "Savage Man Savage Beast is a slight return to the more encyclopaedic world view of mondo cinema which was prevalent in the 60s," demonstrating Climati's early roots in Mondo cinema.

=== Music ===
The songs and musical score used in the film were composed and written by Carlo Savina and Gilbert Kaplan. The songs were sung by Kaplan and Ann Collin. The music resembles Riz Ortolani's score from Africa addio, as most tracks are of a light and upbeat nature, particularly during the opening and closing credits. The arrangement of music to enhance atmosphere and create comic effect also mimics the compositions in Africa addio.

== Reaction ==
The film was released in Italy on 24 October 1975, and internationally in 1976. The film fared well in Asia; in 1976, Ultime grida dalla savana was outgrossed in Hong Kong only by Jaws. In Japan, it was the second highest-grossing foreign film with theatrical rentals of 1.75 billion Yen, behind only King Kong. Despite this, reception to the film from mainstream movie critics is almost completely negative, although it is well accepted by critics in exploitation film circles: Mark Goodall calls the film a "remarkable, pseudo-philosophical mondo examination of hunting fixated on the cyclical, the (inter)relationship of the hunter and the hunted", and Kerekes & Slater also comment that it was, "The success of Savage Man... Savage Beast [that] inaugurated the 'savage' trilogy."

=== Criticism ===
The content of the film, particularly the graphic violence and human death, has been criticized as too explicit and exploitative. Robert Firsching of Allmovie states:

The reason for the film's notoriety, however, is a collection of grainy 16 mm images depicting the horrific round-up, mutilation, castration, and slaughter of a group of tribesmen by white mercenaries. As appalling and revolting a sequence as ever depicted in a documentary film, the massacre footage marked something of a turning point in the development of the mondo subgenre, which moved increasingly toward snuff-like collections of death and mutilation.

Time Out Film Guide made similar criticisms of the film's content, calling it "[a] bloody, blatantly exploitative mess of a movie", and says it is "just another opportunity to gawp at raw scenes of sex and (more especially) violence". Due to its graphic content, the film was also used by James Ferman at the British Academy of Film and Television Arts as an example of the need for film censorship.

The inclusion of several staged or scripted scenes has made the film a target for critical condemnation. Numerous scenes have been proven fake, including the anti-fox hunting campaign involving the fictional "Wild Fox Association" and the murder of the indigenous men by mercenaries. During another wildlife rally, the fabrication of the scene is apparent with the presence of Italian porn star Ilona Staller. The lion attack on Pit Dernitz is also suspected of being a fabrication by film historians.

Although staged footage has been included since the early history of Mondo cinema, these scenes are nonetheless targets for critical abashment. Kerekes and Slater call the anti-fox hunt sequence "self-parody", and Goodall labels the same scene as "ludicrous". The staged scenes of human death have also been criticized for being more exploitative than educational. Aside from his criticism of the film's staged footage, Goodall also points out the reuse of sequences of African tribal hunting and poaching from Africa addio as a flaw of the film.

== Controversy ==
The death of Pit Dernitz is one of the most frequently censored scenes from the film.

Due to its graphic content, Ultime grida dalla savana has encountered censorship issues with certain countries' film boards. In Australia, the Office of Film and Literature Classification (OFLC) banned both an uncut and cut version of the film in 1976. An appeal filed later that year was denied. Ten years later, the home video distributor Palace Video brought the same cut print before the film board and it received an R18+ rating. The cuts include segments from the lion attack, the torture and murder of the indigenous man by mercenaries, the death of a fox by a pack of hounds, and the death of a stag by a hunter in the opening scene.

The film faced similar censorship problems for its theatrical release in the United Kingdom. In 1976, nearly 10 minutes were cut before it was passed with an X-rating by the British Board of Film Classification (BBFC). Various scenes of animal cruelty, a race between cheetahs and ostriches, the lion attack, and the mercenaries' hunt of Amazonian natives were all cut from the British release. The scenes of animal cruelty were targeted by the Royal Society for the Prevention of Cruelty to Animals (RSPCA) to be cut from the film, specifically the hunt and disembowelment of a puma. Also in 1976, the Valtion elokuvatarkastamo, the Finnish film classification board, banned the film in Finland in its entirety for the inclusion of scenes of genuine human death.

In Italy, the film was only rated ages 14+.

== Influence ==
The release of Ultime grida dalla savana initiated a rivalry between Climati and Morra and two other Italian Mondo film makers, Angelo and Alfredo Castiglioni. These two filmmaking teams became the frontrunners of the Mondo genre in the late seventies and early eighties. The Castiglionis had made two previous Mondo films, Africa segreta and Africa ama, before the release of Ultime grida dalla savana. They later released three additional films: Magia nuda in 1975, Addio ultimo uomo in 1978, Africa dolce e selvaggio in 1982. Climati and Morra made two follow-up films to Ultime grida dalla savana. The first followup, Savana violenta, also known as Savage Man Savage Beast no. 2, was released in 1976. Savana violenta was slightly less graphic in its depiction of violence. The last film, Dolce e selvaggio, was released in 1983 and consisted partly of outtakes and recycled footage from Climati and Morra's two previous films. Each subsequent release by the two parties would attempt to outperform the previous films with more explicit and shocking content.

The scenes of human death, which were shot in a manner that resembled an observational documentary, became influential in exploitation cinema, as several subsequent films would use similar filming techniques to lend certain scenes a sense of increased realism. The Mondo film Addio ultimo uomo, directed by the brothers Angelo and Alfredo Castiglioni, includes a scene of "amateur footage" that mimics the scene in which mercenaries hunt natives in Ultime grida dalla savana. This scene, in which an African bushman is captured, tortured, and castrated by a rival tribe, has also been proven staged. Again in 1978, the death film Faces of Death included fabricated "amateur footage" that is a reenactment of the death of Pit Dernitz, replacing lions with a bear. Firsching and Goodall also note that Ultime grida dalla savana was a transitional film within the genre, as it, "provided a vital link between the 'classic' shockumentaries of the early-mid 1960s and the much crueller mondos of the mid 1970s and beyond." Pit Dernitz's supposed death from being mauled by lions was featured later in Traces of Death.

Director Ruggero Deodato also used this camera style prolifically in his film Cannibal Holocaust, in which a group of filmmakers goes missing after they head into the South American rain forest to make a documentary on local cannibal tribes. In the film, only the team's footage is recovered, which is all shot in the cinéma vérité style that resembles the "amateur footage" in Ultime grida dalla savana. The footage from Cannibal Holocaust proved so realistic that Deodato was arrested for making a snuff film. Charges were ultimately dropped when he produced the supposedly slain actors for the courts.
