= Sweet and Savage =

- Theatrical release poster
- Italian: Dolce e selvaggio
- Directed by: Antonio Climati; Mario Morra
- Written by: Antonio Climati; Mario Morra
- Produced by: Franco Prosperi
- Narrated by: Franco Prosperi
- Cinematography: Antonio Climati
- Edited by: Mario Morra
- Music by: Daniele Patucchi
- Distributed by: Titanus
- Release date: 2 September 1983
- Running time: 93 minutes
- Country: Italy
- Language: Italian

Sweet and Savage (Italian: Dolce e selvaggio) is a 1983 Italian mondo film directed by Antonio Climati and Mario Morra. The title "Sweet and Savage" refers to the juxtaposition of pleasant 'sweet' and violent 'savage' imagery within the film. It is narrated by the producer and long-time Mondo film director Franco Prosperi.

The film is the third and final entry in Climati and Morra's Savage Trilogy and is also the last collaborative feature between the two directors. Footage in the film was supplemented by scenes that originally appeared in their previous two films, Ultime grida dalla savana and Savana violenta. Morra went on to direct one final Mondo film, The Savage Zone, while Climati later made the cannibal film Natura contro in 1988.

The film has gained notoriety for the inclusion of several scenes of human death. One of the scenes, in which a man is tied to two trucks that tear off his arm, is staged. The other scenes, which are genuine, include a corpse in Tibet that is hacked apart by monks and fed to vultures and the accidental deaths of tightrope walker Karl Wallenda and stuntman A. J. Bakunas.

== Release history ==
Sweet and Savage was originally released on 2 September 1983 in Italy and was later released internationally the following year. The film was released as Caramba! (カランバ) in Japan and focused heavily on the staged death scene in its advertisements.

In Australia, the film was released uncut theatrically in 1984, but an edited video release submitted to the Australian censors was banned for excessive violence. Although the film was rated M and R18+ for three different submissions in 1986, it was only ever released once on video by Roadshow's Premiere video label in 1987.

== Bibliography ==
- Goodall, Mark (2006). Sweet & Savage: The World Through the Shockumentary Film Lens. London: Headpress. ISBN 978-1-900486-49-1.
- Kerekes, David; Slater, David (1995). Killing for Culture: An Illustrated History of Death Film from Mondo to Snuff. Creation Books. ISBN 978-1-871592-20-7.
