= Antonio Climati =

- Born: Antonio Climati; 14 November 1931; Rome, Italy
- Died: 9 August 2015 (aged 83); Rome, Italy
- Occupations: Cinematographer; filmmaker; editor

Antonio Climati (14 November 1931 – 9 August 2015) was an Italian cinematographer, filmmaker and film editor.

He was best known for photographing and directing many mondo films during the 1970s and 1980s, as well as for having worked as a director of photography for many Italian horror films.

== Biography ==
Antonio, son of camera operator Arturo Climati, gained his first experience with the camera alongside his father and as an assistant to news and documentary filmmaker Paolo Gregorich. Then, he was part of the staff of Gualtiero Jacopetti and collaborated with him in the production of some of his movies as a cameraman.

During the 1970s, he started to shoot his own films in the style of Jacopetti, with occasional side trips to the pure feature film, such as Natura contro, his most recent film to date, in collaboration with Mario Morra.

== Filmography ==
=== Director ===
- Savage Man Savage Beast (1975) (also producer, editor and director of photography)
- Savana violenta (1976) (also director of photography)
- Dolce e selvaggio (1983) (also director of photography)
- Natura contro (1988) (also director of photography)

=== Director of photography ===
- Mondo Cane (1962)
- Africa Addio (1966)
- Goodbye Uncle Tom (1971)
- Primal Rage (1988)
- Nightmare Beach (1989)
