= Turbo Time =

- Italian theatrical release poster by Enzo Sciotti
- Directed by: James Davis
- Written by: Mario Morra
- Screenplay by: Federico Urban; Lello Garinei
- Produced by: Alessandro Fracassi
- Cinematography: Antonio Climati
- Edited by: Mario Morra
- Music by: Daniele Patucchi
- Production company: Racing Pictures
- Distributed by: Cinemedia
- Release date: September 29, 1983 (Italy)
- Running time: 91 minutes
- Country: Italy

Turbo Time is a 1983 Italian documentary film directed by Antonio Climati (as James Davis) and written by Mario Morra.

== Plot ==
Documentary about the world of car and motorcycle racing, accompanied by interviews with several champions of these sports.

== Release ==
The film was released in Italy on September 29, 1983.

== See also ==
- List of Italian films of 1983
