= Moving Target (1988 Italian film) =

- Theatrical release poster
- Directed by: Marius Mattei
- Written by: Marius Mattei
- Produced by: Giuseppe Colombo; Josi W. Konski; Enzo Rispoli
- Cinematography: Angelo Filippini
- Edited by: Angelo Curi
- Music by: Mike Francis
- Production companies: International Cinema Company; Laguna Productions
- Distributed by: Intra Films; South Gate Entertainment
- Release date: 1988
- Running time: 83 minutes
- Country: Italy
- Language: English

Moving Target (Italian: Bersaglio sull'autostrada) is a 1988 Italian film directed and written by Marius Mattei.

== Plot ==
Kim received from her boyfriend the key to a safety deposit box that holds the swag. Chasing the girl a motorcyclist who does not hesitate to kill anyone who obstacles, a journalist and a photographer. On their trail the police captain Morrison.

== Cast ==
- Ernest Borgnine as Captain Morrison
- Linda Blair as Sally Tyler
- Stuart Whitman as Joe Frank
- Gabriella Giorgelli as Billie Cody
- Charles Pitt as Ferry Spencer
- Janine Lindemulder as Allison Spencer
- Emy Valentino as Julia Martinez
