= Damon Fox =

Damon Fox may refer to:

- Damon Fox (writer), film writer and producer
- Damon Fox (musician), keyboardist and guitar player
