= Mondo candido =

1975 Italian black comedy film

- Directed by: Gualtiero Jacopetti, Franco Prosperi
- Screenplay by: Gualtiero Jacopetti, Franco Prosperi, Claudio Quarantotto
- Based on: Candide by Voltaire
- Produced by: Camillo Teti
- Cinematography: Giuseppe Ruzzolini
- Edited by: Franco Letti
- Music by: Riz Ortolani
- Production company: Perugia Cinematografica
- Release date: 21 February 1975
- Running time: 107 mins
- Country: Italy
- Language: Italian

Mondo candido is a 1975 Italian black comedy film by Mondo directors Gualtiero Jacopetti and Franco Prosperi. It is a liberal adaptation of Voltaire's 1759 novel Candide.

An orphan boy is raised by a baron in Westphalia. A local philosopher teaches him a purely optimistic view of the world. The baron exiles the boy when he realizes that his ward is in love with the baron's daughter. The baron and his wife are killed shortly after by outlaw bikers. The boy searches the world for his love interest, and he has first-hand experiences with the Holy Inquisition, with the Troubles in Northern Ireland, and with the Arab–Israeli conflict in Israel.

== Plot ==
Candido (Christopher Brown) is a naïve young man raised by a Westphalian baron (Gianfranco D'Angelo) in the castle of Thunder-ten-Tronckh. He is a devoted disciple of his tutor Dr. Pangloss (Jacques Herlin), a philosopher who instructs him with a purely optimistic moral doctrine. Candido cannot hide his feelings for the Baron's raunchy daughter Cunegonda (Michele Miller), and one day the Baron discovers them in intimacy. Outraged by this gesture, he punishes the girl and expels the young man from the court.

Having stumbled upon a camp of Bulgarian soldiers, the orphan is deceived and forced into useless and dangerous experiments on human flight. Candido manages to escape and, during the journey, meets Pangloss. The master informs him that the castle was attacked by a gang of motorcyclists who killed the Baron and the Baroness, and raped Cunegonda.

Later, the two are imprisoned by the Holy Inquisition. The tutor is sentenced to death for his utopian ideas, while to the boy suffers corporal punishment. Among the high-ranking people who attend the executions is Cunegonda, forced to be the lover of the head of the Tribunal. After the young lovers briefly reunite, the inquisitor arrives and, to avoid being hanged, Candido has to escape again, accompanied by his new friend Cacambo, a slave who has escaped from his master. The two embark for the New World "where all are equal".

In today's New York City, Candido finds Pangloss, who also escaped the gallows and now works as a television director. Always in search of Cunegonda, the protagonist and Cacambo travel first in Northern Ireland, devastated by the clashes between Catholics and Protestants, then in a military camp for Israeli female soldiers, during the Arab–Israeli conflict. Here, Candido learns that Cunegonda has fled with a fedayeen. After further ups and downs, the young man finally manages to reunite with his loved one.

== Cast ==
- Christopher Brown: Candido
- Jacques Herlin: Dr. Pangloss
- Michelle Miller: Cunegonda
- José Quaglio: Inquisitor
- Steffen Zacharias: Sage
- Gianfranco D'Angelo: Baron
- Salvatore Baccaro: Ogre
- Alessandro Haber: A lover of Cunegonda
- Giancarlo Badessi: Spanish governor
- Richard Domphe: Cacambò

== Reception ==
Stefano Loparco comments Mondo Candido as "a visionary work without a precise narrative structure - resembling a certain surrealist production by Alejandro Jodorowski - the film is difficult to categorise in a defined genre, nor does it aspire to be".
