= Cannibal Holocaust (disambiguation) =

Cannibal Holocaust is a 1980 film directed by Ruggero Deodato.

Cannibal Holocaust may also refer to:

- Natura contro or Cannibal Holocaust II, a 1988 film directed by Antonio Climati
- "Cannibal Holocaust", a song by Brutal Juice that was released as a single in 1992
- Cannibal Holocaust (EP), a 2001 EP by Necrophagia, or the title song
