= Mondo film =

Film genre

Mondo film is a subgenre of exploitative documentary films. Many mondo films are pseudo-documentaries and usually depict sensational topics, scenes, or situations. Common traits of mondo films include portrayals of foreign cultures (which have drawn accusations of ethnocentrism or racism), an emphasis on taboo subjects such as death and sex, and staged sequences presented as genuine documentary footage. Over time, the films have placed increasing emphasis on footage of the dead and dying (both real and fake).

The term mondo is Italian for 'world'. The term shockumentary is also used to describe the genre.

Mondo films began to soar in popularity in the 1960s with the releases of Mondo Cane (1962), Women of the World (1963) and Africa Addio (1966). The genre arguably reached its peak with Faces of Death (1978), a film that inspired myriad imitators, such as Banned from Television, Death Scenes, and the Traces of Death and Faces of Gore series.

== History ==
Although earlier films such as Alessandro Blasetti's Europe by Night (1959) and Luigi Vanzi's Il mondo di notte (World by Night, 1960) may be considered examples of the genre, the origins of the mondo documentary are generally traced to the 1962 Italian film Mondo Cane (A Dog's World—a mild Italian profanity) by Paolo Cavara, Gualtiero Jacopetti and Franco Prosperi which was a commercial success.

Documentary films imitating Mondo Cane in the 1960s often included the term mondo in their titles, even if they were in English; examples include Mondo Bizarro, Mondo Daytona, Mondo Mod, Mondo Infame and Mondo Hollywood. Films outside the genre followed suit: Mondo Trasho, Mondo Weirdo: A Trip to Paranoia Paradise, Mondo Keyhole and Mondo Brutale (a German release of Wes Craven's The Last House on the Left) title themselves mondo, although none are mondo documentaries. Later in the decade, this naming convention began to fall out of favour and fewer mondo films identified themselves as such in their titles.

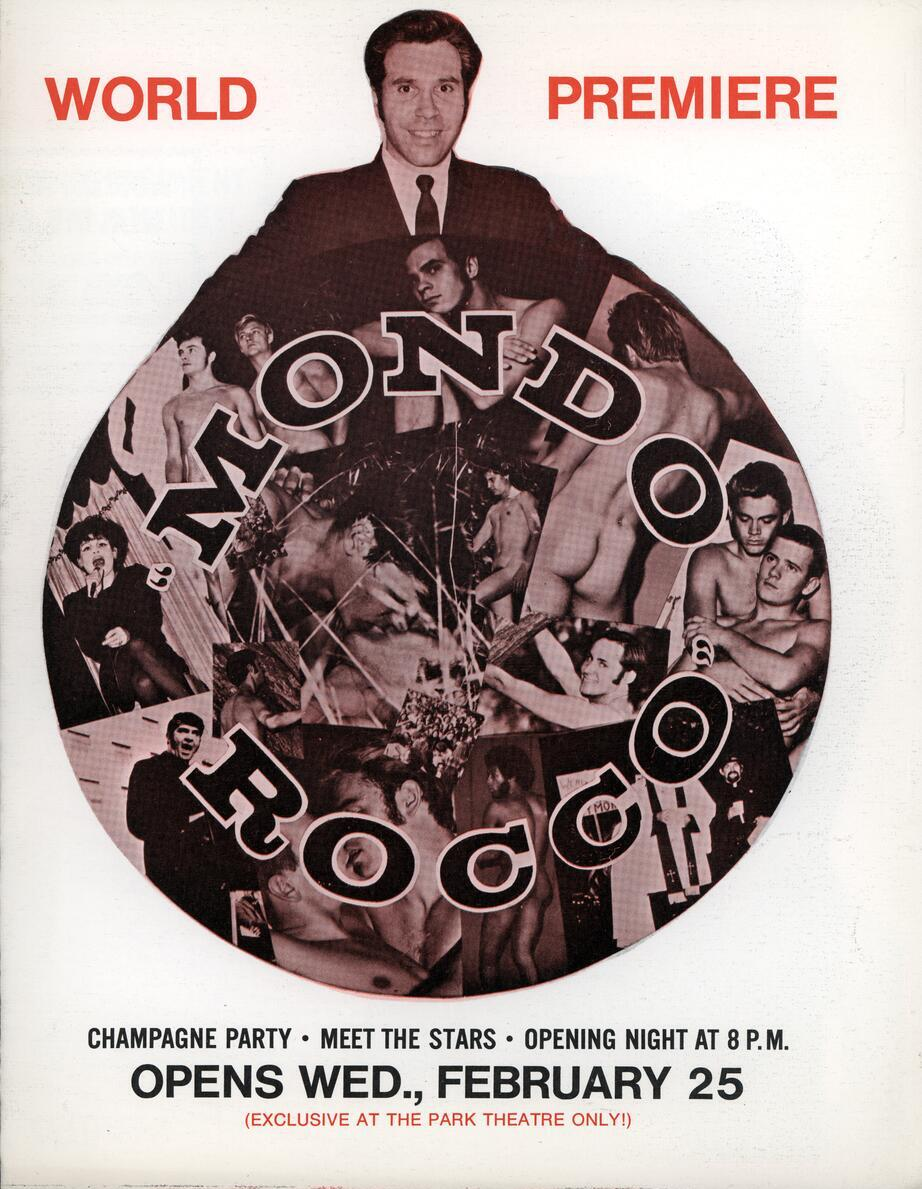
Flier for the film Mondo Rocco

Filmmakers wanted to top each other in shock value to attract audiences. Cruelty to animals, accidents, tribal-initiation rites and surgeries are features of a typical mondo. Much of the action is staged, although the filmmakers may claim their goal is to document "reality". Subjects of mondo films include sex (Mondo Sex and Mondo Sexualis USA); celebrities (Mondo Elvis and Mondo Lugosi); youth culture (Mondo Teeno) and the gay subculture (Mondo Rocco).

Russ Meyer's film Mondo Topless was one of the few "documentaries" restricted to the old midnight movie circuit in the pre-VCR era; it explored strip clubs in 1960s San Francisco, at a time when strip clubs were a novelty in the United States, restricted to centers of port-city decadence (such as San Francisco). Other examples of this genre include Mondo New York by Harvey Keith, Mondo di Notte by Gianni Proia and Mondo Balordo by Roberto Bianchi Montero.

The 1970s and 1980s saw a resurgence of mondo movies focusing almost exclusively on (onscreen) death, instead of world cultures. The Faces of Death series is a notable example of this type of mondo (or "death") movie. The producers used fake footage (passed off as real), but some of the footage was legitimate (including scenes of autopsies, suicides and accidents). The Italian cannibal film is arguably an offshoot of the mondo film.

The rare 1985 film Mondo Senza Veli (World Without Veils or Mondo Fresh) was purported by viewers to feature at its end the brutal execution of a young Arab rapist by public rectal impalement. This episode was, however, believed to have been a staged execution by some viewers.

Mondo films in the 21st century feature gore, exemplified by the Faces of Gore and Traces of Death series. There is less fake footage, and many use news footage of accidents from East Asia.

The late 2010s saw another resurgence, beginning with the Bootleg Death Tape series and Faces of Dying series from filmmaker Dustin Ferguson, which both involved various independent directors from around the world.

In 2015 a new take on the Mondo shockumentary genre came via a short film titled Cibo Di Violenza at a run time of 12 minutes, this film is listed as Cibo Di Violenza in Italian and translated as "Food of Violence" in English; both the director Bazz Hancher and co-writer Mike Lima are English.

A number of films have parodied the genre. Examples include Ricardo Fratelli's Mondo Ford, Mr. Mike's Mondo Video by Saturday Night Live's Michael O'Donoghue, and Is There Sex After Death? by Jeanne and Alan Abel. Mondo Beyondo spoofed the films' approach to titling, but was a parody of satellite television.

== Film series ==
=== Mondo Cane ===
The original mondo film series was the Mondo Cane series by Gualtiero Jacopetti, Paolo Cavara, and Franco Prosperi. When this type of film proved successful, many imitators followed.

Jacopetti and Prosperi
Title	Year	Country	Director and screenplay	Music	Uncut run time	Notes
Mondo Cane	1962	Italy	Gualtiero Jacopetti; Paolo Cavara; Franco E. Prosperi	Riz Ortolani	108 minutes	R-rated run time 85 minutes; a.k.a. A Dog's Life
La donna nel mondo	1963	Italy	Gualtiero Jacopetti; Paolo Cavara; Franco E. Prosperi	Riz Ortolani; Nino Oliviero	107 minutes	a.k.a. Women of the World
Mondo Cane 2	1963	Italy	Gualtiero Jacopetti; Franco Prosperi	Nino Oliviero	95 minutes	R-rated run time 76 minutes; a.k.a. Mondo Pazzo
Africa Addio	1966	Italy	Gualtiero Jacopetti; Franco Prosperi	Riz Ortolani	139 minutes	Unrated English version 128 minutes; R-rated version 80 minutes; a.k.a. Africa: Blood & Guts, Farewell Africa
Addio Zio Tom	1971	Italy	Gualtiero Jacopetti; Franco Prosperi	Riz Ortolani	136 minutes	Unrated English version 123 minutes; a.k.a. Goodbye Uncle Tom

The pair's Mondo candido (1975) is not a mondo film; the title was imposed on them by the studio, who wished to cash in on their earlier successes. The film is a retelling of Voltaire's novel, Candide.

In the late 1980s, Stelvio Massi (a.k.a. Max Steele) made two spin-offs of the original Mondo Cane series, known as Mondo Cane 3 and Mondo Cane 4 on video.

Max Steele
Title	Year	Country	Director and cinematography	Screenplay	Uncut run time	Notes
Mondo cane oggi - L'orrore continua	1986	Italy	Stelvio Massi	Stelvio Massi	78 minutes	a.k.a. Mondo Cane 3
Mondo cane 2000 - L'incredibile	1988	Italy	Stelvio Massi	G. Crisanti	73 minutes	a.k.a. Mondo Cane 4

=== Mondo films about Africa ===
In 1969, brothers Angelo and Alfredo Castiglioni began to make a series of their own mondo films until the early 1980s. They made five films in all, tying Jacopetti and Prosperi as the most prolific mondo film producers. Each film examines brutal and bizarre behavior on the African continent. Their films are considered some of the most graphic mondo films ever made.

Castiglioni brothers
Title	Year	Country	Directors	Music	Notes
Africa segreta	1969	Italy	Angelo Castiglioni; Alfredo Castiglioni	Angelo Francesco Lavagnino	a.k.a. Secret Africa; uncut run time 103 min
Africa ama	1971	Italy	Angelo Castiglioni; Alfredo Castiglioni	Angelo Francesco Lavagnino	a.k.a. Africa Uncensored
Magia nuda	1975	Italy	Angelo Castiglioni; Alfredo Castiglioni	Ciro Dammicco (credited as Zacar)	a.k.a. Mondo Magic
Addio ultimo uomo	1978	Italy	Angelo Castiglioni; Alfredo Castiglioni	Franco Godi	a.k.a. The Last Savage
Africa dolce e selvaggia	1982	Italy	Angelo Castiglioni; Alfredo Castiglioni	Franco Godi	a.k.a. Shocking Africa

=== Savage Trilogy ===
Antonio Climati, cinematographer to Prosperi and Jacopetti in many mondo films, joined Mario Morra in 1974 to produce their own string of mondo films, known as the "Savage Trilogy". Prosperi also produced the films. Climati and Morra were known for staging scenes.

Savage Trilogy
Title	Year	Country	Directors	Music	Notes
Ultime grida dalla savana	1975	Italy	Antonio Climati; Mario Morra	Carlo Savina	a.k.a. Savage Man Savage Beast; uncut run time 94 min
Savana violenta	1976	Italy	Antonio Climati; Mario Morra	Guido De Angelis; Maurizio De Angelis	a.k.a. This Violent World
Dolce e selvaggio	1983	Italy	Antonio Climati; Mario Morra	Daniele Patucchi	a.k.a. Sweet and Savage

=== Faces of Death ===
The 1978 Faces of Death popularized a mondo style known as "death films", which depicted humans or animals dying in graphic ways.

John Alan Schwartz
Title	Year	Director	Screenplay	Notes
The Faces of Death series	1978–1991	John Alan Schwartz	John Alan Schwartz	Four parts
The Worst of Faces of Death	1991	John Alan Schwartz	John Alan Schwartz	Compilation of first three Faces of Death films
Faces of Death: Fact or Fiction?	1999	John Alan Schwartz	John Alan Schwartz; James B. Schwartz	Documentary about Faces of Death

Uwe Schier bought the rights to the Mondo Cane and Faces of Death films and released his own entries in both series, consisting largely of footage lifted from other mondo films. Faces of Death V draws heavily on Death Scenes; Faces of Death VI consists almost entirely of Days of Fury and Mondo Cane IV (not to be confused with Mondo Cane 2000, l'Incredibile, Schier's Mondo Cane IV is in fact the fifth film in the series) lifts from other films (including Death Scenes and Death Faces IV). In 1993, Hurricane Pictures edited a mix of scenes featured in Addio ultimo uomo and Shocking Africa, labeling it the "fifth chapter" of the saga (Teil V in German).

Uwe Schier
Title	Year	Country	Notes
Mondo Cane IV	1992	Germany	
Mondo Cane teil V	1993	Germany	a.k.a. Mondo Cane 5
Faces of Death V	1995	Germany	
Faces of Death VI	1996	Germany	

Several imitators followed the Faces of Death series; many used (or were composed entirely of) footage from other mondo films.

Faces of Death imitators
Title	Year	Director	Screenplay	Music	Notes
The Death Scenes series	1989–1993	Nick Bougas	Nick Bougas; F. B. Vincinzo	Richard Gibson, Peter H. Gilmore	Three parts
The Traces of Death series	1993–2000	Damon Fox		Various	Five parts
The Banned from Television series	1998	Joe Francis		APM Music	Three parts; released in the US by Mantra Films.
The Banned! In America series	1998–2003	Nomo Ichi		Delta 9	Six parts; released in the US by Brain Damage Films.
The Faces of Gore series	1999–2000	Todd Tjersland			Three parts
Best of Faces of Gore	2000	Todd Tjersland			Compilation video

== Other mondo films (1960s – 1980) ==
Other mondo films and movies influenced by the genre were released.

Title	Year	Country	Director and cinematography	Screenplay	Uncut run time	Notes
Ecco	1963	Italy	Gianni Proia	R.W Cresse	Riz Ortolani	a.k.a. This Shocking World
Mondo nudo	1963	Italy	Francesco De Feo	Gian Carlo Fusco; Giuseppe Marotta	Teo Usuelli	a.k.a. Naked World
I tabù	1963	Italy	Romolo Marcellini	Ugo Guerra		a.k.a. Taboos of the World
Hollywood's World of Flesh	1963	United States	Lee Frost			
Mondo Infame	1963	Italy	Roberto Bianchi Montero			
London in the Raw	1964	United Kingdom	Arnold L. Miller; Norman Cohen	Arnold L. Miller		
Il pelo nel mondo	1964	Italy	Antonio Margheriti; Marco Vicario	Antonio Margheriti; Marco Vicario	Bruno Nicolai; Nino Oliviero	a.k.a. Go Go Go World, Mondo Inferno, and Weird, Wicked World
Kwaheri: Vanishing Africa	1964	United States	Thor L. Brooks; Byron Chudnow	Michael Vittes	Byron Ross	
I Malamondo	1964	Italy	Paolo Cavara	Guido Castaldo; Paolo Cavara; Ugo Gregoretti; Francesco Torti	Ennio Morricone	
Le Schiave Esistono Ancora	1964	Italy; France	Maleno Malenotti; Roberto Malenotti; Folco Quilici	Baccio Bandini; Gianfranco Calderoni; Roberto Malenotti	Teo Usuelli	a.k.a. Slave Trade in the World Today, There Are Still Slaves in the World
Mondo Balordo	1964	Italy	Roberto Bianchi Montero	Guido Castaldo; Francesco Torti	Coriolano Gori; Nino Rosso	a.k.a. A Fool's World; English version narrated by Boris Karloff
L'amore primitivo	1964	Italy	Luigi Scattini	Massimo Pupillo; Luigi Scattini	Lallo Gori	a.k.a. Primitive Love
I tabù n. 2	1965	Italy	Romolo Marcellini	Giancarlo Del Re		a.k.a. Taboos of the World 2, Macabro
Primitive London	1965	United Kingdom	Arnold Louis Miller			
The Forbidden	1966	Italy; France	Benjamin Andrews; Lee Frost	Benjamin Andrews		
Mondo Topless	1966	United States	Russ Meyer		The Aladdins	
Mondo Freudo	1966	United States	Lee Frost		Rodney Lee Bermingham; The Duvals; Chuck Morgan; Bill Wild	
Mondo Bizarro	1966	United States	Lee Frost		Lawrence Von Lattman	
The Mystery and the Pleasure	1966	United Kingdom	Edward Stewart Abraham			a.k.a. Our Incredible World
Mondo oscenità	1966	United States	Joseph P. Mawra	Ernest Franklin		a.k.a. World of Obscenity
Mondo Hollywood	1967	United States	Robert Carl Cohen		Mike Curb	
Mondo Mod	1967	United States	Peter Perry Jr.	Sherman Greene		
Teenage Rebellion	1967	United Kingdom; Italy; United States	Norman T. Herman; Jörn Donner; Jean Herman	Norman T. Herman		a.k.a. Mondo Teeno
Mondo Daytona	1968	United States	Frank Willard			
The Wild, Wild World of Jayne Mansfield	1968	United States; France; West Germany	Charles W. Broun, Jr.; Joel Holt; Arthur Knight	Charles Ross		
Sweden: Heaven and Hell	1968	Italy	Luigi Scattini		Piero Umiliani	
Witchcraft '70	1969	Italy	Luigi Scattini; Lee Frost	Alberto Bevilacqua; Luigi Scattini		
L'altra faccia del peccato	1969	Italy	Marcello Avallone	Giacinto Ciaccio; Massimo D'Avak	Peppino De Luca	a.k.a. The Queer, the Erotic
Mille peccati... nessuna virtù	1969	Italy	Sergio Martino		Peppino De Luca	a.k.a. Mondo Sex
Inghilterra nuda	1969	Italy	Vittorio De Sisti	Pino De Martino; Ettore Mattia	Piero Piccioni	a.k.a. Naked England
America così nuda, così violenta	1970	Italy	Sergio Martino	Luciano Martino	Bruno Nicolai	a.k.a. Naked and Violent
Dove non è peccato	1970	Italy	Antonio Colantuoni	Antonio Colantuoni; Augusto Marcelli	Piero Umiliani	a.k.a. Tämä on Suomi (This is Finland)
Is There Sex After Death?	1971	United States	Alan Abel; Jeanne Abel	Alan Abel; Jeanne Abel; Buck Henry		
Questo sporco mondo meraviglioso	1971	Italy	Mino Loy; Luigi Scattini			a.k.a. Mondo Cane 2000
Shocking Asia	1974	West Germany	Rolf Olsen	Rolf Olsen; Ingeborg Stein Steinbach	Erwin Halletz	Uncut run time 94 min.
Journey Into the Beyond	1975	West Germany	Rolf Olsen	Paul Ross	Don Great	
Australia After Dark	1975	Australia	John D. Lamond			
Notti Porno nel Mondo	1977	Italy	Bruno Mattei		Gianni Marchetti	a.k.a. Mondo Erotica
This Is America	1977	United States	Romano Vanderbes		Emmanuel Vardi	a.k.a. Crazy Ridiculous American People (UK), Candid America, Jabberwalk, Shocking America
Brutes and Savages	1978	United States	Arthur Davis	Jenny Craven	Riz Ortolani	
Mr. Mike's Mondo Video	1979	United States	Michael O'Donoghue	Mitch Glazer	Paul Shaffer	
This Is America Part 2	1980	United States	Romano Vanderbes	Bill Milling	Emmanuel Vardi	
Days of Fury	1980	United States	Fred Warshofsky			a.k.a. Doomsday

== Other mondo films (1981 – 2000) ==
Title	Year	Country	Director and cinematography	Screenplay	Uncut run time	Notes
Des Morts	1981	France; Belgium	Jean-Pol Ferbus; Dominique Garny; Thierry Zéno		Alain Pierre	a.k.a. Of the Dead; uncut run time 105 min.
Great White Death	1981	Canada; United States	Jean-Patrick Lebel		Jean Sauvageau	a.k.a. Sharks! Pirates of the Deep
The Killing of America	1982	United States; Japan	Sheldon Renan; Leonard Schrader	Chieko Schrader; Leonard Schrader	W. Michael Lewis; Mark Lindsay	a.k.a. Violence U.S.A. in Japan; uncut run time 90 min.
The Silent Scream	1983	USA	Bernard Nathanson			Film about the abortions.
Dimensione Violenza	1983	Italy	Mario Morra	Mario Morra; Willy Molco; Emilio Ugoletti		a.k.a. Savage Zone
Manson Family Movies	1983	United States	John Aes-Nihil		88 minutes	
Nudo e crudele	1984	Italy	Bitto Albertini	Bitto Albertini; Maurizio Mannino; Vincenzo Mannino	Nico Fidenco	a.k.a. Naked and Cruel
Shocking Asia II: The Last Taboos	1985	West Germany	Rolf Olsen		Erwin Halletz	
Love duro e violento	1985	Italy	Claudio Racca			
Mondo senza veli	1985	Italy	Adalberto Albertini			
Bebukottak (Hungarian slang word, meaning approximately "they failed")	1985	Hungary	András Monory Mész			
Forest of Bliss	1986	England	Robert Gardner, Ákos Östör			It is actually an ethnographic film, but it deals exclusively with the cremation customs of Benares (which seem shocking in Western culture).
Noi e l'amore - comportamento sessuale variante	1986	Italy	Antonio D’Agostino			
Droga sterco di Dio	1987	Italy	Stelvio Massi			
I vizi segreti degli italiani quando credono di non essere visti	1987	Italy	Camillo Teti			
True Gore	1987	United States	M. Dixon Causey		Monte Cazazza; The Atom Smashers	
Faces of Torture	1988	United States	Mark David Decker; Beverly Hagan; Dave Jenkins	Larry Fox		
Death Faces	1988	United Kingdom	Countess Victoria Bloodhart; Steve White	S. Sebastian Shock		a.k.a. Death Faces IV, Dying: Last Seconds of Life, Beyond Reality
Dying: Last Seconds of Life, Part II	1988	United Kingdom	Steve White			a.k.a. Beyond Reality 2
Mondo New York	1988	United States	Harvey Keith	Harvey Keith; David Silver	Luis Perico Ortiz	Uncut run time 83 min.
Death in Focus	1989	United States	Elvis Boorman			
Empire of Madness	1989	United States	M. Dixon Causey			a.k.a. True Gore II
Inhumanities	1989	United States	Harvey Keith			
Inhumanities II: Modern Atrocities	1989	United States	Wesley Emerson	Anthony R. Lovett		
Death File	1989	Japan	Susumu Saegusa			
Death File 2	1989	Japan	Susumu Saegusa			
Death File 3	1989	Japan	Susumu Saegusa			
Death File 4	1990	Japan	Susumu Saegusa			
Death File 5	1991	Japan	Susumu Saegusa			
America Exposed	1991	United States	Romano Vanderbes			a.k.a. Shocking America 2
New Death File: Fetal Scream	1991	Japan	Susumu Saegusa			
Death File: Special Edition - Mediums and the Dead	1992	Japan	Susumu Saegusa			
New Death File II	1992	Japan	Susumu Saegusa			
Engineering Red	1993	United States; Russia	Andrey Yi			
New Death File III	1993	Japan	Susumu Saegusa			
Death File: Summary	1994	Japan	Susumu Saegusa			
Death File: Red	1994	Japan	Susumu Saegusa			
Death File: Yellow	1994	Japan	Susumu Saegusa			
Death File: Black	1994	Japan	Susumu Saegusa			
Executions	1995	United Kingdom	David Herman; Arun Kumar; David Monaghan	David Herman; David Monaghan		
Executions II	1995	United States	David Herman			
Shocking Asia III: After Dark	1995	Hong Kong; Japan	Sung-Jiu Kang; Takafumi Nagamine			
Death File: Buster - Murders & Executions	1995	Japan	Susumu Saegusa			
Facez of Death 2000	1996	United States	Lorenzo Munoz Jr.			a.k.a. Faces of Death: The Millennium
Facez of Death 2000: Part Two	1996	Germany	Lorenzo Munoz Jr.			a.k.a. Facez of Death Vol. 2: Dead in Asia
The Ultimate Death Experience	1996	United States	Lorenzo Munoz Jr.			
You Gotta See This!	1996	United States	J. Rupert Thompson	Bruce Nash; Scooter Pietsch		
Paramedics	1997	United States	Lorenzo Munoz Jr.			
Paramedics II	1997	United States	Lorenzo Munoz Jr.			
Shock-X-Treme Vol. 1: Snuff Video	1997	United States	Gordon Vein			
Absolute Punishment: The Ultimate Death Experience Part 2	1998	United States	1312; Skelter			
Facez of Death 2000: Part Three	1998	United States	Lorenzo Munoz Jr.			
The Amazing Shocking Asia	1998	United States	Gordon Vein			a.k.a. Banned from Asia
Facez of Death 2000: Part Four	2000	United States	Lorenzo Munoz Jr.			

== Other mondo films (2001 – 2020) ==
Title	Year	Country	Director and cinematography	Screenplay	Uncut run time	Notes
Autopsy: Through the Eyes of Death's Detectives	2001	United States	Michael Kriegsman			
Orozco the Embalmer	2001	Colombia; Japan	Kiyotaka Tsurisaki			
Mondo Ford	2001	United States	Ricardo Fratelli	Scott Calonico; Ricardo Fratelli		
Bumfights Vol. 1: A Cause for Concern	2002	United States	Ryen McPherson			
Bumfights Vol. 2: Bumlife	2003	United States	Ryen McPherson			
Bumfights Vol. 3: The Felony Footage	2004	United States	Ryen McPherson			
Body Shock (series)	2003-2014	United Kingdom				
Man VS Man	2004	Italy	Davide Lingua; Giuseppe Vercellotti			
Hood 2 Hood: The Blockumentary	2005	United States	Aquis Bryant			
Terrorists, Killers & Middle-East Wackos	2005	United States	Ryen McPherson			
Bumfights Vol. 4: Return of Ruckus	2006	United States	Ryen McPherson			
Shock-X-Treme Vol. 2: Death.com	2006	United States	Lorenzo Munoz Jr.			
Shock-X-Treme Vol. 3: Gangs of Death	2006	United States	Lorenzo Munoz Jr.			
Junk Films	2008	Japan	Kiyotaka Tsurisaki			
Criminals Gone Wild	2008	United States	Ousala Aleem			
My Shocking Story (series)	2008	United Kingdom				
Hood 2 Hood: The Blockumentary Part II	2008	United States	Aquis Bryant			
Murder Collection V.1	2009	United States	Fred Vogel	Don Moore; Fred Vogel; Shelby Vogel; Jerami Cruise		
Mondo Sexxxx: The Terry Kobrah Story	2011	United States	Logan Myers			
Mondo Delirium	2011	Italy	Flavio Sciolè			Uncut run time 170 min.
Made in Italy	2012	Italy	Jephta			
Registros Fatais	2012	Brazil	Lázaro Hahn			a.k.a. Fatal Records
Registros Fatais 2: Extreme!	2012	Brazil	Lázaro Hahn			a.k.a. Fatal Records 2: Extreme!
Shock-X-Treme Vol. 4: Real Fights	2012	United States	Lorenzo Munoz Jr.			
Mondomanila	2012	Philippines	Khavn			
Bootleg Death Tape	2012	United States	Dustin Ferguson			
Registros Fatais 3: Apocalypse	2012	Brazil	Lázaro Hahn			a.k.a. Fatal Records 3: Apocalypse
Most Disturbed Person On Planet Earth	2013	United States	Thomas Extreme Cinemagore			
Hood 2 Hood: The Blockumentary Part III	2013	United States	Aquis Bryant			
Stream of Love	2013	Hungary	Ágnes Sós			
Most Disturbed Person On Planet Earth 2	2014	United States	Thomas Extreme Cinemagore			
Cain's children	2014	Hungary	Marcell Gerő			
Occult Holocaust	2014	United States	Dustin Ferguson			a.k.a. Occult Predator
Faces of Dying	2015	United States	Dustin Ferguson			
Cibo Di Violenza	2015	United Kingdom	Bazz Hancher			
About Taboos, Without Taboos	2016	Hungary	Szabolcs Thuróczy			
Mondo Shock	2016	United States	Dustin Ferguson			
Faces of Snuff	2016	United States	Various	Various		
Mondo CANEvese	2016	Italy	Davide Lingua; Pasquale Vigilante			
At the shadow of the tower	2017	Italy	Davide Lingua; Luigi D'Alessandro; Fabio Tosa			
Heart of Africa	2018	Italy	Davide Lingua; Pasquale Vigilante			
America: Land of the Freeks	2018	Germany; United States	Ulli Lommel			
Criminals Gone Wild 2: Menace II Humanity	2018	United States	Ousala Aleem			
Shocking Asia	2018	Hong Kong	C. Spencer Yeh			It is not the same as Rolf Olsen's 1974 mondo film of the same title (see above in the list).
4 faces of Indonesia	2018	Hungary				
Most Disturbed Person On Planet Earth III	2019	United States	Thomas Extreme Cinemagore			
HollyWEIRD	2020	United States	Dustin Ferguson			
Bootleg Death Tape II	2020	United States	Dustin Ferguson			
Bootleg Death Tape III	2020	United States	Dustin Ferguson			

== Other mondo films (2021 – ) ==
Title	Year	Country	Director and cinematography	Screenplay	Uncut run time	Notes
Faces of Dying II	2021	United States	Dustin Ferguson			
Faces of Dying III: The Final Assault	2021	United States	Dustin Ferguson			
Mondo Shock 2	2021	United States	Dustin Ferguson			

== See also ==
- Snuff film
- Goona-goona epic
- Pseudo-documentary

== Bibliography ==
- RE/Search No. 10: Incredibly Strange Films: A Guide to Deviant Films. RE/Search Publications 1986, ISBN 0-940642-09-3
- Brottman, Mikita: Mondo Horror. Carnivalizing the Taboo. In: Prince, Stephen (ed.) 2004: The horror film. S. 167–188. New Brunswick: Rutgers University Press. ISBN 0813533635.
- Goodall, Mark 2006: Sweet & Savage. The World Through the Shockumentary Film Lens. London: Headpress. ISBN 978-1900486491. (the standard work on the mondo and cannibal genre)
- Goodall, Mark 2006: Shockumentary Evidence. The perverse politics of the Mondo film. In: Dennison, Stephanie (Hg.) 2006: Remapping world cinema. Identity, culture and politics in film. S. 118–128. London: Wallflower. ISBN 978-1904764625.
- Kerekes, David; Slater, David 2006: Killing for culture. Death film from Shockumentaries to snuff. Manchester: Headpress. ISBN 1900486636.
- Stefano Loparco, 'Gualtiero Jacopetti - Graffi sul mondo'. The first complete biography dedicated to the co-director of 'Mondo cane'. Il Foglio Letterario, 2014 - ISBN 9788876064760
- Shipka, Danny 2011: Perverse titillation. The exploitation cinema of Italy, Spain and France, 1960-1980. Jefferson: Mcfarland. ISBN 978-0786448883.
