= Wild Beasts (film) =

1984 Italian horror film by Franco E. Prosperi

- Film poster
- Italian: Wild beasts - Belve feroci
- Directed by: Franco E. Prosperi
- Written by: Franco E. Prosperi
- Produced by: Frederico Prosperi
- Starring: Lorraine De Selle; Antonio Di Leo; Ugo Bologna; Louisa Lloyd
- Cinematography: Guglielmo Mancori
- Edited by: Mario Morra
- Music by: Daniele Patucchi
- Production company: Shumba International Corporation
- Distributed by: Shumba International Corporation
- Release dates: February 15, 1984 (Italy); February 20, 1984 (USA)
- Running time: 92 minutes
- Country: Italy
- Language: English

Wild Beasts (Italian: Wild beasts - Belve feroci), also known as The Wild Beasts, is a 1984 English-language Italian horror film written and directed by Franco E. Prosperi and starring Lorraine De Selle.

== Plot ==
The animals of the Frankfurt zoo become violent and dangerous when they drink water contaminated with Phencyclidine. They escape into the city and cause chaos.

== Cast ==
- Lorraine De Selle as Laura Schwarz
- Antonio Di Leo as Rupert Berner
- Ugo Bologna as Inspector Nat Braun
- Louisa Lloyd as Suzy Schwarz

== Release ==
=== Reception ===
Mike Massie from "Gone With The Twins" gave the film 4 out of 10 stars, stating: "The acting is mediocre, the dialogue is unconvincing, the characters are flimsy, and the story is shoddily constructed, but the tone is mostly serious, which helps counter the abundance of deficiencies in filmmaking techniques (and all of the unintentional hilarity)". James Jay Edwards writing for the website "Film Fracture" called the movie "over-the-top exploitation", saying: "As a movie, it’s a silly and amateurish affair, lit just a bit too darkly to completely see everything and full of actors who don’t seem to know quite how to deliver the corny dialogue". Kevin Matthews from "FlickFeast", wrote: "Wild Beasts is not hailed as a classic, and most likely it never will be, but it’s actually a lot of fun while it’s on and never dull, unlike some other entries in this particular sub-genre".

Wild Beasts was nominated for the "Grand Prize" at the 1984 Avoriaz International Fantastic Film Festival.

=== Home media ===
Severin Films restored and released the film on Blu-ray in 2025, followed with a 4K release in 2026
