= Agostina Belli =

Italian actress (born 1947)

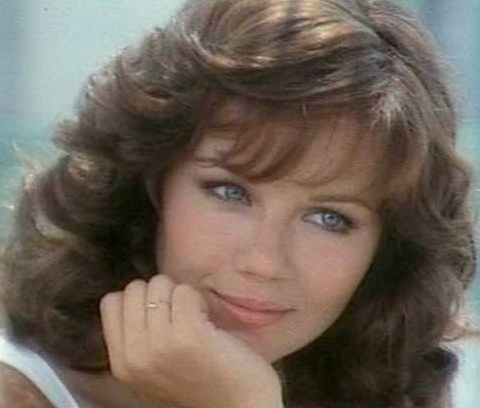
- Belli in the movie Scent of a Woman (1974)
- Born: Agostina Maria Magnoni; 13 April 1947 (age 79); Milan, Italy
- Occupation: Actress
- Years active: 1968–present

Agostina Maria Magnoni (born 13 April 1947), known as Agostina Belli, is an Italian actress. She has appeared in more than 50 films since 1968.

== Life and career ==
Born in Milan as Agostina Maria Magnoni, Belli made her debut in 1968 with a minor part in Bandits in Milan, then appeared in supporting roles in several musicarelli, giallo films and horror of Spanish-Italian co-production. She had her first role of weight in Lina Wertmüller's The Seduction of Mimi, then she was chosen by Dino Risi as the beautiful Sara in Scent of a Woman, for which she won a Grolla d'oro, and the ingenuous Marcella of The Career of a Chambermaid, for which she received a special David di Donatello. In the 1970s, Belli enjoyed a period of strong popularity performing in small productions and comedies of somewhat dubious value, but of great commercial success, from the 1980s onwards, she reduced the quantity of her appearances.

She was married to actor Fred Robsahm.

== Selected filmography ==
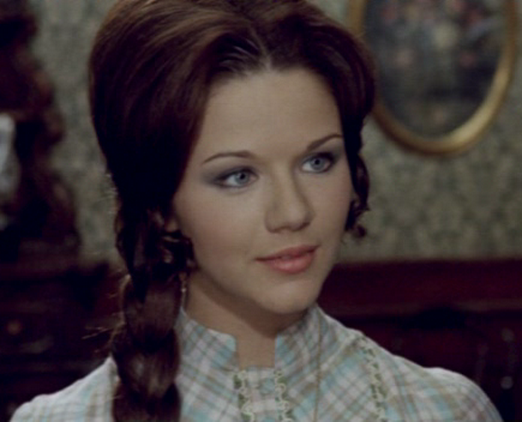
Belli in Angeli senza paradiso (1970)

- Bandits in Milan (1968) - Ragazza in ostaggio
- Il terribile ispettore (1969) - Giorgina Lorenzi
- Cran d'arrêt (1970) - Mara
- Formula 1 - Nell'Inferno del Grand Prix (1970) - Lisa
- Angeli senza paradiso (1970) - Marta
- Scream of the Demon Lover (1970) - Cristiana
- Ma che musica maestro (1971) - Giulietta Ciova
- Faccia da schiaffi (1971)
- The Fifth Cord (1971) - Giulia Soavi
- The Seduction of Mimi (1972) - Rosalia Capuzzo in Mardocheo
- The Eroticist (1972) - Sister Brunhilde
- The Night of the Devils (1972) - Sdenka
- Bluebeard (1972) - Caroline
- La calandria (1972) - Fulvia - wife of Calandro
- I Kiss the Hand (1973) - Mariuccia Ferrante
- Revolver (1973) - Anna Cipriani
- Woman Buried Alive (1973) - Christine
- The Last Snows of Spring (1973) - Veronica
- When Love Is Lust (1973)
- La governante (1974) - Jana
- Virility (1974) - Cettina
- Il figlio della sepolta viva (1974) - Christine (uncredited)
- Ante Up (1974) - Ines
- Scent of a Woman - Profumo di donna (1974) - Sara
- Il lumacone (1974) - Elisa
- Playing with Fire (1975) - Maria, la servande des Saxe
- The Sex Machine (1975) - Francesca De Renzi
- Due cuori, una cappella (1975) - Claudia Giliberti
- The Career of a Chambermaid (1976) - Marcella Valmarin aka Alba Doris
- The Big Operator (1976) - Amandine
- Cara sposa (1977) - Adelina
- The Purple Taxi (1977) - Anne Taubelman
- Holocaust 2000 (1977) - Sara Golan
- Double Murder (1977) - Teresa Colasanti
- Enfantasme (1978) - Claudia Lanza
- Manaos (1979) - Claudia
- La guérilléra (1982) - Caterina
- Vai avanti tu che mi vien da ridere (1982) - Andrea Maria Ritter
- A Strange Passion (1984) - Zaveria
- Torna (1984) - Angela
- Una donna da scoprire (1987) - Michela
- Soldati - 365 all'alba (1987) - Anna Fili
- Happy end (1989)
- L'urlo della verità (1992) - Roberto's mother, Elli (uncredited)
- One Out of Two (2006) - Elena, Tresy's mother
- Amore che vieni, amore che vai (2008) - Lina - madre di Carlo
