= Target (1979 film) =

- Directed by: Guido Zurli
- Written by: Ettore Sanzò; Giampaolo Spagnesi; Guido Zurli
- Produced by: Giuseppe Colombo; Türker İnanoğlu
- Starring: Luc Merenda
- Cinematography: Cristiano Pogany
- Edited by: Giancarlo Venarucci
- Music by: Stelvio Cipriani
- Distributed by: Erler Film, Intercine
- Release date: 1979
- Running time: 89 minutes
- Countries: Turkey, Italy
- Languages: Italian, Turkish

Target (Italian: Bersaglio altezza uomo, Turkish: Hedef) is a 1979 Italian-Turkish "poliziottesco" film written and directed by Guido Zurli and starring Luc Merenda.

== Cast ==
- Luc Merenda as Inspector Keaton (in Turkish version as Kemal)
- Gabriella Giorgelli as Jasmine
- Kadir İnanır as Cengiz
- Paola Senatore as Ahmed lover
- Pamela Villoresi as Gengis’ wife
- Giuseppe Colombo as Head of the criminal gang
- Tanju Gürsu as Şinasi
- Kayhan Yıldızoğlu as Ahmet
