= Virilità =

1974 film by Paolo Cavara

- Directed by: Paolo Cavara
- Written by: Giovanni Simonelli; Gian Paolo Callegari
- Produced by: Carlo Ponti
- Starring: Turi Ferro; Agostina Belli
- Cinematography: Claudio Cirillo
- Edited by: Mario Morra
- Music by: Daniele Patucchi
- Release date: 1974
- Language: Italian

Virilità (Virility) is a 1974 Italian film comedy directed by Paolo Cavara.

The film was a commercial success, grossing 1 billion and 261 millions lire at the Italian box office.

== Cast ==
- Turi Ferro: Vito La Casella
- Agostina Belli: Cettina
- Marc Porel: Roberto La Casella
- Tuccio Musumeci: Lawyer Fisichella
- Anna Bonaiuto: Lucia
- Geraldine Hooper: Pat
- Attilio Dottesio: Dream Judge
