= Cara sposa =

1977 film

- Directed by: Pasquale Festa Campanile
- Produced by: Titanus
- Cinematography: Giuseppe Ruzzolini
- Edited by: Mario Morra
- Music by: Stelvio Cipriani; Daniele Patucchi
- Release date: 1977
- Country: Italy
- Language: Italian

Cara sposa (Dear Wife) is a 1977 Italian comedy film directed by Pasquale Festa Campanile.

== Plot ==
Alfredo, jailed for theft and fraud, after having served the sentence discovers that his wife Adelina no longer wishes to live with him.

== Cast ==
- Johnny Dorelli : Alfredo
- Agostina Belli : Adelina
- Mario Pilar : Giovannino
- Lina Volonghi : Rosa Balestra
- Enzo Cannavale : Salomone
- Pina Cei : Elvira
- Carlo Bagno : Elvira's companion

== See also ==
- List of Italian films of 1977
