= Sergio Stivaletti =

Italian special effects and make-up artist (born 1957)

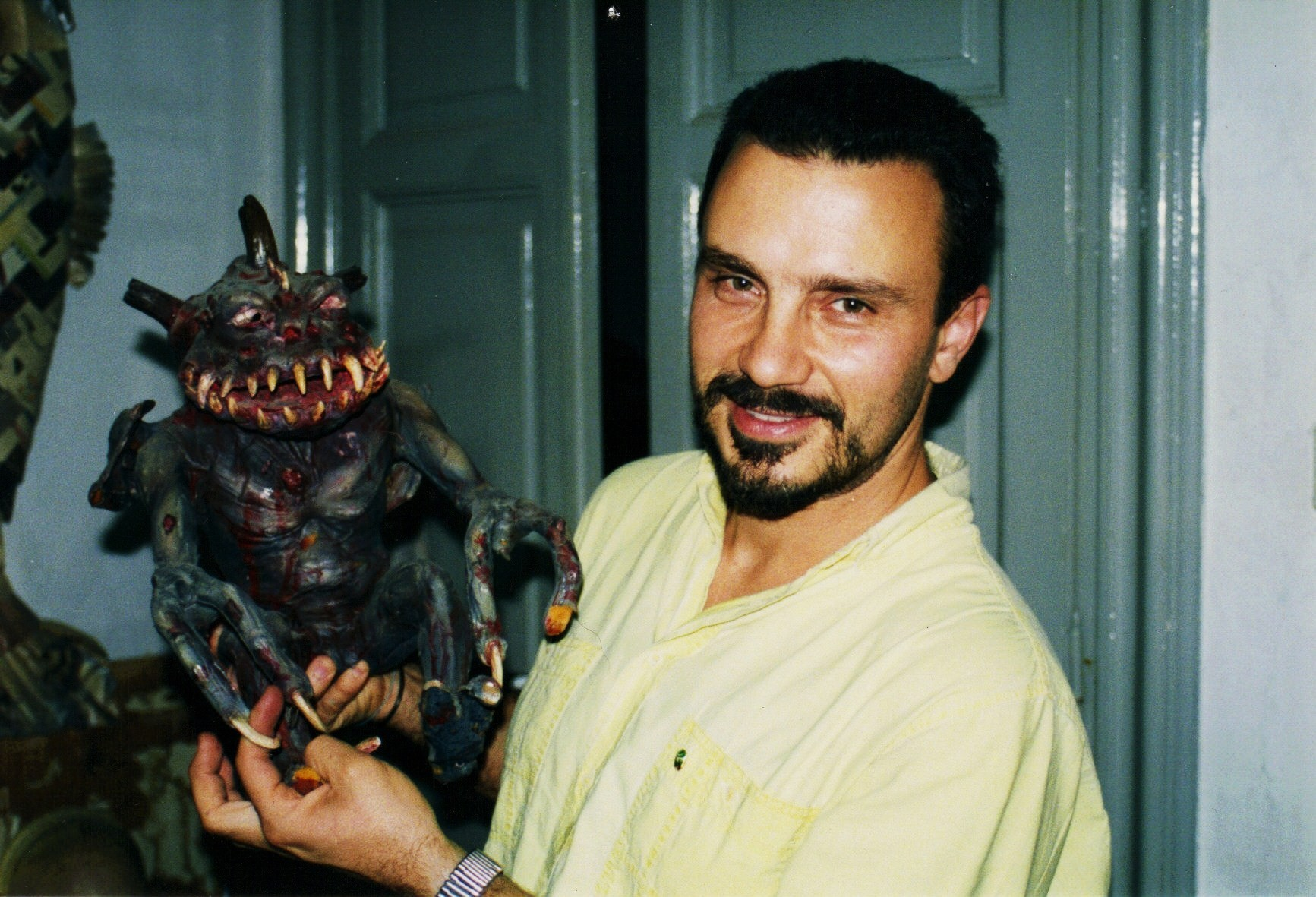
- Stivaletti in 1996
- Born: 15 March 1957 (age 68); Rome, Italy
- Occupation: Special effects artist

Sergio Stivaletti (born 15 March 1957) is an Italian special effects artist, make-up artist, director and screenwriter.

== Life and career ==
Born in Rome, while being a student of medicine at the Sapienza University Stivaletti entered the film industry as an uncredited builder of small props in some Pupi Avati films. He got his first credit as special effects artist in Riccardo Freda's Murder Obsession. In 1985, he began a long professional association with Dario Argento, handling special effects and make-up in Phenomena. He is also a frequent collaborator of Michele Soavi and Lamberto Bava both in their film and television projects, and also worked in films by Matteo Garrone, Gabriele Salvatores, Sergio Castellitto and Julie Taymor.

In 1997, Stivaletti debuted as director with Wax Mask, replacing original director Lucio Fulci who had died during the pre-production phase.

== Selected filmography ==
Title	Year	Credited as			Notes	Ref(s)
Title	Year	Special effects	Make-up	Other	Notes	Ref(s)
Murder Obsession	1981	Yes				
The Scorpion with Two Tails	1982	Yes				
Phenomena	1985	Yes				
Demons	1985	Yes				
Demons 2	1985	Yes		Yes	Uncredited screenwriter and story author	
Specters	1987	Yes				
The Spider Labyrinth	1988	Yes				
The Church	1989	Yes				
Wax Mask	1997	Yes		Yes	Director	
Dracula 3D	2012	Yes	Yes			
Dark Glasses	2022	Yes				
