= Great White Death =

- DVD cover
- Directed by: Jean-Patrick Lebel
- Starring: Glenn Ford
- Music by: Jean Sauvageau
- Production company: Megalodon Productions
- Distributed by: Troma Entertainment
- Release date: 1981
- Running time: 88 minutes
- Countries: Canada; United States
- Language: English

Great White Death is a 1981 documentary/mondo film about great white sharks narrated by Glenn Ford. The film is notable for its Faces of Death-like footage of actual shark attacks. The film shows Henri Bource, a scuba diver who survived a shark attack in November 1964.
