= Giuseppe Colombo (producer) =

Italian film producer (1948–2025)

- Born: 10 August 1948; Novara, Italy
- Died: 4 October 2025 (aged 77); Rome, Italy
- Occupation: Film producer

Giuseppe Colombo (10 August 1948 – 4 October 2025) was an Italian film producer.

== Life and career ==
Born in Novara on 10 August 1948, Colombo made his film debut in the 1970s as an actor. He notably appeared in the telefilm Cartesius, directed by Roberto Rossellini. He directed distribution in Italy for the film The Enigma of Kaspar Hauser, directed by Werner Herzog, which won the Grand Prix at the 1975 Cannes Film Festival. In the 1980s, he was commercial director for Cannon Italia, distributing numerous American and Australian films.

In 1978, Colombo produced his first film, Target. His other subsequent films include The Beekeeper, The Stendhal Syndrome, Wax Mask, and The Phantom of the Opera. In 1994, he produced the RAI miniseries A che punto è la notte, directed by Nanni Loy. He went on to become a member of the Accademia del Cinema Italiano. He was married to Gabriella Giorgelli.

Colombo died in Rome on 4 October 2025, at the age of 77.
