= Il lumacone =

1974 film

- Directed by: Paolo Cavara
- Written by: Ruggero Maccari; Paolo Cavara
- Starring: Turi Ferro; Agostina Belli; Ninetto Davoli
- Cinematography: Arturo Zavattini
- Edited by: Antonio Siciliano
- Music by: Daniele Patucchi
- Release date: December 21, 1974
- Language: Italian

Il lumacone (The Big Snail) is a 1974 Italian comedy-drama film directed by Paolo Cavara.

== Cast ==
- Turi Ferro as Gianni Rodinò
- Agostina Belli as Elisa
- Ninetto Davoli as Ginetto
- Francesco Mulè as Pietro
- Gabriella Giorgelli as Paola
- Isa Danieli as Carmela
- Fioretta Mari as Teresa
- Liù Bosisio as The lodger
- Franca Alma Moretti as Giorgina
- Tuccio Musumeci as The usher
- Gianfranco Barra as The doorman
- Giorgio Bixio as Don Mauro
- Franco Bracardi as Giorgina's client
