= Deaf Smith & Johnny Ears =

1972 film by Paolo Cavara

- U.S. film poster
- Directed by: Paolo Cavara
- Written by: Oscar Saul; Harry Essex
- Produced by: Joseph Janni; Luciano Perugia
- Starring: Anthony Quinn; Franco Nero; Pamela Tiffin; Ira von Fürstenberg
- Cinematography: Tonino Delli Colli
- Edited by: Mario Morra
- Music by: Daniele Patucchi
- Production companies: Compagnia Cinematografica Prima; Co. Film
- Distributed by: Metro-Goldwyn-Mayer
- Release date: 29 March 1973
- Running time: 91 minutes
- Country: Italy
- Languages: Italian; English
- Budget: $1.2 million

Deaf Smith & Johnny Ears, also known as Los Amigos, is a 1973 Spaghetti Western film starring Anthony Quinn and Franco Nero. The film is loosely based on the life of Deaf Smith, with direction by Paolo Cavara.

== Plot ==
The Republic of Texas has just gained its independence from Mexico. President Sam Houston sends Erastus "Deaf" Smith, a deaf-mute, and his partner Johnny Ears to stop General Morton's plot against the annexation of Texas by the U.S.

Their contact, a man named McDonald, and most of his family have been murdered by Morton and his men before they arrive. Hester, McDonald's surviving daughter, is married to Morton, and when Smith convinces her of the truth, she helps them overhear a German diplomat promise Morton a supply of weapons.

They have a saloon fight with Morton's gang. Johnny recognizes Suzie Q, a prostitute in a brothel, whom he had seen bathing in a river. Deaf pays so that his partner can spend a night with her. Johnny gets jealous of her other customers, but when she suggests they leave together using her money, he says that Deaf needs him; however, he later refuses to continue with the mission because he is in love.

Stealing dynamite from Morton's fort, Deaf almost is given away by the bells on a prostitute's garter, a gift he had kept in his pocket and forgotten. He is pursued into a cave by three men, killing one of them in a sneak attack by throwing his knife. As he comes from the cave, he sees the corpses of the other two men, killed by Johnny. Deaf gestures in jest that Johnny still owes him a punch.

They set a trap with explosives to blow up the German's weapons transport, but stop the explosion when they see children playing near the wagon train. Instead, they infiltrate Morton's fort and kill his men with explosives and a machine gun that Deaf can handle because he read the lips of the instructor. Johnny gives his gun to Morton for a shoot out with Deaf. Morton is killed.

Susie leaves with Johnny and Deaf. The next morning, Deaf is gone, having left Johnny his watch. Johnny cries out his name.

== Cast ==
- Franco Nero as Johnny Ears
- Anthony Quinn as Erastus 'Deaf' Smith
- Pamela Tiffin as Susie
- Ira von Fürstenberg as Hester McDonald Morton
- Adolfo Lastretti as Williams
- Franco Graziosi as General Lucius Morton
- Antonino Faà di Bruno as Senator
- Renato Romano as J.M. Hoffman
- Francesca Benedetti as Miss Porter
- Cristina Airoldi as Rosita McDonald
- Romano Puppo as Bull
- Franca Sciutto as Bess
- Enrico Casadei as Barrett
- Luciano Rossi as Moss
- Tom Felleghy as Von Mittler

== Production ==
The original screenplay was first optioned in 1968 by Sinatra Enterprises as a possible project for Frank Sinatra in the role of Deaf Smith. Both Franco Nero and Anthony Quinn were interested in playing the role of Deaf Smith, and after a month of negotiations they settled the matter with a coin toss, with Quinn winning the part. Quinn later noted: "If every actor could play a deaf- mute once it would be the best thing that could happen to him. I had to react to everything and everyone around me. It was a terrific experience".

Director Paolo Cavara did not consider the film a spaghetti Western, instead calling it a "psychological western". He used a portable 35mm Arriflex camera.

Principal photography started in October 1972, with the film being shot between the Elios Studios in Rome and various locations in Southern Italy, especially Calabria. It had a $1.2 million budget.

== Reception ==
In his investigation of narrative structures in Spaghetti Western films, Fridlund discusses this film as a variation of the plot about partners that was used in many Spaghetti Westerns following the success of For a Few Dollars More. In contrast to the latter story, where the bounty hunter partners initially have a fight and one is revealed to have a secret motive of vengeance, the two protagonists of Deaf Smith & Johnny Ears form a steady bond from the beginning. Johnny acquires a secondary motive—a love interest—and their partnership is peacefully dissolved in the end. It is a story that concentrates on the problems of heroes and the methods they employ to reach their goals, especially the conditions arising from Smith's deafness.

== See also ==
- List of films featuring the deaf and hard of hearing
