= Mario Morra =

Italian film editor, director and screenwriter (1935–2024)

- Born: 1935; Rome, Kingdom of Italy
- Died: October 2024 (aged 89)
- Occupations: Film editor, director, screenwriter
- Notable work: Cinema Paradiso

Mario Morra (1935 – October 2024) was an Italian film editor, director and screenwriter.

== Life and career ==
Born in Rome, Morra began working as an assistant editor in the early 1960s, and made his debut as a film editor in 1964. He gradually established himself as one of the most representative of his profession, very active in art films as well as in less ambitious works. In 1990 he was nominated to BAFTA Award for Best Editing for Giuseppe Tornatore's Cinema Paradiso.

In the 1970s and 1980s, Morra was also director or writer of several successful documentaries and Mondo films, often in collaboration with Antonio Climati, notably Turbo Time, a documentary about the world of car and motorcycle racing.

Morra died in October 2024, at the age of 89.

At the 97th Academy Awards, his name was mentioned in the In Memoriam section.

== Selected filmography ==
- The Glory Brigade (1953)
- Mondo Cane 2 (1963)
- The Tough One (1966)
- Seven Guns for the MacGregors (1966)
- The Battle of Algiers (1966)
- Code Name: Red Roses (1968)
- It's Your Move (1968)
- The Cats (1968)
- Burn! (1969)
- A Woman on Fire (1969)
- The Anonymous Venetian (1970)
- Death Occurred Last Night (1970)
- Let's Have a Riot (1970)
- Short Night of Glass Dolls (1971)
- Black Belly of the Tarantula (1971)
- A Girl in Australia (1971)
- Winged Devils (1971)
- Secret Fantasy (1971)
- Indian Summer (1972)
- Where Does It Hurt? (1972)
- Una cavalla tutta nuda (1972)
- Man Called Amen (1972)
- Deaf Smith & Johnny Ears (1972)
- Tony Arzenta (1973)
- Little Funny Guy (1973)
- The Heroes (1973)
- Dear Parents (1973)
- Rugantino (1973)
- Bread and Chocolate (1973)
- Virility (1974)
- Three Tough Guys (1974)
- Blood Brothers (1974)
- The Gamecock (1974)
- Puzzle (1974)
- Zorro (1975)
- Savage Man Savage Beast (1975, also director)
- Flatfoot in Hong Kong (1975)
- The Left Hand of the Law (1975)
- Apache Woman (1976)
- Savana violenta (1976, also director)
- Sexycop (1976)
- Death Rage (1976)
- Cara sposa (1977)
- Flatfoot in Africa (1978)
- Faces of Death (1979)
- Tesoromio (1979)
- Ogro (1979)
- The Humanoid (1979)
- Life Is Beautiful (1979)
- Flatfoot in Egypt (1980)
- Red Bells (1982)
- Dolce e selvaggio (1983, also director)
- Turbo Time (1983, also screenwriter)
- Cut and Run (1985)
- The Professor (1986)
- Blood Ties (1986)
- Cinema Paradiso (1988)
- What if Gargiulo Finds Out? (1988)
- Everybody's Fine (1990)
- There Was a Castle with Forty Dogs (1990)
- Beyond Justice (1992)
