= Fangio: Una vita a 300 all'ora =

Fangio: A life at 300 kilometres an hour
- Fangio: Una vita a 300 all'ora
- Directed by: Hugh Hudson
- Written by: Gualtiero Jacopetti
- Starring: Juan Manuel Fangio
- Release date: 1981
- Country: Italy

Fangio: Una vita a 300 all'ora (English: Fangio: A life at 300 [ kilometres ] an hour) is a 1981 documentary film about Formula One champion Juan Manuel Fangio. It was directed by Hugh Hudson and stars Fangio as himself. It was written by Gualtiero Jacopetti. It was filmed at Titanus studios.

The movie poster depicts Fangio driving a Maserati F1 car, most likely a 250F.

== Other personnel ==
- Riz Ortolani- music
- John Alcott- cinematography
- Peter Taylor- film editor
- Ivor Powell- production manager
- Tony Jackson- sound department
