= Africa Addio =

1966 Italian mondo film

- 1970 United States theatrical release poster, bearing the title Africa Blood and Guts
- Directed by: Gualtiero Jacopetti; Franco E. Prosperi
- Written by: Gualtiero Jacopetti; Franco E. Prosperi
- Produced by: Angelo Rizzoli
- Narrated by: Sergio Rossi
- Cinematography: Antonio Climati
- Edited by: Gualtiero Jacopetti; Franco E. Prosperi
- Music by: Riz Ortolani
- Production company: Cineriz
- Distributed by: Rizzoli (United States)
- Release date: February 1966 (Italy)
- Running time: 140 minutes
- Language: Italian
- Box office: $2 million (Italy)

Africa Addio (lit. 'Goodbye Africa' or 'Farewell Africa'; also known as Africa: Blood and Guts in the United States and Farewell Africa in the United Kingdom) is a 1966 Italian mondo documentary film co-directed, co-edited and co-written by Gualtiero Jacopetti and Franco E. Prosperi with music by Riz Ortolani. Jacopetti and Prosperi had gained fame (along with co-director Paolo Cavara) as the directors of Mondo Cane in 1962.

Africa Addio documents the decolonisation of Africa during the 1950s and 1960s, along with the violence and chaos that followed. The film was a huge success, which ensured the viability of the so-called "mondo" film genre, a cycle of "shockumentaries"—documentaries featuring sensational topics. The film encountered criticism and praise due to its controversial content, but is nevertheless considered to be a very important film in the history of documentary filmmaking.

== Synopsis ==
The documentary begins with the narrator (Gualtiero Jacopetti) explaining that the Africa of the past has forever disappeared following decolonisation and the withdrawal of Europeans from the continent, and he explains that a new Africa is emerging. The narrator claims that just as America was built on death and violence, the new post-colonial Africa is undergoing a similar process. In the Italian-language version, the narrator states that the film will not provide a moral judgement regarding the events in Africa. In the English-language version, the narrator states that the film will not tell its audience what to think about these events, but rather that the viewer will have to make their own conclusions about what they see.

In British Kenya, the natives celebrate the British relinquishing control and allowing them to establish their own government. Celebrations start with fireworks but end with mobs of locals destroying imported goods from European countries or African colonies that have not yet gained independence, such as Portuguese eggs along with South African oranges and beer. Participants in the Mau Mau rebellion are put on trial for atrocities. One of the Mau Maus is arrested for the mass murder of an entire family of white farmers and their staff. After the massacre, 100 Mau Maus descended on the farm, tortured the animals and committed cannibalism. The surviving animals are euthanized out of mercy. The organiser of the war crimes is sentenced to hard labor for life. In the White Highlands area of Kenya, many white farmers, unwilling to remain without the protection of their government, sell their farms at a loss and prepare to leave the continent forever. The lawns and gardens of their homes are then bulldozed by the new owners to make way for more farmland. The coffins of dead homeowners are exhumed and are taken by their families to be buried again on another continent.

Armies of poachers descend on the savanna, now no longer protected as wildlife preserves. Hundreds of animals, including many elephants, are killed for their pelts and ivory. The British still do their best to protect the wildlife, by moving wildlife preserves and giving medical care to injured baby animals who were orphaned by poachers. A poaching operation is stopped by authorities, and they discover that the poachers had used grenades to kill 300 baby elephants. Hundreds of rotting animals, mainly zebras and gazelles, that had been killed and left by poachers must be burned by authorities for health reasons.

In Zanzibar during its 1964 revolution, rebels target Arab civilians as revenge for Sultanate oppression, one month after independence from British rule. The camera crew arrives in Zanzibar from Tanganyika and attempts to land, but they are not granted permission. They attempt to land anyway, but are shot at and narrowly manage to take off again and escape. A second plane containing three German journalists is unable to leave, and the plane is burned.

Between 18 and 20 January 1964, a genocide occurs in Zanzibar, with large lines of captive Arab civilians being marched at gunpoint to a location where they will be shot by a firing squad. The bodies of countless thousands, some in mass graves and most others strewn across the ground, are photographed from a helicopter. The narrator confirms that this footage is the only documentation to prove that this genocide ever took place. Arab villagers march towards the shorelines, in a futile attempt to escape the carnage. Despite the fact that there was little to no way out at all, only a few manages to ride off in wooden fishing vessels, with the rest being left stranded to their fate. The filmmakers fly over the beach again the following day and find the bodies of all the villagers who tried to get to the ocean. The genocide claimed the lives of approximately 5,000 Arab and South Asian civilians.

At Fort São Sebastião, one of the fortresses on the Ilha de Moçambique built by Vasco de Gama along the coast of Mozambique, Portuguese soldiers attend a Catholic Mass and receive the Eucharist while guerilla rebels on the mainland travel hesitantly through the morning fog. In Angola during the Angolan War of Independence, Portuguese soldiers lay traps for the rebel guerillas in the forest. The narrator bitterly laments that the Portuguese have consistently tried to integrate Angolans into Portuguese society, while the Portuguese colonists were hated and shunned in return.

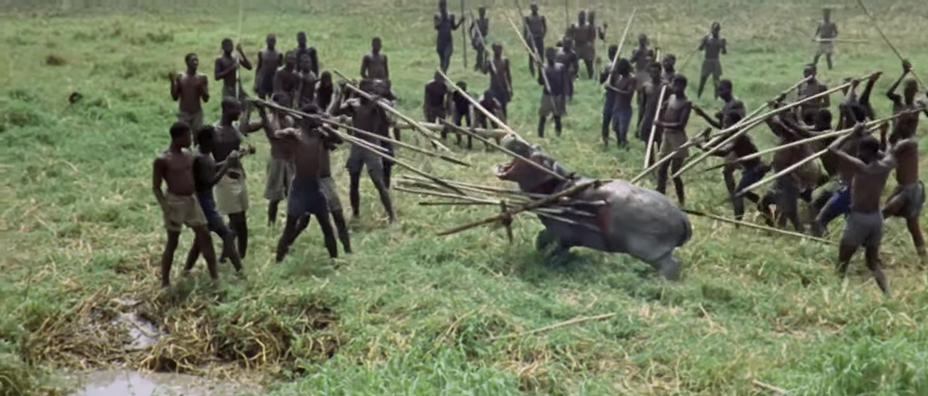
Scene from Africa Addio showing the hunt of a formerly protected hippopotamus on a game preserve.

In the middle of the Bugesera invasion in Rwanda during January 1964, Watusi rebels are pursued by the Bahutu forces after anti-Watusi propaganda was pushed by the Chinese for political purposes. In two months, the Bahutu massacre 18,000 Watusi. On the banks of the Kagera River, 54 amputated hands are found by authorities near a tree that was used as a makeshift chopping block. 25 Bahutu guerillas are arrested for the heinous crime. The waters of the Kwoni send the corpses downstream, and for days fishermen work to remove the bodies so their drinking water isn’t contaminated. The bodies are moved onto the beach and burned in a mass grave. Thousands of refugees attempt to flee to Uganda.

At dawn on 25 February 1964 in Uganda, "operation cropping" begins after the British leave once more and the Ugandan government declares that the national parks will be for hunting. Countless animals, formerly protected, are hunted for their meat. On 25 March 1964 at Murchison Falls National Park, elephants are hunted.

On 3 April 1964 at Queen Elizabeth National Park, hippopotamus are hunted and hundreds of hippo skulls are shown covering a beach. In an attempt to stop the spread of buzzards, the rotting corpses are destroyed with grenades.

In Bagamoyo, Tanganyika, so many Arabs are killed that the morgues overflow with corpses and the bodies have to be laid on the street. In Dar es Salaam, president Nyerere has gone into hiding as the mutinous army troops have taken over the city. Crowds block the bodies of slaughtered Arabs from the camera. Arab shops and houses are destroyed and looted by rioting civilians and Arab civilians are lined up against a wall and shot. An Arab attempting to flee into the sea is drowned by a mob. Soon after, the filmmakers are dragged out of their car violently, with the soldiers preparing to shoot them, but when the soldiers see the filmmakers' Italian passports, they are released because they "aren't whites (British or Irish), they're Italians".

On 26 June 1964, during the civil war in Congo, formerly exiled president of the secessionist State of Katanga, Moïse Tshombe, returns to Léopoldville and promises to fix the political situation in the Congo by stopping the Simba rebellion. Simba rebel forces, armed with bows and believing that a magic spell makes them invulnerable to enemy bullets, go into battle against Tshombe's Belgian mercenaries while high on drugs and are massacred.

On 24 November 1964, during Operation Dragon Rouge, 320 Belgian paratroopers retake Stanleyville, Belgian Congo in 10 minutes, resulting in 7,000 rebels fleeing before they can continue their massacres. The paratroopers and Belgian mercenaries force the rebels to bury the victims of a massacre which resulted in 12,000 Congolese enemies of the revolution being tortured, killed and cannibalised, 80 children being burned alive, 64 people are shot, including Belgians and South Asians, and four Belgian nurses raped. In addition, nine nuns, seven missionaries and four Belgian children were tied together and shot in the mouths and their livers eaten. Thousands of Belgian civilians are rescued and they are transported out of the country on American planes, and the African governments accuse the Americans of unlawfully interfering in their affairs.

At a Catholic mission northeast of Stanleyville, on the border of Congo and Sudan, more than 100 nuns, priests and children are held by a band of rebels who control the Ituri Rainforest. They promise to kill their hostages if a rescue attempt is made, and even though the government does not attempt rescue, the entire mission is massacred anyway.

On 22 October 1964, Rhodesian troops and mercenaries attack Boende in Congo and liberate a convent from rebels who were attempting to kill everyone there. An unarmed Simba rebel is summarily executed by firing squad. The movie features a controversial scene of a mercenary officer executing another unarmed Simba rebel who allegedly burned 27 children alive in a school. Soon after, Tshombe returns to exile.

Finally, in South Africa, apartheid is documented. The film ends with the narrator describing the African penguin on the Cape of Good Hope, and how they ended up stranded on the African continent when the chunk of ice they were on melted. Now strangers in a strange land, these penguins simply try to survive the violent waters as the dark continent grows hotter and more hostile towards them.

== Production ==
=== Filming ===
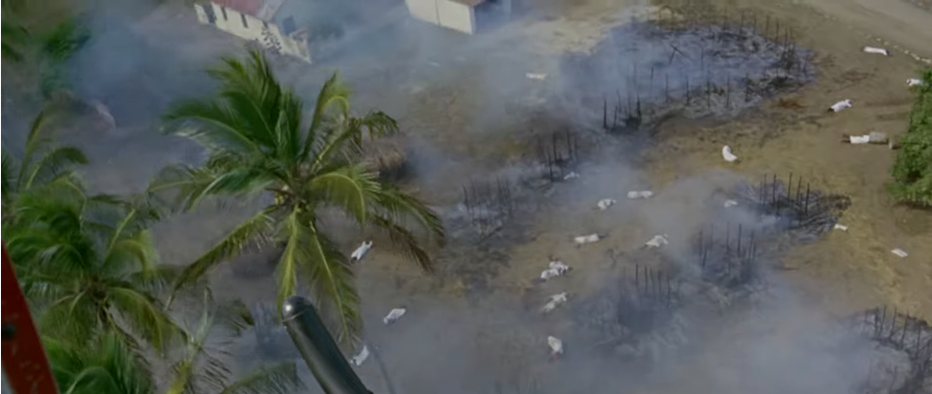
Scene from Africa Addio photographing a burned Arab village along with corpses in Zanzibar

The film was shot over the course of three years across most of sub-Saharan Africa. Most notably, the film features footage from the DR Congo, Tanganyika, Zanzibar, Uganda, Rwanda, Portuguese Angola, Kenya and South Africa. The documentary also includes some behind-the-scenes footage from the 1964 film Zulu. Production was done on 35mm, a rarity for documentaries, which were almost always shot on 16mm at the time. Even more unique was the filmmakers' use of 2-perf Techniscope film. This gave the film a wide 2.35:1 aspect ratio despite the use of standard spherical lenses. Most documentaries were usually seen in the standard 1.33:1 aspect ratio, so a documentary being filmed on such a wide aspect ratio is something that wasn't seen for decades.

The filmmakers were in near-constant danger for most of filming, with Tanganyika and Zanzibar being especially dangerous. In Zanzibar, their planes were shot at and they witnessed rebels lighting a plane crewed by Germans on fire and capturing the people inside. In Dar es Salaam, they were almost shot for photographing a massacre. Jacopetti suffered a cut after a soldier smashed their vehicle's windshield with the butt of his rifle. However, the soldiers let them go because they saw on their passports that they were Italian, and thus, "not whites." Jacopetti would refer to this as "a miracle."

=== Soundtrack ===
A soundtrack of the music used in the film was later released. The composer was Riz Ortolani (who had scored Mondo Cane that featured the tune later used for the hit single More). When making Africa Addio, lyrics were added to Ortolani's title theme, making a song called "Who Can Say?" that was sung by Jimmy Roselli. The song did not appear in the film, but (unlike the successful song More spawned by Mondo Cane) did appear on the United Artists Records soundtrack album.

=== Post-production ===
Prior to the film's release, allegations arose that a scene depicting the execution of a Congolese Simba rebel was actually a murder done for the cameras. This resulted in co-director Gualtiero Jacopetti being arrested on charges of snuff filming. The film's footage was seized by police, and the editing process was halted during the legal proceedings. He was acquitted after he and co-director Franco E. Prosperi produced documents proving they had arrived at the scene just before the execution took place.

A tie-in book with the same title, written by John Cohen, was released by Ballantine to coincide with the film's release.

== Release ==
=== Different versions ===
Various cuts of the film have appeared over the years. The Italian and French versions were edited and were provided with narration by Jacopetti.

The American version, with the explicitly shocking title Africa: Blood and Guts, was re-released in 1970 by Jerry Gross' company Cinemation Industries. Some 40 minutes were cut out, mainly traces of political context; it was edited and translated without the approval of Jacopetti. The differences are such that Jacopetti has said this film is "a betrayal of the original idea”.

== Reception and legacy ==
=== Praise ===
Praise was usually directed at the film's music and visuals, as well as the courage of the filmmakers to deliver such unique and risky footage to the world, especially of massacres that would have been covered up. Africa Addio features the only known combat footage of the Congolese mercenaries, and the only known visual evidence of the genocide of ethnic Arabs during the Zanzibar Revolution. In Italy, it won the 1966 David di Donatello award for producer Angelo Rizzoli. Some conservative publications, such as Italy's Il Tempo, praised the film. In 1968 at the Carnival of Viareggio, a float inspired by the film was part of the parade. It was made by the master of papier-mâché, Il Barzella. Some items from this float, along with other memorabilia including a copy of the book by John Cohen, are kept in Museum of Dizionario del Turismo Cinematografico in Verolengo.

Many commentators, however, accused the film of racism and misrepresentation. Jacopetti and Prosperi responded to critics of the film by defending their intentions.

In the 2003 documentary The Godfathers of Mondo, Prosperi argues that the criticism was due to the fact that, "The public was not ready for this kind of truth." Jacopetti says that the film “was not a justification of colonialism, but a condemnation for leaving the continent in a miserable condition.”

The two men next collaborated on the film Addio Zio Tom, which explored the horrors of American racial slavery. Their film about US history was also criticized for perceived racism.

=== Criticism ===
Film directors Octavio Getino and Fernando Solanas harshly criticized the film in their manifesto Toward a Third Cinema (1970), calling Jacopetti a fascist. They said that in the film, man is "viewed as a beast," and is "turned into an extra who dies so Jacopetti can comfortably film his execution."

Film critic Roger Ebert, in a scathing 1967 review of the shortened American version of the film, called it "racist" and stated that it "slanders a continent." He drew attention to the opening narration:

"Europe has abandoned her baby," the narrator mourns, "just when it needs her the most." Who has taken over, now that the colonialists have left? The advertising spells it out for us: "Raw, wild, brutal, modern-day savages!"

US Ambassador to the United Nations Arthur Goldberg condemned the film as "grossly distorted" and "socially irresponsible," noting the protests of five African UN delegates. In West Germany, a protest movement against the film emerged after Africa Addio was awarded by the state-controlled movie rating board. The protest was chiefly organized by the Socialist German Student Union (SDS) and groups of African students. In West Berlin, the distributor resigned from showing the film after a series of demonstrations and damage to cinemas.

=== Staging allegations ===
Although the filmmakers strongly denied that anything in the film was staged, widespread rumors have claimed that various scenes are inauthentic, and were staged for entertainment purposes. Jacopetti has repeatedly stated that all images in the film are real and that nothing was ever staged. In the documentary The Godfathers of Mondo, Jacopetti and Prosperi stressed that the only scenes they ever staged were in Mondo Cane 2. In the same documentary, Prosperi described their filmmaking philosophy: “Slip in, ask, never pay, never reenact.”

=== Legacy in Zanzibar ===
Having been initially banned in Zanzibar (now Tanzania) on its release, the film has become well-known in the country for its depiction of the massacres of 18–20 January 1964. The film is widely viewed as part of the debate around the Zanzibar Revolution, but some in Zanzibar have denied the authenticity of the film's scenes of massacred Arabs in Zanzibar.

== See also ==
- Goodbye Uncle Tom

== Bibliography ==
- Stefano Loparco, 'Gualtiero Jacopetti – Graffi sul mondo', Il Foglio Letterario, 2014 – ISBN 9788876064760 (The book contains unpublished documents and the testimonies of Carlo Gregoretti, Franco E. Prosperi, Riz Ortolani, Katyna Ranieri, Giampaolo Lomi, Pietro Cavara e Gigi Oliviero).
