= Wax Mask =

- Directed by: Sergio Stivaletti
- Screenplay by: Lucio Fulci; Daniele Stroppa
- Story by: Dario Argento
- Produced by: Giuseppe Colombo
- Starring: Robert Hossein; Romina Mondello
- Cinematography: Sergio Salvati
- Edited by: Paolo Benassi
- Music by: Maurizio Abeni
- Production companies: Cine 2000; France Film International
- Distributed by: Italian International Film
- Release date: 4 April 1997 (Italy)
- Countries: Italy; France
- Budget: $3 million
- Box office: $0.25 million

Wax Mask (Italian: M.D.C. - Maschera di cera) is a 1997 Gothic horror film. The film is set in Rome where a Wax Museum has opened up, whose main attraction is gruesome murder scenes. Shortly after its opening, people began to vanish as new figures appear in the museum.

After witnessing the poor state of Lucio Fulci's health in 1994, Dario Argento decided to help Fulci by working with him to develop a new project. The two eventually agreed upon a remake of House of Wax. Pre-production lasted longer than expected as Argento had been working on his own film The Stendhal Syndrome. Fulci died in 1996, which led to Argento having special effects artist Sergio Stivaletti enter to direct the film. Stivaletti changed the film's script to focus more on special effects.

== Plot ==
The film begins with the murder of a couple in Paris during the year 1900 by a masked man with a metal claw that he uses to rip out their hearts. The sole survivor and witness to the massacre is a young girl, Sonia, who is discovered by an inspector searching the crime scene, Lanvin. Twelve years later, a new wax museum opens in Rome. The main attractions are lifelike recreations of gruesome murder scenes designed to frighten customers. A young man named Luca is encouraged to spend the night in the museum over a bet but is found dead the next morning, seemingly from heart failure.

Soon after, Sonia arrives at the museum seeking a job, as her deceased mother had taught her how to create costumes for wax figures. She is hired by Boris, the owner and curator of the museum, despite objections from his assistant Alex. When she is leaving the museum, Sonia's picture is taken by Andrea, a reporter looking into Luca's death. The two soon become lovers, and Sonia finds herself drawn into his investigations, especially after people start disappearing and new figures fill the museum halls. Inspector Lanvin, who had chosen to reconnect with Sonia while investigating some leads on her mother's death, becomes suspicious of the museum. He becomes particularly suspicious after witnessing the wax exhibit of the murder of Sonia's mother and her partner, as the exhibit contains a metal claw, a detail that was never revealed to the press or anyone outside of the investigation crew. This eventually leads to the murderer visiting Lanvin's hotel room and murdering him while wearing a mask that duplicates his face exactly.

Rattled by Lanvin's death, Sonia begins to suspect that Boris is the man behind the murders and disappearances in Rome, as well as that of her mother. An attempt to learn the truth is thwarted when she discovers that he lacks a metal claw for a hand, however she is eventually kidnapped by the murderer. Her disappearance is noted by her blind aunt, who informs Andrea and the local police that the husband of Sonia's mother did the murders. He was a cold man who chose to focus more on his wax figures, which led to his wife taking a lover. The aunt also talks of the man's strange experiments, which made him seemingly perish in a fire. Back at the museum, Sonia wakes to discover that she was kidnapped by Boris, who is indeed the murderer and had covered up his burned face and metal claw with lifelike skin made of wax.

She manages to get free, but only after discovering that the museum's wax figures are actually people he murdered and treated with chemicals to resemble wax figures. They are kept in a state of life via chemicals Boris invented, but cannot move. Andrea arrives to save Sonia but must battle Boris, whose wax skin progressively melts during the fight as the museum has caught on fire. Sonia and her lover manage to run from Boris, who follows them. During the chase, he is attacked by Alex, who says that he will no longer be his creature. Eventually, Sonia and Andrea are cornered by Boris, who has melted down to a metal skeleton, showing that almost his entire body was wax. He is then killed by Alex, who decapitates him and destroys Boris's brain. As the trio leave the burning museum, Alex leaves to enter a hidden room. He pulls off his face, showing that he has a similar metal skeleton, and switches it out with another, implying that Boris had switched faces with Alex and is now free to kill again in a new location.

== Cast ==
- Romina Mondello as Sonia Lafont
- Robert Hossein as Boris Volkoff
- Riccardo Serventi Longhi as Andrea Conversi
- Umberto Balli as Alex
- Massimo Vanni as Victor
- Gabriella Giorgelli as Aunt Francesca
- Gianni Franco as Inspector Palazzi
- Aldo Massasso as Inspector Lanvin
- Sonia Topazio as Nurse

== Production ==
On speaking of his rivalry between himself and Lucio Fulci, Dario Argento stated that at the Rome Fanta Festival in 1994, he saw Fulci in a wheelchair, describing him as being in a "dreadful physical condition". Argento was informed that Fulci was about to have a serious hospital operation. Argento felt that working would help Fulci recover, and decided to back him in a project of his choosing. Initial plans for a project involved doing a modern adaptation of The Mummy with Dardano Sacchetti working on a screenplay. According to Fulci's daughter Antonella, they heard that George A. Romero was going to make an adaptation of the film and that Argento was not happy with Sachetti's script, so he fired him, hiring Daniele Stroppa.

The project later became a remake of Andre de Toth's House of Wax. Argento liked this idea, and screened copies of de Toth's film as well as Mystery of the Wax Museum (1933). Fulci and his collaborator Daniele Stroppa decided to claim that a Gaston Leroux short story entitled The Waxwork Museum was their official source of inspiration, in case they had any legal problems with Warner Bros. (which had produced House of Wax). There is, however, no such story by Leroux; an interview with film writer Alan Jones (included in the 2019 Severin Films Blu-ray) clarifies that the film was "inspired" by Leroux, but not an adaption of a specific story. Despite this fact, many sources erroneously refer to The Wax Mask as an adaptation of a Leroux story.

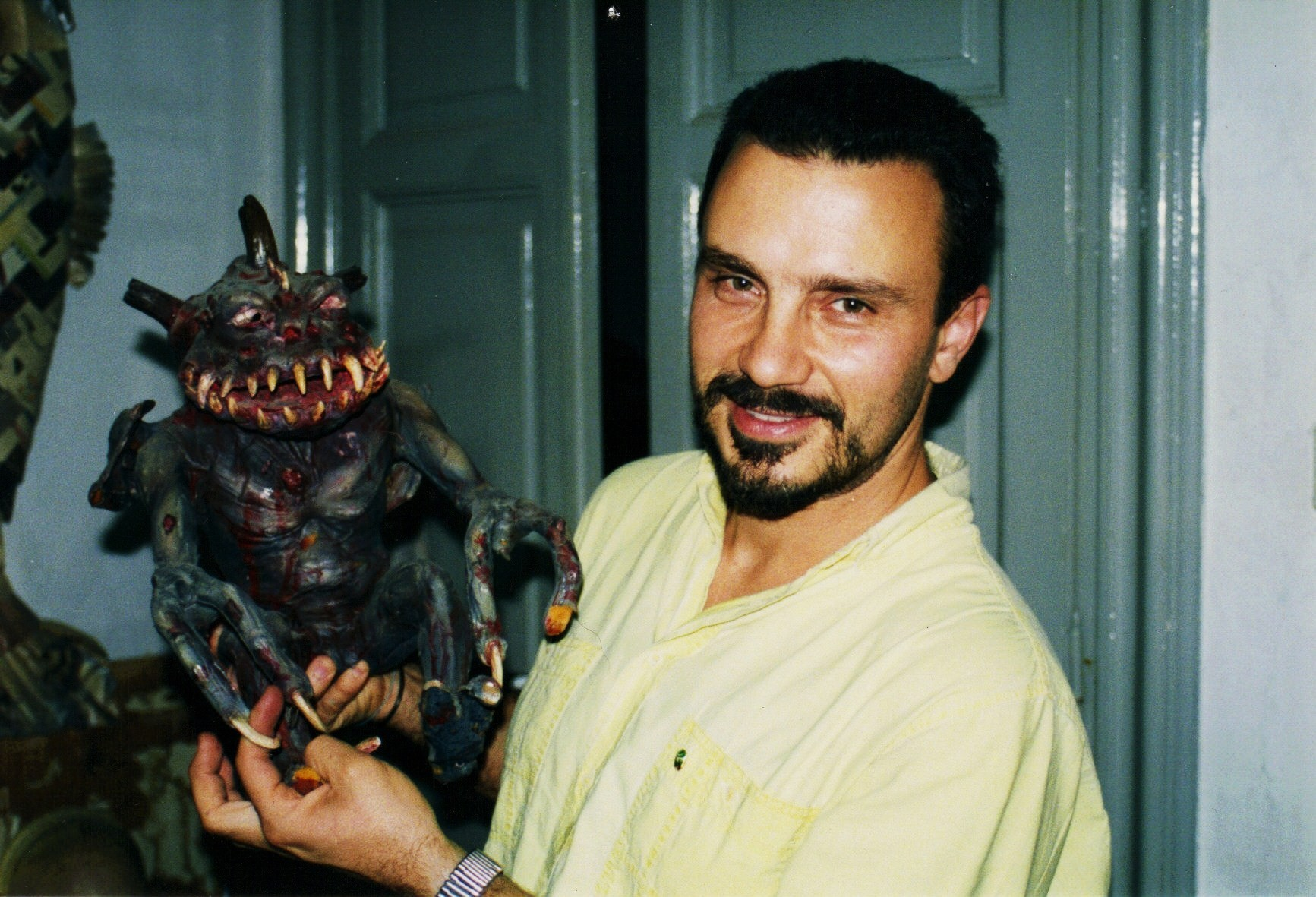
Director Sergio Stivaletti in 1996

According to Alan Jones, Fulci and Argento argued about the direction of the film, with Fulci wanting a more atmosphere driven film while Argento wanted to increase the gore. Pre-production lasted longer than expected as Argento was working on post-production and promotion for his own film The Stendhal Syndrome (1996). Fulci died on March 13, 1997, causing Argento to turn to special effects artist Sergio Stivaletti, who he had previously worked with on films as early as Phenomena (1985). Stivaletti stated that he was shocked when Argento contacted him, finding that he "had been looking or a chance to direct and thought it would be with [his] own film and script [...] I was in the right place at the right time and accepted the offer." On Fulci's death, Stivaletti had the script completely revised. Stivaletti made changes to Fulci's script, tailoring it to his interest in special effects. Much of the films crew was reunited from Argento's film The Stendhal Syndrome. The film had a budget of US$2million that was raised by pre-selling it in France and Germany and involving Italy's biggest foreign distributor, Italian International Films. Variety stated the budget for the film was under $1.25 million. Stivaletti originally had Robert Englund in mind for the lead, but due to budgetary restraints, Robert Hossein took the role. Most of the special effects shots were to be done during post-production allowing the director to supervise them more closely. The film was in production for six weeks in 1996.

== Release ==
Wax Mask opened in Italy on 4 April 1997. It grossed $137,435 from 47 screens on its opening weekend placing ninth at the Italian box office. After 10 days it had grossed $250,000. The film had its North American premiere at the Fantasia International Film Festival in Canada on July 24, 1997.

== Reception ==
Variety reviewed the film favorably, terming it "a luridly entertaining return to the style of Britain's Hammer productions of the '60s" and "a highly enjoyable salute to cheesy vintage horror" but lamented the lack of "a guiding hand with the actors". AllMovie complimented Stivaletti for "[d]isplaying a competent handling of the material, as well as the stylistic excesses that have become synonymous with Italian horror" and concluded that the film "ultimately serves its eerily entertaining purpose".

== See also ==
- List of Italian films of 1997
