= Gabriella Giorgelli =

Italian actress

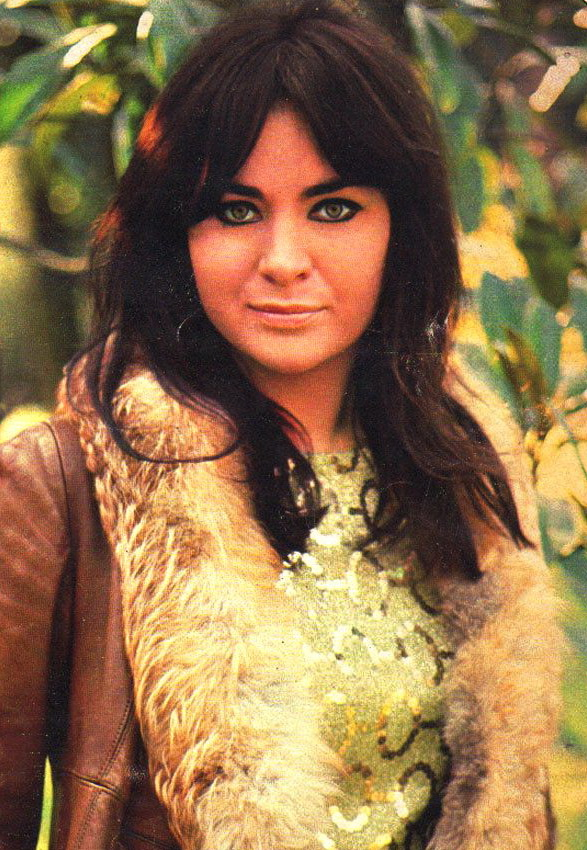
- Giorgelli in 1973
- Born: 29 July 1941 (age 85); Carrara, Kingdom of Italy
- Occupation: Actress
- Years active: 1960–1999

Gabriella Giorgelli (born 29 July 1941) is an Italian film and television actress. She appeared in more than 70 films between 1960 and 1998.

== Biography ==
=== Early life ===
Born in Fossola, a frazione of Carrara, Giorgelli was the daughter of a businessman in the marble industry and a housewife.

When she was a child, her parents separated and she moved to Castelpoggio, another of Carrara's frazione and her mother's birthplace. Due to her mother's economic difficulties, ten-year-old Gabriella was entrusted to the college of the Sisters of Capulet, in Carrara. At fifteen years old she started to work, including as a pizzaiolo and a bartender.

=== Career ===
Giorgelli made her film debut in 1960, in a very minor role in Luigi Comencini's Everybody Go Home.

After winning several local and regional beauty contests, in 1961 she was among the finalists of Miss Italia, and thanks to her participation in the popular beauty pageant she started to attract a significant media attention that allowed her to get more weighty film roles.

After appearing in several art films, in the late 1960s Giorgelli landed some leading roles in B-movies, mainly consisting of spaghetti Westerns and commedia sexy all'italiana films spoofing Pier Paolo Pasolini's The Decameron, which she alternated with supporting roles in more prestigious and high-profile productions. She was also active in a number of series and TV-movies.

Giorgelli also appeared in many photo comics including Sadistik and is interviewed in the documentary film The Diabolikal Super-Kriminal.

== Selected filmography ==
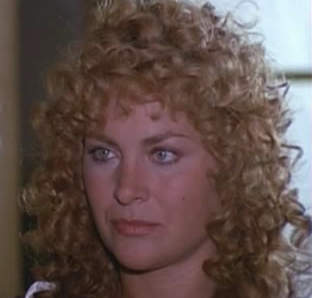
Gabriella Giorgelli in Il lumacone (1974)

- Arturo's Island (1962) – Teresa
- La commare secca (1962) – Esperia
- The Organizer (1963) – Adele
- Outlaws of Love (1963) – Livia
- Shivers in Summer (1964) – Foschina
- Bebo's Girl (1964) – (segment "La Feuille de Route")
- Stranger in Sacramento (1965) – Liza Morgan
- The Dirty Game (1965)
- La ragazzola (1965) – Ines
- El Greco (1966) – Maria
- Maigret a Pigalle (1966) – Tatiana
- Una rete piena di sabbia (1966)
- Long Days of Vengeance (1967) – Dulcie
- Das Rasthaus der grausamen Puppen (1967) – Esther
- On My Way to the Crusades, I Met a Girl Who... (1967) – Dama di compagnia
- Two Faces of the Dollar (1967) – Janet
- Brutti di notte (1968) – Rosaspina Lacantara
- Emma Hamilton (1968) – Laurie Strong
- Operazione ricchezza (1968)
- I 2 deputati (1968) – Rosa
- In Search of Gregory (1969) – Encarna
- Il trapianto (1970) – Carmela
- Shango (1970) – Pamela
- Rough Justice (1970) – Juanita
- When Women Had Tails (1970) – L'esca (uncredited)
- Le Voyou (1970) – L'italienne
- Terzo canale – Avventura a Montecarlo (1970) – The Country Girl
- Tre nel mille (1971)
- Il mio nome è Mallory... M come morte (1971) – Cora Ambler
- Il clan dei due Borsalini (1971) – Bruna la Svelta
- Seven Blood-Stained Orchids (1972) – Ines Tamburini aka Toscana
- Cause of Divorce (1972) – Gasoline pump attendant
- Il Decamerone proibito (1972) – Monna Fiorenza
- Ubalda, All Naked and Warm (1972) – La Ragazza Nel Fienile
- Life Is Tough, Eh Providence? (1972) – Sister
- Fratello homo sorella bona (1972) – Mariangela
- Decameroticus (1972) – Elisa
- Those Dirty Dogs (1973) – Mexican Peasant
- Novelle licenziose di vergini vogliose (1973) – Zia / Aunt Alessandra
- The Police Serve the Citizens? (1973)
- Io e lui (1973) – Fausta – wife of Rico
- Pourvu qu'on ait l'ivresse (1974) – La tante
- Don't Hurt Me, My Love (1974) – 'Cicci' – prostitute
- The Beast (1974) – Zoe
- Il lumacone (1974) – Paola
- Scusi eminenza... posso sposarmi? (1975)
- L'educanda (1975) – Marilena Bolognese
- La moglie vergine (1975) – Matilde
- La polizia brancola nel buio (1975) – Lucia
- Confessions of a Frustrated Housewife (1976) – Menica
- And Agnes Chose to Die (1976) – Lorenza
- The Cynic, the Rat and the Fist (1977) – Maria Balzano
- Three Tigers Against Three Tigers (1977) – Cameriera Arrapata
- Target (1978) – Jasmine
- City of Women (1980) – Fishwoman of San Leo
- Il terno a letto (1980) – Filomena
- Roma dalla finestra (1982)
- Delitto sull'autostrada (1982) – Bocconotti Cinzia
- Hercules (1983) – Mother
- Wild Team (1985) – Psychic Medium
- A Tale of Love (1986) – Sergio's mother
- Moving Target (1988) – Billie Cody
- Wax Mask (1997) – Aunt Francesca
- La rumbera (1998) – Teresa
