= Savana violenta =

1976 Italian mondo film

- Theatrical poster
- Directed by: Antonio Climati; Mario Morra
- Written by: Antonio Climati; Mario Morra
- Produced by: Franco Prosperi
- Narrated by: Giuseppe Rinaldi
- Cinematography: Antonio Climati
- Edited by: Antonio Climati; Mario Morra
- Music by: Guido De Angelis; Maurizio De Angelis
- Distributed by: Titanus
- Release date: 25 August 1976
- Running time: 92 minutes
- Country: Italy
- Language: Italian

Savana violenta (lit. 'Violent Savanna'), also known as This Violent World and Mondo Violence, is a 1976 Italian mondo film directed by Antonio Climati and Mario Morra. The film documents various scenes of graphic behavior in an attempted exposé of worldly violence. It is narrated by Giuseppe Rinaldi. It is the second collaborative feature between Antonio Climati and Mario Morra in their series of mondo films called the Savage Trilogy, following Ultime grida dalla savana.

== See also ==
- List of Italian films of 1976
