= Goodbye Uncle Tom =

1971 Italian mondo film by Franco Prosperi and Gualtiero Jacopetti

- Japanese DVD cover
- Directed by: Gualtiero Jacopetti; Franco Prosperi
- Written by: Gualtiero Jacopetti; Franco Prosperi; English Version: Gene Luotto
- Produced by: Gualtiero Jacopetti; Franco Prosperi
- Cinematography: Claudio Cirillo; Antonio Climati; Benito Frattari
- Edited by: Gualtiero Jacopetti; Franco Prosperi
- Music by: Riz Ortolani
- Production company: Euro International Films
- Distributed by: Euro International Films
- Release date: 30 September 1971
- Running time: 136 minutes
- Country: Italy
- Languages: Italian; English

Goodbye Uncle Tom (Italian: Addio Zio Tom) is a 1971 Italian mondo docudrama film co-directed and co-written by Gualtiero Jacopetti and Franco Prosperi with music by Riz Ortolani. Based on true events, the filmmakers explores the United States during the Antebellum South, using period documents to examine how racism became used as a justification for keeping African Americans enslaved in the 19th century in order to protect the highly lucrative plantation economy in the Southern United States after the enslaved Africans converted to Christianity in the 17th and 18th centuries. Due to the use of published documents and materials from the public record, it is labeled a documentary, though nearly all footage is restaged using actors.

== Production ==
The film was shot primarily in Haiti, where directors Jacopetti and Prosperi were treated as guests of Haitian dictator Papa Doc Duvalier. Duvalier supported the filmmakers by giving them diplomatic cars, clearance to film anywhere on the island, as many extras as they required, and even a weekly dinner with Duvalier himself. Hundreds of Haitian extras participated in the film's various depictions of the cruel treatment of black slaves, as well as white actors portraying historical characters (including Harriet Beecher Stowe).

Scenes were also shot in the U.S. states of Mississippi, Louisiana and Florida.

== Release ==
The film was confiscated in Italy and re-released the following year, 1972, in a cut version bearing the different title Zio Tom.

In France, the film was released as Les Négriers, in Germany as Addio, Onkel Tom!

== Alternative versions ==
The directors' cut of Addio Zio Tom draws parallels between the horrors of slavery and the rise of the Black Power Movement, represented by Eldridge Cleaver, LeRoi Jones, Stokely Carmichael, and a few others. The film ends with an unidentified man’s fantasy re-enactment of William Styron's The Confessions of Nat Turner. This man imagines Nat Turner's revolt in the present, including the brutal murder of the European Americans around him, who replace the figures Turner talks about in Styron's novel as the unidentified reader speculates about Turner's motivations and ultimate efficacy in changing the conditions he rebelled against. American distributors felt that such scenes were too incendiary, and forced Jacopetti and Prosperi to remove more than thirteen minutes of footage explicitly concerned with racial politics for American and other Anglophone audiences.

== Reception ==
The film has frequently been criticized as racist or insensitive because of the graphic violence (both physical and sexual) and racial stereotypes depicted in the film, despite directors Jacopetti and Prosperi's claims to the contrary. In Roger Ebert's 1972 review of the shorter American version, he asserts that the directors have "Made the most disgusting, contemptuous insult to decency ever to masquerade as a documentary." He goes on to call the film "cruel exploitation", believing that the directors degraded the poor Haitian extras playing slaves by having them enact the extremely dehumanizing situations the film depicts virtually as they occurred. Gene Siskel put the film second (behind The Last House on the Left) on his year-end list of what he called the sickest films he saw in 1972. Critic Pauline Kael called the film "the most specific and rabid incitement to race war".

The directors denied accusations of racism; in the 2003 documentary Godfathers of Mondo they specifically note that one of their intentions in making Addio Zio Tom was to "make a new film that would be clearly anti-racist" in response to criticism by Ebert and others over perceived racism or ignorance in their previous film Africa Addio.

The film was a commercial failure. It is now considered a cult classic.

Italian film critic Marco Giusti calls it "not bad" and remembers that the numerous scenes in the nude "made a certain effect back then".

== Soundtrack ==
The film was scored by Italian composer Riz Ortolani and is notable for the theme "Oh My Love" sung by Katyna Ranieri, which would later be used in the soundtrack to the film Drive (2011). Ortolani also collaborated with directors Jacopetti and Prosperi on their previous films, Mondo Cane, and Africa Addio.

== See also ==
- List of films featuring slavery
- Africa Addio

== Bibliography ==
- Giusti, Marco (1999). dizionario dei film italiani STRACULT [sic]. Cles: Sterling & Kupfer. ISBN 978-88-200-2919-7.
