= Traces of Death =

1993 American mondo film

- VHS cover
- Written by: Damon Fox
- Based on: Faces of Death
- Narrated by: Damon Fox
- Edited by: Studio D; Dennis Deroche
- Production companies: Dead Alive Productions; Foxx Entertainment Enterprises
- Distributed by: Brain Damage Films
- Release date: April 20, 1993
- Running time: 76 minutes
- Country: United States
- Language: English

Traces of Death is a 1993 American mondo film that consists of various scenes of stock footage depicting death and real scenes of violence.

== Summary ==
Unlike the earlier Faces of Death which usually included fake deaths and reenactments, Traces consists mostly of actual footage depicting death and injury, and consists also of archival footage from other films. It was written and narrated by Damon Fox.

== Production ==
In the first two films of the series, Damon Fox was the narrator. Darrin Ramage, who would later become the founder of Brain Damage Films, would become the host for the third, fourth and fifth volumes. Unlike Faces of Death, the footage throughout the entire films are real and are not staged or reenacted. Starting with Traces of Death II, scenes were accompanied by background music from death metal and grindcore bands.

In Traces of Death, some notable scenes are included in the film, including the murder of Maritza Martin, the Iranian Embassy siege in London, the suicide of Pennsylvania treasurer R. Budd Dwyer, and the archive footage of the evidence of Ilse Koch.

== Soundtrack ==
The soundtrack for Traces of Death used tracks by J. R. Bookwalter from the 1989 film Robot Ninja. Later in Traces of Death III, the first soundtrack album was released on CD.

=== Traces of Death III soundtrack ===
The soundtrack for Traces Of Death III was released on CD by Relapse Records in 1995. The music featured in the film include:

1. "Regina Confessorum" by Dead World
2. "Orgy of Self-Mutilation" by Dead World
3. "Brainpan Blues" by Pungent Stench
4. "Revenge" by Core
5. "Traces of Death" by Mortician
6. "Frozen in Time" by Kataklysm
7. "Slaughtered" by Hypocrisy
8. "Stained" by Purge
9. "Sadistic Intent" by Sinister
10. "Violent Generation" by Brutality
11. "Skin Her Alive" by Dismember
12. "Into the Bizarre" by Deceased
13. "Low" by Gorefest
14. "Vanished" by Meshuggah
15. "Open Season" by Exit-13
16. "Nightstalker" by Macabre
17. "Blood Everywhere" by Dead World
18. "Down on Whores" by Benediction
19. "God Is a Lie" by Hypocrisy
20. "Bodily Dismemberment" by Repulsion
21. "Darkened Soul" by Core
22. "I Lead You Towards Glorious Times" by Merzbow

== Controversy ==
The original Traces of Death has run into controversy worldwide due to its graphic content.

In 1997, Amy Hochberg, a woman living in Coaldale, Pennsylvania rented the film from a video store and was so disgusted by the film's content that she considered keeping the tape to prevent children from procuring it from the store. She also contacted multiple animal rights groups after witnessing a scene in the film wherein a pig is experimented on with a blowtorch. She also lodged a complaint with the video store she had rented it from, as from the packaging she had thought the film was going to be merely "911 calls with a little more".

In June 2005, the British Board of Film Classification refused to give the first film an age certificate, effectively banning it. The BBFC considered the film to have "no journalistic, educational or other justifying context for the images shown", while also suggesting that the film could potentially breach UK law under the Obscene Publications Act.
