= Daniele Patucchi =

Italian composer (1945)

- Born: 3 December 1945; Turin, Italy
- Died: 2015
- Occupations: Composer; conductor; bassist
- Years active: 1960s–1980s

Daniele Patucchi (born 3 December 1945 – 2015) was an Italian composer, conductor and bassist. He composed over fifty film scores.

== Life and career ==
The son of an artist, Patucchi started his career as a bassist in the early 1960s, collaborating to several recordings and being a member of some RAI orchestras.

Patucchi debuted as a composer in 1969, when he composed the incidental music for a Fernando Arrabal's stage play represented at the Teatro Eliseo in Rome. Since then, he was mostly active as a composer of film scores, collaborating among others with Franco Brusati, Enrico Maria Salerno, Pasquale Festa Campanile, and Paolo Cavara. He also worked on television, where he is best known for the score of the documentary series Uomini del mare. Between 1980 and 1983 he was artistic director for the label CAM. He is regarded as an Italian pioneer of synthesizer-based composition. He died in 2015.

== Selected filmography ==
- Black Killer (1971)
- Man from the Deep River (1972)
- Deaf Smith & Johnny Ears (1972)
- Frankenstein '80 (1972)
- Sex of the Witch (1973)
- Bread and Chocolate (1973)
- Il lumacone (1974)
- Virilità (1974)
- Plot of Fear (1976)
- Cara sposa (1977)
- Break Up (1978)
- Strawberry Blonde (1980)
- Sweet and Savage (1983)
- Turbo Time (1983)
- Warrior of the Lost World (1983)
- Wild Beasts (1984)
