= Damon Fox (writer) =

American writer (born 1966)

- Born: May 17, 1966 (age 59); Phoenix, Arizona, U.S.
- Occupations: Screenwriter, producer

Damon Fox (born May 17, 1966) is an American writer and producer.

His works as a screenwriter include Traces of Death (1993) and Traces of Death II (1994).

== Career ==
During the 1990s, Fox formed Foxx Entertainment Enterprises Inc. With this production company, he created, scripted and narrated the shockumentary films Traces of Death I and II.

In the 1980s, he formed the power-metal band Stormtrooper and only produced one EP, Armies of the Night.

== Selected filmography ==
=== Self ===
- Traces of Death (1993) – narrator, host
- Traces of Death II (1994) – narrator
- The Coroner's Camera (1997) – narrator

=== Producer ===
- Traces of Death (1993) – co-executive producer
- Traces of Death II (1994) – co-executive producer
- The Coroner's Camera (1997) – producer

=== Writer ===
- Traces of Death (1993)
- Traces of Death II (1994)
- The Coroner's Camera (1997)

=== Composer ===
- The Coroner's Camera (1997)
- The Kid & I (2005)

=== Director ===
- The Coroner's Camera (1997)
