= Natura contro =

1988 film

Natura Contro (Cannibal Holocaust II)
- DVD cover
- Directed by: Antonio Climati
- Written by: Antonio Climati; Marco Merlo; Franco Prosperi; Federico Moccia; Lorenzo Castellano
- Starring: Mario Merlo; Fabrizio Merlo; May Deseligny; Pio Maria Federici; Bruno Corazzari
- Cinematography: Antonio Climati
- Edited by: Eugenio Alabiso
- Music by: Maurizio Dami
- Production companies: Dania Film; Filmes International; Medusa Produzione; National Cinematografica; Reteitalia
- Distributed by: Penta Video S.r.l.
- Release date: May 1988
- Running time: 90 minutes
- Country: Italy
- Languages: Italian; Spanish

Natura contro (English: Against Nature), also known in English as The Green Inferno and Cannibal Holocaust II, is a 1988 Italian cannibal adventure film directed by Antonio Climati. Climati had no intention of making a sequel to Cannibal Holocaust, and the title was used by distributors of the film to cash in on the success and notoriety of the earlier film.

It is best known among cult fans as the film that effectively ended the cannibal genre, which, by then, had virtually fallen extinct. In 2002, British distributor VIPCO released Natura Contro on VHS and DVD as Cannibal Holocaust II, the film's most well known name.

This was the last film directed by Climati, who had gained notoriety as a major player in the mondo film genre. Although fictional, this film deals with many common tropes of mondo films, including exotic customs and locales, and cruel violence.

== Plot ==
Friends Jemma Demien, Mark, Fred, and Pete head into the Amazon jungle to find a lost professor. He is believed to be dead until Jemma recovers his lighter. She rounds up the three men to head into the jungle and find the legendary Imas tribe, who possess an equally legendary treasure and with whom the professor is believed to be found.

After Jemma stumbles upon the lighter, she immediately telephones Pete. He agrees with her plan and hires Fred and Mark to successfully steal a seaplane, in which the three men fly down to the River Amazon to meet Jemma. They, united, then head to a town, Fort Angel, to hire a guide named Juan Garcia. When Garcia refuses to help, they decide to head out by themselves, but first, they need more gasoline. They find a man named Don Pedro, who runs a business that transports monkeys from the wild to zoological gardens. After Pete resuscitates a monkey, Don Pedro agrees to give them gasoline if they catch monkeys for him. The group heads into the jungle by canoe (with guides supplied by Don Pedro), where Pete uses a trumpet to greet strangers on the river. Before they reach their destination and set camp, a small electric ray swims up a guide's anus. At the campsite, the group suffers an attack by bats before moving on to hunt monkeys.

A guide instructs the group how to use a blowpipe, and the hunt begins. They bag several monkeys with darts and even more with nets. However, the local natives who eat the monkeys as food become disgruntled and capture the hunters. Jemma is forced to act like a monkey, Mark is covered in and bitten by fire ants, and Pete is hung tightly to a tree until he negotiates their release by giving the natives a tape recorder. After being freed, they return to provide the monkeys to Don Pedro and continue on their way. Jemma tells her friends of a contact she knows in a local tribe who can find the Imas tribe. However, when they arrive at the tribe's village, they find that the contact and most of the tribe's men have been slaughtered by gold prospectors, also looking for the Imas and their treasure. The four friends decide that they must stop these gold hunters before they reach the Imas. A young tribal girl, Kuwala, also knows where to find the Imas and agrees to take them there if they help rescue her sister, who the prospectors kidnapped. While at the village, they save a leopard from a tiger trap.

The group meets a river snake fisherman. He shelters them for the night if they help him catch anacondas. Jemma must also fight off unwanted advances from the fisherman. The next morning, they fly off and finally locate the gold prospectors' camp. They sneak in and overpower the men in one cabin to rescue Kuwala's sister but are captured shortly afterward. All five are taken to the camp's leader, who turns out to be Juan Garcia. Garcia threatens to have the men's penises bitten off by a snake if Kuwala doesn't tell him where the Imas are located. Kuwala agrees and tells him that the Imas are on an "island in the shape of a ring, where three rivers meet. It's called 'The Island of the Imas.'" At that moment, the other four fight back against their captors and escape with Kuwala and her sister. They steal a barrel of gasoline and two canoes, tie the canoes to the plane, and the plane drags the excess people down the river.

While setting up their next campsite, Kuwala's sister is taken by the river current and begins to drown. Mark flies the plane down the river while Fred barefoot skis behind it to save her, only for Fred and the others to be caught by child smugglers, except for Mark, who escapes in the aircraft. The smugglers drug the children they kidnap from local tribes and ship them to various buyers who want to harvest their organs. Mark returns to set fire to some bushes outside the smugglers' hideout, smoking them out. The others rescue the children and escape back into the jungle. During the escape, however, Jemma is bitten by a venomous snake. Kuwala guides them to another local tribe, where they use their tribal medicine to restore Jemma to health. After partaking in a tribal ritual, they get back on their way.

The group locates the Island of the Imas, only to find that the gold prospectors have beaten them there. Fred, Mark, and Pete head onto the island while the others stay behind. There they find several mutilated bodies, tortured to death by the prospectors, two of whom they encounter and overcome, taking their weapons. They become embroiled in a battle between the tribe and the intruders; the hunters are finally outnumbered and slaughtered. In the aftermath, they find Professor Korenz, adopted into the tribe. Jemma and the others make their way to the reunion, where Professor Korenz reveals that the tribe is not the Imas, who do not even exist. After taking several photographs of the tribe, Jemma tells the professor that they should leave and claim that they have, in fact, discovered the Imas tribe for fame and funding when they return home. They betray Pete, Mark, and Fred by stealing the aircraft and flying back without them, so there would be no one to refute their "discovery" of the Imas.

Years later, Jemma and Professor Korenz return to bring back the three men they had left behind. Pete then narrates the eventual fates of the rest of the group: the professor is back in the Amazon, Jemma is a successful journalist, Mark is an airline pilot, Fred opened a water skiing school, and Pete is a doctor and bandleader in the Mediterranean.

== Cast ==
- Mario Merlo as Fred
- Fabrizio Merlo as Mark
- May Deseligny as Jemma Demien
- Pio Maria Federici as Pete
- Bruno Corazzari as Child Smuggler
- Roberto Ricci as Professor Korenz
- Jessica Quintero as Kuwala
- David Maunsell as River Fisherman
- Sasha D'Arc as Kuwala's sister
- Roberto Alessandri as Head Hunter
- Salvatore Borgese as Juan Garcia

== Release ==
The film premiered in May 1988 in Italy. Grindhouse Releasing released the film in association with Cult Movie Mania, along with the film Cannibal Holocaust for the first time on VHS, DVD and Blu-ray in 2015.
