= Franco E. Prosperi =

Italian film director (born 1928)

Franco E. Prosperi (born 1928) is an Italian journalist and marine scientist who became a documentary director and producer. He is best known for his lasting collaboration with Gualtiero Jacopetti in the mondo film genre. His only fictional film was Wild Beasts (Belve feroci).
