= Mondo Cane =

1962 Italian mondo film

- Original theatrical poster
- Directed by: Gualtiero Jacopetti; Paolo Cavara; Franco Prosperi
- Written by: Gualtiero Jacopetti; Paolo Cavara
- Produced by: Gualtiero Jacopetti; Angelo Rizzoli
- Narrated by: Stefano Sibaldi; Anthony La Penna (English-language version)
- Cinematography: Antonio Climati; Benito Frattari
- Edited by: Gualtiero Jacopetti
- Music by: Riz Ortolani; Nino Oliviero
- Distributed by: Cineriz
- Release date: 30 March 1962
- Running time: 108 minutes
- Country: Italy
- Language: Italian
- Box office: $2 million (US/CAN rentals)

Mondo Cane (a somewhat coarse Italian expletive, literally 'dog world') is a 1962 Italian mondo documentary film directed by the trio of Gualtiero Jacopetti, Paolo Cavara, and Franco E. Prosperi, with narration by Stefano Sibaldi (Anthony La Penna provided the narration for the English-language release). The film consists of a series of travelogue scenes that provide glimpses into cultural practices around the world with the intention of shocking or surprising Western film audiences. These scenes are presented with little continuity, as they are intended as a kaleidoscopic display of shocking content rather than presenting a structured argument. Despite its claims of genuine documentation, certain scenes are either staged or creatively manipulated to enhance this effect.

The film was an international box-office success and inspired an entire genre of mondo films in the form of exploitation documentaries, many of which also include the word mondo (meaning "world") in their title. The musical score by Riz Ortolani and Nino Oliviero gained considerable popularity outside of the film itself. Its main theme, "More", won a Grammy Award and earned an Oscar nomination for Best Original Song, and was covered by such artists as Frank Sinatra, Andy Williams, Roy Orbison, Bobby Darin and Vince Guaraldi.

== Vignettes ==
While the credits are displayed overtop, a man drags a frightened dog in front of a large fenced area containing many larger barking dogs. As the credits end, the man opens the gate and kicks the dog through, where it is immediately chased by the other dogs.

A statue by Luigi Gheno is dedicated to Rudolph Valentino in his hometown of Castellaneta, Italy. At the event the narrator points out similarities in some local men's faces to Valentino's.

In the United States, Rossano Brazzi has his shirt torn off by a crowd of adoring female fans hunting for his autograph.

At the beach in polyandrous Kiriwina, one of the Trobriand Islands in the Australian Territory of Papua and New Guinea (now Papua New Guinea), a large crowd of topless Melanesian women run after a handful of men, trying to capture them "not only for autographs".

On the French Riviera, a small group of blonde bikini-clad young women on a boat drive by a ship with U.S. sailors, "wooing" them teasingly from the distance by sending them kisses, showing their tongues and flaunting their breasts.

In a New Guinean Chimbu community, a woman whose child was killed breastfeeds a piglet whose mother died. Also in New Guinea, at a celebration that recurs every five years, in a matter of hours, dozens of pigs are slaughtered by beating on their heads with wooden poles, and eaten, after which the partly cannibalistic community returns to its perpetual state of hunger. Dogs, however, are fed some of the pork and treated with affection and respect.

At the Pet Haven Cemetery in Pasadena, California, dog owners mourn their departed pets.

A restaurant sign advertises "FAMOUS DISH ROAST DOG MEAT". Live dogs are shown in cages, and butchered dog parts are shown being cooked.

In Rome, hundreds of chicks are tinged in many colors and then dried at 50 degrees Celsius (122 degrees Fahrenheit) to be included in Easter eggs; according to the narrator, of each 100 that undergo it, approximately 70 do not survive the procedure.

For foie gras, geese in Strasbourg are force-fed using funnels.

In a farm 200 miles from Tokyo, Wagyu cattle are treated with care by being massaged and fed beer, so that their meat can eventually be served at luxury restaurants in Tokyo and New York.

On New Guinean Tabar, the most beautiful women are locked up in small wooden cages and fed tapioca until they reach 120 kilos (264 pounds) to be offered as wives to the village dictator.

In a Vic Tanny health club in Los Angeles, overweight women work on losing weight to recover from a previous marriage.

At a Hong Kong market, exotic animals are sold for food.

At the New York restaurant The Colony, canned exotic animals are served for rich Americans.

At a Singapore snake store, a snake is chosen and butchered for consumption.

In the Italian village of Cocullo, on Saint Dominic's day, the saint's statue is carried in a procession along with large numbers of wild snakes as the centrepiece of a festival.

In Nocera Terinese, on Good Friday, each "vattienti" beats their legs with glass shards and spills their blood on the streets where the procession will take place.

A parade of the "Life Savers Girls Association" make their way to Sydney's Manly Beach to put on a surf carnival, including demonstrations of CPR on young men.

Due to the nuclear contamination on Bikini Atoll, swarms of dead butterflies drift at sea, birds hide in holes in the ground, a species of Periophthalmus fish migrated to the trees, sea gulls brood over sterile eggs, and disoriented turtles move inland and die on the atoll's dry sand dunes. Birds nest in the skeletons of turtles, which move in the wind as if they were still alive.

In Malaysian underwater cemeteries, sharks get accustomed to human flesh. Their fins are dried on the beach and collected by disabled fishermen, who sell them to the Chinese as aphrodisiacs. A 12-year-old Malaysian boy has been killed by sharks, and the fishermen exact revenge by shoving toxic sea urchins into the mouths of sharks, releasing them again to slowly die.

In Rome's Capuchin Crypt, bones are arranged as ornaments, while on Tiber Island, the Sacconi Rossi ("Red Sacks") guard the bones of nameless victims of the past since around 1600, which on Fridays are cleaned by local families including children.

On the Reeperbahn in Hamburg, people indulge by drinking beer. They sleep standing up, dance, drunkenly fight, and fool around, then experience hangovers the following morning.

Tokyo has a massage parlor catering to men who are drunk.

In Macao, the recently-deceased are tended to with cosmetics in preparation for their funerals. Congregations of mourners burn money as a donation for the departed to take with them to the afterlife. Meanwhile, in Singapore, where 60% of citizens are of Chinese descent, there is a hotel for the dying members of Chinese families. Relatives await their demise by making merry at restaurants in the plaza nearby.

Cars are crushed at a junkyard in Los Angeles, reduced to metal cubes for recycling. One such cube is put on display at a gallery in Paris.

The French artist Yves Klein, erroneously introduced as Czechoslovak, comes forward from one of his monochromatic blue paintings to start of a line of musicians to play his Monotone Symphony. A group of women employed by Klein immerse themselves in blue paint and use their bodies to create impressions on a canvas that will be sold for 4 million French francs.

In Honolulu, tourists are showered with leis and witness a hula dance.

In Nepal, Gurkha soldiers perform a rite of passage by dressing up in women's clothing on anniversary of the execution of 300 Gurkha POWs by the Japanese Imperial Army during WWII. In a ritualistic contest of strength, they behead buffalo.

In Portugal, there is a morning running of the bulls for working-class citizens and an afternoon bull-taunting inside a stadium for noble-born men in formal costumes.

In Goroka, a city in Papua New Guinea, there are indigenous tribes who attend Catholic church services.

The film concludes with footage of a group of indigenous people who live as part of a cargo cult in the mountains near the airport of Port Moresby. Having encountered and interacted with foreign airmen during World War II, the people have built icons of worship from bamboo that resemble an airport runway, airplane, and control tower.

== Production ==
In the beginning, as Cavara (who took the helm for European and Euro-Asiatic zone) and his supervisor Stanis Nievo' interviews revealed, Mondo Cane was a unique project conceived with La donna nel Mondo, and worked on at the same time (1960–62).

=== Release ===
In the United States, Jean Goldwurm's Times Film Corporation released Mondo Cane in 1963.

== Reception ==
Mondo Cane was an international box-office success and inspired the production of numerous, similar exploitation documentaries, many of which also include the word "Mondo" in their title. These films collectively came to be recognized as a distinct genre known as mondo films. In addition, the film's success led Jacopetti and Prosperi to produce several additional documentaries, including Mondo Cane 2, Africa addio and Addio zio Tom, while Cavara directed La donna nel mondo, Malamondo, as well as the anti-Mondo drama Wild Eye (Occhio selvaggio).

=== Accolades ===
The film was nominated for two awards for the 1962 film season. It won the David di Donatello for Best Production (Migliore Produzione) by the Accademia del Cinema Italiano, which it shared with Una vita difficile. It was also nominated for the Palme d'Or at the 15th Cannes Film Festival, which it lost to O Pagador de Promessas. The theme song, "More", was written by Riz Ortolani and Nino Oliviero, and was given new lyrics in English by Norman Newell. In 1963, the song was nominated for the Academy Award for Best Original Song, where it lost to "Call Me Irresponsible" from the film Papa's Delicate Condition.

== Influence ==
The film spawned several direct sequels, starting with Jacopetti and Prosperi's own Mondo Cane 2 (also known as Mondo Pazzo), released the following year. Much later, in the 1980s, two more emerged: Mondo Cane Oggi: L'Orrore Continua and Mondo Cane 2000: L'Incredible. The films continued into the nineties with two follow-ups from German filmmaker Uwe Schier; despite the fact that they were the fifth and sixth installments, they were titled Mondo Cane IV and Mondo Cane V. Mondo Cane IV is partially made up of footage taken from the 1989 film Death Scenes.

As well as encouraging sequels, Mondo Cane's shock-exploitation-documentary-exquisite corpse style is credited with starting a whole genre: the mondo film. Examples include Mondo Bizarro, Mondo Daytona, Mondo Freudo (1966), Mondo Mod, Mondo Infame, Mondo New York, and Mondo Hollywood; later examples include the Faces of Death series.

The film also inspired lampooning, including Mr. Mike's Mondo Video, written by Saturday Night Live's Michael O'Donoghue and starring members of the contemporary cast of the program.

In 2010, Mike Patton released a musical album of cover versions of 1950s and 1960s Italian music, also titled Mondo Cane.

== Bibliography ==
- Goodall, Mark. Sweet & Savage: The World Through the Shockumentary Film Lens. London: Headpress, 2006.
- Kerekes, David, and David Slater. Killing for Culture: An Illustrated History of Death Film from Mondo to Snuff. London: Creation Books, 1995.
- Stefano Loparco, 'Gualtiero Jacopetti – Graffi sul mondo'. The first complete biography dedicated to the codirector of 'Mondo Cane'. Il Foglio Letterario, 2014 – ISBN 9788876064760
- Fabrizio Fogliato, Paolo Cavara. Gli occhi che raccontano il mondo Il Foglio Letterario 2014. (It contains Mondo cane's original subject, never published before, and a developed critical analysis on great and artistic approach by Cavara in Mondo cane and La donna nel mondo (pp. 57–88; 187–212)
