= Gualtiero Jacopetti =

Italian film director

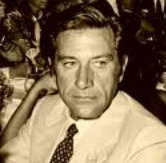
- Jacopetti in the 1960s
- Born: 4 September 1919; Barga, Tuscany, Kingdom of Italy
- Died: 17 August 2011 (aged 91); Rome, Italy
- Occupations: Film director; screenwriter
- Years active: 1962–1975

Gualtiero Jacopetti (Italian: [ɡwalˈtjɛːro jakoˈpetti]; 4 September 1919 – 17 August 2011) was an Italian documentary film director. With Paolo Cavara and Franco Prosperi, he is considered the originator of mondo films, also called "shockumentaries".

== Early life ==
Gualtiero Jacopetti was born in Barga, in Northern Tuscany, in 1919. During World War II, he served in the Italian Resistance to fascist dictator Benito Mussolini. After the war, on the advice of his friend and mentor Indro Montanelli, he began to work as a journalist. He co-founded the influential liberal newsweekly Cronache (considered to be a direct predecessor to L'Espresso) in 1953, only to be forced to shut down production after publishing risque photographs of actress Sophia Loren which caused the paper to be charged with manufacturing and trading pornographic material (a charge which also earned Jacopetti a year-long prison sentence). He subsequently worked as a journalist, editor, newsreel writer, actor and short-subject film maker. He also worked on screenplays for René Clément (The Joy of Living, 1961) and Alessandro Blasetti (Europa di notte, 1959) before undertaking his own career as a director.

== Film career ==
In 1960, he approached his colleagues Franco Prosperi and Paolo Cavara with the unusual idea of making an "anti-documentary". The result, which premiered in 1962, was Mondo Cane (which roughly translates to A Dog's World, a minor curse in Italian), a non-narrative compilation of shocking and unusual footage from around the world. It premiered at the 1962 Cannes Film Festival, where it was well-received and even nominated for the Palme d'Or. The theme song "More" by Italian composer Riz Ortolani was nominated for the Academy Award for Best Original Song in 1963, the year of its premier in the United States.

The success of Mondo Cane inspired an entire genre of documentaries featuring lurid or shocking subjects, which came to be known as mondo film. Jacopetti and Prosperi (who would become film-making partners for the remainder of Jacopetti's directorial career) went on to make several more entries into this genre, including Women of the World (with Paolo Cavara), Mondo Cane 2, Africa Addio and the faux-documentary Goodbye Uncle Tom. In the 2003 documentary The Godfathers of Mondo, Jacopetti describes the style they used to make these films: "Slip in, ask, never pay, never reenact."

During the filming of Africa Addio—which includes footage of intense fighting and mass death in the Mau Mau Uprising, the Zanzibar Revolution, the Simba rebellion, and other post-colonial African conflicts—the crew was interrogated in Zaire, and arrested and nearly executed in Tanzania, before an army official intervened on their behalf, shouting "Stop – they're not whites, they're Italians." A scene depicting the execution of a Simba rebel during the Simba rebellion in the Republic of the Congo (Léopoldville) resulted in Jacopetti being charged with murder in Italy; he was acquitted after producing documents demonstrating the footage had not been staged for the cameras.

Following the critical and commercial failure of the faux-documentary Goodbye Uncle Tom (which reviewer Roger Ebert called "...the most disgusting, contemptuous insult to decency ever to masquerade as a documentary"), Jacopetti and Prosperi attempted a fictional film, 1975's Mondo candido (a modern version of Candide by French philosopher Voltaire). Jacopetti went on to write (but not direct) one further documentary, 1981's Fangio: Una vita a 300 all'ora (which follows the career of Formula One driver Juan Manuel Fangio) before returning to print media for the remainder of his career.

== Death ==
Jacopetti died on August 17, 2011, at the age of 91. His ashes were interred in the Non-Catholic Cemetery in Rome. He was buried next to his girlfriend, the British actress Belinda Lee, who died in 1961 in a car accident in which Jacopetti was also hurt.

== Criticism ==
Despite their early success with Mondo Cane, controversy followed Jacopetti and Prosperi's careers. The New York Times reviewer Pauline Kael dismissed Mondo Cane, claiming that its advocates were "too restless and apathetic to pay attention to motivations and complications, cause and effect". Criticism became even more pronounced with Africa Addio, which Roger Ebert called "brutal, dishonest, and racist" and claims that it "slanders a continent". Ebert's review was not based on the original film but on an edited version for US audiences. This version was edited and translated without the approval of Jacopetti. Indeed, the differences are such that Jacopetti has called this film a "betrayal" of the original idea. Notable differences are thus present between the Italian and English-language versions in terms of the text of the film. Many advocates of the film feel that it has unfairly maligned the original intentions of the filmmakers.

Jacopetti claimed his intent was to create films that "...would play on the big screen whose subject was reality". In the 2003 documentary The Godfathers of Mondo, Prosperi went on to claim criticism of their work was due to the fact that "The public was not ready for this kind of truth." Both directors denied staging anything for their films, with the exception of Mondo Cane 2 which they acknowledge does contain some staged or recreated footage.

== Filmography ==
As director

- Mondo Cane (A Dog's World), 1962
- Women of the World, 1963
- Mondo Cane 2, 1963
- Africa Addio (Africa Blood and Guts or Farewell Africa), 1966
- Goodbye Uncle Tom, 1971
- Mondo candido (White World), 1975
- Operazione ricchezza (Operation Wealth), 1983
- Un'idea della pace (An Idea of Peace), 1985

As screenwriter

- Europa di notte (Europe by Night) directed by Alessandro Blasetti, 1959
- Il mondo di notte (World by Night) directed by Luigi Vanzi, 1959
- The Joy of Living directed by René Clément, 1961
- Fangio: Una vita a 300 all'ora (Fangio: A Life at 300 an Hour) directed by Hugh Hudson, 1981
