= Michael Federmann =

Israeli businessman

Mikey Federmann
- מיקי פדרמן
- Born: 9 September 1943 (age 82); Haifa, Mandatory Palestine
- Education: Hebrew University of Jerusalem (BA, MBA)
- Board member of: Elbit Systems; Dan Hotels; Hebrew University of Jerusalem (Board of Trustees); Weizmann Institute of Science
- Spouse: Leora Federmann
- Children: 3

Michael Ilan Yoel "Mikey" Federmann (Hebrew: מיקי פדרמן; born 9 September 1944) is an Israeli drone manufacturer and billionaire. He is in charge of Elbit Systems and the Dan Hotels group. Under his leadership, Elbit Systems multiplied its size many times and became a major player in the Unmanned Aerial Vehicle market globally as well as in other areas of military defence technology.

== Early life and education ==
Federmann was born in Haifa to Bella and Yekutiel "Ksil" Federmann, brother of Irit Federmann-Landau. He received a bachelor's degree in economics and political science and then an MBA from the Hebrew University. He served in the Israel Defense Forces' elite unit Sayeret Matkal where he was a member of Ehud Barak's unit.

== Business ==
Since 2002, Federmann has been the owner of Israeli conglomerate Federmann Enterprises Ltd which was started by his father and uncle. His cousin Ami Federmann also holds a stake. Federmann chairs the boards of its two biggest publicly traded holdings: defense electronics maker Elbit Systems and luxury hotel operator Dan Hotels Corp.

=== Elbit ===
Federmann joined Elbit when his El-Op company merged with it in 1998. That doubled it in size. Elbit was naturally going to benefit from the global growth of the UAV market however, the 700% growth of Elbit over the following decade was also largely due to Federmann and CEO David Ackerman's leadership of Elbit Systems. They embarked on an ambitious global buyout strategy for the sake of growth. The strategy has made Elbit into a multibillion-dollar multinational.

=== Dan Hotels ===
Under the aegis of Federmann the hotel group has continued to grow, thanks to growing tourism and business in the country as well as ongoing expansion of the chain. Dan Hotels began as a boarding house on the Tel Aviv seafront that was purchased by his father and uncle in 1947. Over the following decades it grew to be a national chain. It has expanded its horizon to India. Their first hotel in India is in the Silicon City, Bengaluru. The Den Bengaluru is located in Whitefield. Part of the chain is the King David Hotel in Jerusalem.

== Wealth ==
He was ranked 7th wealthiest in the Maariv newspaper's top 100 in Israel in 2010 with an estimated wealth of 6.5 billion Shekel (approximately $1.4 billion). In that year he was ranked No. 721 in Forbes' List of billionaires. In 2011 he was ranked No. 879 and in 2012 he dropped off the ranking of the top 1000. As of November 2025, Forbes estimates Federmann's net worth to be $6.6 billion.

== Honours ==
- In June 2014 he received an honorary CBE in Queen Elizabeth II's Birthday Honours list 2014 - For services to UK/Israel business cooperation and UK prosperity.

== Senior positions ==
- Chairman of the Board of Elbit Systems.
- Chairman of the Board of Dan Hotels.
- Chairman of the Board of Trustees of the Hebrew University of Jerusalem.
- Board member of the Weizmann Institute of Science.

== Personal life ==
Federmann and his wife Leora have 3 children, including Daniel who is married to Sharona Pick, daughter of Svika Pick and sister-in-law of Quentin Tarantino.
