= Yitzhak Taito =

Yitzhak (Tahor) Taito
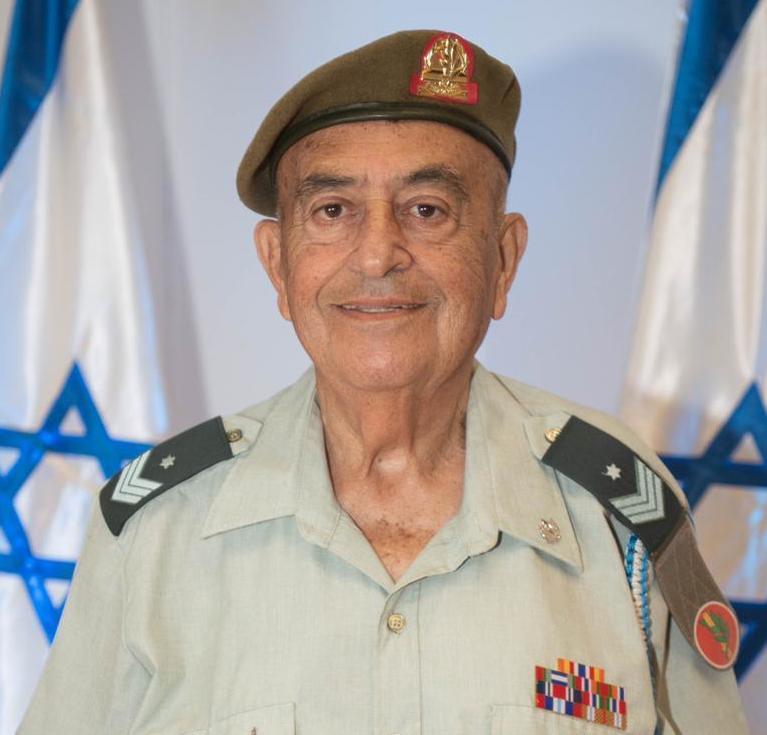
- Native name: יצחק (טהור) טאיטו
- Born: 13 June 1941 (age 84); French protectorate of Tunisia
- Allegiance: Israel
- Branch: Israel Defense Forces
- Service years: 1959-2021 (62 years)
- Rank: Rav Nagad (Chief Warrant Officer)
- Commands: IDF's Officers School ("Bahad 1") drill sergeant.
- Conflicts: Six-Day War; War of Attrition; Yom Kippur War; 1982 Lebanon War; South Lebanon conflict (1985–2000); 2006 Lebanon War; Operation Protective Edge

Yitzhak (Tahor) Taito (Hebrew: יצחק (טהור) טאיטו; born June 13, 1941) is an Israeli Rav Nagad (chief warrant officer) in reserves.

He served as the IDF's officers school (bahad 1)'s drill sergeant, from June 1968 to July 2021. He is regarded as the most senior Israel defense forces soldier.

== Biography ==
Taito was born in Tunisia to a family of traders and made aliyah to Israel in 1949 when he was 8. He joined the IDF in November 1959, there he served in the Nahal Brigade as a squad commander, section commander, and company commander. In 1963, he was transferred to the IDF's officer school (Bahad 1), there he served as a company sergeant major and the deputy of the base's drill sergeant, Shlomo Yisraeli. Upon completion of the officers' course in June of that year, Taito was appointed the base's drill sergeant and camp commander. Since then he has served in this position continuously.

On July 26, 2021, after his 80th birthday, he has finished his position and went into retirement.

He was responsible for thousands of ceremonies, including the military funeral ceremony of Prime Ministers David Ben-Gurion in 1973, and Yitzhak Rabin in 1995, as well as the reception for Egyptian President Anwar Sadat in 1977.

== Awards and recognition ==
- In 2018, he received a "lifetime achievement award "for his work from then commander of the ground forces, Aluf (Major General) Yaakov Barak.
- העתק ממוזער של דמותו של רנ"ג טאיטו, נמצא בפארק מיני ישראל.

== Personal life ==
Taito lives in Beersheba, he has a daughter and two sons.

== Gallery ==
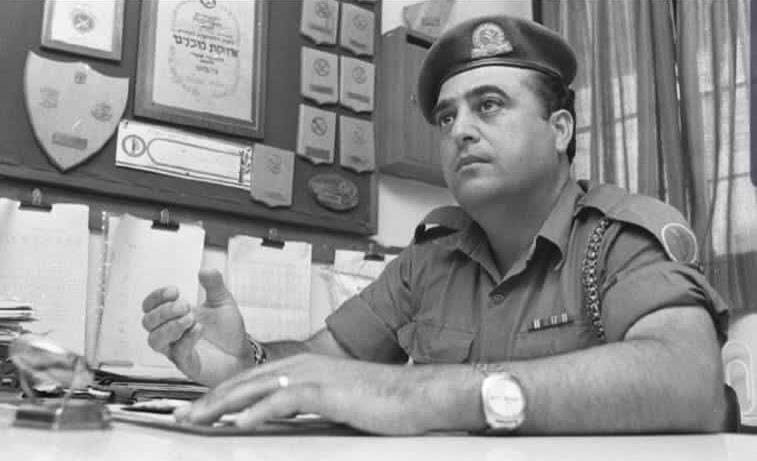

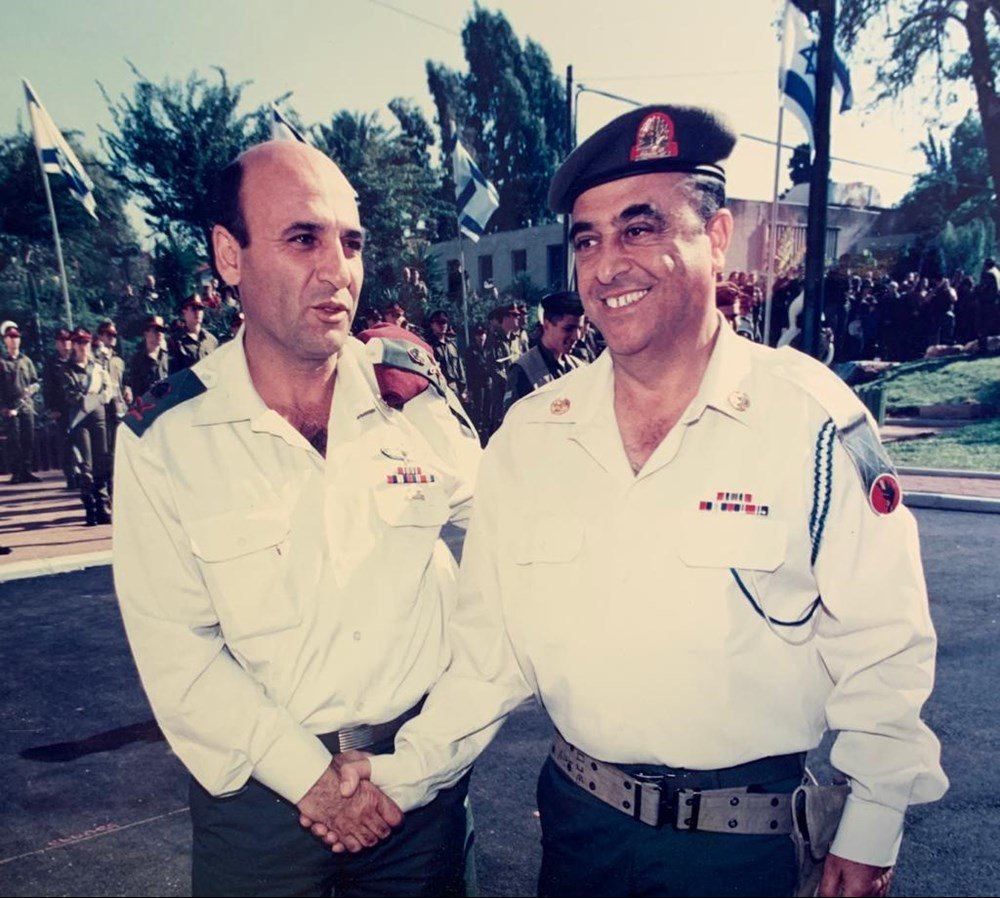
Taito with chief of staff Shaul Mofaz.

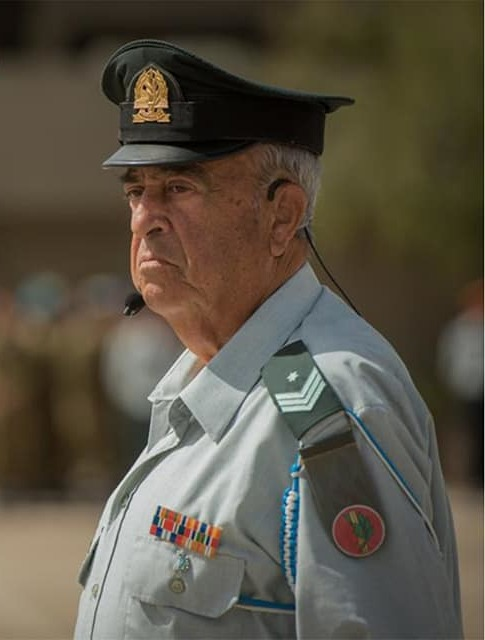

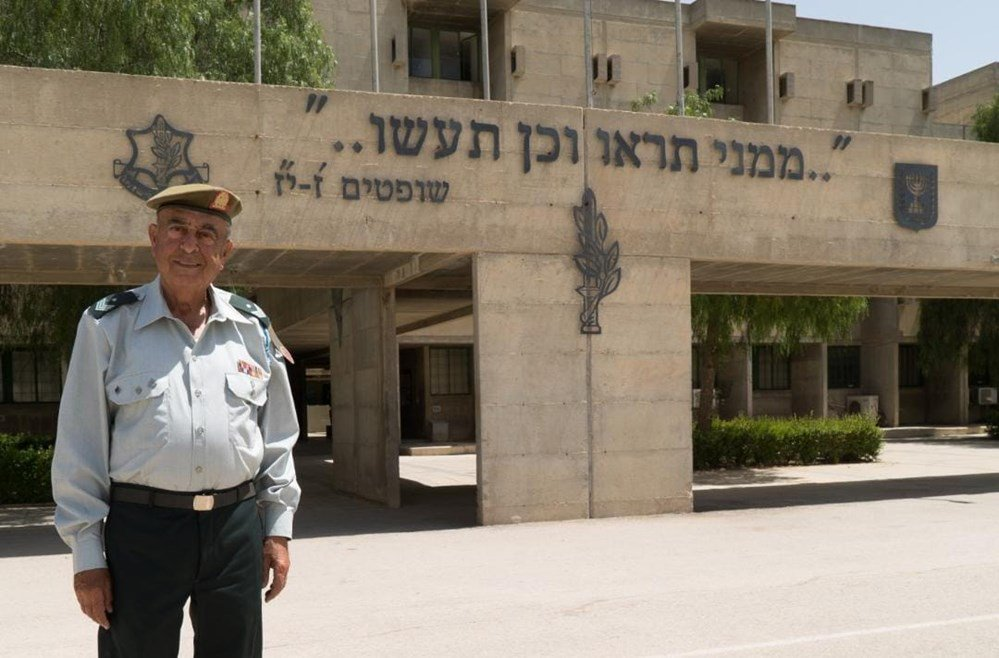

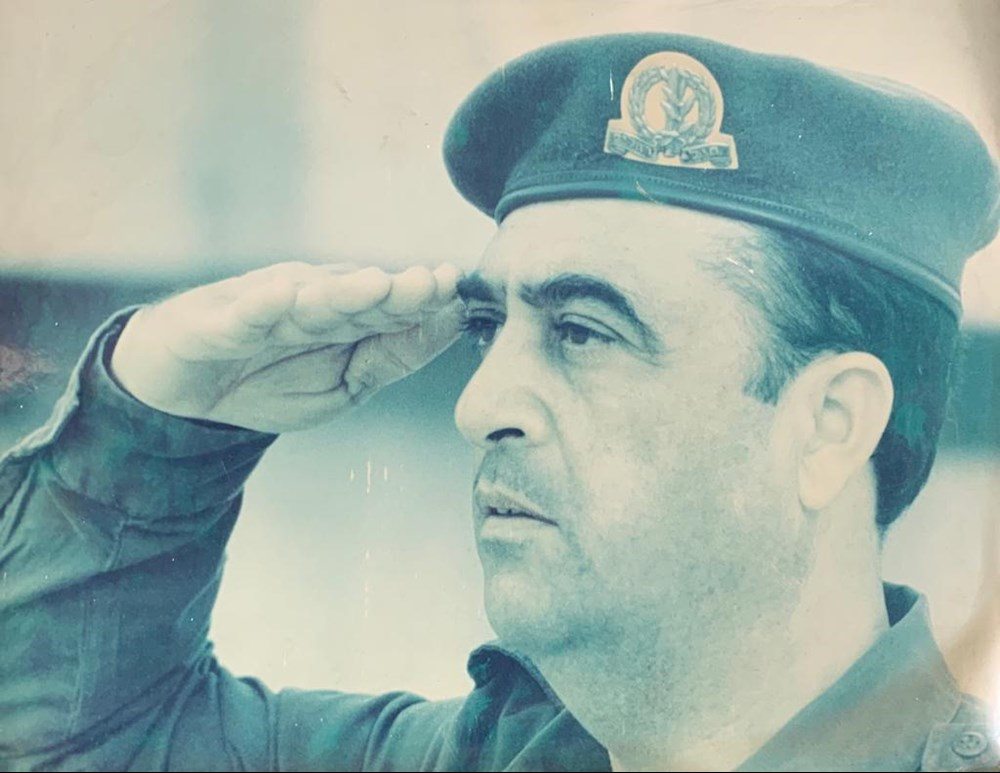

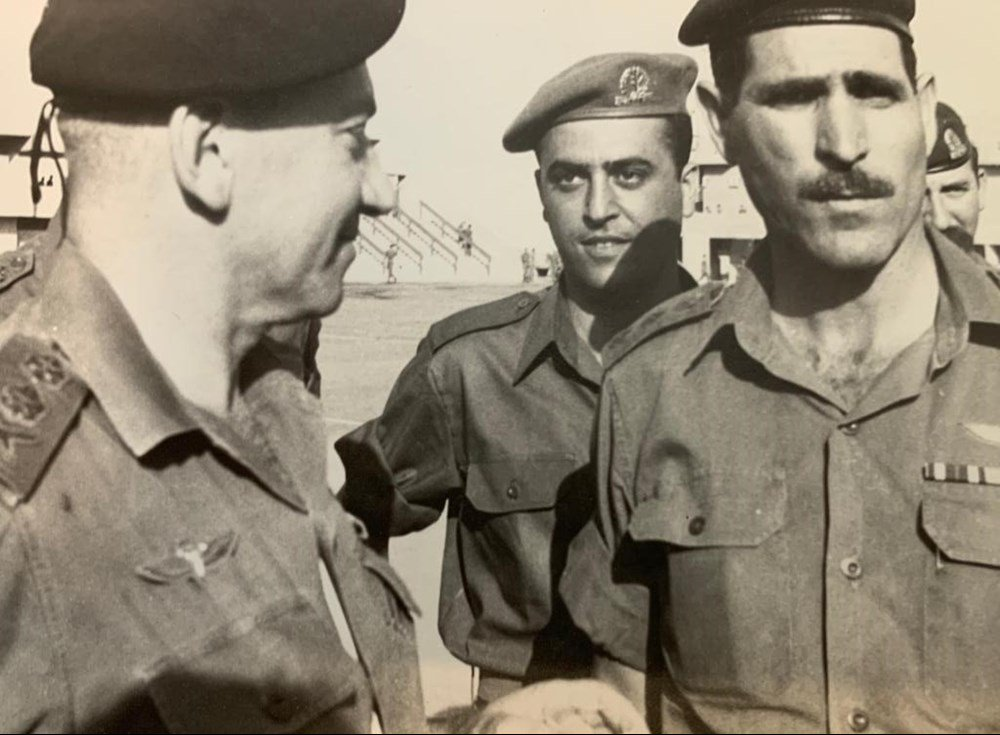
Taito with chief of staff Haim Bar-Lev
