= Every Time We Say Goodbye (film) =

1986 film by Moshé Mizrahi

- Theatrical release poster
- Directed by: Moshé Mizrahi
- Written by: Moshé Mizrahi; Rachel Fabien; Leah Appet
- Produced by: Sharon Harel; Jacob Kotzky
- Starring: Tom Hanks; Cristina Marsillach; Benedict Taylor; Anat Atzmon; Gila Almagor; Alon Abutbul
- Music by: Philippe Sarde
- Production companies: Tri-Star Pictures; Delphi V Productions
- Distributed by: Tri-Star Pictures
- Release date: November 14, 1986
- Running time: 95 minutes
- Country: United States
- Languages: English; Judezmo
- Budget: $3.7 million
- Box office: $278,623

Every Time We Say Goodbye is a 1986 American drama film starring Tom Hanks and Cristina Marsillach. Hanks plays a gentile American in the Royal Air Force, stationed in mandatory Jerusalem, who falls in love with a girl from a Sephardic Jewish family.

The film has the unusual distinction of being partly in the Ladino language. With young lovers of very different backgrounds with religious and cultural differences, the film is an account of a forbidden love.

== Plot ==
Lt. David Bradley is an American pilot who joins the Royal Air Force (RAF) before the United States enters World War II. After his North American P-51 Mustang is shot down in North Africa, he recovers from his leg injury in Jerusalem.

He is transferred to a boarding house until his leg is fully functional. During his recovery, David meets Sarah Perrara, a serene girl of Spanish Jewish descent. Her cousin, Victoria, has convinced her young cousin to accompany her as an alibi, as she wants to meet up with her RAF boyfriend, Peter.

Peter and Victoria tell David and Sarah of their upcoming wedding plans. When David is told beforehand, he tries to discourage his friend from making the serious commitment. Sarah does not approve either, reminding Victoria of the problems that it would create for her in the family.

When a drunk Australian serviceman tries to force Sarah to kiss him, her cousin, Nessim, pops out of nowhere to aid her while David knocks him out by breaking his cane over his head. She rushes off, angry that her cousin was watching her.

David feigns not knowing Sarah, to protect Victoria and Peter. Nessim, grateful for David's help, invites him for a drink. There, he confesses that he has been in love with Sarah since she was small. She is now 18, so he is hopeful. Nessim invites David to Sabbath dinner so that Sarah can thank him properly.

At the dinner, David sits among Sarah's many Sephardic relatives. He is inundated with questions, at which time he reveals that he is a minister's son. The grandmother declares that he is a good man who will live a long life. Afterward, Sarah thanks David, for help with both the Australian and for maintaining Victoria's secret.

Although Sarah and David are attracted to each other, she is convinced that their diverse backgrounds mean that it could never work, so she refuses to go on a date with him. David tries to formally ask for her family's permission, but they disapprove, mostly because he is the gentile son of a Protestant minister. Soon realizing their disapproval, David makes a quick exit.

David and Sarah next see each other at Peter and Victoria's brief wedding. Although they keep running into each other in the small community, they part as frequently as they meet. They take a walk; when David asks Sarah to definitively tell him whether she wants him to leave her alone. After saying yes, she kisses him on the mouth for the first time.

The next day, as Nessim again speaks of loving her and of their possible future wedding, Sarah implies that she may love someone else. At a boxing match of one her relatives, she tells him that she is leaving, then connects with David. Going for a walk, they dance briefly and kiss. Needing to see her again, David insists that they meet again, which one of her brothers witnesses. Sarah talks to her grandmother about her dilemma. The older woman senses her turmoil, but cannot offer any advice.

After David and Sarah spend the day together on a day trip out of town, he takes her to his boarding house. They are nearly intimate, but she again backs out. Before he is able to take her home, several of her younger family burst in, knock him out and drag her away.

Sarah is confined to her house, and they confiscate her clothes. A brother helps her sneak out; she goes to David's boarding house, and they spend the night together. Before he awakens, Sarah goes to Nessim's and, despite loving David, asks him to marry her. They make wedding plans while David is away in Egypt. He returns as he had promised, two days before the wedding. Just before he has to return, Sarah catches up to him. She promises that she will wait for him and write. They kiss and he flies away.

== Cast ==
- Tom Hanks as David
- Cristina Marsillach as Sarah
- Benedict Taylor as Peter
- Anat Atzmon as Victoria
- Gila Almagor as Lea
- Avner Hiskyahu as Raphael
- Moni Moshonov as Nessim (credited as Monny Moshonov)
- Alon Abutbul as Joseph (credited as Alan Abovtboul)

== Production ==
After his breakout role in Splash, Tom Hanks signed to star in Every Time We Say Goodbye. The drama was a departure from his earlier comedic television and screen roles. Hanks was also ready to devote time to establishing a more serious catalog, but, in contrast to the Hollywood films that he had worked on, he considered Every Time We Say Goodbye, at $3.7 million, a "low-budget" production. Much of the film was shot on location in Israel, including in the King David Hotel, Jerusalem.

== Reception ==
At the time, Every Time We Say Goodbye was considered to be the most expensive Israeli film ($3.7 million). However, the film was a box-office bomb, with a worldwide gross of only $278,623. To this day, according to Box Office Mojo, it remains the lowest-grossing theatrically released film starring Hanks. Reviews of the film were lukewarm at best, and the film had a limited release in theaters.

Film critic Janet Maslin of The New York Times gave the film a negative review, saying, "Tom Hanks is utterly out of place in the Israeli romance Every Time We Say Goodbye for at least two reasons: because there's something so innately comic about him, even in solemn surroundings, and because he has so much more energy than the film does."
