= Marsillach =

Marsillach is a surname. Notable people with the surname include:

- Adolfo Marsillach (1928–2002), Spanish actor
- Cristina Marsillach (born 1963), Spanish actress
