= The Trap (1985 film) =

1985 film directed by Giuseppe Patroni Griffi

- Italian theatrical release poster
- Directed by: Giuseppe Patroni Griffi
- Screenplay by: Lucio Fulci; Alberto Silvestri; Concha Hombria
- Story by: Francesco Barilli
- Produced by: Juan L. Isasi; Ettore Spagnuolo
- Starring: Laura Antonelli; Tony Musante; Florinda Bolkan
- Cinematography: Juan Amorós; Hans Burman
- Edited by: Sergio Montanari
- Music by: Ennio Morricone
- Release date: September 12, 1985
- Running time: 97 minutes
- Countries: Italy; Spain
- Language: Italian

The Trap (Italian: La Gabbia) is a 1985 film directed by Giuseppe Patroni Griffi and starring Tony Musante, Laura Antonelli, and Florinda Bolkan.

Famed Italian horror director Lucio Fulci contributed to the screenplay (this film was done during the time Fulci was recovering from hepatitis, so he was unable to direct it).

== Plot ==
Michael Parker is a successful American businessman living in Italy with his girlfriend Hélène. However, when she leaves on vacation, Michael soon becomes involved in an affair with Marie, a woman he once had a fling with. This affair proves more difficult for Michael, as Marie is not going to let him off the hook again so easily. To complicate matters worse, Marie's young daughter Jacqueline also finds herself attracted to Michael, resulting in a love triangle.

== Cast ==
- Laura Antonelli as Marie Colbert
- Tony Musante as Michael Parker
- Florinda Bolkan as Hélène Marcò
- Blanca Marsillach as Jacqueline
- Cristina Marsillach as Marie (young)
- Laura Troschel as Marianne

== Production ==
The film is based on a story called ""L'Occhio" (lit. 'The Eye') written by filmmaker Francesco Barilli. Barilli intended to make the film himself, but had trouble securing backing and balked at the producers wanting Shelley Winters in the lead role. So he sold the idea to Patroni Griffi and let him produce and direct it, retitling it The Trap. Barilli said of the finished product "Lets' talk frankly here, that movie sucks...." and Fulci even used profanity alluding to his opinion of Patroni Griffi, who he felt stole his chance to direct the film.

Fulci had fell ill due to a viral hepatitis and cirrhosis of the liver by the end of 1984 and was unable to make the film. He later directed a similar film titled The Devil's Honey a few months after.

== Release and reception ==
La Gabbia was released on September 12 in Milan and Tornio and the next day in Genova and Rome. In Spain, the film was released as La jaula. It as released on home video in the United Kingdom as The Trap and in the United States as Collector's Item.

The film received unenthusiastic reviews in Paese Sera, L'Unita, Il Giorno and Il Giornale Nuovo.

== See also ==
- List of Italian films of 1985
