= Blanca Marsillach =

Spanish theatre producer and actress (born 1966)

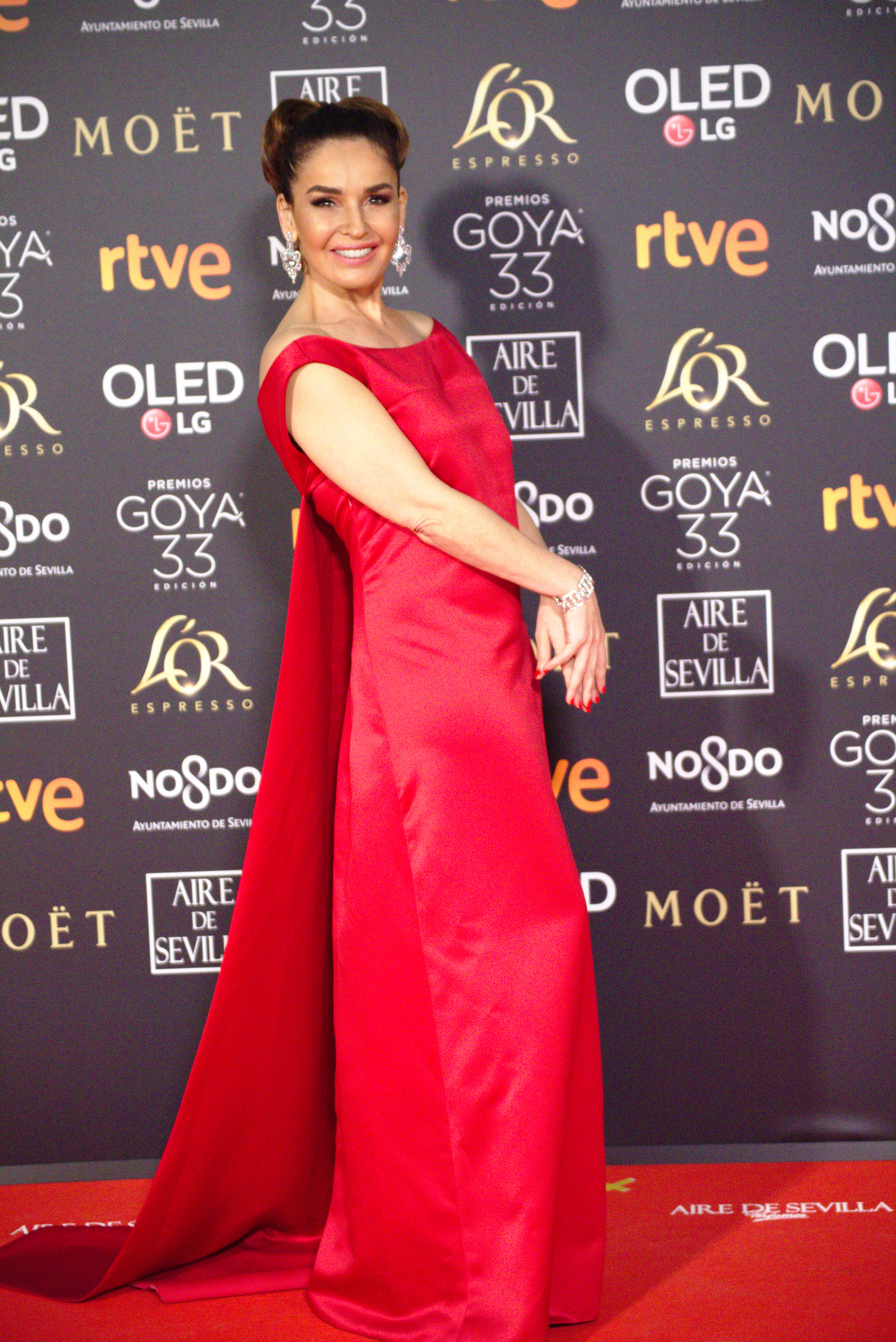
- At the 33rd Goya Awards' photocall in 2019
- Born: Blanca Marsillach del Río; 23 March 1966 (age 59); Barcelona, Spain
- Occupations: Theatrical producer; actress; businesswoman
- Father: Adolfo Marsillach
- Relatives: Cristina Marsillach (sister)

Blanca Marsillach del Río (born 23 March 1966) is a Spanish theatrical producer, actress, and businesswoman.

== Biography ==
Born in Barcelona on 23 March 1966, daughter to Adolfo Marsillach and Teresa del Río, Blanca Marsillach del Río was raised in Madrid's neighborhood of El Viso. Her older sister Cristina is also an actress. She earned a degree in drama from the University of Southern California. She also studied economics. After making early stage appearances under his father's guidance, she featured in Pedro Masó's television series Segunda enseñanza (1986), and Paul Verhoeven's adventure film Flesh and Blood (1985).

She created a theatre company in the United States, and also starred in plays such as Fool for Love, The Trojan Women and A Midsummer Night's Dream, later returning to Spain, where she developed a career as a theatrical producer, bringing forward stagings of Las entretenidas, La noche al desnudo, and Con las alas cortadas. She also starred as Myrtle in the play El reino de la tierra (which was also adapted by her alongside Elise Varela).

== Filmography (actress) ==
Film
| Year | Title | Role | Notes | Ref |
|---|---|---|---|---|
| 1985 | Flesh+Blood | | | |
| 1985 | La gabbia (The Trap) | Jacqueline | | |
| 1986 | La monja alférez (The Lieutenant Nun) | Catalina (adolescent) | Adult version of the character played by Esperanza Roy | |
| 1986 | Il miele del diavolo (The Devil's Honey) | Jessica | | |
| 1987 | I picari (The Rogues) | Ponzia | | |
| 1999 | Hijos del viento | Zaabai | | |
| 2003 | Cosa de brujas (The Witch Affair) | Elisa | | |
| 2006 | GAL | Moderadora del debate | | |
| 2006 | Day of Wrath | Carmen de Jaramillo | | |

Awards
| Year | Film | Nomations | No. of Awards |
|---|---|---|---|
| 1987 | The Rouges | 1 | - |
| 1987 | Lieutenant Nun | 1 | - |
| 2003 | The Wich Affair | 1 | - |
| 2002 | The Other Side Of The Bed | 11 | 5 |
