= Arthur Kennedy =

American actor (1914–1990)

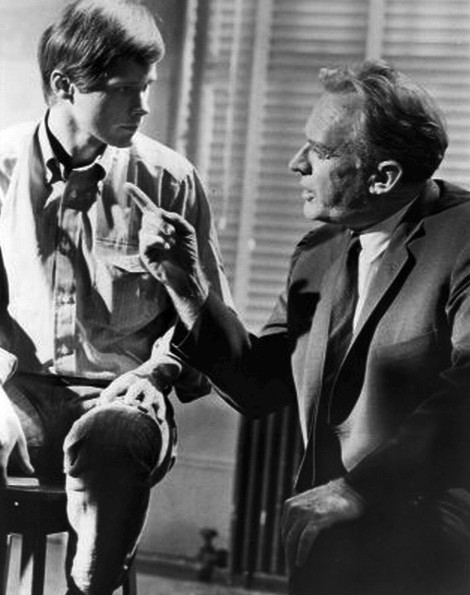
- Kennedy (right) in Stage 67 (1966)
- Born: John Arthur Kennedy; February 17, 1914; Worcester, Massachusetts, U.S.
- Died: January 5, 1990 (aged 75); Branford, Connecticut, U.S.
- Education: Carnegie Mellon University (BFA)
- Occupation: Actor
- Years active: 1937–1990
- Spouse: Mary Cheffey (m. 1938; died 1975)
- Children: 2, including Laurie
- Awards: See below

John Arthur Kennedy (February 17, 1914 – January 5, 1990) was an American actor, known for his versatility in supporting film roles and his ability to create "an exceptional honesty and naturalness on stage", especially in the original casts of Arthur Miller plays on Broadway.

Over his career, Kennedy was nominated for five Academy Awards (four for Best Supporting Actor, once for Best Actor). He won the 1949 Tony Award for Best Featured Actor in a Play for Miller's Death of a Salesman, and the Golden Globe for Best Supporting Actor for the 1955 film Trial.

== Early life and education ==
Kennedy was born on February 17, 1914, in Worcester, Massachusetts, the son of Helen (née Thompson) and John Timothy "J.T." Kennedy, a dentist. He attended South High School, Worcester, and graduated from Worcester Academy. He studied drama at the Carnegie Institute of Technology in Pittsburgh, Pennsylvania, graduating with a B.A. in 1934.

== Career ==
Kennedy moved to New York City and, billed as John Kennedy, joined the Group Theatre. He then toured with a classical repertory company. In September 1937, he made his Broadway debut as Bushy in Maurice Evans' Richard II at the St. James Theatre. In 1939 he played Sir Richard Vernon in Evans' Henry IV, Part 1.

Kennedy's first film role was of James Cagney's younger brother in City for Conquest in 1940. He appeared in many Western films and police dramas.

Kennedy appeared in many notable films from the early 1940s through mid-1960s, including High Sierra, Champion, They Died with Their Boots On, The Glass Menagerie, The Desperate Hours, Trial, Peyton Place, Some Came Running, A Summer Place, Elmer Gantry, The Man from Laramie, Barabbas, Lawrence of Arabia, Nevada Smith and Fantastic Voyage.

Of Kennedy's film work, he is perhaps best-remembered for his collaborations with director Anthony Mann and co-star James Stewart on Bend of the River (1952) and The Man from Laramie (1955), in both of which he played sympathetic villains.

He also enjoyed a distinguished stage career over the same period, receiving a Tony Award for his role of Biff Loman in Arthur Miller's Death of a Salesman (1949). He inaugurated three other major characters in Miller plays: Chris Keller in All My Sons (1947), John Proctor in The Crucible (1953) and Walter Franz in The Price (1968). In 1961 he played the title role in Becket, opposite Laurence Olivier as Henry II.

On February 5, 1959, Kennedy appeared on the episode "Make It Look Good" of CBS's Dick Powell's Zane Grey Theatre.

In 1974, Kennedy was a regular on the short-lived ABC police drama Nakia, as Sheriff Sam Jericho.

With the death of his wife in 1975, failing eyesight, alcoholism, and thyroid cancer, Kennedy was reported as having lost interest in acting. After 1979's The Humanoid, Kennedy retired from acting for a decade, until 1989's Signs of Life.

== Honors ==
Kennedy has two stars on the Hollywood Walk of Fame: one for Motion Pictures at 6681 Hollywood Boulevard and one for Television at 1620 Vine Street.

== Personal life ==
Kennedy married Mary Cheffey in March 1938. They had two children: actress Laurie Kennedy and Terence.

=== Death ===
During the last years of his life, Kennedy had thyroid cancer and eye disease. He spent much of his later life in Savannah, Georgia, out of the public eye. He died of cancer on January 5, 1990 at age 75.

== Filmography ==
=== Film ===
- City for Conquest (1940) as Eddie Kenny
- High Sierra (1941) as Red
- Knockout (1941) as Johnny Rocket
- Strange Alibi (1941) as Joe Geary
- Bad Men of Missouri (1941) as Jim Younger
- Highway West (1941) as George Foster
- They Died with Their Boots On (1941) as Ned Sharp
- Desperate Journey (1942) as Flying Officer Jed Forrest
- Reconnaissance Pilot (1943, documentary short) as Decoration Announcer (voice, uncredited)
- Resisting Enemy Interrogation (1944) as Sgt. Alfred Mason (uncredited)
- Ditch and Live (1944, Short) as Captain Scott H. Reynolds (uncredited)
- Time to Kill (1945, Short) as Narrator (uncredited)
- Target – Invisible (1945, documentary short) as Narrator (uncredited)
- Devotion (1946) as Branwell Brontë
- It's Your America (1946, Short) as Soldier (uncredited)
- Boomerang (1947) as John Waldron
- Cheyenne (1947) as Chalk
- The Walking Hills (1949) as Chalk
- Champion (1949) as Connie
- The Window (1949) as Ed Woodry
- Too Late for Tears (1949) as Alan Palmer
- Chicago Deadline (1949) as Tommy Ditman
- The Glass Menagerie (1950) as Tom Wingfield
- Bright Victory (1951) as Larry Nevins
- Red Mountain (1951) as Lane Waldron
- Bend of the River (1952) as Emerson Cole
- Rancho Notorious (1952) as Vern Haskell
- The Girl in White (1952) as Dr. Ben Barringer
- The Lusty Men (1952) as Wes Merritt
- Impulse (1954) as Alan Curtis
- Crashout (1955) as Joe Quinn
- The Man From Laramie (1955) as Vic Hansbro
- The Desperate Hours (1955) as Deputy Sheriff Jesse Bard
- Trial (1955) as Barney
- The Naked Dawn (1955) as Santiago
- The Rawhide Years (1956) as Rick Harper
- Peyton Place (1957) as Lucas Cross
- Twilight for the Gods (1958) as First Mate Ramsay
- Some Came Running (1958) as Frank Hirsh
- Home Is the Hero (1959) as Willie O'Reilly
- A Summer Place (1959) as Bart Hunter
- Elmer Gantry (1960) as Jim Lefferts
- Claudelle Inglish (1961) as Clyde Inglish
- Murder, She Said (1961) as Dr. Quimper
- Barabbas (1961) as Pontius Pilate
- Hemingway's Adventures of a Young Man (1962) as Dr. Adams
- Lawrence of Arabia (1962) as Jackson Bentley
- Attack and Retreat (1964) as Ferro Maria Ferri
- Cheyenne Autumn (1964) as Doc Holliday
- Murieta (1965) as Capt. Love
- Joy in the Morning (1965) as Patrick Brown
- Nevada Smith (1966) as Bill Bowdre
- Fantastic Voyage (1966) as Dr. Duval
- Monday's Child (1967) as Peter Richardson
- Day of the Evil Gun (1968) as Owen Forbes
- A Minute to Pray, a Second to Die (1968) as Tuscosa Marshal Roy W. Colby
- Anzio (1968) as Maj. Gen. Jack Lesley
- Hail, Hero! (1969) as Albert Dixon
- Shark! (1969) as Doc
- My Old Man's Place (1971) as Walter Pell
- I Kiss the Hand (1973) as Don Angelino Ferrante
- Ricco the Mean Machine (1973) as Don Vito
- Let Sleeping Corpses Lie (1974) as The Inspector
- The Antichrist (1974) as Bishop Ascanio Oderisi
- Killer Cop (1975) as Armando Di Federico
- The Tough Ones (1976) as Ruini
- As of Tomorrow (1976) as Mike Jannacone
- La spiaggia del desiderio (1976) as Antonio
- The Sentinel (1977) as Monsignor Franchino
- Nine Guests for a Crime (1977) as Uberto
- Gli ultimi angeli (1978) as Uncle
- Bermuda: Cave of the Sharks (1978) as Mr. Jackson
- Cyclone (1978) as The Priest
- Porco mondo (1978) as Senator Merelli
- Covert Action (1978) as Maxwell
- The Humanoid (1979) as Dr. Kraspin
- Signs of Life (1989) as Owen Coughlin
- Grandpa (1990) (final film role)

=== Television ===
- Ford Theatre (1954, 1 episode) as Larry Morton
- Ethel Barrymore Theatre (1956, 1 episode)
- Schilling Playhouse (1958, 1 episode)
- The Ten Commandments (1959, TV Movie)
- Dick Powell's Zane Grey Theatre (1959, 1 episode) as Sam Carter
- Our American Heritage (1959-60, 2 episodes) as Alexander Hamilton
- General Electric Theater (1960, 1 episode) as Whitney Barton)
- Playhouse 90 (1960, 1 episode) as Paul Heller
- NBC Sunday Showcase (1960, 1 episode) as Alexander Hamilton
- Alcoa Premiere (1961, 1 episode) as Dr. Harry A. Wilmer
- The DuPont Show of the Week (1962-64, 2 episodes) as Hans Maasdijk, Colin Ryan
- Espionage (1963, 1 episode) as Ed Pierce
- Kraft Suspense Theatre (1964, 1 episode) as Dr. Walter Meade Taylor
- Suspense (1964, 1 episode) as Sgt. Mike Kenny
- Alfred Hitchcock Presents (1964, 1 episode) as Keith Hollands
- ABC Stage 67 (1966, 2 episodes) as Lt. Hammond, Narrator
- CBS Playhouse (1969, 1 episode) as Rome
- The Movie Murderer (1970, TV Movie) as Angus MacGregor
- A Death of Innocence (1971, TV Movie) as Mark Hirsch
- Crawlspace (1972, TV Movie) as Albert Graves
- The Man from Independence (1974, TV Movie) as Tom Pendergast
- The President's Plane Is Missing (1973, TV Movie) as Gunther Damon
- Nakia (1974, 14 episodes) as Sheriff Sam Jericho
- I figli del vento (1989, TV Movie)

== Awards and nominations ==
| Institution | Year | Category | Work | Result | Refs. |
|---|---|---|---|---|---|
| Academy Awards | 1950 | Best Supporting Actor | Champion | Nominated | |
| Academy Awards | 1952 | Best Actor | Bright Victory | Nominated | |
| Academy Awards | 1956 | Best Supporting Actor | Trial | Nominated | |
| Academy Awards | 1958 | Best Supporting Actor | Peyton Place | Nominated | |
| Academy Awards | 1959 | Best Supporting Actor | Some Came Running | Nominated | |
| Golden Globes | 1952 | Best Actor in a Motion Picture – Drama | Bright Victory | Nominated | |
| Golden Globes | 1956 | Best Supporting Actor – Motion Picture | Trial | Won | |
| Laurel Awards | 1958 | Top Male Supporting Performance | Peyton Place | Nominated | |
| Laurel Awards | 1959 | Top Male Supporting Performance | Some Came Running | Nominated | |
| Laurel Awards | 1960 | Top Male Supporting Performance | A Summer Place | Nominated | |
| New York Film Critics Circle | 1951 | Best Actor | Bright Victory | Won | |
| Tony Awards | 1949 | Best Featured Actor in a Play | Death of a Salesman | Won | |
