= Kleinhoff Hotel =

- Directed by: Carlo Lizzani
- Written by: Valentino Orsini; Faliero Rosati
- Cinematography: Gábor Pogány
- Edited by: Franco Fraticelli
- Music by: Giorgio Gaslini
- Release date: 1977
- Running time: 105 minutes
- Country: Italy
- Language: Italian

Kleinhoff Hotel is a 1977 erotic drama film directed by Carlo Lizzani.

== Plot ==
Pascale is a rich and beautiful French lady married to an architect, both often traveling around the world for work and then far away from each other. In just one of these circumstances, Pascale loses her plane to London and is forced to stay in Berlin. She chooses to stay at the Kleinhoff Hotel, where she had lived as a student years earlier. The room next to her is occupied by Alex, a young fugitive terrorist hunted by German police and instructed by his group to eliminate Pedro, a suspected traitor.

The curiosity and attraction to Alex become so overwhelming that Pascale renounces to her departure for London in order to stalk the young terrorist.

== Cast ==
- Corinne Cléry: Pascale Rostand
- Bruce Robinson: Karl aka Alex
- Katja Rupé: Petra
- Werner Pochath: David
- Peter Kern: Erich Müller
- Michele Placido: Pedro

== Production ==
At the time this film came out, newspaper advertisements said it contained unsimulated sex. Corinne Cléry, the main actress, sued the distribution and production companies, complaining that the advertisement had damaged her private and professional life. On the other hand, the two companies defended themselves and brought as testimony a series of photos from the set showing "the beginning of the sexual act, complete with insertion".
