= Mini Israel =

Miniature park in central Israel

Coordinates: 31°50′32.97″N 34°58′2.1″E

- Native name: מיני ישראל
- Founded: 2002; 24 years ago
- Headquarters: Latrun, Jerusalem District
- Website: minisrael.co.il

Mini Israel (Hebrew: מיני ישראל) is a miniature park located near Latrun in the Jerusalem District within the Ayalon Valley. Opened in November 2002, the site contains miniature replicas of hundreds of buildings and landmarks in Israel. The tourist attraction consists of about 350 miniaturize models of notable buildings. The scale of 1:25 produces skyscrapers which sit at adult height and historic churches around the height of a child.

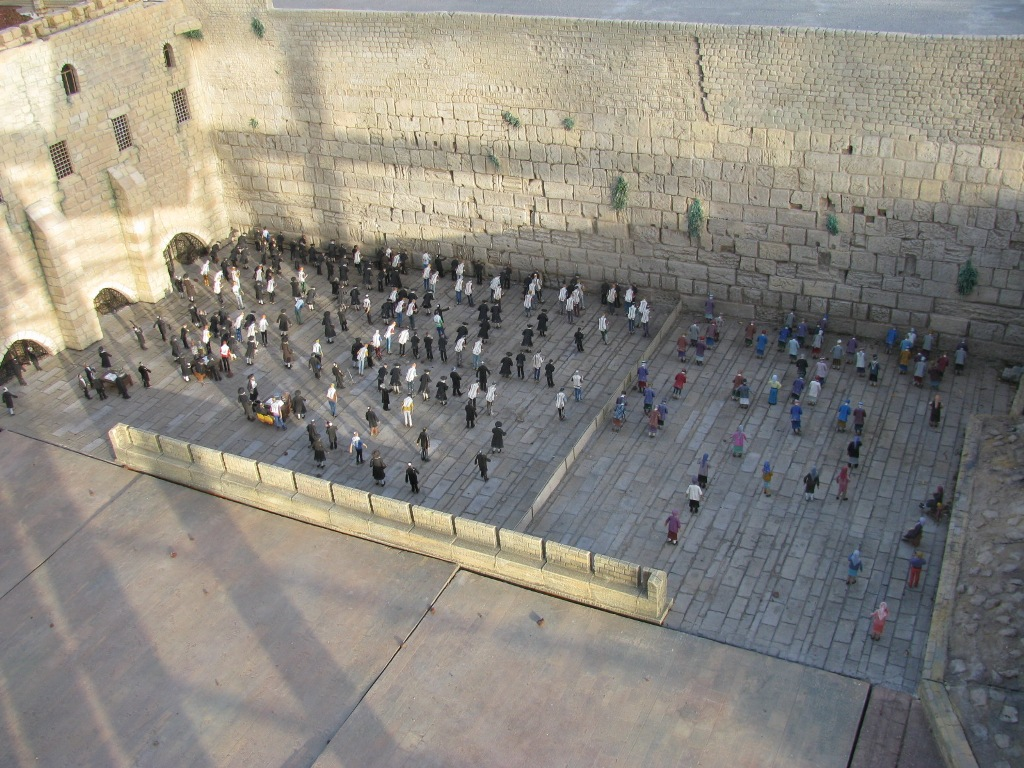
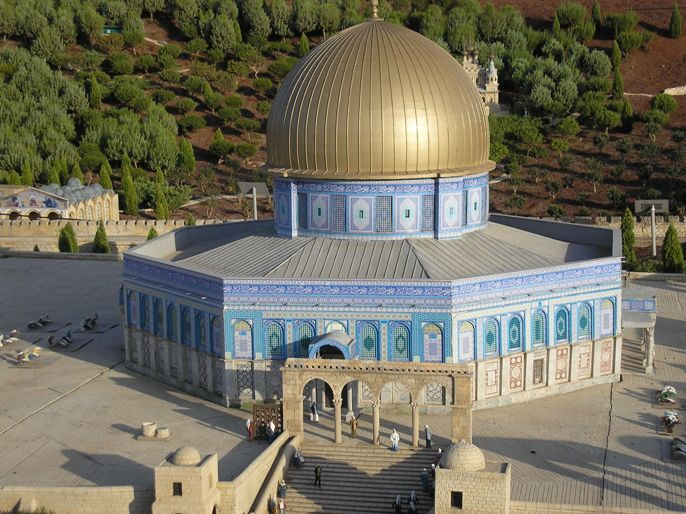
The Western Wall and Dome of the Rock at Mini Israel

== Overview ==
The permanent exhibition shows the main sites and structures in Israel of importance to Judaism, Christianity, and Islam. The sites are of historical, archeological, cultural, religious, and ethnic importance, depicting the sites and the ethnic groups associated with them, such as different Muslim cultural groups, Jews and Christians living in the country, but also Druze, Bedouin and others. The signs are in Hebrew, Arabic, and English. 95% of the visitors are Israeli.

The complex covers 60,000 square metres (14.8 acres), with the models displayed over 35,000 sq m (8.6 acres). The park also includes a souvenir shop, a few restaurants and rest areas, and a hall for lectures and meetings in which a film about the creation of the park is displayed. An audio guide and motorised buggies are available.

== History ==
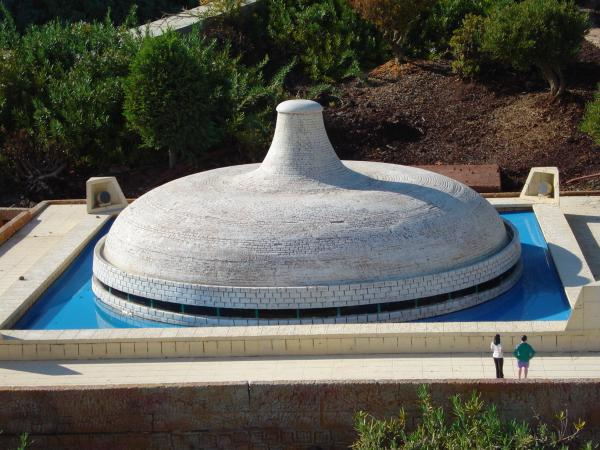
Shrine of the Book

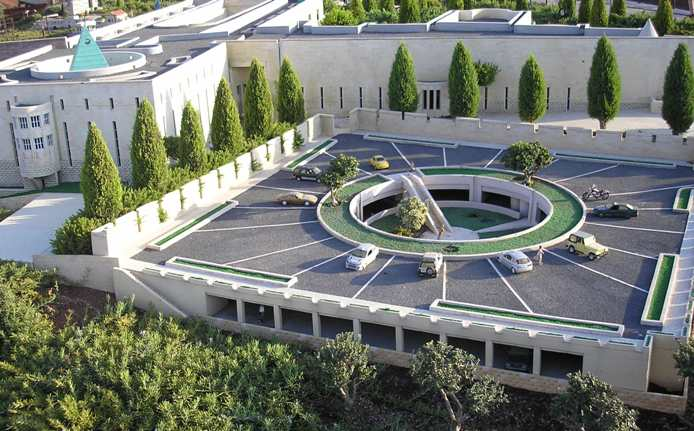
Israeli Supreme Court building

The slogan since its inception has been "See it all - small". The designers, architects and model builder team consisted of over 100 people from all parts of Israeli society and religions, including many new immigrants from the former USSR. The park was the brainchild of Israeli entrepreneur Eiran Gazit who conceived the idea after visiting the famous miniature town of Madurodam in the Netherlands in 1986. Delayed by the First Intifada, Gazit began plans to build the park in 1994. The park was created by Gazit and his partners, with Yoni Shapira serving as creative and marketing director, Mike Madeson in charge of international projects, and Koby Plashkes as technical director. It was funded mainly by two large investing groups: Granite HaCarmel and Secom of the Shikun Ubinui Group. It cost $20 million USD, with 15% of the funding coming from the Israel Tourism Office. The park was built on land owned by Kibbutz Nachshon. It had 350,000 visitors in its first nine months of opening. A Google Street View of Mini Israel was completed in November 2011, becoming active on April 19, 2012.

== The models ==
The park consists of about 350 buildings and landmarks, 30,000 figures, 500 animals, plants and 15,000 real trees, 4,700 cars, 100 motorbikes, 14 trains, 3 helicopters, 32 aircraft, 175 ships and 230 trucks. All trees are real bonsai cultivated and planted by Agronomy nursery. The park is loosely shaped like a star of David, with each of the six triangles representing an area or city: Jerusalem; Tel Aviv; Haifa; Galil; Negev; Center. Models were created in workshops spread throughout Israel using sophisticated computerized evaluations, based on research prepared by Mini Israel staff.

Most of the buildings were built in the scale of 1:25. Exceptions are Nahalal - 1:250; Orot Rabin power station - 1:50; walls of Jerusalem and Acre reduced to 1:50 leaving their height at 1:25; Knesset Menorah - 1:15

The models are made of polyurethane or similar polymeric materials, and small stones. They were painted with waterproof paint for resistance to weather conditions. Many of the models originally included kinetic moving parts such as trains, planes, a soccer game, heavy equipment & boats. Over the years the exhibits have fallen into disrepair. The kinetic features have not been functional for many years and many of the static models are in poor shape.

== Mass grave ==
On the grounds of the park is the unmarked mass grave of about 80 Egyptian commandos who were killed nearby during the 1967 Six-Day War. The commanders included 25 who were burnt to death in a wild fire. An attempt to publish this information in the 1990s was forbidden by the military censor, but the suppression order was lifted in 2022. After publication in Israeli newspapers, Yedioth Ahronoth and Haaretz, Egyptian president Abdel Fattah al-Sisi raised the issue with Israeli prime minister Yair Lapid, who directed his military secretary, "to examine the issue in-depth and to update Egyptian officials".

== Gallery ==
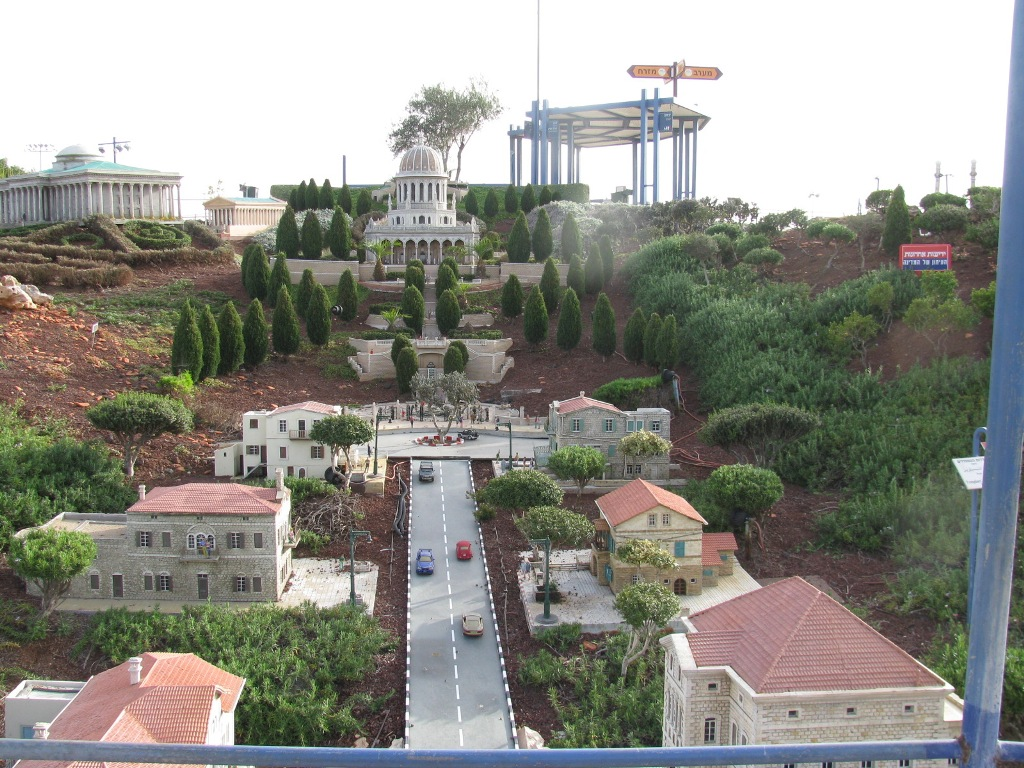
Bahai garden, German Colony, Haifa

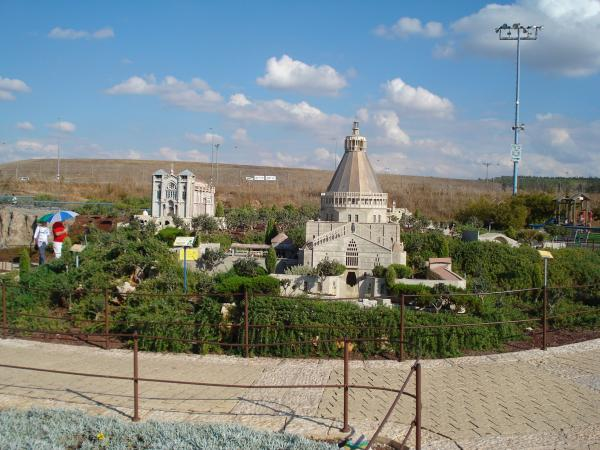
Basilica of the Annunciation and Basilica of Jesus the Adolescent, Nazareth

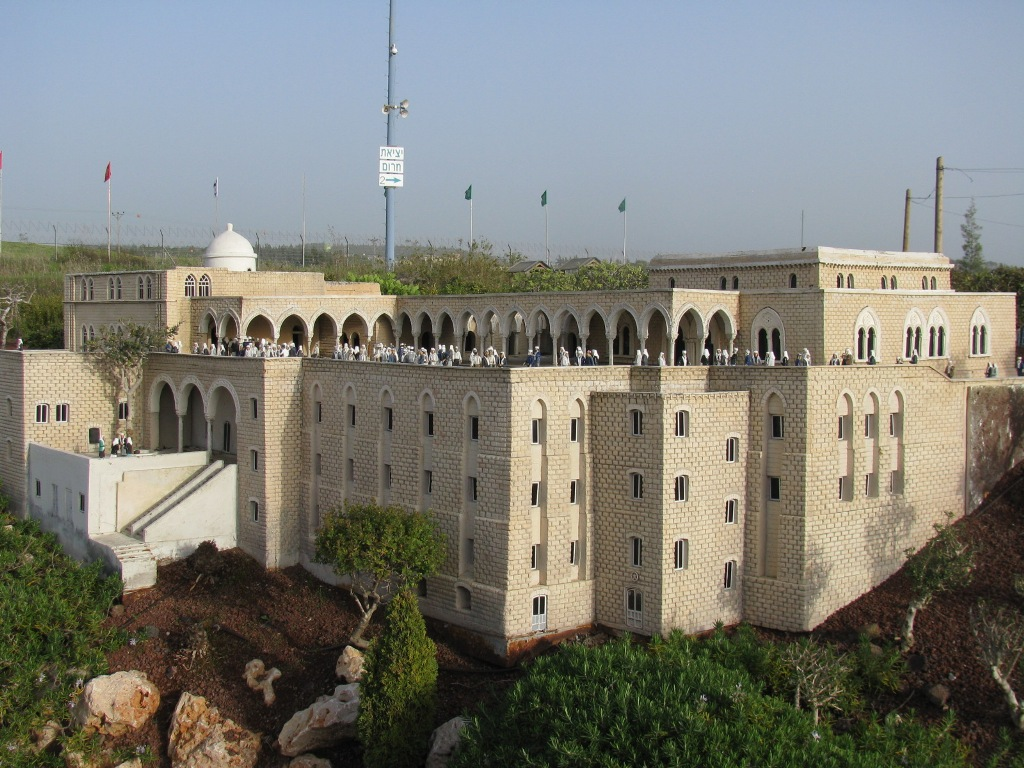
Nabi Shu'ayb, Hittin

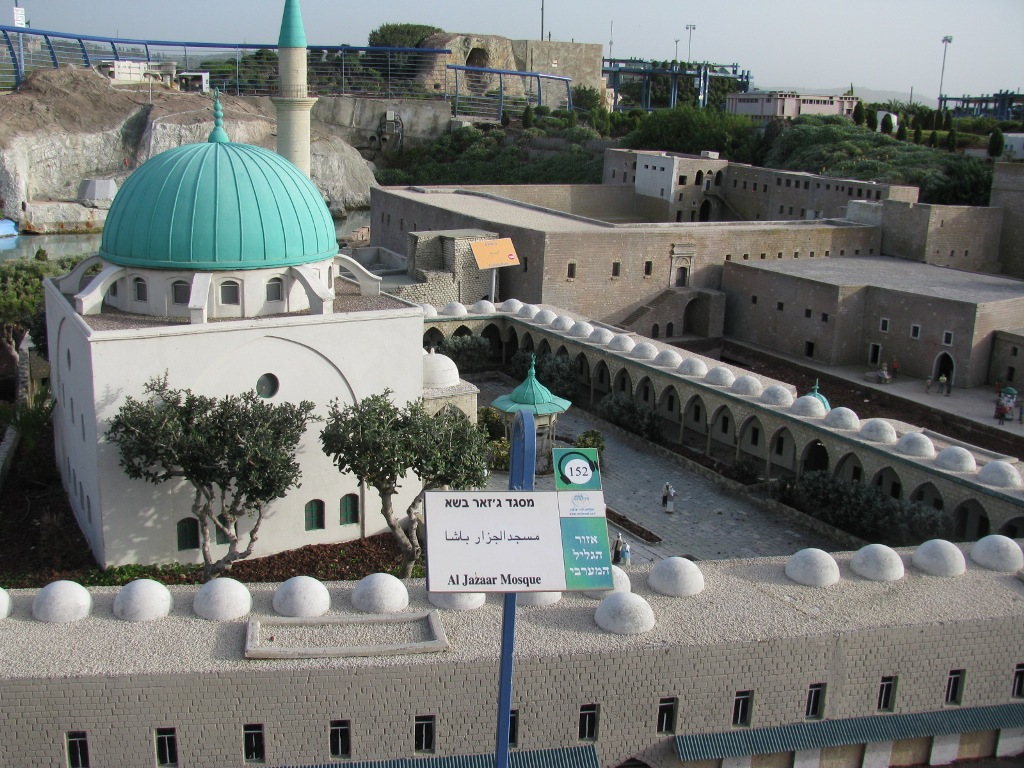
El-Jazzar Mosque, Acre

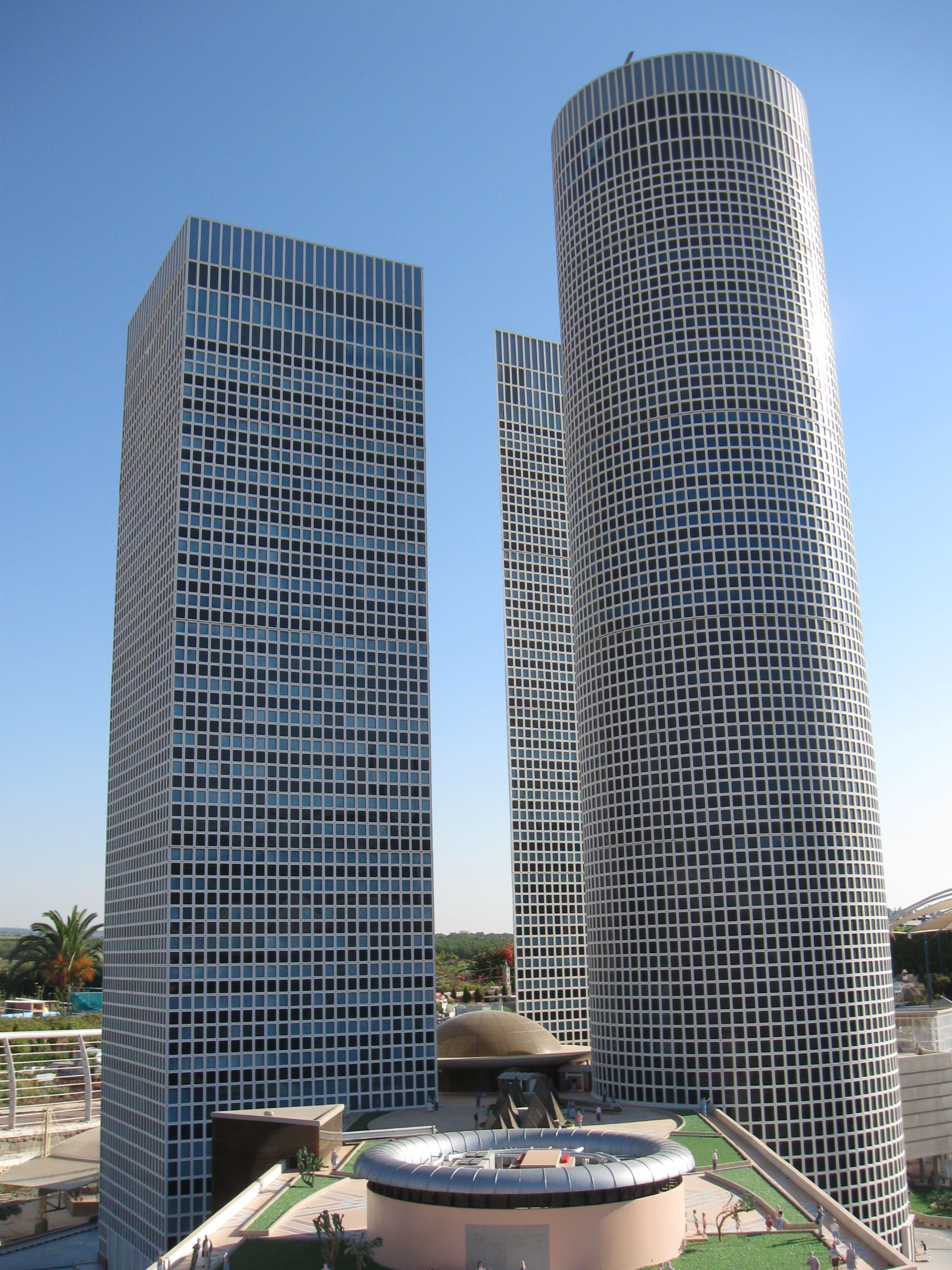
Azrieli Center, Tel Aviv

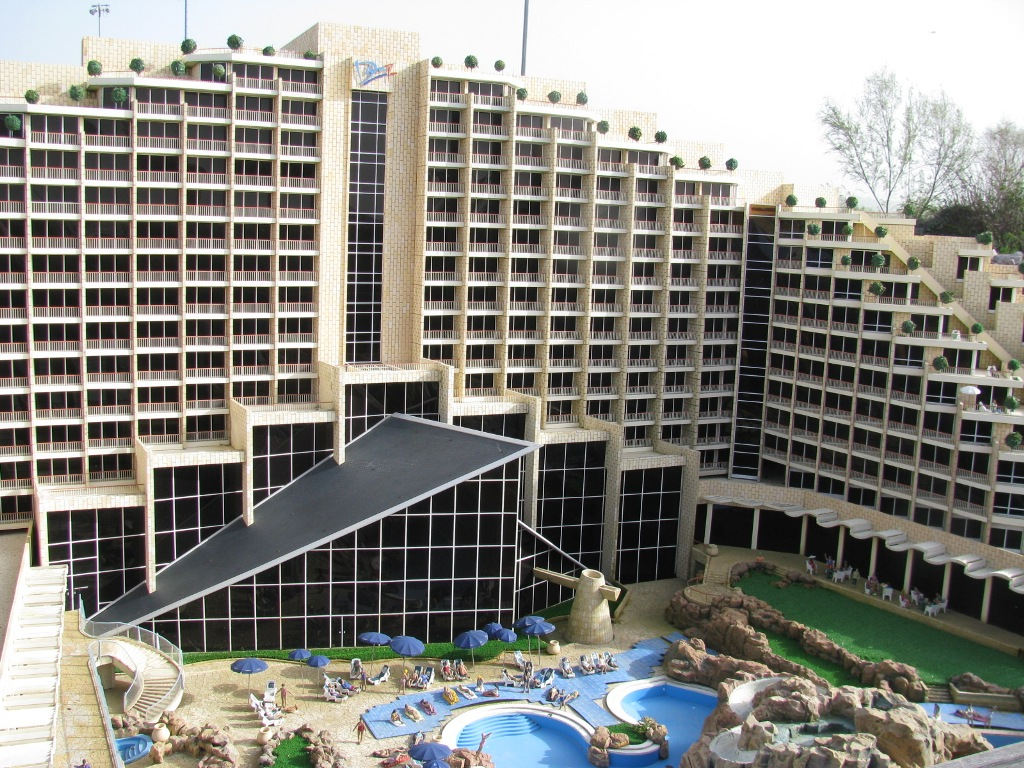
Dan Eilat hotel, Eilat

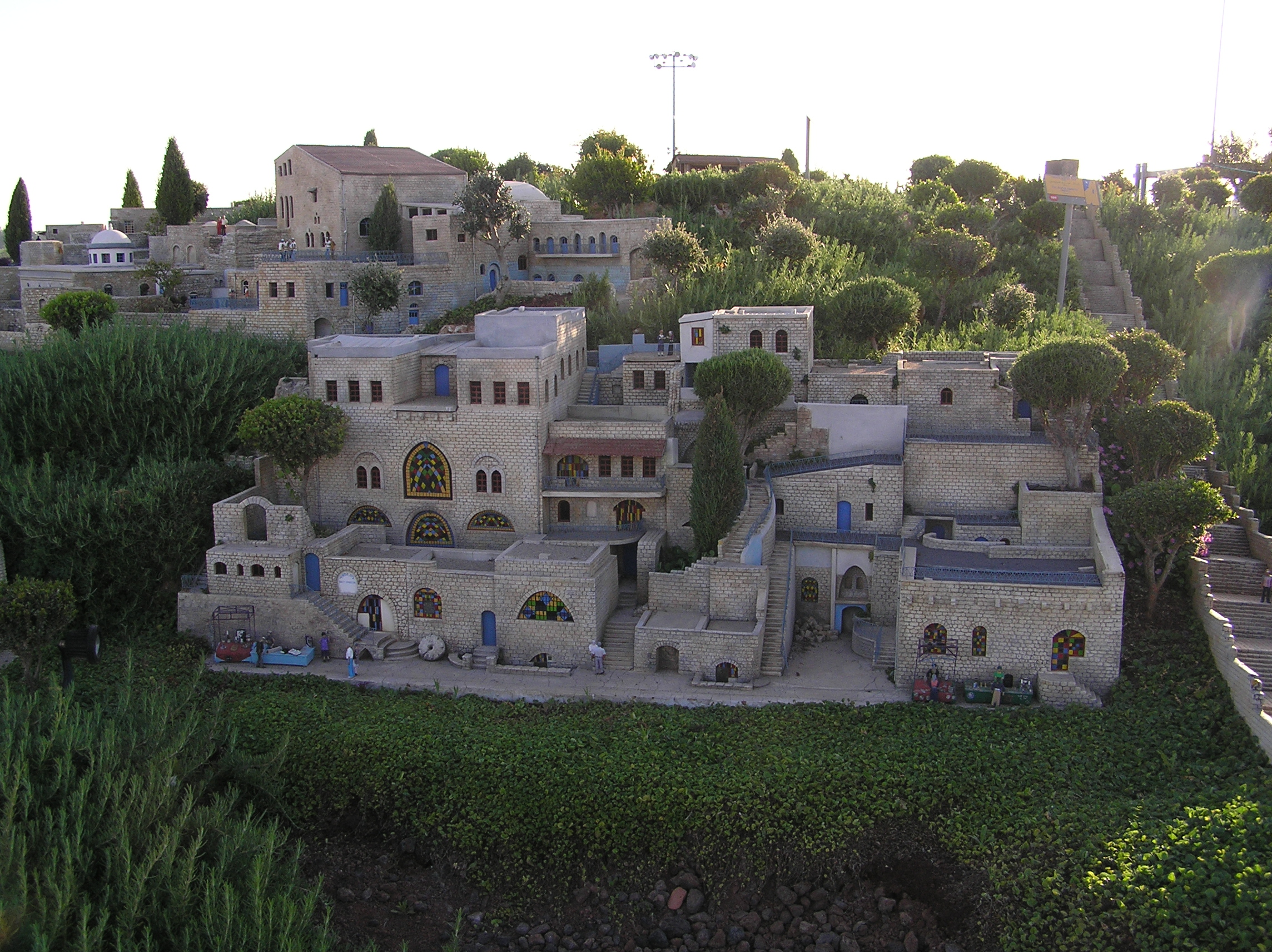
Safed

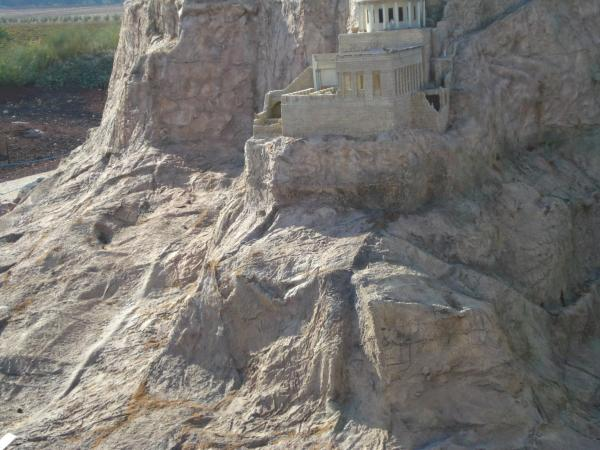
Masada

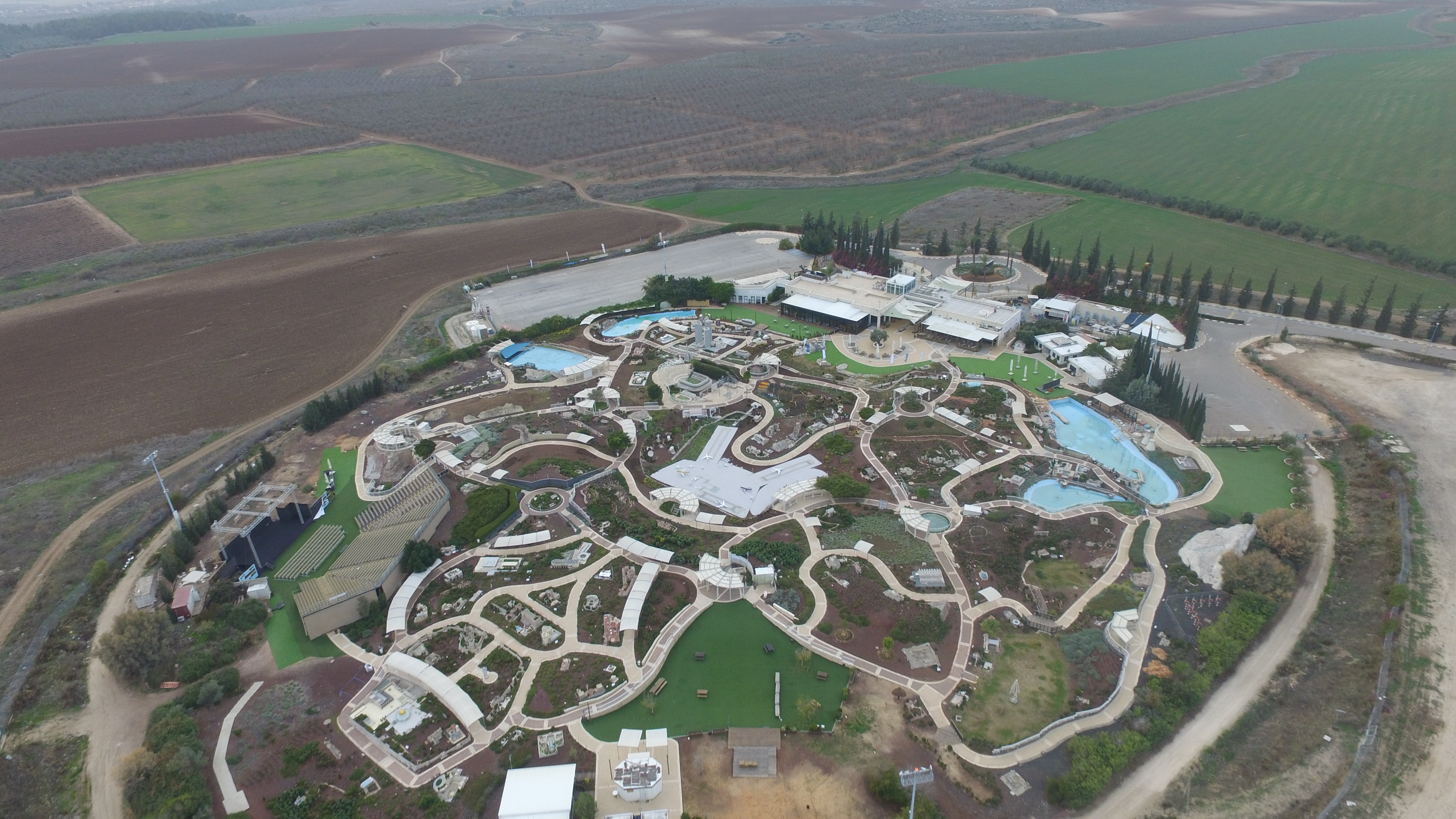
View of the Mini Israel

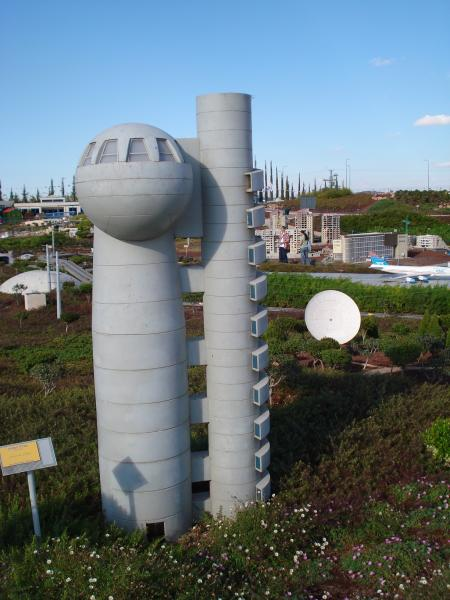
Weizmann Institute of Science

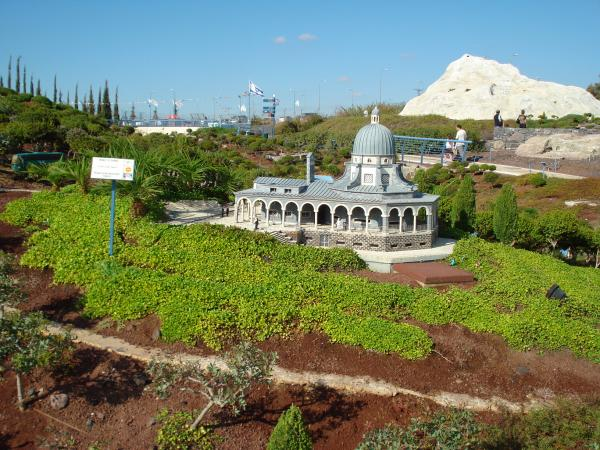
Church of the Beatitudes, Sea of Galilee

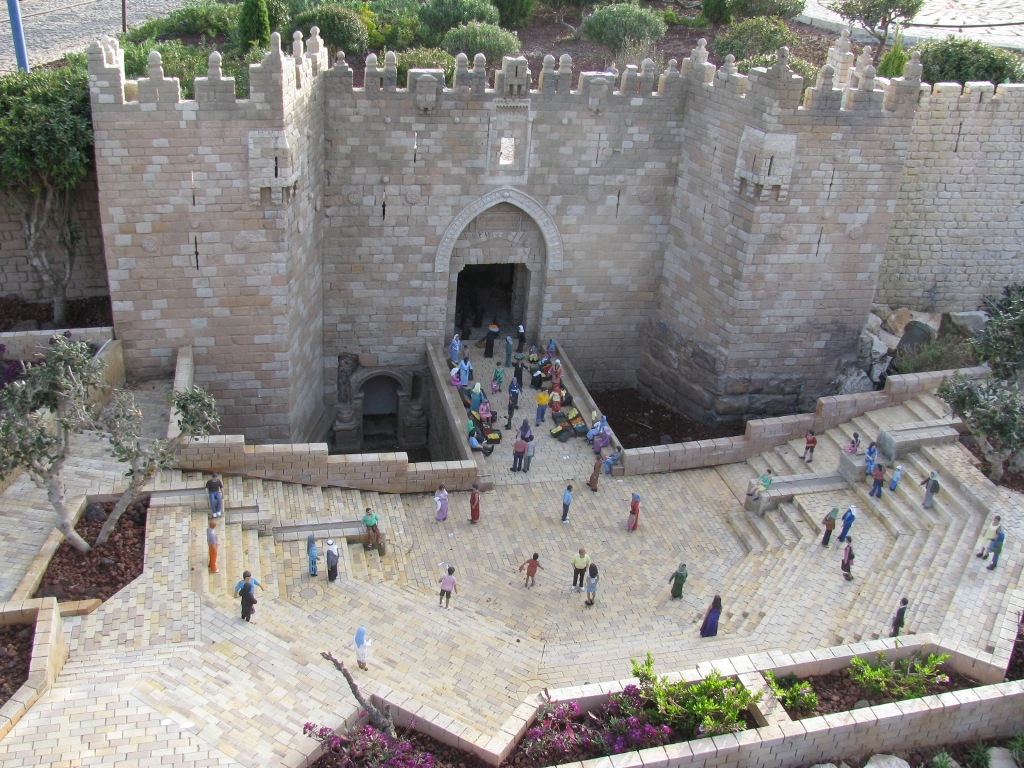
Damascus Gate, Jerusalem

== See also ==
- Kasol, India resort often termed "mini-Israel"
