= Corinne Cléry =

French actress (b. 1950)

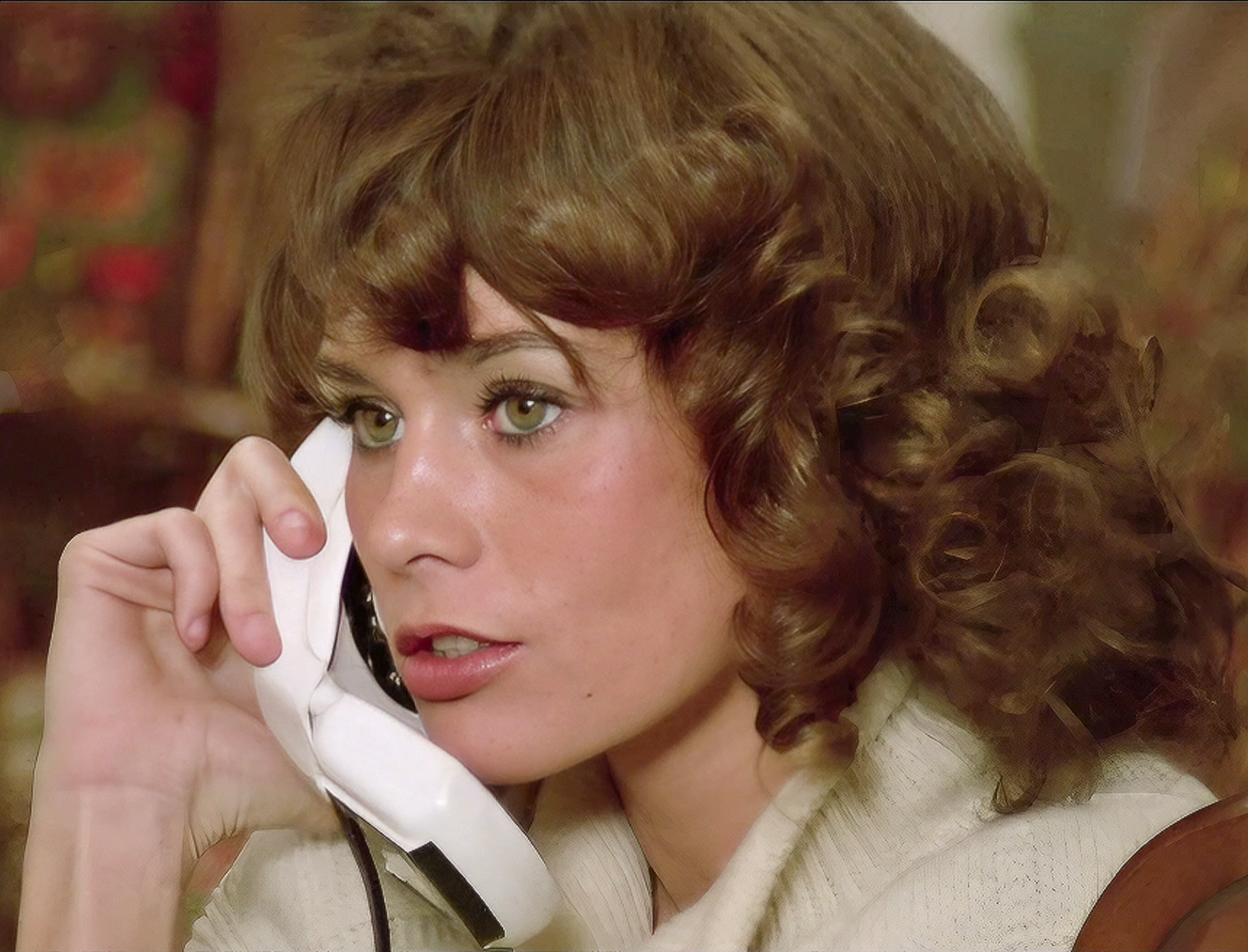
- Cléry in 1973
- Born: Corinne Marie-Madeleine Geneviève Pierrette Picolo; 23 March 1950 (age 76); Paris, France
- Other name: Corinne Piccoli
- Occupation: Actress
- Years active: 1967–present
- Spouse: Hubert Wayaffe (m. 1967, divorced) Luca Valerio (divorced) Giuseppe Ercole (m. 2004; death 2010)

Corinne Marie-Madeleine Geneviève Pierrette Picolo, better known as Corinne Cléry (French: [kɔʁin kleʁi]; born 23 March 1950), is a French actress. Her breakthrough role was as the title character in Story of O (1975), based on the novel of the same name. She subsequently had significant career in Italian cinema, and also played Corinne Dufour in the James Bond film Moonraker (1979).

== Life and career ==
Cléry was born Corinne Marie-Madeleine Geneviève Pierrette Picolo on 23 March 1950 near Paris, and raised in Saint-Germain-en-Laye. She began her acting career in the late 1960s under the name Corinne Piccoli. Her first important film was Joël Le Moigne's Les Poneyttes with Johnny Hallyday and DJ Hubert Wayaffe, whom she married at the end of the filming, aged 17. From 1974 to 1976, she was a spokesperson for René Briand brandy.

Cléry first came to prominence in the movie Story of O (1975) (Histoire d'O). She also modelled for the cover of French magazine Lui in which she is holding a huge copy of the novel upon which the film is based.

Cléry is also known for playing Bond girl Corinne Dufour, antagonist Hugo Drax's assistant, in the 1979 James Bond film Moonraker. She also starred with Bond girl Barbara Bach (who played Anya Amasova in The Spy Who Loved Me) and Richard Kiel (who played Bond villain Jaws) in the film The Humanoid (1979). Following Moonraker, she appeared in several Italian language films. She also starred in the films Covert Action, Hitch Hike with actor David Hess, Sergio Corbucci's The Con Artists with Adriano Celentano and Anthony Quinn, and the science fiction film Yor, the Hunter from the Future.

Cléry became a housemate in the second season of Grande Fratello VIP, the Italian adaptation of Celebrity Big Brother. In 2023, she participated in the 17th season of the reality show L'isola dei famosi, and was eliminated after 7 weeks.

== Personal life ==
Cléry married radio personality Hubert Wayaffe in 1967, when she was 17-years-old. The two had a son, Alexandre. The couple later divorced.

In 2004, Cléry married Italian businessman Giuseppe Ercole, who had previously been married to Serena Grandi. They remained together until Ercole's death in 2010. From 2017 to 2018, she was in a relationship with actor Angelo Costabile.

She considers herself an atheist.

== Filmography ==
Year	Title	Role	Notes
1967	Les Poneyttes	Poneytte aka Corinne	
1975	Story of O	O	
1976	The Con Artists	Charlotte	
1976	Il sergente Rompiglioni	Figlia del colonnello	
1976	Sturmtruppen	La donna	
1976	Natale in casa d'appuntamento	Senine	
1976	Plot of Fear	Jeanne	
1977	Three Tigers Against Three Tigers	The Nanny	
1977	Hitch Hike	Eve Mancini	
1977	Kleinhoff Hotel	Pascale Rota	
1978	Covert Action	Anne Florio	
1979	The Humanoid	Barbara Gibson	
1979	Moonraker	Corinne Dufour	
1979	I viaggiatori della sera	Ortensia	
1980	Eroina (Tunnel)	Pina	
1980	I Hate Blondes	Angelica	
1981	Last Harem	Sara	
1983	Yor, the Hunter from the Future	Ka-Laa	
1984	Summer Games	Lisa Donelli	
1986	Yuppies	Francesca	
1986	The Devil's Honey	Carol Simpson	
1986	Via Montenapoleone	Chiara	
1988	The Gamble	Jacqueline	
1988	Rimini Rimini - Un anno dopo	Carla Formigoni	
1990	Occhio alla perestrojka	Angela Bonetti	
1990	Vacanze di Natale '90	Alessandra	
1991	L'avvoltoio può attendere	Alexandra	
1991	Forever	Julia	
1991	28° minuto	Paola	
1992	Non chiamarmi Omar	Luisa Tavoni	
1994	Donna di cuori	Vania	
1995	Le Roi de Paris	Betty Favart	
1995	A Dio piacendo	Valeria	
2000	Alex l'ariete	Ernestina	
2001	Prigionieri di un incubo		
2002	Il diario di Matilde Manzoni		
2007	Il peso dell'aria	Anna	
2016	Attesa e cambiamenti		
2018	Beyond the Mist	Rosa Carlini	
2019	W gli sposi	Suor Clementina	
2020	Free - Liberi	Erica	
2021	Ritorno al crimine	Countess Roccapadula	
2021	Angela and I	Arturo's mother	
