= Covert Action (film) =

1978 film

- Original movie poster
- Directed by: Romolo Guerrieri
- Written by: Nico Ducci; Romolo Guerrieri; Mino Roli; Vittorio Schiraldi
- Produced by: Mihalis Lefakis
- Starring: David Janssen; Arthur Kennedy; Corinne Cléry
- Cinematography: Erico Menczer
- Edited by: Antonio Siciliano
- Music by: Stelvio Cipriani
- Release date: 1978
- Running time: 100 minutes
- Countries: Italy; Greece

Covert Action (Italian: Sono Stato un Agente C.I.A.) is a 1978 Italian/Greek co-production Eurospy film starring the American actor David Janssen.

The plot was based on the experiences of former CIA agent Philip Agee who initiated a lawsuit with the producers over his fees and expenses.

== Plot ==
A former CIA agent decides to write about his career in the CIA; this leads him into danger.

== Production ==
The original female lead Catherine Bach dropped out and was replaced with Corinne Cléry. Due to a then-new Italian ordinance that prohibited the firing of firearms in Italian movies, gunfire scenes were filmed in Greece.

== Cast ==
- David Janssen ... Lester Horton
- Arthur Kennedy ... CIA Chief Maxwell of Station, Athens
- Maurizio Merli ... Joe Florio
- Corinne Cléry ... Anne Florio
- Philippe Leroy ... Greek Inspector
- Ivan Rassimov ... The Silent
- Giacomo Rossi-Stuart ... Grant
