= The Con Artists (1976 film) =

1976 film directed by Sergio Corbucci

Bluff: storie di truffe e di imbroglioni (The Con Artists)
- Directed by: Sergio Corbucci
- Written by: Sergio Corbucci; Dino Maiuri; Massimo De Rita
- Produced by: Mario Cecchi Gori
- Starring: Adriano Celentano; Anthony Quinn; Corinne Clery; Capucine
- Cinematography: Marcello Gatti
- Edited by: Eugenio Alabisio
- Music by: Lelio Luttazzi
- Distributed by: Cecchi Gori Group
- Release date: 1976
- Running time: 110 minutes
- Country: Italy

Bluff - storia di truffe e di imbroglioni (internationally released as The Con Artists, Bluff, High Rollers, The Switch, and The Con Man) is a 1976 Italian crime-comedy film directed by Sergio Corbucci. For his performance in this film Adriano Celentano was awarded with a David di Donatello for Best Actor.

== Plot ==
In southern France during the Roaring Twenties, Philip Bang, a notorious master con man serving his time in prison, is relocated to a high security facility for hard labor after causing an uproar at supper. This, however, is actually part of a plan to spring him from prison, arranged with the aid of his former wife and partner, Belle Duke (proprietor of a casino yacht and herself a con woman), and his daughter, Charlotte. But on his way to a transit facility, as Bang prepares to vacate the train via a wagon restroom, he suddenly finds himself the unwilling escape aide of another con man, young Italian "Felix", who leaves Bang in the soup.

Before Felix can enjoy his new-found freedom, he is picked up by Belle Duke's men, who mistake him for Bang. Once his true identity is found out, Belle Duke is less than delighted and demands of Felix to free Bang. When Felix manages to escape her thugs, Belle Duke uses Charlotte to set him up, leaving him no alternative than to agree to her request. Using his own experiences with the transit facility, a purloined priest's cassock and a cuckoo clock bomb, Felix breaks Bang out, but Bang proves reluctant to return to Belle Duke, since he had fleeced her of her wealth before going to prison, and for that reason Belle is likely wanting to see the return of her money and revenge exacted on him.

After testing Felix's talents and attitude, they become partners, joined by Charlotte, who has fallen in love with Felix. In order to fool Belle Duke once again, Bang decides to use the money he and Felix have appropriated to buy a worthless piece of swampland, arranging a fake archeological sensation (using real museum exhibits and Bang's old gang) and an alleged black market scheme to convince Belle Duke to purchase it at an astronomical price. The plan works out splendidly, but Felix decides to raise the stakes of the game by claiming that he has kidnapped Charlotte, using Bang's sincere distress to fully convince Belle Duke of the "veracity" of their con scheme.

Felix makes a run from Belle's men with the money, but supposedly dies when his escape boat crashes into a boathouse and explodes. Shortly afterwards, the police, called upon the scene by Felix as part of his plan, arrives, supposedly arresting a dismayed Bang. But once again a double bluff is played as the police squad turns out to be Bang's con gang, and an unexpected motorcycle escort to be Felix in command of a few shop-window mannequins. After convincing Bang with some effort that his kidnapping sham was actually meant to throw off their opposition, Felix, Bang and Charlotte narrowly escape Belle Duke, who has since discovered the deception, via single-engine airplane. And as a final point, Felix cannot resist one last bluff when he accidentally spills the fleeced 100 million Francs out of the plane's open door, only to reel them back in, with each bill meticulously tied to a long line.

== Cast ==
- Adriano Celentano as Felice Brianza aka "Felix"
- Anthony Quinn as Philip Bang
- Corinne Cléry as Charlotte
- Capucine as Belle Duke
- Attilio Dottesio as professor (credited as Attilio D'ottesio)
- Renzo Marignano as tailor
- Ugo Bologna as the prison director
- Sal Borgese as Belle Duke Henchman
- Mircha Carven as Belle Duke Henchman
- Leo Gavero as Jeweller
- Mickey Knox as Philip Accomplice
- Fortunato Arena as Philip Accomplice
- Helen Stirling as Hotel Landlady
- Renzo Ozzano as Betrayed Man at Casino
- Saviana Scalfi as Betrayed Man's Wife
- Erigo Palombini as Belle Duke Henchman (credited as Enrico Palombini)
- Giuseppe Tuminelli as Auctioneer (credited as Pippo Tuminelli)
- Virgilio Ponti as Police Inspector
- Rocco Lerro Belle as Duke Driver (credited as Lerro Rocco)

== See also ==
- List of Italian films of 1976
