= The Humanoid (film) =

1979 Italian science fiction film by Aldo Lado

- US theatrical release poster
- Italian: L'umanoide
- Directed by: Aldo Lado
- Screenplay by: Adriano Bolzoni; Aldo Lado
- Story by: Adriano Bolzoni
- Produced by: Giorgio Venturini
- Starring: Richard Kiel; Corinne Cléry; Leonard Mann; Barbara Bach; Arthur Kennedy; Ivan Rassimov; Marco Yeh; Massimo Serato
- Cinematography: Silvano Ippoliti
- Edited by: Mario Morra
- Music by: Ennio Morricone
- Production company: Merope Film
- Distributed by: Titanus (Italy)
- Release date: 11 April 1979 (Italy)
- Running time: 100 minutes
- Country: Italy
- Language: Italian

The Humanoid (Italian: L'umanoide) is a 1979 Italian space opera film directed by Aldo Lado, and starring Richard Kiel, Corinne Cléry, Leonard Mann, Ivan Rassimov and Arthur Kennedy.

The film is generally considered to have been a cash-in on the success of the original Star Wars, down to having director Aldo Lado be credited as 'George B. Lewis'.

== Plot ==
Sometime in the distant future, the planet Metropolis (once known as Earth) is a peaceful utopia led by a leader called The Great Brother. His world is threatened by his brother Graal who has escaped from a prison satellite, stolen a warship and enlisted the help of a mad scientist named Dr. Kraspin. Kraspin has a plan to make an army of unstoppable supersoldiers he calls "Humanoids," but to mutate them he requires the powerful element Kapitron that is being kept at the Grovan Institute on Metropolis.

Graal sends down a squad of soldiers to break into the institute and steal the Kapitron. They are also ordered to kill a woman named Barbara Gibson, a scientist who once worked with Kraspin but who realized the horrendous potential of the element and had Kraspin committed to a mental facility. Kraspin had escaped the facility two years earlier and seeks revenge against her. Barbara leaves before the slaughter when she is summoned home by her mysterious pupil, a boy named Tom Tom who exhibits powers of mental suggestion. Tom Tom also communes periodically with two mysterious beings who he claims are foreign travelers.

After the raid, Graal returns to his hidden base on the planet Noxon where he is joined by Lady Agatha, the world's tyrannical queen, who hopes to share the rule of the galaxy as Graal's wife once he conquers Metropolis. Kraspin is also hiding there, given asylum in exchange for keeping Agatha young and beautiful with daily injections of a youth serum he creates by sapping the life essence of female slaves.

Once in possession of the Kapitron, Kraspin selects the perfect specimen to test his mutation on and targets a bearded, giant of a man named Golob. Kraspin forces Golob to crash his ship in a lake and Kraspin fires a small Kapitron missile which explodes turning Golob into a beardless, raging hulk with superhuman strength. Witnessing the horror is Golob's robot dog companion Kip, who sadly watches Kraspin capture and take his master away.

Kraspin fits Golob with a brain control chip and unleashes him upon Metropolis with orders to kill the Great Brother. Nick, a Metropolis security officer, tries to protect the Great Brother, but Golob is unstoppable. As Golob approaches his primary target to destroy him, Kraspin interrupts with new orders to go after Barbara Gibson first and Golob leaves.

Golob tracks Barbara to her house but Tom Tom uses his powers to calm him down and removes the control chip. Golob, now free of Kraspin's control, becomes Tom Tom and Barbara's friend. Golob tells Barbara that Graal and Kraspin are hiding on Noxon and she goes to inform Nick and The Great Brother. On her way, however, Barbara is captured by Graal's forces and taken back to his base. Tom Tom and Golob try to rescue her but are forced to retreat when Graal's soldiers open fire. The two are saved by the mysterious travelers who shoot the soldiers with glowing arrows.

At the Metropolis command center, Nick devises a plan to rescue Barbara with a commando raid, but the Great Brother fears innocent people living on Noxon will be killed. Instead, Golob says he will rescue Barbara himself. Nick joins him and he and Golob take a ship to Noxon. Along the way they discover Tom Tom stowing away and wanting to help. Nearing the planet, their ship is attacked by Graal's fighters and crash lands. Near the crash site, they encounter Kip who Golob excitedly remembers as his old companion. Kip then helps them sneak into Graal's base. Once inside the heroes discover Kraspin has a giant missile filled with Kapitron that he will explode over Metropolis and turn its population into mutant humanoids.

Meanwhile, Barbara is taken to Kraspin's laboratory and placed in a machine to extract her essence. Barbara is saved last minute when Nick and Golob burst in and free her from the machine. Kraspin and Agatha then attempt to flee to Graal's ship.

With Barbara's help and assistance from the mysterious travelers, the heroes launch an attack on the missile launch bay. Kraspin is killed when Golob topples the launch pad of the Kapitron rocket. During the battle, Agatha, unable to get a dose of the youth serum, dies when she rapidly ages into a skeleton. Nick chases Graal onto the bridge of his ship and faces off with him in a duel. Graal shoots lasers from his hands in defense and almost kills Nick. Golob appears and crushes a control panel on his chest but Graal disappears.

Golob then removes the Kapitron container from the missile which then launches across the bay and hits Graal's ship destroying it. With the facility exploding around them, the heroes make their escape but without Golob. Tom Tom spots him running away with the Kapitron and jumping off a cliff into a lake. The lake explodes and the heroes fear Golob dead, but he emerges from the water with the effects of the mutation having been reversed. The group briefly celebrates their reunion and victory over their enemy.

A mysterious translucent sailing ship appears in the sky piloted by the two travelers. Tom Tom tells Barbara that his mission is over and he must return home. Barbara asks who he really is and where he comes from. Tom Tom tells her he is returning to a land called Tibet in the ancient past, but he will always be with her in her heart. Tom Tom is then seen departing on the ship as the movie ends.

== Cast ==
- Richard Kiel as Golob
- Corinne Cléry as Barbara Gibson
- Leonard Mann as Nick
- Barbara Bach as Lady Agatha
- Arthur Kennedy as Dr. Kraspin
- Ivan Rassimov as Lord Graal
- Marco Yeh as Tom Tom
- Massimo Serato as Great Brother
- Venantino Venantini
- José Quaglio

== Production ==
Filming took place on-location in Eilat, Israel, and at Cinecittà Studios in Rome. Antonio Margheriti was the film's visual effects supervisor, and Enzo G. Castellari was the second unit director.

== Similarities with Star Wars ==
There are numerous influences from Star Wars: A New Hope. A similar opening text crawl detailing current events in the film, the main villain wears a costume similar to that of Darth Vader and he commands a triangle-shaped spaceship resembling a Star Destroyer. Many of the sets, costumes and vehicles also appear similar in design and the director, Aldo Lado, goes by the alias "George B. Lewis" in reference to George Lucas.

== See also ==
- Starcrash (1978) - Another Italian film inspired by Star Wars.
- List of Italian films of 1979
