= The Rogues (film) =

1987 film

- Italian theatrical release poster by Enzo Sciotti
- Directed by: Mario Monicelli
- Written by: Leo Benvenuti; Suso Cecchi d'Amico; Piero De Bernardi; Mario Monicelli
- Produced by: Giovanni Di Clemente
- Starring: Giancarlo Giannini; Enrico Montesano; Vittorio Gassman; Nino Manfredi; Giuliana De Sio; Bernard Blier
- Cinematography: Tonino Nardi
- Edited by: Ruggero Mastroianni
- Music by: Lucio Dalla; Mauro Malavasi
- Distributed by: Warner Bros. Italia (Italy); Warner Española S.A. (Spain)
- Release date: 1987
- Running time: 120 minutes
- Countries: Italy; Spain
- Language: Italian

I picari, internationally released as The Rogues, is a 1987 Italian comedy film written and directed by Mario Monicelli. It is freely inspired by the Spanish novels Lazarillo de Tormes and Guzman de Alfarache.

The film was co-produced with Spain, where it was released as Los alegres pícaros.

== Plot ==
I picari was the last of Monicelli's films (another example is For Love and Gold) to be set in the Renaissance and medieval eras. As in his previous films, a tilting of the society and surroundings of the characters makes the film a parody of the goliardic lifestyle of the 12th or 13th century.

In 17th-century Spain, vagrants Lazarillo and Guzman meet as slaves on a ship. Both had a troubled and difficult childhood because of their parents. The first was adopted by a prostitute and a blind wanderer (Nino Manfredi) who earned a living by cheating and stealing. The second was beaten and scourged. Escaping from the ship in which they were held captive, Lazarillo and Guzman stop at a strange place where they cheat a blacksmith. Later, disguised as gentleman, they are hosted by an impoverished nobleman (Vittorio Gassman). The two tramps, who hoped to make a fortune by entering the service of a nobleman, are shocked by his poor quarters and dire living conditions. Lazarillo and Guzman then become part of a theater company, scrape together some money, buy a prostitute, and encounter a gang of criminals. One of them kills a king's guard and is sentenced to death. His friend saves him by replacing him with another prisoner.

== Cast ==
- Giancarlo Giannini as Guzman de Alfarache
- Enrico Montesano as Lazarillo de Tormes
- Vittorio Gassman as Marquis Felipe de Aragona
- Nino Manfredi as the blind wanderer
- Giuliana De Sio as Rosario
- Bernard Blier as the pimp
- Paolo Hendel as the tutor
- Vittorio Caprioli as Mozzafiato
- Enzo Robutti as the Captain of the ship
- Blanca Marsillach as Ponzia
- Maria Casanova as the pregnant woman
- Claudio Bisio as the leader of the mutinied rowers
- Sal Borgese as the boatswain
- Sabrina Ferilli as the young prostitute

== Production ==
The film was first announced on February 1986. Marcello Mastroianni and Ornella Muti were initially rumored to be part of the cast. Principal cinematography started on April 1987. It was filmed between Sicily and Spain. It had a budget of about 7 billion lire.

== See also ==
- El Lazarillo de Tormes (1959)
