= Dan Hotel, Tel Aviv =

Hotel in Tel Aviv, Israel, opened 1953

Coordinates: 32°04′47″N 34°46′04″E

Dan Tel Aviv Hotel מלון דן תל אביב
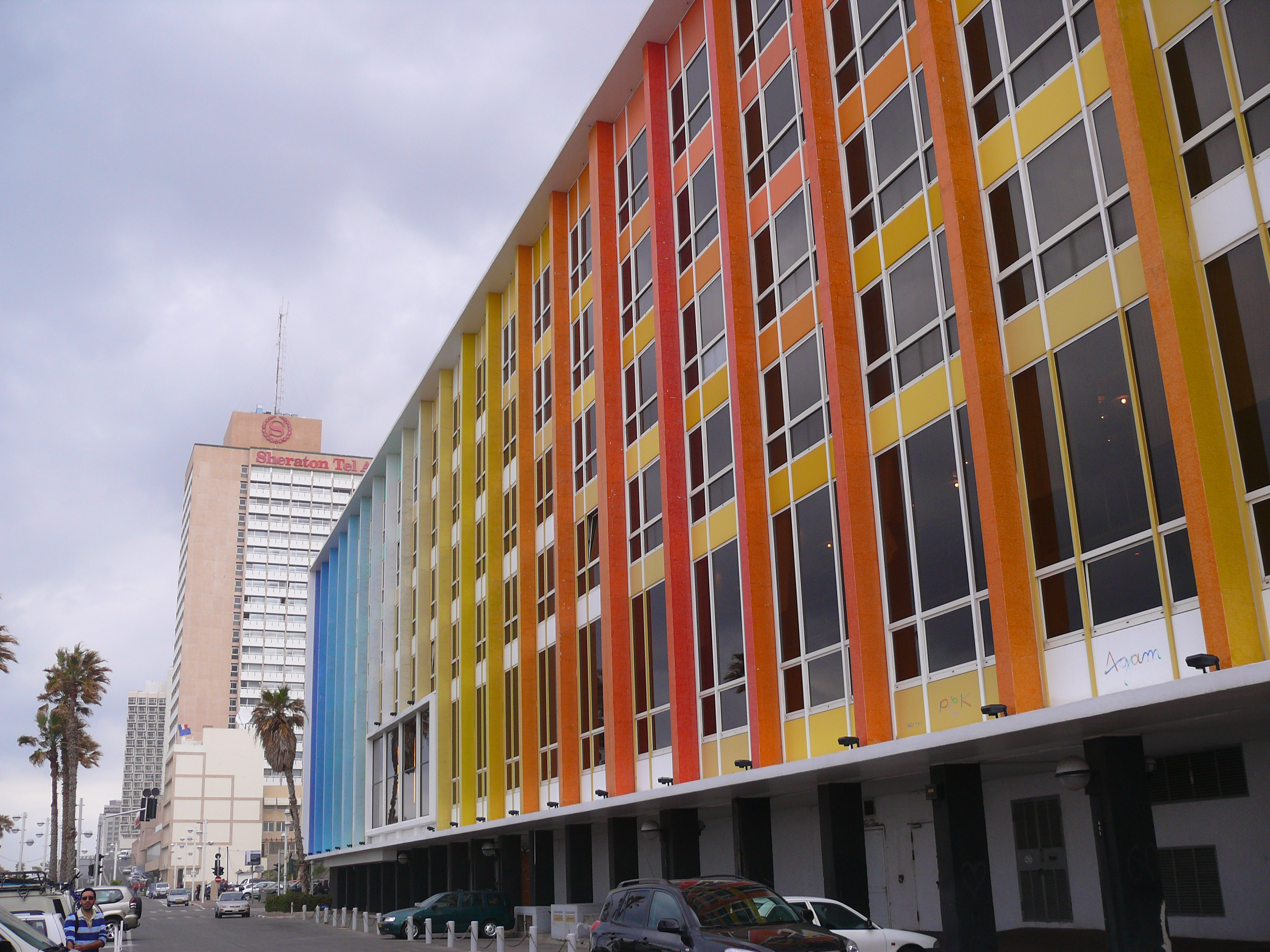
- Interactive map of the Dan Tel Aviv Hotel מלון דן תל אביב area

General information
- Location: Tel Aviv, Israel
- Opening: 1953
- Owner: Dan Hotels
- Management: Dan Hotels

Design and construction
- Architect: Yaacov Agam

Other information
- Number of rooms: 286
- Number of restaurants: 3

Website
- www.danhotels.com/TelAvivHotels/DanTelAvivHotel/

The Dan Tel Aviv Hotel is a 5-star hotel in Tel Aviv. According to Time, it is the "closest Tel Aviv has to a hotel grand dame". It was the first in the Dan Hotels chain.

It is located on Tel Aviv's seafront, within walking distance of many attractions, including Tel Aviv Port and the Old City of Jaffa. Notable guests have included Bill and Hillary Clinton, Paul McCartney, Michael Jackson, Madonna, The Rolling Stones, U2, and Lady Gaga.

== History ==
The original building was built in the 1930s, and started as a small pension called Kaete Dan. It was the first lodging of any kind on the beach in Tel Aviv. For a time it served as the headquarters of Haganah. In June 1947, Yekutiel and Shmuel Federmann bought the building, and adopting the name from the previous owner, they formed the Dan Hotels Corporation. The new owners demolished the original building, and the new hotel was completed in 1953.

In 1986 a new facade was added, in the colours of the rainbow, designed by Yaacov Agam. In 1994 the King David Tower (height 82 meters) was built, adjoining the south of the hotel. In 2000 the hotel underwent a complete renovation. In July 2019, Rama Oram was appointed as general manager of the hotel, becoming the first woman to hold this position.

== Amenities ==
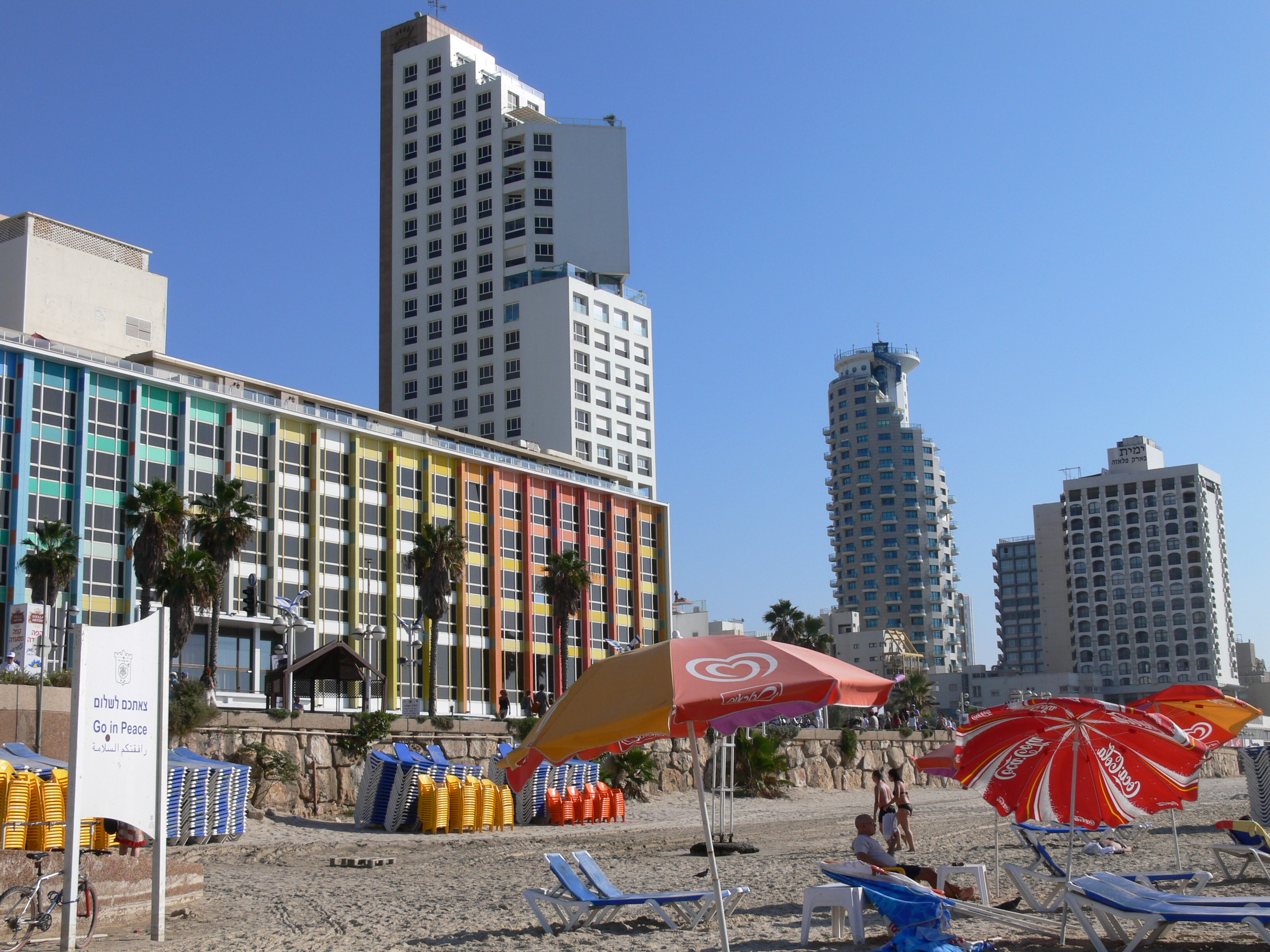
Dan Hotel beachfront

Dan Tel Aviv Hotel’s facilities include the kosher Restaurant Hayarkon 99 (chef Oved Alfia), the kosher dairy restaurant D-restaurant, Yam breakfast and the Dan Hotel Bar. It has a sports and spa facility with indoor and outdoor seawater swimming pools available to hotel guests.

== Notable guests ==
Al Gore, Alanis Morissette, Alicia Keys, Anders Fogh Rasmussen, Ashton Kutcher, Barbra Streisand, Ban Ki-moon, Bill Clinton, Black Eyed Peas, Bob Dylan, Bob Simon, Børge Brende, Borut Pahor, Catherine Ashton, Chulabhorn, David Lynch, Deepak Kapoor, Denzel Washington, Franco Frattini, Gene Simmons, Guido Westerwelle, Hillary Clinton, Jacques Rogge, Jesse Eisenberg, Johan Cruyff, Jon Landau, John McCain, José Carreras, Kelis, Lady Gaga, Lauryn Hill, Madonna, Manny Mori, Marianne Faithfull, Martin Lidegaard, Michael Jackson, Natalie Portman, Pamela Anderson, Paul McCartney, Paul Simon, Perez Hilton, Quentin Tarantino, Red Hot Chili Peppers, Ricardo Martinelli, Rickie Lee Jones, Richard Gere, Robert Gates, Roger Moore, Sharon Stone, The Rolling Stones, Thomas de Maizière, Tony Blair, U2 and Verne Troyer.

== See also ==
- Yaacov Agam
- Art in Tel Aviv
- Tourism in Israel
