= Estoy en crisis =

1982 comedy film

- Directed by: Fernando Colomo
- Screenplay by: Fernando Colomo; Andreu Martín
- Starring: José Sacristán; Cristina Marsillach; Mercedes Sampietro
- Cinematography: Ángel Luis Fernández Herrero
- Edited by: Miguel Ángel Santamaría
- Music by: José Nieto
- Release date: 1982
- Language: Spanish

Estoy en crisis (lit. 'I'm having a crisis') is a 1982 Spanish comedy film co-written and directed by Fernando Colomo.

The film was entered into the main competition at the 39th edition of the Venice Film Festival.

== Cast ==
- José Sacristán as Bernabé
- Cristina Marsillach as Lucía
- Mercedes Sampietro as Gloria
- Fernando Vivanco as Benavides
- Enrique San Francisco as Enrique
- Marta Fernández Muro as Evelia
- Luis Ciges as Hortelano
