= King David Hotel =

Hotel in Jerusalem, Israel

King David Hotel מלון המלך דוד
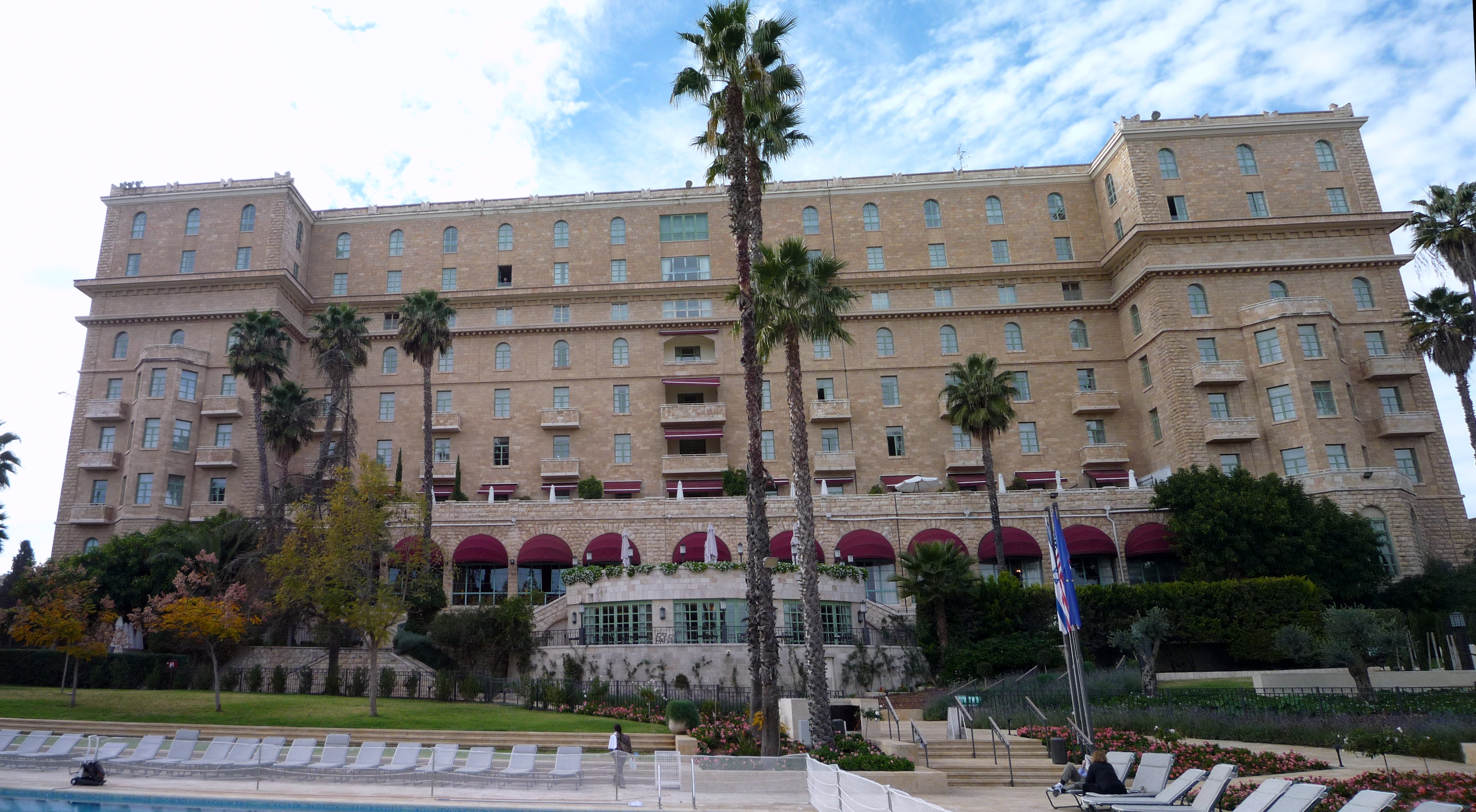
- King David Hotel

- Location within Jerusalem

General information
- Location: Jerusalem
- Coordinates: 31°46′28″N 35°13′21″E
- Opening: 1931
- Owner: Dan Hotels
- Operator: Dan Hotels

Design and construction
- Developer: Frank Goldsmith

Other information
- Number of rooms: 237
- Number of restaurants: 4

Website
- King David Jerusalem Hotel

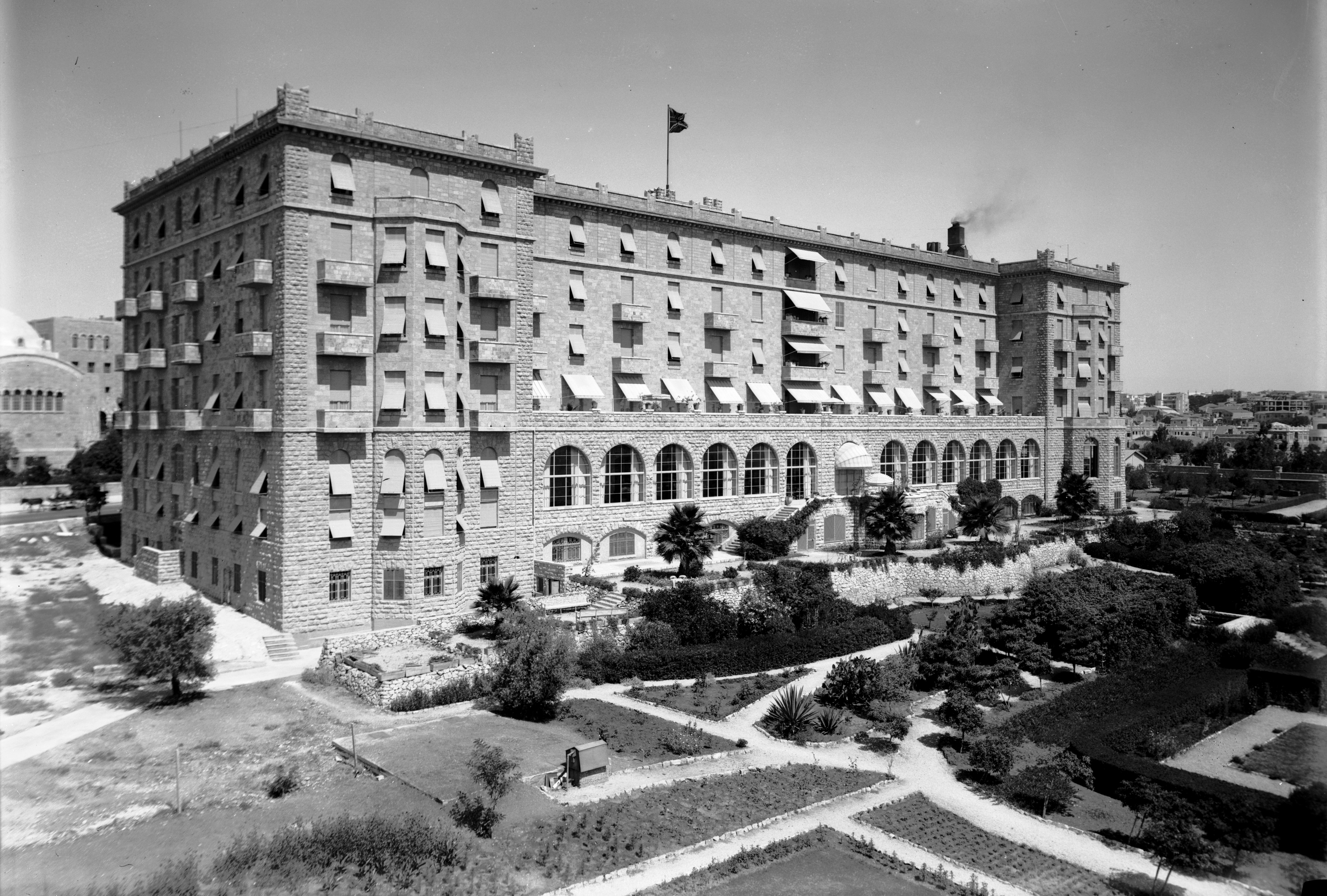
The hotel in 1931

The King David Hotel (Hebrew: מלון המלך דוד, romanized: Malon ha-Melekh David; Arabic: فندق الملك داود, romanized: Funduq al-Malik Dāwūd) is a 5-star hotel in Jerusalem and a member of The Leading Hotels of the World. Opened in 1931, it was built with locally quarried pink limestone and was founded by Ezra Mosseri, a wealthy Egyptian Jewish banker. It is located on King David Street in the centre of Jerusalem, overlooking the Old City and Mount Zion, and is named after the Biblical King David.

The hotel, owned and operated by the Dan Hotels group, has traditionally been the chosen venue for hosting heads of state, dignitaries, politicians and celebrities during their visits to Jerusalem.

On 22 July 1946, an attack by the Zionist organization Irgun targeted the hotel's southern wing, which contained offices for the British authorities during Mandatory Palestine, killing 91 people of various nationalities and injuring 45.

== History ==
=== Mandatory Palestine ===
In 1929, Palestine Hotels Ltd. purchased 4.5 acres (18,000 m^{2}) on Jerusalem's Julian's Way, today King David Street. Half the construction costs were paid by Ezra Mosseri, an affluent Egyptian Jewish banker and director of the National Bank of Egypt, and another 46% by the Goldschmidt family and other wealthy Cairo Jews. The approximately 4% remaining was paid by the National Bank of Egypt, which purchased 693 shares of the company between 1934 and 1943.

From its earliest days, the King David Hotel hosted royalty: the dowager empress of Pahlavi dynasty, Tadj ol-Molouk, queen consort Nazli of Egypt, and King Abdullah I of Jordan stayed at the hotel, and three heads of state forced to flee their countries took up residence there: King Alfonso XIII of Spain, forced to abdicate in 1931, Emperor Haile Selassie of Ethiopia, driven out by the Italians in 1936, and King George II of Greece, who set up his government in exile at the hotel after the Nazi occupation of his country in 1942. During the Mandatory Palestine, the southern wing of the hotel contained British administrative and military offices.

==== Bombing ====
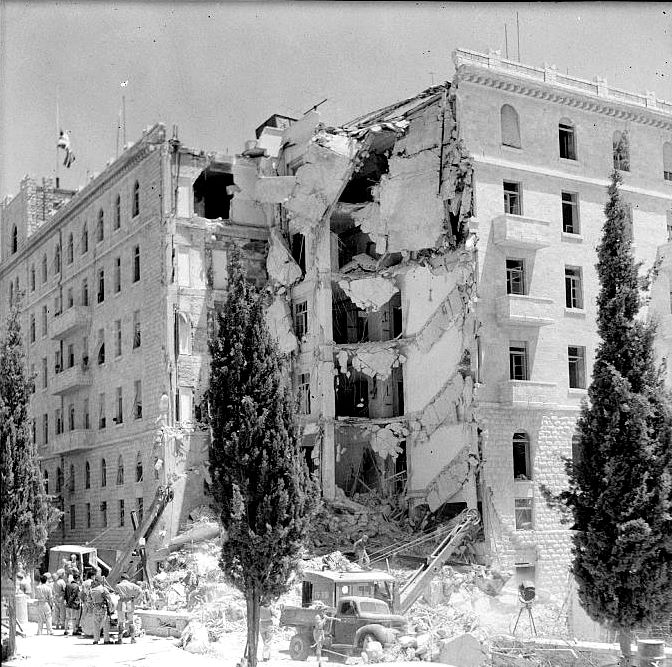
King David Hotel after being targeted in the terrorist attack by the Zionist organization Irgun, 1946

On July 22, 1946, the southwestern corner of the hotel was bombed during an attack by the Zionist paramilitary group Irgun. 91 people of various nationalities, including Britons, Arabs and Jews, were killed and 45 people were injured by the militant right-wing group. An earlier attempt by the Irgun to attack the hotel had been foiled when the Haganah learned of it, and warned the Mandatory Palestine's British authorities.

=== Israel ===
On May 4, 1948, when the British flag was lowered as the British Mandate ended, the building became a Jewish stronghold. At the end of the 1948 Arab–Israeli War, the hotel found itself overlooking "no-man’s land" on the armistice line that divided Jerusalem into Israeli and Jordanian territory. The hotel was purchased by the Dan Hotels chain in 1958. Multiple scenes in the 1960 film Exodus were shot at the hotel, both outside and inside, in the main lobby and on the terrace. When East Jerusalem was annexed by Israel following the 1967 Six-Day War, two additional floors were added.

Among the hotel's famous official guests: British monarch Charles III; King Hussein of Jordan; U.S. Presidents Richard Nixon, Gerald Ford, Jimmy Carter, Bill Clinton, George W. Bush, Barack Obama, Donald Trump and Joe Biden; British Prime Ministers Winston Churchill, Harold Wilson, Margaret Thatcher, John Major, and Tony Blair; Indian Prime Minister Narendra Modi; U.S. politicians Henry Kissinger and Hillary Clinton; as well as many stars including Elizabeth Taylor, Richard Dreyfuss, Richard Gere and Madonna.

== Architecture ==
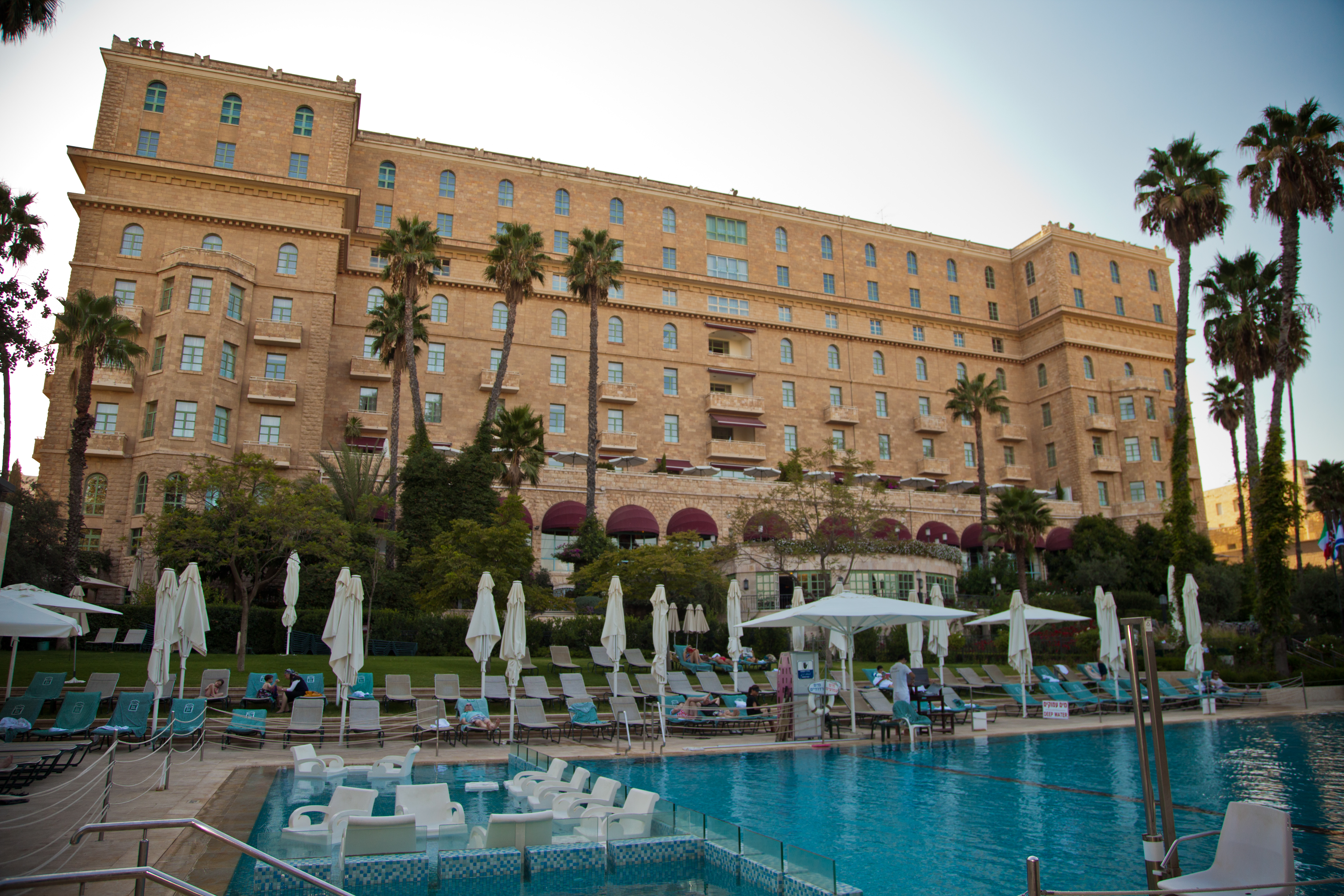
King David Hotel and pool (2012)

The design for the hotel was commissioned from a Swiss architect, Emil Vogt, with the actual construction supervised by Jerusalem architect Benjamin Chaikin. According to Hebrew University professor Ruth Kark, Vogt's approach was typical of European architects who, commissioned to design buildings in Jerusalem, incorporated "Eastern-style domes, arches, various kinds of different-colored stone, and interior decorations with religious symbols and inscriptions," in buildings whose strict symmetry marks them indelibly as European. The public rooms were decorated by Gustave-Adolphe Hufschmid in motifs taken from Assyrian, Hittite, Phoenician and Muslim buildings in an effort to evoke a "Biblical" style. Hufschmid, also Swiss, stated that his intention was "to evoke by reminiscence the ancient Semitic style and the ambiance of the glorious period of King David."

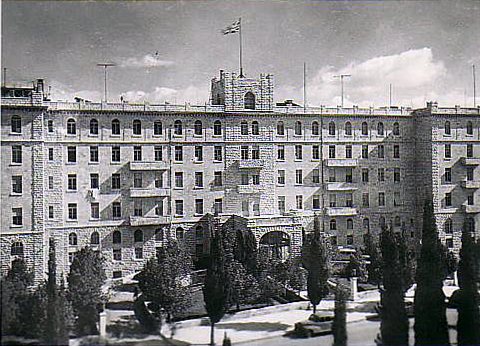
Royal Signals HQ, in June 1946

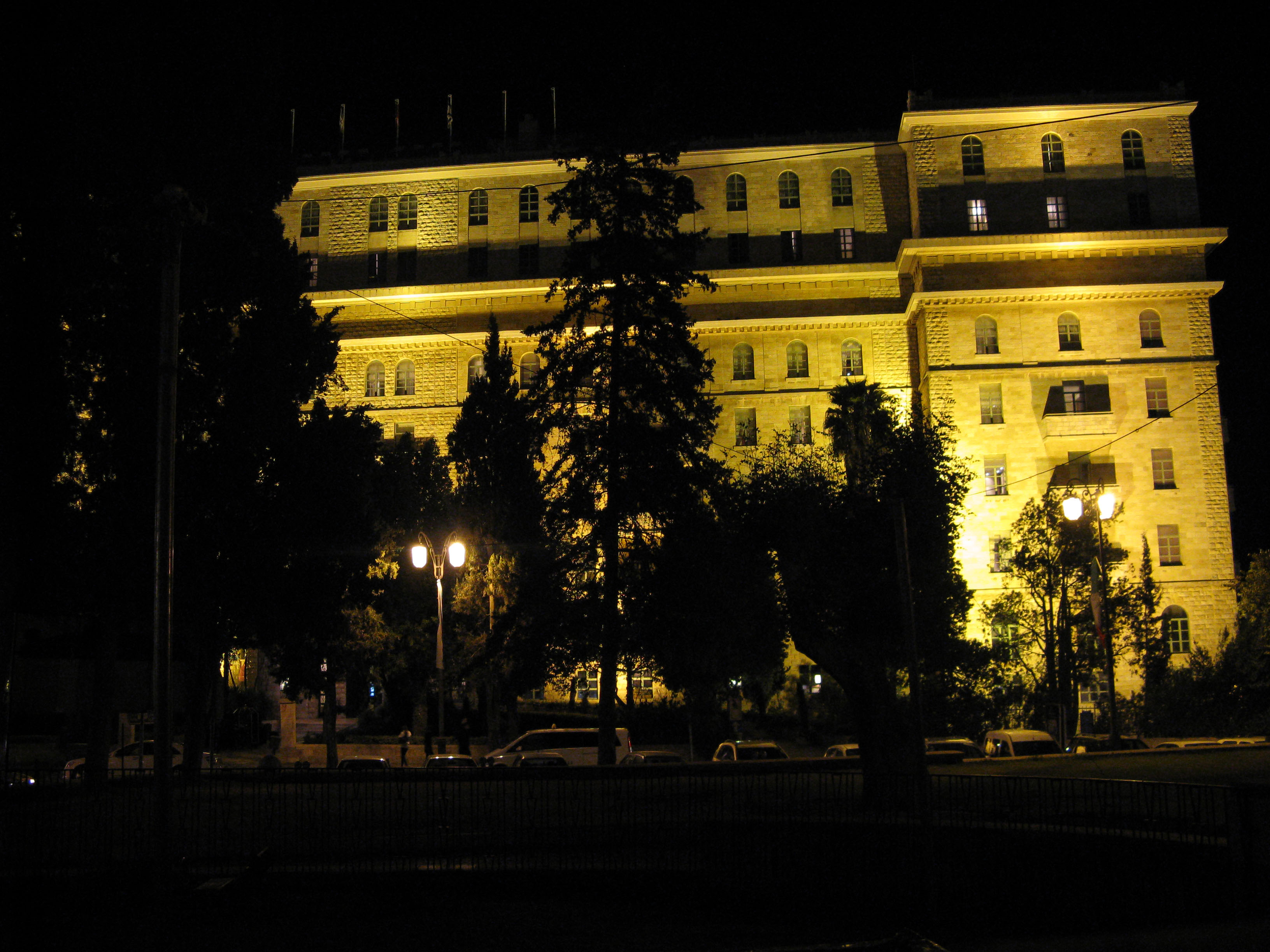
King David Hotel at night (2008)

== Dining ==
In the early days of the hotel, there were few Jews or Arabs on the staff. The chefs were Italian, the service staff were mostly Berbers, the management was Swiss, and the menu served primarily European influenced dishes. In 1958, after ownership of the hotel changed hands, the kitchen began to comply with kashrut regulations, but continued to serve a kosher version of French influenced haute cuisine. Dishes served by the hotel's restaurant during that era included entrecote steak with béarnaise sauce, pommes mignonettes dorées and salmon poached in court-bouillon. By the 1960s, demographics had changed with senior staff positions held mostly by Jews of German or Czech origin, and the restaurant had also started serving traditional dishes from Ashkenazi cuisine for shabbos dinners, such as gehakte leber and gefilte fish. By the 1980s dinner menus included kugel, kreplach in consomme broth, and strudel. Breakfasts consisted of Danish pastry, fruit, cheese, and smoked fish; the latter has become part of a typical Israeli breakfast.

The hotel includes four dining options:

- La Régence – fine dining
- King's Garden
- The Oriental Bar
- Poolside Snack Bar

La Régence and King's Garden are run by executive chef David Biton.
