= Cristina Marsillach =

Spanish actress

- Born: 30 September 1963 (age 63); Madrid, Spain
- Years active: 1976–present
- Parents: Adolfo Marsillach (father); Teresa del Río (mother)
- Relatives: Blanca Marsillach (sister)

Cristina Marsillach (born 30 September 1963) is a Spanish actress.

== Biography ==
She was born in Madrid in a family of actors, the daughter of the actor Adolfo Marsillach and the actress and model María Teresa del Río Martínez del Cerro, who was also Miss Spain, 1960. Her sister Blanca is also an actress.

Cristina Marsillach debuted at age thirteen in the television series, Mrs. Garcia Confesses, thanks to her father who was the director. Cristina went on to a film career with appearances in El Poderoso Influjo de la Luna, Crime in the Family, The Sea and Time, and Last Days with Teresa. She also appeared in such television shows as High School and the second season of Chronicle of the Sunrise.

She was the artistic director of the Marsillach Acting Academy in Madrid.

== Filmography ==
- El poderoso influjo de la luna - (1981)
- Estoy en crisis - (1982)
- Últimas tardes con Teresa - (1983)
- The Trap - (1985)
- Every Time We Say Goodbye - (1986)
- Opera - (1987)
- Days of Inspector Ambrosio - (1988)
- I ragazzi di via Panisperna - (1989)
- Marrakech Express - (1989)
- 'O Re - (1989)
- Women in Arms - (1991)
