= The Devil's Honey =

1986 film directed by Lucio Fulci

- Italian theatrical release poster by Studio Lapis
- Directed by: Lucio Fulci
- Screenplay by: Jesús Balcázar; Lucio Fulci; Ludovica Marineo; Vincenzo Salviani
- Story by: Jesús Balcázar; Lucio Fulci; Ludovica Marineo; Vincenzo Salviani
- Produced by: Vincenzo Salviani
- Starring: Blanca Marsillach; Brett Halsey; Stefano Madia; Corinne Cléry
- Cinematography: Alejandro Ulloa
- Edited by: Vincenzo Tomassi; Emilio Oritz
- Music by: Claudio Natili
- Production companies: Selvaggia Film; Producciones Balcazar S.a.s.
- Distributed by: Selvaggia Film (Italy); Vision Films (Spain)
- Release dates: 21 August 1986 (Rome & Allesandria); 23 July 1987 (Spain)
- Running time: 83 minutes
- Countries: Italy; Spain
- Language: Italian

The Devil's Honey (Italian: Il miele del diavolo) is a 1986 erotic drama film directed by Lucio Fulci.

== Plot ==
Musician Johnny and his girlfriend Jessica are a young couple who constantly have sex. Meanwhile, Dr. Wendell Simpson is a surgeon who never has sex with his wife Carol. Carol discovers that Simpson regularly visits prostitutes.

While riding around on his motorcycle, Johnny falls and hits his head on a stone plate. Because of this, he eventually collapses into a coma brought on by an apparent subdural hematoma.

Carol demands a divorce from Simpson when he is called to the hospital in the operating room to perform emergency brain surgery on Johnny. Because of this, Simpson's mind wanders during the operation, and Johnny dies on the operating table. While leaving the hospital, Simpson is chased by the grief-stricken Jessica, who swears revenge on Johnny's "killer".

Jessica starts sending threatening notes and making harassing calls to Simpson. At a golf club, Simpson and Carol are playing when they decide to make another attempt to patch up their marriage. The two start having sex when the telephone rings. Simpson eventually feels compelled to answer despite the urgency of Carol's needs. He rolls off her to answer, but the phone rings off before Simpson can answer. Frustrated, Carol gets dressed and walks out on him for good. The telephone rings again. After picking it up, Simpson hears Jessica's voice again saying, "Why did you let him die?"

Jessica becomes more deranged with grief, spending hours watching home videos of Johnny. The next day, she pulls a gun on Simpson as he gets into his car to go to the hospital. Forcing him to drive to her house, where she chloroforms Simpson and ties him up. Simpson regains consciousness to find an Alsatian dog barking at him, tied up inches away from him. Outside, Jessica smashes his car with an axe. Jessica says that she intends to kill Simpson, but only when ready. Jessica then forces Simpson to eat dog food and lick her bare abdomen smeared with his own blood from a wound she inflicts on him. Simpson finds himself attracted to her. Jessica forces Simpson at gunpoint to go to the beach outside the house. While dragging him on a leash, she announces her intentions to drown him and almost does so by holding him under water. However, she then changes her mind, pulls Simpson out of the water and revives him.

Jessica starts recalling some of the cruelties and excesses of which Johnny was capable. A baby that she was carrying from their affair miscarried at an early stage. Her pet dog eventually dies, and Jessica buries him on the beach. A melancholic Jessica engages in further sexual games with Simpson and eventually recalls something that changes her mind about Johnny.

Months earlier, during a vacation getaway to Venice, Italy, Johnny bought Jessica a bracelet to symbolize their love for one another. Johnny and Jessica then went to a movie theater with one of Johnny's friends, Nicky. The two lovers kissed during the movie, but Jessica was horrified to discover that Johnny was simultaneously letting Nicky go down on him. The memory of this ménage-a-trois was the last straw.

Jessica, seeing the self-destructive person Johnny was, walks to the ocean and throws the bracelet that Johnny bought for her into the water. Jessica returns to the house, unties Simpson and announces that he is free to go. Jessica goes to her bedroom, disrobes, lies down on her bed, and puts the pistol to her head, intending to kill herself. Simpson walks into her bedroom and stops her from committing suicide by having sex with her. The two later lay side by side in bed when Simpson recites a poem to Jessica: "When you have spent your life like a fortune that never seemed to end. A second chance will come like a long lost friend. Great joy will fill you and flush you hot. No more will you ever be cool for she is the Devil's honey pot. And you'll drown in her you fool."

== Cast ==
- Blanca Marsillach as Jessica
- Brett Halsey as Dr. Wendell Simpson
- Stefano Madia as Johnny
- Corinne Cléry as Carol Simpson
- Paula Molina as Sandra
- Bernard Seray as Nicky

== Production ==
The Devil's Honey was a co-production between Selvaggia Film in Rome and Producciones Balcazar in Barcelona. It began filming on February 21, 1986 and was shot in Spain and France.

== Release ==
The Devil's Honey was first screened on August 21, 1986 in Rome and Alessandria on August 21, 1986. During its theatrical run in Italy, it had a 83 minute runtime. It was released in Spain on July 23, 1987 with an 85 minute runtime.

In the United States, a cut version of the film was released on VHS under the title Dangerous Obsession by A.I.P. Home Video. The film was released as The Devil's Honey on Blu-ray by Severin Films in 2017 and by 88 Films on May 18, 2020. It was released on 4K Blu-ray in May 2024 by Severin.

== See also ==
- List of Italian films of 1986
