= Dan Hotels =

Hotel chain

- Industry: Hotels
- Founded: 1947; 79 years ago
- Headquarters: Tel Aviv, Israel
- Number of locations: 18
- Area served: Israel, India
- Revenue: ₪120,000,000 loss (2020)
- Number of employees: around 3,600
- Website: www.danhotels.co.il
- Footnotes; Data from Tel Aviv Stock Exchange

Dan Hotels is an Israeli hotel chain established in 1947. The chain owns 18 hotels in Israel with 3,669 rooms, a convention center and a hotel training center, as well as a 226-room hotel in Bangalore, India.

== History ==
In June 1947, Yekutiel and Shmuel Federmann leased Kaete Dan, a small guest house on Tel Aviv beach from its then-owner, Abraham Stamberg. They built the Dan hotel around the original pension, finally purchasing the Kaete Dan in 1956. Adopting the name from the previous owner, they formed the Dan Hotels Corporation. The Dan Tel Aviv in 1953.

In June 1982 its shares were listed for trading on the Tel Aviv Stock Exchange.

In 2017, Dan Hotels opened its first overseas property at Bangalore, India. The 226 room hotel is named 'The Den' and is located in the Whitefield district of the city. In June 2018, it opened the Link & Hub hotel in Tel Aviv. In December 2018, Dan hotels was in talk to purchase the hotel properties of the Israel Land Development Company which owns the Rimonim hotel chain.

== See also ==
- Tourism in Israel
- Economy of Israel
