= Vow of Chastity =

1976 film by Joe D'Amato

- Directed by: Joe D'Amato
- Screenplay by: George Eastman
- Story by: George Eastman
- Produced by: Oscar Santaniello
- Starring: Jacques Dufilho; Gillian Bray; Enzo Colajacono; Laura Gemser
- Cinematography: Joe D'Amato
- Edited by: Bruno Micheli
- Music by: Roberto Pregadio
- Production companies: Mago Film; Coralta Cinematografica
- Distributed by: Variety Distribution
- Release date: 1976
- Running time: 95 minutes
- Country: Italy
- Language: Italian

Vow of Chastity (Italian: Voto di castità) is a 1976 Italian sex comedy film. It was directed by Joe D'Amato, who also acted as cinematographer. The story and screenplay were by George Eastman.

The film's tonal switches between light comedy and eroticism, along with serious themes such as the protagonist's Oedipus complex and a horrific dream-sequence with a splatter element, were both criticised and praised.

Voto di castità is considered noteworthy for bringing Joe D'Amato and Laura Gemser together for the first time. They soon developed a friendship and professional partnership. Gemser starred in many D'Amato films and worked for his productions as costume designer.

== Cast ==
- Jacques Dufilho as Annibale
- Gillian Bray as Lisa
- Enzo Colajacono as Andrea
- Laura Gemser as Iliana
- Francesco Mulè as Teodoro
- Flavia Sabiana (Sofia Dionisio)
- Gastone Pescucci
- Marzia Tedeschi
- Piero Santipulci
- Antonio D'Auria
- Maria Carisi
- Giovanna Chemeri
- Rosa Coppolino

== Production ==
In an interview with the Italian film magazine Nocturno, Gemser stated that although this was a comedy, her role was more erotic than funny since she was nude most of the time, even though the situations were comedic - or at least were supposed to be.

== Release ==
The film was theatrically released in Italy. The French title was Voeu de chasteté, and according to Marco Giusti, the international title was Girl in a Seminary.

Voto di castità was also released on DVD in Italy by CG Entertainment in their "Cinekult" series, featuring the film in its Italian language version as an anamorphic widescreen transfer, with Italian subtitles. The DVD also included an interview with Eastman and the film in its super 8 version.

The film had previously been released on VHS by Universal-Video, Magnum 3B, and Shendene (in its series "I maestri dell'erotismo - Il cinema di Joe D'Amato").

The film is now distributed worldwide by Variety Distribution.

== Reception ==
Marco Giusti calls the film Italian: commediola scollacciata, lit. 'a little dirty comedy' and sees its major value in the fact that it brought together D'Amato and Gemser.

Gordiano Lupi concurred with that judgement. He observed that the film contaminates comedy with erotic film proper, pointing out the length of Gemser's nude ballet-like dance in her bedroom in front of the boy. Lupi also noted the splatter-horror influence in the dreamlike sequence. However, he concluded that it is not a great film precisely because of its indecision between its comic and serious aspects, such as the main character's oedipodal problem. Good actors were misused, and some scenes seem to have been inserted to draw out the runtime.

Sébastien Gayraud, in contrast, applauded the film as one that is more than a mere sidenote in D'Amato's filmography and deserves to be rediscovered. He observed parallels between the morbid dream-sequences of Voto di castità and D'Amato's previous film Emanuelle's Revenge (1975), and viewed the boy Andrea as the first of D'Amato's impotent and frustrated male anti-heroes - a type that would return in Beyond the Darkness (1979) and A Lustful Mind (1986).

== Bibliography ==
- Gayraud, Sébastien (2015). Joe D'Amato : le réalisateur fantôme (in French). Artus films. p. 63. ISBN 978-2954843513.
- Giusti, Marco (1999). Dizionario dei film italiani stracult (in Italian). Sperling & Kupfer. p. 847. ISBN 9788820029197.
- Lupi, Gordiano (2004). Erotismo, orrore e pornografia secondo Joe D'Amato (in Italian). Mondo Ignoto. pp. 52–53. ISBN 9788889084496.
