= Ator, the Fighting Eagle =

1982 film by Joe D'Amato

- Directed by: Joe D'Amato
- Written by: Jose Maria Sanchez (as Sherry Russel)
- Produced by: Alex Susmann
- Starring: Miles O'Keeffe; Sabrina Siani; Ritza Brown; Edmund Purdom
- Cinematography: Joe D'Amato
- Edited by: David Framer
- Music by: Carlo Maria Cordio
- Production companies: Filmarage; Metaxa Corporation
- Release date: 7 October 1982 (Italy)
- Country: Italy
- Languages: Italian; English
- Box office: $1.2 million

Ator, the Fighting Eagle (Italian: Ator l'invincibile 'Ator the Invincible') is a 1982 Italian "Sword-and-sandal" adventure-fantasy film directed by Joe D'Amato. It stars Miles O'Keeffe, Sabrina Siani, Ritza Brown, and Edmund Purdom. The story follows the eponymous warrior setting out on a journey to bring his wife Sandra home after her kidnapping by the Spider Cult. It was followed by the sequels Ator 2 – L'invincibile Orion, Iron Warrior, and Quest for the Mighty Sword.

== Plot ==
As the film opens, a baby named Ator is born with a birthmark that signals he will someday destroy the Spider Cult, which currently holds power over the land. Fearing this prophecy, the leader of the cult – High Priest of The Ancient One, Dakkar (Dakar) – attempts to kill the baby. Baby Ator's birthmark is covered up and he is whisked off to a village far away where he is given to a couple to raise as their own. Years later, Ator (O'Keefe), now in love with his sister Sunya (Brown), asks his father for permission to marry her. Ator's father reveals to Ator that he is adopted, and can therefore marry Sunya if he likes. On the day of their wedding, the village is raided by the Spider Cult's soldiers and several women are taken, including Sunya.

After pursuing the soldiers, Ator soon finds himself training with Griba, a warrior who is an enemy of The Ancient One and also the person who whisked him away at his birth. Griba disappears, after which Ator is kidnapped by Amazons, nearly seduced by a witch, and undergoes a quest to retrieve a magical mirrored shield. While kidnapped by the Amazons, Ator is "won" by Roon (Siani), a fierce blonde thief he helped earlier in the film. Roon is enamored with Ator, so she decides to flee with him and assist him during his quest. Ator successfully obtains the mirror, then uses it to fight and defeat Dakkar. His victory is muddied by the revelation that Griba is actually Dakkar's predecessor and had trained Ator so that he could retake his position as High Priest.

Ator defeats Griba, however, leaving him to be devoured by the offspring of The Ancient One, a giant spider that dwells within the temple. To ensure that the cult does not return, Ator then provokes and kills The Ancient One itself. Afterward, with Roon having perished while infiltrating the temple, Ator and Sunya head back to their village, presumably to live in peace together.

== Cast ==
- Miles O'Keeffe as Ator
- Sabrina Siani as Roon
- Ritza Brown as Sunya
- Edmund Purdom as Griba
- Dakar as High Priest of The Spider (credited as Dakkar)
- Laura Gemser as Indun
- Alessandra Vazzoler as Woman In The Tavern (credited as Chandra Vazzoler)
- Nello Pazzafini as Bardak (credited as Nat Williams)
- Jean Lopez as Nordya
- Olivia Goods as Queen

== Production ==
Michele Soavi was hired to write the script for Ator, the Fighting Eagle. He did it in collaboration with Marco Modugno. Both had previously worked together on the film Bambulè (1979) with Modugno as director and Soavi as assistant director. The film was developed under the working title of Fantasy.

Later, the script was revised by José Maria Sanchez and the film's director Joe D'Amato. D'Amato said in an interview that the script was "written by Jose Maria Sanchez", without mentioning Soavi or Modugno. In the credits, the pseudonym "Sherry Russel" was used.

In a statement printed in Nocturno, director Joe D'Amato complained that although Miles O'Keeffe, the actor who played Ator, had a nice athletic physique and was a really nice guy (Italian: un ragazzo d'oro), he recited his lines badly and was behaving listlessly during fight scenes. D'Amato praised the weapons master Franco Ukmar for doing "an incredible job" on him.

== Release ==
Ator, the Fighting Eagle passed the Italian censorship board on 14 September 1982 and was released in Italy on 7 October. It was released in the United States on 11 March 1983.

== Reception and legacy ==
Variety described the film as a "dull, incredibly silly fantasy adventure" and that the director "creates no atmosphere, with picture's exteriors never achieving any period feel".

The Canadian magazine FFWD stated that "there are four Ator movies in total, and each one is staggeringly awful".

The film was featured in Season 12 of Mystery Science Theater 3000 on November 22, 2018.

It was parodied by RiffTrax, consisted of former MST3K alumni Michael J. Nelson, Kevin Murphy and Bill Corbett, prior to the show's take of the film on March 10, 2017.

== See also ==
- Ator 2 – L'invincibile Orion
- List of Italian films of 1982
