= Le notti peccaminose di Pietro l'Aretino =

1972 film

- Directed by: Manlio Scarpelli
- Screenplay by: Manlio Scarpelli; Marcello Coscia
- Produced by: Tiziano Longo
- Starring: Adriana Asti; Gianni Musy
- Cinematography: Aristide Massaccesi
- Edited by: Mauro Bonanni
- Music by: Gianfranco Plenizio
- Release date: 1972
- Country: Italy
- Language: Italian

Le notti peccaminose di Pietro l'Aretino ('The sinful nights of Pietro l'Aretino') is a 1972 commedia sexy all'italiana film co-written and directed by Manlio Scarpelli.

== Cast ==
- Adriana Asti as Nana
- Gianni Musy as the painter
- Piero Vida as Cuor Contento
- Elena Veronese as Prudenza
- Ennio Biasciucci as Giannetto
- Giacomo Rizzo as Polonio
- Melù Valente as Angelica
- Lucia Modugno as Margherita
- Luciana Turina as the witch
- Salvatore Baccaro as Satanasso
- Tiberio Murgia as villager
- Ignazio Leone as blind man

== Production ==
The film was produced by Peg. Lamberto Bava served as assistant director. Ingrid Thulin was originally cast in the role of Nana. It was shot back to back, in the same sets, with Novelle licenziose di vergini vogliose by Joe D'Amato, who in this film served as cinematographer. It is the first decameronico film based on the works by Pietro Aretino, anticipating by two weeks the release of the more successful Aretino's Stories of the Three Lustful Daughters by Silvio Amadio.

== Release ==
The film was distributed in Italian cinemas by Peg starting from 4 August 1972.

== Reception ==
Italian film critic Manlio Gomarasca wrote: "In its intentions, we are in the more noble side of the decamerotici, but the results paradoxically place the film in the trashier camp", mostly because of "the lack of money and a very weak cast".
