= Joe D'Amato =

Italian film director (1936–1999)

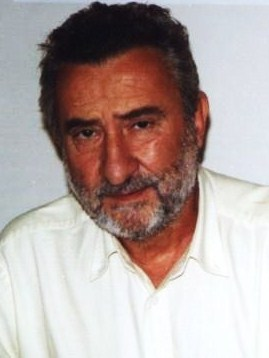
- D'Amato at the 1996 Cannes Film Festival
- Born: Aristide Massaccesi; 15 December 1936; Rome, Kingdom of Italy
- Died: 23 January 1999 (aged 62); Monterotondo, Rome, Italy
- Other name: See below
- Occupations: Film director; film producer; cinematographer; screenwriter; actor
- Years active: 1961–1999

Signature
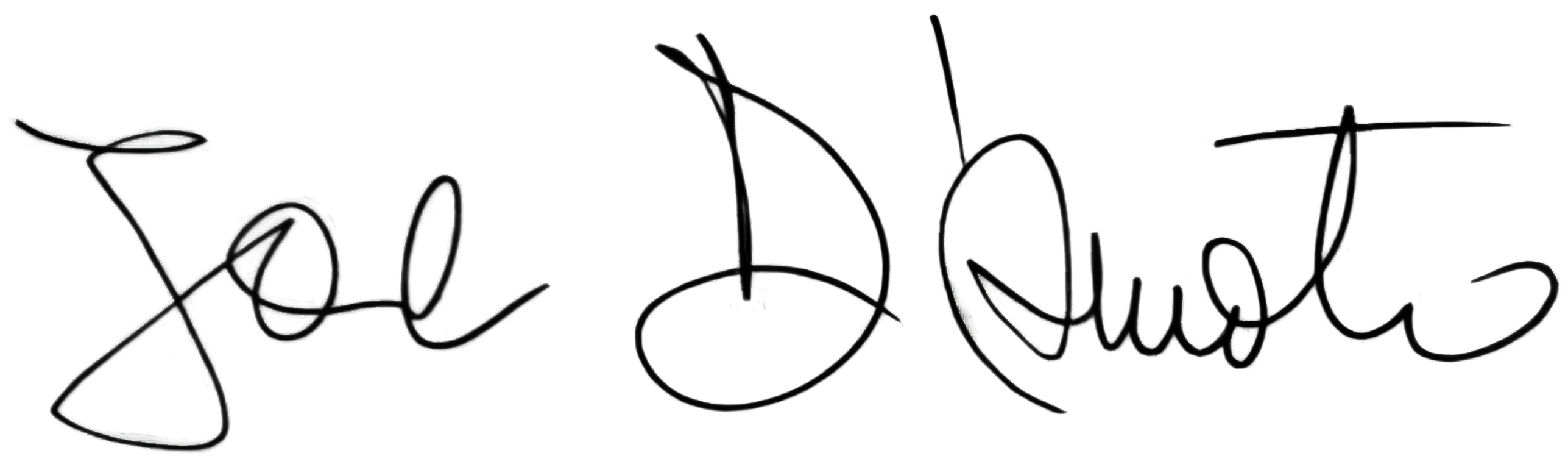

Aristide Massaccesi (15 December 1936 – 23 January 1999), known professionally as Joe D'Amato, was an Italian film director, producer, cinematographer, and screenwriter who worked in many genres (westerns, decamerotici, peplum, war films, swashbuckler, comedy, fantasy, postapocalyptic film, and erotic thriller) but is best known for his horror, erotic and adult films.

D'Amato worked in the 1950s as electric and set photographer, in the 1960s as camera operator, and from 1969 onwards as cinematographer. Starting in 1972, he directed and co-directed around 200 films under numerous pseudonyms, regularly acting as cinematographer as well. Starting in the early 1980s, D'Amato produced many of his own and other directors' genre films through the companies he founded or co-founded, the best known being Filmirage. From 1979 to 1982 and from 1993 to 1999, D'Amato also produced and directed about 120 adult films.

Among his best known erotic films are his five entries into the Black Emanuelle series of films starring Laura Gemser (1976–1978) and his horror/pornography crossover films Erotic Nights of the Living Dead and Porno Holocaust (both shot in Santo Domingo in 1979). In the horror genre, he is above all remembered for his films Beyond the Darkness (1979) and Antropophagus (1980), which have gained cult status, as well as Absurd (1981).

== Biography ==
=== Early life and work (1936–1969) ===
Joe D'Amato was born on 15 December 1936 in Rome, Italy. His father was Renato Massaccesi, who after an incident on a ship had been declared a war invalid and had started to work at the Istituto Luce in Rome first as electrician, fixing power generators left by the United States army at Cinecittà, and then as chief photographic technician. In 1950, at the age of 14, D'Amato joined his father at work together with his brothers Carlo and Fernando (called Nando). Being the most enterprising of the three sons, D'Amato took on the task of delivering the movie cameras his father sold. D'Amato also assisted in the dubbing of Italian film productions and designed title and end credits with Eugenio Bava, cutting the letters out by hand. In 1952, D'Amato worked as a still photographer on the set of The Golden Coach, later as electric. In the 1960s, D'Amato eventually moved on to work as a camera operator on numerous films including Mario Bava's Hercules in the Haunted World.

=== First work as cinematographer and director (1969–1975) ===
In 1969, Piero Livi's Pelle di bandito and Silvio Amadio's No Man's Island (Italian: L'Isola delle Svedesi) were D'Amato's first films as cinematographer. In the next few years, D'Amato continued to work as cinematographer on Italian productions such as Umberto Lenzi's A Quiet Place to Kill, Massimo Dallamano's What Have You Done to Solange? and some of Demofilo Fidani's low-budget Spaghetti Westerns.

D'Amato took on the role of director for the first time in 1972. He started out with a number of small western films (Go Away! Trinity Has Arrived in Eldorado and A Bounty Killer in Trinity) and decamerotici (More Sexy Canterbury Tales and Novelle licenziose di vergini vogliose) which he partly directed, partly co-directed before going on to direct the gothic horror film Death Smiles on a Murderer (1973) and the war film Heroes in Hell (1974), both starring Klaus Kinski. D'Amato briefly relinquished directing and reverted to cinematography in films such as Luigi Batzella's The Devil's Wedding Night, Steve Carver's The Arena and five films directed by Alberto De Martino: Crime Boss, The Killer Is on the Phone, Counselor at Crime, The Antichrist, and – two years later – Strange Shadows in an Empty Room. When D'Amato was in Canada shooting a sleigh ride sequence for Lucio Fulci's Challenge to White Fang, the film's producer Ermanno Donati asked him to stay and direct the adventure film Red Coats for him, in which D'Amato used the pseudonym "Joe D'Amato" for the first time. It turned a good profit, and D'Amato later considered it his best film in this period.

=== First films with Laura Gemser and the Black Emanuelle series (1975–1977) ===
D'Amato's next film, Emanuelle's Revenge (1975), which he co-directed with Bruno Mattei (who remains uncredited because D'Amato was a "rising name"), was one of several films at the time with titles that alluded to the successful French erotic film Emmanuelle (1974). In retrospect, it was a kind of turning point in D'Amato's career, being his first pornographic film – though still softcore.

In his next film, the commedia sexy Voto di castità (1976), scripted by George Eastman), D'Amato met Laura Gemser, who would star in many of his films. In the 1980s and early 1990s, she would also regularly work as a costume designer for his productions. In this first film, she only played the small part of a French maid, but it was during the shoot that D'Amato got the idea to use her as star in his next film.

Eva nera, an erotic drama, stars Gemser as a topless snake dancer alongside Jack Palance and Gabriele Tinti – her future husband. The film was produced by Harry Alan Towers and Lucio Fulcisano and shot both on location in Hong Kong and at the Elios Studios near Rome.

Gemser, who had previously starred in Bitto Albertini's Black Emanuelle (1975), went on to shoot the following five films of the Black Emanuelle series under D'Amato's direction. (Albertini, on the other hand, had to find a new actress for his own Black Emanuelle 2 (1976) – a sequel only in name.) Although the main character's name in the Black Emanuelle series alludes to the original French Emmanuelle, it is spelled slightly differently in order to avoid copyright lawsuits. Also, the character herself is different; Black Emanuelle is an international reporter and photographer who travels to exotic locations. D'Amato added some violence and horror to the series, such as the fake snuff film footage in Emanuelle in America, a gang rape scene in Emanuelle Around the World (1977), and gore scenes in the cannibal film Emanuelle and the Last Cannibals. As D'Amato later remembered, this "was a very good period in my life. Movie business was very good. We travelled round the world, finding new and fascinating locations for our movies."

=== The Caribbean phase (1978–1979) ===
Of the 12 films D'Amato directed in 1978 and 1979, 9 were shot in the Dominican Republic. In a 1982 interview, he said that once the trip was paid for, the costs were low and the setting suggestive ("the Caribbean... all for free"; Italian: "i Caraibi... tutto gratis").

The first time D'Amato went to Santo Domingo was in May 1978 for the erotic horror film Papaya, Love Goddess of the Cannibals. He returned there in September to shoot the mercenaries-at-war film Tough to Kill.

In mid-October 1978, back in Italy, D'Amato started shooting the nunsploitation film Images in a Convent, and in early 1979, which was to become a particularly productive year, he directed the violent erotic thriller Il porno shop della settima strada (The Pleasure Shop on Seventh Avenue) on location in New York, both films produced by Franco Gaudenzi's company Kristal Film. From late June to early July 1979, D'Amato went to South Tyrol to shoot and direct the horror film Buio Omega starring Kieran Canter and Cinzia Monreale, a remake of Mino Guerrini's The Third Eye produced by Dario Rossetti and Ermanno Donati with music by Goblin.

Immediately afterwards, D'Amato went back to Santo Domingo to film Paradiso blu, an Italian counterpart to The Blue Lagoon starring Anna Bergman and Lucia Ramirez, and the voodoo-themed Orgasmo nero (Sex and Black Magic) starring Ramirez, Susan Scott and Richard Harrison, before directing two films combining hardcore pornography and horror – Porno Holocaust and Le notti erotiche dei morti viventi (Erotic Nights of the Living Dead) – as well as three adult thrillers: Hard Sensation, Porno Esotic Love and Sesso Nero. For Porno Esotic Love, D'Amato reused material from Eva nera (1976), especially those scenes D'Amato had shot with Laura Gemser in Hong Kong. (Eva nera had done very poorly at the Italian box office and therefore was still relatively unknown.)

=== First work as producer (1979–1982) ===
The voodoo-themed Sesso nero, written by George Eastman, was the last film D'Amato shot in the Caribbean, at the end of 1979, and the first film D'Amato produced on his own, through his newly founded company, P.C.M. (Produzioni Cinematografiche Massaccesi). Of the Caribbean group of films it received the earliest theatrical release – the films only being released gradually throughout 1980 and 1981.

After his return from the Caribbean, D'Amato also co-founded Filmirage and used the companies to produce and direct the gore film Antropophagus (1980, produced through P.C.M. and Filmirage) and its follow-up, the slasher film Absurd (1981, co-produced by Filmirage and Metaxa), both of which starred George Eastman and later became cult films for fans of extreme cinema.

D'Amato also founded and co-founded two further production companies, "Cinema 80" and "M.A.D." (an acronym for [Aristide] Massaccesi, Alessandroni, and [Donatella] Donati) on 15 January 1980 and 9 January 1981, respectively. For M.A.D., Alessandroni, an engineer, provided the funding, while his son acted as producer on set. Donatella Donati, the daughter of Ermanno Donati, became D'Amato's assistant and constant collaborator, usually acting as production secretary and assistant director.

The two companies were the main vehicles for D'Amato's film production of this period. From 1980 until 1982, D'Amato produced 14 hardcore pornographic films through both companies (Cinema 80: 9 films, M.A.D.: 5), 10 of which he directed and lensed himself, while 3 of the films (Blue erotic climax, Labbra vogliose and Le porno investigatrici) were directed by Claudio Bernabei. Officially, Bernabei was both executive manager and director, his pseudonym Alexander (or Alexandre) Borsky being used for almost all directorial credits although the films were for the most part directed by D'Amato personally, who was only given credit in the non-committal phrase "a Joe D'Amato film" (Italian: un film di Joe D'Amato) used for marketing purposes. The reason for this lay in avoiding one of two criminal charges per film since the state only charged the executive manager of the company and the director; them being the same person, only one charge was brought forth. One notable exception was Porno video (1981; sometimes: Pornovideo), which was directed entirely by Giuliana Gamba (under the pseudonym Therese Dunn); it was the first film D'Amato produced for another director – a practice he would start expanding six years later in his Filmirage period. Il succo del sesso (1982; a punning title which can mean both "The Essence of Sex" and "The Juice of Sex") was the only film of this period that was directed but not produced by D'Amato, being a "Promo Film" production of Giovanni Perrucci's.

The average Cinema 80 or M.A.D. film cost 55 million lire, was shot in 10 days, edited over a period of two months, and had a generic title such as Super climax, Super hard love or Voglia di sesso (literally: Lust for Sex). A group of three films produced through Cinema 80 stands out. In 1981, building on Tinto Brass's Caligula (1979), D'Amato produced, shot and directed Caligula... The Untold Story in both a hardcore and a softcore version, starring David Brandon, Laura Gemser and Gabriele Tinti. It recounted the final days of the Roman Emperor Caligula and was followed by two purely hardcore pornographic films – Una vergine per l'impero romano and Messalina orgasmo imperiale – in which D'Amato reused sets and costumes from the first film, albeit on a significantly lower budget. The three films were signed by D'Amato as director under different pseudonyms and released separately in December 1982, May 1983 and July 1983. They have been called his "porno-peplum trilogy".

Messalina orgasmo imperiale (shot in 1982) also happened to be the last film of this period. Another hardcore film that D'Amato originally intended to shoot himself for producer Riccardo Billy in co-production with a Chinese company, Love in Hong Kong (1983, starring Mark Shannon and Marianne Aubert), ended up being entirely delegated to his assistant Bernabei for lack of time, who directed the film on location in Hong Kong. It survives only in a truncated softcore version.

=== The Filmirage years (1982–1993) ===
In 1980, D'Amato had taken over a company from producer Ermanno Donati. D'Amato had renamed the company to "Filmirage" and used it to produce his own and, from 1987 onwards, also other directors' films for the international market.

In 1982, D'Amato used Filmirage to produce, shoot and direct the first film of the Ator series: Ator l'invincibile (Ator, the Fighting Eagle) starring Miles O'Keeffe and Sabrina Siani, which was directly inspired by Conan the Barbarian. It was followed by Ator 2 - L'invincibile Orion (English titles: The Blade Master and Cave Dwellers) the following year, in which O'Keefe was flanked by Lisa Foster.

In 1983 and 1984, D'Amato produced and shot the post-apocalyptic action films Endgame (1983) starring Al Cliver, George Eastman, Laura Gemser and Gordon Mitchell, which D'Amato directed alone, and 2020 Texas Gladiators (1984) starring Al Cliver and Sabrina Siani, which D'Amato co-directed with George Eastman. The films follow the success of Mad Max (1979) and Mad Max 2 (1981).

In 1984 and early 1985, D'Amato briefly reactivated his company M.A.D. to produce 10 hardcore pornographic films, all of which were directed by Luca Damiano and starred Marina Hedman. D'Amato is reported to have collaborated on some of these himself as well, although it remains speculative in which function and on which ones. Later in 1985 D'Amato left hardcore pornography behind and for a period of eight years exclusively shot softcore and horror films. According to an interview D'Amato gave in 1990, hardcore, as opposed to softcore, had only been profitable the first four years in the late 1970s and early 1980s while the novelty and controversy lasted.

D'Amato began this hardcore-free period by directing four softcore dramas set during fascism in Italy and starring Lilli Carati and Laura Gemser: L'alcova (The Alcove), Il piacere (The Pleasure), Lussuria (A Lustful Mind), and Voglia di guardare (Midnight Gigolo). The four films recall the style and themes of Tinto Brass's La chiave (The Key) while their plots and characters are not interconnected in any way.

Together with Harry Alan Towers, D'Amato co-produced Warrior Queen (working title: Pompeii), shot in 1985 at the Elios Studios near Rome to cash in on the success of the miniseries The Last Days of Pompeii (1984). It was a sword-and-sandal film starring Sybil Danning, Donald Pleasence and David Brandon and was directed by Chuck Vincent. In an interview, Larry Revene, Vincent's usual cinematographer, remembered that he worked on the sync sound for this film instead, because "Aristide shot it. He wasn't only a director/producer, he was also a cameraman." In the United States, the film had a brief theatrical run in a cut R rated version before being released in a longer version on video.

There followed a phase in which D'Amato directed softcore films predominantly in the United States, often takes on popular American films. First, he went to New Orleans to produce and shoot two films starring Jessica Moore as the novelist Sarah Asproon: 11 Days, 11 Nights (1987) and Top Model (1988). 11 Days, 11 Nights was inspired by Adrian Lyne's film 9½ Weeks but reversed the roles with the woman being the dissolute character; it was a commercial success. In 1989, D'Amato's main actress was Valentine Demy with whom he produced and directed Afternoon and Dirty Love, the latter reminiscent of another of Adrian Lyne's films, Flashdance. After these, D'Amato produced and directed two erotic dramas with Tara Buckman: Blue Angel Cafe and High Finance Woman.

Beyond producing his own softcore films, D'Amato also used Filmirage to produce other directors' films: Michele Soavi's debut Stage Fright (which was also the debut of D'Amato's son Daniele Massaccesi as assistant cameraman), Deran Serafian's Interzone, Umberto Lenzi's Ghosthouse (La casa 3) and Hitcher In The Dark, Fabrizio Laurenti's Witchery (La casa 4) and The Crawlers (Troll 3), George Eastman's Metamorphosis, Claudio Fragasso's Troll 2 and Beyond Darkness (La casa 5), Franco Molé's The Room of Words, and Lucio Fulci's Door to Silence. D'Amato not only produced, but also partially directed the horror film Killing Birds and but for the first scene directed the sharksploitation drama Deep Blood.

At the beginning of the 1990s, D'Amato revisited his Ator series with a concluding entry entitled Quest for the Mighty Sword, featuring the Son of Ator. Then, he revived the character of Sarah Asproon in 11 Days, 11 Nights 2, this time played by Kristine Rose and again set in New Orleans. With Rose as protagonist, D'Amato also directed Passion's Flower, a remake of The Postman Always Rings Twice, before shooting two softcore films starring Carmen di Pietro in 1991, both with a more violent angle than the preceding ones: Devil in the Flesh follows a group of mercenaries who encounter some nurses at an isolated hospital, and Dangerous Obsession tells of a woman who turns the tables on her assailant. After these, D'Amato directed Return from Death (Frankenstein 2000) (1992), his last horror film, which combined a modern take on the traditional Frankenstein story with elements of the rape and revenge film.

In 1993, inspired by the success of the Chinese erotic comedy Sex and Zen (1991), D'Amato then went to the Philippines to shoot a number of Asian themed softcore films, for which he often used Chinese pseudonyms. Among them are such diverse films as Chinese Kamasutra, China and Sex and I racconti della camera rossa (translation: The Tales of the Red Chamber; named after China's classical novel Dream of the Red Chamber), the latter two structurally and thematically reminiscent of Italian decamerotici.

=== Later work and death (1993–1999) ===
Later in 1993, D'Amato went back to predominantly producing and directing hardcore pornography. In order to return to adult filmmaking more easily, D'Amato initially teamed up with Luca Damiano, with whom he shot roughly 20 films before continuing on his own. Although video had become the standard for adult films, D'Amato continued to shoot on 35mm film for a few years before finally transitioning to video for his last productions in 1997 and 1998 – a development which he saw critically: When shooting on video, there was little difference between the individual films in terms of profit, which helped minimise production risk, but the overall profit and hence the quality of the individual productions that were shot on video were lower compared to productions shot on film. The crew on an early 35mm shoot such as Juliet & Romeo had been much larger, including lighting staff, camera assistants, make-up artists, and set decorators; dubbing was done in post-production.

Among D'Amato's best known films from this late hardcore period are his collaborations with Rocco Siffredi (Tarzan X – Shame of Jane, Marco Polo, Marquis de Sade, Torero) and Kelly Trump (Messalina, Kamasutra, Lolita), his pornographic versions of Shakespearean drama (Juliet & Romeo, Anthony and Cleopatra, Othello 2000), westerns (Outlaws, Calamity Jane), swashbucklers (Raiders), the Bible (Sodom & Gamorra), Greco-Roman mythology (Olympus, Amor & Psyche, Ulysses, Hercules – A Sex Adventure), Roman emperors (Nero – Orgy of Fire, Caligula – The Deviant Emperor) and other famous people (Robin Hood, Goya, Amadeus Mozart, Thief of Love – Giacomo Casanova, Rudy – Valentino's story, Scarface). Two recurring actresses in his films from 1996 to 1999 were Selen (Raw & Naked, Queen of the Elephants, Sahara, and Selen the Girl from Treasure Island) and Éva Henger, with whom he shot the time travel films Experiences and Experiences 2, a trilogy on the capital sins, Phantom (using footage from the silent film The Phantom of the Opera), and Showgirl. Whereas D'Amato's adult films were very rarely without a plot entirely, D'Amato stated in a 1997 interview that one had used to include more plot whereas now the only thing they wanted was porn – and very hard one at that: "double, triple, quadruple penetrations, anal ...".

In between shooting adult films from 1994 to 1999, D'Amato also made efforts at returning to genre films, four of which came to fruition. In 1995, he directed the erotic drama Provocation set in the Italian countryside of the 1930s starring Erika Savastani, and in 1997 the erotic comedy Top Girl set in and around an American TV station and the erotic thriller The Hyena starring Cinzia Roccaforte, which received a limited theatrical release in Italy. In 1998, D'Amato directed the swashbuckler I predatori delle Antille (aka Sexy Pirates), starring Anita Rinaldi.

On 23 January 1999, Joe D'Amato died of a heart attack in Monterotondo, a comune in the Metropolitan City of Rome Capital. According to Luigi Cozzi, his death happened unexpectedly while he was busy preparing a new film. His last film was the adult film Showgirl (1999), a take on Paul Verhoeven's Showgirls (1995).

== Names under which D'Amato is credited ==
=== Birthname ===
Throughout his career, D'Amato used his birthname Aristide Massaccesi only once for a directorial credit, namely for Death Smiles on a Murderer (1973). However, it was regularly used for other credits. For his first work as a camera operator, it was the only name he was credited with, and as a cinematographer, writer of stories and scriptwriter, he credited himself or was credited with it regularly until the early 1980s.

=== Pseudonyms ===
The first pseudonyms used by Aristide Massaccesi were his actor's credits in the Spaghetti Westerns Straniero... fatti il segno della croce! (1968) and Dead Men Don't Make Shadows (1970), for which he used puns on his birthname: Ariston Massachusetts and Arizona Massachusset, respectively.

His best-known pseudonym is the anglicized Joe D'Amato, which he first adopted as director of Giubbe Rosse (1975). In 1991, D'Amato stated he had discovered the name in some calendar and chosen to use it because it sounded promising: in its mixture of American and Italian, it was similar to those of Brian de Palma and Martin Scorsese. Joe D'Amato became the name Massaccesi was most associated with, even more than his birth name. D'Amato used this main pseudonym of his exclusively for credits as producer and director and not for credits as cinematographer or writer.

The pseudonym Federiko Slonisko, sometimes also spelt Federico Slonisco or any mixture of these two spellings (including the short form Fred and several other mis- or variant spellings), was regularly used for D'Amato's work as cinematographer starting in 1982.

The pseudonyms Federico Slonisco Jr. and Dan Slonisko (including variant spellings) are also sometimes considered to belong to D'Amato. However, D'Amato's son Daniele, a camera operator and cinematographer, started his career working for his father.

The pseudonym Michael Wotruba was used as D'Amato's directorial credit on:

- Novelle licenziose di vergini vogliose (1973) – also screenplay
- Pugni, pirati e karatè (1973)
- Diario di una vergine romana (1973)
- Heroes in Hell (1974) – also screenplay
- The Arena (1974) – Italian version: director; international version: second unit director

This pseudonym is also to be found as directorial credit for Death Smiles on a Murderer (1973) in the entry at Public Cinematographic Register, but was later changed to D'Amato's birthname for the release.

David Hills was used by D'Amato as a directorial pseudonym on the following films:

- Caligula... The Untold Story (1981) – also screenplay
- Ator, the Fighting Eagle (1982)
- Ator 2 - L'invincibile Orion (1983)
- Quest for the Mighty Sword (1990)
- Frankenstein 2000 (1991)
- I predatori delle Antille (1998)

David Hills was also used as directorial credit on an early announcement of Deep Blood (1989), but was exchanged by the allonym Raf Donato for the official release. As producer, D'Amato used this pseudonym on Troll 2 and Interzone.

For the last two films of D'Amato's "porno-peplum trilogy", Una vergine per l'impero and Messalina orgasmo imperiale (both released 1983), D'Amato used Dirk Frey as cinematographer and Robert Hall and O.J. Clarke as director, respectively.

The directorial credit of Il succo del sesso (1983), which D'Amato directed, reads Gilbert Damiano - an allusion to Gerard Damiano.

The pseudonym Peter Newton was used for D'Amato's credit as cinematographer on Paradiso blu (1980) and his directorial credit on Absurd (1981). For the latter, he also used Richard Haller for his credits as cinematographer and co-producer. Kevin Mancuso was used for the directorial credit on 2020 Texas Gladiators (1982); D'Amato co-directed the film with George Eastman so it can be considered a pseudonym for both Eastman and D'Amato. D'Amato used the name Dario Donati as director and editor on Convent of Sinners (1986) and as director on Delizia (1986).

The female pseudonym Joan Russell was used for D'Amato's directorial credit on Una tenera storia (1992). It was also used not for D'Amato, but for Donatella Donati and Antonio Tentori as story and screenwriting credit in Frankenstein 2000 (1992), which D'Amato produced and directed.

For his oriental films of 1993, D'Amato used a number of new pseudo-oriental pseudonyms. For I racconti della camera rossa he used Robert Yip as director, Lim Seng Yee as scenarist and Boy Tan Bien as cinematographer. For Chinese kamasutra he signed with the pseudonyms Chang Lee Sun (director), Fu Shen (scenarist) and Hsu Hsien (cinematographer). And for Il labirinto dei sensi, he signed his scenario with Leslie Wong while using Joe D'Amato and Federico Slonsiko for the directorial and cinematographic credits respectively.

=== Allonyms ===
An allonym is distinguished from a pseudonym in that it is the given name or pseudonym of a different person from the one who should be credited.

Romano Gastaldi, the pseudonym of Romano Scandariato, was used for the directorial credit on More Sexy Canterbury Tales (1972), which D'Amato directed while Scandariato was his assistant director, and for Fra' Tazio da Velletri (1973), which D'Amato left after a disagreement soon after the beginning of the shoot; Scandariato, his assistant, finished the film and was credited.

Oskar Faradine, the pseudonym of Oscar Santaniello, was used for the directorial credit on A Bounty Killer in Trinity. The film was reportedly directed by D'Amato, and Santaniello was the film's producer. Lupi, however, in his monograph on D'Amato, argues on qualitative grounds for Santaniello as the actual director.

Anna Bergman's name was also used for the directorial credit on Paradiso blu (1980). Bergman was the main actress, but D'Amato directed the film. Her name was used for the directorial credit because, according to Luigi Cozzi, the producer did not want it to be seen as an erotic film (for which D'Amato was already known at the time).

Alexandre Borsky, sometimes spelled Alexander or Borski, was the pseudonym of Claudio Bernabei. Bernabei stated in an interview that he created it with Walerian Borowczyk's name in mind. The Borsky pseudonym was used as directorial credit for 14 of the 15 films produced by D'Amato's companies M.A.D. and Cinema 80 from 1980 to 1982. Of these 14 films, Bernabei directed 3, D'Amato 11. In 1993 and 1994, D'Amato briefly reactivated this name as directorial credit for a small number of adult films starring Luana Borgia, which he directed while transitioning from softcore to hardcore again. According to an interview he gave in 1995, it was to camouflage his return.

Lucky Faar (or Farr) Delly, sometimes wrongly listed as a pseudonym of Joe D'Amato, was in reality the pseudonym of Luciano Fardelli, who acted as administrator of D'Amato's production company M.A.D. in 1984 and 1985. It was used as directorial credit for 10 films directed by Franco Lo Cascio; it is unclear in which of these films D'Amato acted as co-director.

Raf Donato, a variant of Raffaele Donato's name, was used for the directorial credit on Deep Blood (1989). According to D'Amato, Donato had planned to direct the film, but only directed the first scene. D'Amato directed the rest of the film.

== Personality ==
According to the actresses who worked with him, D'Amato was sociable, humorous with a sense of irony, amiable, and supportive; to some, he appeared like a father. Both Laura Gemser, with whom he worked together for a long time, and Monica Zanchi pointed out his adventurous and playful approach to filmmaking.

Gemser also remembered that D'Amato rarely got angry, and that when it happened, he usually took it with irony; when deeply angered, however, he would shout and curse and become insufferable. She also recalled that, much like herself, D'Amato fell asleep easily and anywhere, even in the breaks between rehearsals. Donatella Donati, his regular assistant since the mid-1970s, recalled this penchant as his biggest flaw; in Cannes, she once found him asleep on the office floor.

== Legacy ==
In November 1999, the Barcelona International Erotic Film Festival posthumously honoured D'Amato with its Ninfa Homenaje award.

=== Screenings ===
In 1995, Joe D'Amato was a special guest at the London film festival "Eurofest" which took place at the Everyman Cinema, Hampstead, where he gave an onstage interview to Mark Ashworth in between screenings of Stage Fright, Emanuelle and the Last Cannibals and Frankenstein 2000, followed by a signing session. Parts of the interview can be found on the Severin DVD release of Emanuelle in Bangkok.

Posthumously, on 14 April 2006, the Cinémathèque Française in Paris screened a D'Amato double feature from newly acquired theatrical prints under the title Le sang et la chair (translation: The Blood and the Flesh), consisting of Antropophagus and Le sexe noir (both 1980).

The Joe D'Amato Horror Festival, under the art direction of Paolo Ruffini, was held for the first time in Pietrasanta in April 2007. It took place a second time in October and November 2014 in Livorno, moderated by Antonio Tentori. Among the guests was D'Amato's son Daniele Massaccesi, who said that it had been above all the passion for cinema – to never stop making films at any costs – that D'Amato had wanted to pass on to the younger generation of filmmakers.

The "Hofbauer Kongress", which takes place at least once every year since 2010 at the Komm Kino in Nuremberg, Germany, has repeatedly screened D'Amato's films mostly from 35 mm prints, with the 15th and 16th editions of the festival being especially devoted to the filmmaker.

On 1–3 February 2019, honouring the 20th anniversary of D'Amato's death, the Filmarchiv Austria held a "Tribute to Joe D'Amato" at the Metro Kinokulturhaus in Vienna in which 10 films he directed were shown from original 35 mm prints.

=== Film tributes and dedications ===
In 1999, Andreas Schnaas shot a remake of, and homage to, D'Amato's Antropophagus entitled Anthropophagous 2000.

The Italian film Hyde's Secret Nightmare (2011, directed by Domiziano Cristopharo) is dedicated to D'Amato.

== Filmography ==
Year	Title	Worked as					Notes	Ref(s)
Year	Title	Director	Producer	Writer	Cinematographer	Other	Notes	Ref(s)
1951	È l'amor che mi rovina					Yes	Still photographer	
1951	L'inafferrabile 12					Yes	Still photographer	
1952	The Golden Coach					Yes	Still photographer	
1953	Madonna delle rose					Yes	Technician	
1961	Hercules in the Haunted World					Yes	Assistant cameraman	
1961	Gold of Rome					Yes	Assistant cameraman	
1962	Il mare					Yes	Assistant cameraman	
1963	Contempt					Yes	Assistant cameraman	
1963	Canzoni in bikini					Yes	Cameraman. Cinematographer: Franco Villa	
1964	Due mattacchioni al Moulin Rouge					Yes	Cameraman. Cinematographer: Franco Villa	
1964	Il mito (La violenza e l'amore)					Yes	Cameraman. Cinematographer: Franco Villa	
1964	Secret of the Sphinx					Yes	Cameraman. Cinematographer: Franco Villa	
1965	Soldati e caporali					Yes	Cameraman. Cinematographer: Franco Villa	
1966	Viaggio di nozze all'italiana (translation: Honeymoon Voyage)					Yes	Cameraman. Cinematographer: Emilio Foriscot	
1966	Lo scippo					Yes	Cameraman. Cinematographer: Franco Villa	
1966	For One Thousand Dollars Per Day					Yes	Cameraman. Cinematographer: Mario Pacheco	
1966	Trap for Seven Spies					Yes	Cameraman. Cinematographer: José F. Aguayo	
1966	È mezzanotte... butta giù il cadavere (translation: At Midnight, Throw Down the Corpse)					Yes	Cameraman. Cinematographer: Franco Villa	
1966	Thompson 1880					Yes	Cameraman. Cinematographer: Franco Villa	
1966	The Taming of the Shrew					Yes	Assistant Cameraman	
1966	Maigret a Pigalle					Yes	Cameraman. Cinematographer: Giuseppe Ruzzolini	
1966	Cinque della vendetta					Yes	Cameraman. Cinematographer: Víctor Monreal	
1966	Due once di piombo (Il mio nome è Pecos)					Yes	Cameraman. Cinematographer: Franco Villa	
1966	Master Stroke					Yes	Cameraman. Cinematographer: Francisco Sánchez	
1967	Red Blood, Yellow Gold					Yes	Cameraman. Cinematographer: Francisco Marin	
1967	Psychopath					Yes	Cameraman. Cinematographer: Franco Villa	
1967	Pecos Cleans Up					Yes	Cameraman. Cinematographer: Franco Villa	
1967	Your Turn to Die					Yes	Cameraman. Cinematographers: Franco Villa, Stelvio Massi	
1967	Straniero ... fatti il segno della croce!					Yes	Cameraman, assistant director, actor. Cinematographer: Franco Villa	
1967	Rose rosse per il führer					Yes	Cameraman. Cinematographer: Franco Villa	
1967	I'll Sell My Skin Dearly					Yes	Cameraman. Cinematographer: Stelvio Massi	
1967	Vietnam, guerra senza fronte				Yes	Yes	Second unit cameraman	
1968	Shoot Twice					Yes	Cameraman. Cinematographer: Francisco Marin	
1968	Seven Times Seven					Yes	Cameraman. Cinematography: Franco Villa	
1968	A Woman on Fire					Yes	Cameraman. Cinematographer: Franco Villa	
1968	Bury Them Deep					Yes	Cameraman. Cinematographer: Franco Villa	
1969	Una storia d'amore					Yes	Cameraman. Cinematographer: Guglielmo Mancori	
1969	Orgasmo					Yes	Cameraman. Cinematographer: Guglielmo Mancori	
1969	Passa Sartana ... è l'ombra della tua morte					Yes	Cameraman. Cinematographer: Franco Villa	
1969	A Noose for Django					Yes	Cameraman. Cinematographer: Franco Villa	
1969	Pelle di bandito				Yes		Director: Piero Livi	
1969	No Man's Island (L'isola delle svedesi, Twisted Girls)				Yes		Director: Silvio Amadio	
1970	Disperatamente l'estate scorsa				Yes		Director: Silvio Amadio	
1970	Inginocchiati straniero... I cadaveri non fanno ombra!				Yes		Director: Demofilo Fidani	
1970	Arrivano Django e Sartana... è la fine				Yes		Director: Demofilo Fidani	
1971	A Barrel Full of Dollars				Yes		Director: Demofilo Fidani	
1971	A Fistful of Death				Yes		Director: Demofilo Fidani	
1971	Vendetta at Dawn					Yes	Camera operator. Cinematographer: Guglielmo Mancori	
1971	Armiamoci e partite!				Yes		Director: Nando Cicero	
1972	Ben and Charlie				Yes		Director: Michele Lupo	
1972	What Have You Done to Solange?				Yes		Director: Massimo Dallamano	
1972	La gatta in calore				Yes		Director: Nello Rossati	
1972	Crime Boss				Yes		Director: Alberto De Martino	
1972	All'ultimo minuto (TV series, episodes Il rapido delle 13,30 and Dramma in alto mare)				Yes		Director: Ruggero Deodato	
1972	Le notti peccaminose di Pietro l'Aretino				Yes		Director: Manlio Scarpelli	
1972	The Killer Is on the Phone				Yes		Director: Alberto De Martino	
1972	Go Away! Trinity Has Arrived in Eldorado	?^{a}			Yes			
1972	Bounty hunter in Trinity	Yes^{f}		Yes	Yes			
1972	More Sexy Canterbury Tales	Yes^{g}		Yes	Yes			
1973	Fra' Tazio da Velletri	Yes^{h}					Directed a third of the film.	
1973	The Devil's Wedding Night	Yes			Yes		Only directed some scenes. Director: Luigi Batzella	
1973	Novelle licenziose di vergini vogliose	Yes		Yes	Yes	Yes	Editor	
1973	Counselor at Crime				Yes		Director: Alberto De Martino	
1973	Mean Frank and Crazy Tony				Yes		Cinematography with Aldo Tonti. Director: Michele Lupo	
1973	Death Smiles on a Murderer	Yes		Yes	Yes	Yes	Camera operator, story author	
1973	Pugni, pirati e karaté	Yes		Yes	Yes			
1974	Brigitte, Laura, Ursula, Monica, Raquel, Liz, Maria, Florinda, Barbara, Claudia e Sofia, le chiamo tutte... anima mia				Yes		Director: Mauro O. Ivaldi	
1974	Heroes in Hell	Yes		Yes	Yes			
1974	The Arena				Yes	Yes	2nd unit director. Director: Steve Carver	
1974	Diary of a Roman Virgin	Yes		Yes	Yes			
1974	Professore venga accompagnato dai suoi genitori				Yes		Director: Mino Guerrini	
1974	Il colonnello Buttiglione diventa generale				Yes		Director: Mino Guerrini	
1974	The Antichrist				Yes		Director: Alberto De Martino	
1974	Challenge to White Fang				Yes		Director: Lucio Fulci	
1975	Cormack of the Mounties (aka Red Coats)	Yes		Yes	Yes			
1975	Cassiodoro il più duro del Pretorio			Yes			Director: Oreste Coltellacci	
1975	Scandal in the Family				Yes		Director: Bruno Gaburro	
1975	Buttiglione diventa capo del servizio segreto				Yes		Director: Mino Guerrini	
1975	Emanuelle's Revenge	Yes	Yes	Yes	Yes			
1976	Strange Shadows in an Empty Room				Yes		Director: Alberto De Martino	
1976	Voto di castità	Yes			Yes			
1976	Black Cobra Woman	Yes		Yes	Yes			
1976	Emanuelle in Bangkok	Yes			Yes			
1976	Emanuelle in America	Yes			Yes			
1977	Emanuelle Around the World	Yes			Yes			
1977	Emanuelle and the Last Cannibals	Yes		Yes	Yes			
1977	Ladies' Doctor	Yes			Yes	Yes	Story	
1977	Mondo erotico	Yes^{i}						
1978	Emanuelle and the White Slave Trade	Yes		Yes	Yes			
1978	The Pleasure Shop on 7th Avenue	Yes		Yes				
1978	Sexy Night Report n. 2	Yes			Yes			
1978	Follie di notte	Yes		Yes	Yes			
1978	Papaya, Love Goddess of the Cannibals	Yes			Yes			
1978	Tough to Kill	Yes			Yes			
1979	Images in a Convent	Yes			Yes			
1979	Beyond the Darkness (Buio Omega)	Yes			Yes			
1980	Sesso nero	Yes	Yes					
1980	Erotic Nights of the Living Dead	Yes						
1980	Porno exotic love	Yes			Yes			
1980	Antropophagus	Yes	Yes	?^{j}				
1980	Blue erotic climax		Yes	Yes	Yes		Director: Claudio Bernabei	
1980	Porno Holocaust	Yes			Yes			
1980	Super climax	Yes	Yes	Yes	Yes			
1980	Hard sensation	Yes			Yes			
1981	Paradiso blu	Yes			Yes			
1981	Orgasmo nero	Yes		Yes	Yes			
1981	Labbra bagnate	Yes	Yes		Yes			
1981	Le ereditiere super porno	Yes	Yes		Yes			
1981	Porno video		Yes		Yes		Director: Giuliana Gamba	
1981	Bocca golosa	Yes	Yes		Yes			
1981	La voglia	Yes	Yes		Yes			
1981	Labbra vogliose		Yes	Yes	Yes		Director: Claudio Bernabei	
1981	Sesso acerbo	Yes	Yes		Yes			
1981	Voglia di sesso	Yes	Yes		Yes			
1981	Le porno investigatrici		Yes				Director: Claudio Bernabei	
1981	Caldo profumo di vergine	Yes	Yes		Yes			
1981	L'ogre de barbarie				Yes		Director: Pierre Matteuzzi	
1981	Absurd	Yes	Yes				Co-produced with Eduard Sarlui	
1982	Stretta e bagnata	Yes	Yes		Yes			
1982	Il succo del sesso	Yes						
1982	Super hard love	Yes	Yes		Yes			
1982	Il mondo perverso di Beatrice	Yes	Yes		Yes			
1982	Ator, the Fighting Eagle	Yes	Yes		Yes			
1982	Ator 2 – L'invincibile Orion (aka Blade Master)	Yes	Yes	Yes	Yes			
1982	Caligula... The Untold Story	Yes	Yes		Yes			
1983	Una vergine per l'impero romano	Yes	Yes		Yes			
1983	Messalina orgasmo imperiale	Yes	Yes		Yes	Yes	Actor	
1983	2020 Texas Gladiators	Yes	Yes		Yes		Co-directed with George Eastman	
1983	Endgame	Yes	Yes	Yes	Yes	Yes	Editor	
1983	Cuando calienta el sol... vamos alla playa		Yes		Yes		Director: Mino Guerrini	
1984	Jojami	^{k}	Yes					
1984	Nido d'amore	^{k}	Yes					
1984	Wendee / Wendee, la chiave del piacere	^{k}	Yes	?^{l}				
1984	La chiave del piacere	^{k}	Yes	?^{l}				
1984	Swoosie	^{k}	Yes					
1984	Pin Pon	^{k}	Yes					
1984	Fashion love	^{k}	Yes					
1984	Sesso allo specchio	^{k}	Yes					
1985	Le due bocche ... di Marina	^{k}	Yes					
1985	Le due ... grandi labbra / La voglia di Marina	^{k}	Yes					
1985	The Alcove	Yes	Yes		Yes			
1985	The Pleasure	Yes	Yes		Yes			
1985	A Lustful Mind	Yes	Yes		Yes	Yes	Editor	
1986	Midnight Gigolo	Yes	Yes	Yes	Yes	Yes	Editor	
1986	Convent of Sinners	Yes	Yes		Yes	Yes	Editor	
1986	Delizia	Yes	Yes		Yes	Yes	Editor	
1987	Warrior Queen		Yes		Yes		Associate producer	
1987	Stage Fright		Yes				Director: Michele Soavi	
1987	Interzone		Yes				Director: Deran Sarafian	
1987	Killing Birds	Yes	Yes		Yes		Co-directed with Claudio Lattanzi	
1987	Eleven Days, Eleven Nights	Yes	Yes		Yes			
1988	Top Model	Yes	Yes					
1988	Ghosthouse (aka La Casa 3)		Yes				Director: Umberto Lenzi	
1988	Witchery (aka La Casa 4)		Yes				Director: Fabrizio Laurenti	
1989	Dirty Love	Yes	Yes		Yes			
1989	Blue Angel Cafe	Yes	Yes		Yes			
1989	Hitcher In The Dark		Yes				Director: Umberto Lenzi	
1989	Metamorphosis (aka DNA Formula Lethal)		Yes				Director: George Eastman	
1990	Quest for the Mighty Sword	Yes	Yes	Yes	Yes		The 4th "Ator" film (aka The Hobgoblin)	
1990	Body Moves / Hot Steps (Passi caldi)		Yes				Director: Gerry Lively	
1990	Deep Blood	Yes	Yes		Yes			
1990	La Casa 5: Beyond Darkness		Yes				Director: Claudio Fragasso	
1990	Troll 2	^{b}^{c}	Yes				Director: Claudio Fragasso	
1990	Contamination .7 (aka Troll 3)	Yes^{c}^{d}	Yes		Yes		Main director: Fabrizio Laurenti	
1991	Eleven Days, Eleven Nights 2	Yes	Yes	Yes	Yes			
1991	La stanza delle parole		Yes				Director: Franco Molè	
1991	Door to Silence		Yes				Director: Lucio Fulci	
1991	Dark Tale / Favola crudele		Yes				Director: Roberto Leoni	
1991	Return from Death (Frankenstein 2000)	Yes	Yes					
1991	A Woman's Secret	Yes	Yes		Yes			
1992	Lezioni di sesso. 1.: Il vizio infinito. 2.: Donne di piacere. 3.: Così fan tutti. 4.: Dio mio como sono caduta in basso.		Yes					
1992	Sul filo del rasoio / Instinct	Yes	Yes					
1992	Una tenera storia	Yes	Yes					
1993	Chinese Kamasutra	Yes	Yes		Yes			
1993	I racconti della camera rossa	Yes	Yes					
1993	The Labyrinth of Love	Yes	Yes		Yes			
1993	The House of Pleasure	Yes	Yes					
1993	China and Sex	Yes	Yes					
1993	L'Atelier di Rosa	Yes						
1993	Roxana – Fra le gambe di Luana	Yes						
1993	Francesca – Goduria anale	Yes						
1993	Incontri anale nell'autosalone	Yes						
1993	Tre porcone sul biliardo	Yes						
1994	Le avventure erotiche di Aladino	Yes					Co-directed with Luca Damiano	
1994	L'alcova dei piaceri proibiti	Yes					Co-directed with Luca Damiano	
1994	Amleto – Per amore di Ophelia	Yes					Co-directed with Luca Damiano	
1994	Le mille e una notte	Yes					Co-directed with Luca Damiano	
1994	Il barone von Masoch	Yes					Co-directed with Luca Damiano	
1994	Il colpo dell'an(n)o	Yes						
1994	Il marchese De Sade	Yes					Co-directed with Luca Damiano	
1994	Decamerone X	Yes					Co-directed with Luca Damiano	
1994	Decamerone X 2	Yes					Co-directed with Luca Damiano	
1994	Fantasmi al castello	Yes					Co-directed with Luca Damiano	
1994	Ladri e gentiluomini – Donne, gioielli e culi belli	Yes					Co-directed with Luca Damiano	
1994	La sexy caccia al tesoro	Yes					Co-directed with Luca Damiano	
1994	Marco Polo la storia mai raccontata	Yes			Yes	Yes	Co-directed with Luca Damiano	
1994	Spiando Simona	Yes					Co-directed with Luca Damiano	
1994	Il marito guardone – Sesso spiato	Yes					Co-directed with Luca Damiano	
1994	Tarzan X	Yes	Yes	Yes	Yes			
1994	Tarzan 2 – il ritorno del figlio della jungla	Yes						
1994	Anal Paprika	Yes						
1995	Fuga di mezzanotte aka Fuga all'alba	Yes						
1995	Homo Erectus	Yes						
1995	Le intoccabili	Yes						
1995	Adolescenza	Yes						
1995	Amadeus Mozart	Yes						
1995	Giulietta e Romeo	Yes						
1995	Le bambole del Führer	Yes						
1995	Le 120 giornate di Sodoma	Yes						
1995	Malizia italiana	Yes						
1995	Il monaco	Yes						
1995	Passione travolgente a Venezia	Yes					Co-directed with Cameron Grant	
1995	Penitenziario femminile	Yes						
1995	Le perversioni di Scarface	Yes						
1995	Robin Hood – La leggenda sexy	Yes						
1995	Saloon Kiss	Yes						
1995	Il siciliano (Don Salvatore)	Yes						
1995	Provocation (Vizio e provocazione)	Yes						
1995	Sogni di una ragazza di campagna	Yes						
1995	Black Cops...in Budapest	Yes						
1995	Wild East	Yes						
1995	Carmen	Yes						
1995	Scandalo al sole	Yes					Co-directed with Luca Damiano	
1996	Antonio e Cleopatra	Yes						
1996	Danno anale	Yes						
1996	Flamenco extasy	Yes						
1996	Kamasutra	Yes						
1996	Istinto fatale	Yes						
1996	Messalina	Yes						
1996	Proposta anale indecente	Yes						
1996	Rudy / Valentino's Story	Yes						
1996	Scambio di coppie	Yes						
1996	Il danno	Yes						
1996	Torero	Yes						
1996	Lulù	Yes					Co-directed with Luca Damiano	
1996	Gipsy Seduction	Yes					Co-directed with Luca Damiano	
1996	Aphrodite	Yes						
1996	Caligula / Caligola follia del potere	Yes						
1996	Nerone	Yes						
1996	Lolita – Adolescenza perversa	Yes						
1996	Selvaggia	Yes						
1996	Lo stallone italiano	Yes						
1996	Lo stallone italiano 2	Yes						
1996	Rocco last fight	Yes						
1996	Othello	Yes						
1996	Striptease – Ragazze Facili	Yes						
1996	Il diario proibito delle due principesse	Yes						
1996	Tutte le donne del presidente	Yes						
1996	Donna Flor e i suoi tre mariti	Yes						
1997	Top Girl	^{e}	Yes		Yes			
1997	The Hyena	Yes			Yes			
1997	Police Department	Yes						
1997	Police Department 2	Yes						
1997	Hercules / Le fatiche erotiche di Ercole	Yes						
1997	Amore e psiche	Yes						
1997	Olympus	Yes						
1997	Sodoma e Gomorra	Yes						
1997	Ulysses	Yes						
1997	Experiences 1	Yes						
1997	Experiences 2	Yes						
1997	La regina degli elefanti	Yes						
1997	Il vizio del peccato	Yes						
1997	Peccati di gola	Yes						
1997	Capriccio anale	Yes						
1997	I magnifici sette	Yes						
1997	Calamity Jane	Yes						
1997	Calamity Jane 2	Yes						
1997	Lussuria	Yes						
1997	Praga amore mio	Yes						
1997	Il laureato	Yes						
1997	La figlia del padrino	Yes						
1997	Desiderio eterno	Yes						
1997	Sahara	Yes						
1997	Ercole e Sansone nella terra delle Amazzoni	Yes					aka Samson in the Amazon's Land	
1997	La venexiana	Yes						
1997	Dolce seduzione	Yes						
1998	Anita e la maschera di ferro	Yes						
1998	Selen nell'isola del tesoro	Yes						
1998	Harem 2000	Yes						
1998	Off limits	Yes						
1998	Blow – Up	Yes						
1998	Elixir	Yes						
1998	Goya – La maya desnuda	Yes						
1998	Raiders / I predatori della verginità perduta	Yes						
1998	Thief of Love / Ladro d'amore - Giacomo Casanova	Yes						
1998	Il fantasma	Yes						
1998	Sexy Pirates	Yes						
1999	Showgirl	Yes						
1999	Sono positivo					Yes	Cameo appearance as "the director of porn films"	

== Notes ==
- ^{a} Both D'Amato and Diego Spataro, who used the alias "Dick Spitfire", stated that D'Amato directed this film.
- ^{b} The credited director of Troll 2 was Claudio Fragasso under the pseudonym "Drake Floyd".
- ^{c} In his book on Italian horror directors, Louis Paul makes the unsourced statement that D'Amato "ended up finishing [Troll 2 and Troll 3] as director in an attempt to save the productions that even he deemed poorly filmed and unreleasable". Regarding Troll 3, Lupi also states that D'Amato directed a part of it. For Troll 2, Paul seems to be the only source for D'Amato's directorial involvement.
- ^{d} The film's main director was Fabrizio Laurenti under the pseudonym "Martin Newlin".
- ^{e} The directorial credit of Top Girl varies. In Italian prints, it is credited to "Andrea Massai"; abroad, the credits read "Joe D'Amato".
- ^{f} The credits of Bounty Killer in Trinity list Oscar Santaniello as director under his pseudonym "Oskar Faradine". According to D'Amato himself, he directed the film, but let production manager Santaniello take the credit. Bruckner lists Santaniello as producer and D'Amato as director, and Curti, too, states that the film was "directed by Massaccesi but signed by Santaniello – one of several unsigned directing jobs Massaccesi took on before his official first feature". Lupi, however, considers the movie to be of inferior quality and hence believes that Santaniello was truly the director whereas D'Amato, in his eyes, was only involved as cinematographer and writer.
- ^{g} More Sexy Canterbury Tales was directed by D'Amato, but the directorial credit went to assistant director Romano Scandariato under his pseudonym "Romano Gastaldi"; the English film credits "Ralph Zucker" as the director.
- ^{h} According to an interview given to the Italian magazine Nocturno by Romano Scandariato, who took the directorial credit under his pseudonym "Romano Gastaldi", D'Amato directed about one third of Fra' Tazio da Velletri before leaving production due to differences with the producers; Scandariato then finished directing the remaining two thirds.
- ^{i} As director of Mondo Erotico, only Bruno Mattei was credited; the pseudonym "Jimmy Matheus" was used. D'Amato directed the scenes with Laura Gemser that tie the vignettes together; he remained uncredited.
- ^{j} Both Enrico Biribicchi, who got the credit, and D'Amato claimed that they had acted as cinematographers on set.
- ^{k} These 10 films, the so-called "Lucky Faar Delly" series (shot from April 1984 to February 1985), were all produced by D'Amato through his M.A.D. production company, were all directed by Luca Damiano, and all starred Marina Hedman. D'Amato occasionally contributed to the series as co-director, although the extent to which he did remains unclear. In Sesso allo specchio, film critic R. D'Amato observes the use of a hand-held camera, which is otherwise not present in the Faar Delly series, as sign of D'Amato's possible involvement.
- ^{l} Smith lists La chiave del piacere as an alternate title to Wendee, la chiave del piacere and states that "according to some sources Massaccesi is the screenwriter".
