= Deep Blood =

- Directed by: Joe D'Amato (uncredited); Raffaele Donato
- Written by: George Nelson Ott
- Produced by: Filmirage; Variety Film
- Starring: Frank Baroni; Allen Cort; Keith Kelsch; James Camp
- Cinematography: Joe D'Amato (as Federiko Slonisko)
- Edited by: Kathleen Stratton
- Music by: Carlo Maria Cordio
- Distributed by: Variety Distribution
- Release date: 1989
- Running time: 90 minutes
- Country: Italy
- Language: English

Deep Blood, also known as Sharks and Sangue negli abissi (literally: "Blood in the Abyss"), is a 1989 Italian sharksploitation drama.

The credited director Raffaele Donato (as Raf Donato) only directed the first scene in which the boys gather to seal their blood pact, while the remainder of the film was directed and photographed by Joe D'Amato, who also co-produced the film through his company Filmirage in conjunction with Variety Film.

== Synopsis ==
On a deserted beach, four boys, Miki, John, Ben and Allan, are told by an Indian the story of the monstrous marine being Wakan and seal a blood pact, a bond of their friendship and mutual assistance in case of danger.

Ten years later, the boys reunite as young men and decide to go on a holiday together. But a killer shark ruins their plans. It attacks the beach community and kills John while he is swimming.

The three remaining friends decide to avenge John's death and hunt the beast. Their task will not be easy, since a legend says that the beast is an incarnation of an ancient hoodoo spirit that has taken the form of a killer shark. The boys set an underwater trap for the shark and lure it into an area in which they have planted powerful explosives, thereby successfully killing the beast.

== Production ==
Joe D'Amato met Raffaele Donato in 1975 on the set of Red Coats and used him repeatedly as an English dialogue coach. He encountered him again years later in the United States and hired him on Deep Blood because he needed someone who was fluent in English. In an interview D'Amato gave for the 1996 book Spaghetti Nightmares, D'Amato stated that Donato had told him that he wanted to direct a film, but after directing the first scene of the film at the beach, Donato realized that directing films was not what he wanted to do. D'Amato then finished the film on his own.

D'Amato said "(It was shot) in Florida mostly, though we did do a small part along the Mississippi River. (...) The actual underwater scenes though were shot in various places: at Ventotene, in a Roman swimming pool and in a New Orleans aquarium. We built a mechanical shark's head, and for the rest we used stock footage shots." The shark stock footage was bought from the National Geographic Society. In the scene of the explosion killing the shark, footage from Great White is used.

For a time, the film carried the working title Wakan. It was announced as Sharks (The Challenge) directed by "David Hills" (one of D'Amato's pseudonyms), but D'Amato stated that he finally decided to credit Rafaelle Donato for directing it, since he himself had already shot many films during that year and wanted to avoid it becoming apparent that he was doing everything himself.

== Cast ==
- Frank Baroni as Miki
- Allen Cort as Allan
- Keith Kelsch as Ben
- James Camp as Jason
- Tody Bernard as the sheriff
- John K. Brune as John
- Margareth Hanks as Elisabeth
- Van Jensens
- Don Perrin
- Claude File
- Charles Brill
- Mitzi McCall as Keith Kelsh
- Mike Peavey
- Brian Ricci
- John Mason
- Robert La Brosse (uncredited)

== Release ==
The tagline on the cover of a VHS release titled Sharks reads, "Where sharks prey, the ocean is a bloodbath."

In Italy, a VHS release was made by Avo Film.

In Germany, the film was released by "VPS" on VHS titled Shakka - Bestie der Tiefe (literally: "Shakka - Beast of the Depths").

In the Czech Republic, the film was released on DVD by "Řitka video" in 2009, under the title Bestie z hlubin. The DVD contains the Czech dub and the English original version with forced Czech subtitles.

In 2021, it was released on DVD and Blu-ray in the US by Severin Films.

== Reception ==
The film was very successful abroad, and even sold well in Japan.

In 1999, Italian film critic Marco Giusti called the film a Z movie version of Jaws. He thought that the dialogue scenes were slightly ridiculous, but that "the small film was likable".

== See also ==
- List of killer shark films

== Bibliography ==
- Giusti, Marco (1999). dizionario dei film italiani STRACULT [sic]. Cles: Sterling & Kupfer. ISBN 88-200-2919-7.
- Gomarasca, Manlio; Pulice, Davide (2009). "Joe D'Amato. Guida al cinema estremo e dell'orrore". Nocturno. 78 (January) (Dossier).
- Palmerini, Luca M.; Mistretta, Gaetano (1996). Spaghetti Nightmares: Italian Fantasy-horrors as Seen Through the Eyes of Their Protagonists. Fantasma Books. ISBN 9780963498274.
