= Tough to Kill =

- Directed by: Joe D'Amato
- Written by: Sergio Donati; Giuseppe Zaccariello
- Starring: Luc Merenda; Donald O'Brien
- Cinematography: Joe D'Amato
- Music by: Stelvio Cipriani
- Release date: 1978
- Language: Italian

Tough to Kill (Italian: Duri a morire) is a 1978 Italian action film shot in the Dominican Republic written and directed by Joe D'Amato and starring Luc Merenda and Donald O'Brien.

== Plot ==
A hit man joins a band of mercenaries for a mission in an African jungle during a civil war. His goal is to bring back a wanted mercenary dead or alive, for whom a huge reward has been offered. The members of the squad all wind up fighting with each other over the prize.

== Cast ==
- Luc Merenda as Martin
- Donald O'Brien as Major Hagerty
- Percy Hogan as Wabu
- Laurence Stark as Mike O’Sullivan
- Piero Vida as Leon
- Wolfango Soldati as Polansky
- Isarco Ravaioli as Cpt. Duscheff/Duchesne
- Alessandro Haber as Papadinos
- Lorenza Rodriguez Lopez as Stella

== Release ==
The film soundtrack by Stelvio Cipriani was released on CD by Digitsoundtracks on 7 February 2019.

== Reception ==
Director Joe D'Amato stated about the film in an interview, "The script was excellent, but due to some production mishaps, the resulting film was pretty average."
