= Piero Vida =

Italian actor (1938–1987)

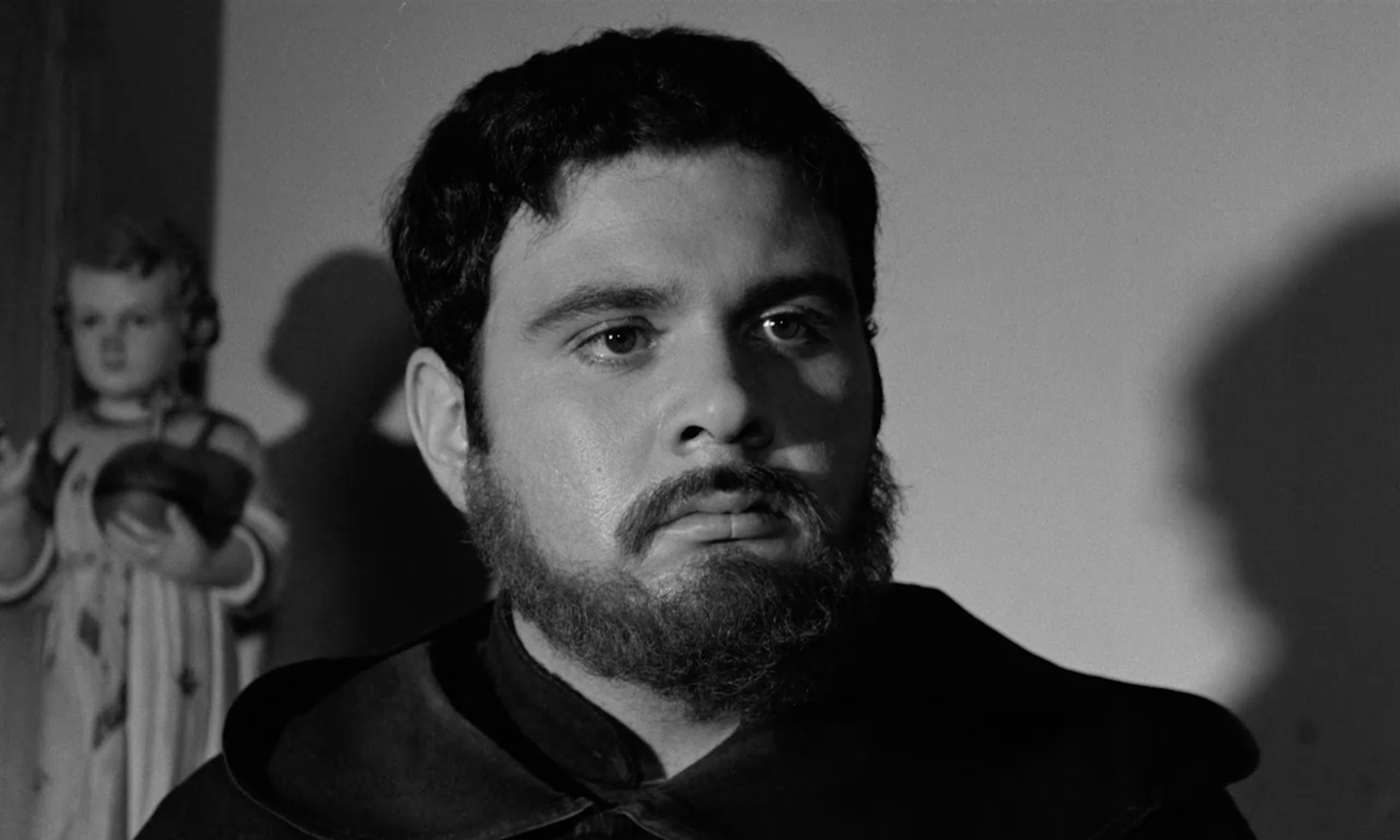
- Vida in Katarsis (1963)
- Born: 5 August 1938; Venice, Italy
- Died: 25 January 1987 (aged 48); Rome, Italy
- Occupation: Actor
- Years active: 1959–1987

Piero Vida (5 August 1938 – 25 January 1987) was an Italian film actor. He appeared in 52 films between 1959 and 1987. He was born in Venice, Italy and died in Rome, Italy.

== Partial filmography ==
- Il raccomandato di ferro (1959)
- Katarsis (1963) - Padre Peo Remigio
- Chi lavora è perduto (1963) - Gianni - L'amico di Bonifacio
- Slalom (1965) - The Murderer
- La donnaccia (1965)
- Una questione privata (1966)
- Pecos Cleans Up (1967) - Paco
- Renegade Riders (1967) - Levasseur
- Hate for Hate (1967) - Sorito
- John the Bastard (1967) - Sacerdote
- Execution (1968) - Burd
- Trusting Is Good... Shooting Is Better (1968) - The Portuguese
- Galileo (1968) - Pope Urban VIII
- Il sole è di tutti (1968)
- Catch as Catch Can (1968)
- Sai cosa faceva Stalin alle donne? (1969) - Director
- Sierra Maestra (1969)
- Capricci (1969, by Carmelo Bene) - Policeman
- Nel nome del padre (1971) - Bestia
- Short Night of Glass Dolls (1971) - Kommissar Kierkoff
- Il sindacalista (1972) - Vezio Bellinelli
- Who Saw Her Die? (1972) - Journalist Cuman
- Le notti peccaminose di Pietro l'Aretino (1972) - Cuor Contento
- Beati i ricchi (1972) - Prete
- Salome (1972) - Narraboth
- Testa in giù, gambe in aria (1972)
- Fiorina la vacca (1972) - Nane 'ruffiano'
- Non ho tempo (1973)
- Sentivano uno strano, eccitante, pericoloso puzzo di dollari (1973) - Bronco Kid
- Giordano Bruno (1973)
- Furto di sera bel colpo si spera (1973)
- Patroclooo!... e il soldato Camillone, grande grosso e frescone (1973) - Ottavio
- Buona parte di Paolina (1973)
- The Night Porter (1974) - Day Porter
- Anno uno (1974) - Clienti al caffè
- E cominciò il viaggio nella vertigine (1974) - Prof. Nikeli Vaks
- Deep Red (1975) - Fat cop
- Léonor (1975)
- A Genius, Two Partners and a Dupe (1975) - Jacky Roll
- Victory March (1976)
- Giovannino (1976)
- 1900 (1976)
- Disubbidire è peccato (1976)
- Tough to Kill (1979)
- Il ritorno di Casanova (1980)
- The Lady of the Camellias (1981)
- Grog (1982)
- Cicciabomba (1982) - Don Lillo
- Nostalghia (1983)
- Il cavaliere, la morte e il diavolo (1983)
- Les amants terribles (1985) - Patron De La Trattoria
- Massimamente folle (1985)
- La vita di scorta (1986)
- The Professor (1986) - Mimmo Mesillo
- The Moro Affair (1986) - Secretary of the PSI
- Stage Fright (1987) - Ferrari
- Man on Fire (1987) - Kidnapper
