= The Pleasure =

Italian erotic film by Joe D'Amato

- Italian theatrical release poster
- Directed by: Joe D'Amato
- Screenplay by: Franco Valobra; Claudio Fragasso
- Story by: Franco Valobra; Claudio Fragasso
- Cinematography: Joe D'Amato
- Edited by: Franco Alessandri
- Music by: Cluster
- Production company: Filmirage
- Release date: 1985
- Running time: 94 minutes
- Country: Italy

The Pleasure (Italian: Il piacere) is an Italian erotic drama film directed by Joe D'Amato.

== Plot ==
Italy in the early 1930s. Gerard, an aristocrat, is in mourning over the death of his mistress Leonora. He listens to tape recordings of them having sex and records his recollections of the day he met Leonora for the first time at the carnival of Venice many years ago, on a day he felt sexually adventurous. In a flashback, we see him meet her on the streets and introducing himself as Giacomo Casanova. After chasing her through the city, he finds her waiting for him behind a column in a passageway, where he lifts her dress and has sex with her. Later that day in an opium den, after having a smoke, they are initiated by Haunani into the cosmic secrets of pleasure and join in a threesome with her.

Back in the present, Gerard and Fiorella dress Leonora's naked body for her funeral. When Ursula and Edmund, Leonora's children from another man, arrive for the funeral, Gerard, who has not seen either of them for ten years, at first mistakes Ursula for Leonora. Gerard is now legal guardian to both until they come of age. In a sudden fit, Edmund cries out that his mother was only a whore and suffers an epileptic attack. He is calmed down by his sister breastfeeding him like their mother did. Later, it is Fiorella who repeatedly breastfeeds him and with whom he has his first sex.

Ursula eavesdrops on Gerard listening to his recordings of her mother's voice during sex. Later, she dresses exactly like her mother used to and dances with both Edmund and then Gerard, to whom she cites her mother's words from the recording, outraging him. At night, while Gerard is asleep, Ursula enters his room and listens to the tapes herself. She decides she wants to lose her virginity to him and makes the offer directly by feigning her mother wanted him to do so. Gerard, however, is unwilling to comply, which encourages Ursula to start acting like her mother. At the movies with Gerard, she fondles a stranger next to her. Going for a ride with Gerard, she incites the well endowed stable master Boris to have sex with her when Gerard interrupts them and whips him away. Finally, she visits a brothel run by Rosa, a friend of Leonora's. She starts to work there, planning to give away her virginity in order to take revenge on Gerard for not doing so himself. However, her customers are such that it never happens.

One night, Ursula and Edmund disappear, Ursula having vandalised Gerard's mementos of Leonora and rerecorded the tapes with her own voice. Gerard, upset, has sex with Fiorella on the couch. They then go to the police to initiate a search but are not given proper attention because Gerard's father was a well-known anti-fascist. Later, Gerard and Fiorella visit the opium den to get help, where after a smoke they have a threesome with Haunani.

At Rosa's, Ursula's virginity is auctioned off to the highest bidder. In the meantime, Haunani helps Gerard track down Ursula at Rosa's. When he tries get the police to intervene due to Ursula and Edmund still being underage, they refuse. They admit they have already known about Ursula and the auction for a few days, claiming that all of Venice has heard of it. However, the highest bidder is the commander of the Venetian fascist militia. Gerard and Fiorella therefore visit Rosa by themselves and Gerard pays Rosa more than the highest bidder in order to save Ursula's virginity. When Ursula consequently offers her virginity to him again, he refuses, but by threatening to deflower herself with a candle, she finally convinces Gerard to have sex with her.

Gerard and Ursula later walk towards the passageway where Leonora and he first had sex. She walks ahead, and when he follows, she waits for him behind a column to offer herself by lifting her dress, addressing him as Casanova.

== Cast ==
- Andrea Guzon as Leonora / Ursula
- Gabriele Tinti as Gerard Villeneuve
- Marco Mattioli as Edmund
- Lilli Carati as Fiorella
- Laura Gemser as Haunani
- Dagmar Lassander as Rosa
- Maurice Poli as Boris the stableman (uncredited)
- Domiziano Arcangeli (uncredited)

== Release ==
The film passed Italian censorship on 12 June 1985.

It grossed over 3 million Italian lira on its release.

== Reception ==
In 1986, Kim Newman (Monthly Film Bulletin) described the film as an "ill-advised imitation of Tinto Brass' already soporific and offensive La Chiave (The Key)" Newman noted that D'Amato's cinematography was "more careful than usual even attempting some genuine artiness" but that his "porno style hasn't changed since the days when he would churn out ten Em(m)anuelle films a year."
