= Black Cobra Woman =

- Directed by: Joe D'Amato
- Screenplay by: Joe D'Amato; G. Egle
- Produced by: Oscar Santaniello
- Starring: Laura Gemser; Jack Palance; Gabriele Tinti; Michele Starck
- Cinematography: Joe D'Amato
- Edited by: Bruno Mattei
- Music by: Piero Umiliani
- Production company: Airone
- Distributed by: Variety Distribution
- Release date: 1976
- Running time: 96 minutes
- Country: Italy

Black Cobra Woman (Italian: Eva nera, UK title: Erotic Eva) is a 1976 Italian exploitation movie written and directed by Joe D'Amato. The film starred Jack Palance and Laura Gemser.

== Plot ==
While travelling to Hong Kong, snake dancer Eva meets businessman Jules. The two hit it off, and after arriving to the city, Eva invites him to a performance she is going to give at a local nightclub. Jules, in turn, invites his older brother Judas to the show. The two men become smitten after seeing her performance, which involves Eva dancing topless with a snake. She is later revealed to be in a relationship with a violent, wealthy man whom she does not love. She even cheats on him with at least one other woman. Using his influence, Judas manages to get Eva's number and takes her out to lunch. He then shows her his home and his snake collection. He proposes her to live with him in his house and with his money. He assures her she does not have to do anything in exchange, not even sleep with him. Creeped out by his offer, Eva leaves.

However, after realizing she prefers a life of luxury over her current one, Eva changes her mind and moves in with the two brothers. Later that night, at a party, Eva is introduced to Judas' high society friends. More than one of them feels attracted to her. A young couple, Candy and her boyfriend, even offer to have a threesome with the dancer. Eva agrees to do it, but the group sex is interrupted by a very jealous Julius before it even begins. Later, Eva meets Gerri, a friend of Jules, and the two women start dating in secret. During those days, Eva introduces Gerri to several sites in Hong Kong, including a lesbian club. On returning from the club, Eva finds that Candy has been attacked by a black mamba snake from Judas' collection. This attack was secretly staged by Jules, who was envious of Eva's previous signs of attraction toward Candy.

Judas later announces he has to leave the city for business reasons. His brother Jules pretends to leave Hong Kong as well. Eva takes advantage of this opportunity to invite Gerri to Judas' home. Jules secretly watches the house and sees the couple have sex. After they fall asleep, he places the black mamba in their bedroom. Being more comfortable with snakes, Eva survives by remaining calm. Gerri, however, is bitten and dies. With no more women competing for Eva's attention, Jules invites her on a trip to the island where he was born. Realizing he is the one attacking her lovers, she pretends to be in love with him and accepts his invitation. At the island, Eva enlists two locals to dispatch Jules with another serpent. Judas loses his interest in her after finding out what has transpired. Eva does not mind, she picks the black mamba from its cage and starts dancing with it, knowing that the animal only kills when sensing fear. However, after remembering the role that snake took in Gerri's death, and all the violence that ensued, Eva's emotions get the better of her. The black mamba senses her fear and kills her.

== Cast ==
- Laura Gemser as Eva
- Jack Palance as Judas Carmichael
- Gabriele Tinti as Jules Carmichael
- Michele Starck as Gerri
- Ziggy Zanger as Candy (credited as Sigrid Zanger)
- Guido Mariotti (credited as G. Mariotti)

== Reception ==
In a contemporary review, the Monthly Film Bulletin described the film as "sex movie-cum-travelogue that settles for the usual dull romps. Its single unusual sequence is one which Eva and Jerry cook and eat a snake which has been skinned alive."

In retrospective reviews, AllMovie described the film as "unexpectedly high on style" noting cinematography that had the "glossiness worthy of an Emmanuelle film" but that the film was also "depressingly low on substance", noting the plot which "has a few surprises to offer (the villain's comeuppance must be seen to be believed) but the threadbare script fails to use its novel plot devices to their full potential and never builds interesting or believable characters." The review also noted D'Amato's direction, which was described as "lacklustre" and "never establishes a comfortable pace and pads the film with momentum-killing travelogue footage of Hong Kong."
