= Convent of Sinners =

1986 film by Joe D'Amato

- Italian theatrical release poster
- La monaca nel peccato
- Directed by: Joe D'Amato as Dario Donati
- Written by: René Rivet
- Based on: "La religeuse" di Denis Diderot
- Starring: Eva Grimaldi
- Cinematography: Joe D'Amato
- Edited by: Aristide Massaccesi
- Music by: Guido Anelli; Stefano Mainetti
- Production companies: Filmirage; D.M.V.
- Distributed by: D.M.V.
- Release date: 16 August 1986 (Italy)
- Running time: 88 minutes
- Country: Italy

Convent of Sinners (Italian: La monaca nel peccato, lit. 'The Sinful Nun'), is a 1986 Italian nunsploitation erotic film directed by Joe D'Amato (as Dario Donati). D'Amato directed, photographed and edited the film. The Rene Rivet screenplay was based on the novel "La Religeuse" by Denis Diderot.

== Plot ==
France, 1700. Young Susanna is raped by her stepfather. Her mother witnesses the crime and urges that Susanna be put into a convent, against her will. The monastery is a strange place since many nuns are oversexed. Some of them sometimes masturbate and flog themselves. The Mother Superior is sexually attracted to Susanna and makes advances. This arouses the jealousy of her former lover Sister Theresa, who starts scheming to regain her former position.

As the Mother Superior's tuberculosis grows stronger, Theresa takes temporary command of the monastery and abuses her power to make Susanna's life a living hell. Theresa spreads a rumor that Susanna is possessed by the Devil, and locks her in a rat-infested dungeon, then tricks the poor girl into drinking a substance that makes her feverish. She later orders some of the nuns to drag Susanna naked from her bed and whips her violently, claiming she is just trying to beat the Devil out of her.

The Monsignor hears word that one of the local nuns is demonically possessed and decides to investigate. He sends his personal exorcist to the convent, and Susanna is tied up and tortured and confined to a cell. At Theresa's behest, an exorcist even subjects Susanna to a douche by means of a vaginal syringe filled with holy water to clean the Devil from her body. When the Mother Superior dies, Susanna is accused of causing her death by witchcraft. Finally a trial is held in which Susanna is accused of being in league with Satan.

== Cast ==
- Eva Grimaldi as Susanna Simonin
- Karin Well as Sister Teresa
- Gabriele Gori as Handyman
- Jessica Moore as Sister Ursula
- Martin Philips as Don Morel
- Gabriele Tinti as Monsignore
- Maria Pia Parisi
- Katalin Murany
- Beba Balteano
- Aldina Martano

== See also ==
- List of Italian films of 1986
