= Novelle licenziose di vergini vogliose =

1973 film by Joe D'Amato

- Poster
- Directed by: Joe D'Amato (as Michael Wotruba); Franco Lo Cascio (uncredited)
- Screenplay by: Joe D'Amato; Diego Spataro
- Story by: Joe D'Amato; Diego Spataro
- Produced by: Diego Spataro; Massimo Bernardi
- Starring: Gabriella Giorgelli; Margaret Rose Keil; Enza Sbordone; Antonio Spaccatini
- Cinematography: Joe D'Amato
- Edited by: Joe D'Amato
- Music by: Franco Salina
- Production company: Elektra Film
- Release date: 1973
- Running time: 95 minutes
- Country: Italy
- Language: Italian

Italian: Novelle licenziose di vergini vogliose, lit. 'Licentious Tales of Lusty Virgins', is a 1973 Italian decamerotic comedy film lensed and directed for the most part by Joe D'Amato. The story and screenplay were written by D'Amato and producer Diego Spataro.

The film is noteworthy for involving Dante Alighieri, Giovanni Boccaccio and Francesco Petrarca - some of the most important people of Italian medieval and renaissance literature - as well as Geoffrey Chaucer in a plot which presents Boccaccio's dream descent into Dante's Inferno as a frame for a number of story vignettes dealing on the sinful lives of the damned he encounters on his way.

== Plot ==
Giovanni Boccaccio dreams of being led into hell, precisely into the department of "lechers". On his way, he learns the stories of some of the damned.

- Two married couples agree to switch partners and enjoy the other's spouse.
- A friar takes advantage of a young woman whose husband is insatiable.
- A merchant entrusts his household to one of his nephews, including his wife, who instructs the young man in the art of sex.
- A married merchant has a homosexual relationship with one of his workers; his wife threatens to tell everyone if her husband's lover will not satisfy her in bed.
- A husband entrusts his wife and daughter to a music teacher, underestimating him as shy and harmless.

On his way, Boccaccio also meets Nero and the majestic figure of Dante Alighieri.

== Cast ==
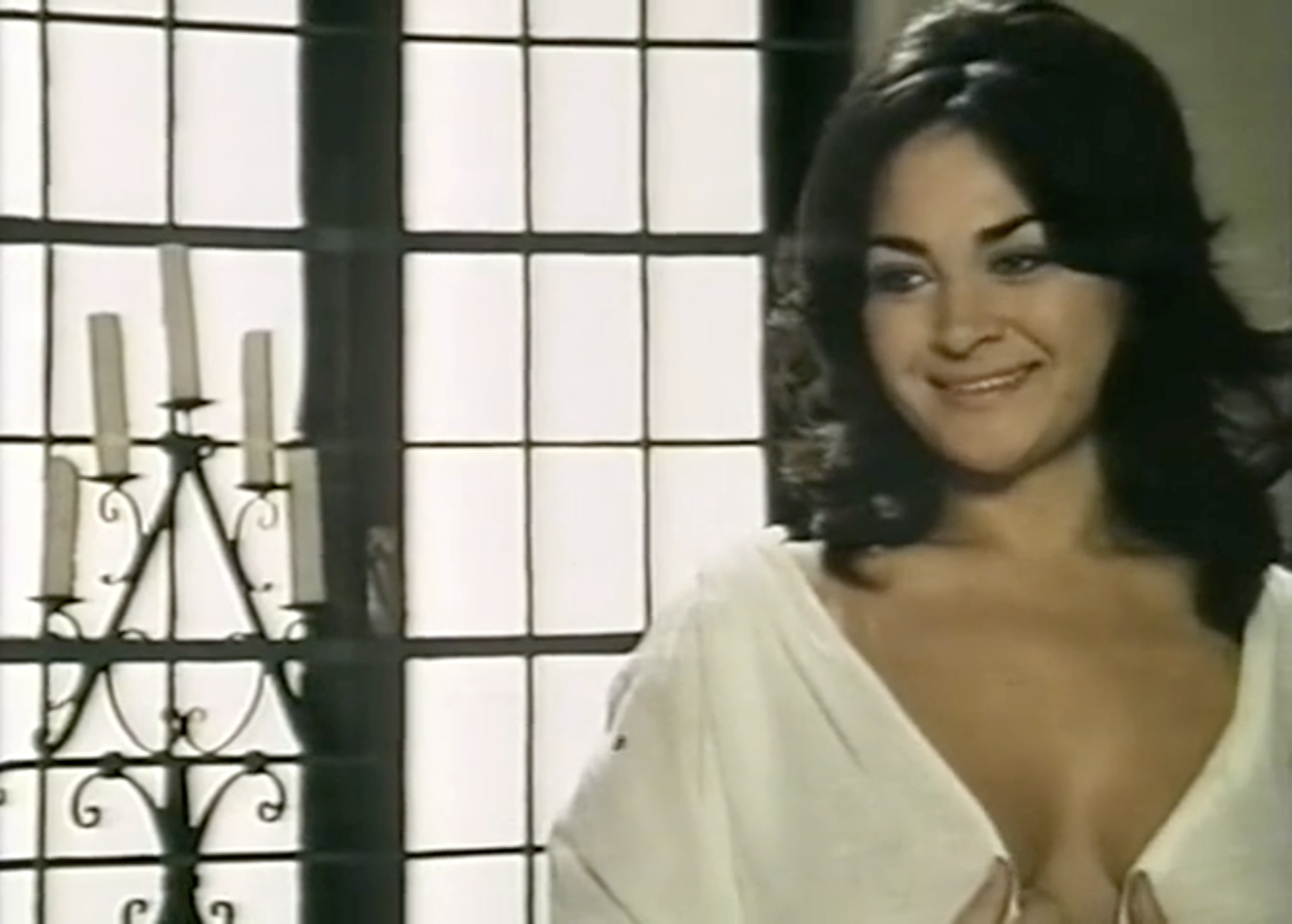
Giorgelli in a film scene

- Gabriella Giorgelli
- Margaret Rose Keil
- Enza Sbordone
- Antonio Spaccatini
- Paolo Casella
- Mimmo Poli
- Marco Mariani
- Evelyn Melcher
- Attilio Dottesio
- Tony Askin
- Stefano Oppedisano
- Enzo Pulcrano
- Fausto Di Bella
- Lucia Modugno

== Production and censorship ==
The first version of the film was entitled Italian: Le mille e una notte di Boccaccio a Canterbury, lit. 'The Thousand and One Tales of Boccaccio in Canterbury' - a title reflecting all three subject matters of Pier Paolo Pasolini's Trilogy of Life which consisted of Boccaccio's The Decameron (1971), Chaucer's The Canterbury Tales (1972) and Arabian Nights, an adaptation of One Thousand and One Nights released in 1974).

This first title, however, ended up being discarded when the film was rejected by the Italian board of censorship on November 15, 1972. According to the list deposited at the ministry when the film was resubmitted, several sequences were cut or shortenend, among them the shots in hell containing female frontal nudity and other sex and nude scenes as well a close-up of Brother Alessio in the barrel of excrements, while the first episode was completely reshot without nudity. Since the film's original director Joe D'Amato was at the time already working as cinematographer on Alberto de Martino's Counselor at Crime in the United States, the direction of the reshoot was given to Franco Lo Cascio. The film ended up being 106 metres, i.e. approximately 4 minutes, shorter. It passed when it was resubmitted under its current title on April 18, 1973.

== Release ==
The film was theatrically released in Italy. It was later distributed on VHS by Shendene & Moizzi in their "Collezzione decamerotico".

== Bibliography ==
- Curti, Roberto; Rocco, Alessio Di (2015). Visioni proibite: I film vietati dalla censura italiana (dal 1969 a oggi) (in Italian). Lindau. pp. 179–183. ISBN 9788867083800.
- Gayraud, Sébastien (2015). Joe D'Amato : le réalisateur fantôme (in French). Artus films. pp. 49–50. ISBN 978-2954843513.
- Giusti, Marco (1999). Dizionario dei film italiani stracult (in Italian). Sperling & Kupfer. pp. 514–515. ISBN 9788820029197.
- Lupi, Gordiano (2004). Erotismo, orrore e pornografia secondo Joe D'Amato (in Italian). Mondo Ignoto. pp. 35–38. ISBN 9788889084496.
