= Valentine Demy =

Italian mainstream and pornographic actress

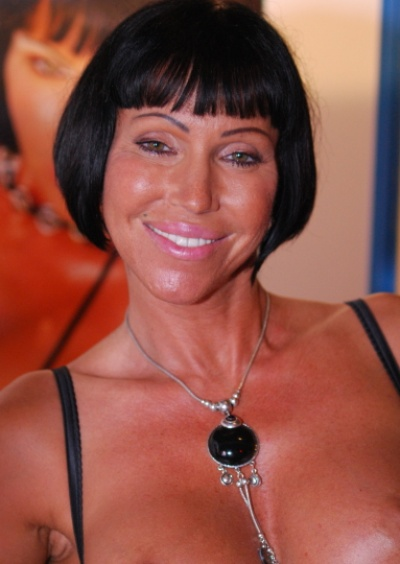
- Demy at the Erotica Tour in 2009
- Born: Marisa Parra; 24 January 1963 (age 62); Pisa, Italy
- Occupation: Pornographic actress
- Website: www.valentinedemy.it

Valentine Demy (born 24 January 1963) is an Italian mainstream and pornographic actress.

Born as Marisa Parra in Pisa, Demy started her film career in the late 1980s, appearing often in main roles in several genre films, mainly of erotic genre, in which she was directed among others by Tinto Brass and Joe D'Amato. In the mid-90s she switched to starring in pornographic films. She was a former body building champion.

Her stage name is inspired by the comic character with the same name created by Guido Crepax in 1965.
