= Quest for the Mighty Sword =

1990 film by Joe D'Amato

- British home video cover
- Directed by: Joe D'Amato
- Screenplay by: Joe D'Amato
- Produced by: Carlo Maria Cordio
- Starring: Eric Allan Kramer; Margaret Lenzey; Donald O'Brien; Dina Morrone
- Cinematography: Joe D'Amato
- Edited by: Kathleen Stratton
- Music by: Carlo Maria Cordio
- Production company: Filmirage
- Release date: 29 August 1990 (United States)
- Running time: 94 minutes (United States)
- Country: Italy

Quest for the Mighty Sword (also known as Ator III: The Hobgoblin, The Hobgoblin, or Troll 3) is a 1990 Italian fantasy adventure film directed by Joe D'Amato. It is the fourth and final film in the Ator film series.

== Plot ==
Thorn, King of the Gods, gave the Sword of the Sacred Graal to Ator, King of the Akili, to bring justice to his people and lead them back to their home in the Middle World. When Thorn comes to reclaim it, Ator refuses to give it back because he wants to pass it on to his little son Ator. Dejanira, an immortal, arrives in time to plead for Ator's life. Nonetheless, Thorn kills Ator, splitting the sword in two, and orders Dejanira to be imprisoned in a circle of fire until a human arrives who is strong enough to free her, at which point she will lose her immortality.

Young Ator's mother Sunn places him and the sword fragments in the care of the ugly sorcerer gnome Grindel and asks him for a death potion. Giving her a love potion instead, Grindel sleeps with her and curses her to lead a life of eternal poverty and prostitution until a man comes who embraces her like a mother.

Years later, when young Ator is about to turn 18, the soothsayer Nephele shows him a vision of Dejanira, with whom Ator falls in love, and tells him of his destiny. Ator finds the sword fragments hidden in Grindel's cave, forges them together and kills the gnome with it.

Following Nephele's instructions, Ator first travels to the Western Kingdom, where he enters a cave to defeat deadly robotic warrior twins and a fire-breathing dragon, after which he sacrifices the cave's treasure to the Gods. In another cave, he finds and frees Dejanira, which rouses Thorn's anger, who makes a volcano erupt and the cave collapse.

In a tavern, Ator meets his mother and, without recognising her, rescues her from an abusive client. When she recognises him and falls into his embrace, Grindel's curse is lifted and she immediately turns old in his arms and dies.

After burning her body, Ator continues his quest for his people and the Middle World by travelling through the Eastern Kingdom, where he and Dejanira confront the treachery of King Gunther and his sister Grimilde.

== Cast ==
- Eric Allan Kramer as Ator (credited as Eric Allen Kramer)
- Margaret Lenzey as Dejanira
- Donald O'Brien as Gunther (credited as Donal O'Brien)
- Dina Morrone as Sunn
- Chris Murphy as Skiold
- Laura Gemser as Grimilde
- Marisa Mell as Nephele
- Don Semeraro as Thorn / Grindel / Hagen

== Production ==
Actress Marisa Mell returned to the screen in this film after a five years absence. The film re-used some of the goblin masks from Troll 2.

The film bears similarities to Der Ring des Nibelungen. Ator is the equivalent of Siegfried, raised and abused by Mime (Grindel), who gets the magic sword Notung (The Sword of the Sacred Graal) and frees the sleeping warrior maiden Brünhilde (Dejanira) from a circle of fire. The last act of the film with the evil king and his gnomish advisor is similar to the last opera of the cycle, with the characters Gunther, his sister Grimhilde and Hagen even retaining their names from the opera, though unlike the opera, Quest for the Mighty Sword does not end with the hero's death.

== Release ==
In the United States, Quest for the Mighty Sword was released direct-to-video on August 29, 1990.

The film was also released as Ator III: The Hobgoblin, The Hobgoblin, and in Germany as Troll 3 (German release title). D'Amato personally referred to the film as The Lord of Akili in a 1996 interview.

== Reception ==
John Stanley called the film "[a]nother pathetic entry in the Italian-produced Ator series". Keith Bailey gave it a rating of one out of five stars, categorising it as "so bad it's good", with reservations due to some "dull moments". He wrote that the film's hero "manages to avoid spaghetti sauce lava when not fighting Siamese-twin robots and mucus-covered Godzilla clones in a quest that really doesn't seem to have any specific goal" and thus grants that "there are some hilariously bad sequences that will please fans of the abysmal".
