= More Sexy Canterbury Tales =

1972 film by Joe D'Amato

Sollazzevoli storie di mogli gaudenti e mariti penitenti - Decameron n° 69
- English: More Sexy Canterbury Tales
- Directed by: Joe D'Amato
- Screenplay by: Joe D'Amato
- Story by: Joe D'Amato
- Produced by: Oscar Santaniello; Franco Gaudenzi
- Starring: Monica Audras; Marzia Damon; Francesca Romana Davila; Attilio Dottesio; Ari Hanow
- Cinematography: Joe D'Amato
- Edited by: Piera Bruni; Gianni Simoncelli
- Music by: Franco Salina (composer); Roberto Pregadio (conductor)
- Production company: Transglobe Italiana
- Distributed by: Variety Distribution
- Release date: 1972
- Running time: 85 minutes
- Country: Italy
- Language: Italian

More Sexy Canterbury Tales (also known as More Filthy Canterbury Tales; Italian: Sollazzevoli storie di mogli gaudenti e mariti penitenti - Decameron n° 69, lit. 'Facetious tales of pleasure-loving wives and penitent husbands - Decameron number 69') is a 1972 Italian decamerotic comedy film directed and shot by Joe D'Amato, who also wrote the story and acts in a small part as one of the monks.

Because D'Amato wanted to stay unaccredited as director, the directorial credit in the Italian version reads "Romano Gastaldi" - a pseudonym of Romano Scandariato (who acted as assistant director in this film) - and in the English version "Ralph Zucker". As cinematographer, D'Amato is credited under his birth name Aristide Massaccesi.

== Synopsis ==
The film's narrative frame is introduced in the title credits with a group of monks running away from their Father Superior to visit a convent of nuns. While the younger friars get to be with the more attractive nuns, the Father Superior is caught and taken in by an old and lecherous nun.

The main part of the film is taken up by three episodes, between which is a short vignette that shows the monks and the nuns before and after their trysts.

In the first episode (Italian: Le due cognate), an old husband leaves his young wife for a business trip, and his wife uses his absence to invite a young sculptor to have sex. When her husband's sister unexpectedly arrives, she too has sex with the sculptor.

In the second episode (Italian: Fra' Giovanni), a young priest falls in love with a young wife during confession, during which she seduces him. She then lets him pay for sexual favours. Having finally tired of him, she tells her brutish husband of his advances, who squeezes the priest's penis with the lid of a chest in such a way that the priest is forced to castrate himself with a knife.

In the final episode (Italian: Lavinia e Lucia), a young man successfully infiltrates the household of a rich merchant and his sexually unfulfilled wife by disguising himself as a maid. When the husband finds out about "her" penis, he nonetheless lets "her" stay and even orders "her" to sleep with his wife. He has found out that the offspring of hermaphrodites is always male.

The frame story is resumed at the end of the third episode. The situation is now reversed: The monks are walking back to their own monastery, slowly and worn out, while their Father Superior walks behind and spurs them on. Since he thought it unfair that he never gets the younger nuns, he made them have sex with the old and lecherous nun.

== Cast ==
In alphabetical order (as shown in the Italian title credits):

- Monica Audras
- Marzia Damon (Caterina Chiani)
- Francesca Romana Davila (Enza Sbordone)
- Attilio Dottesio
- Ari Hanow
- Stefano Oppedisano
- Maria Pia Regoli
- Antonio Spaccatini
- Gianni Ucci

Unaccredited (among others):

- Tony Askin (Antonio Aschi)
- Franco Lo Cascio
- Joe D'Amato
- Giorgio Dolfin
- Vera Drudi
- Pasquale Fasciano
- Mimmo Poli
- Romano Scandariato

== Release ==
In Italy, the film passed the board of censorship on 11 August 1972; it was released to cinemas the same year and was later distributed on VHS by Shendene & Moizzi in their "Collezzione decamerotico" and shown on Italian TV.

In Germany, the film was distributed theatrically by Mercator under the title Hemmungslos der Lust verfallen. In Great Britain, it was passed uncut with a run time of 75 minutes and 50 seconds under the title More Filthy Canterbury Tales.

== Critical reception ==
In 1999, Marco Giusti called it "a cruel decameron, and erotically much more daring than usual" (Italian: "decamerone truce e molto più spinto del solito sull'erotismo").

In 2004, Gordiano Lupi called the film "entertaining, well written, erotic in the right amount" (Italian: "divertente, ben sceneggiato, erotico al punto giusto"). Lupi highlighted Franco Salina's theme song that plays during the opening and end credits and starts with the lyrics, Italian: "Padre, padre, padre superiore / i nostri cuori difendi dal peccato..." (translation: "Father, father, father superior, defend our hearts from sin..."). Its melody returns throughout the film.

In his 2015 monograph on Joe D'Amato, Sébastien Gayraud saw a thematic link between the self-castration in the film's second episode and the ending of D'Amato's later film Sesso nero.

== Bibliography ==
- Gayraud, Sébastien (2015). Joe D'Amato: le réalisateur fantôme (in French). Artus films. p. 32 and 49. ISBN 978-2954843513.
- Giusti, Marco (1999). Dizionario dei film italiani stracult (in Italian). Sperling & Kupfer. pp. 716–717. ISBN 9788820029197.
- Lupi, Gordiano (2004). Erotismo, orrore e pornografia secondo Joe D'Amato (in Italian). Mondo Ignoto. pp. 33–34. ISBN 9788889084496.
