= Gabriele Tinti (actor) =

Italian actor (1932–1991)

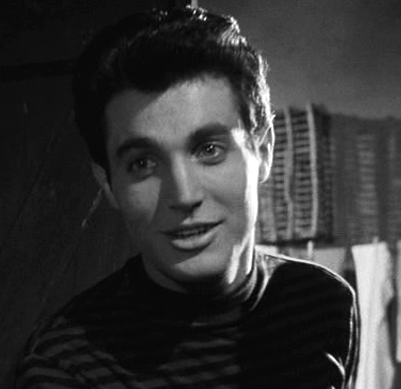
- Tinti in Chronicle of Poor Lovers (1954)
- Born: Gastone Tinti; 22 August 1932; Molinella, Emilia-Romagna, Italy
- Died: 12 November 1991 (aged 59); Rome, Lazio, Italy
- Other names: Gus Stone, Gabrielle Tinti, Gabriel Tinti, Gastone Tinti, Steve Wyler
- Occupation: Actor
- Years active: 1951–1991
- Spouses: Norma Bengell (m. 1963; div. 1969); Laura Gemser (m. 1976)

Gabriele Tinti (born Gastone Tinti; 22 August 1932 – 12 November 1991) was an Italian actor, whose film career spanned over 100 roles between 1951 and 1991.

== Early life ==
Born Gastone Tinti in Molinella, he was the child of working-class parents Altimora (née Bassi) and Luigi Tinti, and his family frequently struggled with poverty throughout his childhood. He moved to Rome in pursuit of work in his teens, which led him to be discovered by a casting director, and he made his debut in the 1948 film Difficult Years.

== Career ==
Tinti eventually got his first major starring role in the 1954 movie Chronicle of Poor Lovers. The role brought him the reputation of a matinee idol and romantic lead, often playing the role of a friendly and vigorous young man. The contemporaneous French press would refer to him as the "Italian Alain Delon".

Tinti alternated between leading and supporting roles in various films throughout the 1960's and '70s, in a variety of genres. In 1964, he played in the French movie The Troops of St. Tropez. In 1968, he made an appearance in "Mayberry R.F.D." the last episode of The Andy Griffith Show. The episode served as the transition episode for the then-new TV series of the same name.

He appeared in three films by American director Robert Aldrich (Sodom and Gomorrah, The Flight of the Phoenix, The Legend of Lylah Clare). In 1971, Tinti played the seductive Don César in the French film Delusions of Grandeur.

By the end of the 1960s, Tinti used his playboy looks to shift his acting career towards exploitation and B movies, including several directed by Joe D'Amato and featuring his wife Laura Gemser. He starred in many films of the Black Emanuelle series, starring Gemser.

His last acting role was in Christian de Chalonge's The Children Thief (1991).

== Personal life ==
Tinti was married to the Brazilian actress Norma Bengell from 1963 to 1969. He later married Laura Gemser in 1976, after the two had met on the set of Black Emanuelle.

=== Death ===
Tinti died suddenly of cardiac arrest in Rome on 12 November 1991, at the age of 59.

== Legacy ==
Tinti was the subject of the 2016 documentary Come in un film: La vera storia di Gabriele (Gastone) Tinti.

== Selected filmography ==
- Amor non ho... però... però (1951) - Un componente dell'orchestra
- Falsehood (1952) - Il giovane corteggiatore di Luisa (uncredited)
- In Olden Days (1952) - Il giovanotto sul treno (segment "Meno di un giorno") (uncredited)
- Easy Years (1953) - Piero Loffredo
- Chronicle of Poor Lovers (1954) - Mario Parigi
- Days of Love (1954) - Gino
- The Little Rebels (1955) - Marcel, le surveillant
- Il coraggio (1955) - Raffaele Vaccarellio
- Scapricciatiello (1955) - The Baron Renato De Rosa / Scapricciatiello
- The Band of Honest Men (1956) - Michele, figlio di Bonocore
- Totò lascia o raddoppia? (1956) - Bruno Palmieri
- Time of Vacation (1956) - Luciano
- El Alamein (1957) - Sergio Marchi
- Malafemmena (1957) - Eduardo
- Sorrisi e canzoni (1958) - Renato Proietti
- Serenatella sciuè sciuè (1958) - Mario
- Non sono più Guaglione (1958) - Vincenzino
- Civitas Dei (1958)
- Lost Souls (1959) - Carlo
- Destinazione Sanremo (1959) - Tonino
- Goliath and the Barbarians (1959)
- Agosto, donne mie non vi conosco (1959) - Nardo
- David and Goliath (1960)
- Il principe fusto (1960)
- Letto a tre piazze (1960) - Nino, il fidanzato di Prassede
- Caccia al marito (1960) - Ingegnere Gabriele Bini
- Heaven on Earth (1960) - Antonio Verbano
- Esther and the King (1960) - Samual
- Madri pericolose (1960) - Carlo Bianchi
- Journey Beneath the Desert (1961) - Max
- Ulysses Against the Son of Hercules (1962) - Mercurio
- Alone Against Rome (1962) - Goruk
- La banda Casaroli (1962) - Agente Spinelli
- Sodom and Gomorrah (1962) - Lieutenant
- The Condemned of Altona (1962) - Actor
- The Seventh Sword (1962) - Corvo
- Torpedo Bay (1963)
- Weeping for a Bandit (1964) - Comandante
- Noite Vazia (1964) - Nelson
- The Troops of St. Tropez (1964) - Gangster chauffeur
- Le tardone (1964) - Giorgio (episode "Canto flamenco")
- Seven Golden Men (1965) - Aldo (l'italien)
- Playa de Formentor (1965) - Miguel
- The Flight of the Phoenix (1965) - Gabriele
- Seven Golden Men Strike Again (1966) - Aldo
- Trap for the Assassin (1966) - Raymond de Noirville
- L'homme de Mykonos (1966) - Silvio Donati
- Brigade antigangs (1966) - Jobic Le Goff
- The Oldest Profession (1967) - L'uomo del mar (segment "Ère préhistorique, L'")
- Son of Django (1967) - Jeff Tracy
- The Wild Eye (1967) - Valentino
- The Legend of Lylah Clare (1968) - Paolo
- The Libertine (1968) - Man in Car
- Ecce Homo (1968) - Len
- The Tough and the Mighty (1969) - Nanni Ripari
- Check to the Queen (1969) - Franco
- Rider on the Rain (1970) - Tony Mau
- Death Occurred Last Night (1970) - Mascaranti
- Qui ? (1970) - Claude
- Cannon for Cordoba (1970) - Antonio
- The Seven Headed Lion (1970) - American Agent
- Sapho ou La fureur d'aimer (1971) - Aldo
- Il sorriso del ragno (1971)
- The Contract (1971) - Flaggert
- Delusions of Grandeur (1971) - Don Cesar
- Al tropico del cancro (1972) - Fred Wright
- The Countess Died of Laughter (1973) - Vincent van der Straaten
- La isla misteriosa y el capitán Nemo (1973) - Ayrton
- Le complot (1973) - Moret
- Profession: Aventuriers (1973)
- Lisa and the Devil (1973) - George
- 24 ore... non un minuto di più (1973)
- I figli di nessuno (1974) - Guido Canali
- And Now My Love (1974) - Six-Day Husband
- Seduzione coniugale (1974)
- The Eerie Midnight Horror Show (1974) - Luisa's Lover
- Impossible Is Not French (1974) - Count Jean-Charles de Bonfort
- La sensualità è un attimo di vita (1975) - Antonio
- Children of Rage (1975) - Dr. Russanak
- Black Emanuelle (1975) - Richard Clifton
- Sins Without Intentions (1975) - Maurizio
- Sex, Demons and Death (1975) - Marcello Martinozzi
- Sex Diary (1976) - Luca's Friend
- As of Tomorrow (1976) - The Boss
- La ragazza dalla pelle di corallo (1976) - Fabrizio
- Emanuelle in Bangkok (1976) - Roberto
- Big Pot (1976) - Michael
- Black Cobra Woman (1976) - Jules Carmichael
- Black Emmanuelle, White Emmanuelle (1976) - Carlo
- Emanuelle in America (1977) - Alfredo Elvize, Duke of Mount Elba
- Sister Emanuelle (1977) - Rene
- Gangbuster (1977) - Tony
- Emanuelle and the Last Cannibals (1977) - Professor Mark Lester
- Emanuelle and the White Slave Trade (1978) - Francis Harley
- La mujer de la tierra caliente (1978) - Don Giuliano
- Voglia di donna (1978) - Bruno
- ...And Give Us Our Daily Sex (1979) - Professor (uncredited)
- Don't Trust the Mafia (1979) - Tony Lo Bianco
- Emanuelle's Daughter (1980) - Tommy / Victor's friend
- International Prostitution: Brigade criminelle (1980) - Tony Marcone
- Porno Esotic Love (1980) - Steve
- Die Todesgöttin des Liebescamps (1981) - Gabriel
- Nessuno è perfetto (1981) - Nanni
- Caligula... The Untold Story (1982) - Marcellus Agrippa
- Violence in a Women's Prison (1982) - Doctor Moran
- Messo comunale praticamente spione (1982) - Gastone
- La belva dalla calda pelle (1982) - Bony
- Emanuelle Escapes from Hell (1983) - Crazy Boy Henderson
- Endgame (1983) - Bull
- Dagger Eyes (1983) - Mink
- Il peccato di Lola (1984) - Angus
- The Secret of Seagull Island (1985) - Enzo Lombardi
- The Pleasure (1985) - Gerard Villeneuve
- Cut and Run (1985) - Manuel
- Passaporto segnalato (1985)
- Senza vergogna (1986) - Massimo
- Il mostro di Firenze (1986) - Enrico
- Convent of Sinners (1986) - Monsignore
- Giuro che ti amo (1986)
- Beaks: The Movie (1987) - Rod
- Riflessi di luce (1988) - Federico / composer
- Non aver paura della zia Marta (1988) - Richard Hamilton
- La stanza delle parole (1989) - Michele (uncredited)
- La puritana (1989) - Alfieri
- The Crawlers (1990) - Dr. Pritzi (uncredited)
- The Children Thief (1991) - L'argentin 1
