= Voglia di guardare =

- Italian theatrical release poster
- Voglia di guardare
- Directed by: Joe D'Amato
- Written by: Aristide Massaccesi; Donatella Donati
- Starring: Jenny Tamburi
- Cinematography: Joe D'Amato
- Edited by: Joe D'Amato
- Music by: Guido Anelli; Stefano Mainetti
- Production company: Filmirage
- Distributed by: D.M.V.
- Release date: 3 April 1986 (Italy)
- Running time: 89 minutes
- Country: Italy

Voglia di guardare, also known as Midnight Gigolo and Peep Show, is a 1986 Italian erotic film directed by Joe D'Amato.

== Plot ==
Christina is the neglected wife of Diego, an overworked doctor. Feeling more and more alone, she decides to begin a relationship with the beautiful Andrea, who is also the owner of an elegant bordello.

== Cast ==
- Jenny Tamburi as Christina
- Lilli Carati as Francesca
- Laura Gemser as Josephine
- Marino Masé as Diego
- Sebastiano Somma as Andrea
- Aldina Martano

== See also ==
- List of Italian films of 1986
