= I predatori delle Antille =

- Directed by: Joe D'Amato (as David Hills)
- Written by: Donna Dane
- Produced by: Gianfranco Romagnoli
- Starring: Anita Skultéty
- Music by: Piero Montanari
- Release date: 1999
- Running time: 95 minutes (original theatrical release)
- Country: Italy
- Language: Italian

I predatori delle Antille, released in the United States as Sexy Pirates on DVD, is a 1998 pirate film directed by Joe D'Amato.

== Plot ==
Sir Francis Hamilton (Menyhért René Balog-Dutombé), an ambassador of Charles II of England (Lajos Dejan) is on his way to Jamaica when his ship is attacked by pirates led by notorious George Rackham (Henrik Pauer). Pirates kidnap Sir Francis and demand from his wife Lady Elena Hamilton (Anita Skultéty) a great sum of ransom money. Lady Hamilton pleads the king for help but she is rejected. However, daring Lady Hamilton is not willing to give in to the pirates and commissions Captain Graham (Zoltán Kiss) to gather a band of mercenaries to storm the pirates' lair and free Sir Francis. Captain Graham suggests to hire pirate Thomas Butler (Carlo De Palma) of Tortuga. Butler has a condition: If they succeed in saving Sir Francis, Lady Hamilton will sleep with Butler. Lady Hamilton agrees and they set sail but Butler's ambitious mistress Pilar (Venere Torti) who accompanies them starts to grow jealous day by day.

== Release ==
According to Gian Luca Castoldi, the film was only released for the direct-to-video market.

In the United States, a DVD entitled Sexy Pirates was released by "One Seven Movies" on April 5, 2011, which presents the film full screen in Italian language with English subtitles.

== Reception ==
Reviewing the "One Seven" DVD release, Mike Noyes felt that the film almost fell into the "so bad it's good" because of its "ridiculous swashbuckling scenes" and "bad-ass" female lead character. However, Noyes also observed the detrimental lack of plot and erotic content, stating that "while you see plenty of flesh in [the four erotic] scenes there is nothing more than just that. Every time a sex scene is about to get going it cuts away."

== Bibliography ==
- Noyes, Mike (May 18, 2011). "Sexy Pirates – DVD Review | Inside Pulse".
