= Endgame (1983 film) =

- Endgame film poster
- Directed by: Joe D'Amato
- Written by: Alex Carver; Joe D'Amato
- Produced by: Joe D'Amato
- Starring: Al Cliver; Laura Gemser; George Eastman; Jack Davis
- Cinematography: Joe D'Amato
- Music by: Carlo Maria Cordio
- Distributed by: American National Enterprises
- Release date: 1983
- Running time: 98 minutes
- Country: Italy
- Language: Italian

Endgame (Bronx lotta finale) (transl. Endgame: Bronx Final Battle) is a 1983 Italian post-apocalyptic film starring Al Cliver, Laura Gemser and George Eastman. It was directed, co-written and produced by Joe D'Amato, under the pseudonym "Steven Benson".

== Synopsis ==
In the year 2025, a nuclear holocaust has left New York City an irradiated, but not abandoned, wasteland. (It appears the Nuclear War that caused the devastation happened in the late 1980s or early 1990s based on the technology people have available.) The ruined city is inhabited now by scavenger packs and telepathic mutants, who are persecuted by the elite survivors. Keeping the few remaining people pacified is the reality television program Endgame, where hunters and gladiators fight to the death for large financial winnings.

The elites in power in the city have their security forces seeking out and killing mutants who populate the ruins of the city. The non-mutant Professor Levin helps the mutants survive and hide from the security forces seeking to kill them.

The star and veteran fighter from Endgame, Ron Shannon (Al Cliver), convinces his nemesis to help him assemble a team to take a group of mind-reading mutants across the desert to safety. They need to avoid such dangers as blind fighting monks, nomadic predators, government agents, and Shannon's friend, now turned nemesis, Karnak (George Eastman). The leader of the mutants is Lilith (Laura Gemser) and she has promised that if the team assembled by Shannon can succeed in getting the mutants to safety, a fortune awaits them.

== Cast ==
- Al Cliver as Ron Shannon
- Laura Gemser as Lilith
- George Eastman as Karnak
- Jack Davis as Professor Levin
- Hal Yamanouchi as Ninja
- Gabriele Tinti as Bull
- Mario Pedone as Kovack
- Gordon Mitchell as Colonel Morgan

== Release ==
Endgame was released in Italy on November 5, 1983.

== Reception ==
While noting that this is a Mad Max "ripoff", and that the battle sequences seem endless, Creature Feature gave the movie 2.5 out of 5 stars. Million Monkey Theater found that the movie is a mixture of The Running Man and any number of post-apocalyptic movies and had issues with the acting, but stated the fans of the genre would like the film. George Eastman remarked "The idea was alright...but like all the others, it was made on too small a budget. These (post-atomic) films, which were made in the wake of the various Mad Max movies, were decidedly crummy. The set designs were poor....and the genre met a swift and well-deserved death." Kim Newman found the movie "initially promising".

== Home Release ==
The movie has been released on DVD and on Blu-ray by Severin Films.
