= Crime Boss (film) =

- Directed by: Alberto De Martino
- Screenplay by: Lucio Manlio Battistrada; Alberto De Martino
- Story by: Lucio Manlio Battisrada; Luigi Mordini
- Produced by: Gino Mordini
- Starring: Antonio Sabàto; Telly Savalas; Paola Tedesco
- Cinematography: Aristide Massaccesi
- Edited by: Otello Colangeli
- Music by: Francesco De Masi
- Production company: Claudia Cinematografica
- Distributed by: P.A.C.
- Release date: 8 August 1972 (Italy)
- Running time: 103 minutes
- Country: Italy
- Box office: ₤498.812 million

Crime Boss (Italian: I familiari delle vittime non saranno avvertiti, "The victims' families won't be told") is a 1972 Italian crime film directed by Alberto De Martino.

== Production ==
Crime Boss was filmed at Incir-De Paolis Film Studios in Rome and on location in Milan, Palermo, Rome and Hamburg. Director Alberto De Martino joked about the film later, stating it was "the story of Caesar and Brutus, essentially [...] a bit like Shakespears so to speak."

== Release ==
Crime Boss was released theatrically in Italy on 8 August 1972 where it was distributed by P.A.C. The film grossed 498,812,000 Italian lire on its domestic release.

== Reception ==
From a retrospective review, film historian Roberto Curti praised Aristide Massaccesi's "efficient camerawork" but that the film does not "live up to its impressive opening", noting that Lucio Battistrada's screenplay "becomes cliché-ridden" and that Antonio Sabàto was "wooden as usual".

== Footnotes ==
=== References ===
- Curti, Roberto (2013). Italian Crime Filmography, 1968-1980. McFarland. ISBN 978-0786469765.
