= Giubbe rosse =

1975 film by Joe D'Amato

Cormack of the Mounties
- Italian: Giubbe rosse
- Directed by: Joe D'Amato
- Written by: Joe D'Amato (as Aristide Massaccesi); Claudio Bernabei; George Eastman (uncredited)
- Produced by: Alfonso Donati
- Starring: Fabio Testi; Guido Mannari; Lynne Frederick
- Cinematography: Joe D'Amato (as Aristide Massaccesi)
- Edited by: Bruno Micheli
- Music by: Carlo Rustichelli
- Distributed by: Cineriz
- Release date: 24 April 1975 (Italy)
- Running time: 97 minutes
- Country: Italy
- Language: Italian

Giubbe rosse (Red Coats), internationally released as Cormack of the Mounties, Killers of the Savage North, Red Coat and Royal Mounted Police, is a 1975 Italian adventure film co-written and directed by Joe D'Amato. It is part of a brief series of films that tried to market the commercial success of Lucio Fulci's White Fang presenting very similar plots and settings. D'Amato co-wrote the film with writer/actor George Eastman, who went on to star in a dozen or more D'Amato films. It was the first film that Aristide Massaccesi signed with his stage name Joe D'Amato.

== Plot ==
Caribou uses the wages of his girlfriend Elizabeth, a sought-after singer, to pay for debts incurred through poker and drinking. When an angry mob chases him from the saloon, the Canadian Mountie Bill Cormack rescues him.

Caribou becomes an outlaw. He and a band steal from a gold transport. With the booty, Caribou goes to Elizabeth to emigrate with her to the States. She, however, decides against it; she wants to stay close to Bill, although he does not seem to share her affection. Hatred arises between the men, and Bill decides his job is to keep Caribou from doing any more harm.

Years later, Elizabeth and Bill are married and have a son, Jimmy. Caribou escapes again from the prison where he has served time many times. When he finds Bill, Elizabeth is dead and Jimmy in his sole care. Caribou kidnaps Jimmy, taking him to the north, where he hid the stolen gold. With a posse of redcoats, Bill follows his trail. The former cronies, led by Wolf, are also after him. When Jimmy falls ill on the way, he is operated on by a doctor. This is how Bill gets to know the whereabouts of Caribou. In a final confrontation, Bill spares Caribou's life. It turns out he is his brother. Together, they fight the other outlaws to save Jimmy. The battle is won, but Caribou is killed.

== Cast ==
- Fabio Testi: Corporal Bill Cormack
- Guido Mannari: Cariboo
- Renato Cestiè: Jimmy
- Lynne Frederick: Elizabeth
- Lionel Stander: Doctor Higgins
- Lars Bloch: Andy
- Robert Hundar: Wolf
- Daniele Dublino
- Wendy D'Olive: Shee-Noa
- Bruno Corazzari: Logan
- Paolo Magalotti
- Luigi Antonio Guerra
- Aldo Cecconi
- Marco D'Annunzio: Cochise

== Production ==
The film was the first of a three-picture contract the distribution company Cineriz had with Fabio Testi, the latter two being Four of the Apocalypse and Go Gorilla Go.

== Release ==
The film premiered theatrically in Italy on 24 April 1975, distributed by Cineriz. In West Germany, the first theatrical screening was two years later on 17 May 1977, with a runtime of 90 minutes. In 1978, the film was shown theatrically in Accra, Ghana, under its title Cormack of the Mounties.

On DVD, the film was released in Italy on 22 November 2016 by "CG Entertainment" in the "Cinekult" series.

== Box office ==
Red Coats did poorly at the box office.

Strangely though, during an interview, when asked which was his best film from that period, D'Amato said "Undoubtedly, "Giubbe Rosse", which also made a lot of money".

== Bibliography ==
- Bruckner, Ulrich P. (2002). Für ein paar Leichen mehr: der Italo-Western von seinen Anfängen bis heute (in German). Schwarzkopf & Schwarzkopf. p. 428. ISBN 9783896027054.
