= Laura Gemser =

Indonesian-Dutch model, actress, and costume designer (retired)

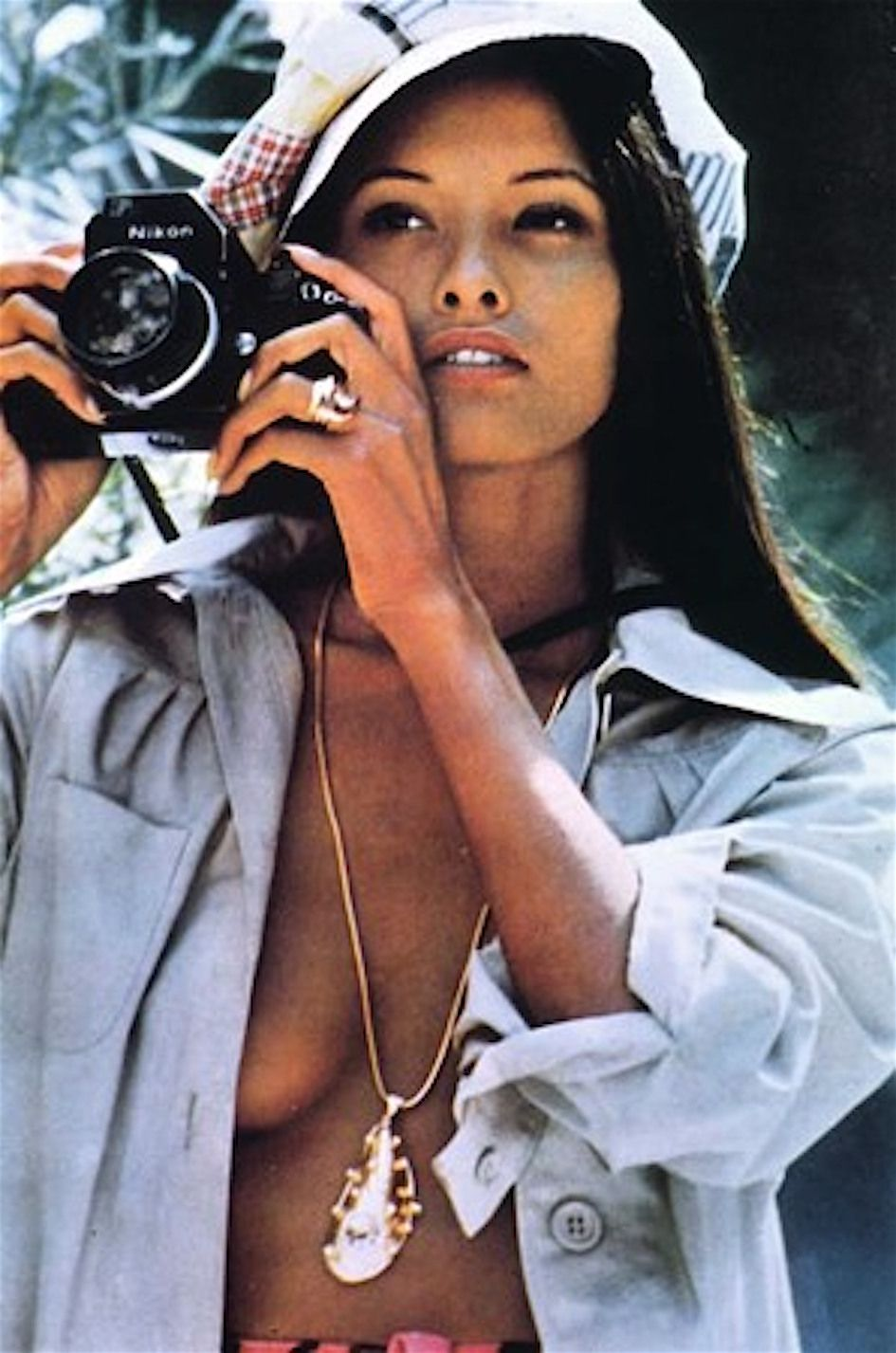
- Gemser in Black Emanuelle (1975)
- Born: Laurette Marcia Gemser; 5 October 1950 (age 76); Surabaya, Indonesia
- Other names: Emanuelle; Moira Chen
- Citizenship: Dutch
- Occupations: Actress; model; costume designer
- Years active: 1971–1993
- Spouse: Gabriele Tinti (m. 1976; died 1991)

Laurette Marcia Gemser (born 5 October 1950) is an Indonesian-Dutch retired actress, model and costume designer. She is primarily known for her work in Italian erotic cinema, such as the Emanuelle series. Many of her films were collaborations with directors Joe D'Amato and Bruno Mattei.

Gemser has also been credited as Moira Chen in Love Is Forever (1983).

== Early life ==
Gemser left Indonesia in 1955, at the age of four, and moved with her parents to the Netherlands. She grew up in the Dutch city of Utrecht, where she attended the MULO Regentesseschool high school. After that, she attended the Artibus Art School in Utrecht, where she specialised in fashion design.

== Career ==
After modelling in various magazines in the Netherlands and Belgium, in 1974 she moved to Italy to star in the erotic film Amore libero - Free Love. The film was a box office success and launched Gemser's career. She played one of the masseuses in the 1975 film Emmanuelle 2 (a.k.a. Emmanuelle, The Joys of a Woman), and later that year took the starring role in Bitto Albertini's Black Emanuelle. She starred in 5 Black Emanuelle films in less than three years.

She starred as Laotian actress Keo Sirisomphone in Michael Landon's 1983 American television film, Love Is Forever, in which she was credited as Moira Chen. During the 1970s and 1980s, she made many movies with Joe D'Amato. Gemser continued to make films, at times working with her actor husband, Gabriele Tinti (m. 1976–1991). In the 1990s, she retired from films to work on costume designing for film, and completely vanished from the public life.

== Partial filmography ==
Note: The films listed with a "-" are not necessarily chronological.

Title	Year	Credited as			Role	Notes	Refs.
Title	Year	Actor	Costume designer	Other	Role	Notes	Refs.
Amore libero - Free Love	1974	Yes			Jeannie	Credited as Emanuelle in the film.	
Black Emanuelle	1975	Yes					
Emanuelle in Bangkok	—N/a	Yes			Emanuelle		
Voyage of the Damned	1976	Yes			Estredes Geliebte		
Black Cobra Woman	—N/a	Yes			Eva		
Smooth Velvet, Raw Silk	—N/a	Yes			Emanuelle		
Emanuelle in America	—N/a	Yes			Emanuelle		
La spiaggia del desiderio	—N/a	Yes			Haidé		
Voto di castità	—N/a	Yes			Iliana		
Crime Busters	—N/a	Yes			Susy Li		
Emanuelle and the Last Cannibals	1977	Yes			Emanuelle		
Emanuelle Around the World	1977	Yes			Emanuelle		
Le notti porno nel mondo	—N/a	Yes			Herself		
Suor Emanuelle	—N/a	Yes			suor Emanuelle		
Emanuelle e le pornonotti	—N/a	Yes			—N/a		
Emanuelle and the White Slave Trade	—N/a	Yes			Emanuelle		
Voglia di donna	—N/a	Yes			principessa africana		
La mujer de la tierra caliente	—N/a	Yes			—N/a		
...And Give Us Our Daily Sex	1979	Yes			Verónica's Friend		
Erotic Nights of the Living Dead	—N/a	Yes			indigena		
Porno Esotic Love	—N/a	Yes			—N/a		
Murder Obsession	1981	Yes			Betty		
Die Todesgöttin des Liebescamps	1981	Yes			Die Göttliche		
Melani Queen of Sados	—N/a	Yes			—N/a		
Ator, the Fighting Eagle	1982	Yes			Indunn		
Violence in a Women's Prison	1982	Yes			Emanuelle Larson		
La belva dalla calda pelle	—N/a	Yes			Sheila		
Caligula, the Untold Story	—N/a	Yes			Myriam		
Invaders of the Lost Gold	—N/a	Yes			Maria		
Women's Prison Massacre	—N/a	Yes			Emmanuelle		
Love Is Forever	1983	Yes			Keo Sirisomphone	Credited as Moira Chen	
Endgame	—N/a	Yes			Lilith	Credited as Moira Chen	
L'Alcova	—N/a	Yes			Zerbal, la schiava		
The Pleasure	—N/a	Yes			Haunani		
Voglia di guardare	—N/a	Yes			—N/a		
Riflessi di luce	—N/a	Yes			—N/a		
Top Model	—N/a	Yes			Dorothy		
Hot Steps	—N/a		Yes				
Quest for the Mighty Sword	1990	Yes			Grimilde		
Troll 2	1990		Yes				
Passion's Flowers	—N/a		Yes	Yes		Scene designer	
Woman's Secret - Il segreto di una donna	—N/a		Yes				
