= A Lustful Mind =

- Italian theatrical release poster by Enzo Sciotti
- Lussuria
- Directed by: Joe D'Amato
- Written by: René Rivet
- Starring: Lilli Carati; Al Cliver
- Cinematography: Joe D'Amato
- Edited by: Aristide Massaccesi
- Music by: Guido Anelli; Stefano Mainetti
- Production companies: Filmirage; Cinema 80
- Distributed by: C.R.C.
- Release date: 15 May 1986 (Italy)
- Running time: 83 minutes
- Country: Italy

A Lustful Mind (Italian: Lussuria; known as Lujuria in Spain) is a 1986 Italian erotic drama film directed by Joe D'Amato.

== Plot ==
Alessio, a young man seemingly ordinary, lives the relationships with the other sex in a traumatic way. In particular, he is persecuted by nightmares where he sees himself at the mercy of the women closest to him: his aunt, his sister and even her mother.

== Cast ==
- Lilli Carati as Marta
- Noemie Chelkoff as Marina
- Al Cliver as Roberto
- Martin Philips as Alessio
- Ursula Foti as Alessio's sister

== Release ==
The film grossed 308.000.000 Italian lira on its release.

== See also ==
- List of Italian films of 1986
