= Miles O'Keeffe =

American actor

- Occupation: actor
- Years active: 1980–2010

Miles O'Keeffe is an American film and television actor. O'Keeffe got his first big break playing the title role in the 1981 version of Tarzan, the Ape Man.

== Youth ==
A star football athlete, O'Keeffe attended the United States Air Force Academy Prep School and played halfback on the Prep School football team in 1972. However, in 1973 he transferred to Mississippi State University under a football scholarship, playing as an offensive lineman. During this time, he bulked up to 240 lb (110 kg). Subsequently, he transferred to University of the South in Sewanee, Tennessee and became a small college All-American playing both tight end and linebacker.

After studying political science and psychology, O'Keeffe became a prison counselor in the Tennessee penal system for a year or two where he became manager of playground activities and inmate weightlifting programs. He left for California to play in a semi-professional rugby team before becoming involved with Hollywood.

== Acting career ==
Although O'Keeffe is known for his big break as Tarzan, he is also remembered for his performances in the title role of the first three Ator sword and sorcery films produced in Europe in the 1980s. The series gained attention in 1991 after a re-edited version of the second installment, released as Cave Dwellers, was lampooned on the television series Mystery Science Theater 3000 (MST3K). The episode, which soon became immensely popular among fans, included one of the most-quoted quips in the show's history: "How much Keeffe is in this movie anyway?" "Miles O'Keeffe!" Unlike some of MST3K's subjects (such as Sandy Frank), O'Keeffe is considered to be a "good sport" and is a fan of the series. He enjoyed the MST3K treatment of the film so much that he requested a copy of the episode.

O'Keeffe gained cult status in the UK between 1999 and 2002 as a result of being targeted by chat show host Graham Norton for prank calls, eventually appearing on the show So Graham Norton to great acclaim.

== Selected filmography ==
- Tarzan, the Ape Man (1981), as Tarzan
- Ator, The Fighting Eagle (1982)
- S.A.S. à San Salvador (1983), as Malko Linge
- The Blade Master (a.k.a. Ator 2 - L'invincibile Orion, a.k.a. Cave Dwellers) (1984)
- Sword of the Valiant: The Legend of Sir Gawain and the Green Knight (1984)
- The Bengal Lancers! (1984, unfinished)
- Lone Runner (1986)
- Iron Warrior (a.k.a. Ator 3) (1987)
- Double Target (1987)
- Campus Man (1987)
- Waxwork (1988)
- The Drifter (1988)
- Phantom Raiders (1988), as Python
- Dead On: Relentless II (1992)
- Zero Tolerance (1994)
- Millennium Day (1995)
- Silent Hunter (1995)
- Pocahontas: The Legend (1995), as Captain John Smith
- Marked Man (1996)
- Tiger (1997)
- True Vengeance (1997)
- Dead Tides (1997)
- Diamondbacks (1999)
- Unconditional Love (1999)
- Moving Targets (1999)
- Blood and Honor (2000)
- Out of the Black (2001)
- The Unknown (a.k.a. Clawed: The Legend of Sasquatch) (2005)
