= Ator =

1980s Italian film series by Joe D'Amato

- Directed by: Joe D'Amato; Alfonso Brescia
- Produced by: Alex Susmann; John Newman; Ovidio G. Assonitis; Maurizio Maggi; Carlo Maria Cordio
- Starring: Miles O'Keeffe; Eric Allan Kramer; Sabrina Siani; Lisa Foster; Savina Gersak; Margaret Lenzey
- Music by: Carlo Maria Cordio; Carlo Rustichelli
- Running time: 366 minutes
- Countries: Italy; United States
- Languages: Italian; English
- Box office: $1.2 million

Ator refers to a film series of four Italian movies made in the 1980s by director Joe D'Amato, using the pseudonym David Hills. D'Amato wrote and directed the first, second, and fourth films in the series, personally disregarding the existence of the third. The character of Ator was played in the first three films by Miles O'Keeffe, while Eric Allan Kramer played the Son of Ator in the fourth.

Ator is a swordsman, alchemist, scientist, magician, scholar, and engineer with the ability to sometimes produce objects out of thin air (as depicted in Ator 4).

== Films ==
=== Ator l'invincibile ===
The first film in the series is Ator l'invincibile released in the year 1982, translated into English as Ator the Invincible. It was released in America as Ator, The Fighting Eagle. As the film opens, Ator asks his father for permission to marry his sister. Ator's father tells Ator that he is adopted and is allowed to marry his sister if he likes. The rest of the film deals with Ator's sister being kidnapped by the high priest of the Spider Kingdom and Ator having to go on an epic quest to save her.

=== Ator 2 – L'invincibile Orion ===
1984's Ator 2 – L'invincibile Orion, released in America as The Blade Master (and in a re-edited TV version years later as Cave Dwellers) lends credence to the argument that Joe D'Amato was using Ator as a ploy to make money from the Conan films. Like its predecessor, it went into production shortly after the theatrical release of the second Conan film, Conan the Destroyer, and was released later the same year.

In this film, Ator and his sidekick Thong travel from the mythic "Ends of the Earth" to save Ator's mentor from an evil warlord. The film ends with Ator destroying an ancient object of power (called in the film the "Geometric Nucleus") that his mentor was guarding to protect it from falling into the hands of evil men.

Unintentionally comical moments sometimes arise when writer/director Joe D'Amato has Ator use modern-day technology in the film. For example, Ator storms a castle using a 1980s style hang glider, and later destroys the "Geometric Nucleus" in a nuclear bomb explosion, and the film ends with a mushroom cloud.

The film was a box office and home video failure. An edited version entitled Cave Dwellers was featured on a popular episode of Mystery Science Theater 3000, causing it to become a cult sensation. The American theatrical cut, The Blademaster, now enjoys modest success on home video and DVD as a cult favorite.

=== Iron Warrior ===
Joe D'Amato dropped Ator in 1986, around the same time when it became public knowledge that there were no plans to make a third Conan film. Instead, in 1987, a new director, Alfonso Brescia, wrote and directed the third Ator film, Iron Warrior, which follows the same loose plot as Ator 2 – L'invincibile Orion. The film abandons the continuity of the first two films (even so far as to completely contradict Ator's established back-story of having been adopted as a baby, instead opening with him playing as a child with a twin brother). Brescia turns the film into an art house picture, utilizing a variety of cinematic techniques and camera tricks to act as symbols or give deeper meaning to the film. Ator's character is also drastically changed: here, he has black hair in a ponytail, and speaks roughly 50 words in the entire film.

The film pays homage to a number of popular films from the time, including the first Superman film, Indiana Jones and the Temple of Doom, Excalibur, and Raiders of the Lost Ark. The film's score is, as with the first of the series, provided by Carlo Maria Cordio - one of his themes for the film is a simple reworking of a very similar cue heard throughout Joe D'Amato's 1981 film Absurd (also scored by Cordio).

=== Quest for the Mighty Sword ===
In 1990, D'Amato released the final Ator film, Ator l'invincible. Here, Eric Allan Kramer plays Ator and the Son of Ator in a dual role. This is the only film in the series which does not feature Miles O'Keeffe. It was released in Europe and the United States under a variety of different titles including Ator III: The Hobgoblin. The "hobgoblin" suit was recycled from Troll 2, which is the reason why this film was released as Troll 3 in Germany.
