= Counselor at Crime =

1973 film by Alberto De Martino

- Original Italian film poster
- Italian: Il consigliori
- Directed by: Alberto de Martino
- Screenplay by: Adriano Bolzoni; Vincenzo Flamini; Leonardo Martin; Alberto de Martino
- Produced by: Edmondo Amati
- Starring: Tomas Milian; Martin Balsam; Francisco Rabal; Dagmar Lassander; John Anderson
- Cinematography: Aristide Massaccesi; Rafael Pacheco
- Edited by: Otello Colangeli
- Music by: Riz Ortolani
- Production companies: Capitolina Produzioni Cinematografiche; Star Films S.A.
- Distributed by: Fida Cinematografica (Italy); Mercurio Films S.A. (Spain)
- Release dates: 30 August 1973 (Italy); 11 February 1974 (Spain)
- Running time: 100 minutes
- Countries: Italy; Spain
- Box office: ₤685.486 million

Counselor at Crime (Italian: Il consigliori, lit. 'The counsellors', also released as The Counsellor) is a 1973 gangster film directed and co-written by Alberto De Martino, and starring Tomas Milian, Martin Balsam, Francisco Rabal, Dagmar Lassander and John Anderson. It was an Italian and Spanish co-production.

== Plot ==
Recently-minted young lawyer Thomas Accardo is the godson of Sicilian Mafia Don Antonio Macaluso, serving as his consigliere. After brief stint in prison and falling in love with Laura Murchison, Thomas resolves to go straight. However, ambitious capo Vincent Garofolo takes advantage of this, quickly rallying other dissidents and unleashing a war against the Macalusos.

The family's losses and numerous defections lead Thomas to return to hisold post and accept a peacemaking meeting, which only thanks to the fairness of the mediator Don Michele, prevents a massacre. Having moved to Palermo, the Macalusos regroup and confront Garofalo, who has arrived on the island for the final showdown. Eventually, Thomas and Macaluso manage to find Garofalo and kill him and his men, but Thomas dies from his wounds.

== Cast ==
- Tomas Milian as Thomas Accardo
- Martin Balsam as Don Antonio Macaluso
- Francisco Rabal as Vincent Garofalo
- Dagmar Lassander as Laura Murchison
- John Anderson as Don Vito Albanese
- Carlo Tamberlani as Don Michele Villabate
- Manuel Zarzo as Dorsiello
- Sacheen Littlefeather as Maggie
- Eduardo Fajardo as Calogero Vezza
- Franco Angrisano as Torrillo
- Ray K. Goman as Sgt. Dieterle
- Perla Cristal as Dorothy
- George Rigaud as Priest
- Nello Pazzafini as Hitman in Polizzi Generosa

== Production ==
Counselor at Crime was filmed at Cinecittà in Rome, Estudios Cinematograficos in Madrid and on location in San Francisco, Albuquerque, and Palermo.

The cinematography was done by Joe D'Amato, who was credited under his birthname Aristide Massaccesi. Director Alberto de Martino spoke positively on working with D'Amato, stating that he "didn't talk nonsense, he knew how to do his job, and he was quick. It took him a couple of seconds to understand how to light a scene. And whenever he was in trouble with the lighting, he would take the camera in his own hands".

De Martino admitted to having trouble during the screenwriting of the film, stating that he initially wrote the script with his collaborators. They later hired Leonardo Martin to write another part and when they gave the script to producer Edmondo Amati, he stated that it was alright but wanted the dialogue to be revised by his friend Michael Gazzo. A month later, Gazzo sent him a script that was entirely re-written.

De Martino also spoke about Dagmar Lassander, stating that he "cast her in Rome a couple of months before shooting started. She'd just had a baby and I told her she had to lose weight. She said 'Of course, one month's a long time!". When arriving in Albuquerque, she had not lost the weight and De Martino kept her in the film as he would not be able to find a replacement.

== Release ==
Counselor at Crime was released in Italy on August 30, 1973 where it was distributed by Fida Cinematografica. The film grossed a total of 685,486,000 Italian lire in Italy. It was released in Spain the following February.

=== Home media ===
The film was released on Blu-Ray by Kino Lorber, using a new 4K restoration, in September 2026.

== Reception ==
In a review of the film's 2026 Blu-Ray release, Svet Atanasov writes "While based on an original screenplay, The Counsellor also borrows from various classic gangster films, most notably The Godfather.... The strength of The Counsellor is in its quasi-documentary depiction of the drama inside The Organization and Don Macaluso's struggle to protect what he has built his entire life.... Milian looks particularly good as the conflicted, loyal godson who cannot escape his roots."

== Footnotes ==
=== References ===
- Curti, Roberto (2013). Italian Crime Filmography, 1968-1980. McFarland. ISBN 978-0786469765.

== See also ==
- List of Italian films of 1973
