= Zora Kerova =

Czech actress, dancer, singer and model (born 1950)

- Born: Zora Ulla Keslerová; 11 August 1950 (age 75); Prague, Czechoslovakia
- Other names: Zora Keer, Zora Kerowa
- Occupations: Actress; dancer; singer; model
- Years active: 1976–2012
- Spouse: Petr Hapka (m. 1981; div. 1997)
- Children: 1

Zora Ulla Keslerová (born 11 August 1950) is a Czech actress, dancer, singer and model. Often credited under the names Zora Kerova, Zora Kerowa or Zora Keer, she became known for starring in numerous Italian horror films during the 1980s.

Born in Prague, Czechoslovakia, she began her career as a dancer and singer, later becoming a photo model. Kerova made her screen debut in the Italian film, La febbre americana (1978). A year later, she appeared in the Czech drama, Křehké vztahy, and another Italian film, Terror Express. She followed by starring in cult horror films such as Antropophagus (1980), Cannibal Ferox (1981) and Lucio Fulci's The New York Ripper (1982). She later appeared in another two Fulci's films, Touch of Death (1988) and Sodoma's Ghost (1988).

== Early life ==
Zora Kerova was born in Prague, Czechoslovakia.

== Career ==
She began her career as a cultural dancer and singer, and later became a model. Her career expanded and she decided to become an actress. She began her acting career in Italian cinema. In 1978, she made her acting debut in La Febbre Americana, with co-star Italian actor and writer George Eastman (actor), whom she also worked with in later films. In 1979, Zora starred in the Czech film Křehké vztahy (The Fragile Relations), a psychological drama, in which she played a divorced mother. A string of minor film roles followed.

Italian cinema offered more for her career; she became a star in Italy under several names including Zora Kerowa and Zora Keer. She appeared in many erotic, action, and of course horror films throughout the eighties.

Apart from her roles in erotic films, Zora is remembered for starring in several cult horror classics. In 1980, she played psychic "Carol" in Antropophagus, in which she and a group of people head to an island, Carol feels there is something evil on it, and the group is one by one murdered by a madman played by George Eastman. Zora said in interviews she mainly remembers being very seasick in the boating scenes. In a 2005 interview alongside Eastman, Kerova explained that she never really got to know director Joe D'Amato on the set of the film, and that she learned phonetic English by listening to The Beatles.

In 1981, she starred as "Pat Johnson" in Cannibal Ferox, in which she was seen hanging on hooks by her breasts. In 1982, she played "Eva" in The New York Ripper, in which her character gets a smashed liquor bottle into her groin by the insane killer.

Then, Zora again worked with George Eastman in The New Barbarians (also known as Warriors of the Wasteland).

Throughout her acting career she has worked with such directors as Joe D'Amato, Umberto Lenzi, Lucio Fulci, and Ferdinando Baldi. Fulci was her favorite director, and in interviews she dispelled the rumor that he was a misogynist.

Her final cinematic film Papà dice messa came out in 1996, but Kerova returned to acting in 2006 starring in the direct-to-video film La Radice del Male (The Root of Evil) directed by Silvana Zancolò.

== Filmography ==
Film
Year	Title	Role	Notes
1976	La casa dalle finestre che ridono	Waitress (uncredited)	"The House with Laughing Windows"
1978	Le evase - Storie di sesso e di violenze	Anna	"Escape from Women's Prison"
1978	La Febbre Americana	Lisa	"American Fever"
1980	Krehké vztahy	Bára	"The Fragile Relations"
1980	La ragazza del vagone letto	Anna	"Terror Express"
1980	Contes Pervers	Nathalie	"Les Filles de Madame Claude" / "Erotic Tales"
1980	La vera storia della monaca di Monza	Sister Virginia de Leyva	"The True Story of the Nun of Monza"
1980	Antropophagus	Carol	"Anthropophagus: The Beast" / "The Grim Reaper"
1980	Jak napálit advokáta		
1981	Krakonoš a lyžníci	Vichrová	
1981	Cannibal Ferox	Pat Johnson	"Make Them Die Slowly"
1981	Řetěz	Marta Kavanová	
1982	Lo squartatore di New York	Eva	"The New York Ripper"
1982	Sny o Zambezi		"Dreams About Zambezia"
1983	I nuovi barbari	Woman - Moses' Group	"The New Barbarians"
1983	Vítr v kapse	Ilonka	
1984	Anděl s ďáblem v těle	Kristýna - madona spacích vozů	
1985	Fešák Hubert	Ruza	"Hubert the Smart Boy"
1985	Skalpel, prosím	Nurse	
1985	Perinbaba		"The Feather Fairy"
1986	Operace mé dcery		
1988	Quando Alice ruppe lo specchio	Virginia Field	"Touch of Death" (direct-to-video)
1988	Il fantasma di Sodoma	Succubus	"Sodoma's Ghost" (direct-to-video)
1988	Anděl svádí dábla	Jeannette Hazard	
1988	Kdo ví, kdy začne svítat		
1989	Luna di sangue		"Moon of Blood"
1995	Mollo tutto		"I'll Leave It All Behind Me"
1995	Altrove		
1996	Papà dice messa	Mara	
2006	La radice del male		"The Root of Evil" (direct-to-video)
2012	Líbáš jako ďábel	Puppa	"You Kiss Like a Devil"

Television
Year	Title	Role	Notes
1984	Této noci v tomto vlaku	Marie	TV movie
1990	Hansel e Gretel	Woman in Bath (uncredited)	TV movie; "Hansel and Gretel"
1991	L'ispettore Sarti - Un poliziotto, una città	Claudia	Season 1, Episode 8
2001	Resurrezione		TV movie; "Resurrection"
