= Cat in the Brain =

1990 film directed by Lucio Fulci

- Italian theatrical release poster by Enzo Sciotti
- Directed by: Lucio Fulci
- Screenplay by: Lucio Fulci; John Fitzsimmons
- Story by: Lucio Fulci; John Fitzsimmons
- Produced by: Luigi Nannerini; Anthony Lucidi
- Starring: Lucio Fulci; Jeoffre Kenedy; Malisa Longo; David L. Thompson
- Cinematography: Alessandro Grossi
- Edited by: Vincenzo Tomassi
- Music by: Fabio Frizzi
- Production company: Exclusive Cine TV Srl.
- Distributed by: Lucas Film
- Release date: August 10, 1990 (Rome)
- Running time: 89 minutes
- Country: Italy
- Language: Italian

Cat in the Brain (Italian: Un gatto nel cervello (I volti del terrore), lit. 'A Cat in the Brain (The Faces of Terror)') is a 1990 Italian horror film written and directed by Lucio Fulci. Fulci stars as a fictionalized version of himself, a tortured horror filmmaker who is driven by the violent visions that he experiences both behind the camera and off the set. Feeling like he's losing his grip on reality and disturbed by murderous fantasies, Fulci consults a psychotherapist, who is secretly a serial killer and using hypnosis, exploiting the director's vulnerabilities to his own murderous ends.

A Cat in the Brain has been called the horror film equivalent of Federico Fellini's 8½, using cynical, Grand Guignol humour. Juxtaposing gory horror clips from several of his own past horror films which he had worked on, Fulci shot a wrap-around segment featuring his own plot and used Vincenzo Tomassi's film editing to create the storyline – a personal insight into the effects of horror filmmaking on the psyche.

== Plot ==
Dr. Lucio Fulci is a former medical doctor-turned director of gory horror films. He wraps up shooting for the day on his latest film, Touch of Death. Fulci leaves the Cinecittà Studios for a local restaurant down the street. The waiter recognizes him and suggests his typical meal. Fulci cannot look at the sample plates of meat without having flashbacks to the cannibalistic scene he'd been filming earlier. Shaken, he leaves the restaurant without ordering. Later, while checking special effects from another movie, Fulci irritably snaps at a technician to get a plate of animal eyeballs out of his sight.

Returning home to his row house in an old suburb of Rome, the troubled director tries to sleep, but the noise of a handyman's chainsaw outside keeps him awake with recollections of his own recently shot chainsaw mayhem. In a rage, Fulci storms outside and smashes a hatchet into cans of paint belonging to the handyman. Fulci goes to see a psychiatrist, professor Egon Schwarz who accepts Fulci into his books for a session. Schwarz discusses Fulci's recent problems and suggests that he's "breaking down the barrier, the boundary between what you film and what's real."

Fulci is revealed to be making two films simultaneously: The Touch of Death and Ghosts of Sodom. After Fulci leaves the set, his producer steers him into a studio suite for an interview with a Munich news crew. The sight of the tall, blond, German lady reporter's long legs triggers a vision of sexual abandon in Nazi Germany (from the film Ghosts of Sodom). When Fulci recovers from his vision, Filippo then informs the confused director that he has just run amok, smashed the TV crew's camera, and tried to rip the interviewer's clothes off.

Professor Schwarz calls Fulci for another consultation after he had watched all of his films. He suggests using hypnosis. Once Fulci is under, the Professor's true colors are revealed. He switches on a buzzer device and describes a mad scheme: "You'll do everything I tell you when you hear this sound. You will slowly be possessed by madness. You'll think you've committed terrible crimes." After the session is over, Fulci leaves, unable to remember anything. Schwarz then embarks on a killing spree, starting with the murder of a local prostitute that evening. Fulci arrives on the scene and thinks he committed the murder.

Back home the following morning, Fulci is plagued with visions of violence from his movies. He goes for a drive, but Schwarz follows him and commits more murders, again Fulci thinks he committed them. Fulci hallucinates running over a tramp (from the movie Touch of Death). After returning home, he phones the police station to speak to his friend Inspector Gabrielli, intending to make a "confession." But learns that Gabrielli is on vacation.

After another visit to Professor Schwarz is of little help, Fulci decides to drive over to Inspector Gabrielli's house in the hope of speaking to him. Schwarz follows him there with the buzzer device. Fulci lets himself into the house, and immediately suffers from visions of Gabrielle's family being murdered. Fulci staggers outside to be greeted by the returning Gabrielle, when Fulci expresses his visions to him he reassures the director that his family are safely on holiday in Sardinia.

Meanwhile, Professor Schwarz murders his wife with piano wire. Schwarz then follows Fulci, who, again under the influence of hypnosis, has more visions of violent imagery and faints in the middle of a field. He comes round the next morning to discover a cat digging up the loosely buried remains of another Schwarz victim. As Fulci scrapes soil from the dead features, Inspector Gabrielli appears behind him. Before Fulci can protest his innocence, Gabrielli informs him that Schwarz has been shot dead by his men who were tailing Fulci which he ordered after their conversation the previous day, who caught the mad psychiatrist in the act.

Several months later, Fulci and Nurse Lilly sail on his sailboat, Perversion (named after his movie). Fulci follows the young nurse into the cabin-quarters. Suddenly, the sound of a chainsaw revs up, followed by her screams. Fulci emerges from the cabin with a basket of her body parts and attaches them onto fishing hooks. Just when it appears that Fulci is a crazed killer after all, it is revealed that it's the end of his latest movie, Nightmare Concert, captured by a film crew in another boat sailing alongside. Bidding goodbye to his colleagues, Fulci happily sails out of the harbor with his very-much-alive leading lady.

=== Alternative ending ===
An alternate ending added by the Italian distributor to the Italian language print ends with a bloodcurdling scream from below deck dubbed onto the soundtrack after Fulci and the girl sail away from the dock, hinting that Fulci was a maniacal killer.

== Cast ==
- Lucio Fulci as Dr. Lucio Fulci
- David I. Thompson as Professor Egon Swharz
- Jeoffre Kenedy as Gabrielli, the policeman
- Malisa Longo as Katya Schwart
- Shillet Angel as Filippo, the producer
- Judi Morrow as Lilly, the nurse

The film also features footage from several other films, which includes footage of actors Brett Halsey and Ria De Simone in Touch of Death.

== Production ==
Cat in the Brain was filmed on location at the Petrini Marina at the "Piazza Vecchia" restaurant and on a yacht. Interiors were shot at Cinecittà Studios in Rome.

The film uses footage from several of Fulci's recent productions, including Touch of Death, Sodoma's Ghost as well the work of other directors such as Andrea Bianchi's Massacre, Leandro Lucchetti's Bloody Psycho, Umberto Lenzi's The Hell's Gate, Giovanni Simonelli's Hansel & Gretel, Mario Bianchi's The Murder Secret, and Enzo Millioni's Luna di sangue.

== Release ==
Cat in the Brain was released theatrically in Italy as Un gatto nel cervello (I volti dei terrore). It was distributed theatrically in Rome by Lucas Film on August 10, 1990 with an 89 minute running time.

The theatrical version of the film was released in the US and Japan on LaserDisc in the late 1990s. The uncut, uncensored director's cut of the film was released in North America for the first time on VHS and DVD by Image Entertainment in 2001 (in very limited quantities) as a part of "The Euroshock Collection", then reissued on 31 March 2009 by Grindhouse Releasing on the Ryko/Warner Brothers label.

In 2016, Grindhouse Releasing released the uncensored director's cut of the film on Blu-ray.

== Reception ==
Nicholas Bell of Ioncinema gave the film a score of 1½ out of 5 and wrote, "Whether you're grimacing or giggling, Cat in the Brain isn't entirely void of entertainment value, and it is sort of enhanced by a meta examination of the effects of graphic violence on the minds of its own makers. But then, the extreme lack of subtlety in every possible regard doesn't make this reason enough to champion the film or point to any sort of psychological finesse." Martin Unsworth, in a review written for Starburst magazine, opined that Cat in the Brain was far from Fulci's best film and that its attempts at social commentary were overshadowed by its blending of "cod-giallo and splatter, albeit with a sense of humour" but still felt that Cat in the Brain had "enough going for it to merit interest" for those who "enjoyed the late Italian's work."
