= The New York Ripper =

1982 film by Lucio Fulci

- Theatrical release poster by Enzo Sciotti
- Italian: Lo squartatore di New York
- Directed by: Lucio Fulci
- Screenplay by: Gianfranco Clerici; Vincenzo Mannino; Lucio Fulci; Dardano Sacchetti
- Story by: Gianfranco Clerici; Vincenzo Mannino; Lucio Fulci
- Produced by: Fabrizio De Angelis
- Starring: Jack Hedley; Almanta Keller; Howard Ross; Andrew Painter; Alexandra Delli Colli; Paolo Malco
- Cinematography: Luigi Kuveiller
- Edited by: Vincenzo Tomassi
- Music by: Francesco De Masi
- Production company: Fulvia Film
- Distributed by: 77 Cinematografica
- Release date: 4 March 1982
- Running time: 93 minutes
- Country: Italy
- Box office: ₤1.04 billion

The New York Ripper (Italian: Lo squartatore di New York) is a 1982 Italian giallo slasher film directed by Lucio Fulci, who co-wrote the screenplay with Gianfranco Clerici, Vincenzo Mannino, and Dardano Sacchetti. It stars Jack Hedley, Almanta Suska, Howard Ross, Andrea Occhipinti, Alexandra Delli Colli and Paolo Malco. The film is about a police lieutenant who is tracking a sadistic serial killer who slashes women with a switchblade and straight-razors across New York City.

Shot in late August to October 1981 in New York with interiors being shot in Italy, the script was re-written by Sacchetti at the last moment prior to filming. It was released in 1982 in Italy and later in the United States in 1984 while being banned in the United Kingdom until 2002.

== Plot ==
A decomposed human hand is found in New York City, which the police identify as belonging to a model, Ann Linn. Lieutenant Fred Williams, the burned-out police detective investigating the murder, interviews Ann's nosy landlady, Mrs. Weissburger. She reveals that she overheard a phone call in which Ann arranged to meet someone speaking in a strange, duck-like voice.

On the Staten Island Ferry, a young woman is eviscerated by an unseen assailant. The pathologist conducting the autopsy tells Williams that the killer is left-handed and employed the same technique that was used to murder Ann. Williams tells the press about a potential serial killer on the loose. The chief of police, fearful of a citywide panic, forbids him from further public announcements. Williams hires psychotherapist Dr. Paul Davis to advise on the case.

That night in New York's red-light district, Jane Lodge attends a live sex show and records the two performers' simulated moans with a pocket tape recorder. She is closely observed from a nearby chair by Mickey Scellenda, a scruffy, dangerous-looking man with two missing fingers. After the show, the killer murders the female performer in her dressing room by stabbing her in the groin with a broken bottle. Later that night, at the apartment of Kitty, a prostitute he patronizes, Williams receives a taunting phone call from the duck-voiced killer announcing his latest murder.

A young woman, Fay Majors, is accosted by Scellenda on the subway and escapes into a seedy district. The unseen duck-voiced killer ambushes her and inflicts a deep wound to her leg. She flees into an empty cinema, where she hallucinates a young man repeatedly attacking her with a straight razor. She wakes up from her nightmare in a hospital, where her leg wound is being tended to. Her boyfriend Peter pays a visit, and laughs when she recounts that he tried to kill her in her nightmare. Fay tells Williams that she suspects her duck-voiced attacker and her subway stalker are the same person, and describes the latter's missing fingers.

Jane, who has an open marriage with her wealthy husband, continues to prowl New York for sexual experiences. After being subjected to sexual humiliation by two young men in a bar, she picks up Scellenda and they engage in BDSM in a sleazy hotel. While he is asleep, Jane listens to a radio DJ announcing that the killer, now dubbed the "New York Ripper" by the press, has two missing fingers. In a panic, Jane slips from the room only to be killed by the Ripper in the hotel hallway.

Williams identifies Scellenda as the man with the missing fingers—a Greek immigrant with a history of sexual assault and drug abuse. Although Dr. Davis doubts that Scellenda is intelligent enough to be their killer, his concerns seem obviated when Scellenda assaults Fay in her home before being chased off by Peter. Days later, Williams receives a mocking phone call from the Ripper about an impending victim. After being delayed by a false lead, Williams realizes the Ripper's target is Kitty but arrives too late to prevent her gruesome murder.

Scellenda is found dead and the autopsy reveals he killed himself days before Kitty's murder, ruling him out as the Ripper. Dr. Davis completes a profile of the killer: an intelligent young person who hates young, sexually active women and shadowed Scellenda to identify potential victims and frame him for murder. Knowing Fay's and Peter's high IQ, Williams and Davis investigate the couple and discover Suzy, Peter's terminally ill daughter from a previous relationship. This strengthens their suspicion that Fay, Peter or both are hiding something, and they rush to their house to arrest them.

Meanwhile, Fay correctly guesses Peter's identity as the Ripper and a fight ensues between them. Williams and Davis arrive just as Peter is about to kill Fay; Williams shoots Peter in the face, killing him. Davis comforts Fay and explains that Peter resented her and other women for enjoying a life that his daughter never would. Suzy attempts to call Peter from her hospital room, to no avail.

== Cast ==
- Jack Hedley as Lieutenant Fred Williams
- Almanta Suska (credited as Almanta Keller) as Fay Majors
- Howard Ross as Mikis "Mickey" Scellenda
- Andrea Occhipinti (credited as Andrew Painter) as Peter Bunch
- Alexandra Delli Colli as Jane Lodge
- Paolo Malco as Dr. Paul Davis
- Cinzia de Ponti as Rosie, the ferry victim
- Cosimo Cinieri (credited as Laurence Welles) as Dr. Lodge
- Daniela Doria as Kitty
- Babette New as Mrs. Weissburger
- Zora Kerova (credited as Zora Kerowa) as Eva, a sex show performer
- Antone Pagán (credited as Anthon Kagan) as Morales
- Josh Cruze as Chico
- Giordano Falzoni as Dr. Barry Jones, a coroner
- Lucio Fulci as the chief of police
- Barbara Cupisti as Heather
- Chiara Ferrari as Susy Bunch
- Urs Althaus as male sex show performer (uncredited)
- Michele Soavi as man buying newspaper (uncredited)

== Production ==
=== Development and writing ===
Producer Fabrizio De Angelis was not content with the script provided by Gianfranco Clerici and Vincenzo Mannino and had Dardano Sacchetti rewrite the script. According to Sacchetti, De Angelis claimed the film to be modelled after The Hunger (1983), which is impossible as the film came out after Fulci's film was completed. Sacchetti stated that the film had initially involved a murderer suffering from progeria, that it was "a meditation on old age and human decadence. Fulci didn't understand it", and that Sacchetti had to re-do "the script in five days, not working on the structure or plot but on the situations, that is, the death scenes and the giallo mechanisms." Sacchetti added that much of the film's sexual content came from Fulci, claiming that Fulci "nurtures a profound sadism towards women."

Clerici and Mannino later retooled their original concept into the film Phantom of Death.

=== Casting ===
Among the cast was English actor Jack Hedley, who was cast after filming had already commenced. Even though he spoke all his lines in English, Hedley's voice was dubbed by Edward Mannix, because the filmmakers were unhappy with his American accent.

Zora Kerova, who played Eva in the film, spoke positively about working with Fulci and stated that it took a while for Fulci to warm up to her. When asked what she thought of the film, she stated she "didn't like The New York Ripper at all."

=== Filming ===
The New York Ripper was shot in eight weeks from late August to October 1981 under the working title of Lo squartatore (lit. 'The Ripper'). It was shot on location in New York, with interiors filmed at INCIR De Paolis Studios in Rome. Filming locations included the Staten Island Ferry, Columbia University, Times Square, and Memorial Sloan Kettering Cancer Center.

Prior to the release of the film, Fulci discussed the production, describing it as "much less horror than my previous films, no zombies, but a human killer working in the dark." Fulci described the film as a tribute to Alfred Hitchcock, billing it as "Hitchcock Revisited, a fantastic film with a plot, violence and sexuality."

== Release ==
The New York Ripper was released on 4 March 1982 in Italy. It grossed 1,039,731,282 Italian lire (equivalent to about $760,000 U.S. dollars or about ₤460,000 British pounds in 1982) during its original theatrical run, and found similar commercial success abroad.

In the United Kingdom, the film was screened for the British Board of Film Classification (BBFC), with Carol Tpolski describing the film as "simply the most damaging film I have ever seen in my whole life" and "a relentless catalogue of the eponymous antihero/villain cutting women up." The film was banned in the United Kingdom, where it could not be sold until 2002.

The film received a limited theatrical release in the United States in 1984 and was released on VHS in 1987, where it was slightly edited by Vidmark Entertainment. It was released on 7 September 1999 by Anchor Bay Entertainment on DVD and later on by Blue Underground on Blu-ray and DVD in 2016. It received a 4K scan Blu-ray Release in 2019 and finally a Special Edition 4K release in August 2020.

== Reception ==
From reviews in the 1980s, critic Alan Jones stated in a 1983 issue of Starburst that the film was a "psychotic, erotic masterpiece" and "the strongest and most powerful of all [of Fulci's] films to date", concluding that the film "clinches his position as one of the most influential directors of the past decade". Jones continued that the film captured the sleaziness of New York to perfection, Fulci's sense of ironic humor, declaring the only faults were that the passage of time within sections of the film is unclear, and that the motive for the murders was "a trifle thin". In an overview of Fulci's career in 1989, Chas. Balun wrote in GoreZone that The New York Ripper was "justifiably overlooked" stating that "one can almost summarily dismiss the clunky plotting, regressive world view, mean-spirited misogyny and sleazy sexual sadism, but no one can let Fulci off the hook for featuring a psychopathic killer who quacks like a duck!"

Eric Henderson of Slant Magazine called the film "sour and pointless", adding that it "utilizes all the necessary ingredients but fails to summon from them the magisterial dignity one expects from the finer NYC vomitoriums". On his website, Fantastic Movie Musings and Ramblings, Dave Sindelar criticized the film's clichéd plot, obvious identity of the killer and attempts at pathos, the latter of which he felt were "forced and ineffectual". In the end, Sindelar stated that the film's nastiness and gore were its primary appeal, while also noting that it "will certainly not be to everyone’s taste". Maitland McDonagh from TV Guide gave the film one out of four stars, writing, "Fulci alternates sleazy sex scenes with graphic and deeply misogynistic murders, fills the plots with twists that make no sense, then wraps the whole thing up in a preposterous psychological flourish". Robert Firsching of AllMovie felt that the film was Fulci "pandering to the lowest common denominator as never before in his career". He added that "Fulci showed with this blatant play for the sicko slasher crowd that the days of well-plotted, stylish Italian horror were gone, replaced with the most vicious sort of sexual violence and perversion", concluding that the film was a "shameful piece of work".

On the review aggregator website Rotten Tomatoes, The New York Ripper holds an approval rating of 25% based on eight reviews.
