= La moglie in bianco... l'amante al pepe =

1980 film by Michele Massimo Tarantini

- Italian theatrical release poster by Enzo Sciotti
- Directed by: Michele Massimo Tarantini
- Produced by: Luciano Martino
- Cinematography: Raúl Pérez Cubero
- Music by: Sereno De Sutti
- Release date: 1980
- Language: Italian

La moglie in bianco... l'amante al pepe is a 1980 commedia sexy all'italiana directed by Michele Massimo Tarantini.

== Plot ==
Gianluca, the son of the dentist Baron Peppino Patané, performs unmanly attitudes. The old grandfather Calogero, shortly before his death, makes it a condition to the heritage collection Gianluca's marriage and, above all, the quick birth of a son. After a series of bawdy adventures, Gianluca marries a former stripper and becomes a father.

== Cast ==
- Lino Banfi: Giuseppe 'Peppino' Patanè / Calogero Patanè
- Pamela Prati: Sonia
- Marisa Porcel: Maria, wife of Peppino
- Javier Viñas: Gianluca
- Raf Baldassarre: Cosimo Mancuso
- Susan Scott: Lia, wife of Cosimo
- Ria De Simone: Linda
