= La professoressa di scienze naturali =

1976 film by Michele Massimo Tarantini

- Italian theatrical release poster by Enzo Sciotti
- Directed by: Michele Massimo Tarantini
- Written by: Francesco Milizia; Marino Onorati; Marino Girolami; Aldo Grimaldi; Mauro Ivaldi
- Starring: Lilli Carati
- Cinematography: Daniele Alabiso
- Music by: Alessandro Alessandroni
- Release date: 1976
- Country: Italy
- Language: Italian

La professoressa di scienze naturali (lit. The Natural Sciences Professor/teacher (feminine)) is a 1976 commedia sexy all'italiana directed by Michele Massimo Tarantini. The film is known in English as School Days.

== Plot ==
The plot evolves around a Sicilian liceo (high school) Science teacher, Stefania (Lilli Carati), who is the target of various men's amorous efforts.

== Cast ==
- Lilli Carati: Stefania Marini
- Michele Gammino: Baron Fifì Cacciapupolo
- Giacomo Rizzo: prof. Straziota
- Alvaro Vitali: Peppino Cariglia
- Ria De Simone: Immacolata
- Gianfranco Barra: preside
- Marco Gelardini: Andrea Balsamo
- Gastone Pescucci: Nicola Balsamo
- Gianfranco D'Angelo: Genesio
- Mario Carotenuto: Don Antonio

== See also ==
- List of Italian films of 1976
