= List of works rejected by the British Board of Film Classification =

Works refused certification by the British Board of Film Classification (BBFC)

The following is a list of works submitted for certification to the British Board of Film Classification (BBFC) that were not immediately or, in some cases, ever granted a certificate due to them being unsuitable for classification.

Since its inception in 1912, the BBFC's duty has been to classify films, television programmes, video games, advertisements and other visual media according to their content. If a work is deemed unacceptable by the BBFC according to their guidelines or potentially illegal under British law, they can choose to refuse a certificate for that work. Although these works can be shown in cinemas with the permission of local councils, they cannot legally be sold on home video. Online streaming platforms are not required to have their content certified by the BBFC, though many do.

Over the years, several works have been refused a certificate, in effect banning them. Some of these works were later classified uncut, some were cut to meet the BBFC's guidelines, and some have never been granted a certificate.

== Works rejected, later classified uncut ==
Work	Date rejected	Date certificate granted	Current certificate	Details	Sources
A Woman (Note: Originally passed under the title Charlie, the Perfect Lady.)	8 January 1915	10 September 1915	U (Note: First passed with cuts, which were waived on 12 May 1994.)		
Nosferatu (Note: Rejected under the title Dracula.)	11 December 1922	10 October 1973	PG (Note: First passed A; passed PG on 9 November 1992.)		
Battleship Potemkin (Note: Also submitted under the titles Potemkin, under which it was rejected, and The Battleship Potemkin.)	30 September 1926	11 January 1954	12 (Note: First passed X; updated to PG on 16 November 1987. On 8 July 2025, the cinema rating was raised to 12A, with the home media rating subsequently being updated to 12 on 17 July.)	Rejected for "inflammatory subtitles and Bolshevist Proaganda [sic]." Unbanned as the now niche status of silent films and the death of Joseph Stalin were seen as diminishing the film's likelihood of causing political unrest.	
Outside the Law	25 March 1927	15 January 1931	12 (Note: First passed A; passed 12 on 13 June 2022.)		
You Can't Beat the Law	9 May 1928	11 January 1944	U		
The Racketeer (Note: Also passed under the title Love's Conquest.)	19 December 1929	20 May 1930	U (Note: First passed A; passed U on 3 February 2005.)		
Party Girl	7 February 1930	4 June 2003	PG		
Storm over Asia	c. 25 February 1930	2 March 1989	PG	This Soviet film about a fictitious British occupation of Mongolia was rejected "on the ground that the film is provocative of or likely to cause a breach of the peace" as well as due to its portrayal of the British Army.	
The New Babylon	c. 9 March 1930	23 June 1982	U		
Liliom	29 September 1930	22 January 2010	PG	The film's depiction of the afterlife was deemed "irreverent, if not actually blasphemous."	
An American Tragedy	15 September 1931	11 December 2023	PG		
The Miracle Woman	26 October 1931	14 October 2024	12		
Morals for Women (Note: Passed with cuts under the title Big City Interlude and uncut as Farewell Party.)	31 December 1931	9 April 1935	A (Note: First passed with cuts, which were waived on 12 July 1935.)		
Freaks	1 July 1932	9 May 1963	12 (Note: First passed X; updated to 15 for home media on 11 January 1995. On 13 August 2001, the film was passed 12 for cinema release, but remained 15 on home media until 16 August 2023.)	Rejected twice, the second time on 12 March 1952, due to the perceived exploitation of physically disabled people.	
L'Opéra de quat'sous	23 August 1932	26 August 1998	PG		
The Monster Walks	24 August 1932	9 November 2010	PG		
The Face on the Barroom Floor	3 February 1933	11 December 1933	A		
Island of Lost Souls	13 March 1933	9 July 1958	PG (Note: First passed X with cuts; passed 12 uncut on 10 May 1996, which was lowered to PG on 1 August 2011.)		
The Deserter	21 November 1933	29 December 1941	A		
Court Waltzes (Note: Rejected under the French title La guerre des valses.)	26 January 1934	23 June 1937	U		
Elysia	24 April 1934	10 July 1958	A (obsolete) (Note: The A and X ratings were both retired in 1982, and this film has not been resubmitted since then. The BBFC have stated that films last classified under the pre-1982 system must be resubmitted before being reissued, unless permission to screen the film from the local council is granted, effectively rendering this film unrated.)	This docudrama about nudist camps was subsequently rejected on 31 January 1949 and 7 January 1958 before finally being granted an A certificate.	
Black Moon	2 September 1934	21 October 2024	12		
Le Grand Jeu	4 September 1934	5 May 2010	PG		
Death Day	6 February 1935	27 April 1939	A		
Club de Femmes	3 July 1936	25 October 2000	12		
I Was a Captive of Nazi Germany	26 May 1939	12 September 1939	A		
The Mad Monster	29 July 1942	10 January 1952	X (obsolete)		
The Miracle	7 May 1949	15 January 1951	PG (Note: First passed X; passed PG as part of the anthology film L'amore on 26 January 2015.)		
Manon	c. 29 September 1949	15 January 1951	12 (Note: First passed X; passed 12 on 16 January 2020.)		
The Hitch-Hiker	2 February 1953	30 April 1953	12 (Note: First passed X with cuts; passed 12 uncut on 4 February 2005.)		
The Wild One	18 January 1954	21 November 1967	PG (Note: First passed X; passed PG on 25 July 1988.)	Rejected a second time on 20 December 1955. According to the BBFC, "The initial ban was prompted mostly by a fear that the very real problem of burgeoning juvenile delinquency, and a seemingly increasing lack of respect for authority, could only be aggravated by young people seeing this film."	
Riot in Cell Block 11	5 March 1954	3 September 1954	15 (Note: First passed X with cuts; passed 15 uncut on 1 September 1985.)		
Black Tuesday	28 October 1954	7 August 1955	12 (Note: First passed X with cuts; passed 12 uncut on 18 November 2024.)		
Garden of Eden	4 January 1955	10 July 1958	A		
Blackboard Jungle	15 March 1955	15 August 1955	12 (Note: First passed X with cuts; passed 12 uncut on 28 June 1996.)	Regarding the rejections of this film and The Wild One, the BBFC stated "Having regard to the present widespread concern about the increase in juvenile crime, the board is not prepared to pass any film dealing with the subject unless the compensating moral values are so firmly presented as to justify exhibition to audiences likely to contain (even with an "X" certificate) a large percentage of young and immature persons."	
Wrestling Knights	13 September 1957	21 December 1960	U		
Glen or Glenda	26 February 1958	18 January 1995	15		
Goodnight With Sabrina	20 August 1959	14 March 2016	15		
Horrors of Spider Island	1 September 1960	9 November 2010	12		
Naked Youth	5 September 1960	30 January 2008	15		
West End Jungle	1 February 1961	10 November 2008	15		
Black Sunday (Note: Also passed under the titles Revenge of the Vampire and The Mask of Satan.)	10 February 1961	15 May 1968	15 (Note: First passed X with cuts; passed 15 on 17 April 1986.)		
Mr. Sardonicus	22 August 1961	13 December 1961	12 (Note: First passed X; passed 12 on 25 October 1996.)		
The Immoral Mr. Teas	3 July 1962	9 October 1987	18		
Shock Corridor	2 October 1963	31 December 1990	15	Rejected two more times in 1966 and 1968.	
Promises! Promises!	22 October 1963	16 August 2011	15	Rejected a second time on 4 September 1967.	
The Naked Kiss	13 March 1964	31 December 1990	18	The BBFC rejected this film twice, but it was passed by the Berkshire County Council and the Greater London Council.	
Lady in a Cage	8 April 1964	17 November 2000	15 (Note: First passed 18; lowered to 15 on 24 May 2005.)		
The Sadist	15 May 1964	19 May 1999	15		
The Horror of Party Beach	20 May 1964	27 August 1964	12 (Note: First passed X with cuts; passed 12 uncut on 3 December 2004.)		
Carousella	28 January 1965	30 April 2009	15		
Lorna	2 February 1965	18 February 1998	18		
Onibaba	26 August 1965	15 June 1968	15 (Note: First passed X with cuts; passed 15 uncut on 10 March 1994.)		
Who Killed Teddy Bear	11 October 1965	9 July 2008	15		
Trans-Europ-Express	1966	17 January 1977	15 (Note: First passed X; passed 15 on 15 October 2013.)	The distributor held a private screening for then-Secretary of the BBFC John Trevelyan, who stated that the film's depictions of sexual sadism would have to be cut, and that "This kind of sexual perversion is a dangerous one and I am sure we would not pass anything that might stimulate a pervert of that kind." The film was reportedly rejected upon its subsequent formal submission, though no record of this exists in the BBFC's database.	
The Wild Angels	6 December 1966	28 September 1972	15 (Note: First passed X with cuts; passed 18 uncut on 21 July 1993, which was lowered to 15 on 13 August 2008.)		
Django	23 May 1967	16 February 1993	15 (Note: First passed 18; rating lowered to 15 on 23 March 2004.)	Rejected due to excessive violence that could not be cut for an X rating.	
Common-Law Cabin (Note: Rejected under the title How Much Loving Does a Normal Couple Need?; all subsequent submissions use the title Common-Law Cabin.)	1 August 1967	9 October 1987	18		
The Trip	5 September 1967	21 November 2002	18	This film depicting a young man's first LSD trip was rejected four more times in 1971, 1980, 1983 and 1988 due to its perceived glamorisation of drug use.	
Mermaids of Tiburon (Note: Also submitted under the title Aquasex.)	12 September 1967	20 December 1968	15 (Note: First passed A with cuts; passed 15 uncut on 15 November 2011.)	Alternate version of a 1962 film, featuring newly-shot nude footage.	
Hells Angels on Wheels	28 September 1967	11 May 1977	15 (Note: First passed X with cuts; passed 18 with cuts on 14 November 1988, before being passed 15 uncut on 31 January 2006.)		
The Incident	19 January 1968	14 March 2014	12		
Gate of Flesh	29 January 1968	2 October 2000	18		
Weekend	c. 26 March 1969	10 June 1969	18 (Note: First passed X; passed 18 on 7 February 1991.)		
Love Variations	13 April 1970	4 November 1970	18 (Note: First passed X; passed 18 on 14 September 1995.)		
Bloody Mama	28 April 1970	19 February 1971	18 (Note: First passed X with cuts; passed 18 with cuts on 1 October 1986; passed 18 uncut on 1 April 2009.)		
Top Sensation	13 April 1970	11 May 2016	18		
Quiet Days in Clichy	15 October 1970	18 December 2002	18		
Language of Love	26 October 1970	27 July 1973	18 (Note: First passed X; passed 18 on 26 February 1988.)	Between its rejection and certification by the BBFC, the film was passed by the Greater London Council.	
Daddy, Darling	20 November 1970	10 July 1973	X (obsolete)		
A Girl Called Jules	10 March 1971	12 May 1975	X (obsolete)		
Virgin Witch	22 April 1971	7 January 1972	18 (Note: First passed X with cuts; passed 18 uncut on 26 October 1983.)		
Kiss Me Quick!	17 May 1971	2 March 2012	18		
The Panic in Needle Park	16 June 1971	21 November 1974	18 (Note: First passed X; passed 18 with cuts on 31 December 1987; passed 18 uncut on 4 April 2002.)		
The Strange Vice of Mrs. Wardh	14 July 1971	8 February 2011	18		
Trash	4 August 1971	9 November 1972	18 (Note: First passed X with cuts; passed 18 with cuts on 19 June 1991; passed 18 uncut on 6 June 2005.)		
The Big Doll House	1 September 1971	15 May 1997	18 (Note: First passed with cuts, which were waived on 18 August 2003.)		
The Demons (Note: Also passed under the Spanish title Las Poseidas del Demonio.)	23 March 1972	25 July 2008	18		
The Iguana with the Tongue of Fire	24 March 1972	25 January 2019	15		
A Bay of Blood	6 April 1972	23 January 1980	18 (Note: First passed X under the title Bloodbath; passed 18 with cuts on 18 March 1994; cuts waived on 31 August 2010.)		
The Abductors	16 May 1972	6 February 1974	18 (Note: First passed X with cuts; uncut and cut versions were respectively passed 18 on 11 and 23 March 1983.)		
Sinderella	9 June 1972	13 April 1973	X (obsolete)		
The Lady Hermit	22 June 1972	25 November 2024	15		
Oh! Calcutta!	19 October 1972	18 April 1978	18 (Note: First passed X; passed 18 on 6 October 2008.)		
Mera ur kärlekens språk (Note: Submitted under the English titles More About Language of Love and Language of Love 2.)	27 October 1972	8 February 1983	18 (Note: First passed with cuts, which were waived on 27 July 1987.)		
Mantis in Lace	4 December 1972	14 March 2012	18		
Requiem for a Vampire	6 December 1972	9 June 1993	18 (Note: First passed with cuts, which were waived on 2 December 2024.)		
What Have You Done to Solange? (Note: Rejected under the shorter title Solange.)	23 March 1973	18 January 1996	18 (Note: First passed with cuts, which were waived on 16 October 2015.)		
Sex Adventures of the Three Musketeers	30 August 1973	12 February 1975	X (obsolete)		
The Bloody Fists (Note: Also passed under the title Dragon Showdown.)	30 August 1973	31 August 1976	18 (Note: First passed X with cuts; passed 18 uncut on 10 August 2004.)		
Coffy	5 October 1973	4 April 1974	18 (Note: First passed X with cuts; passed 18 uncut on 19 November 1998.)		
La Grande Bouffe	11 November 1973	27 January 1994	18		
Four Riders	2 January 1974	15 February 1974	15 (Note: First passed X with cuts under the title Hell Fighters of the East; passed 15 uncut on 9 December 2024.)		
Ain't Misbehavin'	19 June 1974	24 March 1976	X (obsolete)		
The Last House on the Left	4 July 1974	17 July 2002	18 (Note: First passed with cuts, which were waived on 17 March 2008.)	Rejected two more times on 15 March 1999 and 1 February 2002.	
Gambling for Head	9 July 1974	10 October 2005	15		
Little Miss Innocence (Note: Passed under the title Teenage Innocence.)	24 July 1974	9 June 1986	18		
Immoral Tales	c. 1974	8 June 1995	18	While no record of the film being rejected could be found on the BBFC's website, their case study for the director's later film The Beast mentions Immoral Tales was "turned away by the BBFC."	
Les Valseuses	24 September 1974	14 January 1992	18		
The Texas Chain Saw Massacre	12 March 1975	16 March 1999	18		
Story of O	27 November 1975	11 February 2000	18		
Salò, or the 120 Days of Sodom	13 January 1976	16 November 2000	18		
The Garden of Torment (Note: Rejected under the title Garden of Torture.)	20 September 1976	24 March 1977	18 (Note: First passed X with cuts; passed 18 uncut c. 2021.)		
The Opening of Misty Beethoven	21 February 1977	25 July 1983	R18 (Note: First passed with cuts, which were waived on 5 October 2005.)		
Desperate Living	17 August 1977	7 September 1990	18 (Note: First passed with cuts, which were waived on 30 May 2026.)		
The Big Racket	21 March 1977	5 December 2002	18 (Note: First passed with cuts, which were waived on 18 April 2022.)		
Jack 'n Jill 2 (Note: Rejected under the title Desires of a Naughty Nympho.)	6 September 1985	26 September 1988	R18		
Island of Death	15 April 1987	1 July 2002	18 (Note: First passed 18 with cuts, which were waived on 23 September 2010.)	Prior to being rejected for home video release, the film was passed X with cuts for cinema release on 13 April 1976, under the titles Devils in Mykonos and A Craving for Lust.	
Late Night Trains (Note: Passed under the title Night Train Murders.)	26 July 1976	14 January 2008	18		
Je t'aime moi non plus	13 September 1976	8 July 1993	18		
Maîtresse	14 October 1976	5 February 1981	18 (Note: First passed X with cuts; passed 18 uncut on 28 May 2003.)		
Ilsa, Harem Keeper of the Oil Sheiks	26 August 1977	14 August 2013	18		
La Bête	25 February 1978	6 June 1988	18 (Note: First passed in the form of a heavily precut version under the title Death's Ecstacy; the uncut version was classified on 1 February 2001.)	The BBFC's issues with this film about the relationship between a human woman and a monster included the perceived theme of bestiality.	
Derek and Clive Get the Horn	21 October 1980	13 August 1993	18		
Mother's Day	10 December 1980	26 January 2015	18		
The House on the Edge of the Park	16 March 1981	1 July 2002	18 (Note: First passed with cuts; passed uncut on 29 April 2022.)		
Maniac	23 July 1981	29 May 2002	18 (Note: First passed with cuts, which were waived on 30 December 2022.)	Rejected a second time on 8 January 1998.	
Savage Streets	14 November 1984	26 June 1987	18 (Note: First passed with cuts, which were waived on 7 April 2011.)	Rejected a second time on 20 May 1986. A trailer for the film was also rejected in 1987.	
Tenement (Note: Rejected under the title Game of Survival.)	16 April 1987	26 August 2005	18		
Butcher, Baker, Nightmare Maker	24 April 1987	26 March 2024	18	Prior to being rejected under the title The Evil Protege, the film was passed 18 uncut on 19 April 1983.	
Class of 1984	22 September 1987	27 May 2005	18	Prior to being rejected for home video release, the film was passed 18 with cuts for cinema release on 22 January 1983.	
Silent Night, Deadly Night Part 2	22 December 1987	25 September 2020	18		
Slumber Party Massacre II	8 December 1988	5 July 2024	15		
Curfew	31 December 1988	13 September 2002	18		
Visions of Ecstasy	18 September 1989	31 January 2012	18	This 19-minute short film featuring sexualised scenes between Teresa of Ávila and the crucified body of Jesus was rejected on the grounds of blasphemy, as cuts would shorten the film by half. Its eventual classification came four years after blasphemy laws in the United Kingdom were repealed.	
Leatherface: The Texas Chainsaw Massacre III	22 May 1990	5 April 2004	18		
International Guerillas	1990	29 August 1990	18	This Pakistani action film was rejected as its antagonistic depiction of writer Salman Rushdie was deemed criminal libel. Rushdie himself opposed the ban, stating "As a writer, I am opposed in principle to the use of the archaic criminal laws of blasphemy, sedition and criminal libel against creative works, even in the case of a film which quite plainly vilifies me", and the film was unbanned following an appeal.	
Back in Action	25 February 1994	14 June 1994	18 (Note: First passed with cuts, which were waived on 5 May 2004.)		
Demoniac	10 August 1994	17 December 2003	18 (Note: First passed with cuts, which were waived on 11 September 2017.)		
Kickboxer 4: The Aggressor	15 August 1994	11 March 2004	18		
Boy Meets Girl	13 September 1995	25 September 2001	18	Passed 18 uncut for cinema release on 27 February 1995, five months before its rejection for home media.	
Mikey	19 December 1996	20 March 2025	15	The classification of this horror film about a nine-year-old serial killer was delayed in light of the 1993 murder of James Bulger by two ten-year-old boys, eventually resulting in its rejection. A trailer for the film was passed 18 prior to the murder.	
Carmageddon	May 1997	c. 4 November 1997	18	This racing video game in which the player can run over pedestrians was reportedly the first video game rejected by the BBFC. After releasing a censored version in which the human pedestrians are replaced with green-blooded zombies, the developer successfully appealed for the uncensored version to be unbanned.	
Deadbeat at Dawn	23 December 1998	29 August 2018	18		
A Cat in the Brain	9 February 1999	26 August 2003	18		
The Classic Films Of Irving Klaw Volume I	9 February 1999	22 January 2010	18	Also titled Betty Page: Bondage Queen. Banned for depiction of bondage.	
Sex Frenzy	3 March 1999	31 July 2000	R18		
Boys Just Wanna Have Fun	3 March 1999	31 July 2000	R18		
Straw Dogs	3 December 1997	27 September 2002	18	The film had previously been passed uncut for cinema release twice; originally at X on 3 November 1971, which was updated to 18 on 20 April 1995. In 1997, the American cut of the film, which was edited to shorten a rape scene, was submitted to the BBFC for home video release; however, the cuts had the side effect of making the victim appear to enjoy being raped, resulting in the film's rejection. The uncut version was subsequently submitted by another distributor, but was also rejected on 1 January 1999 "on the basis that the BBFC could not very well pass a more complete version of the film so soon after rejecting an edited version." In 2002, the BBFC screened the film to leading clinical psychologists specialising in work with sex offenders and separately to a focus group of 26 members of the public; positive responses from both groups to the film's handling of rape helped it to be unbanned.	

== Works rejected, later classified with cuts ==
Work	Date rejected	Date certificate granted	Current certificate	Cut length	Details	Sources
The Battle of Life	12 March 1917	11 March 1932	U			
Irish Destiny (Note: Passed under the title An Irish Mother.)	21 April 1926	8 June 1926	U			
The Ace of Cads	21 March 1927	28 June 1927	A			
Are These Our Children	31 December 1931	27 October 1932	A			
Malay Nights (Note: Passed under the title Shadows of Singapore)	27 February 1933	10 May 1937	A			
Oh, What a Night	1 March 1935	4 March 1935	U			
Professor Mamlock	26 May 1939	14 September 1939	A			
Buried Alive	6 March 1940	28 January 1952	X			
Dédée d'Anvers (Note: Passed under the shortened title Dedee.)	14 April 1949	2 August 1951	X			
Street Corner	26 May 1949	31 December 1952	X			
Sins of the Fathers	7 September 1949	27 May 1952	A			
Cell 2455, Death Row	30 March 1955	5 August 1956	X			
Wicked Woman	11 November 1953	30 May 1960	X			
Cry Vengeance	3 December 1954	19 May 1955	A			
Mad Dog Coll	28 March 1961	8 December 1972	X			
Mondo Cane	30 August 1962	27 November 1963	X			
Sytten (Note: Passed under the English title Seventeen.)	20 September 1966	4 October 1968	X		The BBFC originally wanted to cut scenes of the teenage protagonist ejaculating, a chemist displaying homosexual behaviour, and the protagonist having rear-entry sex with a maidservant, among other minor cuts. While the BBFC ultimately rejected the film, it was passed uncut by the Greater London Council, after which the BBFC passed the film with "not nearly as many [cuts] as those we asked for originally", though the rear-entry scene was still cut.	
Andrea (Note: Also passed under the title The Nympho.)	13 January 1969	16 September 1970	X			
Without a Stitch	14 February 1969	10 February 1975	X			
As the Naked Wind from the Sea (Note: Also passed under the title Sex on the Beach.)	2 April 1969	29 June 1970	18 (Note: First passed X; passed 18 on 27 July 1987.)	~2m 53s		
99 Women	11 April 1969	22 May 2007	18	1m 0s	A scene of a snake being stabbed was required to be cut per the Cinematograph Films (Animals) Act 1937.	
The Born Losers	4 July 1969	17 September 1975	18		Prior to being passed 18 with cuts for home video on 30 July 1987, the film was passed X uncut for cinema.	
Labyrinth of Sex (Note: Rejected under the title Labyrinth of Love.)	19 September 1969	18 September 1970	X			
Venus In Furs	13 January 1970	10 December 1971	18 (Note: First passed X; passed 18 on 15 April 1993.)	1m 0s	In 1993, a lengthy rape scene and a scene of a preteen boy watching a couple having sex through a keyhole were cut. Upon resubmission in 2007, the latter scene was restored due to the boy never appearing in the same frame as the sex, but the former scene, in which the victim eventually comes to enjoy being raped, was still required to be cut.	
Satan's Sadists	18 May 1970	11 July 2003	18	57s	A scene in which a victim appears to enjoy being sexually assaulted was required to be cut.	
Danish Blue	26 January 1971	8 September 1977	X			
Ginger	10 August 1971	22 March 1983	18			
Confessions of a Sixth Form Girl (Note: Rejected under the title Schoolgirl Report.)	15 December 1971	16 July 1976	X			
Blindman	14 February 1972	29 June 1972	X			
Cry Uncle! (Note: Also passed under the titles Super Dick and American Oddballs.)	16 February 1972	27 November 1972	18 (Note: First passed X; passed 18 on 19 August 1987.)			
Stewardess Report (Note: Passed under the title Swinging Stewardesses.)	31 May 1972	29 January 1973	X			
Massage Parlour	26 February 1973	27 July 1973	X			
The Porn-brokers	10 April 1973	29 December 1977	X			
Nurse Report	5 December 1973	4 March 1974	X			
Line Up And Lay Down	7 December 1973	10 May 1974	18 (Note: First passed X; passed 18 on 29 December 1987.)	1m 2s		
Women in Cages	15 December 1972	1986	18	3m 19s		
Sex Farm	5 July 1973	9 August 1976	X			
Love in 3-D	31 January 1974	23 March 1981	X			
Girls are for Loving	5 March 1974	2 January 1977	18 (Note: First passed X; passed 18 on 29 March 1983.)			
Thriller – A Cruel Picture	15 July 1974	1 November 1976	18 (Note: First passed X; passed 18 on 28 July 2025.)		As of 2025, cuts were required to explicit shots of real sex edited into two rape scenes.	
The Case of the Smiling Stiffs	21 August 1974	14 October 1974	X			
Score	20 September 1974	6 December 2012	18	6m 53s (Note: This work was voluntarily cut by the distributor; a higher certificate was available for the uncut version.)	The distributor opted to cut images of unsimulated oral sex to achieve an 18 rating. An uncut R18 was available.	
Wet Dreams (Note: Passed under the title Dreams of Thirteen.)	17 December 1974	15 February 1977	X			
The Dirty Mind of Young Sally	3 January 1975	25 November 1986	18	0m 19s		
Sex Orgy	15 January 1975	2 June 1975	X			
Sexually Yours	12 February 1975	13 May 1975	18 (Note: First passed X; passed 18 on 23 December 2024.)		As of 2024, images deemed to potentially violate the Protection of Children Act 1978 were required to be removed.	
Charlotte (Note: Also submitted under the original French title La jeune fille assassinée.)	25 March 1975	16 March 1976	X (obsolete)			
The Best of the New York Erotic Film Festival	7 April 1975	26 August 1975	18 (Note: First passed X; passed 18 on 31 December 1987.)			
Innocent Girls Abroad	11 June 1975	26 November 1976	X (obsolete)			
Les Bijoux de famille (Note: Passed under the titles Family Jewels, French Blue, Room Service and Games Maids Play.)	2 September 1975	6 January 1976	18 (Note: First passed X; passed 18 on 6 February 1985.)			
Deep River Savages (Note: Rejected under the title The Man From The Deep River, later passed under the original Italian title Il Paese Del Sesso Selvaggio.)	18 September 1975	22 August 2003	18	3m 1s	Multiple scenes of real animal cruelty were required to be cut per the Cinematograph Films (Animals) Act 1937. The same cuts were required when the film was resubmitted in 2016.	
Hot Sex in Bangkok	27 October 1975	9 December 1975	X (obsolete)			
Pussy Talk	6 January 1976	20 July 2000	18		The removal of an eroticised rape within the context of an in-universe pornographic film was required.	
Flossie	5 February 1976	17 March 1977	18 (Note: First passed X; passed 18 under the title Swedish Sex Kitten on 13 August 1987.)			
Stranger from Canton	27 February 1976	28 October 1976	18 (Note: First passed X; passed 18 in 1987.)			
Depraved	31 March 1976	19 July 1976	X (obsolete)			
Caged Women (Note: Also passed under the title Barbed Wire Dolls.)	25 August 1976	14 February 1977	18 (Note: First passed X; passed 18 on 5 March 2004.)	0m 41s	As of 2004, cuts to explicit images of digital penetration were required to achieve an 18 rating. As the film is not considered a sex work, an uncut R18 was not available.	
The Private Afternoons of Pamela Mann (Note: Rejected under the shorter title Pamela.)	26 November 1976	5 October 2005	R18	8m 59s	Eroticised scenes of explicit sexual assault were required to be removed.	
A Private Collection (Note: Rejected under the original French title Une collection particulière.)	22 February 1977	22 February 1977	18 (Note: First passed X; passed 18 c. 2014.)		Two pre-cut versions of this short film were included as bonus features on Arrow Academy's 2014 Blu-ray release of Immoral Tales, a feature by the same director that A Private Collection was originally conceived as a part of. The most explicit images are covered by fingers in the theatrical cut; while these images are uncensored in the "Oberhausen Cut", real footage of bestiality has been blacked out.	
Fantasm	11 May 1977	3 April 1978	18 (Note: First passed X; passed 18 on 12 November 2010.)	8m 0s	As of 2010, two scenes were required to be cut; one features a character reacting positively to being sexually assaulted, while the other includes dialogue deemed "likely to encourage an interest in" incest.	
King Dick	29 November 1977	8 March 1979	X (obsolete)			
Close Encounters of a Handyman	31 May 1978	28 November 1978	X (obsolete)			
Confessions of a Blue Movie Star (Note: Passed under the shorter title Blue Movie Star.)	11 July 1978	19 October 1978	18 (Note: First passed X; passed 18 c. 1986.)			
Love Camp (Note: Rejected under the title Sex in a Woman's Love Camp.)	4 September 1978	11 March 2004	18		A graphic scene of sexual violence was required to be cut.	
Love Letters of a Portuguese Nun	6 February 1979	20 May 2004	18	6m 15s	The distributor was required to cut indecent images of a child per the Protection of Children Act 1978, as well as images of sexualised torture. Both the film itself and a trailer were required to be cut.	
The Red Nights of the Gestapo	6 December 1979	12 March 1981	X (obsolete)			
Secrets of a Nymphomaniac	4 January 1980	5 September 1980	X (obsolete)			
Let Me Die a Woman	21 March 1980	5 May 1982	X (obsolete)			
Escape from Hell (Note: Passed under the titles I'm Coming Your Way, Hell Prison and Sex Slave.)	18 December 1980	11 June 1981	18 (Note: First passed X; passed 18 on 18 July 1986.)			
Screwples	22 December 1982	6 July 1990	18			
The New York Ripper	15 February 1984	21 January 2002	18	0m 29s	Rejected due to concerns the film would violate the Obscene Publications Act 1959. When it was eventually classified, cuts were required to close-up images of a nude, bound woman's breasts and stomach being mutilated with a razor blade. This scene and another in which a woman is stabbed in the groin with a broken bottle were also required to be cut from a trailer for the film.	
Bare Behind Bars	20 September 1994	2 December 2010	18	1m 35s	The distributor chose to cut explicit images of fellatio and vaginal penetration by both penis and dildo to achieve an 18 rating. An uncut R18 was available.	
Sadomania	15 October 1994	16 June 2005	18	17s	Prior to its rejection for home video release, the film was passed X with cuts on 31 March 1982 under the title Prisoners of the Flesh. In 2005, a scene of a pin being inserted into a woman's nipple was required to be cut per guidelines relating to the depiction of sexualised violence.	
Arrowhead	6 October 1995	16 February 1996	R18	1m 20s		
Naked Killer 2	11 August 1997	26 November 1998	18	4m 42s	Rejected a second time on 5 September 1997.	
Nympho Nurse Nancy	c. July 1999	23 May 2000	R18		Prior to the film's rejection, a softcore version was passed 18 with cuts on 8 January 1999.	
T.V. Sex	c. July 1999	23 May 2000	R18		A softcore version was passed 18 with cuts on 26 January 1999.	
Manhunt 2	19 June 2007	14 March 2008	18		The developer produced a censored version of this video game following its rejection. However, this version was also refused a certificate, until the developer successfully appealed for the modified version to be released at 18.	
Bare Scare	25 October 2010	25 October 2010	R18	6m 4s	Cuts were required to a rape fantasy in the context of a sex work.	
The Human Centipede 2 (Full Sequence)	6 June 2011	6 October 2011	18	2m 37s	Rejected due to the film's central focus on "the sexual arousal of the central character at both the idea and the spectacle of the total degradation, humiliation, mutilation, torture, and murder of his naked victims" and the resulting "graphic images of sexual violence, forced defecation, and mutilation" shown from the main character's perspective, all elements stated to be absent from the first film, which was passed 18 uncut. 32 individual cuts were required to graphic images of sexual and sexualised violence, sadistic violence and humiliation, and the killing of a newborn baby.	

== Works rejected, have never been granted a certificate ==
=== 1910s ===
Work	Date rejected	Sources
The Great Physician	21 January 1913	
Interrupted	24 January 1913	
Funnicus the Minister	27 January 1913	
The Good Preceptress	28 January 1913	
The Priest and Peter	6 February 1913	
Mephisto	3 March 1913	
The Night Before	11 March 1913	
Nobody Would Believe	11 March 1913	
Spanish Bull Fight	14 March 1913	
Story of Sister Ruth	11 April 1913	
The Lost Bag	23 May 1913	
His Only Son	30 May 1913	
Frou Frou	14 June 1913	
The Love Adventures of Faublas	19 June 1913	
A Salvage	11 July 1913	
Why Men Leave Home	18 July 1913	
Religion and Superstition in Balochistan	19 September 1913	
The Crimson Cross	8 October 1913	
A Shop Girl's Peril	15 October 1913	
A Snake's Meal	15 October 1913	
Love is Blind	28 October 1913	
La Culotte de Rigadin	5 December 1913	
Miraculous Waters	23 February 1914	
The Word That Kills	25 February 1914	
The Diva in Straits	23 March 1914	
My Wife and I	7 April 1914	
The Blue Room	7 April 1914	
The Last Supper	17 April 1914	
Sins of Your Youth	16 June 1914	
Three Men and a Maid	22 June 1914	
Little White Slaves	3 July 1914	
The Hand That Rules The World	23 July 1914	
Coralie & Co	30 July 1914	
Dealers in Human Lives	18 September 1914	
Pathé Daily Gazette	3 October 1914	
French Fishing Smacks Mount Quick Fires Against the Pirates	12 March 1915	
French Troops Leaving Marseilles for the East	19 March 1915	
Innocent	24 March 1915	
Eclair Journal No.13 1st Edition Armoured Motor Cars	27 March 1915	
Human Wrecks	8 April 1915	
The Inherited Burden	24 May 1915	
Air Raid on London	1 June 1915	
Zeppelins Visit London	1 June 1915	
Eclair Journal No.25 1st Edition - A City Of Fires - Anti German Scenes In Johannesburg	19 June 1915	
Wonderful New Armoured Motor Car That Defies All Attacks	9 July 1915	
Hearts in Exile	9 August 1915	
French Howityers	13 August 1915	
Submarine for England's Navy Launched at Quincy Mass	18 August 1915	
The Lure	30 August 1915	
Pathé Gazette - "Bombing School of the 10th Middlesex"	11 October 1915	
Pathé Gazette - "After an Advance"	12 October 1915	
Pathé Gazette - "Throwing a Grenade"	12 October 1915	
Cupid Arthur & Co	22 November 1915	
Vera	30 December 1915	
The Yoke	31 December 1915	
A Mother's Confession	21 January 1916	
As the Shadow Falls	11 February 1916	
The Fire	11 February 1916	
The Eel	26 February 1916	
The Double Room Mystery	12 March 1916	
Irish Rebels Arrive in London and are Incascerated in Gaol	9 May 1916	
The Unpainted Portrait	10 May 1916	
English Aviator in the Far East	12 May 1916	
English Seaplane at Salonika	12 May 1916	
What the Curate Saw	12 May 1916	
Greed No.14	19 May 1916	
Inspiration	19 May 1916	
Nabbed	19 May 1916	
The Rack	24 May 1916	
The Dragon	31 May 1916	
Toil and Tyranny	31 May 1916	
A Fool There Was	6 June 1916	
A Parisian Romance	20 July 1916	
Those Who Toil	20 July 1916	
A Man Without a Soul	21 July 1916	
A Night Out	8 September 1916	
The Kiss of Hate	22 September 1916	
A Hero of Gallipoli	27 September 1916	
The Wrecked Zeppelin	3 October 1916	
Tanks	14 October 1916	
Glittering Broadway	11 December 1916	
Little Monte Carlo	15 December 1916	
Fear	18 January 1917	
Trapped for Her Dough	18 January 1917	
The Wager	18 January 1917	
Pimple Strafing the Kaiser	3 February 1917	
It May Be Your Daughter	10 February 1917	
The Land of the Forefathers	10 February 1917	
Four Irish Girls	22 February 1917	
The Girl from Chicago	22 February 1917	
Skirts	26 February 1917	
The Whelp	1 March 1917	
The Scarlet Mark	12 March 1917	
Sealed Lips	30 March 1917	
Across No Man's Land with Tanks	23 April 1917	
As Man Made Her	4 May 1917	
The Libertine	9 May 1917	
Hypocrites	18 May 1917	
The Black Terror	12 June 1917	
What Happened at 22	12 June 1917	
The Fourth Estate	14 June 1917	
German Kultuz	16 June 1917	
Under the Bed	18 June 1917	
The Whispered Name	18 June 1917	
A Splendid Waster	12 July 1917	
Arrival of Sinn Féin Prisoners of Dublin	14 July 1917	
Arrival of the Guntess Markeiving on Her Release	14 July 1917	
Four Feathers	3 October 1917	
The Marionettes	29 October 1917	
Conscience	9 November 1917	
Just as He Thought	30 November 1917	
His Model Wife	10 January 1918	
The Zeppelin's Last Raid	20 February 1918	
The Crimson Stain	8 March 1918	
God's Law	24 April 1918	
Honor's Cross	1 August 1918	
Blindfolded	7 August 1918	
The Eagle's Eye	29 October 1918	
The Case of a Doped Actress	11 February 1919	
Free and Equal	25 March 1919	
All Man	30 April 1919	
The Divided Law	13 May 1919	
Her White God	20 May 1919	
Woman, Woman!	20 May 1919	
The Crimson Stain Mystery	3 July 1919	
The One Woman	10 July 1919	
Riders of the Night	9 September 1919	
At the Mercy of Men	18 September 1919	
The Spreading Evil	16 October 1919	
Mother, I Need You	23 October 1919	
Damaged Goods	21 November 1919	

=== 1920s ===
Work	Date rejected	Sources
The Great Shadow	27 May 1920	
Capturing Wild Animals In The Rockies - Nos 1,2,3,4,	22 July 1920	
Capturing Wild Animals In The Wilderness - Nos 1,2,3,4	22 July 1920	
The Women House of Brescia	23 March 1921	
The Price of Youth	24 March 1921	
Beyond the Barricade	15 December 1921	
Greater Than Love	15 December 1921	
Leaves from the Book of Satan	15 December 1921	
Love	15 December 1921	
The New Moon	16 February 1922	
Handcuffs or Kisses	22 February 1922	
Bolshevism on Trial	21 March 1922	
A Bachelor Apartment	24 March 1922	
The Kitchener Film	13 April 1922	
Cocaine	12 May 1922	
A Daughter of the Don	25 September 1922	
A Scream in the Night	5 January 1923	
Children of Destiny	5 January 1923	
Fit to Marry	22 March 1923	
A Royal Bull Fight	24 April 1923	
I Also Accuse	24 April 1923	
Nobody	30 April 1923	
Boston Blackie	27 June 1923	
Animals Like Humans	31 August 1923	
The Bachelor Girl	3 October 1923	
Shootin' for Love	7 December 1923	
A Woman's Fate	14 January 1924	
Human Wreckage	16 January 1924	
Her Dangerous Path Episode 9	21 January 1924	
Through the Dark	11 February 1924	
Getting Strong	25 February 1924	
The Downfall	18 June 1924	
Love and Sacrifice	21 July 1924	
A Truthful Liar	22 October 1924	
The Last Man on Earth	27 November 1924	
Open All Night	27 November 1924	
Grit	11 February 1925	
Battling Bunyan	30 April 1925	
Don't Flirt	14 May 1925	
North of 50-50	14 May 1925	
Our Little Nell	14 May 1925	
The End of the Road	1 October 1925	
The Lawful Cheater	30 November 1925	
The Red Kimono	15 January 1926	
Flying Wheels	8 June 1926	
Rose of the Tenements	10 June 1926	
The Adventures of Mazie: Little Andy Looney	16 July 1926	
The City of Sin	20 September 1926	
Life's Shadows	3 May 1927	
Two-Time Mama	5 May 1927	
Birds of Prey	7 June 1927	
Saltwater Jane	10 June 1927	
The Weavers	25 July 1927	
The White Slave Traffic	25 July 1927	
Plüsch and Plumowski	18 November 1927	
The Haunted Ship	16 February 1928	
Night Life	16 February 1928	
Dawn	1928	
Two's Company	3 August 1928	
Cabaret Nights	10 September 1928	
The Companionate Marriage	29 October 1928	
Mother	6 December 1928	
The Girl from Everywhere	11 December 1928	
Cosmos	c. 10 February 1929	
Casanova's Son	11 February 1929	
The Mysteries of Birth	18 February 1929	
Love at First Flight	20 February 1929	
Below the Deadline	15 September 1929	
The Seashell and the Clergyman	13 November 1929	
Marriage	19 December 1929	

=== 1930s ===
Work	Date rejected	Sources
Parlor Pests	23 January 1930	
Hot Dog	4 March 1930	
Her Unborn Child	10 March 1930	
A Friend of the People	23 April 1930	
The Stronger Sex	29 April 1930	
Possession	29 April 1930	
Ingagi	9 July 1930	
Born Reckless	29 August 1930	
The Sea Wolf	c. 8 October 1930	
Who Killed Rover?	4 November 1930	
Gypsy Code	31 December 1930	
Civilisation	1931	
The Doorway to Hell	9 February 1931	
The Ghost That Never Returns	9 February 1931	
Outward Bound	c. 14 March 1931	
Night Shadows	31 March 1931	
Song of the Market Place	31 March 1931	
The Devil's Cabaret	13 April 1931	
The Blue Express	20 April 1931	
The Naggers	24 April 1931	
The Virtuous Husband	4 May 1931	
Siamese Twins	10 June 1931	
Town Scandal	22 June 1931	
The Victim	2 July 1931	
Ships of Hate	9 July 1931	
Hidden Evidence	20 July 1931	
The Gigolo Racket	10 September 1931	
Just a Gigolo	10 September 1931	
Take 'em and Shake 'em	10 September 1931	
Easy to Get	16 September 1931	
The Fainting Lover	16 October 1931	
Left Over Ladies	28 October 1931	
Too Many Husbands	11 November 1931	
Laugh It Off	19 November 1931	
The Road to Reno	19 November 1931	
Girls About Town	25 November 1931	
Women Go on Forever	10 December 1931	
Captain Lash	11 December 1931	
Under Eighteen	c. 24 December 1931	
Enemies of the Law	31 December 1931	
Golf Nuts	31 December 1931	
The Sultan's Cat	5 February 1932	
Good Sport	15 February 1932	
Minnie the Moocher	22 February 1932	
Lady! Please!	1 March 1932	
Night Life in Reno	8 April 1932	
The Flirty Sleepwalker	28 April 1932	
Divorce a la Mode	31 May 1932	
The Line's Busy	31 May 1932	
La Chienne	9 June 1932	
Life Begins	23 August 1932	
Night Beat	24 August 1932	
Tango	27 September 1932	
Here, Prince	3 November 1932	
The Last Mile	18 November 1932	
Her Mad Night	25 November 1932	
False Faces	2 December 1932	
Thirteen Steps	27 February 1933	
Alimony Madness	11 April 1933	
Gold Diggers of Paris	11 April 1933	
Her Resale Value	12 April 1933	
What Price Decency	12 April 1933	
Caliente Love	26 April 1933	
Bondage	11 May 1933	
Hello, Sister!	11 May 1933	
Terror Aboard	19 May 1933	
India Speaks	7 June 1933	
Kiss of Araby	8 June 1933	
Private Wives	28 June 1933	
Detective Tom Howard of the Suicide Squad	28 July 1933	
Betty Boop's Big Boss	3 August 1933	
Picture Brides	29 September 1933	
What Price Innocence?	16 October 1933	
Poil De Carrotte	27 October 1933	
The Deserter	21 November 1933	
Fanny's Wedding Day	15 December 1933	
The Wandering Jew	16 March 1934	
Found Alive	22 March 1934	
Red Hot Mamma	26 March 1934	
Hell's Fire	26 March 1934	
The Expectant Father	27 March 1934	
Honeymoon Hotel	6 April 1934	
Sultan Pepper	15 April 1934	
March of the Years No. 5	24 April 1934	
Casanova	27 May 1934	
Fluchtlinge	17 June 1934	
Road to Ruin	21 June 1934	
A Penny a Peep	9 July 1934	
The World in Revolt	6 September 1934	
Hitler's Reign of Terror	11 September 1934	
Animal Life in the Chaparral	12 September 1934	
Struggle for Existence	13 September 1934	
Leningrad	2 October 1934	
Men in Black	13 November 1934	
Nifty Nurses	13 November 1934	
Old Kentucky Hounds	13 November 1934	
Rhapsody in Black	22 November 1934	
Medbury in India	10 December 1934	
The Prodigal Husband	11 January 1935	
Good Morning, Eve!	12 February 1935	
Free Thaelmann	27 February 1935	
Arlette et ses papas	6 March 1935	
Storm	27 March 1935	
Amok	c. 23 May 1935	
Harlem Harmony	31 May 1935	
Yiddish Father	11 July 1935	
Suicide Club	2 August 1935	
A Nurse	29 October 1935	
Bowery Daze	29 October 1935	
The Crime of Dr. Crespi	4 December 1935	
Fighting Lady	4 December 1935	
Show Them No Mercy!	6 December 1935	
Spring Night	8 January 1936	
One Big Happy Family	14 January 1936	
Red Republic	10 February 1936	
The Leavenworth Case	26 February 1936	
Hunter's Paradise	26 June 1936	
Jenny	27 October 1936	
Lucrezia	1937	
Skeleton Frolic	23 February 1937	
Wrestling	1 June 1937	
Cloistered	2 June 1937	
That Man Samson	12 June 1937	
Sunday Go to Meetin' Time	14 July 1937	
Sports Greatest Thrills	5 October 1937	
Wedding Yells	16 July 1938	
Avec le sourire	25 November 1938	
The Birth of a Baby (Note: This work has been rejected more than once after a resubmission by the distributor.)	1939	
Entente cordiale	28 April 1939	
Puppets	11 July 1939	

=== 1940s ===
Work	Date rejected	Sources
Mystic Circle Murder	31 March 1944	
Behind Locked Doors	26 October 1948	
Bodyhold	29 December 1949	

=== 1950s ===
Work	Date rejected	Sources
The Devil's Weed	24 August 1950	
Chained for Life	23 July 1952	
Problem Girls	3 March 1953	
I Vinti	12 May 1954	
Operation Manhunt	29 October 1954	
Fabian of Scotland Yard: Murder in Soho	27 February 1955	
Three Bad Sisters	28 November 1955	
One Way Ticket to Hell	8 March 1957	
A Strange Marriage	3 October 1957	
The Third Sex	9 December 1957	
The Mugger	27 March 1958	
Holiday on Sylt	20 August 1958	
Joy Ride	4 May 1959	
A Diary for Anne Frank	21 August 1959	
I Spit on Your Grave	9 December 1959	

=== 1960s ===
Work	Date rejected	Sources
Private Property	30 March 1960	
The Warsaw Ghetto	8 November 1960	
The Wrestling Octopus	8 March 1961	
Ma Barker's Killer Brood	9 May 1961	
Action J	7 July 1961	
Anatomy of a Psycho	3 August 1961	
A Matter of Morals	18 August 1961	
The Couch	10 October 1961	
The New Angels	1 January 1962	
Nuremberg	24 January 1962	
Professional Secret	14 June 1962	
Blood Lust	25 June 1962	
Bloody Brood	3 August 1962	
Pagan Island	5 November 1962	
The Sinister Urge	29 November 1962	
Free, White and 21	30 April 1963	
Berlin Today	9 May 1963	
Swinging U.K.	3 September 1963	
Super Spectacles in the World	1 October 1963	
Hot Head	6 November 1963	
Neon Night Life	5 December 1963	
Street Without End	27 April 1964	
Hollywood Nude Report	5 May 1964	
Sexy!	2 June 1964	
Shock Treatment	2 June 1964	
Kitten with a Whip	8 July 1964	
Mental Cruelty	10 July 1964	
I Malamondo	2 September 1964	
Fanny Hill	20 January 1965	
Under Age	25 February 1965	
Festival Girls	1 November 1965	
Girls on Street Corners	12 January 1966	
Sylt, Salt and Sweet Girls	25 March 1966	
The Fat Black Pussycat	20 April 1966	
The Fear	15 July 1966	
The Pornographer	20 October 1966	
Strip	1 December 1966	
I, a Woman	25 January 1967	
Number Four	7 March 1967	
Black Market of Love	10 April 1967	
Bloody Pit of Horror	4 August 1967	
The Love-Ins	18 August 1967	
Chelsea Girls	17 November 1967	
Bedtime	22 November 1967	
491	23 January 1968	
Miracle of Love	19 August 1968	
Pamela	2 December 1968	
Birds Mean Business	10 December 1968	
Damned by Desire	16 April 1969	
The Set	9 May 1969	
The Love Clinic	11 July 1969	
Woman's Experience of the Male	4 December 1969	

=== 1970s ===
Work	Date rejected	Sources
All Together Now	11 February 1970	
Succubus	11 March 1970	
Appointment with Lust	14 April 1970	
Tropic of Cancer	29 May 1970	
Hot Spur	25 June 1970	
The Marriage Manual	1 October 1970	
Wonderland of Love	6 January 1971	
Technique of Physical Love	18 February 1971	
Ripening Love	28 June 1971	
Psycho Lover	13 August 1971	
Brute Corps	30 December 1971	
The Telephone Book	30 December 1971	
Wild Riders	31 December 1971	
Psychology of Love	11 January 1972	
Sexual Freedom in Denmark	26 January 1972	
Homoeroticus	28 July 1972	
Easy Virtue	14 September 1972	
The Apprentice	19 February 1973	
Bloody Friday	13 March 1973	
Love School	19 March 1973	
Secrets of Death Room	5 July 1973	
Snow White and the Seven Perverts	5 July 1973	
Prison Girls	14 September 1973	
The Candy Snatchers	21 November 1973	
Dancing Girl	2 January 1974	
Techniques of Love	2 January 1974	
Teenage Love	7 January 1974	
Hamburg: City of Sin	6 March 1974	
Apprentice Girl's Report	23 April 1974	
How to Seduce a Virgin	8 May 1974	
The Growling Tiger	27 June 1974	
The Million Dollar Kiss	28 June 1974	
Salesman Report	1 October 1974	
Les Angers Pervers	8 January 1975	
The Punishment	10 March 1975	
Sweet Movie	1 April 1975	
Woman's Best Friend	28 April 1975	
Ilsa, She Wolf of the SS	9 June 1975	
Fiebre	4 September 1975	
Mates for Pleasure	11 November 1975	
Bamboo House Dolls	8 December 1975	
Justine and Juliette	29 December 1975	
My X Wife	28 January 1976	
Violated Angels	16 March 1976	
Exhibition	23 March 1976	
She Tries Every Man	28 June 1976	
Blew!	20 July 1976	
Schoolgirls for Sale	30 July 1976	
The Coming of Seymour	1 September 1976	
Made in Sexe	16 September 1976	
Laure	17 November 1976	
Four Days of Love	1 February 1977	
Nazi Love Camp 27	5 April 1977	
Deported Women	3 November 1977	
Teenage Playmates	16 November 1977	
J'ai très envie	6 December 1977	

=== 1980s ===
Work	Date rejected	Notes	Sources
Midnight Desires	2 June 1981		
Love, Lust and Ecstasy	6 July 1981	Prior to being rejected, this film was passed X with cuts on 24 March 1981.	
Fight for Your Life	9 October 1981		
Forced Entry	16 June 1982		
How Sweet It Is	1 December 1982		
The Awakening of Emily	5 April 1983		
Boardinghouse	21 July 1983		
The Other Side of Madness	2 August 1983		
Black Alley Cats	4 January 1984		
Caligula... The Untold Story	8 February 1984	Prior to being rejected for home video release, this film was passed 18 with cuts for cinema release on 25 January 1984.	
Story of O: Chapter 2	13 November 1984		
Precious Jewels	19 February 1985		
Sid and Nancy trailer	28 May 1986	The film itself was passed 18 uncut.	
Chained	26 September 1986		
War Victims	3 December 1986		
Target Massacre	9 January 1987		
Warden’s End	1 July 1987		
Savage Streets trailer	5 August 1987	The film itself was originally also rejected, but was passed 18 with cuts the same year before being passed uncut in 2011.	
Possession: Until Death do You Part	2 September 1987		
Violators	31 December 1987		
Sixth Form at St Winifred's	31 December 1987		
Head Girl at St Winifred's	31 December 1987		
Contagion trailer	17 February 1988	The film itself was passed 18 with cuts.	
Rambo III trailer	19 May 1988	The film itself was originally passed 18 with cuts, later being passed uncut in 2001.	
A Coming of Angels	19 June 1988		
The Dead Pool trailer	27 June 1988	The film itself was originally passed 18 with cuts, later being passed uncut in 2002.	
Cohen and Tate trailer	27 November 1988	The film itself was originally passed 18 uncut, later being downgraded to 15 in 2016.	
Hidden Rage	15 December 1988	Also known as Perfect Victims, this horror film was rejected due to its focus on a serial rapist and murderer with AIDS who deliberately infects young women who he blames for his condition, which the BBFC described as "an image which runs counter to the great efforts made in Britain to encourage attitudes of compassion and understanding for the victims of disease."	

=== 1990s ===
Work	Date rejected	Notes	Sources
Sixteen Special	9 November 1990	A pornographic film in which a schoolgirl is seduced by a middle-aged man. The distributor was given the option of replacing the opening scene, in which the 21-year-old actress is seen wearing a school uniform and holding a teddy bear, but they declined, resulting in the film being rejected as "by seeking to glamorise and eroticise the seduction of a schoolgirl, the work had a clear tendency to deprave and corrupt."	
Tied & Tickled 4	20 August 1992	These films both "purported to be light-hearted comedy dramas about the tickling of captive women by their kidnappers, but turned out to be a thinly veiled excuse for forcible stripping and sexual abuse."	
Tied & Tickled 18	20 August 1992	These films both "purported to be light-hearted comedy dramas about the tickling of captive women by their kidnappers, but turned out to be a thinly veiled excuse for forcible stripping and sexual abuse."	
A Brief Encounter	5 February 1993	This pornographic film consisting almost entirely of a woman being spanked was rejected on the grounds of sexual violence, despite both performers clearly deriving pleasure from the spanking, as "videos that consist primarily of the spanking or beating of female victims, even where the script purports to demonstrate the willing consent of the victim, are unacceptable where these are intended for the sole purpose of inducing a state of sexual arousal in the male viewer." It was the only work rejected in 1993.	
Martini Advert – Ferrari	17 July 1995		
Martini Advert – Mogul	17 July 1995		
Martini Advert – Yacht	17 July 1995		
Martini Advert – Nightclub	17 July 1995		
MEDACT Advert – Day of the Jacques	25 August 1995		
Schoolgirl Fantasy	5 October 1995	This pornographic film featuring two women dressed as schoolgirls was rejected as "its purpose seemed to be the encouragement of men to fantasise about sex with underage schoolgirls."	
Diesel Jeans Advert – Jesus Lives	19 August 1996	This cinema advertisement satirising American televangelism was rejected for being "likely to cause serious offence to those viewers with deeply felt religious convictions" despite two appeals.	
S&M – Why?	20 December 1996	While this film was submitted as a sex education video, the Board deemed it to be "selling the techniques of sado-masochism in a glossy and highly erotic manner, so that the educational context was overwhelmed by the S & M content. [...] The message that pain is the real source of pleasure seemed likely to encourage men to inflict pain without consideration of the rights and vulnerabilities of their partners."	
Bare Fist: The Sport That Wouldn't Die	23 December 1996	This documentary about English bare-knuckle boxer Lenny McLean was rejected for "devot[ing] far too much of its time to selling and demonstrating the pleasures of gross violence." The film was rejected a second time on 21 April 1998.	
Urotsukidoji IV Part One: The Secret Garden	30 December 1996	This hentai film was rejected for eroticising sexual violence, with the Board singling out a scene in which a preteen boy is sexually assaulted by two nude women in their annual report. It was rejected a second time on 1 August 2000.	
La Blue Girl	30 December 1996	This hentai film was rejected for eroticised scenes of tentacle rape.	
Ultimate Pursuits	30 December 1996	Described in the 1996-97 Annual Report as "a video advertising the services of prostitutes."	
Brave, Bashed, Battered and Bruised	23 December 1997	This karate documentary was rejected for "selling the pleasures of gross violence through its unrelenting focus on the infliction of injury and pain."	
Date With a Mistress	23 December 1997	This BDSM film was rejected for its "pornographic treatment of sex in a context of force, restraint and the infliction of pain."	
S.A.S. Weapons & Training	23 December 1997	This documentary about the Special Air Service was rejected for "selling the glamour and excitement of handguns as well as detailed instructions in their use."	
Changing Room Exposed	27 June 1998	This gay pornographic film consisting of intimate footage from a men's changing room, which the original distributor admitted was filmed without the knowledge or consent of those depicted, was rejected on the grounds that "the recording of the material in question was a clear invasion of privacy and the distribution of the resulting video would exacerbate that." When the film was resubmitted under the title Video Voyeur in late 2001, a new distributor claimed all footage shown in the film was staged by actors, but their inability to provide evidence of this resulted in a second rejection on 12 February 2002.	
Frisk	27 June 1998	This serial killer film was rejected for its juxtaposition of sex and violence, which the Board deemed harmful.	
Elida Fabergé Fusion Advert – Bouncer	1 September 1998		
Banned from Television	9 February 1999	This compilation of real footage of death and injury, accompanied by "sensationalised" narration that "invited the enjoyment of human suffering", was deemed "potentially harmful because of its possible influence on attitudes and behaviour, as well as its utter lack of respect for the dignity of human life - and death."	

=== 21st century ===
Work	Date rejected	Sources	Notes
Lolita DVD Extra (The Lake Point Cottages)	27 March 2000	While the main feature was passed 18 uncut, these extended scenes of sexual encounters between an adult man and a teenage girl were deemed likely to encourage interest in underage sexual activity, especially when divorced from the narrative context of the film itself.	
Lolita DVD Extra (The Comic Book)	27 March 2000	While the main feature was passed 18 uncut, these extended scenes of sexual encounters between an adult man and a teenage girl were deemed likely to encourage interest in underage sexual activity, especially when divorced from the narrative context of the film itself.	
A Caning for Miss Granger	24 November 2000	This pornographic film, in which the lead performer is "forced to submit to a series of degrading or dehumanising acts in order to save her job" and in at least one scene is spanked while dressed as a schoolgirl, violated R18 guidelines forbidding the depiction of adults roleplaying as children and acts portrayed as non-consensual, even if consensually simulated in reality.	
Victoria's Secret World – Episode One	11 February 2002		
Hooligans	20 March 2002	This compilation of real-life footage of football hooliganism accompanied by narration portrays the violence in an overtly positive, uncritical and celebratory manner, which the BBFC deemed likely to "appeal to and validate the behaviour of real life hooligans." The Board also noted apparent racism and xenophobia within the video.	
PETA Europe Advert – Fur Is Dead	17 June 2002		
Love Camp 7	23 September 2002	This 1969 Nazisploitation film was rejected a second time on 13 March 2020 as it consists mostly of "scenes of non consensual sexual activity, including rape, presented in a manner that is intended to arouse viewers."	
Spy of Darkness	9 April 2003	This 1996 hentai film consisting almost entirely of explicit rape scenes was rejected for "suggest[ing] that the appropriate response from the victims is to enjoy being raped" and therefore eroticising and endorsing the act.	
Bumfights	14 July 2003	The first installment in this video series largely consisting of homeless men performing dangerous stunts, which the BBFC describes as them being "abused assaulted and humiliated", was rejected for "exploiting the physical and other vulnerabilities of homeless people."	
Women in Cellblock 9	24 February 2004	This 1977 women-in-prison film was rejected for multiple eroticised scenes of nude women being sexually assaulted and tortured, as well as a pending amendment to the Protection of Children Act 1978 via the Sexual Offences Act 2003, as one of the lead actresses, Susan Hemingway, was 16 at the time of filming.	
The Howling DVD Extra (Fake Porn Movie)	19 March 2004	While the main feature was passed 18 uncut, this bonus feature consisting of two out-of-context scenes of women being sexually assaulted, clips of which were shown in the main feature to "illustrate the degenerate nature of one of the characters", was rejected for eroticising sexual assault.	
Terrorists, Killers & Other Wackos	19 January 2005	This compilation of real footage of executions, suicides, accidents and torture with "no journalistic, educational or other justifying context" was rejected for trivialising death and suffering as well as an "undercurrent of racism and xenophobia."	
The Hash Man	14 February 2005	These instructional videos on cultivating cannabis plants were all rejected per the Misuse of Drugs Act 1971, which criminalises the unlicensed cultivation of such plants, as well as the ownership, use and supply of cannabis. Additionally, all three videos acknowledge that growing cannabis is illegal in several parts of the world and advise the viewer on avoiding detection.	
High – Yield Hydroponic Systems	14 February 2005	These instructional videos on cultivating cannabis plants were all rejected per the Misuse of Drugs Act 1971, which criminalises the unlicensed cultivation of such plants, as well as the ownership, use and supply of cannabis. Additionally, all three videos acknowledge that growing cannabis is illegal in several parts of the world and advise the viewer on avoiding detection.	
Introduction to Indoor Growing	14 February 2005	These instructional videos on cultivating cannabis plants were all rejected per the Misuse of Drugs Act 1971, which criminalises the unlicensed cultivation of such plants, as well as the ownership, use and supply of cannabis. Additionally, all three videos acknowledge that growing cannabis is illegal in several parts of the world and advise the viewer on avoiding detection.	
Mushroom Growing Made Easy	14 February 2005	The BBFC rejected this instructional video on cultivating psilocybin mushrooms on the grounds that a bill passing through Parliament at the time would likely criminalise the cultivation and possession of such mushrooms.	
Severe Punishment	18 March 2005	This pornographic film was rejected for strong images of sadomasochism that violated R18 guidelines.	
Traces of Death	22 June 2005	This 1993 mondo film compiling graphic footage of real deaths without "journalistic, educational or other justifying context" was rejected for sensationalising the topic.	
Struggle in Bondage	22 December 2006	This pornographic film was rejected for scenes of apparently unconsensual bondage.	
Weeds: Season 2 DVD Extra (Cream of the Crop)	22 June 2007	While the season itself was passed 18 uncut, this bonus feature in which a cast member discusses his top five marijuana varieties in the style of a cooking programme was rejected for encouraging the use of illegal drugs.	
Murder-Set-Pieces	27 February 2008	This horror film about a serial killer and rapist was rejected for "a clear focus on sex or sexual behaviour accompanied by non-consensual pain, injury and humiliation" with the Board also noting that children were among the victims.	
The Texas Vibrator Massacre	18 August 2008	This porn parody of The Texas Chain Saw Massacre was rejected for eroticised scenes of sexual violence and incest.	
NF713	3 April 2009	This film in which a female "enemy of the state" is tortured was banned after its primary purpose was judged to be "to sexually arouse the viewer at the sight of a woman being sexually humiliated, tortured and abused".	
Grotesque	18 August 2009	This horror film focusing on the abduction, torture and eventual murder of a young couple was rejected due to lack of sufficient contextual or narrative justification for its scenes of graphic violence, unlike other "torture porn" films such as the Saw and Hostel series.	
My Daughter's a Cocksucker	29 September 2009	This pornographic film was rejected for its incest theme, as well as scenes in which "women gag and choke during ‘deep throat’ fellatio while their heads are firmly held by the male performer, preventing them from easily ending the activity. The evident discomfort of the female performer is presented as, at best, an irrelevance or, at worst, as a feature designed to heighten the arousal of some viewers."	
Lost in the Hood	7 May 2010	This gay pornographic film was rejected for its focus on eroticised sexual violence.	
The Bunny Game	12 October 2011	The board wrote about this horror film focusing on the abduction and abuse of a prostitute, "The principal focus of The Bunny Game is the unremitting sexual and physical abuse of a helpless woman, as well as the sadistic and sexual pleasure the man derives from this. The emphasis on the woman's nudity tends to eroticise what is shown, while aspects of the work such as the lack of explanation of the events depicted, and the stylistic treatment, may encourage some viewers to enjoy and share in the man's callousness and the pleasure he takes in the woman's pain and humiliation."	
Hate Crime	2 March 2015	This horror film about a Jewish family being terrorised, physically and sexually abused and murdered by a group of neo-Nazis was rejected as "the unremitting manner in which Hate Crime focuses on physical and sexual abuse, aggravated by racist invective, means that to issue a classification to this work, even if confined to adults, would be inconsistent with the Board's Guidelines, would risk potential harm, and would be unacceptable to broad public opinion."	
The Gestapo's Last Orgy	26 January 2021	This 1977 Nazisploitation film was rejected for persistent scenes of sadism and sexual violence in an antisemitic context.	
Reality Killers	1 July 2024	This 2005 horror film was rejected as "[p]otentially harmful attitudes, such as the suggestion that victims and perpetrators ‘enjoy’ violence, and that women are presented primarily as sex objects or predatory killers, are not clearly challenged, nor is there a narrative counterbalance to the sustained focus on sadism."	
To Kill a War Machine	5 July 2025	This documentary was originally classified 15 uncut before having its classification revoked after its subject, Palestine Action, were proscribed under the Terrorism Act 2000.	

== See also ==
- British Board of Film Classification
- 18 (British Board of Film Classification)
- Censorship in the United Kingdom
- History of British film certificates
- Irish Film Classification Office – the equivalent to the BBFC in the Republic of Ireland
- Motion picture content rating system
- Obscene Publications Act
- Press Complaints Commission
- Film censorship in the United Kingdom
- R18 certificate
