= Touch of Death (disambiguation) =

Touch of Death is a martial arts move.

Touch of Death may also refer to:

- Touch of Death (1961 film)
- Touch of Death (Lucio Fulci film), an Italian horror film
- "Touch of Death" (crossover event), a two-part crossover special between Hawaii Five-0 and NCIS: Los Angeles
- Touch of Death (Dungeons & Dragons), an adventure for the Dungeons & Dragons role-playing game
- A touch of death combo, a term within the fighting game community referring to a type of combo that can end matches if a certain initial attack hits.
