= Terror Express =

- Italian film poster
- Directed by: Ferdinando Baldi
- Screenplay by: Luigi Montefiori
- Produced by: Manolo Bolognini
- Starring: Silvia Dionisio; Werner Pochath; Zora Kerova
- Cinematography: Giuseppe Aquari
- Edited by: Alessandro Lucidi
- Music by: Marcello Giombini
- Production company: Coop. Rinascita Cinematografica
- Distributed by: Cinedaf
- Release date: 1979
- Language: Italian

Terror Express (Italian: La ragazza del vagone letto, lit. "The girl in the sleeping car") is a 1979 Italian crime thriller film directed by Ferdinando Baldi and starring Silvia Dionisio. The screenplay was written by George Eastman.

== Plot ==
A dozen passengers find themselves on some carriages of a train on a long trip. Among them a prostitute, a few couples, some girls, a policeman and three criminals; the latter steal the gun from the policeman and take control of some coaches, committing murders, rapes and humiliation. But an unexpected stop will give Peter, a former convict, the opportunity for revenge.

== Cast ==
- Silvia Dionisio as Giulia
- Werner Pochath as Elio
- Zora Kerova as Anna
- Venantino Venantini as Anna's Husband
- Andrea Scotti as Willis
- Carlo De Mejo as David
- Gianluigi Chirizzi as Peter
- Giancarlo Maestri as The Policeman
