= Ria De Simone =

Italian actress and singer (1947–1995)

- Born: Anna Maria De Simone; 6 June 1947; Rome, Italy
- Died: 10 November 1995 (aged 48); Mentana, Italy
- Occupations: Actress; singer
- Years active: 1961–1995
- Mother: Olga Romanelli
- Relatives: Lily Romanelli (sister)

Anna Maria "Ria" De Simone (6 June 1947 – 10 November 1995) was an Italian actress and singer.

== Biography ==
Born in Rome and the daughter of actress Olga Romanelli, De Simone began her education at the Silvio d'Amico National Academy of Dramatic Arts and at fourteen years of age, she and her sister made their acting debuts in the 1961 film Totòtruffa 62 featuring Totò. Into the 1970s onwards, De Simone began appearing in supporting roles in the commedia sexy all'italiana genre as well as the poliziotteschi and horror genre usually playing seductive women lacking inhibitions.

One of De Simone's final film appearances was in the 1990 film A Cat in the Brain. She did not actually appear in the film, but unused footage from her preceding film Touch of Death was used. As a singer, she accompanied Rocky Roberts on his 1987 tour and she worked on an album.

== Death ==
De Simone died in Mentana from brain cancer on 10 November 1995, at the age of 48.

== Filmography ==
=== Cinema ===
- Totòtruffa 62 (1961)
- When Men Carried Clubs and Women Played Ding-Dong (1971)
- Jus primae noctis (1972)
- Little Funny Guy (1973)
- Lovers and Other Relatives (1974)
- La bolognese (1975)
- Vieni, vieni amore mio (1975)
- Soldier of Fortune (1976)
- Il compromesso... erotico (Menage a quattro) (1976)
- Storia di arcieri, pugni e occhi neri (1976)
- Sex with a Smile II (1976)
- Sorbole... che romagnola (1976)
- Professor of Natural Sciences (1976)
- Cuginetta... amore mio! (1976)
- La clinica dell'amore (1976)
- The Black Maid (1976)
- The Virgo, the Taurus and the Capricorn (1977)
- La presidentessa (1977)
- For the Love of Poppaea (1977)
- KZ9 - Lager di sterminio (1977)
- Napoli... serenata calibro 9 (1978)
- Alessia... un vulcano sotto la pelle (1978)
- The Highschool Girl Repeating Class (1978)
- Gegè Bellavita (1978)
- The School Teacher in the House (1978)
- La ripetente fa l'occhietto al preside (1980)
- La moglie in bianco... l'amante al pepe (1980)
- I carabbimatti (1981)
- Torna (1984)
- Guapparia (1984)
- Touch of Death (1987)
- A Cat in the Brain (1990)

=== Television ===
- Caccia al ladro d'autore (1985)
- Investigatori d'Italia (1987)
- Disperatamente Giulia (1989)
- Aquile (1990)
