= Antropophagus =

- Theatrical release poster
- Directed by: Joe D'Amato
- Written by: Joe D'Amato; George Eastman
- Produced by: Joe D'Amato; George Eastman; Oscar Santaniello
- Starring: George Eastman; Tisa Farrow; Zora Kerova; Saverio Vallone; Serena Grandi
- Edited by: Ornella Micheli
- Music by: Marcello Giombini
- Production companies: Filmirage; Produzioni Cinematografiche Massaccesi International
- Distributed by: Variety Distribution
- Release date: 9 August 1980 (Italy)
- Running time: 92 minutes
- Country: Italy
- Languages: Italian; German

Antropophagus (also known as Anthropophagus: The Beast, The Savage Island, and The Grim Reaper) is a 1980 Italian horror film directed by Joe D'Amato, co-written by D'Amato and George Eastman, and starring Tisa Farrow, Zora Kerova, Saverio Vallone, Serena Grandi, Margaret Mazzantini, Mark Bodin, and Eastman, who portrays a cannibal stalking tourists on a remote island.

Antropophagus has been described as having "a noted place in the annals of the escalation of gore". The film has gained cult status- if only "amongst fringe horror video audiences". It has been argued that the reason for its cult status lies in its theme of cannibalism, hence "consumption of humans", which lends itself to cult reception. The scene in which the titular man eater strangles a pregnant woman, tears out the fetus from her womb and bites into it, made it become one of the infamous "video nasties" that was prosecuted in the United Kingdom in the early 1980s, and the "controversy greatly aided its cult reputation" as well.

== Plot ==
A pair of Germans visiting a remote Greek island go to the beach and are slaughtered by someone who emerges from the ocean.

Five travelers are preparing to tour the islands, and a woman named Julie joins them. Julie asks for a ride to an island on which some of her friends live. The only one who objects to this detour to the island (which Julie explains has only a few permanent residents and only sees tourists a few months out of the year) is Carol, whose tarot cards, the Tarocco Piemontese, convince her that something bad will happen if they go. The group sails to the island anyway. While disembarking, the pregnant Maggie hurts her ankle, so she stays behind on the boat with its owner. A man attacks the ship, ripping off the sailor's head and abducting Maggie.

The others explore the island's town, discovering it in disarray and abandoned, except for an elusive woman in black, who writes "Go Away" on a dusty window. A rotting corpse that appears to have been cannibalized is uncovered in a house, prompting everyone to rush back to the boat, which is adrift. With no other options, the group goes to the house owned by Julie's friends, where they find the family's blind daughter, Henriette. After wounding Daniel in a panic, Henriette calms down and rants about there being a madman who smells of blood prowling the island.

Andy and Arnold search the town for antibiotics to stop Daniel's wound from getting infected. Carol walks in on Daniel flirting with Julie and goes into hysterics, running off into the night. Julie goes after Carol but loses her and meets up with Andy and Arnold. The disfigured killer breaks into the house and rips Daniel's throat out, but leaves Henriette alone and flees as the others return. Everyone treks through the island in the morning and finds a mansion belonging to Klaus Wortman. Julie mentions that she read that Klaus, his wife, and their child are assumed dead, having been shipwrecked, a tragedy which caused Klaus' sister Ruth to become unhinged. Ruth (the woman in black from earlier) watches the group enter the building, comforts the sleeping Carol, and hangs herself.

After Carol wakes up, Andy and Arnold look out a window and see that the boat has drifted close to shore. The two men go to secure the vessel, and Julie finds a partially destroyed journal among the objects in the mansion. It reveals that the killer is Klaus and that the bodies of all of Klaus' victims are in a hidden room. Andy and Arnold split up, and the latter reaches an abandoned church, where he finds Maggie and is confronted by Klaus. Klaus has a flashback that reveals he and his family were stranded in a raft after being shipwrecked and that Klaus accidentally stabbed his wife while trying to convince her that they should eat the body of their dead son to survive. Klaus then ate his wife and son's corpses, driving him insane. Klaus regains his composure, stabs Arnold, then strangles Maggie to death. As Arnold slowly dies, he watches in horror as Klaus rips out and eats Maggie's unborn child.

Julie uncovers the room where Klaus' victims are at the mansion and skims through another diary she finds. Carol stumbles into the chamber and drops dead from a slit throat. Klaus then attacks Julie, who locks herself and Henriette in the attic after a short chase. Klaus breaks through the ceiling and kills Henriette, and is then knocked off the roof by Julie and falls into a well. When Julie peers down the well, Klaus attacks her, but she is saved when Andy appears and stabs Klaus in the stomach with a pickaxe, causing the cannibal's intestines to spill out. As a last dying act, Klaus gnaws on his innards, staring at Andy, while Julie looks at Klaus in horror; Klaus then falls over and dies. The film ends with Andy and Julie standing over Klaus' body, staring at each other in shock.

== Cast ==
- Tisa Farrow as Julie
- Saverio Vallone as Andy
- Serena Grandi as Maggie
- Margaret Mazzantini as Henriette
- Mark Bodin as Daniel
- Bob Larson as Arnold
- Rubina Rey as Ruth Wortman
- Simone Baker as First Victim
- Mark Logan as Second Victim
- George Eastman as Klaus Wortmann
- Zora Kerova as Carol

== Production ==
=== Pre-production ===
Antropophagus was produced in collaboration between Produzioni Cinematografiche Massaccesi International (PCM International), which had recently been founded by Joe D'Amato to distribute his film Sesso nero, and Filmirage, founded by both Donatella Donati and D'Amato. Additional funding was supplied by Eureka International, a company founded by Edward Sarlui which specialized in licensing films abroad.

In an interview, D'Amato stated that it was the first film his company Filmirage had produced.

=== Filming ===
Shooting for Antropophagus lasted from 31 March 1980 to May 1980. D'Amato said it was filmed in Italian, unlike its sequel Rosso Sangue, which was filmed in English.

Although the film is set on a Greek island, only part of the production crew went to Greece to film around the Acropolis of Athens. The rest of the film was shot in Italy. Sperlonga was used for the scenes in the white village, the catacombs were those of Santa Savinilla close to the lake of Nepi, and the man-eater's villa was the "Conservatorio di Santa Eufemia" in Rome. Many interior shots were made in the small villa in Sacrofano owned by Donatella Donati's father, Ermanno Donati; it had already been used as set for some Black Emanuelle films. The Greek island that the barque approaches in the film is in reality Italian Ponza.

Ursula-Helen Kassaveti observed in the film an "irrational transformation and geographical restructuring of Athens. The experienced editor Ornella Micheli links places of the city which in no other case could be tied together".

Like in Sesso nero, the credit for cinematography went to Enrico Biribicchi, whereas D'Amato only took credit as cameraman. Both D'Amato and Biribicchi later claimed to have done the cinematography. Biribicchi stated that he had started together with D'Amato at the age of 28 and therefore had been very proud when D'Amato asked him to act as cinematographer, not only as cameraman. Biribicchi also said that he was very satisfied with his own work on the film, in particular the scenes in the catacombs and the ones on the barque they had rented for the occasion. He further stated that after Antropophagus, D'Amato asked him to act as cinematographer on some red light films as well, for which he had to use a pseudonym for reasons of censorship. D'Amato, on the other hand, claimed that he had done the cinematography himself and that Biribicchi's name was only put in the credits because the union had placed a limit on the number of jobs a single person was allowed to do for a film.

In an interview, D'Amato stated that Antropophagus had been "perhaps the lowest costing movie of my film career (made on 16 mm film and then blown up to 35 mm)." He said "I had to shorten the scene where Montefiori devours Serena Grandi's fetus, which, in actual fact, was a skinned rabbit covered in blood.

=== Score ===
The electronic music for the film was performed by Marcello Giombini on two ARP 2600 synthesizers. The original recordings of this music are considered to be lost. The version of the film titled The Grim Reaper which was released in the United States uses music from Kingdom of the Spiders instead of Giombini's score.

Some of Giombini's music was newly performed and recorded by Deak Fearance and Roger Conrad and released by the Austrian label Cineploit.

== Release ==
Antropophagus was released in Italy on 9 August 1980. It was released in the United States on 9 October 1981, under the alternate title The Grim Reaper, through Film Ventures International.

=== Home media ===
On home video, an English language cut of the film intended for UK audiences, titled The Grim Reaper, was distributed on VHS and DVD by Film Ventures International (FVI). It is heavily edited and discards most of the gore scenes and presents a shorter and different film, one that is 87 minutes long instead of 92. This release also did not include special features.

In 2005, Shriek Show released a two-disc special edition DVD of the film, released as Anthropophagus: The Grim Reaper. Despite retaining the "Grim Reaper" title on the case, this is the original Italian uncut version of the film (albeit without the Italian language opening and closing credits), featuring an English and Italian audio tracks, subtitles, photo gallery, trailers, a feature length Joe D'Amato documentary called "Totally Uncut Two", the film's alternate U.S. theatrical opening and a Q&A with actors Zora Kerova and George Eastman.

In 2018, along with its "spiritual sequel", Absurd, Severin Films released a Blu-ray of Antropophagus that was an improvement on prior releases. It features a 1080p presentation of the film sourced from a 2K scan of the original 16mm camera negative, color correction, uncompressed English and Italian audio tracks and newly translated English subtitles. For special features, the release contained a never-before-seen deleted scene, "The Eastman Chronicles": a 2017 interview with George Eastman, "Cannibal Frenzy": an interview with special effects artist Pietro Tenoglio, interviews with actors Zora Kerova, Saverio Vallone and editor Bruno Micheli, a featurette with film historian Alessio di Rocco, Italian opening and closing credits and theatrical trailers.

== Reception ==
=== Critical response ===
According to D'Amato, Antropophagus "had a tremendous, though totally unexpected, success both with the critics and the public" abroad.

From retrospective reviews, the book Spaghetti Nightmares called the film "professionally and cleverly made" and stated that it "immediately became the symbol for Italian gore". AllMovie gave the film two out of five stars, describing it as a "Z-grade Italian 'gorror' movie", but also as a "yummy bit of fun". DVD Verdict wrote that "Anthropophagus may be the most notable horror effort mounted by Euro-skin and sin maestro Joe D'Amato, but that doesn't mean that it's particularly a good film."

Writer John Kenneth Muir praised the film as a "scary little Italian flick" and noted it for its atmosphere and final chase sequence.

== See also ==
- Horror (genre)

== Sources ==
- Dyer, Richard (2015). Lethal Repetition: Serial Killing in European Cinema. New York City, New York: Palgrave. ISBN 978-1-844-57926-6.
- Giangrande, Antonio (2020). Giustiziopoli prima parte: Disfunzioni del sistema contro i singoli (in Italian). Antonio Giangrande.
- Hunter, Jack (2002). The Bad Mirror. London, England: Creation. ISBN 978-1-840-68072-0.
- Hutchings, Peter (2009). The A to Z of Horror Cinema. Lanham, Maryland: Scarecrow Press. ISBN 978-0-810-87050-5.
- Kassaveti, Ursula-Helen (2014). "Anthropophagus". In Poupou, Anna; Nikolaidou, Afroditi (eds.). World Film Locations: Athens. Bristol, England: Intellect Books. pp. 51–64. ISBN 978-1-783-20359-8.
- Mathijs, Ernest; Sexton, Jamie (2012). Cult Cinema: An Introduction. Chichester, West Sussex: John Wiley & Sons. ISBN 978-1-444-39643-0.
- Muir, John Kenneth (2010). Horror Films of the 1980s. Vol. 2. Jefferson, North Carolina: McFarland. ISBN 978-0-786-45501-0.
- Palmerini, Luca M.; Mistretta, Gaetano (1996). Spaghetti Nightmares: Italian Fantasy-horrors as Seen Through the Eyes of Their Protagonists. Key West, Florida: Fantasma Books. ISBN 978-0-963-49827-4.
