= Enzo Sciotti =

Italian artist and illustrator (1944–2021)

- Born: 24 September 1944; Rome, Lazio, Italy
- Died: 11 April 2021 (aged 76); Italy
- Known for: Poster art, illustration

Enzo Sciotti (24 September 1944 – 11 April 2021) was an Italian artist and illustrator. Sciotti was known for his illustrations of more than 3000 movie posters, typically for horror films, including The Beyond, Demons, The Blood of Heroes and several other Lucio Fulci, Dario Argento, and Lamberto Bava films. He also painted covers for comics and home video releases.

== Early life ==
Enzo Sciotti was born in Rome, Italy, on 24 September 1944. His father, Emanuele Sciotti, was a church decorator, and many members of the Sciotti family were painters. As a teenager, Enzo drew a portrait of Pope John XXIII; his family sent it to the Vatican, and received a response from the Pope, who praised him. At the age of 16, thanks to his drawing talent and his passion for film, Sciotti found a job as an artist at a graphics studio in Cinecittà, producing movie posters. Another employee at the studio was Ezio Tarantelli, with whom, after 15 years at the studio, Sciotti opened his own studio – E2 – in Rome.

== Career ==
In the 1980s, Sciotti became one of the best-known cinema poster artists in Europe. While he designed art for many Italian films and was a popular artist for Italian-release posters for American movies, he was particularly known for horror film posters. In his long career Sciotti worked on many films directed by Lucio Fulci, like The House by the Cemetery, Manhattan Baby, and A Cat in the Brain, and also with other directors like Dario Argento, Lamberto Bava, David Lynch, George A. Romero, David Webb Peoples, and the Coen brothers. He illustrated comic books in the 1970s and 1980s, and made exclusive art for home video releases. He was best-known for his work on the posters of Sam Raimi's Army of Darkness, Fulci's The Beyond, Lynch's Blue Velvet and Argento's Phenomena. A copy of his Blue Velvet poster is kept in the National Gallery of Australia. For The Beyond, Sciotti was featured in the making-of features. When digital graphic art replaced traditional illustration, and DVDs and corporate companies took over, Sciotti moved away from graphics and began painting, typically portraits.

Because of a later falling out with the director, he refused, for several years, to have his name attached to his design for Tolomeo Bacci's Suffocation.

His movie poster style "combined photographic superimposition and allusive, expressive, goliardic painting", helping to create a school of aesthetic design that was closely linked to 1980s Italian comedies.

A prolific artist, he created over 3000 posters in his life, and worked with his agency until his death in April 2021; he created the home video-release covers of the Midnight Classics collection of cult classic horror films. The Guardian described him as one of the three "undisputed masters" of VHS cover art, who was "as adept at producing oil landscapes as monsters and mercenaries".

== Personal life ==
His personal Instagram, which he used as a gallery, announced his death on 11 April 2021. He died on the same day as Giannetto De Rossi, an Italian make-up artist who worked on several of the same Fulci films as Sciotti.
