= Sodoma's Ghost =

Film directed by Lucio Fulci

- Promo art
- Directed by: Lucio Fulci
- Screenplay by: Lucio Fulci; Carlo Alberto Alfieri
- Story by: Lucio Fulci; Carlo Alberto Alfieri
- Produced by: Lugi Nannerini; Antononio Lucidi
- Starring: Claudio Aliotti; Maria Concetta Salieri; Robert Egon; Al Cliver
- Cinematography: Silvano Tessicini
- Edited by: Vincenzo Tomassi
- Music by: Carlo Maria Cordio
- Production company: Cine Duck
- Release dates: October 1990 (France); 21 June 1991 (Italy)
- Running time: 84 minutes
- Country: Italy

Sodoma's Ghost is an Italian direct-to-video horror film directed by Lucio Fulci.

== Plot ==
At an isolated country house during World War II, AWOL Nazi soldiers indulge in orgiastic behavior with prostitutes. One soldier films the cavorting with a movie camera. While viewing the film, the Germans revels are brought to an end when Allied bombs land on the villa, destroying it.

In the present day, the teenager Mark, and his friends Paul, John, Anne, Celine, and Maria are driving to Paris after a touring holiday in the countryside. Driving off the main road, the group descends on the old country house. Finding the villa abandoned, they break in through the back door and elect to stay for the night. The place is plush, fully furnished, and dotted with erotic paintings and photographs. It is also haunted by the ghosts of the Nazis. That night, Willy, the young Nazi soldier who filmed the orgy, emerges from a mirror and seduces Anne as she sleeps alone in a room. Anne responds to his violent sexual overtures. After waking up the following day, Anne discovers she is unmarked and assumes it was all a bad dream.

The teenagers attempt to leave the next day, but their one attempt to drive away is thwarted when the route leads mysteriously back to the villa. Returning inside, they loiter around until dusk, when they decide to stay for another night. The next morning, they try to leave again, only this time their vehicle will not start. They go back inside to phone for help and are met with sinister responses over the phone by the police station as they attempt to call. Then, they discover that the phone line has been cut all this time, and that they are locked in the house. The window shutters resist their efforts to break through, plus all the doors are locked shut too. Claustrophobic attacks happen when Maria begins to lose her sanity. Soon, bitter arguments occur between the three men. Mark gets drunk on wine found in the cellar. After taunting Maria, he wanders off to explore more of the house.

In a room, Mark finds Nazis playing cards around a table. They invite him to join them. The others disappear, and Mark starts playing a five-hand of cards with Willy. The loser must put a revolver with a single bullet to his head and pull the trigger three times. Mark survives the game and gets his reward: an assignation with a prostitute in a neighboring room. His desire turns to horror when his hands go right through her body and into a bloody pulp. Running out of the room, Mark sees Paul, who transforms into a Nazi. Lunging at Paul, Mark falls down the stairs and breaks his neck. The others drag him into the living room, where he dies before their eyes.

Maria retreats to a room where a ghost prostitute attempts to seduce her and sow seeds of anxiety in her by saying that her lover, Anne, is cheating on her with Celine. Paul then gets approached and seduced by a possessed Anne, who turns into a rotting corpse. Looking for a way out, Paul and John find a can of film in the cellar, which seems to hold the key to the ghosts power. As Mark's corpse rots before their eyes, they hear footsteps of the approaching Nazi ghosts. The four surviving teens flee into the parlor, and decide to play the film to solve the mystery of the supernatural occurrences. The film shows the orgy while the ghosts attempt to break down the door. Just when the ghosts break down the door, the film ends with the explosion that killed the Nazis. The ghosts disappear, and the youths black out from the explosion that rocks the building. Waking up, they find themselves outside the now-ruined shell of the villa. Their experiences have apparently been nothing more than dreams, and the teens are relieved to discover that Mark is alive after all. Having enough of their adventures, the six teens pack up in their car and drive off.

== Production and release ==
=== Pre-production ===
By the second half of the 1980s, Italian cinema was finding it more difficult to get theatrical distribution. As films released to home video did not need to be sent to the rating board for a theatrical screening certificate, some productions including Sodoma's Ghost saved money by releasing films direct-to-video. The film was part of a series titled I maestri del thriller that was aimed directly at television and home video release. Producer Carlo Alberto Alfieri presented the project to Luciano Martino who rejected it, and later made a deal with August Caminito's Scena International. Caminito's company then contacted Distribuzione Alpha Cinematographica and Cine Duck and sold television rights to the series to Reteitalia.

Cinematographer Silvano Tessicini got director Lucio Fulci involved in the series. Fulci had just returned from the Philippines after shooting Zombi 3 and was ill. Tessicini initially suggested Fulci to be part of the production as a supervisor, but Fulci directed two features: Touch of Death and Sodoma's Ghost. One of the directors had originally backed out of the series, which led to Fulci directing Sodoma's Ghost based on a script written by Fulci and Carlo Alberto Alfieri years before.

=== Filming ===
Filming began on May 30, 1988 and lasted for four weeks. The film was shot around Rome and Vides Studios. Fulci later spoke negatively about both films stating that there were so many shots in the film to get the minimum running time of the films complete. Fulci also argued with the producers on set while the producers were unhappy with him as Fulci was continuously behind schedule. Actress Teresa Razzaudi also argued with Fulci because she refused to do nude scenes. This led to nude scenes where her character is seduced by a Nazi ghost being shot with a body double.

Fulci later referred to Sodoma's Ghost as his worst film and claimed he left the set leaving Mario Bianchi to finish the film. Bianchi stated he was asked by Fulci to shoot some connecting scenes for him which led to Binachi directing what he described not "half the film, but almost" Michele De Angeles later stated that Bianchi was only on the set for a few days and could not have shot that much material.

== Release and reception ==
Sodoma's Ghost was released on home video in France by Kara Video as Les Fantômes de Sodome in October 1990. It was shown on Italian television channel Telecity and Italia 7 on June 28, 1991 as Il fantasma di Sodoma.

From contemporary reviews, Cyrille Giraud wrote in Mad Movies that despite the sexual nature of the title and "nazi porn" modelled after films like Salon Kitty (1976) and The Night Porter (1974) the sex scenes remain traditional and Fulci had toned down the amount of gore dramatically from his previous films.

In his book on Fulci's films, author Stephen Thrower said that Sodoma's Ghost had unimpressive gore effects and "failed spookiness" and an absurd ending. Thrower continued that of all the films of the era that stir the notion of a "haunted film", such as Demons (1985), The Purple Rose of Cairo (1985), Anguish (1987) and TerrorVision (1986), Fulci's film was "without a doubt the most insipid example."
