= Lucio Fulci =

Italian filmmaker (1927–1996)

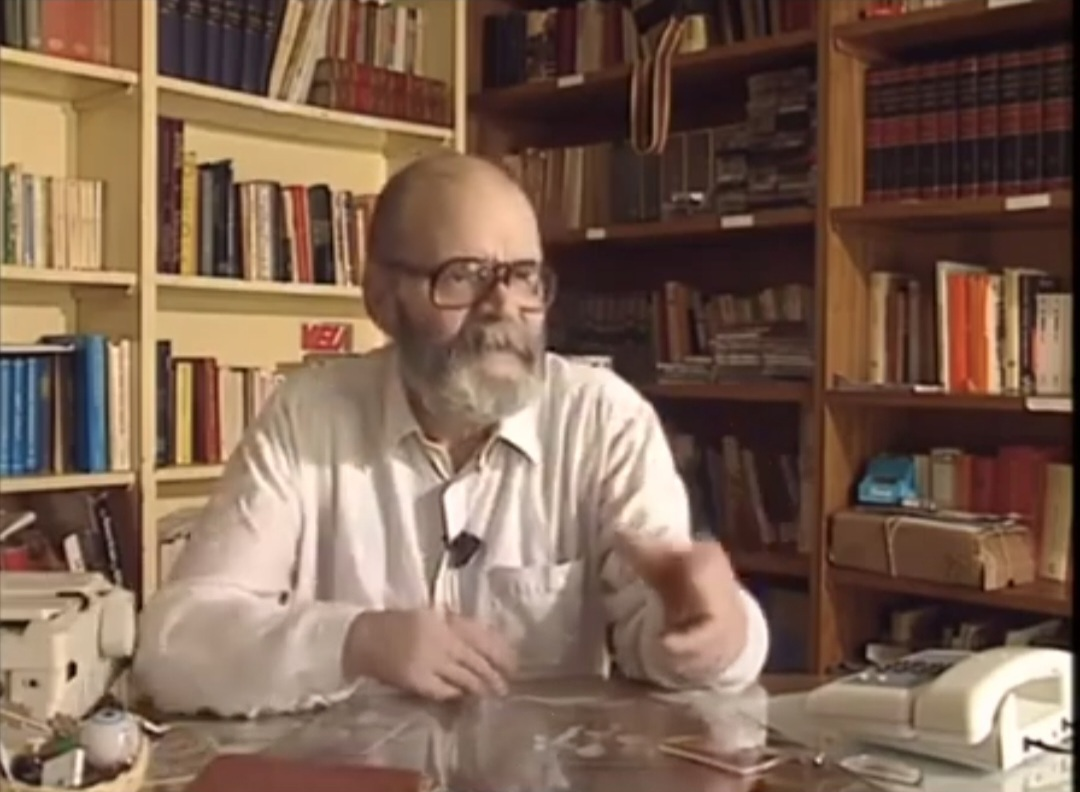
- Fulci in 1995
- Born: 17 June 1927; Rome, Kingdom of Italy
- Died: 13 March 1996 (aged 68); Rome, Italy
- Resting place: Cimitero Laurentino, Rome, Italy
- Other name: Louis Fuller
- Occupations: Film director; screenwriter; actor
- Years active: 1950–1991
- Spouse: Marina Fulci (m. 1958; died 1969)
- Children: 2

Signature
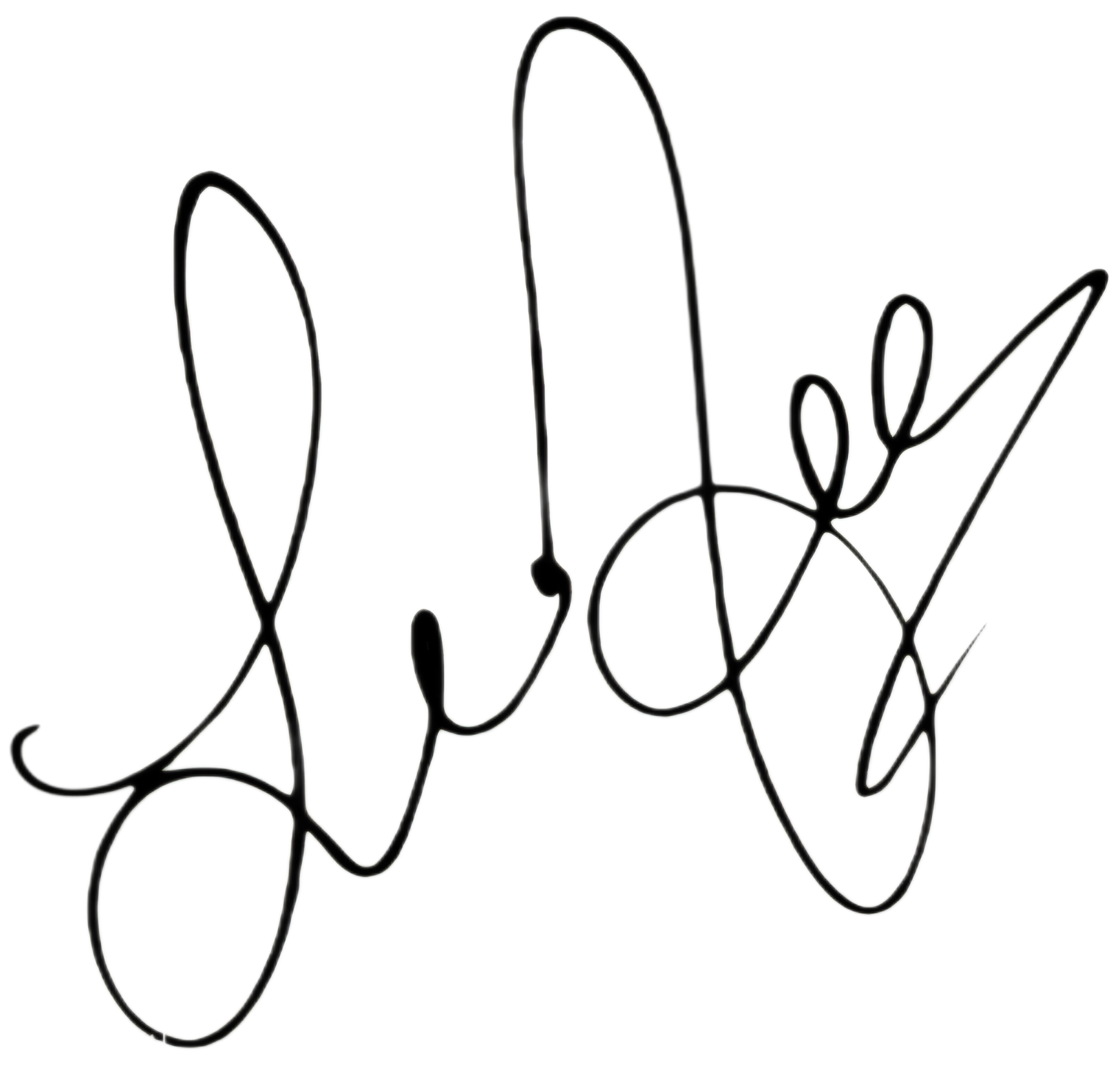

Lucio Fulci (Italian: [ˈluːtʃo ˈfultʃi]; 17 June 1927 – 13 March 1996) was an Italian film director, screenwriter, and actor. Although he worked in a wide array of genres through a career spanning nearly five decades, including comedies and spaghetti Westerns, he garnered an international cult following for his giallo and horror films.

His most notable films include the Gates of Hell trilogy—City of the Living Dead (1980), The Beyond (1981), and The House by the Cemetery (1981)—as well as Massacre Time (1966), One on Top of the Other (1969), Beatrice Cenci (1969), A Lizard in a Woman's Skin (1971), Don't Torture a Duckling (1972), White Fang (1973), Four of the Apocalypse (1975), Sette note in nero (1977), Zombi 2 (1979), Contraband (1980), The New York Ripper (1982), Murder Rock (1984), and A Cat in the Brain (1990). Although a number of films over the years were said to have been "co-produced" by Fulci, he was just allowing them to use his name to promote the films (with the exception of City of the Living Dead, which he did actively attempt to obtain some funding for).

Owing to his brand of expressive visuals and unconventional storytelling, Lucio Fulci has been called "The Poet of the Macabre" by genre critics and scholars, originally a reference to Edgar Allan Poe, whose work he freely adapted in The Black Cat (1981). The high level of graphic violence in many of his films, especially Zombi 2, The Beyond, Contraband and The New York Ripper, has also earned him the nickname "The Godfather of Gore", which he shares with Herschell Gordon Lewis.

== Life and career ==
=== The early years ===
Lucio Fulci was born in Trastevere, Rome, on 17 June 1927. His mother Lucia was from a poor but reputable Sicilian, politically anti-fascist family from Messina, Sicily. She had earlier eloped to Rome with a cousin of hers, who she later left to raise their child (Lucio) alone. Lucio was raised Roman Catholic by his mother and a female housekeeper. He attended the Naval College in Venice, and near the end of World War II, completed his studies back in Rome at the Giulio Cesare State Classical School. He was interested in art, music, film, football, and had a love for sailing.

His mother encouraged him to be a lawyer, but he wound up going to medical school instead. After studying medicine for a time, he dropped out before completing his training, deciding there was more money to be made in the filmmaking industry He worked initially as an art critic, writing for Gazzetta delle Arti and Il Messaggero, and also joined the critical art group il Gruppo Arte Sociale. In the Fulci Talks interview filmed in Rome, Fulci mentions having in his youth met Truman Capote in Italy, who he said was reading books and spoke good Italian.

His interest in the arts led him to apply to the film school in Rome named Centro Sperimentale where he apprenticed, after which he worked first as a director of documentaries, then an assistant director of motion pictures, then a screenwriter working mainly in the Italian comedy field in the early 1950s. The famed Italian director Steno took Fulci under his wing and allowed him to assist in the making of a number of comedies starring Totò. He also directed a number of comedies starring the actors Franco and Ciccio.

=== Fulci's gialli and horror films ===
Fulci moved into directing giallo thrillers with Una sull'altra (1969), A Lizard in a Woman's Skin (1971) and Sette note in nero (The Psychic, 1977), as well as Spaghetti Westerns such as Four of the Apocalypse (1975) and Silver Saddle (1978), all of which were commercially successful and controversial in their depictions of graphic violence. Some of the special effects in A Lizard in a Woman's Skin involving mutilated dogs in a vivisection room were so realistic that Fulci was charged with animal cruelty; the charges were dropped when he produced the artificial canine puppets that were utilized in the film (created by special effects maestro Carlo Rambaldi).

His first film to gain significant notoriety in his native country, Don't Torture a Duckling (1972), combined scathing social commentary with the director's trademark graphic violence. Fulci had a Catholic upbringing and always referred to himself as a Catholic. Despite this, some of his movies (Beatrice Cenci, Don't Torture a Duckling, City of the Living Dead, etc.) have been viewed as having very anti-Catholic sentiment.

In 1979, he achieved his international breakthrough with Zombi 2, a violent zombie film that was marketed in European territories as a sequel to George Romero's Dawn of the Dead/Zombi (1978) with permission from neither Romero, nor Dario Argento who directed the European edit known as Zombi.

Several of Fulci's movies released in America were edited by the film distributor to ensure an R rating, such as The Beyond, which was originally released on video in severely edited form as Seven Doors of Death. Others were released unrated in order to avoid an X rating (as with Zombi 2 and House by the Cemetery) which would have restricted the films' target audiences to adults. The unrated films often played worldwide in drive-ins and grindhouses where they developed a cult following. Many of Fulci's horror films tend to contain "injury to the eye" sequences, in which a character's eyeball is either pierced or pulled out of its socket, usually in lingering, close-up detail.

=== Later career ===
Fulci travelled to the Philippines and spent six weeks shooting the film Zombi 3. Two opposing views were given for Fulci leaving the film, the first being an illness that left him unable to film and the second being that he was having disputes with producers. After completing filming, he would later state "(I) didn't finish making Zombie 3, but the reason wasn't anything to do with illness [...] there were arguments and so, I finished off an hour and a quarter of the film". Fulci stated that he could not get the script changed, which he deemed to be "dreadful", and modified it with his daughter. Claudio Fragasso stated that Fulci simplified his screenplay and shot a seventy-minute film which shocked producer Franco Gaudenzi.

By the second half of the 1980s, the Italian film industry was struggling with less theatrical distribution of films and productions being made to sell to foreign markets for television and home video. In some films, such as Gianni Martucci's The Red Monks, Fulci is credited as a "special effects supervisor" despite not showing up to set or preparing any special effects for the film. According to Martucci, Fulci "agreed to "present" the movie" as distributors required "a "heavy" name for foreign sales. By then Fulci had become a name, let's say exportable. He was already very ill, and I met him to talk to him about the project" While Fulci's health did get better, Martucci stated that "at that time he couldn't even speak, devoured as he was by cirrhosis."

A series was developed titled I maestri del thriller was developed with the aim of television and home video markets, which was originally going to be a set of ten films but only eight were made. Fulci was invited by cinematographer Silvano Tessicini to the series as the director had just moved from Rome to Castelnuovo di Porto and was experiencing health problems after returning from the production of Zombi 3. Tessicini lived in the nearby Morlupo and on visiting him stated that Fulci "was not well, and had a huge belly", a consequence of the liver disease that affected Fulci during the filming of Zombi 3. Fulci was initially hired on the film as a supervisor but submitted the idea to direct his own film, Touch of Death. When one of the directors walked away from the series, Fulci was invited to begin filming Sodoma's Ghost. It was filmed under the title Ghost Light and began shooting on 30 May 1988 with filming taking four weeks. Mario Bianchi was recruited by production supervisor Silvano Zignani to film some second unit scenes. According to Bianchi, "Fulci didn't leave the set until he finished the film" while also stating "I wouldn't say I shot half the film, but almost" while Michele De Angelis stated that Bianchi was only on set for a couple of days. Three days after filming Sodoma's Ghost, Fulci began work on Touch of Death which began filming on 22 June 1988. Another film in the series was Hansel e Gretel, which was originally set for Giovanni Simonelli to direct but after three weeks of filming only about 50 minutes of the film had been completed and large parts of the story were not filmed. Several weeks later Fulci was asked to supervise an additional week's shooting. According to the assistant director of the film Michele de Angelis,"Lucio shot everything. Simonelli stayed by his side, just watching...." Along with Fulci, Andrea Bianchi was reportedly recruited to work on the film as well. Fulci was credited in another film in the series: as a supervisor in the film Bloody Psycho by Leandro Lucchetti. Fulci did not discuss the film with the director and did not show up at the set of the film. Fulci would later use the gory footage of the titles in the series used in his film A Cat in the Brain. Fulci added new scenes where he played himself, a horror director who visits a psychiatrist who he does not realize is a serial killer. The films in the I maestri del thriller series were later released on VHS and DVD as Lucio Fulci presenta by the Formula Home Video label.

Fulci would also develop films for television as part of the series Le case maledette set up by producer Luciano Martino. The films were shot outside Rome with a schedule of four weeks each, with The House of Clocks filmed between 31 January and 25 February 1989. Immediately after finishing work on the film, Fulci started work on The Sweet House of Horrors which finished filming in March. The series was not shown in Italy and was released on VHS in 2000 and later shown on Italian satellite TV in 2006.

=== Fulci and Dario Argento ===
In the last decade of his life, Fulci suffered from emotional and physical health problems, reflected by a marked decline in the quality of his work. Fulci also continued to suffer during the late 1980s from recurring problems with diabetes and his liver. He hid the severity of his illness from his friends and associates so that he would not be deemed unemployable.

His wife's suicide in 1969 had always weighed heavily on him (she had killed herself with a gas oven after learning she had inoperable cancer). Fulci biographer Stephen Thrower wrote "The suicide of his wife in 1969 was followed not long after by the death of a daughter in a road accident", but neither of Fulci's daughters are deceased. Dario Argento is quoted as saying of Fulci "His life was terrible. His wife committed suicide, and his daughter was paralyzed because of an accident." In a 2023 interview with actors Giovanni Lombardo Radice and Silvia Collatina at the Romford Horror event, the two confirm that one of Fulci's daughters had an accident when she fell off a horse and was injured very badly and became temporarily paralyzed. This is also confirmed in the documentary Fulci for Fake.

Fulci and Argento met in 1994 at the Rome Fanta Festival and surprisingly agreed to collaborate on a horror film called Wax Mask, a loose remake of the 1953 Vincent Price horror classic House of Wax. Argento claimed he had heard about Fulci's miserable circumstances at the time and wanted to offer him a chance at a comeback. It is said that Argento was shocked at how thin and sickly Fulci appeared at their 1994 meeting, and said he felt very sorry for him.

Fulci collaborated with writer Daniele Stroppa to create a screenplay for Argento, whose insistence on increasing the violence and gore quotient was, unusually, opposed by Fulci. (Stroppa had co-written two of Fulci's earlier films, The House of Clocks and Voices from Beyond). Fulci was slated to also direct the film, but he died before filming could begin, due to a series of delays caused by Argento's involvement with his own project, The Stendhal Syndrome, at the time. Wax Mask was eventually directed by former special effects artist Sergio Stivaletti. The screenplay was entirely reworked by Stivaletti after Fulci's death, so the finished film contains significant changes to Fulci's original screenplay. Argento also hired Fulci's daughter Antonella to serve as an assistant art director on the film.

=== Death and legacy ===
Fulci died alone, in his sleep, in his apartment in Rome at around 2 pm on 13 March 1996 of a hyperglycemic diabetic coma, aged 68. Toward the end of his life, he had lost his house and was forced to move into a cramped apartment. Since Fulci had been so despondent in his later years, some believed that he may have intentionally allowed himself to die by not taking his glucose-controlling medication, but this is controversial. Dario Argento paid for Fulci's funeral arrangements. He was initially buried in Cimitero Flaminio, though his remains were later moved to Cimitero Laurentino; the epitaph on his crypt reads "I did it my way."

Fulci's films had remained generally ignored or dismissed for many years by the mainstream critics, who regarded his work as exploitation. However, genre fans appreciated his films as being stylish exercises in extreme gore. At least one of his films, The Beyond, has "amassed a large and dedicated following". In 1998, The Beyond was re-released to theaters by Quentin Tarantino, who has often cited the film, and Fulci himself, as a major source of inspiration. Fulci's earlier, lesser-known giallo Don't Torture a Duckling (1972) received some critical acclaim as well. Fulci regarded two of his films, Don't Torture a Duckling and Beatrice Cenci, as his best all-around work, and considered both Zombi 2 and The Beyond as the two films that forever catapulted him to cult film stardom. His daughter Camilla served as an assistant director on his last five films (from 1989 to 1991) and has gone on to become an assistant director in the Italian film industry.

Fulci made an appearance at the January 1996 Fangoria horror convention in New York City, two months before his death. Walking on crutches with a bandaged foot, he told attendees that he had had no idea his films were so popular outside of his native Italy, as hordes of starstruck gore fans braved blizzard conditions that weekend to meet him.

== Personal life ==
Fulci was Catholic. Discussing how his faith manifested in his films, in a 1982 interview he said that his later fantastique films were truest to his own philosophy; that "all Catholic literature is terribly anguished"; that he had found God in the misfortune of others; and that he "studied the horrible as Bergson studied laughter." According to his collaborator Dardano Sacchetti, Fulci told him during the preparation to Sette note in nero that he believed that destiny was inescapable, even when its outcome was known in advance.

== Filmography ==
Title	Year	Credited as				Notes	Ref(s)
Title	Year	Director	Screenwriter	Screen story author	Other	Notes	Ref(s)
The Last Days of Pompeii	1950				Yes	Associate producer	
Toto in the Moon	1958		Yes				
I ladri	1959	Yes	Yes	Yes			
Ragazzi del Juke-Box	1959	Yes	Yes	Yes	Yes	Actor	
Urlatori alla sbarra	1960	Yes	Yes	Yes			
Letto a tre piazze	1960			Yes			
Sanremo la grande sfida	1960				Yes	Actor	
Totò, Peppino e... la dolce vita	1961			Yes			
Colpo gobbo all'italiana	1962	Yes					
I due della legione	1962	Yes	Yes				
Le massaggiatrici	1962	Yes					
Uno strano tipo	1963	Yes	Yes				
The Swindlers	1963	Yes	Yes	Yes			
I maniaci	1964	Yes	Yes				
Two Escape from Sing Sing	1964	Yes	Yes				
Oh! Those Most Secret Agents!	1964	Yes	Yes				
I due pericoli pubblici	1964	Yes	Yes	Yes			
How We Got into Trouble with the Army	1965	Yes					
002 Operazione Luna	1965	Yes					
The Two Parachutists	1965	Yes	Yes				
How We Robbed the Bank of Italy	1966	Yes	Yes				
Massacre Time	1966	Yes					
Come rubammo la bomba atomica	1967	Yes					
Il lungo, il corto, il gatto	1967	Yes					
Operation St. Peter's	1967	Yes	Yes	Yes			
The Two Crusaders	1968		Yes				
Double Face	1969			Yes			
One on Top of the Other	1969	Yes	Yes	Yes	Yes	Actor	
Beatrice Cenci	1969	Yes	Yes	Yes			
A Lizard in a Woman's Skin	1971	Yes	Yes	Yes			
Trois milliards sans ascenseur	1972		Yes				
The Eroticist	1972	Yes	Yes	Yes			
Don't Torture a Duckling	1972	Yes		Yes			
White Fang	1973	Yes					
Challenge to White Fang	1974	Yes	Yes				
Four of the Apocalypse	1975	Yes					
Dracula in the Provinces	1975	Yes	Yes	Yes			
My Sister in Law	1976	Yes			Yes	Actor	
Sette note in nero	1977	Yes					
Silver Saddle	1978	Yes					
Zombi 2	1979	Yes			Yes	Actor	
Contraband	1980	Yes	Yes		Yes	Actor	
City of the Living Dead	1980	Yes	Yes	Yes	Yes	Actor	
The Black Cat	1981	Yes	Yes				
The Beyond	1981	Yes	Yes		Yes	Actor; released in the U.S. as Seven Doors of Death with Fulci credited as Louis Fuller	
The House by the Cemetery	1981	Yes	Yes		Yes	Actor	
The New York Ripper	1982	Yes	Yes		Yes	Actor	
Manhattan Baby	1982	Yes	Yes		Yes	Actor	
Conquest	1983	Yes					
Warriors of the Year 2072	1984	Yes	Yes				
Murder Rock	1984	Yes	Yes	Yes	Yes	Actor	
The Devil's Honey	1986	Yes	Yes	Yes	Yes	Actor	
The Curse	1987				Yes	Associate producer and special effects	
Zombi 3	1988	Yes					
Aenigma	1988	Yes	Yes	Yes	Yes	Actor	
Cat in the Brain	1990	Yes	Yes	Yes	Yes	Actor	
Voices from Beyond	1994	Yes	Yes	Yes	Yes	Actor	
Wax Mask	1997		Yes				
Ci troviamo in galleria	—N/a		Yes				
A Day in Court	—N/a		Yes	Yes			
An American in Rome	—N/a		Yes	Yes			
Hanno rubato un tram	—N/a		Yes				
Io sono la Primula Rossa	—N/a		Yes				
Sins of Casanova	—N/a		Yes	Yes			
The Letters Page	—N/a		Yes	Yes	Yes	Actor	
Toto in Hell	—N/a		Yes				
Maid, Thief and Guard	—N/a		Yes	Yes			
Hector the Mighty	—N/a		Yes				
Night Club	—N/a			Yes			

=== Television films ===
Title	Year	Credited as				Notes	Ref(s)
Title	Year	Director	Screenwriter	Screen story author	Other	Notes	Ref(s)
The Trap	1985		Yes				
The House of Clocks	—N/a	Yes		Yes			
The Sweet House of Horrors	—N/a	Yes		Yes			

=== Direct-to-video films ===
Note: Films listed as "—" in the year column are not in chronological order

Title	Year	Credited as				Notes	Ref(s)
Title	Year	Director	Screenwriter	Screen story author	Other	Notes	Ref(s)
Sodoma's Ghost	1990	Yes	Yes	Yes			
Touch of Death	1990	Yes	Yes	Yes			
Demonia	1990	Yes	Yes	Yes	Yes	Actor	
Door to Silence	1994	Yes	Yes				

== Accolades ==
Year	Award	Category	Film	Result
1983	Fantasporto Film Festival	International Fantasy Film Award	The House by the Cemetery	Nominated
1986	Avoriaz Fantastic Film Festival	Fear Section Award	Murder Rock	Won
