= Touch of Death (Lucio Fulci film) =

Italian horror film by Lucio Fulci

- Shriek Show DVD Cover
- Directed by: Lucio Fulci
- Screenplay by: Lucio Fulci
- Story by: Lucio Fulci
- Produced by: Lugi Nannerini; Antononio Lucidi
- Starring: Brett Halsey; Ria De Simone; Al Cliver
- Cinematography: Silvano Tessicini
- Edited by: Vincenzo Tomassi
- Music by: Carlo Maria Cordio
- Production company: Cine Duck
- Release dates: October 1990 (France); 14 June 1991 (Italy)
- Running time: 86 minutes
- Country: Italy

Touch of Death (Italian: Quando Alice ruppe lo specchio) is a direct-to-video Italian horror film directed by Lucio Fulci. The film was developed as part of a series for direct-to video and television films titled I maestri del thriller which had eight other films in the series. Fulci was invited to join the project originally as a supervisor, but brought in his own story for Touch of Death which began filming on 22 June 1988. The films were later released to home video under the heading of "Lucio Fulci presenta" (transl. Lucio Fulci presents) by Formula Home Video, but were sued by the producer Carlo Alberto Alfieri who owned the home video rights. The films in the series were later released by Avo Film on VHS and DVD.

== Plot ==
Cannibal psychopath Lester Parson regularly abducts and mutilates women, eating specific cuts and disposing of the rest in his backyard to his pigs. He converses schizophrenically with himself via tape recordings of his voice. He is also being hounded by Randy, a loan shark whom he owes money to after accruing bad gambling debts.

Lester picks up Maggie MacDonald, an alcoholic whom he invites over to his house for dinner. His attempt to poison her is thwarted because Maggie is so drunk when she arrives at his place that she spills her wine onto the floor. On the next attempt, she giddily mixes up his glass of wine with hers. He loses patience on the third try when she swallows the poisoned glassful, only to vomit before it can take effect. As Maggie excuses herself to the bathroom to clean up, he attacks her with a wooden stick. Her scalp splits apart, and she runs screaming from the bathroom with blood streaming down her face. He chases her down the corridor bashing her head repeatedly, causing skin to rip away from her face, and a single bloodshot eyeball to roll out of her head onto the floor. Playing dead for a few seconds, Maggie rises when Parson's back is turned and makes another dash for the front door, but is rounded up and punched unconscious. Furious and exhausted, the killer shoves her head into an oven and switches it on, leaving her slumped with her flesh slowly melting off her face. Parson shoves Maggie's body into the trunk of his Mercedes. But he has to chop off the corpse's feet to get the body to fit right.

After ditching the body at a construction site, Parson is observed by a tramp, who attempts to blackmail him. Not to be deterred, he follows the derelict as he leaves. Catching up with him on a stretch of country road, Parson puts his foot on the gas pedal and pursues the terrified man, eventually crunching him under the vehicle. The next day, Parson sees on the TV that the tramp survived long enough to give the police a description of his attacker. Parson decides to change his image by shaving off his beard and wearing contact lenses in place of his eyeglasses.

Parson's next victim is Alice Shogun, a middle-aged woman who sings opera during sex. The weary killer strangles her to death with one of her stockings. Placing the body in the front seat of his car, Parson drives away, only to get pulled over by a motorcycle policeman and get a speeding ticket. The policeman does not notice that the woman with Parson is dead.

Taking Alice's jewelry with him, he tries pawning it only to discover it is all fake. He tries to meet a horse fixer at a racing stables for a tip about putting a bet on a horse, but the person never shows up. When more TV announcements give further descriptions of the killer, Parson is forced to change his image again by dyeing his black hair brown and wearing tinted eyeglasses.

Sitting at home, Parson responds to an unlikely invitation to "come on over" from Virginia, a similarly bored, lonely, wealthy, but younger woman than his previous victims, when she dials his phone number by accident. Even though she seems eager for intimacy, Lester finds himself repulsed by a scar on her upper lip. After ringing up another gambling debt to Randy, Parson decides to kill Virginia to steal whatever money and jewelry she has on her and flee the country.

The following evening, Parson meets Virginia in her apartment suite for dinner. When he is about to kill her, she shoots him in the chest after seeing another broadcast of the latest description of the killer and recognizing Parson. Mortally wounded, Parson crawls away, ends up in a building garage, converses with his other self, a shadow on the wall, and dies as it converges with him.

== Production ==
=== Pre-production ===
By the second half of the 1980s, Italian cinema was finding it more difficult to get theatrical distribution. As films released to home video did not need to be sent to the rating board for a theatrical screening certificate, some productions including Touch of Death saved money by releasing films direct-to-video. The film was part of a series titled I maestri del thriller that was aimed directly at television and home video release. Producer Carlo Alberto Alfieri presented the project to Luciano Martino who rejected it, and later made a deal with August Caminito's Scena International. Caminito's company then contacted Distribuzione Alpha Cinematographica and Cine Duck and sold television rights to the series to Reteitalia.

Cinematographer Silvano Tessicini got director Lucio Fulci involved in the series. Fulci had just returned from the Philippines after shooting Zombi 3 and was ill. Tessicini initially suggested Fulci to be part of the production as a supervisor, but Fulci submitted his own story, Touch of Death.

=== Filming ===
The other films in the series included Giovanni Simonelli's Hansel e Gretel, Leandro Lucchetti's Bloody Psycho, Andrea Bianchi's Massacre, Enzo Milioni's Luna di sangue, Mario Bianchi's Non avere paura della zia Marta, Umberto Lenzi's Le porte dell'inferno and Fulci's Sodoma's Ghost. The budget of the films varies per source with Alfieri stating each film had a 300 to 350 million Italian lire budget, while production manager Silvano Zignani stated they were about 207 million and Fulci stating it was 200 to 300 million. The films were shot in 16 mm film and blown-up to 35mm and were shot in three to four weeks each with the films having generally the same crew and some recurring cast members.

Filming for Touch of Death began on 22 June 1988, shortly after Fulci finished filming Sodoma's Ghost. The film was shot around Rome and Vides Studios. Fulci later spoke negatively about both films stating that there were so many shots in the film to get the minimum running time of the films complete. Fucli also argued with the producers on set while the producers were unhappy with him as Fulci was continuously behind schedule.

== Release ==
All the films in the series were released to home video by Formula Home Video under the heading "Lucio Fulci presenta" (transl. Lucio Fulci presents). Alfieri sued Formula Home Video for releasing them as he owned the home video rights to the series. Formula went bankrupt and the series was later released on VHS and DVD by Avo Film who purchased the home video rights to them.

Touch of Death was released in France on home video as Soupçons de Mort (transl. Suspicions of Death) in October 1990. It was shown on Italian tv channel Telecity on June 14, 1991 as Quando Alice ruppe lo specchio.

It was released in Germany under the title Alice Broke the Mirror.

== Reception ==
From contemporary reviews, Cyrille Giraud of Mad Movies found the film "not bad at all" while saying that Fulci has abandoned the large amount of gore of his previous work and welcomed Fulci's more "cerebral approach."

In his book Beyond Terror: The Films of Lucio Fulci, author Stephen Thrower described Touch of Death as combining "inept gore scenes" with poor comic timing of actor Brett Halsey, leading him to describe as "a strong contender for Lucio Fulci's worst horror film."
