= List of Italian films of 1984 =

A list of films produced in Italy in 1984 (see 1984 in film):

== Films ==
Title	Director	Cast	Genre	Notes
L'allenatore nel pallone	Sergio Martino	Lino Banfi, Gigi & Andrea, Licinia Lentini	Comedy	
Amarsi un po'	Carlo Vanzina	Claudio Amendola, Tahnee Welch, Virna Lisi	Romantic comedy	
A tu per tu	Sergio Corbucci	Paolo Villaggio, Johnny Dorelli	Comedy	
Aurora	Maurizio Ponzi	Sophia Loren, Daniel J. Travanti	drama	
Bertoldo, Bertoldino e Cacasenno	Mario Monicelli	Ugo Tognazzi, Lello Arena, Maurizio Nichetti, Alberto Sordi	Comedy	
Bianca	Nanni Moretti	Nanni Moretti, Laura Morante, Roberto Vezzosi	Comedy	
Blastfighter	Lamberto Bava	Michael Sopkiw, George Eastman	Action	
Good King Dagobert	Dino Risi	Coluche, Michel Serrault, Ugo Tognazzi, Carole Bouquet	Comedy	French-Italian co-production
Carmen	Francesco Rosi	Julia Migenes, Plácido Domingo	Opera	
One Hundred Days in Palermo	Giuseppe Ferrara	Lino Ventura, Giuliana De Sio, Stefano Satta Flores	crime drama	
Champagne in paradiso	Aldo Grimaldi	Al Bano and Romina Power, Renzo Montagnani	Musicarello	
Chewingum	Biagio Proietti	Massimo Ciavarro, Isabella Ferrari	Teen comedy	
Cinderella '80	Roberto Malenotti	Bonnie Bianco, Adolfo Celi	Romantic comedy	
Claretta	Pasquale Squitieri]	Claudia Cardinale, Giuliano Gemma, Catherine Spaak	Biographical drama	
Code Name: Wild Geese	Antonio Margheriti	Lewis Collins, Lee Van Cleef, Ernest Borgnine, Klaus Kinski		
College	Castellano & Pipolo	Christian Vadim, Federica Moro	Comedy	
Cop in Drag	Bruno Corbucci	Tomas Milian, Bombolo	Crime-comedy	
Crime in Formula One	Bruno Corbucci	Tomas Milian, Bombolo	Crime-comedy	
Cuori nella tormenta	Enrico Oldoini	Carlo Verdone, Lello Arena, Marina Suma	Comedy	
Domani mi sposo	Francesco Massaro	Jerry Calà, Isabella Ferrari	Comedy	
Double Trouble	E.B. Clucher	Terence Hill, Bud Spencer	action comedy	
I due carabinieri	Carlo Verdone	Carlo Verdone, Enrico Montesano, Massimo Boldi	Crime-comedy	
Everybody in Jail	Alberto Sordi	Alberto Sordi, Joe Pesci, Dalila Di Lazzaro	comedy	
The Final Executioner	Romolo Guerrieri	Woody Strode	post-apocalyptic	
The Future Is Woman	Marco Ferreri	Ornella Muti, Hanna Schygulla, Niels Arestrup	Drama	
Henry IV	Marco Bellocchio	Marcello Mastroianni, Claudia Cardinale	Drama	
Kaos	Paolo and Vittorio Taviani	Franco and Ciccio, Regina Bianchi	comedy-drama	
Monster Shark	Lamberto Bava	Michael Sopkiw, Gianni Garko	natural horror	
Murder Rock	Lucio Fulci	Olga Karlatos, Ray Lovelock	Giallo	
La neve nel bicchiere	Florestano Vancini	Massimo Ghini	Drama	
Nothing Left to Do But Cry	Massimo Troisi, Roberto Benigni	Massimo Troisi, Roberto Benigni	Comedy	
Once Upon a Time in America	Sergio Leone	Robert De Niro, James Woods, Elizabeth McGovern,	Drama	
Pianoforte	Francesca Comencini	Giulia Boschi, Marie-Christine Barrault	Drama	De Sica award at the 41st Venice International Film Festival
A Proper Scandal	Pasquale Festa Campanile	Ben Gazzara, Giuliana De Sio, Vittorio Caprioli	Drama	Entered the 41st Venice International Film Festival
Il ragazzo di campagna	Castellano & Pipolo	Renato Pozzetto, Massimo Boldi	Comedy	
Rats: Night of Terror	Bruno Mattei	Geretta Geretta	post-apocalyptic	
Softly, Softly	Lina Wertmüller	Enrico Montesano, Veronica Lario	Comedy	
Summer Games	Bruno Cortini	Massimo Ciavarro, Corinne Cléry, Natasha Hovey	Comedy	
Sole nudo	Tonino Cervi	Tânia Alves	erotic	
Tuareg – The Desert Warrior	Enzo G. Castellari	Mark Harmon, Antonio Sabàto	adventure-action	
Vacanze in America	Carlo Vanzina	Jerry Calà, Christian De Sica, Edwige Fenech	Comedy	
Vediamoci chiaro	Luciano Salce	Paolo Villaggio, Eleonora Giorgi, Janet Agren	Comedy	
The Violent Breed	Fernando Di Leo	Henry Silva, Harrison Muller, Woody Strode	War	
Warriors of the Year 2072	Lucio Fulci	Jared Martin, Fred Williamson, Eleonora Brigliadori	Science fiction	
