= Glenn Saxson =

Dutch actor and film producer

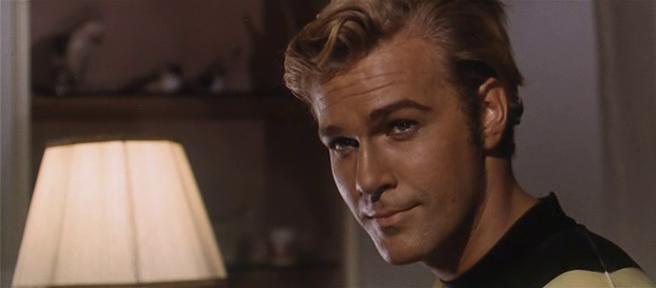
- Glenn Saxon in Kriminal
- Born: Roel Bos; March 5, 1942 (age 84); The Hague, Netherlands
- Occupations: Actor, film producer

Roel Bos, better known by his stage name Glenn Saxson, is a Dutch actor and film producer. Bos moved to Italy in 1964 and starred in several Western films as well as the lead in the superhero film Kriminal and its sequel Il marchio di Kriminal. Following these roles he continued acting in Italian and German productions until the late 1960s. He began work in the 1970s as a producer as he had "more artistic ideas in mind", and worked with director Sergio Nasca, producing his films The Profiteer and Vergine e di nome Maria.

== Biography ==
Bos was born in The Hague in Netherlands. Bos arrived in Italy in 1964 and began work doing photo comics and television commercials. His first film appearance was an uncredited small role in Luchino Visconti's film Sandra. Bos recalled that the film was only one day's work but was interested in the project as it involved Claudia Cardinale and was "directed by the great Visconti".

Bos then began to star in Westerns, with his first role being the leading man in Edoardo Mulargia's Go With God, Gringo. Bos recalled the origin of his name due to Western actors being obliged to take on American pseudonyms. He initially wanted to be credited as Roel Bos but the producer and he would eventually agree on Glenn Saxson. Bos would go on to play one of the many Django characters in Italian cinema, including starring in Django Shoots First by Alberto De Martino.

Bos would then work on his third film, Kriminal after the two Westerns, he made a screen test with director Umberto Lenzi who Bos recalled wanted a younger character to portray Kriminal than he was presented in the comics. Bos would warned in advance that working with Lenzi could be difficult but later recalled that "working with Lenzi was easy". Bos would return for the sequel film Il marchio di Kriminal released in 1967 and directed by Fernando Cerchio.

Italian film historian and critic Roberto Curti described Bos's career became "somehow stagnated" after the two Kriminal. He followed them with the jungle adventure film Luana, the Girl Tarzan and three more Westerns: The Magnificent Texan, Il lungo giorno del massacro, and Carogne si nasce. Towards the end of the 1960s, he began starring in German sex comedies directed by Franz Antel and Sergio Bergonzelli such as School of Erotic Enjoyment before stopping his acting career. Bos explained that he had "more artistic ideas in mind" and began producing during the 1970s. and began work with the television company which produced programs for RAI and the television film Donnarumma all'assalto. Among the films Bos produced were The Profiteer by Sergio Nasca which was shown at Film Festivals around the world including Cannes, San Francisco, Brussels, and Chicago. Bos then produced Nasca's next film Vergine e di nome Maria which also was shown at various film festivals, but received complaints from censors with Bos exclaiming "for no reason at all because the film was not at all blasphemous as they claimed."

== Select filmography ==
Year	Title	Role	Director(s)	Notes	Ref(s)
1966	Go With God, Gringo	Ringo	Edoardo Mulargia		
1966	Django Shoots First	Django	Alberto de Martino		
1966	Kriminal	Kriminal	Umberto Lenzi		
1967	Il marchio di Kriminal	Kriminal	Fernando Cerchio		
1967	The Magnificent Texan	Manuel Lopez	Luigi Capuano		
