= Blue Belle =

1976 British film by Massimo Dallamano

La fine dell'innocenza
- Italian theatrical release poster
- Directed by: Massimo Dallamano
- Screenplay by: Massimo Dallamano; Marcello Coscia
- Story by: Massimo Dallamano; Marcello Coscia
- Produced by: Harry Alan Towers
- Starring: Annie Belle; Felicity Devonshire; Ciro Ippolito; Charles Fawcett
- Cinematography: Franco Delli Colli
- Edited by: Nicholas Wentworth
- Music by: Franco Bixio; Vince Tempera; Fabio Frizzi
- Production companies: Coralta Cinematografica; Italian International Film; Barongreen
- Distributed by: P.I.C. Produzione Intercontinentali Cinematografiche
- Release date: 1976
- Countries: United Kingdom; Italy
- Language: English

Blue Belle (also known as Annie, Teenage Emanuelle, The End of Innocence and La fine dell'innocenza) is a 1976 drama film directed by Massimo Dallamano and starring Annie Belle, Felicity Devonshire, and Maria Rohm. It was written by Dallamano and Marcello Coscia.

== Premise ==
Annie, the mistress of a middle-aged financier, accompanies him on a trip to Hong Kong. When his business interests collapse Annie ends up destitute. She is befriended by a group of socialites and begins her rite of passage in their world.

== Cast ==
- Annie Belle as Annie
- Felicity Devonshire as Linda
- Ciro Ippolito as Angelo
- Charles Fawcett as Michael
- Al Cliver as Philip
- Maria Rohm as Susan
- Linda Ho as Genevieve
- Yao Lin Chen as Chen
- Rik Battaglia as Superintendent
- Ines Pellegrini as Sarah
- Linda Slade as Caroline
- Tim Street as Harry
- Ted Thomas as George
- Patrizia Banti as Su

== Reception ==
The Monthly Film Bulletin wrote: "Blue Belle slides comfortably into the apparently still chic hand-me-downs of big sisters Emmanuelle, Black Emanuelle and Vanessa, while conducting her own search for truth, sexual fulfilment and box-office receipts in the ever-dependable Orient. Massimo Dallamano (alias Jack Dalmas when he photographed Leone's Fistful of Dollars and For a Few Dollars More) directs in the current soft-core format: a combination of over-upholstered emptiness and frosty sincerity that effectively reduces characters, locations and story to the level of scenery. Actress Annie Belle re-enacts some of her 'real-life adventures' well enough, but Ines Pellegrini's mysterious features (she played Zumurrud in Pasolini's Arabian Nights) lend this voyage its only real spirituality."
