= Metamorphosis (1990 Italian film) =

1989 film by George Eastman

- U.S home video release poster
- Directed by: George Eastman (as G. L. Eastman)
- Screenplay by: George Eastman (as G. L. Eastman)
- Produced by: Donatella Donati
- Starring: Gene LeBrock; Catherine Baranov; Harry Cason; David Wicker; Stephen Brown
- Cinematography: Gianlorenzo Battaglia (as Lorenzo Battaglia)
- Edited by: Rosanna Landi (as Kathleen Stratton)
- Music by: Luigi Ceccarelli
- Production company: Filmirage
- Release date: January 1990; (video release)
- Running time: 96 minutes
- Country: Italy
- Language: English

Metamorphosis (Italian: DNA formula letale) is a 1990 Italian body horror film written and directed by Luigi Montefiori under the pseudonym G. L. Eastman. It is the only film directed by Montefiori, best known for his career as an actor under the pseudonym George Eastman, although he had previously served as an uncredited director on 2020 Texas Gladiators.

== Plot ==
Geneticist Peter Houseman, professor at a private university, is involved in studies on DNA with the support of his friend Mike and his young collaborator Willy, developing a serum he claims could be capable of preventing aging and defeating death. However, a commission decides to examine his continued requests for funding. Among the members stand out the elderly Professor Lloyd, very envious of Peter, and Inspector Sally, for whom Peter immediately shows attraction. The commission's skepticism and bureaucracy lead Peter to test the serum containing the modified DNA he has created on himself.

At first the experiment seems to have a positive result; Peter feels increasingly stronger and begins a relationship with Sally, although her son Tommy immediately shows hostility towards him. Shortly after, however, Peter starts showing episodes of violence. First he goes to a club where he brutally beats a prostitute, without remembering what happened. Then Patricia, a flirtatious student who had tried to seduce him, is raped and then strangled. Meanwhile, his body also begins to degenerate and acquire reptilian traits.

Hit by a police car, Peter is admitted to a hospital, where he goes through a phase of premature aging that weakens him greatly. He claims that as a result of his experiment, he will forever remain whatever he becomes into and will never die. Kept under observation by doctors Mike and Lloyd, the latter hypothesizes that his body is regressing at an unspecified point in man's evolutionary history. Now looking monstrous, Peter escapes from the hospital, kills Lloyd and Willy, and discovers that his body needs human blood to stay strong. He kidnaps Tommy and then returns to the university lab, leaving a trail of death and blood in his wake, to make one last attempt to correct the experiment. However, Tommy destroys the bottle containing the serum and, pursued by Peter, escapes helped by his mother, who arrives at the scene. Tommy and Sally manage to escape outside where Mike and the police are waiting. Peter, who has now turned into an anthropomorphic dinosaur-like monster, opens the door and is shot by the police, before completely decomposing.

Some time later, Tommy shows his mother a lizard that he keeps in a box. When Sally tells him to let it be free or otherwise it will die, the boy responds that it will never die, implying that the lizard is a surviving Peter.

== Cast ==
- Gene LeBrock as Peter Houseman
- Catherine Baranov as Sally Donnelly
- Harry Cason as Mike
- David Wicker as Willy
- Jason Arnold as Tommy
- Stephen Brown as Professor Lloyd
- Tom Story as Professor Huston
- Anna Colona as Patricia
- Wally Doyle as Inspector
- Laura Gemser as Prostitute
- Serina Steinberg as Patricia's friend
- Wayne Potrafka as Old Professor
- Tim Wright as Hopkins
- Allison Stokes as Alice

== Reception ==
Various reviews of the film highlighted that the film was largely derivative of David Cronenberg's The Fly. Scott Aaron Stine in The Gorehound's Guide to Splatter Films of the 1980s wrote that the film "holds promise early on, despite being entirely derivative of Cronenberg's The Fly. Unfortunately, once the interesting premise has been established, it quickly degenerates into an '80s take on tacky '50s style horror films. Stiff acting, an obnoxious soundtrack, crappy make-up effects, and a not-as-menacing-as-they'd-like-you-to-think-it-is papier-maché monster make the viewing experience that much more wretched." Stine also said of Montefiore, "And, yes, he should've stuck to acting." Clive Davis in Spinegrinder: The Movies Most Critics Won’t Write About cites the film as "boring FLY remake rip-off."

Fantafilm writes: "Directorial debut of actor and screenwriter Montefiori under the pseudonym George L. Eastman. The story he chooses, centered on genetic mutation, is halfway between The Fly (and its prequels and sequels) and Dr. Jekyll and Mr. Hyde. Specialized critics, usually not very kind to Italian forays into fanta-horror, have highlighted in the film a medium technical skill in the construction of images and an original reference to the themes of David Cronenberg.

The Lexikon des internationalen Films (which reviewed the film under its German title Lizard) also compared the film to David Cronenberg's The Fly, stating that the film "largely forgoes the unpleasant shock effect" of said film, but fails to achieve the "tension and consistency of its template."
