= Dinosaur Valley =

Dinosaur Valley may refer to:

- Dinosaur Valley State Park, Texas
- Drumheller, Alberta, Canada
- Nong Nooch Dinosaur Valley, Thailand

== See also ==
- Massacre in Dinosaur Valley, 1985 film
