= Giuseppe Aquari =

Italian cinematographer

- Born: 1 January 1916; Rome, Italy
- Died: 30 December 1982 (aged 66); Rome, Italy
- Occupation: Cinematographer

Giuseppe Aquari (1 January 1916 – 30 December 1982) was an Italian film cinematographer.

== Life and career ==
Born in Rome into a noble family, Aquari studied as an engineer and then enrolled at the Centro Sperimentale di Cinematografia, graduating as an operator. He began his film career in 1942, working as an operator in Luigi Chiarini's La locandiera. After several years in which Aquari worked mainly for documentaries, in 1952 he made his debut as a cinematographer in the melodrama film Final Pardon. From then he worked in dozens of films as well as in commercials and art documentaries. He died on 30 December 1982, shortly before undergoing a major surgery.

== Selected filmography ==
- Final Pardon (1952)
- Love and Troubles (1958)
- The Hunchback of Rome (1960)
- Le ambiziose (1961)
- Congo vivo (1962)
- The Changing of the Guard (1962)
- Terror in the Crypt (1964)
- Te lo leggo negli occhi (1965)
- An Angel for Satan (1966)
- For a Few Dollars Less (1966)
- Kill the Wicked! (1967)
- Revenge for Revenge (1968)
- Something Creeping in The Dark (1971)
- The Profiteer (1974)
- The Killer Reserved Nine Seats (1974)
- Frankenstein - Italian Style (1975)
- Malía (1975)
- Loves, Beds and Betrayals (1977)
- Stato interessante (1977)
- The Roses of Danzig (1979)
- Terror Express (1979)
- Il paramedico (1982)
