= Il paramedico =

- Directed by: Sergio Nasca
- Written by: Sergio Nasca; Enrico Montesano; Laura Toscano; Gianfranco Manfredi
- Produced by: Fulvio Lucisano
- Starring: Enrico Montesano; Edwige Fenech
- Cinematography: Giuseppe Aquari
- Music by: Armando Trovajoli
- Release date: 1982
- Language: Italian

Il paramedico (The Paramedic) is a 1982 Italian comedy film directed by Sergio Nasca.

== Plot ==
Mario Miglio, a penniless nurse, accidentally wins a Fiat Argenta. The new machine helps him to conquer Vittoria, the beautiful wife of the banker Pinna, but it also causes him several troubles, as terrorists steal it: for a misunderstanding, Mario himself is mistaken for one of them.

== Cast ==
- Enrico Montesano as Mario Miglio
- Edwige Fenech as Nina Miglio
- Daniela Poggi as Vittoria
- Rossano Brazzi as Augusto Pinna
- Marco Messeri as Spartaco
- Leo Gullotta as Deputy Prosecutor
- Enzo Robutti as Police Commissioner
- Mauro Di Francesco as Terrorist
- Enzo Cannavale as Lawyer Generoso Gallina
- Enzo Liberti as Doorman
- Franco Diogene as Palletta
- Carlo Monni as Digos Agent

== See also ==
- List of Italian films of 1982
