= Cop in Drag =

1984 Italian crime comedy film

- Italian theatrical release poster by Renato Casaro
- Directed by: Bruno Corbucci
- Written by: Bruno Corbucci; Mario Amendola
- Starring: Tomas Milian
- Cinematography: Marcello Masciocchi
- Edited by: Daniele Alabiso
- Music by: Fabio Frizzi
- Release date: 15 August 1984
- Running time: 96 minutes
- Country: Italy
- Language: Italian

Delitto al Blue Gay, internationally released as Cop in Drag, is a 1984 Italian "poliziottesco"-comedy film directed by Bruno Corbucci. It is the eleventh and final chapter in the Nico Giraldi film series starred by Tomas Milian.

== Plot ==
Rome, Italy early 1980s. A man who worked at the Blue Gay, a transvestite cabaret, is found murdered, strangled. Marshal Nico Giraldi (Tomas Milian) is responsible for investigating the death by infiltrating in the Roman Gay community.

== Cast ==
- Tomas Milian as Nico Giraldi
- Bombolo as Venticello
- Olimpia Di Nardo as Angela
- Vinicio Diamanti Vinicio Diamanti as Colomba Lamar
- Anita Kupsch as Brigitte
- Holger Münzer as Kurt Linder
- Marina Hedman as The Bait
- Enzo Garinei as The Judge

== See also ==
- List of Italian films of 1984
