= Revenge for Revenge =

1968 film

- Directed by: Mario Colucci
- Written by: Mario Colucci
- Produced by: Natalino Gullo
- Starring: John Ireland
- Cinematography: Giuseppe Aquari
- Edited by: Enzo Micarelli
- Music by: Angelo Francesco Lavagnino
- Release date: 1968
- Country: Italy

Revenge for Revenge (Italian: Vendetta per vendetta), also known as Vengeance for Vengeance, is a 1968 Italian Spaghetti Western film written and directed by Mario Colucci and starring John Ireland.

== Cast ==
- John Ireland as Major Bowen
- John Hamilton as Chaliko/Shalako
- Loredana Nusciak as Clara/Ann Bower
- Lemmy Carson as Pico
- Gianni Milito as Pico
- Ivan Scratuglia as Jeb
- Remo Capitani as the Sheriff

== Production ==
The film had the working title Appuntamento di fuoco ('Fire date').

== Reception ==
Rewieving the film, Italian critic Davide Pulici noted the striking non-conformist approach of the film, where "strangeness and dissimilarity [from the genre] are meticulously planned", with a significant amount of screen time devoted to sadism (particularly in a long sequence featuring 61 whip strokes on Chaliko, described by Pulici as "one of the genre's most extreme instances of sadistic representation") and homosexuality (subtly suggested in the dynamic between the Ireland and Lemmon characters, and explicit in the Scratuglia's portrayal of Jeb). French critic Jean-Marie Sabatier, while describing the film as "mediocre", apprecciated "the astonishing psychological climate in which it immerses a very banal intrigue". Italian film historian Matteo Mancini panned the film, which has "no noteworthy moments", and with Colucci that "brings nothing new to the genre, directs in a tired manner, and tends to stretch out sequences".
