= 2019, After the Fall of New York =

1983 film directed by Sergio Martino

- Theatrical release poster by Renato Casaro
- Directed by: Sergio Martino (Note: Credited as 'Martin Dolman'.)
- Written by: Ernesto Gastaldi; Sergio Martino; Gabriel Rossini
- Produced by: Luciano Martino
- Starring: Michael Sopkiw; Valentine Monnier; Anna Kanakis; George Eastman
- Cinematography: Giancarlo Ferrando
- Edited by: Eugenio Alabiso
- Music by: Guido De Angelis; Maurizio De Angelis
- Production company: Nuova Dania Cinematografica; Medusa Film; Les Films du Griffon
- Distributed by: Medusa Film (Italy)
- Release dates: July 22, 1983 (Italy); January 11, 1984 (France)
- Running time: 91 minutes
- Countries: Italy; France

2019, After the Fall of New York (Italian: 2019 - Dopo la caduta di New York, also known simply as After the Fall of New York) is a 1983 post-apocalyptic action film co-written and directed by Sergio Martino and starring Michael Sopkiw, Valentine Monnier, Anna Kanakis, George Eastman and Edmund Purdom. Set after a nuclear apocalypse, the film follows a mercenary (Sopkiw) out to rescue the last fertile woman on Earth. An Italian-French co-production, it was released in Italy by Medusa Film on July 22, 1983.

== Plot ==
In 1999, World War III between the Pan-American Confederacy and the Eurac Monarchy (comprising Europe, Africa, and Asia) resulted in a nuclear holocaust. 20 years later, radiation has rendered all remaining humans sterile, and the victorious Euracs have occupied Manhattan and hunt survivors for genetic experiments.

After winning a motorized deathmatch in Nevada, an ex-Confederate soldier named Parsifal is abducted and taken to the Confederacy's secret base in Alaska. The President of the Confederacy tells him there is a fertile woman somewhere in New York City. He offers Parsifal a place on a Confederate rocketship bound for Alpha Centauri if he can infiltrate the city and retrieve her; otherwise, he will be killed. When Parsifal proposes sending in a cyborg instead, the President reveals the Confederacy eliminated all its cyborgs.

Parsifal is accompanied by two Confederate agents, Bronx and Ratchet. After entering Manhattan through the sewers, they are attacked by the Harlem Hunters, a street gang. They escape and come upon the Needle People, a group of scavengers led by the Rat Eater King, preparing to kill a dwarf named Shorty. Parsifal intervenes, and the three agents are captured. Eurac troops raid the scavengers’ hideout and bring Parsifal, Bronx, and Ratchet to their base along with a scavenger girl, Giara.

Parsifal escapes and rescues Bronx and Giara. Bronx stays behind and is killed, while Parsifal and Giara are saved by Ratchet. The three escape into the sewers and find refuge in a subterranean dwarf colony with Shorty, who claims to know the location of the fertile woman. The colony is attacked by Euracs using sonic weapons, and Parsifal, Giara, Ratchet, and Shorty flee. They are saved by a group of ape-like mutants, led by Big Ape. When Parsifal explains their mission, Big Ape reveals he is also fertile. That night, Parsifal protects Giara from one of Big Ape's mutants, and they have sex.

Shorty leads them to an underground vault, where they find a deceased professor and a life support chamber containing Melissa, the professor's daughter, who entered hibernation before the bombs fell and thus remained fertile. They also find a station wagon to escape through the Lincoln Tunnel. Big Ape and Giara stay with Melissa while Shorty, Parsifal, and Ratchet leave to find armor plating for the car. Big Ape then knocks Giara unconscious and impregnates Melissa.

At a junkyard, Shorty distracts the Euracs and sacrifices himself to buy Parsifal and Ratchet time to salvage. They return, collect Melissa, and drive through a cave wall into the tunnel. Parsifal manages to navigate the armored car past several minefields and barricades to freedom, but Big Ape is killed by a laser trap. While driving through the desert to their rendezvous, Parsifal deduces that Ratchet is actually a cyborg. Ratchet attacks him and stabs Giara before Parsifal kills him. Giara begs Parsifal to ensure humanity's survival as she dies in his arms.

Back at the Confederacy's headquarters, the President reveals that he is terminally ill, and gives Parsifal his place on the rocketship, which is revealed to be the base itself. As the ship blasts off, Parsifal watches Melissa finally awaken.

== Cast ==
- Michael Sopkiw as Parsifal
- Valentine Monnier as Giara
- Anna Kanakis as Ania
- George Eastman as Big Ape
- Romano Puppo as Ratchet
- Paolo Maria Scalondro as Bronx
- Luigi D'Ecclesia as Shorty
- Edmund Purdom as the President of the Confederacy
- Serge Feuillard as the Eurac Commander
- Haruhiko Yamanouchi as the Rat Eater King
- Jacques Stany as Eurac Officer
- Tony Askin as Aschi
- Alessandra Tani as Flower
- James E.R. Sampson as Trumpeter

== Production ==
The film belongs to the post-apocalyptic Italian genre similar to the films 1990 The Bronx Warriors and Endgame, and was heavily influenced by John Carpenter's Escape from New York and George Miller's Mad Max 2. The story's premise also bears some similarities with Alfonso Cuarón's 2006 film Children of Men. Besides the idea of the lack of fertile women in Earth, both films include a scene with Picasso's Guernica used as a backdrop.

A co-production between Italian and French studios, 2019 was shot principally at De Paolis Studios in Rome, with some exterior location filming in Arizona (for the desert sequences) and New York City.

The film's director Sergio Martino and screenwriter Ernesto Gastaldi are both credited under Americanized pseudonyms ("Martin Dolman" and "Julian Barry", respectively).

== Release ==
2019, After the Fall of New York was distributed in the United States in January 1985 with a 95-minute running time. Released for home viewing on DVD, VHS and Blu-Ray

== Reception ==
Creature Feature gave the movie 2 out of 5 stars. While it found the rubble and sewers to be well done, it states the acting and direction to be lacking. Moria found the movie to be better than other Italian exploitation films, and better than most other Mad Max rip-offs, giving the movie 2 stars. TV Guide gave the movie one out of 5 stars, finding it to be "silly at best, with ludicrous plot full of clichés and holes, bad acting, and laughable special effects."
