= Cross of the Seven Jewels =

- Directed by: Marco Antonio Andolfi
- Screenplay by: Marco Antonio Andolfi
- Story by: Marco Antonio Andolfi
- Starring: Marco Antonio Andolfi; Annie Belle; Gordon Mitchell
- Cinematography: Carlo Poletti
- Edited by: Marco Antonio Andolfi
- Music by: Paolo Rustichelli
- Production company: Compagnia di Prosa "Roma"
- Distributed by: Compagnia Distribuzione Internazionale
- Release date: 30 April 1987 (Italy)
- Running time: 83 minutes
- Country: Italy

Cross of the Seven Jewels (Italian: La croce dalle 7 pietre) is a 1987 Italian horror film directed, written and starring Marco Antonio Andolfi. Prior to directing the film, Andolfi worked in film in the amateur theatre and claims to have worked in developing stories for Lanciostory. He based the film on his work in theatre and comics and real life experiences. Among the cast includes Andolfi who is credited as Eddy Endolf and Annie Belle and adult film actress Zaira Zoccheddu.

After the film's release, Andolfi re-edited the film in 1995 and re-released it under the name Talisman. This version of the film included footage from documentaries and newsreels and footage from The Serpent and the Rainbow.

== Plot ==
The film begins with a sadomasochistic satanic sect led by a priest who evokes the demon Aborym with a magic ritual. A few years later, Marco Sartori, a Roman bank employee, goes to Naples to find his cousin Carmela, whom he hasn't seen for several years: having met her at the train station, after a chat at a bar, they walk through the streets of the Neapolitan city, when four muggers steal a precious jeweled cross from Marco that he wears around his neck. With the help of the police, Marco tries to unmask the thieves, but they have already sold the precious cross. The following day, Marco discovers that the girl who waited for him at the station is not actually his cousin, but a friend of hers, Elena, who had probably fallen in love with him. Marco, meanwhile, decides to continue his search for the cross. After meeting a girl named Maria in a disco, Marco goes to a Camorra boss. The latter, aware of his job, makes him an offer in exchange for information: that is, to return a list of bank accounts in exchange for the cross, but Marco refuses and is beaten by the boss's henchmen. The next evening, after being rescued and hosted at Maria's house, he goes to a fence named Totonno 'o Cafone in the hope of finding the cross. Desperate, he discovers that it has already been sold by a certain Don Raffaele Esposito, a powerful Camorra boss from Somma Vesuviana. At midnight precisely, Marco transforms into a werewolf and kills the fence. Thus, it is discovered, through nightmares, that Marco was born from a relationship between his mother and the demon Aborym and that he is destined to transform into a werewolf forever every night, unless he wears the jeweled cross. Returned to normal, Marco continues his search for the cross and reaches Don Raffaele Esposito: believing him to be a policeman, Don Esposito imprisons Marco, who, after midnight, manages to free himself by transforming into a werewolf and massacring the Camorristi. After discovering that the cross is in the hands of a Roman fortune teller named Armisia, Marco returns to Rome to recover it: when he reaches the woman's house, he transforms into a werewolf again and kills her during sexual intercourse. Thanks to Maria's intervention, the cross is recovered and Marco regains his human appearance. Just when Marco regains possession of the cross, the priest at the beginning of the film who had evoked Aborym dies in a car accident. The film ends with Marco and Maria happily walking in St. Peter's Square and with an apparition of Jesus Christ in transparency to symbolize the protagonist's newfound serenity.

== Production ==
Marco Antonio Andolfi worked first at a sewing machine company as a technician while working in amateur theatre on the side. While attempting to work in film in the 1970s, he stated he worked writing plays and photonovels for Lanciostory magazine. The story and screenplay for the film were based on a real-life event that happened to Andolfi who stated that in Naples he had a bejeweled cross he was going to give to a woman in Naples, when two people in motorcycles came by and took it off his neck. Andolfi stated he retrieved the cross and combined this real-life story with stories from his plays and comics.

Andolf managed to get funding from the state due to Article 28 of the 1965 cinema law that allowed for state funding for films with cultural or artistic aspirations. Andolfi stars in the film under the name of Eddy Endolf, stating that this was done as "distributors would not even take me into consideration". Among the cast were pornographic film actor Zaira Zoccheddu and actress Annie Belle. Belle was suffering from alcohol abuse at the time and stated in a later interview that she did not remember anything about the film.

== Release ==
Cross of the Seven Jewels was distributed theatrically in Italy on 30 April 1987 by Compagnia Distribuzione Internazionale. Andolfi assembled a re-edited version of the film in 1995 titled Talisman, with scenes taken from documentaries, newsreel footage and from the film The Serpent and the Rainbow.

== Reception ==
Italian film critic and historian Roberto Curti described the film as having a reputation of being "one of the worst Italian movies ever made".
