= Monster Shark =

- Italian theatrical release poster by Enzo Sciotti
- Directed by: Lamberto Bava
- Screenplay by: Gianfranco Clerici; Vincenzo Mannino; Dardano Sacchetti; Hervé Piccini
- Story by: Luigi Cozzi; Luciano Martino; Sergio Martino
- Produced by: Mino Loy
- Starring: Michael Sopkiw; Gianni Garko; William Berger
- Cinematography: Giancarlo Ferrando
- Edited by: Roberto Sterbini
- Music by: Fabio Frizzi
- Production companies: National Cinematografica; Nuova Dania Cinematografica; Filmes International; National Cinematografica; Les Films Du Griffon
- Distributed by: DLF Distribution Lanciamento Film
- Release dates: September 7, 1984 (Turin); January 23, 1985 (France)
- Running time: 95 minutes
- Countries: Italy; France

Monster Shark (Italian: Shark - Rosso nell'oceano) is a 1984 science fiction-horror film directed by Lamberto Bava. The film is set at a tourist location along the Florida coastline. The shore is plagued by a mysterious marine creature who is secretly the product of a military experiment—a hybrid of a common octopus and the prehistoric Dunkleosteus. Military scientists race civilian scientists to prevent the secret of their murderous monster's escape from getting out.

== Plot ==
A yacht is found capsized, as well as a body nearby with three appendages bitten off.

Dr. Stella Dickens's dolphins swim around fast, even after she tells them not to. She asks them what's wrong, but they capsize her rowboat. Simultaneously, Dr. Bob Hogan's research boat, the Seaquarium, shakes so much that his beer tips over. Later that day, they discuss the mystery, but to no effect.

Electricians Sandra Hayes and Peter argue over whether a screen can be fixed before he leaves for vacation in New York. Stella stops him, with an order for equipment requiring a day's work. That he acquiesces so readily adds to Sandra's jealousy.

Neglected wife and West Ocean International (WOI) scientist Sonja West makes a pass at WOI Dept. Director Davis Barker. WOI worker Florinda warns her boss that she's going to spill a secret to The Washington Post. Henchman Miller shows up minutes before her cab to the airport arrives, and strangles her. He then stages a suicide in a bathtub.

While Peter and Sandra make love, Miller breaks into their shop downstairs with two other henchman, breaks the converter for Stella, beats up Peter, and escapes unrecognized.

As the police figure out from her calling for a taxi that Florinda was murdered, it is revealed that Dr. West ordered the hit. Meanwhile, an unusual fish scares off a tiger shark and attacks two men in a small motorboat, killing one and injuring the other.

The next day Peter has fixed the day's worth of work destroyed by Miller and installs it on the Seaquarium. Peter and Bob argue a bit. The screen Peter installed locates a large fish. Meanwhile, hitman Miller receives a payment from Davis.

A large fish comes within a few feet of the boat. Bob finally is able to record the sound with Peter's new equipment. Back in the hospital, the victim who could have described the shark passes away after attempts to revive him with adrenaline and a defibrillator. Sheriff Gordon insists the patient died of fright.

Bob asks West's lab for help analyzing the audio. West slyly insists the uncopied tape remain with him, while playing up the proto-fish angle. Bob calls in an outside expert on proto-sharks, Dr. Janet Bates.

In their yacht, Karl and Molly are attacked by tentacles, killing them. The civilian scientists continue to believe they're hunting a living fossil rather than an artificial hybrid, just as West would prefer.

Miller teases Sandra at the pool, revealing they have a past, that she gave Miller the keys to the shop, and that she tipped him off what equipment to destroy, explaining her holding Peter back from investigating the break-in and neither coming downstairs to help nor calling the police. She tells Miller she wants out, just as Florinda told West. Officer Fernando Cortes later reports to the sheriff she was murdered in Harrison Bay.

Bob finds his sensors sabotaged, but the only boat around was West's yacht. While Peter and Stella meet on a beach, back on the Seaquarium Janet and Bob learn the shark has tentacles. Janet survives an ensuing attack that kills Bob. The secret of the hybrid creation now out, the Seaquarium is again attacked, but this time by hitman Miller and his henchmen. Miller assassinates Janet. The fish, attracted by the mating call Peter rigged up, kills Miller and another henchmen.

West researches the fish. He learns from recovered tentacle that the monster fish can reproduce asexually, so the sheriff blows all the explosives he had laid out, to prevent little pieces of fish from becoming numerous monster fish. Davis pulls a gun on West; they wear the same watch because they share the same woman.

Following Peter's electronic mating call, the monster fish moves from the saltwater of the ocean to the freshwater Everglades, shallow enough to corner it into a fiery end, but not before the fish attacks Peter's outboard, warranting his jumping into the water to escape.

== Cast ==
- Michael Sopkiw as Peter
- Valentine Monnier as Dr. Stella Dickens
- Gianni Garko as Sheriff Gordon
- William Berger as Professor Donald West
- Iris Peynado as Sandra Hayes
- Dino Conti as Dr. Bob Hogan
- Cinzia de Ponti as Florinda
- Paul Branco as Dr. Davis Barker
- Dagmar Lassander as Sonja West
- Darla N. Warner as Dr. Janet Bates

== Production ==
The film was an Italian and French co-production. It was made by the French film companies Filmes International and Les Filmes du Griffon and the Italian companies National Cinematografica and Nuova Dania Cinematographica.

Director Lamberto Bava was credited under the pseudonym of John Old, Jr. for both Monster Shark and Blastfighter (1984). Bava explained that he did this as he did not want his name associated with the respective genres of both films.

== Release and reception ==
Monster Shark was released in Turin, Italy on September 7, 1984. Bava said the Italian title was supposed to be simply Rosso nell'oceano (lit. 'Red in the Ocean'), but was changed to add the word Shark to it. Bava disliked this addition saying it "made no sense because there isn't a fucking shark in the film."

This was followed by a screening in France on January 23, 1985. It has been released on Blu-ray as both Monster Shark and Devil Fish.

TV Guide called it "wholly amateurish" and criticized the film's unconvincing monster. In his book The Gorehound's Guide to Splatter Films (2003), author Scott Aaron Stine described it as being full of "tired shocks" and was ultimately an "uninspired monster movie."

Star Michael Sopkiw attributes the film's flaws and negative reviews to the production's limited budget, saying that Lamberto Bava was a great director.

== Mystery Science Theater 3000 ==
Under its alternative title of Devil Fish, the film was featured on episode #911 of the movie-mocking television series Mystery Science Theater 3000 (MST3K), airing on the Sci-Fi Channel on August 15, 1998. One scene of this film contains a brief glimpse of a male character's genitals, the show censored by superimposing the MST3K logo. Writer/performer Kevin Murphy wrote that the European cast, the Florida setting, and small bathing suits "gives us license to Euro-bash until the sun goes down." He also mocks the Coast Guard for being involved in the production.

Paste writer Jim Vorel placed the episode at #147 (Note: Ranking based on 197 episodes as of 2018.) in his ranking of episodes from MST3K's first twelve seasons. Vorel calls the movie a "comprehensive course on bad film editing," probably the most humorously bad editing of any MST3K movie. "It’s legitimately the highlight of a film that is otherwise a real slog," Vorel writes. The editing and visuals combine into a whole "so atrocious that it’s often difficult to tell what is happening during any sequence where the monster is on screen."

The MST3K version of the film was included as part of the Mystery Science Theater 3000, Volume XIX DVD collection, released by Shout! Factory on November 9, 2010. Special features with the film include the movie's theatrical trailer. The other episodes in the four-disc set include Robot Monster (#107), Bride of the Monster (#423), and Devil Doll (#818).

== See also ==
- Sharktopus
