= Fabio Frizzi =

Italian musician and composer

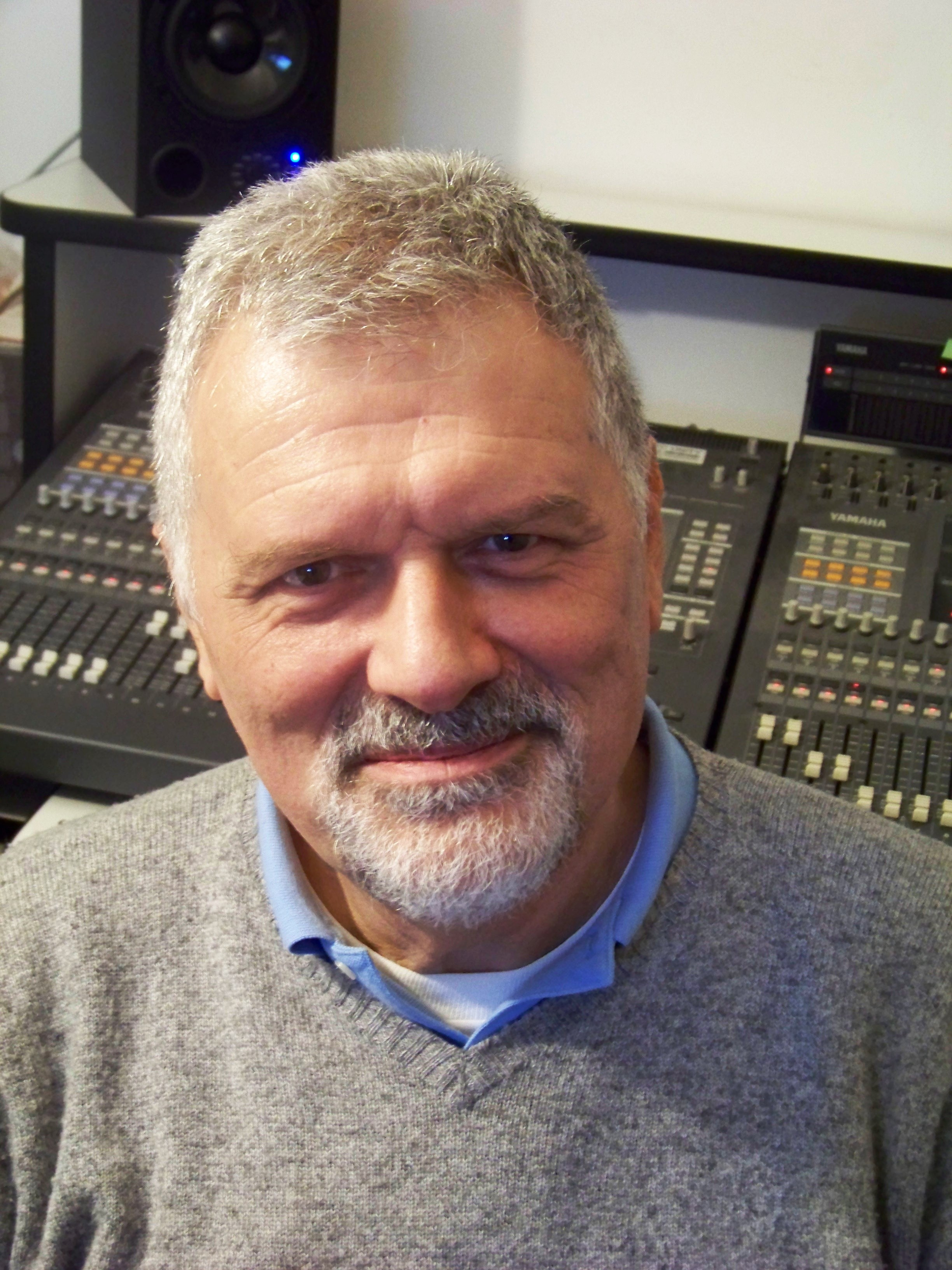
- Frizzi in 2011

Background information
- Born: 2 July 1951 (age 75); Bologna, Emilia-Romagna, Italy
- Genres: Film score; electronic; classical; rock
- Occupation: Film composer

Fabio Frizzi (born 2 July 1951) is an Italian musician and composer. Born in Bologna, Emilia-Romagna, Italy, he is best known for his scores for horror films.

== Career ==
Prior to his work in film, he was a member of several classical music groups and a pop rock band.

Working on his own and as a member of a trio with Franco Bixio and Vincenzo Tempera, Frizzi was most active in Spaghetti Western, exploitation and horror films, though he also scored action and comedy films, as well as an erotic film. He was a frequent collaborator with horror film director Lucio Fulci.

Fabio is the older brother of the late television presenter Fabrizio Frizzi.

== Influences and style ==
Fabio Frizzi's scores draw from electronic, classical and rock music. He often uses the mellotron and Moog synthesizer in his compositions, owing to his love of progressive rock.

== Selected filmography ==
Solo

Year	Film	Directed by	Singles / Main Tracks	Latest CD / Digital Release
1974	Amore libero - Free Love	Pier Ludovico Pavoni	Cinevox MDF 055: Ibu Ile / Coconut	Quartet Records / QRSCE012 / 2010
1978	Manaos	Alberto Vázquez-Figueroa		Beat Records / DDJ023 / 2012
1979	7 Dangerous Women	Pedro Lazaga		
1979	Cindy's Love Games	Aldo Grimaldi		
1979	Zombi 2	Lucio Fulci		Beat Records / CDX1035 / 2021
1980	Contraband	Lucio Fulci	Cinevox MDF 133: You Are Not The Same / The Smuggler	Beat Records / DDJ038 / 2015
1980	City of the Living Dead	Lucio Fulci		Beat Records / BCM9549 / 2014
1981	The Beyond	Lucio Fulci		Beat Records / CDCR 114 / 2011
1982	Vieni avanti cretino	Luciano Salce		Beat Records / DDJ03DLX / 2015
1982	Manhattan Baby	Lucio Fulci		Beat Records / CDCR 112 / 2011
1982	Scorpion with Two Tails	Sergio Martino		Cometa Edizioni Musicali / CMT 10022 / 2011
1982	La gorilla	Romolo Guerrieri		
1984	Crime in Formula One	Bruno Corbucci		Beat Records / DDJ26DLX / 2022
1984	The Last Mercenary	Mario Siciliano		CAM Digital / 2025
1984	Blastfighter	Lamberto Bava		Beat Records / DDJ055 / 2023
1984	Cop in Drag	Bruno Corbucci		Beat Records / DDJ11DLX / 2016
1984	Devil Fish	Lamberto Bava		Beat Records / DDJ044 / 2016
1986	Stripped To Die	Gabriele Lavia	Mercury / 888256: We'll Die Together (3:35) / Sensi (2:48)	
1986	Aladdin	Bruno Corbucci		Digitmovies / CDDM118 / 2008
1990	Cat in the Brain	Lucio Fulci		Beat Records / CDCR 135 / 2017
1999	Fantozzi 2000 – La clonazione	Domenico Saverni		
2002	Febbre da cavallo - La mandrakata	Carlo Vanzina		
2012	House of Forbidden Secrets	Todd Sheets		
2013	The Cold Eyes of Death	Chris Milewski		
2014	Violets Bloom at an Empty Grave	Chris Milewski		
2018	Puppet Master: The Littlest Reich	Sonny Laguna, Tommy Wiklund		

Finnish singer Taiska used the melody of Frizzi's composition "Ibo lele" for her song, "Mombasa".

With Bixio - Frizzi - Tempera

Year	Film	Directed by	Singles / Main Tracks	Latest CD / Digital Release
1975	Carambola's Philosophy: In the Right Pocket	Ferdinando Baldi	Cinevox MDF 071: Sky's Motor Bike (3:07) / Coby And Len (3:39)	Digitmovies / CDDM054 / 2006
1975	Fantozzi	Luciano Salce	Regal 3C 006-18082: La Ballata Di Fantozzi (3:30) / L'Impiegatango (3:05)	Beat Records / DDJ01-1DLX / 2012
1975	The Sinner (1975)	Pier Ludovico Pavoni		
1975	Dracula in the Provinces	Lucio Fulci		
1975	Four of the Apocalypse	Lucio Fulci	Cinevox MDF 080: Movin' On (3:39) / Let Us Pray (2:56) + Cinevox MDF 089: Death's Song (2:58)	Cinevox / CD MDF 316 / 1998
1975	Go Gorilla Go	Tonino Valerii	Cinevox MDF 085: Vai Gorilla (2:55) / Selvaggia (3:25)	Chris' Soundtrack Corner / CSC 007 / 2010
1975	Get Mean	Ferdinando Baldi		
1976	The Loves and Times of Scaramouche	Enzo G. Castellari	Cinevox MDF 088: Scaramouche (3:20) / Ouverture 1812, Op. 49 (3:12)	
1976	Geometra Prinetti selvaggiamente Osvaldo	Ferdinando Baldi	Cinevox MDF 094: Savanah's Theme (2:59) / Saudade (3:56)	Beat Records / DDJ039 / 2015
1976	Blue Belle	Massimo Dallamano		
1976	Il secondo tragico Fantozzi	Luciano Salce		Beat Records / DDJ01-1DLX / 2012
1976	Rome: The Other Side of Violence	Marino Girolami		Digitmovies / CDDM180 / 2011
1976	Febbre da cavallo	Steno	Cinevox MDF 101: Febbre Da Cavallo / Tris	Beat Records / CDF 090 / 2017
1976	Tutti Possono Arricchire Tranne I Poveri	Mauro Severino	Cinevox MDF 102: 850 Milioni / Euforia	Beat Records / DDJ048 / 2019
1976	Born Winner	Aldo Lado	Cinevox MDF 103: L'Ultima Volta (2:19) / Avanagiu (2:04)	
1977	Sette note in nero aka The Psychic	Lucio Fulci	Cinevox MDF 112: 7 Note / Tracce Sul Muro	Digibeat / DGBT002 / 2015
1978	Nest of Vipers	Tonino Cervi	Cinevox MDF 117: Ritratto Di Borghesia In Nero / Immagini Sfocate	Digitmovies / CDDM206 / 2012
1978	Silver Saddle	Lucio Fulci	Cinevox MDF 119: Silver Saddle (3:13) Two Hearts (4:39)	Digitmovies / CDDM023 / 2004
1978	Where Are You Going on Holiday? "Si, Buana" episode	Luciano Salce		GDM / CD CLUB 7079 / 2010
