= Taiska =

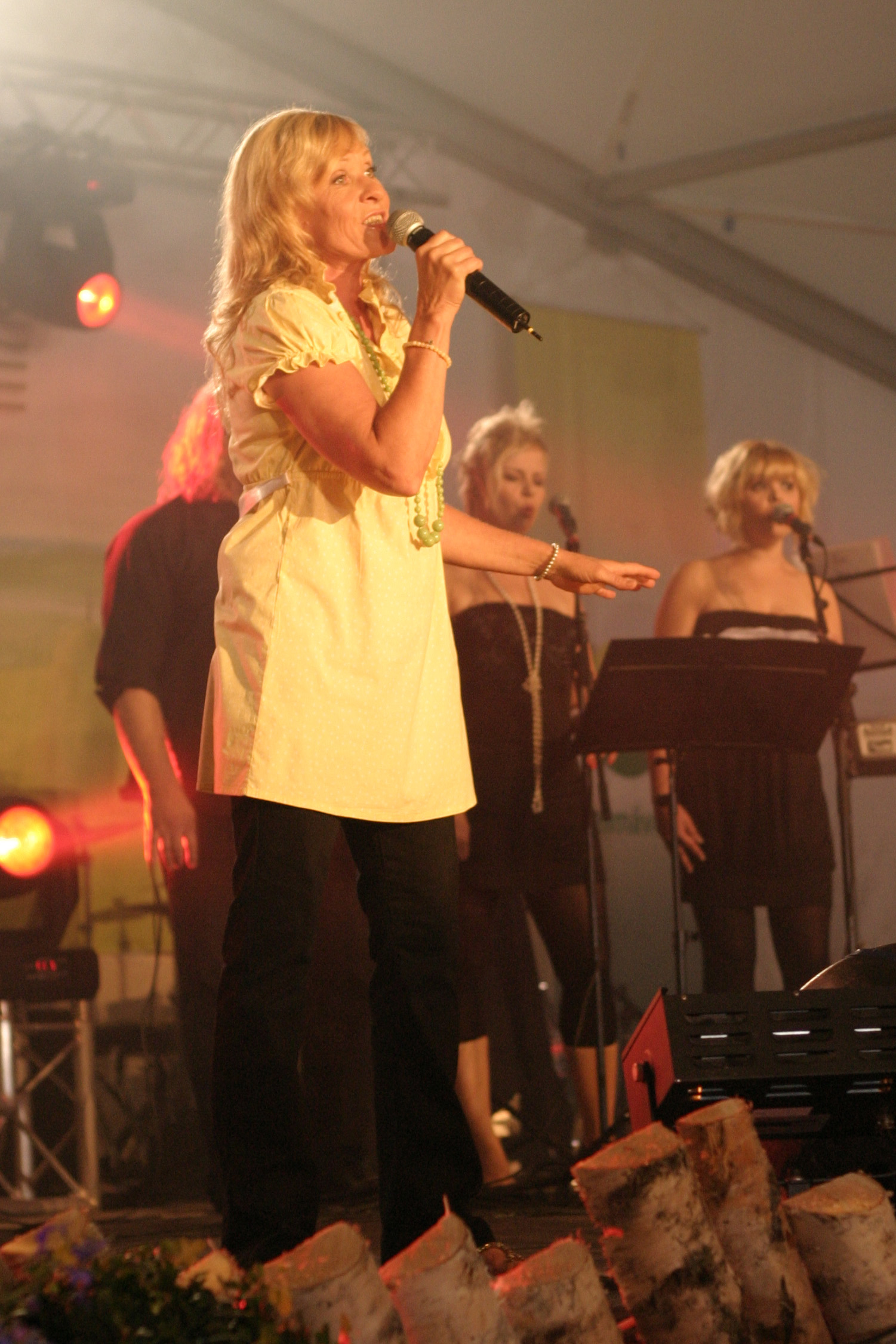
- Born: 9 June 1955 (age 70); Imatra
- Issue: Elias Kauppinen

Taiska or Hannele Aulikki Kauppinen, née Suominen (born 9 June 1955 in Imatra) is a Finnish singer of popular music. She is mostly known for her evergreen hit, "Mombasa" (1975), originally by Italian composer Fabio Frizzi. She married Pekka Kauppinen in 1984, bore him a son named Elias, and divorced in 1990.

== World Popular Song Festival ==
In the World Popular Song Festival 1977, in Tokyo, Japan, she represented Finland with a Finnish-language song ("Boogie-mies"), with a score of 56 points.

== Discography ==
=== Albums ===
- Mombasa (1976)
- Taiska (1978)
- Villi vapaudenkaipuu (1980)
- Oma tie (1981)
- 20 suosikkia – Mombasa (1996)
- 20 suosikkia – Rannalla (2000)
- Matkalla (2005)
- Taiska – Hitit (2011)
