= Django Shoots First =

1966 film

- Directed by: Alberto De Martino
- Screenplay by: Tito Carpi; Alessandro Continenza; Massimiliano Capriccioli; Vincenzo Flamini; Giovanni Simonelli
- Story by: Tito Carpi; Alessandro Continenza; Massimiliano Capriccioli; Vincenzo Flamini; Giovanni Simonelli
- Produced by: Edmondo Amati
- Starring: Glenn Saxson; Ida Galli; Nando Gazzolo; Alberto Lupo
- Cinematography: Riccardo Pallottini
- Edited by: Otello Colangeli
- Music by: Bruno Nicolai
- Production company: Fida Cinematografica
- Distributed by: Fida Cinematografica
- Release date: 1966
- Running time: 95 minutes
- Country: Italy

Django Shoots First (Italian: Django spara per primo) is an Italian Spaghetti Western film directed by Alberto De Martino.

== Plot ==
Ringo, a bounty hunter, has killed the father of Glenn Garvin (Glenn Saxson) to collect a bounty. Glenn kills Ringo and then takes his father's body to town to collect the bounty himself. There he befriends Gordon (Fernando Sancho in city clothes and a bowler hat instead of his usual Mexican bandit outfit), who tells Glenn that he stands to inherit half of everything in town, which his father had owned in partnership with Ken Cluster.

Cluster's henchman Ward and his men try and fail to kill Glenn, so Cluster robs his own bank and frames Glenn for murder. Glenn escapes and is taken in by Cluster's wife, Jessica, who wants Glenn to kill her husband. However, it turns out that Jessica is also married to a stranger, Doc (Alberto Lupo), who had helped Glenn earlier. Jessica escapes to Ward, whom she convinces that Cluster wants him to stash the bank robbery loot in Mexico, in her name. Glenn, Doc, and Gordon ambush the convoy and kill Ward, while Jessica is arrested for the robbery, on the testimony of Cluster.

Cluster and Glenn sign an agreement and there is a celebration. Doc leaves and liberates Jessica. She takes his gun and leaves with the money, despite Doc's warning that Cluster will kill her outside. The gun turns out to be unloaded, and Cluster fatally stabs her.

Gordon and Glenn start a saloon brawl and sneak out unnoticed. At the cemetery, Glenn and Doc find Cluster. Glenn – who earlier, even before the partnership, learned that his father was framed and that Ringo was tracking him at Cluster's request – is offered part of the loot but chooses to avenge his father instead. He shoots Cluster's gun out of his hand and kills him when he draws a knife. He buries the corpse in the grave of Glenn's father. Glenn makes apologies to his father and posts a reward for Cluster, just as the latter had done for his father.

Doc, Gordon, and Glenn leave, but the latter two decide to return when they discover that the gold in the saddlebag has been replaced with a note from the saloon girl Lucy, who Glenn had been reluctant to leave behind anyway.

In the final scene we see Glenn, Gordon, and Lucy running the bank when Cluster's son appears to claim his half of the gold.

== Cast ==
- Glenn Saxson as Glenn Garvin / Django
- Fernando Sancho as Gordon
- Evelyn Stewart as Jessica Cluster
- Nando Gazzolo as Ken Cluster
- Erika Blanc as Lucy
- Alberto Lupo as Doc
- José Manuel Martín as Ringo (credited as José M. Martín)
- Guido Lollobrigida as Ward (credited as Lee Burton)
- George Eastman as Jeff Cluster

== Release ==
Django Shoots First was released in 1966.

== Reception ==
From a contemporary reviews, John Raisbeck reviewed a 95-minute dubbed language version of the film in the Monthly Film Bulletin. Raisbeck found the film to be a "lifeless Italian Western" which "plods wearily through the required rituals, drawing ineffectually on the work of Leone: the black-caped stranger, Doc, is clearly a first cousin to the van Cleef character in the Dollar films, and the final shoot-out takes place, conveniently and derivatively, in a cemetery."

In his investigation of narrative structures in Spaghetti Western films, Bert Fridlund argues that Django Shoots First presents a complicated rendition of the partnership plot that was used in many Spaghetti Westerns following the success of For a Few Dollars More, where one of the bounty killer partners turns out to have a secret vengeance motive. Glenn is the protagonist who has a double motive. During the major part of the narrative, his inheritance is his primary concern, but eventually he manages to get his vengeance as well. Doc is the partner with a hidden motive – not concerning the malefactor Cluster, but getting back or punishing his bigamist wife. Their opposition, the Clusters, betray each other for money. Finally, Lucy betrays Glenn, stealing his money to secure his love.

"Glenn Saxon [sic], in his performance as Glenn recalls the ironic touch and blond gusto of vindicative hero archetype Giuliano Gemma. Most of the many lead actors rather emulating the Clint Eastwood style and demeanor would have had a hard time carrying the scene where Glenn, after a stunt in bed with Jessica, appears in a female dressing gown and gun belt!"
