= Valentine Monnier =

French actress and model (born 1956)

Valentine Monnier (born 22 October 1956 in Paris) is a French actress, model and photographer. She appeared on the September 1977 cover of Cosmopolitan magazine, and on the cover art of the album Chic, also in 1977. Monnier had an acting career in the 1980s: she played supporting roles in several French productions and had starring roles in two Italian B-movies. In the mid-1980s, she left acting to work primarily as a photographer. In a November 2019 interview, she alleged film director Roman Polanski raped her in Switzerland in 1975 when she was 18.

== Filmography ==
- 1980 : Le Bar du téléphone : Maria
- 1981 : Le Mari, la Femme et le Cosmos (TV movie) : Paule
- 1981 : L'Œil de la nuit (TV series), episode : Le syndrome de Cendrillon : Sybille
- 1982 : Les Enquêtes du commissaire Maigret de Jean-Paul Sassy (TV series), episode : Le Voleur de Maigret : Sophie
- 1982 : Elle voit des nains partout ! : Amélys
- 1983 : 2019, After the Fall of New York (2019 - Dopo la caduta di New York) : Giara
- 1984 : Monster Shark (Shark rosso nell'oceano) : Dr. Stella Dickens
- 1985 : Le Soleil des autres (TV movie) : Terry
- 1985 : Trois hommes et un couffin (remade in the US as Three Men and a Baby): Charlotte
- 1985 : L'Homme aux yeux d'argent : wounded woman
