= The Magnificent Texan =

1968 film

- Directed by: Luigi Capuano
- Written by: Luigi Capuano; Arpad De Riso; Manuel Martinez Remis
- Starring: Glenn Saxson; Massimo Serato
- Cinematography: Pablo Ripoll
- Edited by: Antonio Gimeno
- Music by: Francesco De Masi
- Release date: 1967
- Countries: Italy; Spain

The Magnificent Texan (Italian: Il magnifico texano, Spanish: Diez horcas para un pistolero) is a 1967 Spaghetti Western film co-written and directed by Luigi Capuano under the pseudonym Lewis King.

== Cast ==
- Glenn Saxson as Manuel Lopez
- Massimo Serato as Blackie Stark
- Barbara Loy as Evelyn Wilkins
- Beny Deus as Judge Wilkins
- Anna Miserocchi as Corina Wilkins
- Gloria Osuna as Carmen
- Fulvia Franco as Molly
- Giorgio Cerioni as William
- Glauco Onorato as José Pereira
- Nerio Bernardi as Cico
- Luis Induni as the Sheriff
- Ignazio Balsamo as Santiago
- Riccardo Pizzuti as Jimmy Stark
- Mimmo Poli as Barman

== Production ==
The film is an Italian-Spanish co-production by Selenia and RM Film. It was entirely shot in Italy, between De Paolis Studios in Rome, Anzio, Mazzano Romano and Villa Mussolini in Riccione. Oberdan Trojani served as cinematographer, though in the official credits he was replaced by Spanish cinematographer Pablo Ripoll, a choice made to obtain funding from the Spanish government.

== Reception ==
In a contemporary review, Corriere della Sera described the film as 'violent and mediocre'. Italian critic Marco Giusti particularly criticized Glenn Saxson's performance ('expressionless') and costumes ('terrible, [...] a mish-mash of Zorro and Clint Eastwood').
