= Antonio Dimitri =

Italian actor and singer (1931–2019)

Antonio Costanzo Dimitri
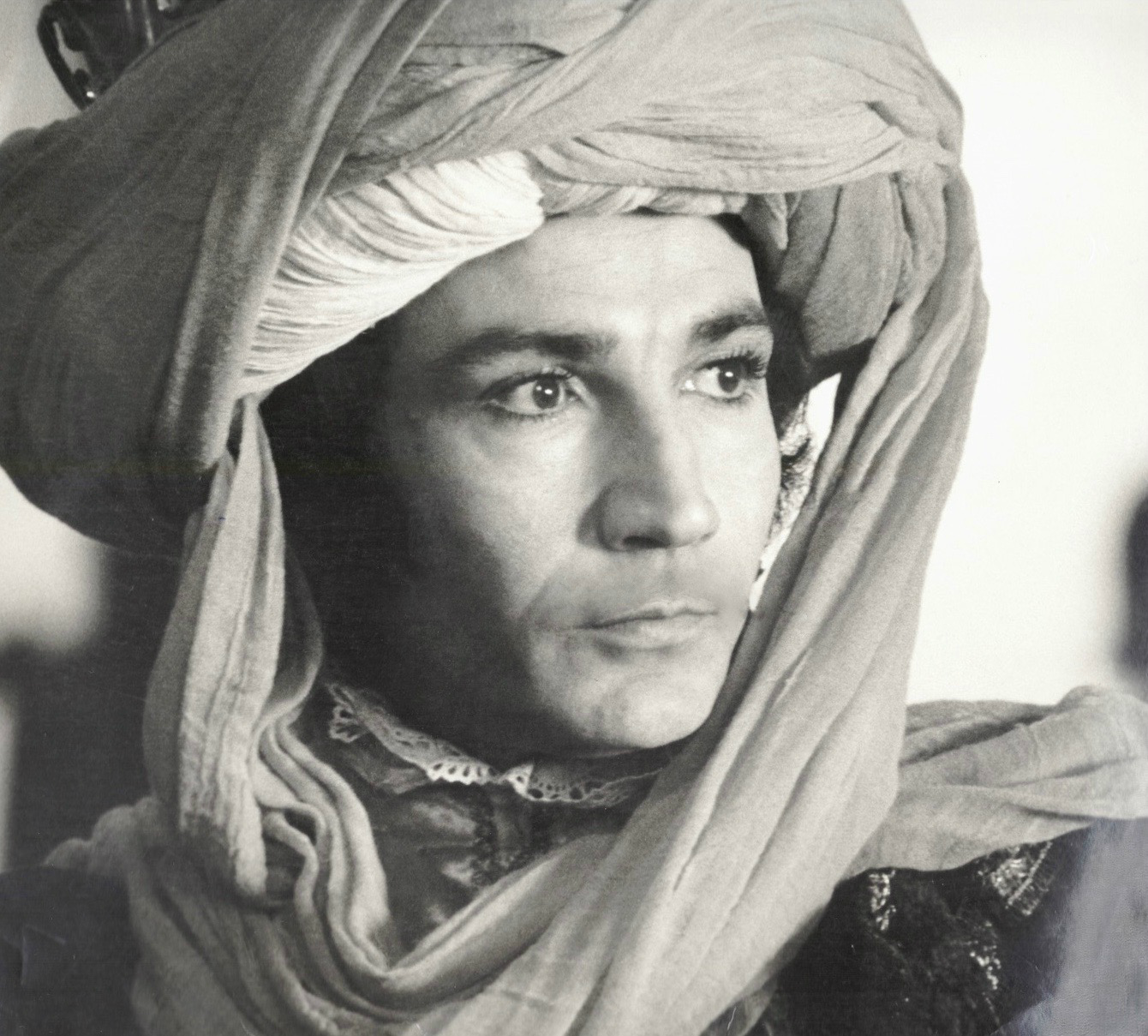
- Tony Dimitri in Orlando Furioso

Background information
- Genres: Folk
- Instrument: Singer
- Years active: 1965–1977
- Label: CGD

Antonio Costanzo Dimitri, also known as Antonio Di Mitri, Tony Di Mitri, Tony Dimitri and George Stevenson (Manduria, 12 June 1931 – Rome, 8 December 2019), was an Italian actor and singer.

== Biography ==
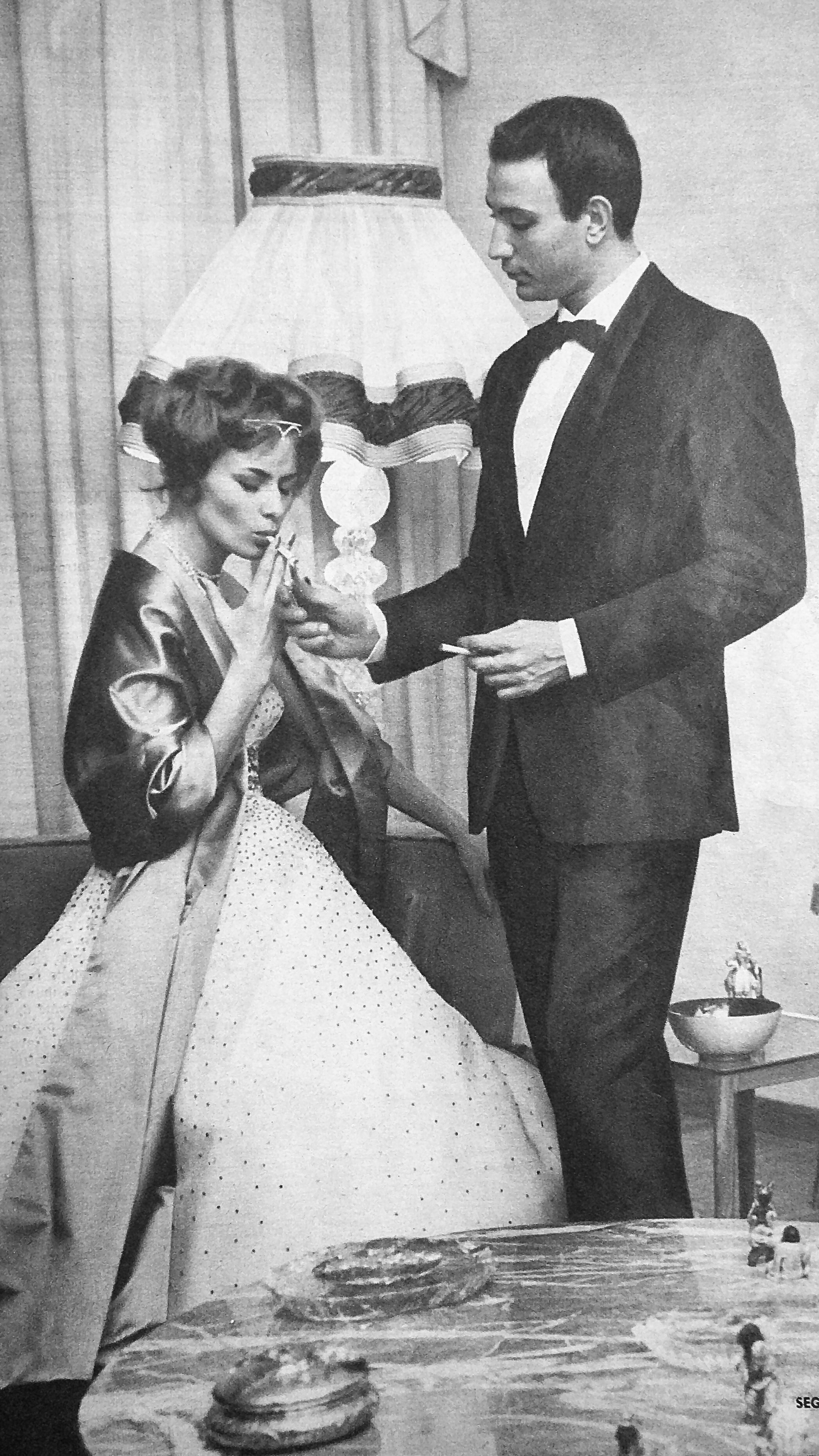
Antonio Dimitri in the Dolce Vita years.

Antonio Costanzo Dimitri was born in Manduria, a small town in Apulia from which he moved as a boy. After living in Turin for some years he decided to move to Rome, to attend the prestigious Accademia Nazionale di Arte Drammatica Silvio D'Amico. He debuted at the Greek Theater of Syracuse in "Hippolytus", directed by Orazio Costa. Shortly after he took part in several theatrical tours with Enrico Maria Salerno.

In 1953 Dimitri had his film debut in The Merchant of Venice by Pierre Billon and Senso by Luchino Visconti. Those were the years of the "Dolce Vita", where he had several relationships with well-known actresses such as Silvana Pampanini and Lea Massari.

In 1965 he started his singing career, releasing three singles under CGD : L'hanno ucciso a Roma, Hanno rapito il presidente and Un velo bianco. In the same years he was also co-protagonist, alongside Amedeo Nazzari, of Hanno rapito il presidente by Dino Verde.

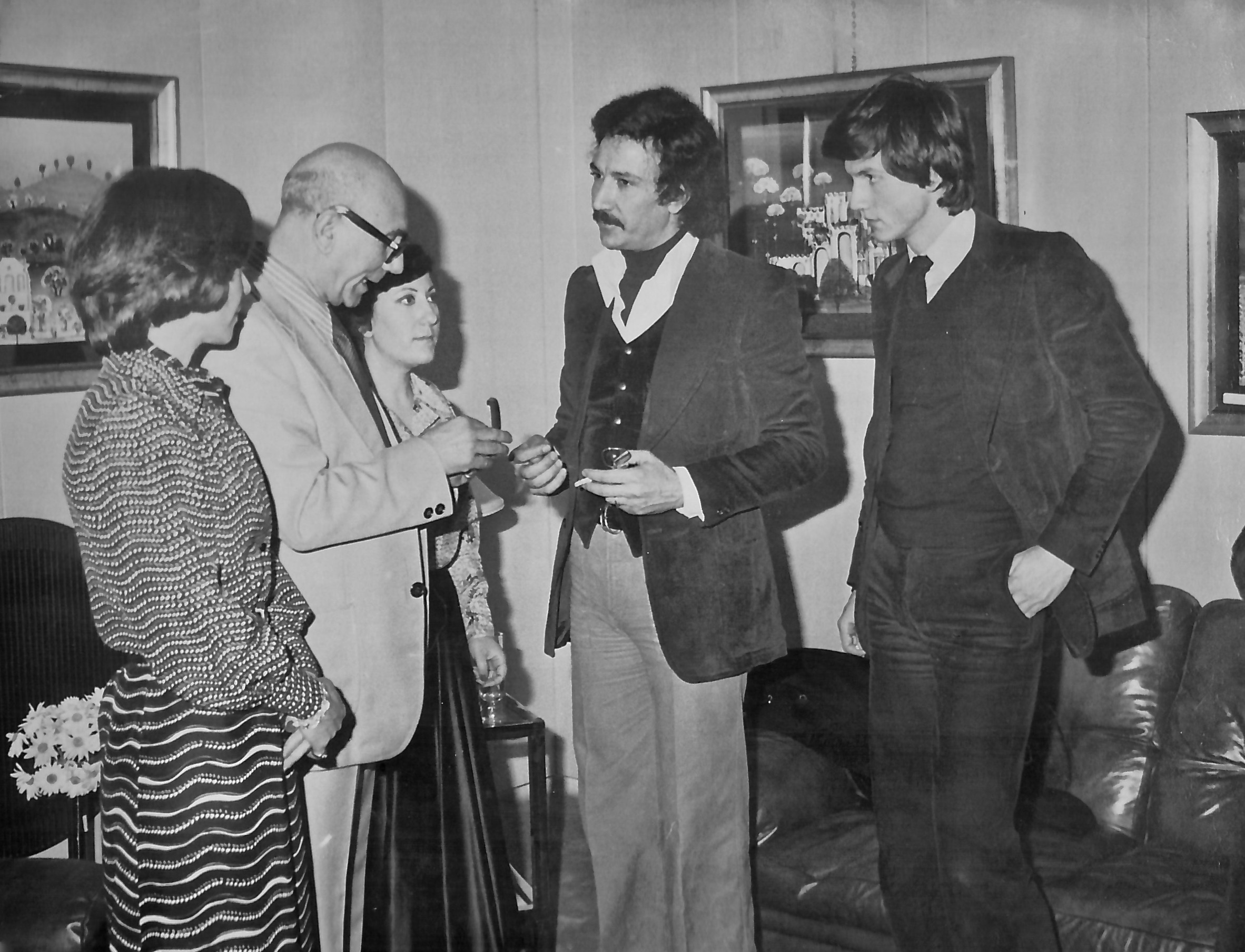
Tony Dimitri at a party in 1974

In '68 Dimitri was the protagonist, alongside Francesca Bertini, of the hit TV show La fiera dei Sogni, hosted by Mike Bongiorno. In '69 he joined the world-famous theatrical representation of Ariosto's Orlando Furioso directed by Luca Ronconi, where he played the part of King Suleiman the Magnificent.

In the early '70s he had profound spiritual awakening and decided to go back to his roots, studying and performing the traditional music of his region, the Salento. He released two folk albums I canti del prato verde (1972, as Antonio Di Mitri) and Taratatani (1974, as Antonio Dimitri).

In 1974 he played Yanez in the TV show The Tigers of Mompracen, alongside Gigi Proietti and directed by Ugo Gregoretti.

He died on 8 December 2019 at 88 years of age.

== Filmography ==
=== Film ===
- The Merchant of Venice (1953, directed by Pierre Billon)
- La Traviata (1953, directed by Vittorio Cottafavi) - Dancer at the Nightclub (uncredited)
- Senso (1954, directed by Luchino Visconti) - Un soldato (uncredited)
- Dinanzi a noi il cielo (1957, directed by Roberto Savarese)
- Il sole tornerà (1957, directed by Ferdinando Merighi)
- Sword Without a Country (1961, directed by Carlo Veo)
- Rome 1585 (1961, directed by Mario Bonnard)
- A Girl... and a Million (1962, directed by Luciano Salce) - James
- I normanni (1962, directed by Giuseppe Vari) - Oscar
- Shivers in Summer (1964, directed by Luigi Zampa) - The Model Quarrelling with della Pietra
- Two Mafiamen in the Far West (1964, directed by Giorgio Simonelli) - Jesse James
- Ali Baba and the Seven Saracens (1964, directed by Emimmo Salvi) - Sharif
- The Good, the Bad and the Ugly (1966, directed by Sergio Leone) - Deputy (uncredited)
- Code Name: Red Roses (1968, directed by Fernando Di Leo)
- May God Forgive You... But I Won't (1968, directed by Vincenzo Musolino) - Manuel Hernandez (uncredited)
- Quintana (1968, directed by Vincenzo Musolino) - Quintana
- Dal nostro inviato a Copenaghen (1970, directed by Alberto Cavallone) - Nick Valenti
- Una colt in mano al diavolo (1973, directed by Gianfranco Baldanello)
- Il giustiziere di Dio (1973, directed by Franco Lattanzi) - Ringo
- Six Bounty Killers for a Massacre (1973, directed by Franco Lattanzi) - Rinaldo
- Big Pot (1976, directed by Bruno Paolinelli) - Dr. Alfred Houseman
- Giallo alla regola (1988, directed by Stefano Roncoroni) - Killer #3 (final film role)

=== Television ===
- Il romanzo di un maestro (1959, TV Series, directed by Mario Landi) - Un amico di Carlotta
- Ritorna il tenente Sheridan (1963, TV Series) - Barman
- Caravaggio (1967, TV Series, directed by Silverio Blasi) - Un sergente
- Sheridan: Squadra omicidi (1967, TV Series, directed by Leonardo Cortese) - Wenger
- Joe Petrosino (1972, TV Series, directed by Daniele D'Anza) - Antonino Passananti
- Orlando Furioso (1974, TV Series, directed by Luca Ronconi) - Solidano
- The Tigers of Mompracen (1974, TV Series, directed by Ugo Gregoretti) - Yanes

== Partial discography ==
- 1972 – I canti del prato verde – Antiche canzoni regionali popolari italiane (as Antonio Di Mitri)
- 1974 – Taratatani – Antichi canti popolari della Puglia salentina (as Antonio Dimitri)
- 1977 – Rutulì rutulà – Il mondo è una rotella, volta gira e se ne va (as Antonio Dimitri)

=== Singles ===
- 1965 – L'hanno ucciso a Roma/Carnevale di sangue (as Tony Di Mitri)
- 1965 – Hanno rapito il presidente/Il telefono dell'incubo (as Tony Di Mitri)
- 1965 – Un velo bianco/La farfalla innocente (as Tony Di Mitri)
