= Final Pardon =

1952 film

- Directed by: Renato Polselli
- Written by: Renato Polselli; Giovanni d'Eramo
- Produced by: Tiziano Longo
- Starring: John Kitzmiller; Franca Marzi; Adriano Rimoldi
- Cinematography: Giuseppe Aquari
- Edited by: Guido Bertoli
- Music by: Salvatore Allegra
- Production company: Triestina Film
- Distributed by: Indipendenti Regionali
- Release date: June 1952
- Running time: 95 minutes
- Country: Italy
- Language: Italian

Final Pardon (Italian: Ultimo perdono) is a 1952 Italian melodrama film directed by Renato Polselli and starring John Kitzmiller, Franca Marzi, Adriano Rimoldi. The film's sets were designed by the art director Vittorio Valentini.

== Synopsis ==
An ex-convict believes he is employed to recruit young woman to work as dancers in a nightclub. He discovers he is in fact working for a gangster operating in the white slave trade. Amongst the girls he comes across, the ex-convict encounters a daughter he never knew he had.

== Cast ==
- Adriano Rimoldi as Renato Rocchi
- Franca Marzi as Moglie di Renato
- Olga Gorgoni as Amante del proprietario del night club
- Dante Maggio as Proprietario del night club
- John Kitzmiller as Ballerino
- Silvio Bagolini
- Renato Malavasi
- Paola Borboni
- Harry Feist
- Andrea Petricca
- Simona Andreassi
- Jenny Folchi
- Cesira Sainati

== Bibliography ==
- Chiti, Roberto & Poppi, Roberto. Dizionario del cinema italiano: Dal 1945 al 1959. Gremese Editore, 1991.
- Morreale, Emiliano. Così piangevano: Il cinema melò nell'Italia degli anni cinquanta. Donzelli Editore, 2011.
