= D'Annunzio (film) =

- Italian theatrical release poster by Renato Casaro
- Directed by: Sergio Nasca
- Written by: Sergio Nasca; Piero Chiara
- Starring: Robert Powell; Stefania Sandrelli
- Cinematography: Romano Albani
- Edited by: Nino Baragli
- Music by: Sergio Sandrelli
- Release date: 3 February 1987 (Italy)
- Running time: 113 min
- Country: Italy
- Languages: Italian; English

D'Annunzio (internationally released as D'Annunzio and I and Love Sin) is a 1987 Italian biographical film directed by Sergio Nasca.

== Plot summary ==
The film focuses on Decadentism, that developed in France and Italy in the late 19th century. Gabriele d'Annunzio is a renowned poet, coming from the rural region of Abruzzo, from the seaside town of Pescara. He is already famous for his aesthetic poetry, and he's also a journalist in Rome. There d'Annunzio begins to spend his days in worldly pleasure, living purely in the art world and in high society. He hates democracy, hates mass culture even more, and looks for passion and pleasure in the rich ladies of the court; until he meets Lady Elvira Fraternali Leoni, known affectionately as "Barbara". This love affair arouses in d'Annunzio the inspiration for the writing of his first great novel of Decadentism: Pleasure (Il Piacere).

== Background ==
While in Rome between 1891 and 1897, Emil Fuchs had an affair with Elvira Fraternali, and this affair is one of the sources for the plot.

== Cast ==
- Robert Powell as Gabriele D'Annunzio
- Stefania Sandrelli as Elvira Fraternali Leoni, called Barbara
- Laurent Terzieff as Michetti
- Florence Guérin as Clo Albrini
- Sonia Petrovna as Maria Cruyllas di Gravina
- Teresa Ann Savoy as Maria di Gallese
- Fiorenza Marchegiani as Olga Ossani
- Paolo Bonacelli as Ercole Leoni
- Roberto Alpi as Edoardo Scarfoglio
- Cesare Barbetti as De Bosis
- Eva Grimaldi as Viola

== Release ==
The film was released in Italy on 3 February 1987.

== See also ==
- List of Italian films of 1987
