= The Alcove =

1985 film

- Italian theatrical release poster by Enzo Sciotti
- L'alcova
- Directed by: Joe D'Amato
- Written by: Ugo Moretti
- Based on: "The Alcove", by Judith Wexley
- Starring: Lilli Carati; Laura Gemser
- Cinematography: Joe D'Amato
- Edited by: Franco Alessandri
- Music by: Manuel De Sica
- Production company: Filmirage
- Distributed by: C.R.C.
- Release date: 21 January 1985 (Italy)
- Running time: 86 minutes
- Country: Italy

The Alcove (Italian: L'alcova; also known as Lust) is a 1985 Italian erotic film directed by Joe D'Amato.

The film contains brief hardcore sex footage on a vintage film reel that the film's characters watch. Otherwise, it is a softcore film.

== Plot ==
It is the year 1936, Italy is in a state of euphoria because of its new African empire. A war veteran returns home from the Second Abyssinian War bringing back a black woman. This situation breaks the monotony and unravels the secret turbulent life of his family.

== Cast ==
- Lilli Carati as Alessandra
- Annie Belle as Virma
- Laura Gemser as Zerbal
- Al Cliver as Elio
- Roberto Caruso as Furio
- Nello Pazzafini as Peppe, the gardener

== Release ==
The film grossed 335,890,000 L.(US$175,950 – equivalent to $526,707 in 2025) on its release.

== See also ==
- List of Italian films of 1985
