= Al Cliver =

Italian actor (born 1951)

- Born: Pierluigi Conti; 16 July 1951 (age 74); Alexandria, Egypt
- Other names: Al Clever; Pier Luigi Conti; Michael Conti
- Occupation: Actor
- Years active: 1974–1990
- Partner: Annie Belle (1975–1978)

Pierluigi Conti (born 16 July 1951) is a retired Italian actor, known by the stage name Al Cliver. He is best known for starring in horror and exploitation films, especially ones by directors Lucio Fulci, Jesús Franco, and Joe D'Amato.

== Early life ==
Cliver was born Pierluigi Conti to Italian parents in Alexandria, Egypt. He began his career at the age of 16, as an actor and model in television commercials.

== Career ==
Cliver made his film debut at the age of 18, when he appeared in an uncredited bit part in Luchino Visconti’s The Damned (1969), playing a Brownshirt in the Night of Long Knives sequence.

He decided to use the name Al Cliver as his stage name, as it was trendy for Italian actors at that time to use American stage names. He decided on after Al Capone, or Al Pacino and his surname was taken from a death row prisoner who wrote a best selling book.

In 1974, he had his first starring role, in the romantic drama The Profiteer. His performance earned him a Nastro d'Argento Award nomination for Best New Actor.

He starred in erotic, adventure and crime movies, but he is mostly memorable for starring in exploitation and horror films such as Lucio Fulci's Zombi 2, The Black Cat, The Beyond and Demonia, and Jesús Franco's Mondo Cannibale and Devil Hunter.

== Personal life ==
From 1975 to 1978, he was in a relationship with French actress Annie Belle and has acted alongside her in the films Forever Emmanuelle, Blue Belle, Velluto Nero and Un Giorno alla fine di Ottobre. After their split they acted together in Molto di Più and L'Alcova.

Cliver was diagnosed with throat cancer in August 2008. He had to undergo surgery which has left him speaking strained in a mere whisper.

In 2018, Cliver published his memoirs, entitled Without Script.

As of 2024, he lives in Bali and is the owner and manager of holiday villas.

== Filmography ==
=== Film ===
Year	Title	Role	Notes
1969	The Damned	Brownshirt at Bad Wiessee	Uncredited
1969	Le 10 meraviglie dell'amore	Alfi	Credited as 'Michael Conti'
1974	The Profiteer	Ercole	
1975	Waves of Lust	Irem	
1976	Laure	Nicola	
1976	Blue Belle	Philip	
1976	Amore grande, amore libero	Marco	
1976	Big Pot	Michael Teague	
1976	Smooth Velvet, Raw Silk	Horatio	
1976	Mister Scarface	Rick	
1976	Apache Woman	Tommy	
1977	Un Giorno alla fine di Ottobre	Lorenzo	
1977	Death Hunt	Inspector Ettore Moretti	
1978	Provincia violenta	Roberto Mauri	
1978	Blazing Flowers	Domino	
1979	Zombi 2	Brian Hull	
1979	L'alberto della maldicenza	Franco	
1980	Flying Sex	Roman Tracy	
1980	Molto di più		
1980	Mondo Cannibale	Jeremy Taylor	
1980	Devil Hunter	Peter Weston	
1981	The Black Cat	Sgt. Wilson	
1981	The Beyond	Dr. Harris	
1983	2020 Texas Gladiators	Nisus	
1983	Notturno	Boris	Uncredited
1983	Endgame	Ron Shannon	
1983	I briganti	Massaroni	
1983	Hearts and Armour	Selvaggio	Credited as 'Pierluigi Conti'
1984	Warriors of the Year 2072	Kirk	
1984	Murder Rock	Voice Analyst	Uncredited
1985	The Alcove	Elio	
1986	The Mines of Kilimanjaro	Governor's Aide	
1986	A Lustful Mind	Roberto	
1987	Oggetto sessuale	Marcello	
1988	Touch of Death	Randy	
1990	Demonia	Porter	

=== Television ===
Year	Title	Role	Notes
1986	La piovra	Fiorito	2 episodes Credited as 'Pierluigi Conti'
1988	Sodoma's Ghost	Drunken Nazi	Television film Uncredited
1989	The House of Clocks	Peter	Television film
1990	Aquile	Instructor	1 episode Credited as 'Pier Luigi Conti'

== Awards and nominations ==
Institution	Year	Category	Work	Result
Nastro d'Argento	1975	Best New Actor	The Profiteer	Lost to Renato Pozzetto for To Love Ophelia
