= Le bar du téléphone =

1980 French crime film

- Directed by: Claude Barrois
- Written by: Claude Neron
- Produced by: Benjamin Simon
- Starring: Daniel Duval; François Périer; Georges Wilson; Julien Guiomar
- Cinematography: Bernard Lutic
- Edited by: Nicole Saunier
- Music by: Vladimir Cosma
- Release date: 1980
- Running time: 93 minutes
- Country: France

Le bar du téléphone is a 1980 French crime film directed by Claude Barrois. The story is based on a real 1978 gang-related shooting in Marseille.

== Plot summary ==
Le bar du téléphone follows Toni Véronèse, a crime boss targeted by rival gangsters. They bring in a small group led by Paul Franchi to kill him, which leads to a shooting inside the Telephone Bar.

== Cast and roles ==
- Daniel Duval - Toni Véronèse
- François Périer - Commissaire Claude Joinville
- Raymond Pellegrin - Robert Pérez
- Julien Guiomar - Antoine Bini
- Georges Wilson - Léopold Kretzchman
- Valentine Monnier - Maria
- Christopher Lambert - Paul 'Bébé' Franchi (credited as Christophe Lambert)
- Richard Anconina - Boum-Boum
- Patrick Laurent - Matelot
- Marc-Michel Bruyat - Barjol
- Philippe Brigaud - Samuel Pérez
- Henri Viscogliosi - Bernard Pérez
- Guy Régent - Henri Perez
- Jacques Ferrière - Max
- Pierre Julien - Petit Jeannot

== Production and release ==
The film was produced in France and released in 1980. It is described as a crime film and has a running time of 93 minutes.

== Reception ==
A review from CinéDweller described the film as a take on the gangster cinema of Jean-Pierre Melville. The critic mentioned the cast’s connection to Melville’s films and highlighted Daniel Duval’s performance.

== See also ==
- Jean-Pierre Melville
- Gangster film
