= Big Pot (film) =

1976 film

- Directed by: Bruno Paolinelli
- Written by: Karl Seipelt; Bruno Paolinelli
- Produced by: Bruno Paolinelli
- Starring: Al Cliver; Carole André; Fausto Tozzi; Claudine Auger
- Cinematography: Aldo Di Marcantonio
- Edited by: Bruno Paolinelli
- Music by: Giancarlo Chiaramello
- Release date: 1976
- Countries: Italy; Austria
- Language: Italian

Big Pot (Italian: Il colpaccio) is a 1976 crime film co-written and directed by Bruno Paolinelli under the pseudonym John L. Huxley. An Italian-Austrian co-production, it stars Al Cliver and Carole André.

== Cast ==
- Al Cliver as Michael Teague
- Carole André as Nicky Stone
- Fausto Tozzi as Mark Lemmon
- Claudine Auger as Maggie Vanderberg
- Gabriele Tinti as Sandro Vincenzoni
- Tony Dimitri as Dr. Alfred Houseman
- Mariangela Giordano as Sandro's lover
- William Berger as Mackenzie
- Edmund Purdom as Professor Vanderberg
- Franco De Rosa as Nick
- Philip Dallas as Prison Director
- Annie Belle as Blonde girl at the hotel
- Gianni Pulone as Mark's accomplice

== Production ==
The film was produced by Saba Cinematografica, C.A.R.F. and Neue Delta Film. It was shot between Amsterdam, Rome, London and Lake Como.

== Release ==
The film was released in Italian cinemas by Dear International on 16 June 1976.

== Reception ==
The film was a commercial failure, grossing just 116 million lire at the Italian box office. Film historian Roberto Curti described it as "a lighter affair compared to contemporaneous poliziotteschi, and more in the vein of 1960s heist films, with passable action and slight comedy undertones". Leonardo Autera from Corriere della Sera noted that "in addition to being overly drawn out in its suspense, thereby sacrificing its effectiveness, it suffers from a pervasive lack of logic that borders on naivety and that undermines the credibility of its characters".
