= Stato interessante =

- Directed by: Sergio Nasca
- Written by: Sergio Nasca; Maurizio Costanzo
- Cinematography: Giuseppe Aquari
- Music by: Ennio Morricone
- Release date: 1977
- Language: Italian

Stato interessante is a 1977 Italian comedy-drama film directed by Sergio Nasca. It consists of three segments, all sharing abortion as the main theme.

== Cast ==
=== First segment ===
- Janet Agren as Carla
- Duilio Del Prete as Federico
- Quinto Parmeggiani as Ignazio
- Clara Colosimo as the Aunt

=== Second segment ===
- Monica Guerritore as Annabella La Monica
- Turi Ferro: Domenico La Monica
- Franco Fabrizi as Gaetano La Monica
- Magali Noël as Tilde La Monica
- Laura D'Angelo as Annabella's Friend

=== Third segment ===
- Adriana Asti as Patrizia
- Enrico Montesano as Fernando
- Elisa Mainardi as Jolanda
