= Mombasa (song) =

1975 song by Taiska

"Mombasa" is a song by the Finnish singer Taiska (Hannele Aulikki Kauppinen). The song, named after the city in Kenya, was released in 1975 and it is Taiska’s most popular song.

== History ==
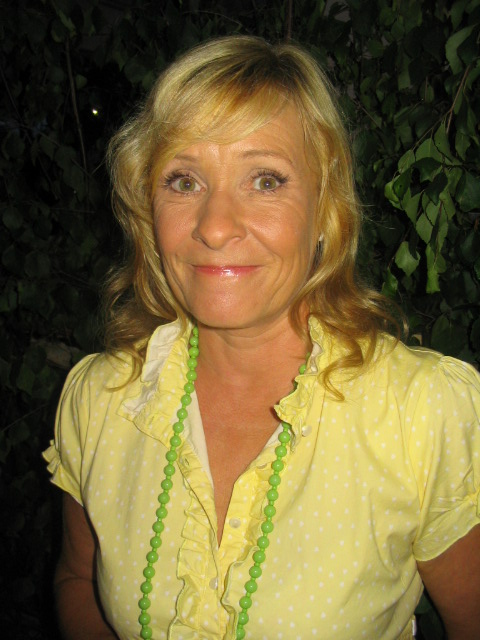
Taiska in 2007

"Mombasa" was made in 1975. For this song, Taiska used the melody of a musical composition by Fabio Frizzi. This composition, named Ibo lele, was used in the Italian erotic film Amore libero - Free Love, directed by Pier Ludovico Pavoni. Jyrki Lindström wrote the lyrics for "Mombasa".

== In popular culture ==
- Hannu Tuomainen used this song as an inspiration for his film One-Way Ticket to Mombasa.
- "Mombasa" is mentioned in the book Crime Novel: Nordic noir like nothing you've read before by Petri Tamminen.
