= Smooth Velvet, Raw Silk =

- Directed by: Brunello Rondi
- Written by: Ferdinando Baldi; Brunello Rondi
- Starring: Laura Gemser; Annie Belle; Al Cliver; Gabriele Tinti
- Cinematography: Gastone Di Giovanni
- Edited by: Bruno Mattei
- Music by: Alberto Baldan Bembo
- Distributed by: Variety Distribution
- Release date: 1976
- Running time: 96 min.
- Country: Italy
- Languages: English; Italian

Smooth Velvet, Raw Silk (also known as Velluto nero and Black Emmanuelle, White Emmanuelle) is a 1976 sexploitation film directed by Brunello Rondi. Despite the alternate title, and the presence of Laura Gemser, it has no relation to other Emanuelle films and doesn't feature any characters with that name.

== Plot ==
After being left by her husband, Crystal, a wealthy European woman, moves with Magda, one of her daughters, to a mansion in Egypt. Living a life of luxury, the women are attended by their servant Ali. Crystal finds him attractive and occasionally sleeps with him. Magda, on the other hand, likes to kiss and tease Ali, but refuses to have sex with him. Both women also end up infatuated with Horatio, a white European that is starting to become a powerful spiritual guru in the region. Both of them like to sleep with Horatio, but Crystal seems to specially care for him.

Following a yearly tradition, Crystal invites her friend, fashion model Laura, to Egypt. Along with her comes Carlo, Laura's abusive husband. He works as photographer for a pornographic magazine and likes to take pictures of his wife in various stages of undress near putrid things, like dead animals. Laura finds this habit humiliating, but obeys her husband's every whim nonetheless.

The five visit Hal, an old homosexual man that, after failing to have a career as a Hollywood actor, lives in a nearby palace. There, mother and daughter become victim of Horatio's power of suggestion and give in to their deepest desires. In front of everybody, and with some help from Hal, Crystal and Magda have a threesome with Horatio. Laura is deeply shocked by this, but cannot help but keep watching them.

Later, Pina, Crystal's other daughter, comes to visit and is intermediately smitten by Laura. She accompanies Laura and her husband to a photo shoot through Egypt. Marco soon drives them to the scene of a recent massacre and forces Laura to pose with the dead bodies. Seeing how painful this is for Laura, Pina attacks and shouts at Marco, but only manage to make him more aggressive. In a fit of rage, Marco rapes Laura while Pina walks away, unable to do anything else. The trio later drives to a place near a village, where the people dispense bags of excrement into a big pile. Marco forces Laura to pose at the top of the pile, while the villagers keep throwing away excrement near her. Tired of the way she is being treated, Laura runs away from the pile, takes Marco's jeep and drives away with Pina, leaving his husband in the middle of the desert. While he looks for a way to get back to Crystal's mansion, Pina and Laura spend the afternoon visiting local sites and getting to know each other. Pina suggests visiting a whorehouse, and Laura has her doubts, but eventually agrees. Once there, the pair sits down and watch two lesbians making love. Aroused by this, Pina and Laura get a room of their own and have sex.

When everyone returns to the mansion, things seem to get back to normal. The only difference is that, now, Pina and Marco openly hate each other. Returning to Hal's palace, the group is witness to Horatio's power of suggestion once again. He hypnotises Laura, who starts having visions of her being naked with the guru. In this state, she starts having convulsions and even kills a goat with a knife. When she finally snaps out of her trance, she breaks up with Marco and leaves the building. Horatio then tries to use his power on Pina, who is immune to it. She mocks him and calls him a liar. Intrigued by this, Horatio becomes increasingly attracted to Pina.

During a visit to a temple, the two talk things out and she confesses to also have feelings for him. They end up having sex. After realizing that Horatio is in love with Pina and plans to leave Egypt with her, Crystal breaks down and tries to commit suicide. Seeing that her relationship with Horatio is seriously hurting her mother, Pina decides to leave the group without him, and chooses to be with Laura instead.

== Cast ==
- Laura Gemser as Laura
- Annie Belle as Pina
- Al Cliver as Horatio
- Gabriele Tinti as Carlo
- Feodor Chaliapin Jr. as Hal
- Ziggy Zanger as Magda
- Nieves Navarro as Crystal (credited as Susan Scott)
- Tarik Ali as Ali
