= Annie Belle =

French actress and social worker (1956–2024)

- Annie Belle in Jean Rollin's Lèvres de sang (1975)
- Born: Annie Sylvie Brilland; 10 December 1956; Paris, France
- Died: 27 January 2024 (aged 67); Lannemezan, France
- Other names: Annie-Belle; Annie Bell; Annie Briand
- Occupations: Actress; Social worker
- Years active: 1974–1989
- Partner: Al Cliver (1975–1978)

Annie Sylvie Brilland (10 December 1956 – 27 January 2024) was a French actress and social worker. Her acting career began in 1974. Throughout the 1970s and 1980s she had varied roles in both French and Italian cinema, working with such directors as Jean Rollin, Ruggero Deodato, and Joe D'Amato.

== Early life ==
Belle was born in Paris, France and came from a family of engineers. Acting may have seemed to be an odd career choice for her when she was young but she was quite a natural at it. Belle's acting career began to take shape when she attended the Rue Blanche acting school in Paris under master Virilo. Belle explained this in an interview for the Italian book 99 Donne in the 1990s.

== Career ==
Belle had starred in her first role before she had turned eighteen, in the 1974 Jean Rollin film Tout le Monde il en a Deux (Bacchanales Sexuelles) in which she only had a small role, but a memorable one. Rollin had loved working with Belle so he had decided to cast her in his 1975 film Lèvres de sang (Lips of Blood). Those were her only times working with the director. Not long after filming Lévres de Sang, Belle moved to Italy and for a brief time became one of the most in demand actresses in Italian exploitation cinema, having starred in three major films in 1976 alone: Forever Emmanuelle, Blue Belle, and Velluto Nero. Blue Belle was one of the key points in Belle's career, a film in which she had a co-writing credit, calling the director of the movie, Massimo Dallamano, "a great professional and a talented man". One of Belle's most controversial films was Velluto Nero. Belle remembered Forever Emmanuelle as a "not very good" film.

In the early 1980s, Belle starred in Italian films The House on the Edge of the Park, which she remembered as being very "cruel" and also very "interesting" and two Joe D'Amato films, Absurd and L'alcova.

Personal problems slowed Belle's acting career down in the 1980s. In 1989 she starred in her final film Fuga dalla morte and then she retired from acting.

=== Other work ===
After returning to France, Belle went to school and received a degree in psychology and was a social worker for people diagnosed with mental illness.

== Personal life and death ==
Belle had a three-year relationship with actor Al Cliver. It lasted between 1975 and 1978, during which they acted in four films together, Belle's three films from 1976, Forever Emmanuelle, Blue Belle and Velluto Nero and her 1977 film Un Giorno alla fine di Ottobre. After their split they occasionally acted together in films such as Molto di più and L'alcova.

Belle died on 27 January 2024, at the age of 67.

== Filmography ==
Film
| Year | Title | Role | Notes |
|---|---|---|---|
| 1974 | Tout le monde il en a deux | Brigitte | Other title: Bacchanalles Sexuelles & Fly Me the French Way |
| 1974 | Le rallye des joyeuses | La jeune fille amoureuse | Other title: Sex Rally |
| 1975 | Lèvres de sang | Jennifer | Other title: Lips of Blood (English title) |
| 1975 | Le sexe à la barre | (Unknown role) | |
| 1975 | Closed Up-Tight | Burglar's Daughter | |
| 1976 | Laure | Laure | Other title: Forever Emmanuelle |
| 1976 | La fine dell'innocenza | Annie | Other title: Blue Belle & Annie (also co-writer) |
| 1976 | Big Pot | Ragazza bionda all'hotel | Other title: Il colpaccio (uncredited role) |
| 1976 | Velluto nero | Pina | Other title: Black Emmanuelle, White Emmanuelle |
| 1977 | Solo cuando deseo | Dyanne | Other title: The Night of the High Tide & Twilight of Love |
| 1977 | Un giorno alla fine di ottobre | Cristina | |
| 1977 | Mogliamante | Clara | Other title: Wifemistress |
| 1977 | Climax | Ana | |
| 1979 | Switch | Dory | |
| 1980 | Molto di più | Annie | |
| 1980 | La casa sperduta nel parco | Lisa | Other title: The House on the Edge of the Park |
| 1980 | La compagna di viaggio | Jennifer | Other title: The Traveling Companion |
| 1981 | Rosso sangue | Emily | Other title: Absurd, Antropophagus 2 & Horrible |
| 1982 | La nuit de Varennes | Prostitute with green stockings | Other title: That Night in Varennes |
| 1982 | Fuga dall'arcipelago maledetto | Kia | Other title: Tiger Joe |
| 1982 | Liar's Moon | Nurse Nancy | |
| 1982 | Pronto... Lucia | Lucia Catalano | |
| 1983 | O' surdato 'nnammurato | Daniela | |
| 1983 | Nana | Rennee de Chéselles | Other title: Nana, the True Key of Pleasure |
| 1983 | Al bar dello sport | Martine | |
| 1983 | Zampognaro innamorato | Filomena | |
| 1983 | L'ammiratrice | Francesca | (voice dubbed by Margherita Sestito) |
| 1985 | L'alcova | Velma | Other title: The Alcove & Lust |
| 1985 | Uccelli d'Italia | Second Slapping Actress | |
| 1986 | La venexiana | Spettatrice | Other title: The Venetian Woman |
| 1987 | La croce dalle 7 pietre | Maria | Other title: Cross of the Seven Jewels |
| 1989 | Luna di sangue | Brigitte Garré | Other title: Escape from Death |

Television
| Year | Title | Role | Notes |
|---|---|---|---|
| 1978 | Allons au cinéma | Herself | 1 episode |
| 1981 | La nouvelle malle des Indes | Angèle | Miniseries (episode 3) |
| 1982 | Storia d'amore e d'amicizia | Marlene | Miniseries (episodes 1, 2 & 3) |
| 1982 | Quattro sotto l'ombrello | (Unknown role) | TV movie |
| 1983 | Il passo falso | (Unknown role) | TV movie |
| 1984–1985 | Quei trentasei gradini | Ersilia | Miniseries (episodes 1, 2 & 3) |
| 1985 | Quo Vadis? | Myriam | Miniseries (episode 1) |
| 1987 | La voglia di vincere | Michelle | Miniseries (episodes 1 (uncredited), 2, & 3) |
| 1988 | Gli indifferenti | (Unknown role) | Miniseries |
