= Laure (film) =

- Directed by: Louis-Jacques Rollet-Andriane; Roberto D'Ettorre Piazzoli
- Written by: Louis-Jacques Rollet-Andriane; Ovidio G. Assonitis
- Produced by: Ovidio G. Assonitis
- Cinematography: Roberto D'Ettorre Piazzoli
- Music by: Franco Micalizzi
- Release date: 1976
- Running time: 89 minutes
- Language: English
- Budget: $2 million

Laure (also known as Forever Emmanuelle and Laura) is a 1976 Italian erotic film directed by Louis-Jacques Rollet-Andriane and Roberto D'Ettorre Piazzoli, even though the film was advertised as directed by Emmanuelle Arsan.

== Plot ==
At a research institute in Manila, visitors discuss the Mara, an isolated island tribe whose annual rebirth festival involves some members losing their memories and starting new lives. Laure, the director's daughter, attracts the attention of Nicola, a European photographer. The two begin a relationship and travel to the island with anthropologist Gualtier and his partner Myrte to witness the festival. As they approach the island, the group faces the possibility of leaving their former lives behind and joining the tribe.

== Cast ==
- Annie Belle as Laure
- Al Cliver as Nicola
- Orso Maria Guerrini as Professor Gualtier Morgan
- Michele Starck as Natalie Morgan
- Emmanuelle Arsan as Myrte

== Production ==
The first choice for the title role was Linda Lovelace, but due to her personal problems at the time, she was first recast in the secondary role of Natalie Morgan, and eventually put out of the film. It was shot in the Philippines and in Rome on a reported budget of $2 million. The producer, Assonitis, and advertised director, Arsan, took their names off of the film.

== Release ==
The film was distributed in certain territories by 20th Century Fox and was not released in English-speaking countries until December 1982.
