= Turi Ferro =

Italian actor

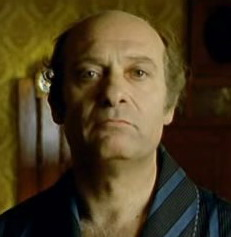
- Ferro in Malicious (1973)
- Born: Salvatore Ferro; 10 January 1921; Catania, Sicily, Italy
- Died: 10 May 2001 (aged 80); Catania, Sicily, Italy
- Occupation: Actor
- Years active: 1962-1998
- Spouse: Ida Carrara
- Children: 3

Salvatore "Turi" Ferro (10 January 1921 – 10 May 2001) was an Italian film, television and stage actor. He is considered the most important actor in the Sicilian theatre post-World War II era.

== Life and career ==
Born in Catania, Ferro launched his own theatrical company in 1953 alongside his wife, actress Ida Carrara. He later staged a great number of works by Sicilian authors. He was one of the co-founders of the Teatro Stabile di Catania. His stage credits include works directed by Roberto Rossellini and Giorgio Strehler.

From the early 1970s he started appearing in RAI Television, in appreciated and successful TV-series. His film career is less prolific (he appeared in only 33 films between 1962 and 1998), but includes notable roles in popular titles as the Mafioso of The Seduction of Mimi and "Ignazio" of Malizia. In 1974 he received a special David di Donatello for "the value and success of his performances".

The film director Lina Wertmüller referred to him as "the greatest Sicilian actor after Angelo Musco". He died of a myocardial infarction.

== Partial filmography ==
- A Man for Burning (1962) - Don Vincenzo
- Extraconiugale (1964) - Padre di Renato (segment "La moglie svedese")
- I Knew Her Well (1965) - Il commissario
- Rita the Mosquito (1966) - Sicilian professor
- Don't Sting the Mosquito (1967)
- Seven Times Seven (1968) - Bernard
- Un caso di coscienza (1970) - Judge
- Scipio the African (1971) - Giove Capitolino
- The Case Is Closed, Forget It (1971) - Chef of Prison Guards
- The Sicilian Checkmate (1972) - Judge Nicola Altofascio
- Chronicle of a Homicide (1972) - Commissario Malacarne
- The Seduction of Mimi (1972) - Don Calogero / Vico Tricarico / Salvatore Tricarico
- Malicious (1973) - Ignazio
- La governante (1974) - Leopoldo Platania
- Virility (1974) - don Vito
- Il lumacone (1974) - Gianni
- Vergine e di nome Maria (1975) - Don Vito
- I baroni (1975) - Il barone Leopoldo Lalumera
- Che notte quella notte! (1977) - Maurizio
- Stato interessante (1977) - Domenico La Monica (second story)
- Blood Feud (1978) - Vito Acicatena
- Ernesto (1979) - Carlo Wilder
- The Turn (1981) - Don Diego Alcozér
- La posta in gioco (1988) - Prosecutor Mario Bellomo
- Malizia 2mila (1991) - Ignazio / Husband
- You Laugh (1998) - Dottor Ballarò (segment "Due sequestri")
