= Massacre in Dinosaur Valley =

1985 cannibal film directed by Michele Massimo Tarantini

- Italian-language release poster
- Directed by: Michele Massimo Tarantini
- Written by: Michele Massimo Tarantini
- Starring: Michael Sopkiw; Suzane Carvalho; Milton Rodríguez; Marta Anderson; Joffre Soares
- Production companies: Doral Film; DMV Distribuzione
- Release date: 1985
- Running time: 88 minutes
- Countries: Italy; Brazil
- Languages: Portuguese; Italian

Massacre in Dinosaur Valley (Italian: Nudo e selvaggio, lit. 'Naked and Savage'), also known as Amazonas and Cannibal Ferox II, is a 1985 cannibal film directed by Michele Massimo Tarantini under the pseudonym Michael E. Lemick. An international co-production of Italy and Brazil, the film was written by Tarantini with Dardano Sacchetti, and stars Michael Sopkiw, Suzane Carvalho, Milton Rodríguez, Marta Anderson, and Joffre Soares.

== Cast ==
- Michael Sopkiw as Kevin Hall
- Suzane Carvalho as Eva Ibañez
- Milton Rodríguez as Captain John Heinz
- Marta Anderson as Betty Heinz
- Joffre Soares as Josè
- Gloria Cristal as Myara
- Susan Hahn as Belinda

== Production ==
The film was shot in Brazil in 1985 under the working title of Stranded in the Valley of Dinosaurs.

== Reception ==
A reviewer credited as "Lor." of Variety reviewed the Lightning Video home video on January 10, 1987. "Lor." described the film as a "poor Italian exploitation film, made worse by an intentionally misleading title: there are no dinosaurs or fantasy elements in this potboiler." The review concluded that "This sexploitationer mixes prat-fall comedy, disrobing women and the usual gore carelessly."

== Home media ==
On 29 September 2020, the film was released on DVD and Blu-ray by Severin Films.
