= Sergio Nasca =

Italian film director and screenwriter

- Born: 1 August 1937; Rome
- Died: 14 August 1989 (aged 52); Rome
- Occupations: film director, screenwriter

Sergio Nasca (1 August 1937 – 14 August 1989) was an Italian film director and screenwriter.

== Life and career ==
Born in Rome, Nasca started his career in 1965 as assistant director of Enzo Battaglia in Idoli controluce, then he worked as a production manager. He made his directorial debut with the 1974 film Il saprofita, which raised several controversities for its polemic plot and its violence. His cinema was initially characterized by violent provocations gradually tempered by bittersweet tones. He died at the age of 52 of an incurable disease.

== Filmography ==
- 1974: Il saprofita
- 1975: Malía (vergine e di nome Maria)
- 1977: Stato interessante
- 1982: Il paramedico
- 1985: D'Annunzio
- 1987: La posta in gioco
