= The Profiteer =

- Directed by: Sergio Nasca
- Cinematography: Giuseppe Aquari
- Music by: Sante Maria Romitelli
- Distributed by: Variety Distribution
- Release date: 1974
- Country: Italy
- Language: Italian

Il saprofita (internationally released as The Profiteer) is a 1974 Italian drama film directed by Sergio Nasca. It marked the directorial debut of Nasca and raised some controversies due to its polemic plot and its violence.

== Cast ==
- Al Cliver : Ercole
- Valeria Moriconi : The Baroness Clotilda
- Janet Agren : Teresa
- Giancarlo Marinangeli: Parsifal
- Cinzia Bruno: Brunilde
- Leopoldo Trieste : Don Vito
- Rina Franchetti : Bigot
- Nerina Montagnani : The servant of the Holy Man
- Clara Colosimo : Lady at the wake
- Giancarlo Badessi : Superior of the Seminary
- Carlo Monni : General Augusto Bezzi

== Plot ==
In a small town in Apulia, the seminarian Ercole, who failed to become a priest due to an injury that caused him to lose his speech, is hired as a driver and male nurse by a rich and apparently pious family of landowners, and soon becomes the lover of the beautiful Baroness Clotilde.
