= Tim Street =

American film producer

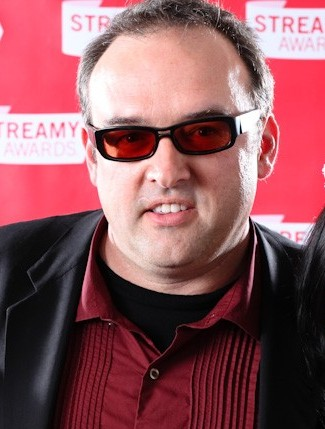
- Street at the 2009 Streamy Awards
- Occupations: Director, writer, producer, and new media consultant

Tim Street is an American writer, producer, director, and new media consultant. He is the Creator/Executive Producer of the video series French Maid TV. In 2007, Street was elected to the advisory board for the Association for Downloadable Media (ADM), an industry association for episodic and downloadable media. In 2009, he was inducted into the International Academy of Web Television.

== Career ==
Street has written, directed, and produced promos, long-form content, and interstitial programs for cable and network television. He won the Promax BDA Awards for Directing and Producing Promos 2003 and 2006 and served as a judge for the 2005 Promax BDA Awards Home Entertainment Competition.

In 1999 Street set out to create an interactive story that would use the Internet as a platform. He came up with a factitious site that appeared to be set up by a man who was madly in love with a young woman named Julie, Fortheloveofjulie.com, which generated 300,000 page views in one day as well as the attention of the Los Angeles Police Department, Santa Monica Police Department and the Los Angeles County Sheriff's Department. CNN referred to the site as “Red Hot”, while Wired News called it, "one of the Internet’s creepiest sites… and one of the most convincing hoaxes to hit the Net since the great virgin caper of 1998 at ourfirstime.com." Street went on to create additional story-based sites, My Son Peter (a site by a man who plays hide-and-seek with his son who has been dead), Zach Mango (Jon Cryer's character in The Trouble with Normal), and Fight Club (Tyler Durden's behind-the-scenes online journal.)

French Maid TV was created in December 2005 when Street began creating content with integrated advertising. French Maid TV consisted of short videos of women in French maid costumes that teach skills like How to Make a Video Podcast. Each video was sponsored and hosted by Revver. The six episodes combined have been viewed over 30 million times. Each two-minute video cost roughly $10,000 to produce.
