= George Eastman (actor) =

Italian actor and screenwriter (1942–2026)

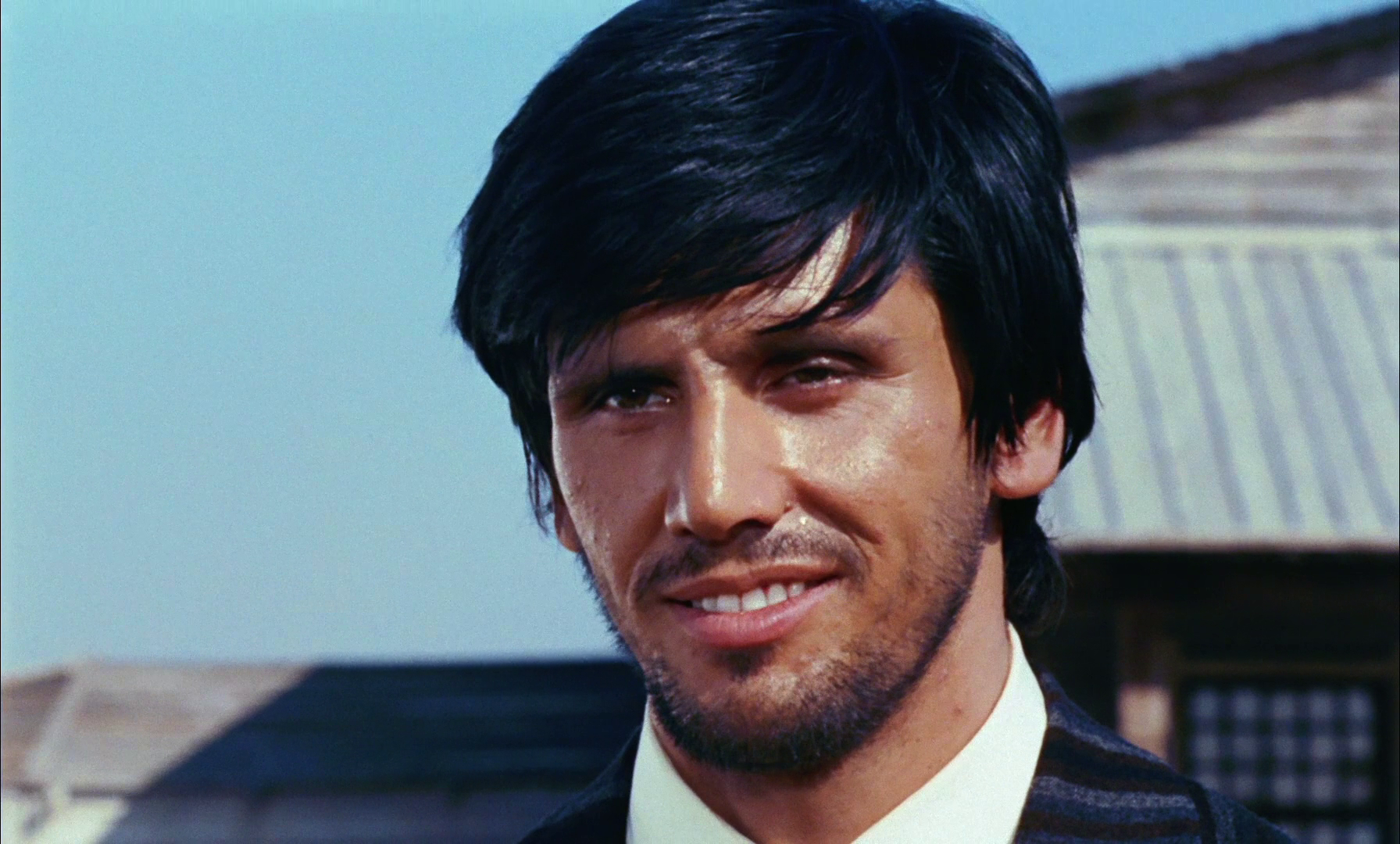
- Eastman in Django, Prepare a Coffin (1968)
- Born: Luigi Montefiori; 16 August 1942; Genoa, Italy
- Died: 19 May 2026 (aged 83); Rome, Italy
- Education: Centro Sperimentale di Cinematografia
- Occupations: Actor; screenwriter
- Years active: 1966–2004
- Height: 6 ft 9 in (206 cm)
- Spouse: Manuela Romano (m. 1987)
- Relatives: Briga (son-in-law)

Luigi Montefiori (16 August 1942 – 19 May 2026), better known by the stage name George Eastman, was an Italian actor and screenwriter. He participated in many of the genre film trends of Italian cinema, but was best known for his frequent collaborations with director Joe D'Amato, both as an actor and as a screenwriter.

Eastman portrayed cannibalistic serial killer Klaus Wortmann in the 1980 horror film Antropophagus, and also played a similar role in its 1981 follow-up, Absurd. Both films were directed by D'Amato and written by Eastman.

== Early life and education ==
Eastman was born in Genoa in 1942. He moved to Rome as a young man, and initially worked as a commercial artist and graphic designer. Developing an interest in acting, he studied acting under Alessandro Fersen and at the Centro Sperimentale di Cinematografia (under Nanni Loy).

== Career ==
The young actor took his anglicized alias "George Eastman" (after Montgomery Clift's character in A Place in the Sun) when he was cast as a villain or "heavy" in many Spaghetti Westerns made in the late 1960s and early 1970s. In 1972, he played the villain in The Call of the Wild which starred Charlton Heston and was directed by Ken Annakin.

He later became a regular performer in many movies directed by Joe D'Amato, for whom he also wrote many screenplays. Their first work together was Cormack of the Mounties (aka Giubbe rosse) in 1975.

Eastman was a very familiar face in Italian B-cinema in the early 1980s, being generally cast as a villain, thanks to his towering 6'9" height and his dark and menacing looks. He co-starred in many Italian science fiction films such as Bronx Warriors, The New Barbarians, Endgame, Ironmaster, 2020 Texas Gladiators, and After the Fall of New York. His most famous movie is the gory horror film Anthropophagous, directed by Joe D'Amato in 1980, in which he played the monster. He also starred in D'Amato's Erotic Nights of the Living Dead, Porno Holocaust, and Absurd (aka Anthropophagous 2).

Two of his greatest major villain roles were in Rabid Dogs (aka Kidnapped, 1974) and Blastfighter (1984). He appeared in Paramount's 1985 biblical film King David playing Goliath in David's childhood flashback scene. In 1986, he performed as Stefano in the movie Regalo di Natale, directed by Pupi Avati. He also wrote and directed the science fiction film Metamorphosis/ DNA Formula Letale (produced by Joe D'Amato) in 1990, after which he quit acting to concentrate on his screenwriting. In 2003, he returned to acting in Christmas Rematch, a film directed by Pupi Avati.

== Personal life and death ==
Eastman married Manuela Romano in 1987. They had three children, including actress Arianna Montefiori (b. 1994). Singer Briga was his son-in-law.

Eastman's tall stature (2.06m, or 6ft 9in) was one of his signatures.

Eastman died in Rome on 19 May 2026, at the age of 83.

== Partial filmography ==
Title	Year	Credited as			Role	Notes	Refs.
Title	Year	Actor	Screenwriter	Story author	Role	Notes	Refs.
Django Shoots First	1966	Yes			Jesse Kluster		
My Name Is Pecos	1966	Yes			Member of Kline's group		
Django Kills Softly	1967	Yes			Bill		
The Last Killer	1967	Yes			Ramon/Chico		
Poker with Pistols	1967	Yes			Lucas		
Django, Prepare a Coffin	1968	Yes			Lucas		
Bootleggers	1969	Yes			McGowan "The Irish"		
Fellini Satyricon	1969	Yes			The Minotaur		
Bastard, Go and Kill	1971	Yes			—N/a		
Ben and Charlie	1972	Yes			Charlie		
The Call of the Wild	1972	Yes			Black Burton		
Baba Yaga	1973	Yes			Charlie		
Scalawag	1973	Yes			Don Aragon		
A forza di sberle	1974	Yes					
Cormack of the Mounties	1975		Yes				
Blood and Bullets	1976	Yes			Dan Caputo, "Knell"		
Keoma	1976		Yes	Yes			
Canne mozze	1977		Yes				
Sesso nero	1980	Yes	Yes	Yes	Voyakis		
Antropophagus	1980	Yes	Yes		Nikos Karamanlis	Also producer	
Porno Holocaust	1981	Yes			Professor Lemoine		
1990: The Bronx Warriors	1983	Yes			—N/a		
Ironmaster	1983	Yes			Vood		
The New Barbarians	1983	Yes			One		
2019, After the Fall of New York	1983	Yes			Big Ape		
Blastfighter	1984	Yes			Tom		
Delirium	1987	Yes			Alex		
The Barbarians	1987	Yes			Jacko		
Il deserto del fuoco	1997		Yes			Television film	
Rabid Dogs	1998	Yes			Trentadue / Thirty-two		
2020 Texas Gladiators	—N/a		Yes	Yes			
Emanuelle's Revenge	—N/a	—N/a	Yes		Carlo		
The Cobra	—N/a	—N/a	Yes		Crane		
Emanuelle Around the World	1977	Yes			Guru Shanti		
L'Inspettore Giusti	—N/a		Yes				
Master Stroke	—N/a	—N/a	Yes		Western actor		

- The Belle Starr Story (1968) directed by Lina Wertmüller
- Chuck Moll (1970)
- The Three Musketeers of the West
- House of Pleasure for Women (1976)
- Orgasmo Nero (1980) directed by Joe D'Amato
- Hard Sensations (1980) directed by Joe D'Amato
- Erotic Nights of the Living Dead (1980) directed by Joe D'Amato (Eastman also wrote this film)
- Absurd (1981) directed by Joe D'Amato (Eastman also wrote this film)
- Caligula... The Untold Story (1982) directed by Joe D'Amato
- The Bronx Warriors (1982) directed by Enzo G. Castellari
- Endgame (1983) directed by Joe D'Amato (Eastman also wrote this film)
- Detective School Dropouts (1986) directed by Filippo Ottoni
- Hands of Steel (1986) a.k.a. Fists of Steel, a.k.a. Vendetta Dal Futuro, directed by Sergio Martino
- Christmas Present (1986) directed by Pupi Avati
- Delirium/Photos of Joy (1987) directed by Lamberto Bava
- Crystal or Ash, Fire or Wind, as Long as It's Love (1989) directed by Lina Wertmüller
- Metamorphosis (1990) a.k.a. DNA Formula Letale (Eastman wrote and directed this film)
- Christmas Rematch (2004) directed by Pupi Avati

== Screenplays ==
- Giubbe rosse (1974), aka Red Coats, aka Cormack of the Mounties, directed by Joe D'Amato
- Candido Erotico (1978)
- La Ragazza del Vagone Letto (1979)
- The Great Alligator River (1979), directed by Sergio Martino (Eastman got plot credit only)
- Sesso nero/ Black Sex (1980), directed by Joe D'Amato
- Erotic Nights of the Living Dead (1980), directed by Joe D'Amato (Eastman also co-starred in this film)
- Absurd/Rosso sangue (1981), directed by Joe D'Amato (Eastman co-starred in this film as the monster)
- Caligula... The Untold Story (1982), directed by Joe D'Amato
- Endgame (1983), directed by Joe D'Amato (Eastman co-starred in this film as well)
- Stage Fright (1987), a.k.a. Deliria, directed by Michele Soavi (Eastman has an uncredited role in this film, playing the masked killer)
- Metamorphosis (1990), a.k.a. DNA Formula Letale (Eastman directed this film, and had a cameo role in it as well)
- Il Principe del Deserto (TV serial)
- The Son of Sandokan (1998), made-for-TV movie
