= Vergine e di nome Maria =

1975 film

- Directed by: Sergio Nasca
- Cinematography: Giuseppe Aquari
- Music by: Sante Maria Romitelli
- Release date: 1975
- Language: Italian

Vergine e di nome Maria (Virgin and Called Mary) is a 1975 Italian comedy-drama film directed by Sergio Nasca. A few days after its first release it was confiscated for contempt of religion; it was subsequently re-edited and redistributed under the title Malía.

== Cast ==
- Turi Ferro as Don Vito
- Andréa Ferréol as Maddalena
- Cinzia De Carolis as Maria
- Alvaro Vitali as Rocco
- Clelia Matania as Anna
- Renato Pinciroli as Giuseppe
- Leopoldo Trieste as Nicola
- Enzo Cannavale as Simone
- Jean Louis as Luca
- Sandro Dori asMatteo
- Marino Masè as Gabriele
- Tino Carraro as the Bishop
- Giancarlo Badessi
