= 2020 Texas Gladiators =

- Middle East theatrical release poster
- Directed by: Joe D'Amato; George Eastman
- Screenplay by: George Eastman; Aldo Florio
- Story by: George Eastman; Aldo Florio
- Starring: Al Cliver; Sabrina Siani; Peter Hooten
- Cinematography: Joe D'Amato
- Edited by: Caesar White
- Music by: Francis Taylor
- Production company: Eureka Cinematografica
- Distributed by: Eureka Cinematografica
- Running time: 91 minutes
- Country: Italy

2020 Texas Gladiators (Italian: Texas 2000) is an Italian science fiction action film co-directed by Joe D'Amato and George Eastman. The film is set in a post-apocalyptic Texas, where a band of warriors fight against a fascist regime that is trying to take control of the remaining population.

== Plot ==
Following bitter wars and natural disasters, the earth is devastated, depopulated, and chaotic, with morality and law in disarray. Marauding gangs terrorize the remaining peaceful gatherings of people, who often congregate around churches. A small group of volunteers, the Rangers, fight back against injustice.

In Texas in 2020, degenerate villains raid a monastery in which pretty Maida took refuge, when five roving Rangers show up. The battle-hardened men quickly succeed in repelling the attackers and restoring order. However, during the incident, one of her saviors named Catch Dog falls into disgrace as he tries to rape Maida. His comrades eventually reject him. Later, Ranger Nexus separates from his friends, taking Maida with him.

Five years later, Nexus and Maida live with their little daughter a seemingly safe life in the settlement of Free Town. In addition to basic services, the community operates a power plant and uranium mine. The village's energy reserves soon lure in dark outlaws. One day, disaster strikes as Catch Dog manages to bring down Free Town with his gang. Catch Dog himself acts on behalf of the "Black One", a totalitarian ruler who subjugates the population with his thugs. In an attempt to resist, Nexus dies. The able-bodied men are enslaved and used as laborers in the uranium production; the women are sold to different bars in the area.

At some point, the three remaining Rangers meet Maida and set her free from her master, a gambler. The three encounter and manage to enlist the help of an indigenous tribe. Ultimately, the Rangers and the recruited warriors succeed in taking back Free Town. The regime of terror is overthrown. Both Catch Dog and Black One are killed, and in the midst of combat, also one of the Ranger succumbs to his injuries. In the end, Maida and her daughter can expect a happier future. The two remaining Rangers leave.

== Production ==
In a 1996 interview, D'Amato stated that Eastman "didn't feel confident enough in the action scenes and so I dealt with those, leaving him to the direction of the actors. But in this case, the name recorded at the Ministry (director's credit) was mine." D'Amato received directing credit, although Eastman directed most of the dialogue scenes according to D'Amato. Eastman also stated in 1996, that "These (post-atomic) films, which were made in the wake of the various Mad Max movies, were decidedly crummy. The set designs were poor....and the genre met a swift and well-deserved death. I only wrote these awful movies for financial reasons....no attempt at originality was made at all."

== Release ==
2020 Texas Gladiators was passed by Italian censors in 1984. The film has been released under several titles, including Anno 2020: I Gladiatori del Futuro (lit. Year 2020: Gladiators of the Future), Futoro, 2020: Freedom Fighters, 2020: The Rangers of Texas and Sudden Death. The film was released on VHS in 1985 by Media Home Entertainment.

== Reception ==
In his book Horror and Science Fiction Film IV, Donald C Willis described the film as an "undistinguished actioner" that had a "long wait for the climactic novelty of a battle waged with bows and arrows, cycles, shields, rifles, machine guns, and hatchets" Donald Guarisco of AllMovie wrote how the film did not "follow the usual formula of ripping off The Road Warrior or Escape from New York (though it does take some visual cues from those sources)." but was closer to a Spaghetti Western that was "updated with some futuristic gadgetry." The review referred to the story telling as "fairly brain-dead", noting that first half of the film is hard to follow as it moved from scene to scene with no transitions or any connecting scenes to explain a passage of time. The review commented on the characters as "cardboard" and the dialogue as "often hilarious" noting that "there is some type of action every few minutes in this flick. The end result is daft but never dull and that duality makes Anno 2020 - I Gladiatori Del Futuro good late-night fodder for fans of trashy b-movies."

TV Guide referred to the film as "an inept action picture" that was derivative of the "infinitely superior "Mad Max" series" and that "One can go on and on pointing out the innumerable problems of the film or that the director must be morally spent, but the fact will remain that 2020 Texas Gladiators is nothing but more egesta from the Italian exploitation factory."

== See also ==
- List of action films of the 1980s
- List of Italian films of the 1980s
- Mad Max series legacy and influence in popular culture
