= Michael Sopkiw =

American actor

- Born: January 12, 1954 (age 72); Connecticut, United States
- Occupations: Film actor, model

Michael Sopkiw is an American former actor who starred in four Italian B movies in two years. He was born in 1954 in Connecticut. Alongside Italian action star Mark Gregory, both are noted as the most-recognizable stars of the 1980s post-apocalyptic era of science fiction-based action films released in Europe.

Sopkiw took modeling jobs, and he was employed in Italy by filmmaker Sergio Martino to star in 2019, After the Fall of New York (1983). Lamberto Bava (the son of famous movie-maker Mario Bava) then recruited Sopkiw to shoot two movies in the United States, Blastfighter (1984) and Monster Shark (1984). His fourth and final film, Massacre in Dinosaur Valley, was released in 1985 and directed by Michele Massimo Tarantini.

Retiring from acting, Sopkiw studied medicinal plant science. He managed the California division of the European-based MIRON Violetglass, which imports and distributes special glass bottles designed to protect plant-based contents from the sun.
