= Blastfighter =

- Directed by: Lamberto Bava
- Screenplay by: Massimo De Rita; Luca De Rita
- Story by: Morando Morandini; Francesco Costa
- Starring: Michael Sopkiw; Valentina Forte; George Eastman
- Cinematography: Gianlorenzo Battaglia
- Edited by: Roberto Sterbini
- Music by: Fabio Frizzi
- Production companies: Medusa Distribuzione; National Cinematografica; Nuova Dania Cinematografica; Films Jacques Leitienne
- Distributed by: Medusa Distribuzione
- Release date: July 25, 1984 (Italy)
- Countries: Italy; France

Blastfighter is a 1984 action film directed by Lamberto Bava starring Michael Sopkiw and George Eastman.

== Plot ==
Jake "Tiger" Sharp (Michael Sopkiw) is a former policeman who seeks revenge after his wife is murdered. After killing the murderer, Sharp is sentenced to seven years in prison. Upon release Jake is given an SPAS-12 Shotgun by his old friend Jerry in order to wreak vengeance upon the crooked attorney responsible for sending him away. However, Jake instead at the last minute decides to return to his secluded cabin in the Appalachian wilderness and bury his gun in the floorboards. Matters become complicated when a group of poachers run afoul of him and kill his baby deer. Jake goes to the Chinese herbal medicinist's office that the hunters have been selling to and smashes up the place.

Jake's estranged daughter Connie then joins him with Jerry and her boyfriend, but all of them are killed off when the hunters decide to get revenge for scaring away the herbal medicinist. Jake manages to escape back to his cabin and dig up his gun for one last battle with those who would break the law.

== Production ==
Blastfighter was initially going to be a post-apocalyptic film directed by Lucio Fulci with screenwriter Dardano Sacchetti as a follow-up to Warriors of the Year 2072. Sacchetti later explained that Fulci argued with the producers, which led to it being settled in court. The film had already been sold without the original intended script being able to be used, so Lamberto Bava's Blastfighter only retains the title of the original Fulci production.

Blastfighter was shot in the state of Georgia.

As part of the plot for Once Upon a Time in Hollywood, the film's character Rick Dalton (Leonardo DiCaprio) starred in a fictionalized version of Blastfighter that loosely followed the plot of the real Michael Sopkiw-version, with some differences. In the alternate version, Dalton portrayed a former New York City cop released from a ten-year prison sentence. Dalton moved to a mountain home to rebuild his life, only for local poachers to kidnap and kill his daughter; he sought revenge against the backwoods thugs responsible. On-screen, the movie featured a VHS cover of Leonardo DiCaprio’s face replacing Michael Sopkiw’s.

== Release ==
Blastfighter was released theatrically in Italy where it was distributed by Medusa Distribuzione on 25 July 1984.

== Footnotes ==
=== References ===
- Howarth, Troy (2015). Splintered Visions: Lucio Fulci and His Films. Midnight Marquee Press, Inc. ISBN 978-1936168538.
- Paul, Louis (2005). Italian Horror Film Directors. McFarland. ISBN 978-0-7864-8749-3.
