= List of Italian films of 1988 =

A list of films produced in Italy in 1988 (see 1988 in film):

Title	Director	Cast	Genre	Notes
1988
32 dicembre	Luciano De Crescenzo	Luciano De Crescenzo, Caterina Boratto, Enzo Cannavale	comedy	
Abel's Island	Michael Sporn	Tim try	animation	Emmy Award nominated
Accadde a Parma	Paolo Cavara	Gianni Cavina	drama	filmed in 1981
Adelmo	Rocco Mortelliti	Pietro Bontempo	drama	
Alan Ford e il gruppo TNT contro Superciuk	Max Bunker		animation	based on the comic Alan Ford
Alien Terminator	Nello Rossati	Franco Nero, George Kennedy	science fiction-action	
L'altro enigma	Vittorio Gassman, Carlo Tuzii	Vittorio Gassman, Annie Girardot, Fanny Ardant	drama	television film
Un amore di donna	Nelo Risi	Claudine Auger	drama	
Amore sporco	Joe D'Amato	Valentine Demy	erotic	
Angel Hill: l'ultima missione	Ignazio Dolce	Richard Hatch	war	
Angela come te	Anna Brasi	Barbara De Rossi, Antonella Ponziani	drama	
L'appassionata	Gianfranco Mingozzi	Piera Degli Esposti	drama	
Appuntamento a Liverpool	Marco Tullio Giordana	Isabella Ferrari	drama	
Arrivederci e grazie	Giorgio Capitani	Ugo Tognazzi, Anouk Aimée, Ricky Tognazzi	comedy	
Blu elettrico	Elfriede Gaeng	Claudia Cardinale, William Berger	Drama	
La Bohème	Luigi Comencini	Barbara Hendricks, José Carreras	romance	
Una botta di vita	Enrico Oldoini	Alberto Sordi, Bernard Blier	comedy	
The Brother from Space	Mario Gariazzo	Martin Balsam, Agostina Belli	science-fiction	
Bye Bye Baby	Enrico Oldoini	Carol Alt, Luca Barbareschi, Brigitte Nielsen	romance	
I cammelli	Giuseppe Bertolucci	Paolo Rossi, Diego Abatantuono, Giulia Boschi	comedy	
Caruso Pascoski di padre polacco	Francesco Nuti	Francesco Nuti, Clarissa Burt, Ricky Tognazzi	comedy	
Cavalli si nasce	Sergio Staino	Paolo Hendel, Vincent Gardenia, Delia Boccardo	comedy	
Cinema Paradiso	Giuseppe Tornatore	Philippe Noiret, Salvatore Cascio, Marco Leonardi	Drama	
Come sono buoni i bianchi	Marco Ferreri	Maruschka Detmers, Michele Placido	comedy	
The Commander	Antonio Margheriti	Lewis Collins, Lee Van Cleef, Donald Pleasence	war	
Compagni di scuola	Carlo Verdone	Carlo Verdone, Christian De Sica, Nancy Brilli	comedy	
Cream Train	Andrea De Carlo	Sergio Rubini, Carol Alt, Cristina Marsillach	romance	
Dear Gorbachev	Carlo Lizzani	Harvey Keitel	Drama	entered the 45th Venice International Film Festival
Disamistade	Gianfranco Cabiddu	Joaquim de Almeida, Massimo Dapporto	drama	
Delitti e profumi	Vittorio De Sisti	Jerry Calà, Umberto Smaila	giallo	
Domino	Ivana Massetti	Brigitte Nielsen, Tomas Arana, Kim Rossi Stuart	romance	
Don Bosco	Leandro Castellani	Ben Gazzara, Patsy Kensit	biographical-drama	
Evil Clutch	Andrea Marfori	Coralina Cataldi Tassoni, Diego Ribon	Horror	
Fair Game	Mario Orfini	Trudie Styler, Gregg Henry, Bill Moseley	thriller	
Fantozzi va in pensione	Neri Parenti	Paolo Villaggio, Milena Vukotic, Gigi Reder	comedy	
Festa di Capodanno	Piero Schivazappa	Johnny Dorelli, Eleonora Giorgi, Gloria Guida	comedy	television film
Il frullo del passero	Gianfranco Mingozzi	Philippe Noiret, Ornella Muti	drama	
The Gamble	Carlo Vanzina	Matthew Modine, Faye Dunaway, Jennifer Beals, Ian Bannen	comedy	
Ghosthouse	Umberto Lenzi	Lara Wendel	horror	
I giorni del commissario Ambrosio	Sergio Corbucci	Ugo Tognazzi, Carlo Delle Piane, Claudio Amendola, Amanda Sandrelli	crime	
Grandi cacciatori	Augusto Caminito	Harvey Keitel, Klaus Kinski	adventure	
Grosso guaio a Cartagena	Tommaso Dazzi	Franco Nero, Barbara De Rossi	Adventure	
Iguana	Monte Hellman	Everett McGill	Adventure	
Gli invisibili	Pasquale Squitieri	Giulia Fossà	drama	
It's Happening Tomorrow	Daniele Luchetti	Paolo Hendel, Margherita Buy, Nanni Moretti	comedy	Screened at the 1988 Cannes Film Festival
Just A Damned Soldier	Ferdinando Baldi	Peter Hooten, Mark Gregory	War, Action	Italian-Filipino co-production
Killing Birds	Claudio Lattanzi, Joe D'Amato	Robert Vaughn, Lara Wendel	horror	
The Kiss of Judas	Paolo Benvenuti	Carlo Bachi	Drama	
Love Dream	Charles Finch	Christopher Lambert, Diane Lane, Francesco Quinn	Adventure	
La leggenda del santo bevitore	Ermanno Olmi	Rutger Hauer, Anthony Quayle, Dominique Pinon		4 David di Donatello. Golden Lion winner. 2 Nastro d'Argento
The Little Devil (Il piccolo diavolo)	Roberto Benigni	Roberto Benigni, Walter Matthau, Stefania Sandrelli, Nicoletta Braschi	Comedy	David di Donatello best actor (Benigni)
The Mask	Fiorella Infascelli	Helena Bonham Carter	romance	Screened at the 1988 Cannes Film Festival
Mia moglie è una bestia	Castellano & Pipolo	Massimo Boldi, Eva Grimaldi	comedy	
Mignon Has Come to Stay	Francesca Archibugi	Stefania Sandrelli, Massimo Dapporto	drama	
Moving Target	Marius Mattei	Ernest Borgnine, Linda Blair, Stuart Whitman	Thriller	
Natura contro	Antonio Climati	Bruno Corazzari	horror	
Nightmare Beach	Umberto Lenzi	John Saxon, Michael Parks	horror	
La notte degli squali	Tonino Ricci	Treat Williams, Antonio Fargas	Action	
The Opponent / Uppercut Man	Sergio Martino	Daniel Greene, Giuliano Gemma, Ernest Borgnine	sport	
Phantom of Death	Ruggero Deodato	Michael York, Edwige Fenech, Donald Pleasence	Giallo	
Qualcuno in ascolto	Faliero Rosati	Vincent Spano	thriller	
I ragazzi di via Panisperna	Gianni Amelio	Mario Adorf, Ennio Fantastichini	biographical-drama	
Ratman	Giuliano Carnimeo	David Warbeck, Janet Agren, Eva Grimaldi	horror	
Riflessi di luce / Reflections of Light	Mario Bianchi	Pamela Prati, Laura Gemser, Gabriele Tinti	erotic	
Robowar	Bruno Mattei	Reb Brown, Catherine Hickland	sci-fi-action	Italian-Filipino co-production
Rorret	Fulvio Wetzl	Lou Castel, Anna Galiena	Thriller	
Run for Your Life	Terence Young	David Carradine, Lauren Hutton, George Segal, Franco Nero	sport-drama	last film of Terence Young
Russicum / The Third Solution	Pasquale Squitieri	Treat Williams, F. Murray Abraham, Danny Aiello	thriller	
Se lo scopre Gargiulo	Elvio Porta	Giuliana De Sio, Richard Anconina	crime-comedy	
Sodoma's Ghost	Lucio Fulci	Al Cliver	horror	
The Spider Labyrinth	Giagni	Roland Wybenga, Paola Rinaldi, Margareta von Krauss	Horror	
Stradivari	Giacomo Battiato	Anthony Quinn, Stefania Sandrelli, Valérie Kaprisky	biographical	
Strike Commando 2	Bruno Mattei	Brent Huff, Richard Harris, Mel Davidson, Mary Stavin	War, Action	
Taxi Killer	Stelvio Massi	Chuck Connors	action	
Ten Zan: The Ultimate Mission	Ferdinando Baldi	Frank Zagarino	science fiction-action	North Korean co-production.
Thunder Warrior	Larry Ludman	Mark Gregory, Raimund Harmstorf, Bo Svenson	Action	
Topo Galileo	Francesco Laudadio	Beppe Grillo, Jerry Hall	comedy	
Touch of Death	Lucio Fulci	Brett Halsey	horror	
Vampire in Venice	Augusto Caminito	Klaus Kinski, Christopher Plummer, Donald Pleasence	horror	
Una notte, un sogno	Massimo Manuelli	Sergio Rubini, Claire Nebout	comedy	
Via Paradiso	Luciano Odorisio	Michele Placido, Ángela Molina	drama	
La visione del sabba	Marco Bellocchio	Béatrice Dalle, Daniel Ezralow	drama	
Il volpone	Maurizio Ponzi	Paolo Villaggio, Enrico Montesano, Eleonora Giorgi	comedy	
Witchery	Fabrizio Laurenti	David Hasselhoff, Catherine Hickland, Linda Blair	horror	
Woman in the Moon	Vito Zagarrio	Greta Scacchi, Tim Finn	romance	
Young Toscanini	Franco Zeffirelli	C. Thomas Howell, Elizabeth Taylor, Franco Nero	biographical	
Zombi 3	Lucio Fulci	Deran Sarafian	horror	
Zoo	Cristina Comencini	Asia Argento	comedy	

== See also ==
- 1988 in Italian television
