= Witchery (film) =

1989 Italian horror film

- Italian film poster for Witchery
- Directed by: Fabrizio Laurenti
- Screenplay by: Daniele Stroppa
- Story by: Daniele Stroppa
- Produced by: Aristide Massaccesi
- Starring: David Hasselhoff; Linda Blair; Catherine Hickland; Annie Ross
- Cinematography: Gianlorenzo Battaglia
- Edited by: Rosanna Landi
- Music by: Carlo Maria Cordio
- Production company: Filmirage Production Group
- Distributed by: Aristi Associati/Gruppo Berna
- Release date: 6 August 1989 (Italy)
- Running time: 95 minutes
- Country: Italy

Witchery (Italian: La Casa 4 - Witchcraft) is a 1989 Italian horror film directed by Fabrizio Laurenti and starring David Hasselhoff, Catherine Hickland, Hildegard Knef, Linda Blair, and Annie Ross.

== Plot ==
Sexually repressed virgin student Leslie is visiting an island off the coast of Massachusetts along with her photographer boyfriend Gary. They're researching a derelict hotel the locals believe to be haunted by a witch.

While Leslie and Gary work on their project, a family comes to the island to inspect the hotel: greedy matriarch Rose Brooks, her husband Freddie, young son Tommy, and pregnant stepdaughter Jane. They are visiting the place because Rose plans to buy the hotel and turn it into a private club. They're accompanied by the lustful Linda Sullivan, a young architect hired to provide an estimate for the renovations, and real estate agent Jerry Giordano.

After a storm leaves the guests unable to leave the island, they are attacked and murdered one by one by the Lady in Black, an evil witch who was once a famous movie star and is now carrying out a gruesome demonic ritual that involves four elements: greed, lust, a pregnant woman, and the defiling of a virgin. Rose is burned alive, while Linda and Jerry are captured while having sex, then tortured and crucified. Freddie and Gary are killed too, after Leslie is raped by a demon during a satanic ceremony. Ultimately, Jane becomes possessed by the witch and confronts Leslie and Tommy. She begins to choke her little brother, causing him to drop the tape recorder Jane had given him as a gift. The recorder plays a message Tommy had created for his sister, expressing his love for her. This succeeds in temporarily breaking the witch's hold on Jane, who throws herself out of a window to her death in order to prevent the witch from regaining control. Leslie, the only survivor along with Tommy, wakes up in a hospital bed, where she is horrified to learn that she was impregnated during the ceremony.

== Cast ==
- David Hasselhoff as Gary
- Linda Blair as Jane Brooks
- Catherine Hickland as Linda Sullivan
- Annie Ross as Rose Brooks
- Hildegard Knef as Lady in Black
- Michael Manchester as Tommy Brooks
- Leslie Cumming as Leslie
- Bob Champagne as Freddie Brooks
- Rick Farnsworth as Jerry Giordano

== Production ==
The financial success of Ghosthouse (1988), which was titled La casa 3 – Ghosthouse in Italy, led to producer Aristide Massaccesi and distributor Achille Manzotti to develop an in-name only sequel. The director of the initial film, Umberto Lenzi, suggested a story for a sequel which he described as being similar to Psycho (1960), but felt that the producers had no interest in it. The film's screenplay and story is credited to Daniele Stroppa, but Claudio Lattanzi stated that he also worked on the story at Stroppa's location, as he was going to direct it.

Lattanzi urged producer Massaccessi to hire actress Bette Davis for the role of the witch in the film, but later cast Hildegard Knef in the role. Other cast members include David Hasselhoff, who was popular in Italy due to his series Knight Rider and, under Lattanzi's suggestion, Leslie Cumming, who had previously been in Killing Birds (1988). Early on, Lattanzi left the production and was replaced with Luigi Cozzi, who left the film two weeks into pre-production, finding the story "too predictable and banal".

Cozzi was in turn replaced with Fabrizio Laurenti, who had previously debuted with his 30-minute vampire film titled The Immigrant (1986). Massaccesi said he liked The Immigrant enormously, but noticed on set that Laurenti had difficulties working with an international cast, including Blair and Hasselhoff. Massaccesi agreed to finance Laurenti's next film, despite feeling the director "still [had] a long way to go".

Filming for Witchery commenced on March 16, 1988, in Scituate and Cohasset, Massachusetts. The film's score by Carlo Maria Cordio was taken from Killing Birds and was used again later in La Casa 5 (1990).

== Release ==
Witchery was released as early as 1 December 1988 in West Germany. This was followed by a theatrical release in Japan on 1 July 1989 and a home video release in the United States on 6 July before being released theatrically in Italy on 6 August, where it was distributed by Aristi Associati/Gruppo Berna. Film historian Roberto Curti noted that the film did very well financially in Italy, becoming the 60th highest-grossing film of the year with 1,283,194,000 Italian lire. This placed the film below James Cameron's The Abyss that year.

Following Witchery, Laurenti made another film for Massaccesi titled The Crawlers (1991).

== Reception ==
Italian film critic Maurizio Porro, writing for Corriere della Sera, recommended the film to genre fans who would "enjoy ... the usual American-style doggerel on family neuroses". In the United States, "Lor." of Variety reviewed the Vidmark video cassette, stating that the film was a "well-made Italian gore thriller", adding that its "in-jokes make it fun for horror fans, though some grisly gore content marks it toward the hardcore fringe".

== See also ==
- La Casa series - an Italian rebranding of several otherwise unrelated horror films, including Witchery.
- List of Italian films of 1988
- List of horror films of 1988
- List of works by David Hasselhoff

== Footnotes ==
=== Sources ===
- Curti, Roberto (2019). Italian Gothic Horror Films, 1980-1989. McFarland. ISBN 978-1476672434.
- Gomarasca, Manlio (May 2008). "Claudio Lattanzi, La verita secondo Claude Milliken". Nocturno Dossier (in Italian). No. 7.
- Lor. (1991). Variety's Film Reviews 1989-1990. Vol. 21. R. R. Bowker. There are no page numbers in this book. This entry is found under the header "May 10, 1989". ISBN 0-8352-3089-9.
- Palmerini, Luca M.; Mistretta, Gaetano (1996). Spaghetti Nightmares. Fantasma Books. ISBN 0963498274.
- Porro, Maurizio (23 August 1989). "Quei Fantasmi maligni inclusi nel prezzo". Corriere della Sera (in Italian).
