= Ghosthouse (film) =

- Directed by: Umberto Lenzi
- Screenplay by: Umberto Lenzi
- Story by: Umberto Lenzi
- Produced by: Aristide Massaccesi
- Starring: Daniela Barnes; Greg Rhodes; Kristen Fourgerosse; Mary Sellers
- Cinematography: Franco Delli Colli
- Edited by: Rosanna Landi
- Music by: Piero Montanari
- Production company: Filmirage Production Group
- Distributed by: Gruppo
- Release dates: January 1988 (Avoriaz Fantastic Film Festival); 21 May 1988 (Japan); 11 August 1988 (Italy)
- Running time: 95 minutes
- Country: Italy

Ghosthouse (Italian: La casa 3–Ghosthouse) is a 1988 Italian horror film written and directed by Umberto Lenzi. It co-starred Lara Wendel and Donald O'Brien. The plot focuses on a deserted house where the visions of a ghostly girl and her haunted doll wreak havoc on those who enter it.

== Plot ==
In 1967, a man named Sam Baker finds his young daughter, Henrietta, hiding in the basement after killing her cat with a pair of scissors. Sam locks up his daughter in the basement, telling her that she has to be punished for what she did. Sam later tells his wife that he thinks their daughter is under a spell or a curse, a theory that Henrietta's mother adamantly rejects. Afterward, Sam and his wife are brutally murdered by an unseen killer. While her parents are being murdered upstairs, Henrietta cries in the basement. She finds comfort in holding a strange clown doll, which plays eerie lullaby music.

Twenty years later, an amateur radio operator named Paul Rogers picks up a signal of two people screaming, presumably before being attacked. Paul somehow manages to track down where the screaming occurred and travels there with his girlfriend, Martha. The young couple arrives at the place where the screams took place, the same house where the Baker family used to live. There, they are harshly greeted by a hostile caretaker named Valkos, who tries to scare them away and accuses them of snooping around. Martha tells Paul that she does want to get out of there because the house gives her a bad feeling and that it has an evil aura.

The young couple breaks into the house to come across a group of four young intruders: three siblings, Jim, Tina, and Mark Dalen, and Mark’s girlfriend, Susan. Jim owns a radio, and his voice sounds exactly like the person that Paul heard screaming the night before through his own radio. Paul, who conveniently recorded those screamings on tape, allows Jim to listen to the recordings, and though the latter admits that the voice in that tape sounds exactly like his, he denies being that person.

Later that day, in the basement, Jim encounters the spirit of Henrietta, who smiles at him in a macabre way, carrying the clown doll in her arms while the terrifying lullaby music begins to sound. Unable to move and escape, Jim starts to scream desperately, just as he was heard screaming on Paul's recording from the day before. An old and rusty fan begins to move its blades until one of them comes off, cutting Jim's neck, who dies instantly. Right after this, Valkos, the house's caretaker, tries to attack Tina, Susan, and Mark, who manage to escape him. When the police arrive to investigate Jim's death, they wrongly assume that he was murdered by the deranged Valkos, implying that the old man has a bizarre fixation with the house and considers it his own.

Paul and Martha leave the house and carry out an investigation regarding the previous owners of the place. Paul discovers that Sam Baker (Henrietta's father) used to work as a funeral director and had a habit of stealing personal items from the dead. He also discovers that Henrietta's doll was a toy that her father Sam had stolen from a dead child. Paul and Martha return to the infamous house to advise Mark, Tina, and Susan to leave, assuming they are in great danger, but things do not go as planned. Finally, all the occupants of the old house come face to face with Henrietta's spirit or witness strange and supernatural events that result in their deaths. In the end, only Paul, Martha, and Susan survive the strange and deadly events. Before leaving the place, Susan asks who Henrietta was, to which Paul answers that she was an ordinary girl until her father gave her the clown doll.

Later, we see Martha and Paul taking a walk downtown when Martha is shocked to see the scary-looking clown doll that Henrietta owned displayed in a store window. The clown begins to smile evilly. After this, while Paul is crossing the street, the traffic lights abruptly go from red to green, which leads to Paul being hit by a bus, while Martha screams, horrified.

== Cast ==
- Lara Wendel as Martha
- Greg Scott as Paul Rogers
- Mary Sellers as Susan
- Ron Houck as Mark Dalen
- Martin Jay as Jim Dalen
- Kate Silver as Tina Dalen
- Donald O'Brien as Valkos
- Kristen Fougerousse as Henrietta Baker

== Production ==
Towards the end of the 1980s, the Italian genre film industry was producing less material. Independent companies began focusing on foreign markets where their products would sell more easily, either theatrically or on home video. One company was Aristide Massaccesi's Filmirage, founded in 1980. It began producing low-budget horror films by the mid-1980s, including Deran Sarafian's Interzone, Michele Soavi's Stage Fright and Umberto Lenzi's Ghosthouse.

Despite the credits citing one Cinthia McGavin as the screenwriter, the screenplay was written by Lenzi. Lenzi first wrote Ghosthouse's story in January 1987 and found Italian and American funding from through producer Roberto Di Girolamo, who later left the project due to financial issues. This led to Massaccesi entering the project as a producer. The film consequently was shot in the United States in mid 1987, other Filmirage productions were also filmed in the United States. The film was shot in Boston and Cohasset, Massachusetts.

== Release ==
Ghosthouse was first shown at the Avoriaz Fanstastic Film Festival in France in January 1988. This was followed by screenings in Japan on May 21. The film was released on home video in the United Kingdom by Colourbox in March.

The film was eventually picked up by distributor Achille Manzotti who re-titled the film in Italy as La Casa 3-Ghosthouse where the film was distributed by Gruppo on August 11. Naming horror films "La Casa" with houses in their titles was a popular trend in 1980s Italy, which began with the American films The Evil Dead and Evil Dead 2 being retitled La Casa and La Casa 2 respectively. Massaccesi said "Manzotti's idea to change the title to "La Casa 3" (made the film a success). If he'd left the original title "Ghosthouse", hardly anyone might have gone to see it".

The financial success of Ghosthouse led to Massaccesi and Manzotti to follow up the film with another sequel, La Casa 4.

== Reception ==
In contemporary reviews, Giovanna Grassi of Corriere della Sera praised only the cinematography by Franco Delli Colli and score by Piero Montanari, ultimately blaming the films' "great confusion and lack of accuracy". Philip Nutman and Mario Cortini wrote in Gorezone that Ghosthouse offered "no real surprises [...] but it's a competent 90 minutes with a reasonable body count and pints of the old red stuff". "Lor." of Variety found the film "covers well-trod territory in dull fashion" and that the film "aims for the upper-case status of a Dario Argento shrieker (particularly via its above-average rock score), it degenerates into perfunctory horror not aided by stiff acting".

Ghosthouse has been described as an imitation of the 1982 American film Poltergeist.

Rifftrax released a video of their "riffing" the movie, allowing people to watch the movie along side humorous commentary.

== See also ==
- La Casa series
- List of Italian films of 1988
