= Jessica Moore =

Jessica Moore may refer to:

- Jessica Moore (actress) (born 1967), Italian actress
- Jessica Moore (basketball) (born 1982), WNBA player for the Indiana Fever
- Jessica Moore (journalist) (born 1982), American journalist
- Jessica Moore (tennis) (born 1990), Australian tennis player
- Jessica Care Moore (born 1971), American poet
- Jessica Robin Moore (born 1992), American comedian known professionally as Jess Hilarious
- Jessica Moore, character in American TV series Supernatural
