= Husbands or Lovers =

Husbands or Lovers may refer to the following films:

- Nju - Eine unverstandene Frau, English title: Husbands or Lovers (1924 film), a German silent film
- alternate title of Honeymoon in Bali, a 1939 American romantic comedy

== See also ==
- Husbands and Lovers, a 1924 film starring Lewis Stone
- Husband and Lovers, a 1991 Italian erotic-drama film
