= Killing Birds =

1988 film by Joe D'Amato and Claudio Lattanzi

- Film poster
- Directed by: Aristide Massaccesi; Claudio Lattanzi
- Produced by: Aristide Massaccesi
- Starring: Daniela Barnes; Robert Vaughn; Timothy W. Watts; Leslie Cummins
- Cinematography: Aristide Massaccesi
- Edited by: Rosanna Landi
- Music by: Carlo Maria Cordio
- Production companies: Filmirage Production Group; Flora Film
- Distributed by: DMV Distribuzione
- Release dates: 3 July 1988 (France); 19 August 1988 (Italy)
- Running time: 91 minutes
- Country: Italy
- Language: English

Killing Birds is a 1988 Italian horror film starring Lara Wendel and Robert Vaughn. The film is set in Louisiana where Fred Brown returns from the Vietnam War to find his wife in bed with her lover and slaughters the whole family sparing the newborn son. After the massacre, he is attacked and blinded by a falcon. Twenty years later a group of students led by Steve and Anne meet Brown, and begin their search for a nearly extinct breed of woodpecker and come across grisly occurrences including boys being killed by vengeful zombies.

The film was first released in July 1988 in France, and in August in Italy.

== Plot ==
Fred Brown, a soldier, returns to Louisiana from the Vietnam War to find his wife in bed with another man and kills them both and his parents, only sparing his son. While he is cleaning his knife, a falcon attacks him and tears out his left eye and blinds him in the other. He ends up at a hospital, where he says goodbye to the child before he is taken into foster care.

Twenty years later, a small group of college seniors, Steve Porter, Mary, Paul, Anne, Rob, Jennifer, and a local cop, Brian, are assigned to locate the ivory-billed woodpecker, a rare species which will be officially extinct by 1992, four years after the current point of the movie. Steven and Anne meet with Fred Brown, who gives them a packet of information on the bird they're searching for. The group makes the former home of Brown their “base” for as long as they're searching, which turns up nothing on their first day other than a rotting corpse in an abandoned truck.

Upon settling in the house, strange occurrences, such as doors closing on their own and Steve seeing things that aren’t there, begin. These become more prevalent as time goes by, including a nightmare where Brown similarly kills Mary to how he killed his wife. While exploring the aviary she discovered earlier, Jennifer is chased into a tool shed by a zombie, only to be beaten to death by another hiding in there. Brian is burnt to death in a freak accident caused by the fuel leaking from the generator. Mary, who suspects it to be the man in her dream who killed Jennifer, finds her corpse.

The survivors make it to the camper only to realize that Brian had the keys. While Rob attempts to hotwire the camper, a zombie attacks and kills Mary. They quickly abandon the camper to make a last stand in Brown's house while Brown suffers a mild heart attack when he realizes what is happening. While trying to fix the generator, a door slams open and blows dust into the room, frightening Rob into running into the generator. His necklace is caught in the generator, and he is strangled to death when the wire cuts into his throat. Paul, who witnessed the whole thing and didn't help Rob, tells Steve and Anne that the zombies killed him.

It is revealed by an email sent by Brown to Rob's computer that Steve is the baby Brown spared twenty years earlier. A zombie breaks into the house and nearly kills Anne. However, Steve saves her at the cost of a shotgun he found. Steve, Paul, and Anne hide in the attic, where a fourth zombie attacks and results in the death of Paul when he panics.

In the morning, the zombies' attacks have ceased, allowing Steve and Anne to escape the house. They meet Brown, and he tells them to get out and that the zombies were never after Steven and Anne, only those of their group that showed fear of them. The credits begin to roll as Steve and Anne look away in despair when they hear Brown's scream emanate from the house. Their fates are not revealed.

== Cast ==
Cast adapted from the book Italian Gothic Horror Films, 1980-1989.

- Lara Wendel as Anne
- Robert Vaughn as Dr. Fredrick Brown
- Timothy W. Watts as Steve Porter
- Leslie Cummins as Mary Brad
- James Villemaire as Paul
- Sal Maggiore Jr. as Brian
- James Sutterfield as Rob
- Lin Gathright as Jennifer
- Brigitte Paillet as Steve's Mother
- Ellis Paillet as Steve's Grandfather
- Nona Paillet as Steve's Grandmother
- John H. Green as Prof. Green

== Production ==
=== Pre-production ===
Claudio Lattanzi grew up dreaming of making films and met Dario Argento and Michele Soavi. Lattanzi assisted Soavi on his documentary film Dario Argento's World of Horror and was an assistant on his film Stage Fright. The producer of Stage Fright, Aristide Massaccesi then offered Lattanzi a chance to direct Killing Birds when Soavi turned down to offer to take up Argento's offer to make The Church.

According to Lattanzi, during the Christmas Holidays of 1986, he had written a story called Il cancello obsoleto about a record producer who invites a rock band to a deserted house to record a tune, without knowing that Nazi soldier corpses are buried there. Lattanzi stated that Massaccesi asked him to reshape the story by replacing the rock band and the Nazis with birds. Lattanzi said the new film would be titled Artigli (lit. 'Talons') which Massaccesi rejected, saying it sounded too much like it would be a documentary about cats.

A screenplay was then written by Daniele Stroppa with English dialogue revised by Sheila Goldberg. Claudio Fragasso and Rossella Drudi maintained conversely that Killing Birds - Raptors was from a story they wrote entitled Artigli. An Italian DVD of the film includes a PDF of the film with a 12-page treatment titled Artigli signed by Lattanzi and Bruna Antonucci, dated January 29, 1987, which Italian film historian Roberto Curti said was "very similar to the finished film" and dismissed Fragasso's and Drudi's claims.

The credited director on the film has been unclear, with many crew members stating that the film was actually directed by the producer Aristide Massaccesi (Joe D'Amato). Massaccesi stated in an interview "It seemed to me that the most sensible thing was to give the job of directing the dialogues to (Soavi's) assistant, Claudio Lattanzi, while I took care of the special effects scenes. In the end, I let (Lattanzi) sign as the director.

=== Filming and direction credit ===
Killing Birds was filmed on location in Thibodaux, Louisiana, with a small crew of eight to nine members. The cinematographer was Massaccesi himself under the name Fred Sloniscko, Jr., one of his many aliases. The film "was shot with sync sound, and no overdubbing".

There is debate about who is the actual director of Killing Birds. Some sources state that Massaccesi directed the film, while Rossella Drudi said that Claudio Lattanzi was a front for the direction, because Aristide could not be credited on too many films as a producer and director. Antonio Bonifacio, the assistant director on Killing Birds said [Massaccesi] offered Bonifacio the chance to direct, and turned it down. Bonifacio continued that then Lattanzi was then only to be credited as the director if a journalist or anyone else was visiting the production. Bonifacio said that [Massaccesi] would actually direct and Lattanzi had agreed to these terms. Bonifacio said Lattanzi would just watch while Massaccesi direct the film and did not take over for him during the production. Scenarist Rossella Drudi said that it was directed by [Massaccesi], not Lattanzi. Massaccesi said he personally took care of shots involving special effects, allowing Lattanzi to sign for the film. In the magazine Nocturno Dossier, an article dedicated to Massaccesi quoted the director without a date saying he was the director of Killing Birds and would have liked to continue his tradition of handing over directing to young directors, but with Lattanzi, there had been no such directorial agreement as he had done previously with Fabrizio Laurenti or Michele Soavi. Lattanzi acknowledged Massaccessi's presence on the set, and said he directed "in symbiosis" with Massaccesi, and that he had specifically chosen certain shots and scenes.

== Release ==
Killing Birds was released in France on 13 July 1988 as L'attaque des morts-vivants and later in Italy on 19 August 1988. Like other Filmirage films, Killing Birds had two versions prepared for it. One for foreign markets with more gore and effects, while the version released in Italy toned down the gore and replacing it with footage of close-ups of birds or actors. It was released under various titles to make it part of other film series on home video, this included the Italian DVD titled Killing Birds–Zombi 5, and in the United Kingdom as Zombie Flesheaters 4.

== Bibliography ==
- Curti, Roberto (2019). Italian Gothic Horror Films, 1980-1989. McFarland. ISBN 978-1476672434.
- Gomarasca, Manlio; Pulice, Davide (2009). "Joe D'Amato. Guida al cinema estremo e dell'orrore". Nocturno. 78 (January) (Dossier).
- Kay, Glenn (2008). Zombie Movies: The Ultimate Guide. Chicago Review Press. ISBN 978-1-55652-770-8.
- Palmerini, Luca M; Mistretta, Gaetano (1996). Spaghetti Nightmares. Fantasma Books. ISBN 0963498274.
