= Caligula... The Untold Story =

- Italian: Caligola... la storia mai raccontata
- Directed by: Joe D'Amato
- Screenplay by: George Eastman; Joe D'Amato
- Produced by: Joe D'Amato
- Starring: David Brandon; Laura Gemser
- Cinematography: Joe D'Amato
- Edited by: Vanio Amici
- Music by: Carlo Maria Cordio
- Production company: Cinema 80
- Release date: 15 December 1982 (Italy)
- Running time: 85 minutes
- Country: Italy
- Language: Italian

Caligula... The Untold Story (original Italian title: Caligola... la storia mai raccontata; transl. "Caligula... the story never told") is a 1982 historical exploitation film starring David Brandon and Laura Gemser. Written by George Eastman and Joe D'Amato, and produced, directed and shot by Joe D'Amato, it was created to cash-in on the success of Tinto Brass's Caligula without being a sequel or remake.

The plot deals with the last days of the deviant and murderous Roman emperor Caligula, his sumptuous feasts, orgies, and the various assassination attempts on his life. At its core, the film develops an ill-fated romance between the emperor and an Egyptian slave seeking revenge for her friend's death.

Caligula... The Untold Story was released in Italy and in other European countries in both theaters and on home video in several different softcore and hardcore versions.

While initially received poorly, retrospective reviews have been relatively positive.

== Plot ==
Roman Emperor Gaius Caesar Caligula, alone in his bed, is plagued by nightmares in which a man, his head covered in a helmet, tries to shoot him with an arrow. The poet Domitius approaches and tries to assassinate him with a dagger, but the attempt is thwarted by Ulmar, Caligula's bodyguard. Domitius ends up losing his tongue and having his tendons cut at Caligula's behest.

Riding along the beach with Messala, Caligula encounters a group of Christians, among whom he spots Livia. He rapes the woman in the woods in front of her young lover Aetius, a consul's son. While being raped, Livia commits suicide with Caligula's dagger. The emperor orders Messala to kill Aetius on the spot. He spreads word that they were killed by fanatical Christians, and persecutes them. The senators, however, do not believe that the peaceful Christians were responsible and continue to plot against Caligula, discussing their options.

In his nightmares, Caligula is visited by the shades of Aetius and Livia. At Livia's funeral, held on a beach, Miriam Celsia, close friend and an Egyptian priestess of the god Anubis, speaks against a Christian burial - the idea being that Livia's God failed to defend her - and in favor of cremation according to Anubis, who speaks of vengeance. The Christians comply.

Lucretius presents sumptuous construction plans to Caligula and a group of senators. To finance the project, Caligula announces he will auction off all his belongings at a banquet with beautiful women and costly admission. He then feigns wine poisoning. One of the senators offers to give his life for his well-being, and Caligula stabs him with his sword. Again in his private rooms, the emperor makes fun of crippled Domitius using his sex slaves.

In a temple, Miriam sacrifices her virginity to Anubis in exchange for vengeance on Livia's murder. She is then approached by senator Cornelius who wants to aid her. Caligula's cavalry capture novice Vestal Virgins as the chief attraction of the banquet. In a swimming pool, they are deflowered by slaves approaching underwater with phalli. Other women, among them Miriam, apply for the orgy and are selected by a eunuch, who then trains them in the art of love. During the banquet (which involves jugglers, a bloody gladiatorial combat and the manual stimulation of a horse), Caligula falls in love with Miriam and his bodyguard Ulmar leads her to the imperial chambers where Miriam and Caligula have sex with each other. When Cornelius attempts to kill Caligula, Miriam unexpectedly saves the emperor's life, killing Cornelius.

Caligula takes deadly revenge on the senators involved in the plot in a number of gruesome ways. In the meantime, Miriam has become passionately tied to Caligula, who announces he will marry her despite her slave status. She discovers Livia's amulet and becomes torn between vengeance and love. When Ulmar offers to help her escape, she refuses. She can no longer kill Caligula but has to know the truth about Livia's death and therefore administers him a hallucinogenic potion. In his ensuing vision, Caligula is approached and plagued in the beyond by the shades of the people he murdered. One is Miriam. As she approaches, he stabs her with a sword he found on the floor, shouting "You're just a dream. But I'm still alive!" When he realizes he is no longer dreaming and has actually stabbed her, he cries.

Riding again on the beach with Messala, Caligula is approached by senators, Praetorian Guards and his uncle Claudius. Caligula announces the cancellation of his project for a new Rome and asks that they tell the gods he has woken from his dream. Ulmar, wearing the helmet from Caligula's initial dream, shoots arrows through Messala's neck and Caligula's heart. Dying, Caligula says, "I'm still alive! Miriam, I'm still...alive."

== Cast ==
- David Brandon as Gaius Caesar Caligula (credited as David Cain Haughton)
- Laura Gemser as Miriam Celsia
- Luciano Bartoli as Messala (credited as Oliver Finch)
- Charles Borromel as Petreius
- Fabiola Toledo as Livia
- Sasha D'Arc as Ulmar, Caligula's bodyguard
- Alex Freyberger as Aetius, the son of consul Tullius Gallus
- Larry Dolgin as Cornelius Varro
- Gabriele Tinti as Marcellus Agrippa
- Bruno Alias as consul Marcus Tullius Gallus (credited as John Alin)
- Ulla Luna as Clitia

Uncredited:

- Michele Soavi as Domitius
- Renato Cecchetto as Galenus
- Mark Shanon as Marius, one of the conspiring senators
- Giuseppe Marrocco / Marrocu as a senator
- Alfonso Giganti as a senator
- Amedeo Salamon as a senator
- Tony Casale as a senator
- Ted Rusoff as a senator
- Angelo Casadei as a senator who takes part in the orgy at the imperial palace
- Cesare Di Vito as one of the senators who decides that Caligula be killed
- Luciano Foti as the man who assists in Agrippa's torture and murder
- Nadine Roussial as Lavinia, a Vestal
- Sabrina Mastrolorenzi as a Vestal
- Olivia Aperio Bella as a Vestal
- Rossella Dramis as a Vestal
- Franca Scagnetti as a persecuted Christian
- Angelo Boscariol, present at the orgy in the imperial palace
- Pauline Teutscher, orgy participant
- Eugenio Gramignano, orgy participant
- Laura Levi, orgy participant
- Spartaco Maggetti, orgy participant

== Production ==
Caligula... The Untold Story was shot in autumn 1981 under the working title Follia del potere (transl. Madness of Power).

== Release ==
=== Censorship ===
The film was presented to the Italian board of censors on March 6, 1982 under the title Caligola... l'altra storia (transl. "Caligula... the other story"), by whom it was rejected the first and second time (March 20 and May 21): It contained too many scenes merging sexual and physical violence with reiterated display of mutilations, the remainder of the runtime being for a large part taken up by orgies so that even cuts could not remove the "negative characteristics" in the eyes of the censors.

On October 19, 1982 the production company "Cinema 80" asked for a revision for a re-edited version under the title Caligola... la storia mai raccontata, passed on December 1, 1982. This version had cut 22 minutes, from the first version, but was lengthened by additional scenes so that it ended up being only about 15 minutes shorter. Nonetheless, a version of the first and longer Italian cut was released in Italy on home video, still bearing the title Caligola... l'altra storia. In 1993, the film lost its Italian rating "vietato ai minori" (transl. "forbidden to minors") after the removal of about 2 and a half more minutes, from the second, shorter version.

In the movie's script the sequence of a detailed crucifixion of a Christian's group was foreseen which, however, was not edited. Probably the sequence was not filmed in order not to risk a blasphemy accusation.

=== Theatrical releases ===
In Italy, the film was first shown in theaters on December 15, 1982. It premiered in Rome on December 24, 1982 and was shown at the Ambasciatori, the Blue Moon and the Moderno. In Milan, it premiered on March 26, 1983 at the Impero and in Turin on June 24, 1983 at the Ambrosio. The film had an 85 minute running time for its theatrical run in Italy.

In the UK, the 1984 theatrical release featured a print that had been extensively pre-cut by the distributors to remove all hardcore and bestiality footage, and then cut by a further 9 minutes by the BBFC to remove scenes of sex and violence. The softcore version was later refused a video certificate in 1987.

In France, the film was released theatrically as Caligula "la véritable histoire" in June 1983. In Spain, a soft-core version was theatrically released as Caligula 3, la historia jamás contada, with 231,236 spectators and a box-office gross of 264,977 euros.

=== Home media ===
Caligula... The Untold Story was released on Italian home video, and on VHS, in its softcore versions by Golfo Azzurro, Videogroup, and Shendene & Moizzi.

Elsewhere, the film was released in a hardcore version never submitted to the Italian board. It includes the following additional scenes:

- A Vestal (Nadine Roussial) performs fellatio on a Greek slave.
- A short scene of apparently unsimulated zoophilia, in which a woman manually stimulates a horse.
- The orgy at the imperial palace, about 9 minutes of footage, some of it hardcore.

The hardcore cut was first distributed on home video by "Movie Time" in the Netherlands on VHS in an abbreviated form, dubbed in English with Dutch subtitles. The onscreen title reads Caligula... The Untold Story, while the title on the cover is Caligula II - The Forbidden Story.

Both the softcore and hardcore cuts were released in Germany in a joint edition as Caligula 2 - The Untold Story (Caligula 2 - Die wahre Geschichte) by the label X-rated in its "Joe D'Amato Collection". A DVD edition with similar content was later released in Italy by Stormovie. The running times vary on home video, with an 80 minute running time for the softcore version, and a 125 minute running time for the hardcore version.

== Reception ==
=== Contemporary reviews ===
Contemporary reviews were negative. In June 1983, A. Valdata observed in La Stampa that despite its title, the film's story was like that of a common comic book, that the protagonist aped Malcolm McDowell in Caligula and that the film was better suited for a red light cinema. In September, an anonymous reviewer at the Segno-cinema noted that the small national production profited from the censorship imposed on Brass' Caligula by devising a costumed soft-core screenplay replete with absurdities and approximations, and that the untold story had better been left untold.

In France, P. Mérigeau thought that apart from some habitually horrific scenes (such as tongues cut off, a prostitute coupling with a horse, a newborn child thrown against a wall), there was an absolute void. He called the screenplay nonexistent, the characters for the most part incomprehensible, and wrote that he would rather not talk about the actors' performances.

=== Retrospective reviews ===
Recent reviews have been comparatively favorable. In his 2003 book on splatter films, Scott Aaron Stine observes that Caligula... The Untold Story "is not as slick as Gore Vidal's Caligula" and says that "the lack of gloss actually benefits the film, putting the subject matter in a very suitable light" and giving more of an impression of a "gritty documentation" compared with the "pretentious and almost glorifying" way in which the earlier film presented its subject matter. Stine also mentions the "gratuitous gore" - in particular the "tongue-sawing sequence" and "the poor chap who gets impaled with a spear in a manner that makes suppositories look positively quaint".

In his D'Amato monograph published in 2004, Gordiano Lupi calls the film "crazy and perverse" as well as "visionary in the right place". He wrote that he preferred it to Brass' Caligula because it is "less chaotic and muddled and, above all, also does not have intellectual pretensions". Furthermore, he praises the film's historical reconstruction and its set design, pointing out the yellow tinge of the cinematography evoking the decadent atmosphere of the late [sic] Roman Empire. In his book on D'Amato published in 2014, Antonio Tentori characterises the film as fragmentary due to censorship, but that it is still apparent that it is dedicated to a bizarre and perverse type of eroticism. Both Lupi and Tentori praise David Brandon's performance as Caligula as "perfect". Generally viewing the acting in a favorable light, Lupi further asserts that Laura Gemser too here delivered one of the most inspired performances of her career. Clive Davies sees her as "the real star". In 2015, Gary Allen Smith notes that the "film lacks a well-known cast but the performances are nevertheless competent. David Cain Haughton, in particular, is quite acceptable as the mad emperor."

== Bibliography ==
- Grattarola, Franco; Napoli, Andrea (2014). Luce Rossa. La nascita e le prime fasi del cinema pornografico in Italia. Roma: Iacobelli Editore. ISBN 9788862522137.
- Tentori, Antonio (2014). Voglia di guardare. L'eros nel cinema di Joe D'Amato. Bloodbuster. ISBN 978-88-908986-1-7.
- Smith, Gary Allen (2009). Epic Films: Casts, Credits and Commentary on More Than 350 Historical Spectacle Movies (2nd ed.). McFarland. ISBN 978-1-4766-0418-3.
- Lupi, Gordiano (2004). Erotismo, orrore e pornografia secondo Joe D'Amato. Mondo Ignoto. ISBN 978-88-89084-49-6.
- Stine, Scott Aaron (2003). The Gorehound's Guide to Splatter Films of the 1980s. Jefferson, North Carolina: McFarland. ISBN 978-0-786-41532-8.
