= Casanova (1987 film) =

1987 made-for-television film directed by Simon Langton

- Genre: Romantic comedy
- Written by: George MacDonald Fraser
- Directed by: Simon Langton
- Starring: Richard Chamberlain; Faye Dunaway; Sylvia Kristel; Ornella Muti; Hanna Schygulla
- Music by: Michel Legrand
- Country of origin: United States
- Original language: English

Production
- Executive producer: Larry Sanitsky
- Producer: Sam Manners
- Cinematography: José Luis Alcaine
- Editor: Bud S. Isaacs
- Running time: 122 minutes
- Production companies: Hessischer Rundfunk; Königsberg/Sanitsky Company

Original release
- Network: ABC
- Release: March 1, 1987

Casanova is a 1987 American biographical romantic comedy television film directed by Simon Langton, written by George MacDonald Fraser, and starring Richard Chamberlain, Faye Dunaway, Sylvia Kristel, Ornella Muti, and Hanna Schygulla. It depicts real life events of Giacomo Casanova. It aired on ABC on March 1, 1987.

The film was released two years before Chamberlain was outed as a gay man.

== Plot ==
Giacomo Casanova has to give up law studies because he sleeps with his teacher's daughters. He tries the priesthood but seduces a young widow. He feuds with an Austrian noble, Razetta, after stealing the latter's mistress.

He is thrown into prison but escapes. He later helps the French king establish a lottery.

== Cast ==
- Richard Chamberlain: Giacomo Casanova
- Faye Dunaway: Madame D'Urfe
- Sylvia Kristel: Maddalena
- Ornella Muti: Henriette
- Hanna Schygulla: Casanova's Mother
- Sophie Ward: Jacqueline
- Frank Finlay: Razetta
- Roy Kinnear: Balbi
- Kenneth Colley: Le Duc
- Richard Griffiths: Cardinal
- Patrick Ryecart
- Jean-Pierre Cassel: Louis XV
- Toby Rolt: Young Giacomo Casanova
- Bruce Purchase: Major Grandi
- Traci Lind: Heidi
- Janis Lee Burns: Louison
- Christopher Benjamin: Massimo
- John Wells: Judge
- Michael Balfour: Jailer
- John Boswell: Prosecutor
- Marina Baker: Lucretia
- Jessica Moore: Angelique (as Gilda Germano)
- Aitana Sánchez-Gijón: Therese
- Fernando Hilbeck: Grimani

== Production ==
The project was announced in May 1985 with Chamberlain attached.

Filming began in October 1986 and went until December. The film was shot in Spain and Italy. There were two versions – one of American television and one for European television, which was longer and contained more nudity.

"We have the classic American and European dichotomy", said Chamberlain. "For the American version the women are covered up, and then when we switch to the European version, blouses come ripping off and there is considerably more flesh."

"I think you have to be very careful about excess in television", said Chamberlain. "There were a lot of seduction scenes. But those are sort of the same the world over through the centuries. Then there were court scenes with people in fantastic court dress and lots of bowing and little comments and asides and fans fluttering. I wasn't particularly aware of being on the edge of a precipice, but I felt that one's concentration had to be very sharp to keep it real."

Chamberlain said he enjoyed playing the role "because he believed in grasping every moment of life and making the most out of it. He wasn't a tremendously high-principled man, but he lived in a time when there weren't a whole lot of highly principled people around. It was a time for fun. It was a time for frolic."

== Reception ==
The film screened on US TV opposite I'll Take Manhattan and The Dirty Dozen: The Next Mission.

The critic from the Chicago Tribune said "broadly and clumsily directed by Simon Langton from a disappointing script by George MacDonald Fraser (there is also a longer, European version with nude sequences), it is consistently stolid and curiously lacking in sensuality--tepid Tom Jones."

The Los Angeles Times said "the film suffers for its identity crisis" and the filmmakers lacked "a clear point of view about their subject" and were "unable to establish a sustaining tone. Chamberlain's scenes with Faye Dunaway... are played as farce, while those with Ornella Muti... are played for pathos. In between are long, tedious passages... Chamberlain exudes his usual charm, but even that is put to poor use... There is little evidence of his seduction skills here. Women fling themselves at him and apparently want nothing more than his sexual favors... [the film] doesn't want to be taken very seriously, but it's too muddled and drawn out to be taken for fun, either."
