= Midnight Killer =

- Italian theatrical release poster by Enzo Sciotti
- Directed by: Lamberto Bava
- Screenplay by: Lamberto Bava; Dardano Sacchetti
- Story by: Dardano Sacchetti
- Produced by: Lamberto Bava; Massimo Manasse; Marco Grillo Spina
- Starring: Paolo Malco; Valeria D'Boichi; Leonardo Treviglio
- Cinematography: Gianlorenzo Battaglia
- Edited by: Lamberto Bava
- Music by: Claudio Simonetti
- Production companies: Dania Film; Reteitalia
- Distributed by: Medusa
- Release date: 1986
- Running time: 88 minutes
- Country: Italy

Midnight Killer (Italian: Morirai a mezzanotte, lit. 'To Die at Midnight') is a 1986 Italian giallo film starring Valeria D'Obici and Leonardo Treviglio, and directed by Lamberto Bava.

== Plot ==
After Nicola Levi sees his wife Sara cheating on him, he gets drunk while waiting for her to return home, then fights her with vulgar insults and tries to kill her. After Sara stabs his shoulder with an ice pick and Nicola storms out, Sara gets into the shower, where she is stabbed to death by a figure in dark clothes with the ice pick in the house. Nicola goes on the run and is the prime suspect. He hides out with his ex-girlfriend, criminal psychologist Anna Berardi, who's on the case with Inspector Piero Terzi.

Inspector Terzi, who's missing his pipe, has a daughter named Carol who studies criminal psychology at college under Professor Berardi, along with her friends Gioia and Monica. One of their subjects is Franco Tribbo, an extremely violent and dangerous serial killer of women known as the "Midnight Ripper" Berardi interviewed, and who is believed to have died in a mental institute fire he's suspected of setting. At some point, the figure sneaks into the university and erases all the records of Tribbo's murders.

With Nicola still on the run, another woman is forced out of her car, chased into an empty stage, and violently killed with the same ice pick by the same figure. As both women's corpses were mutilated before and after they died, akin to Tribbo, Berardi is afraid he's still alive and killing again, especially as she sees him breaking into her house. Inspector Terzi, who tracked and arrested Tribbo, dismisses Berardi, in part due to her being a woman and not on the police force.

Police outside Berardi's house see Nicola and Berardi fighting over a kitchen knife. The detective shoots Nicola dead, much to Berardi's trauma. However, the murders don't stop, as a lingerie store cashier is held at knifepoint and called hideous names by the killer, who now appears to be Tribbo with hideous facial scars from the fire. After Tribbo forces the woman to wear a bra from the store, she tries to run, but Tribbo murders her by suffocating her with several undergarments at the store.

Inspector Terzi sends Carol, Gioia, and Monica away to an led vacation house for their safety, and shortly after that, he finds his pipe again. Taking it as a sign from the killer, he rushes over with Alberto, Carol's classmate and love interest. But for the most part, they're too late, as Tribbo murders Monica, Gioia, and presumably Berardi when she arrives by surprise.

Carol narrowly escapes and runs into Alberto, who says he knows Berardi is the killer. Her thesis says Tribbo raped her when she interviewed him, and she must’ve gone insane from the trauma to the point she started a new killing spree like Tribbo. Carol doesn't believe him, and when she tries to show him the dead women, Tribbo stabs Alberto to incapacitate him before moving to kill Carol. Inspector Terzi shoots the killer dead, revealing "Tribbo" was wearing a mask of the killer's face and was indeed Berardi. Terzi says he realized Berardi was daring him to catch her, giving him back his pipe when he realized the truth. He solemnly remarks the cop who shot Nicola didn't see Anna was the one holding the knife.

== Cast ==
- Valeria D'Obici as Anna Berardi
- Leonardo Treviglio as Nicola Levi
- Paolo Malco as Inspector Piero Terzi
- Lara Wendel as Carol Terzi
- Lea Martino as Gioia
- Eliana Miglio as Monica (credited as Eliana Hoppe)
- Barbara Scoppa as Sara Levi
- Massimiliano Baratta as (credited as Massimo Baratta)
- Loredana Romito as Nurse
- Dino Conti as Terzi's Assistant
- Marcello Modugno as Alberto
- Loredana Guerra as Lingerie Saleslady
- Gianpaolo Saccarola as Theater Watchman
- Peter Pitsch as Franco Tribbo

== Production ==
Midnight Killer was Lamberto Bava's second giallo film and was initially developed as a television film. Midnight Killer was shot in the Italian comune of Ascoli Piceno. Bava later stated he was uneasy making these types of films, stating that "I find doing scenes where women get stabbed to death repugnant. Dario Argento does it so well, but I feel sick as soon as I see the knife in the murderer's hand.".

== Release ==
Midnight Killer was released in 1986. It was released on home video in Denmark as You'll Die at Midnight and in France as Midnight Horror.

== Reception ==
From retrospective reviews, Italian film critic and historian Roberto Curti declared the film as "drab and hardly engrossing, with only sequences set in a hotel standing by the sea standing out." Adrian Luther-Smith in his book Blood & Black Lace found the film to be "hardly a ground-breaking genre entry" while it still had enough style and imagery to make it a must-see for giallo regulars.
