= Con il cuore fermo Sicilia =

- Directed by: Gianfranco Mingozzi
- Release date: 1965
- Country: Italy
- Language: Italian

Con il cuore fermo Sicilia is a 1965 Italian documentary film directed by Gianfranco Mingozzi. The film discusses issues on Sicily.
