= Renato Serio =

Italian composer, conductor and arranger (1947–2024)

- Born: 5 October 1946; Lucca, Italy
- Died: 4 November 2024 (aged 77); Rome, Italy

Renato Serio (5 October 1946 – 4 November 2024) was an Italian composer, conductor, and arranger.

== Life and career ==
Born in Lucca, Serio studied piano, conducting, composition and electronic music. He started his career in the 1960s collaborating with artists such as Shirley Bassey and Nini Rosso.

His collaborations included ones with B.B. King, Dionne Warwick, Tom Jones, Bryan Adams, John Denver, Adriano Celentano, The Corrs, The Manhattan Transfer, Andrea Bocelli, Sarah Brightman, Lucio Dalla, Randy Crawford, Laura Pausini, Miriam Makeba, Riccardo Cocciante, Renato Zero, Anggun, Gianni Morandi, Dee Dee Bridgewater, Gino Vannelli, Antonello Venditti, Angelo Branduardi, Mia Martini, Jennifer Paige, and Amedeo Minghi.

He was the impresario of the Polish singer Anna German. On 27 August 1967 in Italy, on the road between Forlì and Milan, Serio fell asleep at the wheel. They got into a serious car accident. At high speed the car impresario of the singer crashed into a concrete fence. Anna was thrown from the car through the windshield. She suffered multiple fractures, internal injuries. After the incident, Anna German did not regain consciousness for a week, and Serio received fractures of the hand and foot.

Serio composed the music for several musical comedies by Garinei & Giovannini, as well as film scores including Innocence and Desire (1974), The Pumaman (1980), Hit Man (1982), Alone in the Dark (1982), The Third Solution (1988), and The Invisible Ones (1988). He also composed the music of the political anthem of Forza Italia.

Serio died on 4 November 2024, at the age of 78.
