= La Casa (film series) =

Film directed by Sam Raimi

La Casa (lit: The House) is the name given to a collection of mostly unrelated horror films which were retitled and marketed in Italy as one single series. They include movies from both the Evil Dead film series and the House film series.

== Background ==
When first released in 1981, the Sam Raimi-directed horror film The Evil Dead was distributed in Italy under the title La Casa, where it was a box office success. The 1987 sequel Evil Dead II was thus distributed under the similar title La Casa 2, and also did well in the Italian box office.

Attempting to capitalize on the successes of the Evil Dead films, Italian filmmaker Joe D'Amato produced an unofficial sequel titled La Casa 3 (later released in English-speaking countries as Ghosthouse). This in turn was followed by two more "sequels", La Casa 4 (also known as Witchery) and La Casa 5 (also known as Beyond Darkness).

Two additional films were released in Italy under the La Casa series name, both unrelated to either the Evil Dead series or Joe D'Amato's films. House II: The Second Story was released in Italy as La casa di Helen, though it's sometimes referred to as "Le Casa 6", a movie that technically doesn't exist. Despite this, The Horror Show was released as La Casa 7. To add further confusion to the matter, The Horror Show was marketed as a sequel to House II in other non-US markets, using the title House III: The Horror Show, as had been the original intention for the US release during production. The producers had ultimately felt that The Horror Show was too dissimilar in tone to the previous instalments in the House franchise, and resolved to release it simply as The Horror Show in the US market. When The Horror Show was released in DVD in Italy, it was retitled La Casa III, taking the international House III as a reference and making the whole matter even more confusing. House IV was released in Italy as both House IV: Presenze impalpabili rather than La Casa 4 which was already taken, and Chi ha ucciso Roger?. The original House was released in Italy as Chi è sepolto in quella casa?, and was never included as part of the La Casa series.

== Films in the series ==
1. La Casa (a.k.a. The Evil Dead) (1981)
2. La Casa 2 (a.k.a. Evil Dead II) (1987)
3. La Casa 3 (a.k.a. Ghosthouse) (1988)
4. La Casa 4 (a.k.a. Witchery) (1989)
5. La Casa 5 (a.k.a. Beyond Darkness) (1990)
6. La Casa 6 (a.k.a. House II: The Second Story)
7. La Casa 7 (a.k.a. House III: The Horror Show)

== See also ==
- Zombi (film series)
- House (film series)
- Gates of Hell trilogy
