= Little Girl in Blue Velvet =

- Directed by: Alan Bridges
- Written by: Alan Bridges; Christian Watton
- Starring: Michel Piccoli; Claudia Cardinale
- Cinematography: Ousama Rawi
- Edited by: Jacqueline Thiédot
- Music by: Georges Delerue
- Release date: 1978
- Language: English

Little Girl in Blue Velvet (French: La petite fille en velours bleu) is a 1978 French drama film written and directed by Alan Bridges and starring Michel Piccoli, Claudia Cardinale and Lara Wendel.

== Plot ==
In 1940, a Viennese surgeon waits for a passage to England from the Côte d'Azur. In the clinic of a friend who has taken him in he clandestinely performs operations. He falls in love with the girl Laura, the daughter of Francesca who fled Italy with her lover.

== Cast ==
- Michel Piccoli as Conrad Brukner
- Claudia Cardinale as Francesca Modigliani
- Lara Wendel as Laura
- Umberto Orsini as Fabrizio Conti
- Denholm Elliott as Mike
- Marius Goring as Raimondo Casarès
- Alexandra Stewart as Théo Casarès
- Bernard Fresson as Professor Lherbier
- Angharad Rees as Macha
- Christopher Cazenove as "Baby"
- Vernon Dobtcheff as Lamberti
