= The Pumaman =

- Italian one-sheet for The Pumaman
- Directed by: Alberto De Martino
- Screenplay by: Massimo De Rita; Luigi Angelo
- Story by: Alberto De Martino
- Starring: Walter George Alton; Donald Pleasence; Miguel Ángel Fuentes
- Cinematography: Mario Vulpiani
- Edited by: Vincenzo Tomassi
- Music by: Renato Serio
- Production companies: ADM Films Department; DEANTIR
- Release date: 1980 (Italy)
- Running time: 90 minutes
- Country: Italy

The Pumaman (Italian: L'uomo puma) is a 1980 Italian superhero film co-written and directed by Alberto De Martino, starring Walter George Alton as the title character and Donald Pleasence as the villain. It was featured in a 1998 episode of Mystery Science Theater 3000.

== Plot ==
Thousands of years ago, aliens visited the Earth and became gods to the Aztecs. The aliens fathered the Pumaman, a man-god with supernatural powers who would guard the people of Earth. The original Pumaman was entrusted a gold mask with the ability to control people's minds.

In present-day London, Jane Dodson, archaeologist and daughter of the Dutch ambassador, has uncovered the mask and deciphered its instructions: when aimed, it can control their mind. Her employer, the villainous Dr. Kobras, plans to use it to overtake the minds of world leaders, and Jane is his first victim. Kobras, realizing the Pumaman will be after the mask, begins a campaign to discover Pumaman's identity.

American paleontologist Tony Farms survives defenestration by a mysterious Aztec named Vadinho. Some time later, Jane invites Tony to a party at the Dutch embassy, so Kobras' mind slaves can kill him. Later, Vadinho confronts Tony and explains the Pumaman's powers and origins. He claims to a skeptical Tony that his full abilities will develop when he dons a magical golden belt.

Kobras' henchmen try to subdue Tony at the embassy party, but he manages to fight them off and escapes by flying from the roof after donning Pumaman's magic belt. Vadinho explains Kobras' sinister scheme and persuades Tony to follow Kobras to his lair. The henchmen swarm out to shoot down Tony, but he evades them.

Meanwhile, Vadinho, via his mystical amulet, learns Kobras' location. Tony uses an electronic position indicator borrowed from a fireman friend to the villainous lair. Kobras has convened and carried out his plan of absorbing the minds of world leaders. Kobras orders Jane to shoot Tony, but she manages to resist the order due to her affection for him. Kobras fends off Tony's attack with a force field that strips Tony of his powers.

Kobras makes two attempts to control Tony's mind, but Vadinho helps Tony focus on resisting the spell before escaping. Vadinho teaches Tony another superpower, which slows down his metabolism enough to fool Kobras into believing that Tony is dead. Vadinho damages the mind control apparatus by throwing a stick of dynamite. Freed from Kobras' control, Jane smashes a replica of Tony's head, which restores his Pumaman powers. He joins the fight with Vadinho and defeats all of the henchmen. Kobras escapes in a helicopter. Tony catches up to him and, with some deft aerial maneuvering, manages to crash the chopper with Kobras inside.

The world now safe, Vadinho, Tony and Jane head to Stonehenge with the mask. Vadinho summons the aliens with his amulet, and before joining them to return the mask to the Andes, he tells Tony to look for him when it is time to train his future son to succeed him as the next Pumaman. The film ends as Tony and Jane embrace, flying into the air.

== Cast ==
- Walter George Alton as Professor Tony Farms / The Pumaman
- Donald Pleasence as Kobras
- Miguel Ángel Fuentes as Vadinho
- Sydne Rome as Jane Dobson
- Benito Stefanelli as Rankin
- Silvano Tranquilli as Henchman
- Guido Lollobrigida as Henchman

== Production ==
In the late 1970s, in the wake of such blockbuster films as Close Encounters of the Third Kind, Star Wars and Superman, Italian filmmakers began injecting science fiction themes into their films. Director Alberto De Martino stated that The Pumaman "was a production based on the trend of the moment. I had always done it that way and always done well. But regarding this genre of film, there was the audience's diffidence toward Italian movies featuring special effects. They knew we were not up to the task, and didn't take us seriously." Specifically, De Martino noted that Italo Zingarelli had purchased a camera in Germany to create the flying effects, but the technicians were unable to properly use it. To avoid going beyond schedule, these shots were done with a blue screen in just two days.

De Martino was also unhappy with the script and attempted to add humour as an effort to save the film.

== Release ==
The Pumaman was released theatrically in Italy in 1980.

== Reception ==
The director Alberto De Martino declared the film as "the only pic I did wrong in my whole career" and that "When I saw it was a flop, I started asking myself questions. I had made a film I shouldn't have. However it did well abroad and managed to get the guaranteed minimum back, otherwise I'd have had to sell my house. It did not even gross half a billion lire in Italy."

In his book on Italian cinema, Howard Hughes described the film as "one of the worst superhero movies of all", noting an "awful script" and that the film was "amateurish in all departments, but the flying sequences stand out, as becaped Puma Man is suspended, flailing, by the seat of his pants from wires."

=== Mystery Science Theater 3000 ===
The film was featured on Mystery Science Theater 3000, appearing on a season 9 episode that first aired on the Sci-Fi Channel on April 4, 1998. MST3K writer Paul Chaplin noted the real hero of the movie seemed to be Vadinho rather than the Pumaman, "with Vadinho stepping in when something especially difficult or physical needs doing." Perhaps because of this, according to Chaplin, Vadinho seems to have a "palpable condescension" toward Tony.

In an article at Vulture, writer Courtney Enlow lists The Pumaman as one of the series' 25 essential episodes. On the other hand, Paste writer Jim Vorel ranked the episode at #46 out of 191 MST3K episodes from the first twelve seasons. Vogel believes his opinion of the episode is worse than most MST3K fans, as "a few slower sections" lower his ranking. "The flight sequences are side-splitting," Vogel writes, "achieved by use of horrendous looking rear projection while Tony dangles quite clearly in place on a fishing line, butt sticking straight up in the air. These sequences actually manage to look worse than the giant grasshoppers climbing skyscrapers [achieved by filming grasshoppers on postcards of skyscrapers] in The Beginning of the End, which is saying something."

Shout! Factory included the original film and an interview with The Pumaman's star, Walter G. Alton, as bonus features on the Volume XXIX DVD box set. The set, released on March 25, 2014, included the Pumaman MST3K episode and three other episodes: Untamed Youth (episode #112), Hercules and the Captive Women (episode (#412), and The Thing That Couldn't Die (episode #805).
