= Beyond Darkness =

- Directed by: Claudio Fragasso
- Screenplay by: Claudio Fragasso; Sarah Asproon
- Story by: Claudio Fragasso; Sarah Asproon
- Starring: David Brandon; Gene Le Brock; Barbara Bingham
- Cinematography: Larry J. Fraser
- Edited by: Kathleen Stratton
- Music by: Carlo Maria Cordio
- Production company: Filmirage
- Distributed by: Artisti Associati International
- Country: Italy

Beyond Darkness (Italian: La Casa 5) is a 1990 Italian horror film written and directed by Claudio Fragasso.

== Plot ==
A minister and his family move into a new house, without knowing that it was built over the place where twenty witches were burnt at the stake. Soon the terror begins, with the house terrorizing its inhabitants (a la Amityville Horror) with the elements that lie within the construction, for example; a possessed radio and a flying cleaver. The priest's young son is possessed by the demons of Hell, and he enlists the aid of another, more experienced priest to help him perform an exorcism on the boy, in a sequence very similar to that in The Exorcist. The spirit of a female serial killer also inhabits the house, an ugly baldheaded woman who was electrocuted by the state for murdering ten children and ingesting their souls inside herself. The twenty executed witches also reappear in the form of black shrouded ghosts as the exorcism proceeds.

== Cast ==
- David Brandon as George
- Barbara Bingham as Annie
- Gene LeBrock as Peter
- Michael Stephenson as Martin
- Theresa Walker as Carole
- Stephen Brown as Jonathan
- Mary Coulson as Bette

== See also ==
- La Casa series - an Italian rebranding of several otherwise unrelated horror films, including Beyond Darkness.
