= Gostanza da Libbiano =

- Directed by: Paolo Benvenuti
- Written by: Stefano Bacci; Paolo Benvenuti; Mario Cereghino
- Starring: Lucia Poli
- Cinematography: Aldo Di Marcantonio
- Edited by: César Meneghetti
- Release date: 2000
- Language: Italian

Gostanza da Libbiano is a 2000 Italian historical drama film written and directed by Paolo Benvenuti.

It is rigorously based on the original 1594 trial records of the eponymous nun accused of witchcraft in Tuscany. It was entered into the main competition at the 2000 Locarno International Film Festival, in which it won the Special Jury Prize.

== Cast ==
- Lucia Poli as Gostanza da Libbiano
- Valentino Davanzati as Monsignor Tommaso Roffia
- Renzo Cerrato as Father Dionigi da Costacciaro
- Paolo Spaziani as Father Mario Porcacchi da Castiglione
- Lele Biagi as Vincenzo Viviani
- Nadia Capocchini as Lisabetta di Menicone
