= Mimi (1979 film) =

- Directed by: Florestano Vancini
- Starring: Franco Nero
- Cinematography: Alfio Contini
- Edited by: Nino Baragli
- Music by: Riz Ortolani
- Distributed by: Variety Distribution
- Release date: 1979
- Country: Italy
- Language: Italian

Mimi (Italian: Un dramma borghese, lit. 'A bourgeois drama') is a 1979 Italian drama film directed by Florestano Vancini. It is based on the novel with the same title by Guido Morselli and it has as main theme an incestuous love between a father and a daughter.

== Cast ==
- Franco Nero as Guido
- Dalila Di Lazzaro as Therese
- Lara Wendel as Mimmina
- Carlo Bagno as Dr. Vanetti
