= The Sparrow's Fluttering =

- Directed by: Gianfranco Mingozzi
- Written by: Roberto Roversi; Tonino Guerra; Gianfranco Mingozzi
- Starring: Philippe Noiret; Ornella Muti
- Cinematography: Luigi Verga
- Music by: Lucio Dalla; Mauro Malavasi
- Release date: 1988
- Language: Italian

The Sparrow's Fluttering (Italian: Il frullo del passero) is a 1988 Italian romance drama film directed by Gianfranco Mingozzi.

The theme song "Felicità" by Lucio Dalla and Mauro Malavasi won the David di Donatello for best original song.

== Cast ==
- Philippe Noiret as Gabriele Battistini
- Ornella Muti as Silvana
- Nicola Farron as The Young Man
- Chiara Argelli as Gabriele's Wife
- Claudine Auger as Dino's Widow
- Sabrina Ferilli as the woman of the stars
- Beppe Chierici as Parroco

== See also ==
- List of Italian films of 1988
