= Riflessi di luce =

- Italian theatrical release poster
- Directed by: Mario Bianchi
- Written by: Francesco Valitutti
- Produced by: Euro Diamond Film
- Starring: Pamela Prati
- Cinematography: Remo Grisanti
- Edited by: Cesare Bianchini
- Music by: Gianni Sposito
- Distributed by: Deltavideo
- Release date: 16 July 1988
- Running time: 80 minutes
- Country: Italy
- Language: Italian

Riflessi di luce (also known in English-speaking countries as Reflections of Light) is a 1988 Italian erotic film directed by Mario Bianchi and starring Pamela Prati.

== Plot ==
Sick after an accident in which he lost his wife, a musician is angry with the whole world. In a secluded villa where a bisexual, a lesbian, and a spoiled kid live the dramatic and lustful affair plays out.

== Cast ==
- Pamela Prati as Pamela
- Gabriele Tinti as Federico Brandi
- Loredana Romito as Giorgia
- Gabriele Gori as Marcello Prandi
- Jessica Moore as Gaia
- Laura Gemser as Chiara

== See also ==
- List of Italian films of 1988
