= Mary Sellers =

Italian actress (born 1962)

- Born: Wanja Mary Sellers; September 3, 1962 (age 64); Nairobi, Kenya
- Other names: Wanja Sellers, Mary Seller, Marie Sellers
- Occupations: Actress, director, producer
- Years active: 1985–present
- Spouse: Fabrizio Laurenti (m. 1994)
- Children: 3

Wanja Mary Sellers (born September 3, 1962) is an American actress, known for her performances in Italian horror films.

== Biography ==
Wanja Mary Sellers was born on September 3, 1962 in Nairobi, Kenya.

She relocated to Rome, Italy and pursued an acting career. She made her screen debut in Fabrizio Laurenti's short film, The Immigrant (1985), becoming well known in the second half of the 1980s for starring in numerous Italian horror films such as Stage Fright (1987), Ghosthouse (1988) and Demons 5 (1989).

Sellers married Italian director Fabrizio Laurenti, with whom she had worked in the films The Immigrant (1985) and Contamination .7 (1993). Their children, Diego and Rosabell Laurenti Sellers, are also actors.

== Filmography ==
- The Immigrant (1985)
- Stage Fright (1987)
- Man on Fire (1987)
- Eleven Days, Eleven Nights (1987)
- Ghosthouse (1988)
- The Last Temptation of Christ (1988)
- Valentina (1989)
- Arctic Warriors (1989)
- La maschera del demonio (Demons 5) (1989)
- Lambada (1990)
- Testimone oculare (1990)
- Ask for the Moon (1991)
- Cherchez la femme (1993)
- The Crawlers (1993)
- La stanza accanto (1994)
- Voci notturne (1995)
- Olimpo Lupo - Cronista di nera (1995)
- Romeo & Juliet (2013)
