= The Legend of the Christmas Witch =

2018 Italian fantasy film

- Theatrical release poster
- Italian: La Befana vien di notte
- Directed by: Michele Soavi
- Screenplay by: Nicola Guaglianone
- Produced by: Andrea Occhipinti
- Starring: Paola Cortellesi
- Cinematography: Nicola Pecorini
- Edited by: Pietro Morana
- Music by: Andrea Farri
- Production companies: Lucky Red; Morena Films; Rai Cinema
- Distributed by: Universal Pictures
- Release date: 27 December 2018 (Italy)
- Running time: 98 minutes
- Countries: Italy; Spain
- Language: Italian
- Box office: $8,772,289 (domestic) $9,078,213 (worldwide)

The Legend of the Christmas Witch (Italian: La Befana vien di notte, lit. 'The Befana Comes at Night') is a 2018 Italian-language Christmas fantasy comedy film based on the Italian legend of the Befana. It is an Italian-Spanish co-production directed by Michele Soavi.

== Plot ==
During the day Miss Paola works as a schoolteacher in an Italian town, but every night at midnight she transforms into the over 500-year-old Befana, a witch who delivers presents to well-behaved children and unusual surprises to bad ones each year at midnight when it turns January 6. One year a dog chews on the Rolodex she uses to keep track of the children and she fails to deliver a gift in time to a boy named Giovanni Rovasio, who then blames her for all of his subsequent misfortunes, including his parents' divorce.

25 years later, Giovanni has transformed himself into Mr. Johnny, a villain who kidnaps Paola in order to take over delivery of the toys. Riccardo, a student from her class, witnesses the kidnapping. He and five fellow students investigate Paola's storage cellar for clues and discover her secret identity. The children are found by Mr. Johnny's men and put into a trash compactor but Riccardo drops his father's Swiss Army knife in the gears and stops the machine, allowing the children to escape.

Knowing that fire is the only way to harm the Befana, Mr. Johnny ties Paola to a Christmas tree and sets it on fire, using Christmas presents as kindling. Just then the clock strikes midnight and she transforms into the Befana, giving her the power to break free from her bonds and fly away on her broom. Mr. Johnny chases after her on a jet-propelled hoverboard and causes her to crash before trapping her in a bubble in his toy factory.

The children hike to the toy factory but are captured by Mr. Johnny's men. Paola agrees to give Mr. Johnny her treasured letters she has received from children containing their gift wishes and they leave for the mountain where the letters are hidden. Meanwhile, Paola's boyfriend Giacomo arrives at her home to find her missing and discovers her secret identity in her storage cellar. Paola's pet owl guides Giacomo to Mr. Johnny's toy factory, where he rescues the children. Giacomo and the children reach the mountain where the letters are hidden and fight Mr. Johnny but ultimately Mr. Johnny and Paola both topple from a cliff during a struggle.

The next year on January 6, Riccardo finds his Swiss Army knife in his stocking, then notices Paola walking through the town with Giacomo. Mr. Johnny swears vengeance.

== Cast ==
- Paola Cortellesi as Paola / Befana
- Stefano Fresi as Giovanni Rovasio / Mr. Johnny
- Fausto Maria Sciarappa as Giacomo (renamed "Jeff" in the English dubbing)
- Giovanni Calcagno as Igor
- Giuseppe Lo Piccolo as Smilzo
- Luca Avagliano as Gino
- Odette Adado as Emilia
- Jasper Gonzales Cabal as Giuseppe
- Diego Delpiano as Ivan
- Robert Ganea as Leo
- Francesco Mura as Riccardo (renamed "Chris" in the English dubbing)
- Cloe Romagnoli as Sveva

== Production ==
Filming took place in Rome, Aosta, Bolzano, Merano, San Michele all'Adige, and Kastelruth.

== Release ==
The film was released in 502 theaters in Italy on 27 December 2018.

== Reception ==
Reviewer John P. Harvey of BMA Magazine gave the film 4 out of 5 stars, concluding, "this beautifully cinematic take on an ancient Christmas myth will warm the hearts of all children, from seven up to and including anyone’s grandmother."

Cineruopa called the film "a gothic fairy tale for all the family".

Reviewer Becky Tan of Kinicritics gave the film 4 out of 5 stars.

== Awards ==
The film was nominated for a David di Donatello award for Best Visual Effects.

== See also ==
- List of Christmas films
- List of films about witchcraft
