= Jessica Moore (actress) =

Italian actress (born 1967)

- Born: Luciana Ottaviani; August 8, 1967 (age 59); Urbino, Italy
- Other name: Gilda Germano
- Occupation: Film actress
- Years active: 1986-1989
- Notable work: Eleven Days, Eleven Nights (1987)

Jessica Moore (born Luciana Ottaviani on August 8, 1967) is a retired Italian actress who was active from 1986 to 1989, appearing mainly in softcore and horror films. She is best known for her role as the writer and libertine Sarah Asproon in the commercially successful films Eleven Days, Eleven Nights (1987) and Top Model (1988), both produced and directed by Joe D'Amato. Earlier in her career, she also used the name Gilda Germano.

== Early life ==
Moore was born Luciana Ottaviani in Urbino on 8 August 1967 and moved to Pesaro at a young age. Before becoming an actress, she attended a classical liceo and trained as a dancer.

== Career ==
Before and during her film career, she worked as a model, appearing in the Italian Playboy and Playmen, and was one of the “Gin Fizz girls” associated with the Italian erotic magazine and television show Gin Fizz.

From 1986 to 1989, she appeared in about 10 films.

She entered film by chance, introduced by Pamela Prati and her model agency to Joe D'Amato, for whom she debuted in Convent of Sinners (1986) under her birthname, acting in a supporting role as Sister Ursula.

She became best known for her second collaboration with D'Amato, the erotic drama Eleven Days, Eleven Nights (1987), in which she acted as the protagonist Sarah Asproon, a writer and libertine. The film turned its model, Adrian Lyne's 9-1/2 Weeks, on its head by swapping the gender roles and was successful in Italy and internationally.

The following year, Moore returned as Sarah Asproon in the sequel Top Model. Moore remembers that she was jestingly dubbed "la campagnola" ("the country girl") on set since she was ashamed and hesitant before becoming jaunty in the end. She also remembers trusting D'Amato and feeling very much at her ease but also that he made certain "jokes" and "editing tricks" and a number of shots that she did not like.

From the end of 1987 to the beginning of 1988, Moore also appeared on TV as one of the dancing "ragazze coccodé" ("cluck cluck girls") for Renzo Arbore in Indietro tutta!.

After her three films with D'Amato, Moore appeared in several low-budget productions made by Alpha Cinematografica, including the erotic film Riflessi di luce and horror films such as Lucio Fulci's Sodoma's Ghost, Mario Bianchi's The Murder Secret and Enzo Milioni's Escape from Death. In 1989, she also had a role in the second episode of the TV series Classe di ferro.

Moore subsequently retired from the film business. According to D'Amato, her partner did not want her to take erotic roles.

For the Italian DVD release of Eleven Days, Eleven Nights by CG Home Video in 2010, a documentary titled Ultimo Tango a New Orleans was made by Manlio Gomarasca e Davide Pulici in which Moore recounts her experiences on shooting with D'Amato in America.

== Filmography ==
=== Cinema ===
- Convent of Sinners (1986)
- Eleven Days, Eleven Nights (1987)
- Top model (1988)
- Riflessi di luce (1988)
- Non aver paura della zia Marta (1988)
- Sodoma's Ghost (1988)
- Escape from death (1989)
- A Cat in the Brain (1989) (only archive footage)

=== Television ===
- Il Veneziano - Vita e amori di Giacomo Casanova (1986) – TV film (credited as Gilda Germano)
- Indietro tutta! (1987/1988)
- Cheeeese (1988) – TV film
- Classe di ferro (1989) - TV series (credited as Gilda Germano)

== Bibliography ==
- Gomarasca, Manlio (December 1996). "Jessica. L'ultima starlet". Nocturno Cinema. 2: 52–54.
- Gomarasca, Manlio; Pulici, Davide (1999). 99 donne - Stelle e stelline del cinema italiano. Milan: Media Word. pp. 157–162.
- Lupi, Gordiano (2004). Erotismo, orrore e pornografia secondo Joe D'Amato. Mondo Ignoto. ISBN 88-89084-49-9.

Video source:

- Joe D'Amato (director) (July 13, 2010). Eleven Days Eleven Nights (DVD). Italy: CG Home Video S.R.L. Archived from the original on July 17, 2022.
