= Eleven Days, Eleven Nights =

- Italian: Undici giorni, undici notti
- Directed by: Joe D'Amato
- Screenplay by: Rossella Drudi; Claudio Fragasso
- Story by: Rossella Drudi; Claudio Fragasso
- Produced by: Joe D'Amato
- Starring: Jessica Moore; Joshua McDonald; Mary Sellers; Laura Gemser
- Cinematography: Joe D'Amato
- Edited by: Rosanna Landi
- Music by: Piero Montanari
- Production company: Filmirage
- Distributed by: Variety Distribution
- Release date: 1987
- Country: Italy

Eleven Days, Eleven Nights (also spelled 11 Days, 11 Nights; Italian title: Undici giorni, undici notti) is a 1987 Italian softcore erotic drama film produced, directed and lensed by Joe D'Amato and starring Jessica Moore, Joshua McDonald, and Mary Sellers set and shot in New Orleans.

The film was one of D'Amato's biggest financial successes, selling well in countries around the world.

== Plot ==
On a boat ride in New Orleans, Michael, a yuppie working in construction, meets writer and libertine Sarah Asproon. For her publisher, Sarah needs to finish an autobiographical book about her 100 erotic conquests and chooses her chance acquaintance Michael as her last and crowning conquest. However, he is about to marry Helen.

Michael and Sarah strike an erotic pact for 11 days and 11 nights and live through a number sexual adventures with each other. After a while, Helen becomes suspicious and starts following them.

At the end of the time, Sarah has fallen in love with Michael. When she reveals to Michael her initial scheme of using him for her book, however, he takes her forcefully from behind and leaves her for his future wife.

== Cast ==
- Jessica Moore as Sarah Asproon
- Joshua Mc Donald as Michael
- Mary Sellers as Michael's betrothed
- Tom Mojack as Dan
- David Brandon as Peter
- John Morghen as Brett
- Laura Gemser as Sarah's publisher
- Antonio Bonifacio

== Production ==
The film was shot for the most part on location in New Orleans. Some of the interiors were shot in Rome.

== Release ==
In Italy, the film was released on DVD under the title Eleven Days Eleven Nights in CG Entertainment's "cinekult" series; it contains the Italian dubbing in a declaredly uncut version, including Italian subtitles for the deaf or hard-of-hearing.

== Reception ==
Clive Davies called the film a "[p]retty terrible and unerotic 9 1/2 weeks cash-in"; however, he enjoyed it more than its big-budgeted model.

== Bibliography ==
- Lupi, Gordiano (2004). Erotismo, orrore e pornografia secondo Joe D'Amato. Mondo Ignoto. ISBN 88-89084-49-9.
- Paul, Louis (2005). Italian Horror Film Directors. McFarland. ISBN 978-0-7864-8749-3.

Video source:

- Joe D'Amato (director) (July 13, 2010). Eleven Days Eleven Nights (DVD). Italy: CG Home Video S.R.L. Archived from the original on July 17, 2022.
