= Una donna da guardare =

- Italian theatrical release poster by Enzo Sciotti
- Directed by: Michele Quaglieri
- Written by: Riccardo Ghione
- Produced by: Executive Cine TV
- Starring: Pamela Prati
- Cinematography: Remo Grisanti
- Edited by: Mario Bianchi
- Music by: Gianni Sposito
- Distributed by: Lucas Film
- Release date: 24 December 1990
- Running time: 100 minutes
- Country: Italy
- Language: Italian

Una donna da guardare (also known in English-speaking countries as What a Girl and Pamela) is a 1990 Italian erotic film directed by Michele Quaglieri and starring Pamela Prati.

== Plot ==
Gianni is a middle-aged man with sexual problems. His doctor, seeing that medicines are useless, advised him to try to have relationships with several women. Only a beautiful psychologist will be able to solve her problem.

== Cast ==
- Pamela Prati as Pamela
- Mauro Vestri as Gianni Luraghi
- George Ardisson as prof. Mueller
- Elisabetta Focardi as Assistant of prof. Mueller
- Cinzia De Carolis as Marisa
- Sonia Topazio as Adriana

== See also ==
- List of Italian films of 1990
