= The Invisible Ones =

- Directed by: Pasquale Squitieri
- Written by: Pasquale Squitieri; Nanni Balestrini; Italo Moscati
- Story by: Pasquale Squitieri; Sergio Bianchi
- Produced by: Achille Manzotti
- Cinematography: Giuseppe Tinelli
- Edited by: Mauro Bonanni
- Music by: Renato Serio
- Release date: 1988
- Language: Italian

The Invisible Ones (Italian: Gli invisibili) is a 1988 Italian drama film written and directed by Pasquale Squitieri. It is loosely based on the novel Gli invisibili by Nanni Balestrini.

The film was entered into the main competition at the 45th edition of the Venice Film Festival.

== Plot ==
At the beginning of the eighties, Sirio, a young worker of the Terni steelworks with a past in student protesting, decides to abandon his job to join an extreme left-wing group. Although he declares himself contrary to the armed struggle following the decision by some elements of the group to carry out terrorist actions, he is arrested upon being caught with his best friend Apache.

Although there is no real evidence of his guilt, Sirio is promised freedom only if he will talk about the organization and his companions. He refuses, and is subsequently transferred to a maximum security prison where he meets some of his companions (including Apache) and the Professor, a far-left philosopher considered the main inspiration of the movement. Life in the special prison seems to be better than in the penitentiary until, following a revolt led by some extreme leftist militants and sedated by the Special Intervention Group of the police, maximum security is re-established.

These events will lead Sirio to estrange himself more and more from reality, until he finally loses contact with the outside world.

== Cast ==
- Alfredo Rotella as Sirio
- Giulia Fossà as China
- Igor Zalewsky as Apache
- Victor Cavallo as Maurizio
- Paola Rinaldi as Valeriana
- Mauro Festa as The Professor
- Alessandro Zama as Ortica
- Daniela Igliozzi as Sirio's Mother
- Salvatore Billa as Domenico
