= Gianfranco Mingozzi =

Italian film director

- Born: 5 April 1932; Bologna, Italy
- Died: 7 October 2009 (aged 77); Rome, Italy
- Occupations: Director, screenwriter

Gianfranco Mingozzi (5 April 1932 – 7 October 2009) was an Italian director and screenwriter.

== Life and career ==
Born in Bologna, Mingozzi got a degree in Law, then enrolled at the Centro Sperimentale di Cinematografia in Rome, graduating in 1958. After being assistant of Federico Fellini, René Clément, Philippe de Broca and Gianni Franciolini, in 1962 he debuted as a screenwriter for La vita provvisoria, and then made his directorial debut with "La vedova bianca", a segment of the anthology film Le italiane e l'amore. He was also a critically acclaimed documentarist.

== Selected filmography ==
- Con il cuore fermo Sicilia (1965)
- Sardinia Kidnapped (1968)
- Flavia the Heretic (1974)
- Gli ultimi tre giorni (1977)
- Les Exploits d'un jeune Don Juan (1986)
- Il frullo del passero (1988)
