= 45th Venice International Film Festival =

1988 film festival in Italy

- Festival poster
- Location: Venice, Italy
- Founded: 1932
- Awards: Golden Lion: The Legend of the Holy Drinker
- Festival date: 29 August – 9 September 1988
- Website: Website

Venice Film Festival chronology
- 46th 44th

The 45th annual Venice International Film Festival was held from 29 August to 9 September 1988.

Italian filmmaker Sergio Leone was the Jury President of the main competition. The Golden Lion winner was The Legend of the Holy Drinker directed by Ermanno Olmi.

== Jury ==
The following people comprised the 1988 jury:

- Sergio Leone, Italian filmmaker and producer
- María Julia Bertotto, Argentine production and costume designer
- Gilbert de Goldschmidt, French producer
- Klaus Eder, West German film critic
- Hannah Fischer, West German psychologist
- Adoor Gopalakrishnan, Indian filmmaker
- Lena Olin, Swedish actress
- Natalya Ryazantseva, Soviet screenwriter
- Harry Dean Stanton, American actor and musician
- Lina Wertmüller, Italian filmmaker

== Official Sections ==
The following films were selected to be screened:

=== In Competition ===
English title	Original title	Director(s)	Production country
The Black Monk	Чёрный монах	Ivan Dykhovichny	Soviet Union
Burning Secret		Andrew Birkin	United Kingdom
The Camp at Thiaroye	Camp de Thiaroye	Ousmane Sembène	Senegal
Chess King	棋王	Teng Wenji	China
Dear Gorbachev	Caro Gorbaciov	Carlo Lizzani	Italy
Dedé Mamata		Rodolfo Brandão	Brazil
Eldorado	Eldorádó	Géza Bereményi	Hungary
Once More	Encore - Once More	Paul Vecchiali	France
Hard Times	Tempos dificeis	João Botelho	Portugal
Haunted Summer		Ivan Passer	United States
The Invisible Ones	Gli invisibili	Pasquale Squitieri	Italy
Landscape in the Mist	Τοπίο στην ομίχλη	Theo Angelopoulos	Greece
The Legend of the Holy Drinker	La leggenda del santo bevitore	Ermanno Olmi	Italy
Lights and Shadows	Luces y sombras	Jaime Camino	Spain
Madame Sousatzka		John Schlesinger	United Kingdom
The Moderns		Alan Rudolph	United States
Story of Women	Une affaire de femmes	Claude Chabrol	France
Straight for the Heart	À corps perdu	Léa Pool	Canada, Switzerland
Things Change		David Mamet	United States
The Tribulations of Balthazar Kober	Niezwykla podróz Baltazara Kobera	Wojciech Has	Poland
A Very Old Man with Enormous Wings	Un señor muy viejo con unas alas enormes	Fernando Birri	Cuba
Women on the Verge of a Nervous Breakdown	Mujeres al borde de un ataque de nervios	Pedro Almodóvar	Spain

=== Special Events ===
English title	Original title	Director(s)	Production country
Ashik Kerib	აშიკ-ქერიბი	Sergei Parajanov	Soviet Union
The Last Temptation of Christ		Martin Scorsese	United States
A Little Monastery in Tuscany	Un petit monastère en Toscane	Otar Iosseliani	France
The Loves of Casanova (1927)	Casanova	Alexandre Volkoff	France
Mr. North		Danny Huston	United States
Private Access	Codice privato	Francesco Maselli	Italy
A Tale of the Wind	Une histoire de vent	Joris Ivens, Marceline Loridan-Ivens	France
Young Toscanini	Il giovane Toscanini	Franco Zeffirelli	Italy, France
Who Framed Roger Rabbit		Robert Zemeckis	United States

=== Orizzonti ===
English title	Original title	Director(s)	Production country
Appointment in Liverpool	Appuntamento a Liverpool	Marco Tullio Giordana	Italy
Boulevards d'Afrique		Jean Rouch, Tam-Sir Doueb	France
The Children of the Swallow	Τα παιδιά της Χελιδώνας	Costas Vrettakos	Greece
Cream Train	Treno di panna	Andrea De Carlo	Italy
El color escondido		Raúl de la Torre	Argentina
Fiori di zucca		Stefano Pomilia	Italy
The Garden of Desires	Сад желаний	Ali Khamraev	Soviet Union
Iguana		Monte Hellman	Italy, Spain, Switzerland, United States
Komitas		Don Askarian	West Germany
Monologue	Anantaram	Adoor Gopalakrishnan	India
My Dreams, My Love and You	Hayallerim, Askim ve Sen	Atif Yilmaz	Turkey
ZEN - Zona Espansione Nord		Gian Vittorio Baldi	Italy

=== Venezia Notte ===
English title	Original title	Director(s)	Production country
Big		Penny Marshall	United States
Dominick and Eugene		Robert M. Young	United States
A Fish Called Wanda		Charles Crichton	United Kingdom
Good Morning, Vietnam		Barry Levinson	United States
Hitting Home		Robin Spry	Canada
Life Is a Long Quiet River	La vie est un long fleuve tranquille	Étienne Chatiliez	France
Manifesto		Dusan Makavejev	United States
Vampire in Venice	Nosferatu a Venezia	Augusto Caminito	Italy

== Independent Sections ==
=== Venice International Film Critics' Week ===
The following feature films were selected to be screened as In Competition for this section:

English title	Original title	Director(s)	Production country
The Kiss of Judas	Il bacio di Giuda	Paolo Benvenuti	Italy
The Glass Sky	Der gläserne Himmel	Nina Grosse	West Germany
Ghosts... of the Civil Dead		John Hillcoat	Australia
High Hopes		Mike Leigh	United Kingdom
Let's Get Lost		Bruce Weber	United States
Little Vera	Malenkaya Vera	Vasili Pichul	Soviet Union
Mortu Nega	Mortu Nega	Flora Gomes	Guinea-Bissau
Off Season	Nachsaison	Wolfram Paulus	Austria, West Germany

== Official Awards ==
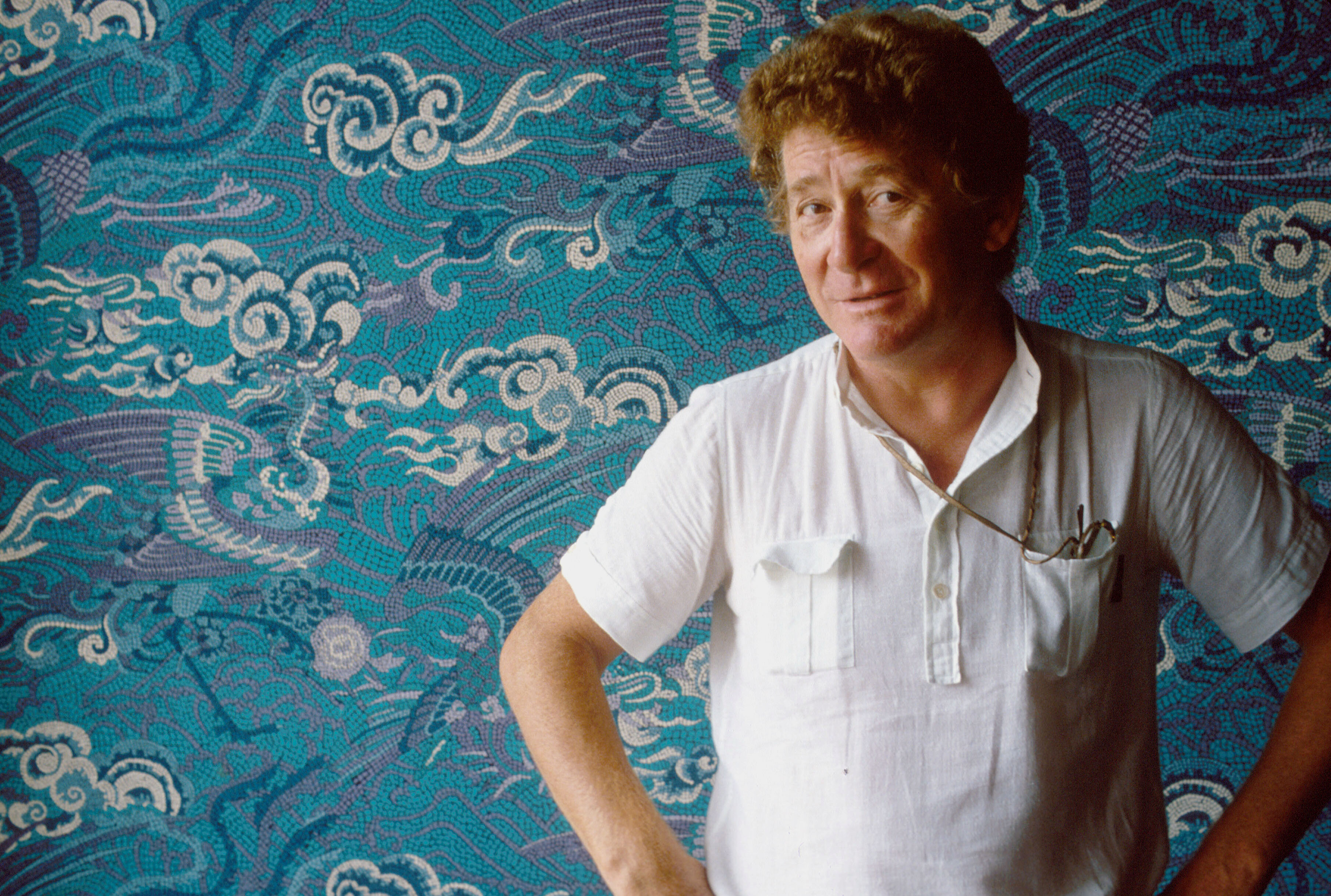
Ermanno Olmi, winner of Golden Lion at 45th Venice International Film Festival

=== Main Competition ===
- Golden Lion: The Legend of the Holy Drinker by Ermanno Olmi
- Grand Special Jury Prize: Camp de Thiaroye by Ousmane Sembene & Thierno Faty Sow
- Silver Lion: Landscape in the Mist by Theodoros Angelopoulos
- Golden Osella:
  - Best Screenplay: Pedro Almodóvar for Women on the Verge of a Nervous Breakdown
  - Best Cinematography: Vadim Yusov for The Black Monk
  - Best Score: José María Vitier, Gianni Nocenzi, Pablo Milanés for A Very Old Man with Enormous Wings
  - Best Art Direction and Costumes: Bernd Lepel for Burning Secret
- Volpi Cup for Best Actor: Joe Mantegna & Don Ameche for Things Change
- Volpi Cup for Best Actress:
  - Shirley MacLaine for Madame Sousatzka
  - Isabelle Huppert for Story of Women
- Volpi Cup Special Mention: David Eberts for Burning Secret

=== Career Golden Lion ===
- Joris Ivens

== The President of the Italian Senate's Gold Medal ==
Caro Gorbaciov by Carlo Lizzani (awarded by the jury)

== Independent Awards ==
=== New Cinema Award ===
- Camp de Thiaroye by Ousmane Sembene & Thierno Faty Sow
- Gli invisibili by Pasquale Squitieri
  - Special Mention: Un petit monastère en Toscane by Otar Ioseliani

=== Prize of the Students of the University 'La Sapienza' ===
- Landscape in the Mist by Theodoros Angelopoulos
- Ghosts... of the Civil Dead by John Hillcoat

=== Golden Ciak ===
- Best Film: Story of Women by Claude Chabrol
- Best Actor: Klaus Maria Brandauer for Burning Secret
- Best Actress: Carmen Maura for Women on the Verge of a Nervous Breakdown

=== Fipresci Critics Prize ===
Shared by Little Vera and High Hopes

=== Italian Critics Prize ===
- Let's Get Lost
