= Husband and Lovers =

- Directed by: Mauro Bolognini
- Written by: Sergio Bazzini
- Produced by: Galliano Juso
- Starring: Julian Sands; Joanna Pacula; Tchéky Karyo
- Cinematography: Giuseppe Lanci
- Edited by: Sergio Montanari
- Music by: Ennio Morricone
- Distributed by: United International Pictures
- Release date: 19 September 1991
- Running time: 94 minutes
- Country: Italy
- Language: English

La villa del venerdì (internationally released as Husband and Lovers) is a 1991 Italian erotic-drama film directed by Mauro Bolognini. The film is a transposition of the eponymous novel written by Alberto Moravia. It is the last film directed by Bolognini.

== Plot Outline ==
A beautiful, strong-willed woman finds herself increasingly drawn to a violent, sadistic lover, rather than her tolerant, understanding husband.

== Cast ==
- Julian Sands as Stefan
- Joanna Pacuła as Alina
- Tchéky Karyo as Paolo
- Lara Wendel as Louisa
- Jeanne Valérie as Mother of Louisa
