= Dario Argento's World of Horror =

- DVD cover
- Directed by: Michele Soavi
- Written by: Michele Soavi
- Starring: Dario Argento; Urbano Barberini; Ken Foree; Romano Albani
- Country: Italy

Dario Argento's World of Horror (Italian: Il Mondo dell'orrore di Dario Argento) is an Italian documentary film that chronicles the career of Italian director Dario Argento.

== Release ==
Dario Argento's World of Horror was released in West Germany on home video in August 1988.

== Reception ==
From contemporary reviews, an anonymous reviewer in Fangoria, who found the film "fascinating but also strangely endearing" noting that the documentary was "a delightful eye-opener, An Americans who want to know what all the fuss is bout this visionary writer-director can get a good start here." Tim Lucas wrote in Fangoria that the documentary was "fascinating" and offered many scenes that were at the time cut from American releases of Argento's films including The Bird with the Crystal Plumage, The Cat o' Nine Tails, Four Flies on Grey Velvet, Tenebrae and Suspiria. Lucas also proclaimed that the films "real accomplishment is its portrait of Argento's professional intensity and dedication; he clearly deserves to be taken more seriously by American film audiences, critics, and distributors."
