= The Kiss of Judas (film) =

- Film poster
- Directed by: Paolo Benvenuti
- Written by: Paolo Benvenuti
- Starring: Carlo Bachi; Giorgio Algranti; Emidio Simini; Marina Bersotti; Pio Gianelli
- Cinematography: Carlo Di Marcantonio
- Edited by: Mario Benvenuti
- Music by: Stefano Bambini; Andrea Di Sacco
- Release date: 1988
- Country: Italy
- Language: Italian

The Kiss of Judas (Italian: Il bacio di Giuda) is a 1988 Italian religious drama film written, directed and produced by Paolo Benvenuti, at his feature film debut. It was screened at the 45th Venice International Film Festival in the Critics' Week section.

== Cast ==
- Carlo Bachi as The Nazarene
- Giorgio Algranti as Judas
- Emidio Simini as Nicodemus
- Marina Bersotti as The Magdalen
- Pio Gianelli as Simon Peter
