= Dear Gorbachev =

- Theatrical release poster
- Directed by: Carlo Lizzani
- Starring: Harvey Keitel; Flaminia Lizzani
- Music by: Luis Enriquez Bacalov
- Production companies: R.P.A. International; RAI TV 2
- Distributed by: United International Pictures
- Release date: 1988
- Running time: 81 minutes
- Languages: Italian; English

Caro Gorbaciov (internationally released as Dear Gorbachev) is a 1988 Italian drama film directed by Carlo Lizzani. It entered the main competition at the 45th Venice International Film Festival and was the official opening film of the festival. It won the President of the Italian Senate's gold medal.

== Cast ==
- Harvey Keitel: Nikolai Bukharin
- Flaminia Lizzani: Anna Michailovna Larina Bucharina
- Gianluca Favilla: Yuri Larin
