= Adelmo =

Adelmo is a masculine Spanish and Italian given name. People named Adelmo include:

- Adelmo Bulgarelli (born 1932), Italian wrestler
- Adelmo Paris (born 1954), Italian footballer
- Adelmo Prenna (1930–2008), Italian footballer
