= Lara Wendel =

German-Italian actress (born 1965)

- Born: Daniela Rachele Barnes; 29 March 1965 (age 61); Munich, Bavaria, West Germany
- Occupation: Actress
- Years active: 1972–1993
- Father: Walt Barnes
- Website: www.larawendel.com

Lara Wendel (born Daniela Rachele Barnes; 29 March 1965) is a retired German-Italian actress, active in film and television between 1972 and 1993. Her father was American football player and actor Walt Barnes.

== Life and career ==
Wendel is the daughter of German actress Britta Wendel and of the American football player and film actor Walt Barnes. She made her debut at just four years old as a model for ads, and at the age of seven, she made her film debut in Tonino Valerii's giallo film My Dear Killer (1972). She also appeared as Mario Adorf's daughter Rita in Manhunt (1972), directed by Fernando Di Leo, and as the young Silvia in The Perfume of the Lady in Black (1974), directed by Francesco Barilli.

Wendel had her first main role at 12 years old in the controversial erotic drama Maladolescenza (1977), which involved both nudity and simulated sex among preadolescents. Later she appeared in other controversial films, characterized by plots involving incest and improper relations between adults and adolescents, such as Little Girl in Blue Velvet, Mimi (1979), and Desideria: la vita interiore (1980).

In the 1980s Wendel was mainly active in horror films, working with Dario Argento (Tenebrae, 1982), Lamberto Bava (Midnight Killer, 1986), Joe D'Amato (Killing Birds, 1988), and Umberto Lenzi (Ghosthouse, 1988) among others. She was also in a number of art films, including Michelangelo Antonioni's Identification of a Woman (1982) and Federico Fellini's Intervista (1987). She also appeared on television, notably playing a starring role in the second season of the TV-series La piovra. Her last film was Mauro Bolognini's erotic drama Husband and Lovers (1991), and she retired at just 26 years old.

== Filmography ==
Year	Title	Role	Notes
1972	My Dear Killer	Stefania Moroni	
1972	The Italian Connection (Manhunt)	Rita Canali	Uncredited
1972	The Assassin of Rome	Bambina tedesca	Uncredited
1973	Redneck	German Girl	
1974	The Perfume of the Lady in Black	Young Silvia	
1977	Maladolescenza	Laura	
1978	Little Girl in Blue Velvet	Laura / Francesca's daughter	
1979	Ernesto	Ilio / Rachele	(US: Emilio / Rachel)
1979	Mimi	Mimmina	
1979	Satan's Wife	Daria Rhodes	
1980	Desideria: la vita interiore	Desideria II	
1981	The Hawk and the Dove	Viva Montero	
1982	Identification of a Woman	Girl in swimming pool	
1982	Tenebrae	Maria Alboretto	
1983	Vai alla grande	Karen	
1985	Fatto su misura	Lisa	
1985	A me mi piace	Michela	
1986	Midnight Killer	Carol Terzi	
1987	Intervista	Bride	
1985	Un'australiana a Roma	Susan	
1988	Killing Birds	Anne	
1988	Ghosthouse	Martha	
1989	The Red Monks	Ramona Icardi	
1991	La villa del venerdì (Husband and Lovers)	Louisa	
