= Paolo Benvenuti =

Italian screenwriter, film producer and film director

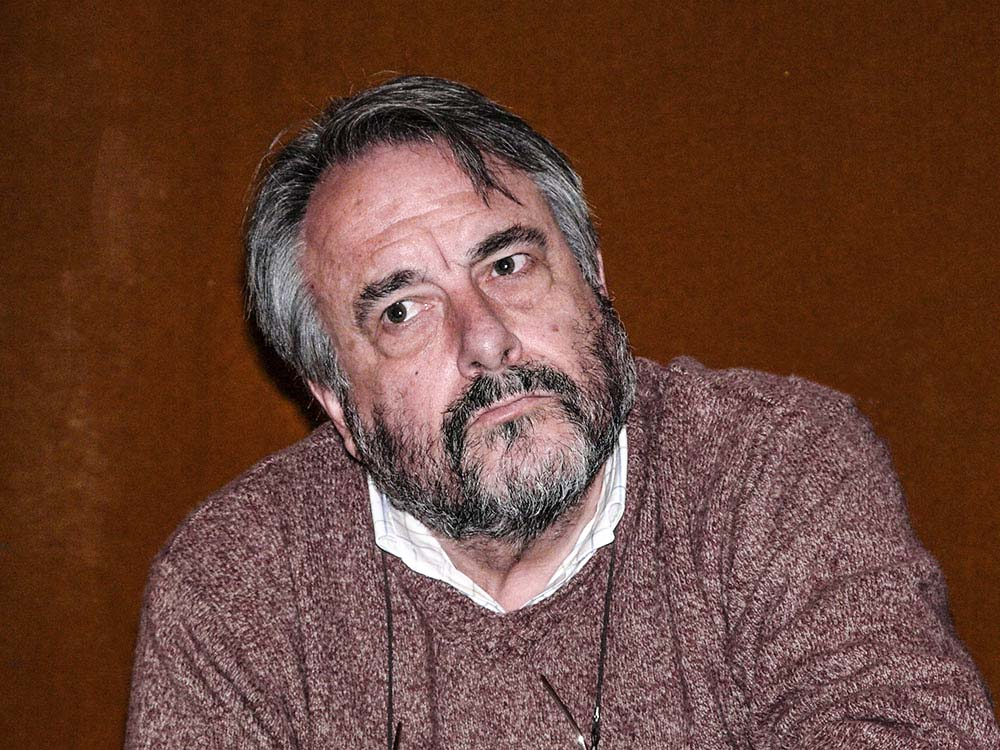
- Born: 30 January 1946 (age 80); Pisa, Italy
- Occupations: Director, screenwriter and producer

Paolo Benvenuti (born 30 January 1946) is an Italian film director, screenwriter and producer.

== Life and career ==
Born in Pisa, before being interested in cinema Benvenuti was active as a painter and a graphic artist. In the late 1960s he started filming shorts, documentaries and experimental films. He made his feature film debut in 1988, with The Kiss of Judas, which he also produced and which was screened at the 45th Venice International Film Festival in the Critics' Week section. His cinema is generally characterized by a rigorous and sophisticated style, influenced by paintings and by classical drama theatre. His black-and-white historical drama film Gostanza da Libbiano won the Special Jury Prize at the 2000 Locarno International Film Festival.

== Filmography ==
- The Kiss of Judas (1988)
- Confortorio (1992)
- Tiburzi (1996)
- Gostanza da Libbiano (2000)
- Secret File (2003)
- Puccini and the Girl (2008)
