= Evil Clutch =

- VHS cover
- Directed by: Andrea Marfori
- Screenplay by: Andrea Marfori
- Story by: Andrea Marfori
- Produced by: Agnese Fontana
- Starring: Coralina Cataldi Tassoni; Diego Ribon
- Cinematography: Marco Isoli
- Edited by: Fabrizio Polverari; Andrea Marfori
- Music by: Adriano Maria Vitalari
- Production company: Fomar Film
- Release date: 26 March 1988 (Brussels International Festival of Fantasy Films)
- Running time: 85 minutes
- Country: Italy

Evil Clutch (Italian: Il Bosco 1) is a 1988 Italian horror film written and directed by Andrea Marfori. The film is about an American college student who joins her Italian boyfriend for a romantic weekend trip. Along the way, they pick up a voluptuous female hitch-hiker who turns out to be a maniacal demon with a ferocious, deadly claw-like hand. The film was shown at the Brussels International Festival of Fantasy Films and in Rome at Fantafestival in 1988. It was not distributed theatrically in Italy or the United States, where it was distributed by Eagle Home Video and Troma respectively.

== Production ==
Director Andrea Marfori was a film buff at an early age and would begin working in documentary and short films in the early 1980s. In April 1987, Marfori began work on a horror short film which the director described as a pre-film for his first feature Evil Clutch. The film was made with an approximate 100 million lire budget with a crew of 20 people and a cast of five. To complete the film, Marfori included footage from his short film Gory Sand.

The film was titled Il bosco 1, with the number one being added as an ironic nod towards the amount of horror film sequels in theatres at the time.

== Release ==
Evil Clutch was shown at the Brussels International Festival of Fantasy Films on March 26, 1988. It was later shown in Rome's Fantafestival on June 7.

The film was not released theatrically and released on home video in Italy by Eagle Home Video. It was released in the United States on home video on June 4, 1992 by Troma.

== Reception ==
From contemporary reviews, Gorezone writers Philip Nutman and Mario Cortini found that the film "has some continuity problems. But when have the Italians ever worried about that?"
