= David Brandon (actor) =

Irish actor (born 1951)

- Born: David Cain Haughton; 13 December 1951 (age 74); Cork, Ireland
- Occupation: Actor
- Years active: 1978–present

David Cain Haughton (born 13 December 1951), known professionally as David Brandon (although originally credited as David Haughton), is an Irish actor who has mostly appeared in Italian films. He has appeared in more than sixty films since 1978, including the title role in Joe D'Amato's controversial Caligula... The Untold Story (1982). Before working in film, he was a member of Lindsay Kemp's theatre company, where his roles included Jokanaan in Kemp's all-male production of Salomé (1975). He lives in Rome.

== Selected filmography ==
Year	Title	Role	Notes
1978	Jubilee	Ariel	
1982	Caligula... The Untold Story	Caligula	
1984	Sole nudo	Luca Adami	
1984	Ator 2 - L'invincibile Orion	Zor	
1985	A.D. (miniseries)	Petronius	
1987	Delirium	Roberto	
1987	Stage Fright	Peter	
1987	Good Morning, Babylon	Mr. Grass	
1987	Until Death	Carlo	
1987	Eleven Days, Eleven Nights	Brett	
1987	Italian Postcards	Vittorio	
1989	Casablanca Express	Jason Lloyd	
1992	Mean Tricks	Jimmy Gandelman	
2012	Diaz – Don't Clean Up This Blood	Padre Inga	
2013	Neverlake	Dr. Brook	
2018	Remember?	Father	
