= The Crawlers (film) =

- Promotional release poster
- Directed by: Fabrizio Laurenti; Joe D'Amato (uncredited)
- Written by: Fabrizio Laurenti; Albert Lawrence; Daniele Stroppa
- Produced by: Joe D'Amato
- Starring: Mary Sellers; Jason Saucier; Bubba Reeves; Chelsi Stahr; Vince O'Neil
- Cinematography: Larry Revene
- Music by: Carlo Maria Cordio
- Production company: Filmirage
- Distributed by: Epic Productions; Columbia/Tri-Star Home Video
- Release date: 18 October 1991 (Italy)
- Running time: 91 minutes
- Country: Italy
- Language: English

The Crawlers (also known as Troll 3, Creepers or Contamination .7) is a 1991 Italian horror film directed by Fabrizio Laurenti under the pseudonym Martin Newlin. Some parts of the film were also directed by producer Joe D'Amato, uncredited.

== Plot ==
After a small town nuclear power plant dumps hazardous waste into a forest surrounding the town, people begin dying in increasingly gruesome ways. No one can pinpoint the source of the deaths until the EPA investigates; the forests' roots were mutated due to the waste, causing them to kill and eat people. The plants attempt to break loose, but the EPA bulldozes the plants, killing them, but leaving the possibility that some plants may have survived.

== Cast ==
- Mary Sellers as Josie
- Jason Saucier as Matt
- Bubba Reeves as Taylor
- Chelsi Stahr as Susan
- Vince O' Neil as Sheriff

== Production ==
=== Filming ===
Filming began at summer in 1990 and wrapped in summer 1991. The film was mostly filmed in Porterville, Utah, where Troll 2 was also filmed.

== Title clarification ==
The Crawlers is also known by the titles Troll 3, Creepers and Contamination .7. Despite the Troll 3 title, the film has no narrative connections to Troll or Troll 2, the latter of which itself has no narrative connections to Troll. The Crawlers does not feature trolls, and does not share any cast members with either Troll film. It is also unconnected to the Italian science fiction horror film Contamination.

D'Amato's fantasy film Quest for the Mighty Sword was released as Troll 3 in Germany, so these two films have been confused in some reference sources.

== Release ==
Originally slated for theatrical release in the United States in 1992, the film ended up instead as a direct-to-video release (as The Crawlers) in 1993 by Columbia TriStar Home Entertainment.

=== Home media ===
Scream Factory (under license from MGM Home Entertainment) released the film on DVD for the first time under the title Contamination .7, along with The Dungeonmaster, Catacombs and Cellar Dweller, in a 4 Horror Movie marathon collection on October 29, 2013.

The film received a Blu-ray release by Scream Factory, again under the title Contamination .7 in April 2017.

== See also ==
- List of Italian films of 1990
