= Stage Fright (1987 film) =

1987 Italian slasher film directed by Michael Soavi

- Italian theatrical release poster
- Directed by: Michele Soavi
- Written by: Lew Cooper; Sheila Goldberg
- Produced by: Aristide Massacessi; Donatella Donati
- Starring: David Brandon; Barbara Cupisti; Mary Sellers; Giovanni Lombardo Radice; Jo Ann Smith; Robert Gligorov; Piero Vida
- Cinematography: Renato Tafuri
- Edited by: Kathleen Stratton
- Music by: Simon Boswell; Guido Anelli; Stefano Mainetti
- Production companies: DMV Distribuzione; Filmirage
- Distributed by: Artists Entertainment Group
- Release date: 1987
- Running time: 86 minutes
- Country: Italy

Stage Fright (Italian: Deliria) is a 1987 Italian slasher film directed by Michele Soavi, and starring Barbara Cupisti, David Brandon, and Giovanni Lombardo Radice. The plot involves a group of stage actors and crew who lock themselves inside a theater for rehearsal of a musical production, unaware that an escaped mental patient is locked inside with them.

The film was an inspiration for the Kannada-language film Idu Saadhya (1989).

== Plot ==
Late at night, a theatre troupe rehearses a musical about the fictional mass murderer Night Owl. Domineering director Peter refuses to let anyone leave. When actress Alicia sprains her ankle, she and castmate Betty sneak out for medical help at a nearby mental hospital. There, Alicia notices Irving Wallace, a former actor driven insane who previously went on a killing spree. While Alicia receives treatment, Wallace murders an attendant with a syringe and escapes to hide in the trunk of Betty’s car.

Back at the theatre, Peter fires Alicia for leaving. Outside, Wallace kills Betty with a pickaxe to the mouth. Alicia finds the body and alerts the police, who station officers outside. Peter seizes the tragedy to rewrite the play with Wallace as the villain and demands the troupe stay to rehearse. Corinne secretly hides the theatre’s exit key on Peter's instructions.

Wallace dons the owl costume intended for the play and begins stalking the cast. Mistaken identities and confusion lead to multiple deaths: Corinne is strangled and stabbed, Ferrari is stabbed and hung, and Mark is killed when Wallace drills through a door. Peter and Danny witness Mark’s death and stick together. Onstage, Peter spots the killer on the catwalks but accidentally axes Brett, who is bound in the spare owl costume. Wallace then kills Sybil and Danny, injures Laurel and attacks Peter, severing his arm with a chainsaw before decapitating him with an axe.

Alicia regains consciousness to find a wounded Laurel hiding in the showers, but Wallace soon finishes her off. Alone, Alicia searches for the missing key, discovering Wallace has arranged the troupe’s bodies around the stage, feathered like part of the set. She retrieves the key and fends him off with a fire extinguisher before escaping to the catwalks. After a final struggle involving fire, she manages to flee the theatre and report to the police.

The next morning, Alicia returns for her watch. Security guard Willy notices the loaded gun she had found the night before and remarks he would have shot Wallace between the eyes. Newspapers report eight victims, but Wallace should be the ninth. Suddenly, a scarred Wallace lunges at Alicia, only to be shot in the head by Willy. Shaken, Alicia leaves the theatre, while Wallace smirks at the camera, implying he has survived.

== Cast ==
- Barbara Cupisti as Alicia
- David Brandon as Peter
- Mary Sellers as Laurel
- Robert Gligorov as Danny
- Jo Ann Smith as Sybil
- Giovanni Lombardo Radice as Brett
- Martin Philips as Mark
- Piero Vida as Ferrari
- Loredana Parrella as Corinne
- Ulrike Schwerk as Betty
- Domenico Fiore as Police Chief
- Mickey Knox as Old Cop
- Michele Soavi as Young Cop
- James Sampson as Willy (credited as James E. R. Sampson)
- Clain Parker as Irving Wallace

== Production ==
The film marks the directorial debut of Dario Argento protégé Michele Soavi and was produced by Joe D'Amato.

Soavi stated that on Stage Fright he "didn't feel ready to direct, but of course I said yes when I was offered a chance." Soavi also blamed the film’s poor success due to post-production issues. “I was rather unsatisfied with the Italian version, in which less care was taken over the editing, the dialogue and the [dubbing]”. Soavi also noted that the music was changed for the Italian release and that overall domestic distribution of the film was poor.

== Release ==
Stage Fright was released in 1987. Outside of Italy, the film went under many names, including Bloody Bird, Aquarius, and Sound Stage Massacre.

Before its release in Australia as StageFright, several violent scenes were cut to not be banned. As well, the 1986 UK Avatar release via VHS was altered, with 11 seconds cut before BBFC submission. Releases via the Redemption and Vipco labels were left uncut.

=== Critical response ===
AllMovie awarded the film three out of five stars, writing: "Stage Fright is primarily for the horror audience but they are likely to enjoy its visually inventive approach to the usually humdrum slasher subgenre", calling the film "a good example of how style can triumph over substance in a genre effort" and praising Soavi's direction.

On the review aggregator website Rotten Tomatoes, 91% of 11 critics' reviews are positive, with an average rating of 7.5/10. No critical consensus is provided.
