= Pamela Prati =

Italian actress, showgirl, model, singer and television hostess

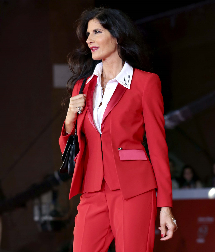
- Prati at the Festa del Cinema di Roma 2015
- Born: Paola Pireddu; 26 November 1958 (age 67); Ozieri, Sassari, Italy
- Other name: Pamela Field
- Occupations: Television personality; actress; model

Pamela Prati (born Paola Sassaroli, 26 November 1958) is an Italian television personality, actress, and former model. She has appeared in many television variety shows and in erotic comedies. She has hosted several programmes for Mediaset's Canale 5, including Scherzi a Parte and La sai l'ultima?. She is also credited as Pamela Field in some of her pictures.

== Career ==
Little is known about Prati's early life. She maintains that she was born from a Spanish flamenco dancer that later abandoned her Italian mother in Ozieri in the province of Sassari, northern Sardinia; however the Italian tabloid Chi has alleged that her father was in fact an Italian womanizer known as "Piscittu Murtu" (dead fish).

She moved to Rome in her late teens where she worked as a model and made a brief appearance on television in the variety show La Sberla in 1976. Prati attracted much publicity when she appeared on the cover of singer Adriano Celentano's album Un po' artista un po' no in 1980. That same year she debuted in her first film, La moglie in bianco... L'amante al pepe, an erotic comedy in which she had the starring role. This was followed by other films, and in the meanwhile Prati began to study dance, singing and diction. She soon joined the Bagaglino Company, which was directed by Pier Francesco Pingitore and produced variety shows; Prati began making regular appearances on television as a showgirl and hostess, while she continued to act in films and television fiction. She has also performed on stage in theatrical productions.

Prati participated in three beauty contests in 1983, which included Mora più bella d'Italia, Miss Sardinia and Miss Universe.

In 1996, she released an album entitled Il tango delle 11. She also collaborated with Sandro Giacobbe on a single, "Mi innamoro di te" in 1999, and eight years later, in 2007, she released her most recent single, "Papelon".

In 1992, Prati hosted the Canale 5 variety programme Scherzi a Parte, and from 1992 to 1994, she presented La sai l'ultima?. She has also appeared on reality shows such as L'Isola dei Famosi 6 in 2008, which is the Italian version of Celebrity Survivor: Vanuatu, and Grande Fratello VIP in 2016. In both reality shows she walked away before finishing the planned television schedule.

== Filmography ==
=== Films ===
Year	Title	Role	Notes
1981	La moglie in bianco... l'amante al pepe	Sonia	Feature film debut
1982	Monsignor	Roman girl	Cameo appearance
1982	Mora	Night club girl	Uncredited
1983	Ironmaster	Lith	Credited as Pamela Field
1984	Carmen nue	Carmen	
1985	The Adventures of Hercules	Arachne	
1985	È arrivato mio fratello	Mrs. Piranesi	
1985	Miseramente folle	Clarissa	
1988	Man spricht deutsh	Violetta	
1988	Cheeeese	Loredana	
1988	Riflessi di luce	Marta	
1988	Transformations	Women Succubs	
1989	Io Gilda	Gilda	
1989	Sukkubus	Sukkubus	
1990	Una donna da guardare	Pamela	
1992	Gole ruggenti	Aida Spada	

=== Television ===
Year	Title	Role	Notes
1983–1984	Il cappello sulle ventitré	Herself - Dancer	Variety show (season 1)
1985	Embassy	Rita	Television movie
1986	Le volpi della notte	Miriam Pieraccini	Television movie
1987	Provare per credere	Silvia	Television movie
1989	Tutti in palestra	Ingrid	Miniseries
1989	Luna di sangue	Dr. Mirella Alfonsi	Television movie
1989	Gioco di società	Elisa	Television movie
1991	I tre moschettieri	Costanza	Television film
1993–1994	Scherzi a parte	Herself - Guest	Prank program
1995	Re per una notte	Herself - Co-host	Variety show
1997	Quei due sopra il varano	Herself	Episode: "Arriva la madama"
2003	La palestra	Ljuba Bonetti	Television film
2004	Il ristorante	Herself - Contestant	Reality show (season 1)
2005–2006	Amici di Maria De Filippi	Herself - Teacher	Talent show (season 6)
2007	Di che peccato sei?	Margherita	Television film
2008	L'Isola dei Famosi	Herself - Regular guest	Reality show (season 6)
2009	Piloti	Pamela	Guest role (season 3)
2009	Non smettere di sognare	Luisa Contini	Television film
2011	Non smettere di sognare	Delia	Recurring role; 5 episodes
2011	L'amore non basta	Patty Di Maio	Miniseries
2016	Grande Fratello VIP	Herself - Contestant	Reality show (season 1)
2022	Grande Fratello VIP	Herself - Contestant	Reality show (season 7)

== Theatre ==
- Beautiful Thing (2007)

== Discography ==
- Il Tango delle 11 (1996, album CD)
- "Mi innamoro di te" (1999, with Sandro Giacobbo, single)
- "Papelon" (2007, single)
