= Michele Soavi =

Italian filmmaker, actor, and screenwriter

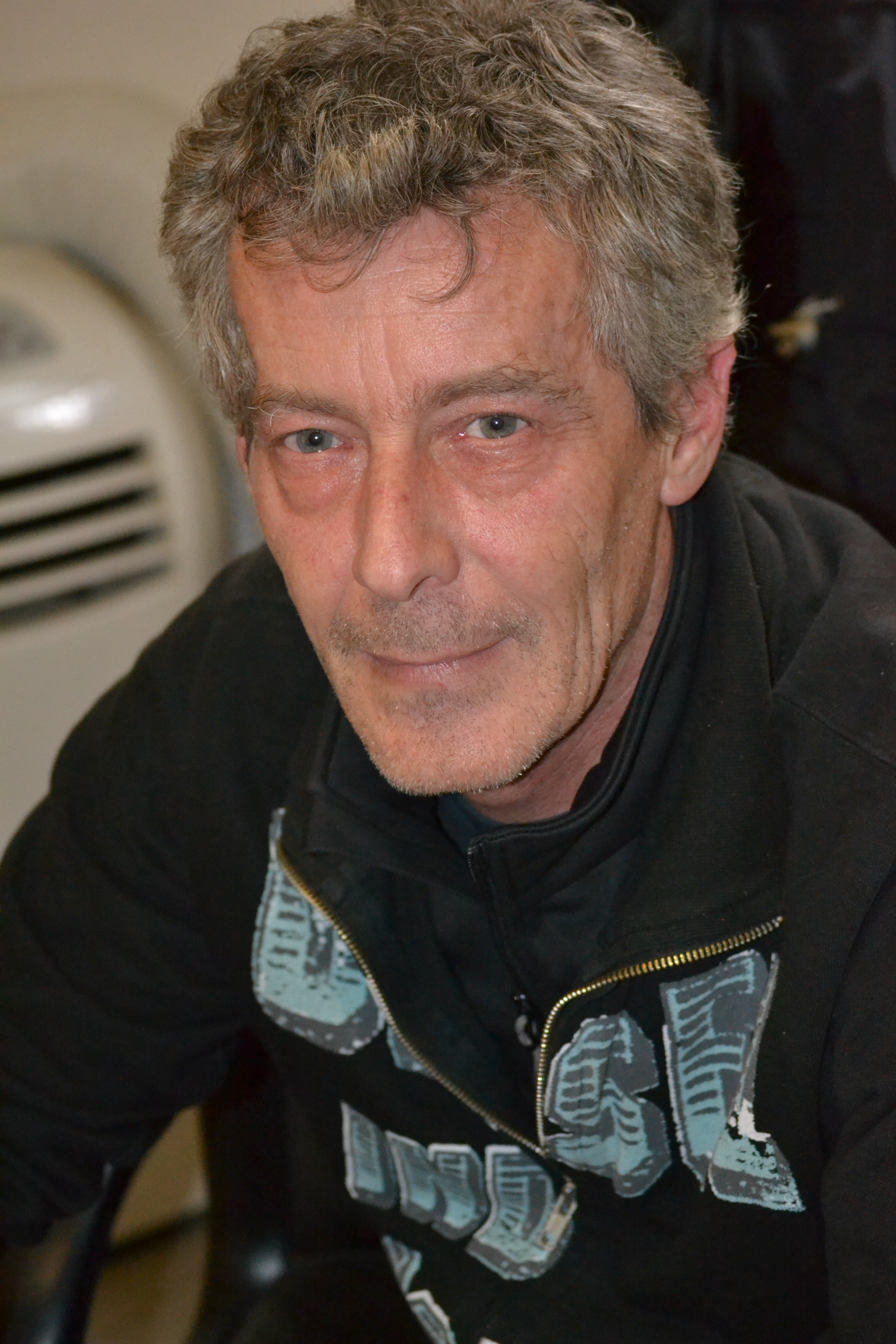
- Michele Soavi in 2011
- Born: 3 July 1957 (age 69); Milan, Italy
- Occupations: Director; screenwriter; actor
- Years active: 1978–present
- Family: Adriano Olivetti (grandfather)

Signature
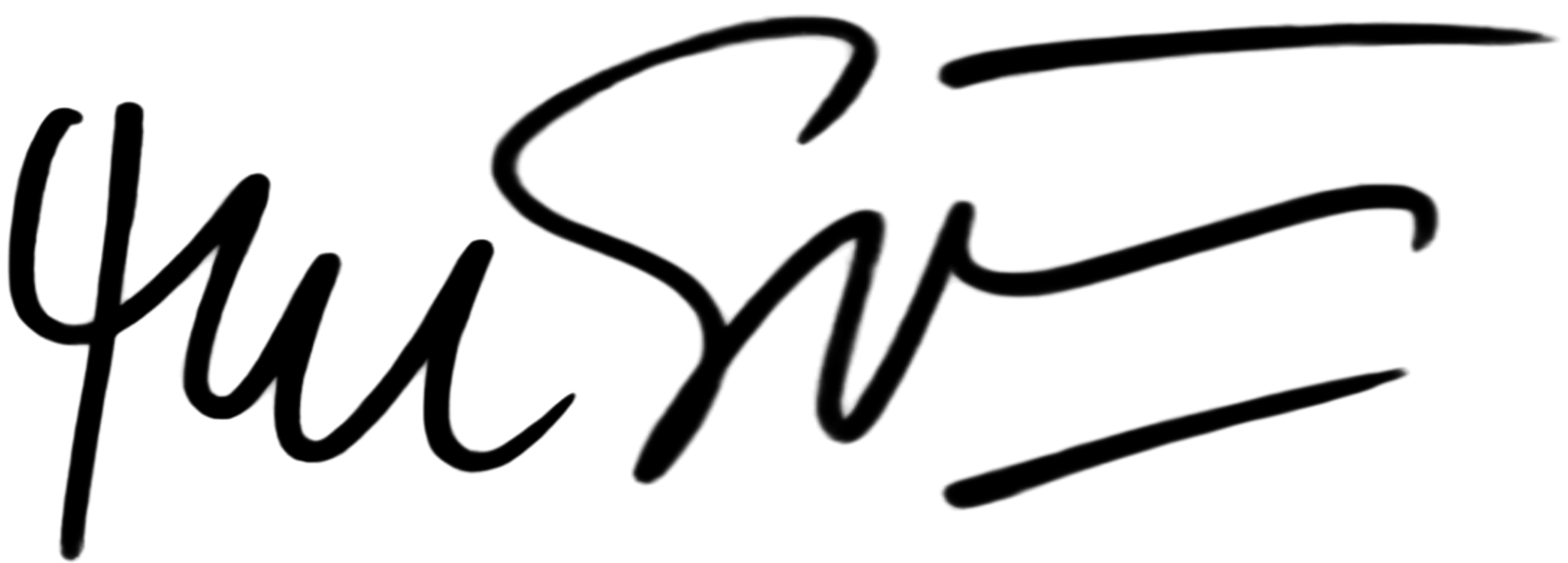

Michele Soavi (born 3 July 1957) is an Italian film and television director, screenwriter and actor, best known for his works in the horror genre. He began his career as a mentee to directors like Dario Argento and Lucio Fulci, before becoming one of the major figures of Italian horror cinema during the late 1980's and 1990's.

Internationally, his best known works include the films Stage Fright (1987), The Church (1989), and Cemetery Man (1994).

== Early life ==
Soavi was born into a well-to-do Milanese family in 1957. His father, Giorgio Soavi, was a poet, author, and journalist. His mother Lidia (née Olivetti) was the daughter of Adriano Olivetti, the founder of the Olivetti brand and a former member of the Chamber of Deputies.

A lifelong fan of horror films, who first saw Dario Argento's The Bird with the Crystal Plumage at the age of 12, Soavi enrolled in creative arts classes as a teenager, and worked at becoming an actor. He took acting lessons at the drama school of Alessandro Fersen, and also served as a cameraman.

== Career ==
=== Actor and assistant director ===
Soavi's filmmaking career began in earnest when he was offered an assistant director job by Marco Modugno after appearing as an extra in Modugno's 1979 film Bambule. Soavi continued to act in films such as Alien 2: On Earth and Lucio Fulci's City of the Living Dead, and served as an assistant director to Aristide Massacessi (Joe D'Amato), and occasionally appeared in bit parts in some of D'Amato's films.

Soavi later came into his own when he started his collaboration with famed Italian horror director Dario Argento, who used him as assistant director on the film Tenebrae (1981), Phenomena (1985), and Opera (1987). He was an assistant director to Lamberto Bava on A Blade in the Dark (1983), Blastfighter (1984), and Demons (1985).

He also acted in many of the films on which he worked, in parts ranging from minor cameo appearances to major supporting roles. Typical of Italian B-movies of the time, he often used an Anglicized pseudonym, including Michael Soavi, Michael Shaw, Michael Soft, and Michael Saroyan. Soavi also makes cameos in all the films he directed and assistant directed prior to 2000.

=== Film director ===
Soavi continued to work with Argento for several years; with his first credit as director being the documentary Dario Argento's World of Horror, followed by a pop promo for Bill Wyman. He directed his first feature film with 1987's Stage Fright for producer Joe D'Amato. He worked as assistant director to Terry Gilliam on The Adventures of Baron Munchausen in 1988, and followed this with his second feature film as director, 1989's La Chiesa (The Church). His third feature, The Sect (a.k.a. "The Devil's Daughter"), followed in 1990.

Soavi has been credited as continuing the traditions of Italian horror in the 1990s, directing the zombie love story Dellamorte Dellamore (a.k.a. Cemetery Man). The film was based on Tiziano Sclavi's novel of the same name, and the author was also known for being the creator of the Italian comic book Dylan Dog. "Dellamorte Dellamore" also starred Rupert Everett in the lead role. Soavi retreated from the film industry in the mid-1990s to care for his ailing son, before returning to work in Italian television. Quentin Tarantino offered him the director's chair on From Dusk till Dawn, but he turned it down as he didn't understand the script.

In 2006, Soavi returned to directing feature films with the Michele Placido-starring neo-noir The Goodbye Kiss, which was nominated for three David di Donatello Awards, and earned Soavi the Best Director Award at the Taormina Film Fest. He subsequently directed Blood of the Losers, a World War II drama, also starring Placido.

In 2018, he directed the fantasy comedy The Legend of the Christmas Witch.

== Filmography ==
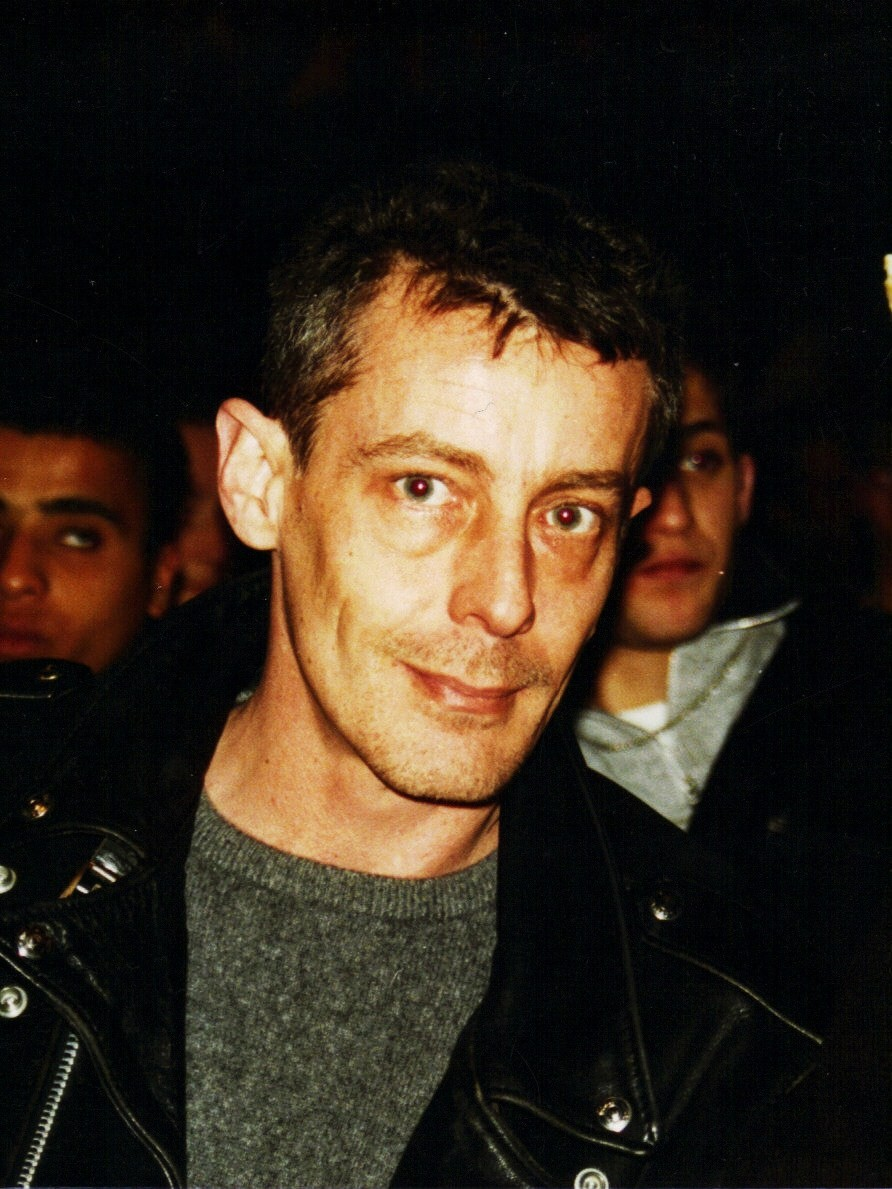
Soavi in 1994.

=== As director ===
- Dario Argento's World of Horror (1985) documentary
- The Valley (1985 short)
- Stage Fright (1987)
- The Church (1989) a.k.a. Demons 3
- The Sect (1991) a.k.a. The Devil's Daughter or Demons 4
- Cemetery Man (1994) a.k.a. Dellamorte Dellamore
- Ultimo 2 - La sfida (1999)
- Uno bianca (2001)
- Il testimone (2001)
- St. Francis (2002)
- Ultima pallottola (2003)
- Ultimo 3 - L'infiltrato (2004)
- The Goodbye Kiss (2006)
- Political Target (2006)
- Nassiryia - Per non dimenticare (2007)
- Blood of the Losers (2008)
- Adriano Olivetti: La forza di un Sogno (2013)
- Sfida al cielo - La narcotici 2 (2015)
- Rocco Schiavone (2016)
- Rocco Chinnici (2017)
- The Legend of the Christmas Witch (2018)

=== As assistant / second unit director ===
- 2020 Texas Gladiators (1982)
- Tenebrae (1982)
- A Blade in the Dark (1983 - actor)
- Endgame (1983)
- Blastfighter (1984)
- Phenomena (1985 - also actor)
- Demons (1985)
- Opera (1987)
- The Adventures of Baron Munchausen (1988)
- The Brothers Grimm (2005)

=== As actor ===
Soavi makes cameos in almost all the films he directed and assistant directed prior to 2000, Cemetery Man being an example of a movie he did have a part in. He has also acted, usually uncredited, in numerous films from other Italian horror directors.

- The Greatest Battle (1978)
- Little Lips (1978)
- Alien 2: On Earth (also known as Alien Terror) (1980)
- City of the Living Dead (also known as The Gates of Hell) (1980)
- Day of the Cobra (1980)
- Absurd (a.k.a. Anthropophagus 2) (1981)
- Caligula II: The Untold Story (1982)
- The New York Ripper (1982)
- The Atlantis Interceptors (also known as Atlantis Inferno) (1983)
- Dèmoni (1985) a.k.a. Demons
- The Black Cat (1989) a.k.a. De Profundis or Demons 6
