= Digitmovies AE =

Digitmovies Alternative Entertainment is an Italian label that starts in 2002 the rescue of Italian film music. Digitmovies AE has released over 100 soundtracks from many Italian original archives such as, C.A.M., Cinevox, Beat Records, EMI General music...

Title	Composer	Director	Year	Catalog #	Release date
The Best of the Italian Film Music	Various	Various	Various	CDDM001	15.09.2002
Il Disprezzo	Piero Piccioni	Jean-Luc Godard	1963	CDDM002	15.03.2003
Voci	Maurizio Abeni	Franco Giraldi	2000	CDDM003	15.03.2003
Avvocato Porta - Le nuove storie	Maurizio Abeni	Franco Giraldi	1997	CDDM004	01.05.2003
Piranha II	Stelvio Cipriani	James Cameron	1983	CDDM005	01.05.2003
La Leggenda della Pianista	Ennio Morricone	Giuseppe Tornatore	1998	CDDM006	01.05.2003
Terrore nello spazio	Gino Marinuzzi Jr.	Mario Bava	1965	CDDM007	24.07.2003
Sette Scialli di Seta Gialla / Killing Birds	Manuel de Sica / Carlo Maria Cordio	Sergio Pastore / Claudio Lattanzi	1972 / 1987	CDDM008	24.07.2003
La Notte dei Diavoli	Giorgio Gaslini	Giorgio Ferroni	1972	CDDM009	24.07.2003
Un Delitto Poco Comune	Pino Donaggio	Ruggero Deodato	1988	CDDM010	24.07.2003
Maschera di Cera	Maurizio Abeni	Sergio Stivaletti	1997	CDDM011	30.10.2003
L'anima gemella	Pino Donaggio	Sergio Rubini	2002	CDDM012	30.10.2003
La Collera del Vento	Augusto Martelli	Mario Camus	1970	CDDM014	25.02.2004
Le Monache di Sant'Arcangelo / Storia di una monaca di clausura	Piero Piccioni	Domenico Paolella	1973	CDDM015	22.03.2004
Il Tuo Vizio è una Stanza Chiusa e Solo io ne ho la Chiave	Bruno Nicolai	Sergio Martino	1972	CDDM016	22.03.2004
Quanto Costa Morire	Francesco De Masi	Sergio Merolle	1968	CDDM017	26.04.2004
Io sto con gli ippopotami	Walter Rizzati	Italo Zingarelli	1979	CDDM018	26.04.2004
Tutti i Colori del Buio	Bruno Nicolai	Sergio Martino	1972	CDDM019	16.06.2004
La Collina Degli Stivali	Carlo Rustichelli	Giuseppe Colizzi	1969	CDDM020	16.06.2004
Catacombs Curse IV: The Ultimate Sacrifice	Pino Donaggio	David Schmoeller	1988	CDDM021	16.06.2004
Maladolescenza	Pippo Caruso	Pier Giuseppe Murgia	1977	CDDM022	01.07.2004
Sella D'Argento	Franco Bixio / Fabio Frizzi / Vince Tempera	Lucio Fulci	1978	CDDM023	01.07.2004
Troppo per Vivere...Poco per Morire	Francesco De Masi	Michele Lupo	1967	CDDM024	01.07.2004
OK Connery Operation Kid Brother	Ennio Morricone / Bruno Nicolai	Alberto De Martino	1967	CDDM025	09.10.2004
Lo Chiamavano Trinità...	Franco Micalizzi	Enzo Barboni	1970	CDDM026	09.10.2004
Amico, Stammi Lontano Almeno un Palmo	Gianni Ferrio	Michele Lupo	1972	CDDM027	29.11.2004
La Coda dello Scorpione	Bruno Nicolai	Sergio Martino	1971	CDDM028	29.11.2004
Piedone L'Africano	Guido & Maurizio De Angelis	Steno	1978	CDDM029	27.01.2005
Eugenie… The Story of Her Journey into Perversion / De Sade '70	Bruno Nicolai	Jess Franco	1970	CDDM030	27.01.2005
Piedone Lo Sbirro	Guido & Maurizio De Angelis	Steno	1973	CDDM031	05.03.2005
Il Corsaro nero	Guido & Maurizio De Angelis	Sergio Sollima	1976	CDDM032	05.03.2005
La Dama Rossa Uccide Sette Volte	Bruno Nicolai	Emilio Miraglia	1972	CDDM033	05.05.2008
99 Donne	Bruno Nicolai	Jess Franco	1969	CDDM034	05.05.2005
La Maschera del Demonio / La Ragazza Che Sapeva Troppo	Roberto Nicolosi	Mario Bava	1960 / 1963	CDDM035	13.06.2005
Gentleman Jo...Uccidi	Bruno Nicolai / Ennio Morricone	Giorgio Stegani	1967	CDDM036	13.06.2005
Pensione Paura	Adolfo Waitzman	Francesco Barilli	1977	CDDM037	13.06.2005
Tre Donne / Correva l'anno di grazia 1870	Ennio Morricone	Alfredo Giannetti	1971	CDDM038	08.09.2005
La Morte Risale a Ieri Sera	Gianni Ferrio	Duccio Tessari	1970	CDDM039	08.09.2005
La Notte Che Evelyn Uscì dalla Tomba	Bruno Nicolai	Emilio Miraglia	1971	CDDM040	08.09.2005
La Frusta e Il Corpo The Whip and the Body / Sei Donne per L'Assassino Blood and Black Lace	Carlo Rustichelli	Mario Bava	1963 / 1964	CDDM041	16.11.2005
Piedone a Hong Kong	Guido & Maurizio De Angelis	Steno	1975	CDDM042	16.11.2005
I Quattro dell' Ave Maria	Carlo Rustichelli / Bruno Nicolai	Giuseppe Colizzi	1968	CDDM043	16.11.2005
Blindman	Stelvio Cipriani	Ferdinando Baldi	1971	CDDM044	09.12.2005
Un Bianco Vestito per Marialè	Fiorenzo Carpi / Bruno Nicolai	Romano Scavolini	1972	CDDM045	09.12.2005
Ecologia del Delitto Bay of Blood / Gli Orrori del Castello di Norimberga Baron Blood / Cani Arrabbiati	Stelvio Cipriani	Mario Bava	1971 / 1972 / 1974	CDDM046	09.12.2005
El Cisco	Bruno Nicolai	Sergio Bergonzelli	1966	CDDM047	15.02.2006
Il Federale	Ennio Morricone	Luciano Salce	1961	CDDM048	16.02.2006
La Battaglia del Deserto	Bruno Nicolai	Mino Loy	1969	CDDM049	15.02.2006
Senza Sapere Niente di Lei	Ennio Morricone	Luigi Comencini	1969	CDDM050	24.03.2006
Dio Perdona... Io No!	Carlo Rustichelli / Bruno Nicolai	Giuseppe Colizzi	1967	CDDM051	24.03.2006
Un'Ombra Nell'Ombra	Stelvio Cipriani	Pier Carpi	1979	CDDM052	24.03.2006
Cosa avete fatto a Solange?	Ennion Morricone	Massimo Dallamano	1972	CDDM053	26.04.2006
Carambola / Carambola Filotto Tutti in Buca	Franco Bixio / Fabio Frizzi / Vince Tempera	Ferdinando Baldi	1974 / 1975	CDDM054	26.04.2006
Quel Gran Pezzo della Ubalda Tutta Nuda e Tutta Calda	Bruno Nicolai	Mariano Laurenti	1972	CDDM055	26.04.2006
La Morte Cammina Con I Tacchi Alti	Stelvio Cipriani	Luciano Ercoli	1971	CDDM056	06.06.2006
Le fatiche di Ercole / Ercole e la Regina di Lidia	Enzo Masetti	Pietro Francisci	1958 / 1959	CDDM057	06.06.2006
I Vampiri / Caltiki - Il Mostro Immortale / Lisa e il Diavolo	Roman Vlad / Roberto Nicolosi / Carlo Savna	Riccardo Freda / Mario Bava	1956 / 1959 / 1973	CDDM058	06.06.2006
Chi L'Ha Vista Morire?	Ennio Morricone	Aldo Lado	1972	CDDM059	03.07.2006
Arrivano I Titani	Carlo Rustichelli	Duccio Tessari	1962	CDDM060	03.07.2006
Il Corsaro nero	Gino Peguri	Lorenzo Gicca Palli	1971	CDDM061	03.07.2006
Sette Note In Nero	Franco Bixio / Fabio Frizzi / Vince Tempera	Lucio Fulci	1977	CDDM062	19.09.2006
Kapò	Carlo Rustichelli	Gillo Pontecorvo	1959	CDDM063	19.09.2006
Il Gatto Dagli Occhi di Giada	Trans Europa Express	Antonio Bido	1977	CDDM064	19.09.2006
Addio, Fratello Crudele	Ennio Morricone	Giuseppe Patroni Griffi	1971	CDDM065	31.10.2006
Klaus Kinski Horror Trilogy : La Morte ha Sorriso all'Assassino / Mano Che Nutre La Morte / Le Amanti del Mostro	Berto Pisano / Stefano Liberati / Elio Maestosi	Joe D'Amato / Yilmaz Duru / Sergio Garrone	1973 / 1974	CDDM066	31.10.2006
Una Vergine Tra I Morti Viventi	Bruno Nicolai	Jess Franco	1973	CDDM067	31.10.2006
Spasmo	Ennio Morricone	Umberto Lenzi	1974	CDDM068	30.11.2006
L'Iguana Dalla Lingua di Fuoco	Stelvio Cipriani	Riccardo Freda	1971	CDDM069	30.11.2006
Il Soldato di ventura	Guido & Maurizio De Angelis	Pasquale Festa Campanile	1976	CDDM070	30.11.2006
Occhio alla Penna	Ennio Morricone	Michele Lupo	1981	CDDM071	08.01.2007
Ercole al Centro della Terra	Armando Trovajoli	Mario Bava	1961	CDDM072	08.01.2007
The Christmas That Almost Wasn't	Bruno Nicolai	Rossano Brazzi	1966	CDDM073	20.12.2006
Sodom and Gomorrah	Miklós Rózsa	Robert Aldrich	1962	CDDM074	05.02.2007
L'Uomo Senza Memoria	Gianni Ferrio	Duccio Tessari	1974	CDDM075	05.02.2007
Roma Contra Roma	Roberto Nicolosi	Giuseppe Vari	1964	CDDM076	05.02.2007
Don Camillo e i Giovani D'Oggi	Carlo Rustichelli	Mario Camerini	1972	CDDM077	30.03.2007
Milano trema—La polizia vuole giustizia	Guido & Maurizio De Angelis	Sergio Martino	1973	CDDM078	26.03.2007
Fenomenal e Il Tesoro di Tutankamen	Bruno Nicolai	Ruggero Deodato	1968	CDDM079	26.03.2007
Il Filio di Spartacus	Piero Piccione	Sergio Corbucci	1963	CDDM080	26.03.2007
Per Un Pugno Nell'Occhio	Francesco De Masi	Michele Lupo	1970	CDDM081	04.05.2007
Missione Speciale Lady Chaplin	Bruno Nicolai	Alberto De Martino / Sergio Grieco	1966	CDDM082	04.05.2007
Uccidete Il Vitello Grasso e Arrostitelo	Ennio Morricone	Salvatore Samperi	1970	CDDM083	04.05.2007
La Banda del Gobbo	Franco Micalizzi	Umberto Lenzi	1978	CDDM084	04.05.2007
La Tarantola dal Ventre Nero	Ennio Morricone	Paolo Cavara	1971	CDDM085	15.06.2007
La tigre è ancora viva: Sandokan alla riscossa!	Guido & Maurizio De Angelis	Sergio Sollima	1977	CDDM086	15.06.2007
La Ragazzina	Nico Fidenco	Mario Imperoli	1974	CDDM087	25.06.2007
Sei Jellato, Amico Hai Incontrato Sacramento / I Due Volti della Paura	Giorgio Cristallini	Tulio Demicheli	1970 / 1972	CDDM088	25.06.2007
Agi Murad Il Diavolo Bianco / Ester e Il Re / Gli Invasori	Roberto Nicolosi / Angelo Francesco Lavagnino	Riccardo Freda / Raoul Walsh / Mario Bava	1959 / 1960 / 1961	CDDM089	13.09.2007
Ercole alla conquista di Atlantide	Gino Marinuzzi Jr.	Vittorio Cottafavi	1961	CDDM090	13.09.2007
La Polizia Accusa: Il Servizio Segreto Uccide	Luciano Michelini	Sergio Martino	1975	CDDM091	13.09.2007
Preparati La Bara	Gianfranco & Gian Piero Reverberi	Ferdinando Baldi	1968	CDDM092	13.09.2007
La Guerra di Troia / La leggenda di Enea	Giovanni Fusco	Giorgio Ferroni / Giorgio Venturini	1961 / 1962	CDDM093	14.11.2007
Milano odia: la polizia non può sparare	Ennio Morricone	Umberto Lenzi	1974	CDDM094	14.11.2007
Corri Uomo Corri	Bruno Nicolai	Sergio Sollima	1968	CDDM095	14.11.2007
Uomini e No	Ennio Morricone	Valentino Orsini	1980	CDDM096	14.11.2007
Gatti Rossi In Un Labirinto di Vetro	Bruno Nicolai	Umberto Lenzi	1975	CDDM097	14.12.2007
La poliziotta	Gianni Ferrio	Steno	1974	CDDM098	14.12.2007
Solamente Nero	Stelvio Cipriani	Antonio Bido	1978	CDDM099	14.12.2007
Italian Police Deluxe 3 CD Box : La Mano Spietata della Legge / L'Uomo della Strada Fa Giustizia / Il Grande Racket	Stelvio Cipriani / Bruno Nicolai / Guido & Maurizio De Angelis	Mario Gariazzo / Umberto Lenzi / Enzo G. Castellari	1973 / 1975 / 1976	CDDM100	14.12.2007
La battaglia di Maratona	Roberto Nicolosi	Jacques Tourneur / Mario Bava	1959	CDDM101	25.02.2008
Matrimonio Con Vizietto	Ennio Morricone	Georges Lautner	1985	CDDM102	25.02.2008
Femina Ridens	Stelvio Cipriani	Piero Schivazappa	1969	CDDM103	25.02.2008
Blue Jeans	Nico Fidenco	Mario Imperoli	1975	CDDM104	25.02.2008
Escalation	Ennio Morricone	Roberto Faenza	1968	CDDM105	18.03.2008
La Liceale / La Liceale nella Classe Dei Ripetenti	Vittorio Pezzolla / Gianni Ferrio	Michele Massimo Tarantini / Mariano Laurenti	1975 / 1978	CDDM106	25.04.2008
Il rosso segno della follia	Sante Maria Romitelli	Mario Bava	1970	CDDM107	25.04.2008
I Giganti della Tessaglia	Carlo Rustichelli	Riccardo Freda	1961	CDDM108	25.04.2008
Ruba Al Prossimo Tuo	Ennio Morricone	Francesco Maselli	1969	CDDM109	15.05.2008
I Corpi Presentano Tracce di Violenza Carnale	Guido & Maurizio De Angelis	Sergio Martino	1973	CDDM110	15.05.2008
Il Dio Chiamato Dorian	Peppino De Luca	Massimo Dallamano	1970	CDDM111	15.05.2008
I Lunghi Capelli della Morte	Carlo Rustichelli	Antonio Margheriti	1964	CDDM112	11.06.2008
Il terrore dei barbari	Carlo Rustichelli	Carlo Campogalliani	1959	CDDM113	07.07.2008
Macchie Solari	Ennio Morricone	Armando Crispino	1975	CDDM114	11.06.2008
Vivo Per La Tua Morte	Carlo Savina	Camillo Bazzoni	1968	CDDM115	11.06.2008
DellaMorte DellAmore - Cemetery Man	Manuel de Sica	Michele Soavi	1994	CDDM116	07.07.2008
Les Cauchemars Nassent La Nuit - Nightmare Come At Night	Bruno Nicolai	Jesus Franco	1970	CDDM117	07.07.2008
Superfantagenio	Fabio Frizzi	Bruno Corbucci	1986	CDDM118	18.09.2008
Poliziotto Senza Paura / Sbirro La Tua Legge è Lenta...La Mia...No!	Stelvio Cipriani	Stelvio Massi	1977 / 1979	CDDM119	23.10.2008
La Banda J.S.: Cronaca criminale del Far West	Ennio Morricone	Sergio Corbucci	1972	CDDM120	18.09.2008
Il Compagno Don Camillo	Alessandro Cicognini	Luigi Comencini	1965	CDDM121	23.10.2008
La Lama nel Corpo - Lo Spettro	Francesco De Masi	Elio Scardamaglia / Riccardo Freda	1966 / 1963	CDDM122	19.11.2008
Annibale	Carlo Rustichelli	Carlo Ludovico Bragaglia / Edgar G. Ulmer	1959	CDDM123	19.11.2008
La Svergognata - Suggestionata	Berto Pisano / Carlo Savina	Giuliano Biagetti / Alfredo Rizzo	1974 / 1978	CDDM124	10.12.2008
Nel Segno di Roma / Ponzio Pilato / Il Colosso di Roma Muzio Scevola	Angelo Francesco Lavagnino	Guido Brignone / Gian Paolo Callegari / Giorgio Ferroni	1959 / 1962 / 1964	CDDM125	10.12.2008
Arrivano Joe e Margherito / Simone e Matteo: Un Gioco da Ragazzi	Guido & Maurizio De Angelis	Giuseppe Colizzi / Giuliano Carnimeo	1974 / 1975	CDDM126	29.01.2009
Noi Lazzaroni	Ennio Morricone	Giorgio Pelloni	1978	CDDM127	29.01.2009
The Year of the Cannibals	Ennio Morricone	Liliana Cavani	1970	CDDM128	27.02.2009
Ursus nella Terra di Fuoco	Carlo Savina	Giorgio Simonelli	1963	CDDM129	27.02.2009
Genova a Mano Armata	Franco Micalizzi	Mario Lanfranchi	1976	CDDM130	30.03.2009
La Più Allegra Storia del Decamerone	Daniele Patucchi	Adrian Hoven / David F. Friedman	1971	CDDM131	30.03.2009
Defense de Savoir	Bruno Nicolai	Nadine Trintignant	1973	CDDM132	30.03.2009
Laure	Franco Micalizzi	Emmanuelle Arsan / Ovidio G. Assonitis	1976	CDDM133	29.04.2009
La Corta notte delle bambole di vetro	Ennio Morricone	Aldo Lado	1971	CDDM134	29.04.2009
Il Ladro di Bagdad	Carlo Rustichelli	Arthur Lubin / Bruno Vailati	1961	CDDM135	29.06.2009
... E poi lo Chiamarono il Magnifico	Guido & Maurizio De Angelis	Enzo Barboni	1972	CDDM136	29.06.2009
Le Streghe	Piero Piccioni	Mauro Bolognini / Vittorio De Sica / Pier Paolo Pasolini / Franco Rossi / Luchino Visconti	1967	CDDM137	29.06.2009
L'assedio di Siracusa	Angelo Francesco Lavagnino	Pietro Francisci	1960	CDDM138	11.09.2009
Missione Eroica, Pompieri 2 / Scuola di Ladri, Parte Seconda	Bruno Zambrini	Giorgio Capitani / Neri Parenti	1987	CDDM139	29.06.2009
Oggi a me... Domani a te!	Angelo Francesco Lavagnino	Tonino Cervi	1968	CDDM140	11.09.2009
Mio Caro Assassino	Ennio Morricone	Tonino Valerii	1972	CDDM141	30.09.2009
L'ultima neve di primavera / L'albero dalle Foglie Rosa / Bianchi Cavalli d'agosto	Franco Micalizzi	Raimondo Del Balzo / Armando Nannuzzi	1973 / 1974 / 1975	CDDM142	30.09.2009
Il Triangolo delle Bermude (The Bermuda Triangle) / Bermude: La Fossa Maledetta / Uragano sulle Bermude l'ultimo S.O.S. (Encuentro en el Abiso)	Stelvio Cipriani	René Cardona Jr. / Tonino Ricci	1978 / 1978 / 1979	CDDM143	04.11.2009
TRE VOLTI DELLA PAURA (Black Sabbath)	Roberto Nicolosi	Mario Bava	1963	CDDM144	04.11.2009
Una Ragione per vivere e una per morire / La Notte dei Serpenti	Riz Ortolani	Tonino Valerii / Giulio Petroni	1972 / 1969	CDDM145	04.11.2009
… E Poi Non ne Rimase Nessuno (Ten Little Indians) / (Ein unbekannter rechnet ab)	Bruno Nicolai	Peter Collinson	1974	CDDM146	04.11.2009
