= Almost Human (1974 film) =

1974 Italian crime film by Umberto Lenzi

- Italian theatrical poster by Giuliano Nistri
- Milano odia: la polizia non può sparare
- Directed by: Umberto Lenzi
- Screenplay by: Ernesto Gastaldi
- Produced by: Luciano Martino
- Starring: Tomas Milian; Henry Silva; Laura Belli; Ray Lovelock; Gino Santercole; Anita Strindberg
- Cinematography: Federico Zanni
- Edited by: Eugenio Alabiso
- Music by: Ennio Morricone
- Production company: Dania Film
- Distributed by: Interfilm
- Release date: 8 August 1974 (Italy)
- Running time: 100 minutes
- Country: Italy
- Box office: ITL1.168 billion

Almost Human (Italian: Milano odia: la polizia non può sparare, lit. 'Milan Hates: The Police Can't Shoot') is a 1974 Italian poliziottesco film directed by Umberto Lenzi and starring Tomas Milian, Henry Silva, Laura Belli, Ray Lovelock, Gino Santercole and Anita Strindberg. Milian stars as Giulio Sacchi, an arrogant and murderous small-time criminal who convinces two gullible associates, Carmine (Lovelock) and Vittorio (Santercole), into joining him for a series of increasingly sordid crimes — most notably the kidnapping of heiress Marilú Porrino (Belli) — which test police Inspector Grandi's (Silva) belief in mainstream law enforcement.

While negatively received during its original run, Almost Human' is now regarded as one of the best Italian crime films of the 1970s, and marked the first of several collaborations between Lenzi and Milian.

The film has been released under a variety of titles, with the original English-dubbed export prints bearing the title The Executioner. In North America, it opened in limited release as The Kidnap of Mary Lou in 1975, before receiving a wider release as The Death Dealer. Its most enduring English title, Almost Human, stems from a 1980 reissue, for which it was dubiously marketed as a horror film.

== Plot ==
A bunch of thieves kidnap a boy in a red hoodie from his mother's arms. This is followed by an action-packed car chase full of breaking boxes, defacing cars, and slim getaways. The chase ends when the kidnappers are saved by an oncoming train, which cuts off the police from their trail. They find this a perfect opportunity to dump the kid and make their getaway. The boy is returned to his family but the kidnappers' gang beat the thieves up for their failure.

Following a castration threat, the kidnapper goes home to rape his girlfriend. He then robs a cigarette dispenser and stabs the beat cop who catches him. This leads to a detective to start asking questions. The following day, while the thief is picking up his aforementioned girlfriend from her office, he notices the young brown-haired daughter of his girlfriend's boss, and decides to kidnap her. After a love-making session with his girlfriend in her apartment, the kidnapper leaves to find his friend and convinces him to join his plan. We are shown how tough a cop the detective is through a cut scene. The kidnapper and his gang start stalking the girl while she's playing tennis with her father and his friends. Using his girlfriend's stolen red car, the thieves go buy guns from an old confidant of theirs, nicknamed Papà. The guns are worth ITL100,000 each and, if they kill someone, their confidant keeps their deposit. Not wanting to pay their confidant the deposit, they murder Papà and his staff, and make their escape.

They then catch up with their target while she is discussing her future with the boy she wants to marry in his car in the middle of a forest. Her boyfriend shows his reluctance to marry her unless she refuses her inheritance on the basis of principle. The girl refuses and starts making out with her boyfriend against his will. The kidnappers then attack and kidnap her and murder her boyfriend. However, the girl then escapes into the forest until she reaches a bungalow where she is taken in, and the family agree to protect her. The bad guys break in nevertheless, murdering everyone, including a young child, and run off with the girl, who they stash in an abandoned ship yard. After returning his girlfriend's car to her, he murders her by drowning and disposes of her car.

During all this, the inspector gets a lead when three bad guys make a ransom call and ask for "No police interference". While posting a ransom letter that they had forced the girl to write, one of the thieves realizes the cops have discovered the murder of the daughter of his girlfriend's boss. The cops conclude all the murders and thefts were by the same gang. Deducing the kidnappers knew the girlfriend, the cops decide to visit her apartment. The protagonist notices this and follows them back to his own apartment and sees them discover his connection to the whole mess. Scared, he calls his acquaintance, the guy who had beat him up, and asks for a deal. He then goes to the police and acts innocent to throw off suspicion from himself. When he and the detective visit the acquaintance, he covers for his "friend", and then threatens the kidnapper with castration again. After the cops start closing in on him, the protagonist goes insane and murders the hostage, a shoot-out ensues, and only the protagonist survives. He runs off to hide, but the detective finds him the next day and shoots him in the head.

== Cast ==
- Tomas Milian as Giulio Sacchi
- Henry Silva as Inspector Walter Grandi
- Laura Belli as Marilù Porrino (Mary Lou in English)
- Ray Lovelock as Carmine
- Gino Santercole as Vittorio
- Anita Strindberg as Ione Tucci
- Mario Piave as Grandi's Assistant
- Luciano Catenacci as Ugo Maione
- Guido Alberti as Mr. Porrino
- Lorenzo Piani as Gianni
- Pippo Starnazza as "Papà"
- Tom Felleghy as Judge Rossi

As was frequently the case in Italian genre films, the film was shot without sound and dubbed in post-production, often by different actors than the stars appearing on screen. For the first time, Milian was dubbed by Ferruccio Amendola, who would become a fixture of the actor's crime film cycle. Strindberg was voiced by Paila Pavese, Lovelock by Massimo Turci and Santercole by Michele Gammino.

== Production ==
=== Development ===
Although it is not a sequel, the film's original title is a callback to Milano trema: la polizia vuole giustizia (lit. 'Milan Trembles: The Police Wants Justice'), a successful 1973 crime film written by Ernesto Gastaldi and produced by Luciano Martino, and known in English as The Violent Professionals. The story was informed by the social climate of the times, but unlike Milano trema, it was not inspired by any specific event. Martino wanted his brother Sergio—who had helmed Milano trema—to make this as well, but he passed in favor of the melodrama La bellissima estate. When Umberto Lenzi was hired, he did not perform any rewrites, marking the first time he did not contribute to the narrative of one of his films. Lenzi did not consider it to be a poliziesco because it centers on the criminals, and as such more closely resembles French film noirs, such as those of Jacques Becker.

=== Casting ===
The cast saw several changes and role permutations. The part of Sacchi was originally offered to Franco-Swiss actor Marc Porel but, based on their meeting, Lenzi found him unbearable and refused to work with him. Milian initially agreed to a featured role, which entailed fewer days of work and a reduced rate. This made commissioner Grandi the likeliest option for him. However his real-life friend Ray Lovelock, who was under consideration to play a yet-to-be-determined antagonist, suggested that Milian switch to Sacchi, while he could do Carmine. Martino agreed, but would not upgrade Milian's salary to match the larger role. The Cuban relented, as he felt the part was strong enough to benefit his career down the line. According to Lenzi, Milano trema's Richard Conte was then tabbed to play Grandi, but he had to be replaced due to unforeseen circumstances (which the director incorrectly remembered as being Conte's own death). Henry Silva was brought in on short notice, but he did not fit Lenzi's vision of the character, which therefore required streamlining to fit his limited acting range.

=== Filming ===
Although the film is set in Lombardy, early filming took place in Lazio, and was reported underway on 25 Mars 1974. The crane ship used as the kidnappers' lair was located in Passo Corese, which doubled for the Milan suburbs of Cologno Monzese in some shots and Rho in others. Additional scenes were shot at D.E.A.R. Studios in Rome. The press announced that filming had resumed in Milan on 11 April. Sacchi's hangout, where the final showdown between Silva and Milian also takes place, was a now closed bar on via Palmanova. The car drowning, set at Lake Como in storyline, was actually shot at Lake Iseo near Castro. The film briefly ventures into Switzerland for a scene in the border city of Chiasso. This was a tightly run shoot, with Lenzi's contract provisioning seven weeks of work, a limit of 15,000 feet of film and the obligation to build a car chase around stock footage from Milano trema.

The film was the first collaboration between Lenzi and director of photography Federico Zanni, who was assigned to him by Martino. Zanni lacked experience with filming at night, which required one such scene to be reshot, but otherwise proved competent. However, Lenzi was underwhelmed by assistant director Alessandro Metz, who did not have a good command of action, and set designer Antonio Visione. By his own admission, Milian had a longstanding penchant for drinking but, as a method actor, his character's dissolute lifestyle provided him with justification to take his alcohol consumption one step further. Lenzi also remembered that he laced his vodka with tablets of Optalidon, a tranquilizer. Milian devised his own origin story for inspiration, which Gastaldi remembered as being even more sordid than the filmed script. The writer credited a large part of the movie's eventual tone to the actor's personality.

== Release ==
=== Pre-release ===
Milano odia received an under-18 ban from the Italian Ministry of Tourism and Entertainment. The producers returned to the review board with a slightly trimmed version, but the cuts were not found to have significantly softened the film's tone, and the rating was upheld for the rest of its theatrical run.

=== Italy ===
The picture was released domestically by Interfilm and opened on 8 August 1974. Its was a solid performer, grossing ITL1,168,745,000.

=== United States ===
In the U.S., the film's rights were acquired by Joseph Brenner Associates. Brenner re-scored and re-edited portions of the film, shoretening it to 92 minutes. He also re-titled it The Kidnap of Mary Lou. English-language source materials later used to restore the film suggest that the intended export title was The Executioner.

Brenner gave the film its U.S. debut in Chicago on 24 October 1975 for an exclusive engagement at the M&R Oriental theatre, through regional subdistributor William Lange & Associates. The film drew a mediocre 3,200 patrons for $11,200 between its Wednesday opening and the end of the weekend, and disappeared after a few more Illinois dates.

It was relaunched under the title The Death Dealer on 12 March 1976 in Houston, where Brenner had opened Martino's hit Torso. An October 1975 trade ad from Brenner announced both the opening of The Kidnap of Mary Lou and the pending release of a film called The Death Dealers, indicating that the title was already being considered, whether for this film or another. While Brenner claimed that The Death Dealer's Houston debut had outperformed that of Torso, this was not borne by the film's ensuing run, which reached Philadelphia/South Jersey in March 1977 but stopped short of New York City.

== Reception ==
=== Contemporary ===
Initial reaction to the film was largely negative. Milian's heavy-handed performance was frequently derided, while the storyline was alternately viewed as derivative, or pandering and over-the-top.

==== Italy ====
Aurora Santuari of Paese Sera found "Tomas Milian at his worst, almost a caricature of himself" and added that "[n]either can the situations be considered typical (at least in Italy), nor does the fiction find its own internal logic in the mechanical conventions of spectacle, here more than ever trivialized by dialogue and other elements." Morando Morandini of Il Giorno wrote: "Aside from the systematic falsification of facts and the peddling of the ugliest prejudices that it shares with other films of the same genre, the narrative is conducted with the most visceral depictions of violence and a brazen disregard for logic and verisimilitude. All of this is at the service of Tomas Milian, whose buffoonery now knows no bounds." Aggeo Savioli of far left daily L'Unità commented: "If Umberto Lenzi, with this worthless mess, intended to demonstrate the reactionary thesis according to which the police should be given free rein, beyond any control, in the repression of crime, he has truly failed in his intent. In the hypothetical (and somewhat extreme) case depicted, what is lacking is not weapons or gunfire, but functioning brains, adequate investigative techniques, and rigorous application of the law. In any case, it is pointless to take this kind of product seriously." He concluded that "Milian's histrionic show, in which he performs (dubbed [...]) the role of Giulio, only provokes laughter, or a sense of pity."

R.P. of the Corriere della sera acknowledged: "Brimming with statements of principle on classism as a primary cause for delinquency, the film does not hide its moderate sociological ambitions, and focuses on sketching a gallery of characters that seem drawn from the seediest true crime pages. But verisimilitude does not always equate veracity, and good intentions end up lost in an orgy of gratuitous and tedious sadism, whose sole purpose is to justify the radical ending." Achille Valdata of La Stampa sera wrote that "[t]he film has an undeniable grasp of the spectacular, but its credibility is eroded by repeated and leering excesses in cruelty. Even such commitment to truculence can become cause for laughter, especially when the actor tasked with playing the crazed brute acts so over the top." A staff review from Il Messaggero was more positive, assessing: "Overflowing with violence and never at a loss for action, although built on conventional templates, Lenzi's work is a decent watch. Tomas Milian [is] a good embodiment of a paranoid gangster".

==== North America ====
In an early U.S. review, Dale Adamson of the Houston Chronicle wrote that "The Death Dealers [sic]—by virtue of its lack of originality or, even, well-aimed imitation—doesn't offer enough emotional involvement for even the shock value of violence to have its effect. [...] Unfortunately, the irony that could have made Death Dealers an Italian reiteration of Dick Tracy and Dirty Harry is passed over in favor of a superficial sort of portrait of a psychopath." Similarly, David Curow of The Hamilton Spectator complained that "there is more to filmmaking than throwing together explicit scenes, foul language and a seemingly endless stream of blood and gore." He deemed the film "[s]o definitely a carbon copy (and a bad one at that) of the standard Hollywood kidnap story that it appears nothing short of laughable."

Ted Mahar of Portland's Oregonian noted that Almost Human "revels in detailing Milian's sadism, drawing [it] out in loud, red details. The message of the film, whether it is tacked on as a justification of the violence that preceded it or is a sincere statement of philosophy, is simply ludicrous. Many forces have contributed to what is called revolving door justice in many countries, but this film really shows sloppy and intuitive police work, and it is pure writer's contrivance that puts Milian back in circulation." Steve Millburg of the Omaha World-Herald dimissed a "sordid story" and noted that "[o]n the few occasions the film tries to be funny, it isn't." He opined that "[t]he acting, dialogue and everything else about the film are terrible", and further suffer from being "ineptly dubbed". Lor. of Variety found that the "[m]ain wonderment of the film is how scruffy, unappealing and hammy Tomas Milian ever became a local superstar on the basis of roles like this one", while "Silva gives a tired, poorly dubbed (with his own voice, however) walkthrough mouthing off Dirty Harry platitudes." He assessed that "[t]echnical credits are standard for the chase and shoot genre."

=== Retrospective ===
The film's standing has greatly improved with time. Its 2005 DVD reissue was a critic's pick for The New York Times' Dave Kehr. Although he conceded that the kidnapping plot was "half-baked", he praised Milian's portrayal as "close to Al Pacino's Scarface, but without the camp exaggeration" and noted that "[t]his genuinely disturbing film anticipates John McNaughton's notorious Henry: Portrait of a Serial Killer in its up-close sadism but displays even less moral distance from its repellent protagonist." Don Guarisco of AllMovie deemed that "[t]his sick yet slick entry in the Italian crime film cycle of the 1970s is an archetypal example of the form, mixing sleaze and action in a manner that is compelling and unnerving all at once. The script moves along at a snappy pace, punctuating its storyline with bursts of brutal, sometimes perverse violence, and Umberto Lenzi's direction gives the mayhem a crisp, clean visual style that one wouldn't necessarily expect from such a tale. [...] Milian gives an unforgettable performance [...] Silva is given less screen time but effectively utilizes his stark visage and world-weary quality to make his scenes count."

Adrian Smith of Cinema Retro deemed that the picture "may be derivative of the American cop thriller, but it is also an exciting and shocking political critique of Italian society [...] With a terrific heavy-rock score from none other than Ennio Morricone, Almost Human is an exciting film from the golden period of Italian exploitation cinema". Manlio Gomarasca of Italian genre magazine Nocturno wrote that it "has become a classic" of its genre and added that "Sacchi is probably the most chilling villain figure brought to the screen in an Italian poliziesco/noir precisely because he is fundamentally weak, insecure and at the same time crazy, greedy and ruthless. Milian is superb as he descends into this whirlwind of depravation and doubts, building up on his face an imperceptible array of nervous tics, sweating profusely for the whole film and whimpering like a child when his character ends up in the clutches of the police."

== Soundtrack ==
Milano odia's score was composed by Ennio Morricone, in his second and last collaboration with Lenzi after Spasmo a few months prior. Unusually, Morricone reviewed the assembly cut with Lenzi and editor Eugenio Alabiso, and instructed them where to put his music and where to keep the track silent. The music was recorded at Rome's Ortophonic Studios and conducted by Morricone's protege Bruno Nicolai. According to Lenzi, Morricone's wife was so upset by the film's violence that she dissuaded him from collaborating to the director's subsequent works.

An LP was initially considered by RCA Italiana, but it was passed on in a favor of the inclusion of select tracks on the compilation Le pellicole della violenza, published by the same label in 1975. An expanded track selection was offered on a 1994 split CD, also from RCA, which paired it with Morricone's score for The Human Factor. In 2007, a comprehensive edition was published for the first time by Digitmovies, as part of a series of poliziotteschi reissues.

=== Cover versions ===
The film's main theme has been covered by jazzman John Zorn on his 1986 album The Big Gundown, which consists mostly of Morricone covers. Images of Milian, Silva and Belli appear on the front and back sleeves of the album's 15th anniversary reissue. Poliziesco-influenced Italian jazz band Calibro 35 included a cover of the main theme on their 2010 album Ritornano quelli di... Calibro 35.

=== Live-to-picture concerts ===
Among the dates played by Calibro 35 in support of their 2010 album were several live scorings of the entire film, starting with a 17 July show at the Fortezza da Basso in Florence. The project was born of an encounter with Lenzi on a radio program where they were joint guests, and the band has since periodically revisited the performance.

== Post-release ==
=== Re-issue as Almost Human (1980) ===

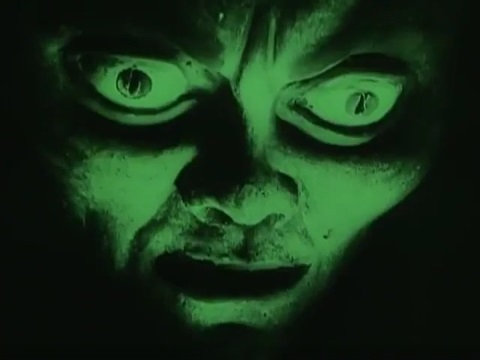
An image from 1920's The Golem (above) was used to misrepresent the film as a horror piece during its 1980 reissue as Almost Human (left).

As early as May 1978, the trade press reported that Brenner intended to repackage the film as Almost Human. However, the first screenings under that moniker do not seem to have taken place until 11 April 1980 in several Texas cities. The film reached New York City on 18 July 1980. Brenner had already used the new title as part of a slogan for the horror film Shock Waves ("Once They Were Almost Human"). The veteran distributor, who was known as an unscrupulous exploiter, also changed the film's key art to an image of the demon Astaroth from the horror classic The Golem, in a blatant attempt to misrepresent it as a monster flick. Variety opined that "[o]nly hit-and-run bookings can sustain this marketing ploy." Genre historians have noted that the trailer for Martino's 1971 production, the giallo The Case of the Scorpion's Tail, already made incongruous use of the same Astaroth image. Even under this new guise, the film drew a weak $120,000 across 43 screens in its New York debut and quickly disappeared from circulation again.

=== Home media ===
In Italy, the film was released on tape by General Video, and on a double DVD with Milano trema by Alan Young Pictures.

In the U.S., it was brought to videocassette by Prism Entertainment on 16 February 1988. While that edition kept the Almost Human title, it used a different artwork and slogan which made it clearer that it was a crime film. A DVD was released on 26 July 2005 in the U.S. by NoShame, still as Almost Human, which was billed as its first uncut release in the territory. A U.K. DVD issued by Shameless Screen Entertainment on 18 July 2011 was billed as the film's first ever appearance in the territory. Shameless brought the film to U.K. Blu-ray in 2017, and U.S. company Code Red followed suit in 2018. Their edition included both the original version and Joseph Brenner's shorter edit, as well as a reversible cover based on 1976's Death Dealer poster.

=== Television and streaming ===
In 2006, Lenzi recorded a feature-length commentary with critic Alberto Farina, commissioned by state-owned company RAI for a series of dual audio broadcasts of Italian films. It has since been rerun on various channels of the group.

=== Special screenings ===
In 2014, the film was selected for inclusion in The Italian Connection, a retrospective of Italian crime films from the 1960s and 1970s presented by New York's Anthology Film Archives. The film was shown at the 2024 San Sebastián Film Festival during a retrospective entitled Violent Italy: Italian Crime Films. In 2026, the film was screened by the French Cinematheque as part of Italie, années de plomb (lit. 'Italy, Years of Lead'), a retrospective held in conjunction with the release of the book Rosso sangue : Le cinéma italien des années de plomb (lit. 'Rosso Sangue: Italian Cinema in the Years of Lead') by Cinematheque president and film critic Jean-François Rauger.

== Legacy ==
Despite their conflicting personalities, Lenzi directed Milian in five more pictures: Syndicate Sadists, The Tough Ones, The Cynic, the Rat and the Fist, Free Hand for a Tough Cop and Brothers Till We Die. Milian's antiheroes became increasingly sympathetic, with the last two starring lovable rogue Er Monnezza ('Trash'). After Milian scored an all-audience hit with The Cop in Blue Jeans, whose protagonist retained many of Monnezza's traits, he focused on a lucrative association with the director of that film, comedy specialist Bruno Corbucci.

=== Non-fiction books ===
In 2013, Ernesto Gastaldi self-published his original screenplay in book form. In 2018, Italian publisher Milieu Edizioni issued film historian Paolo Spagnuolo's Milano odia: La polizia non può sparare – Storia di un cult nell'Italia degli anni settenta, a book about the making of the film which includes a reprint of the full screenplay. Lenzi wrote the foreword, while Enzo Castellari contributed a postface.

=== In popular culture ===
Italian pop singer Max Pezzali digitally replaces Milian in a clip taken from the film's finale, as part of the music video for his 2011 Sanremo Festival single "Il mio secondo tempo", which is set at a cinema in February 1976 and features nods to various Luciano Martino productions from the era. The video was directed by the Manetti Bros.
