= Demons 3 =

Demons 3 may refer to:

- The Church (1989 film), known during production as Demons 3
- The Ogre (1989 film), known outside Italy as Demons III: The Ogre
- Dèmoni 3, a 1991 film translated from Italian as Demons 3
