= Delitto sull'autostrada =

1982 film by Bruno Corbucci

- Italian theatrical release poster by Renato Casaro
- Directed by: Bruno Corbucci
- Written by: Mario Amendola; Bruno Corbucci
- Starring: Tomas Milian
- Cinematography: Silvano Ippoliti
- Edited by: Daniele Alabiso
- Music by: Franco Micalizzi
- Release date: 30 September 1982
- Running time: 91 minutes
- Country: Italy
- Language: Italian

Delitto sull'autostrada (Crime on the Highway) is a 1982 Italian "poliziottesco"-comedy film directed by Bruno Corbucci. It is the ninth chapter in the Nico Giraldi film series starring Tomas Milian.

== Plot ==
Rome, Italy in the early 1980s. Nico Giraldi (Tomas Milian) is transformed after many other adventures, in a trucker to sneak in a band that performs raids at the expense of TIR.

== Cast ==
- Tomas Milian as Nico Giraldi
- Viola Valentino as Anna Danti
- Bombolo as Venticello
- Olimpia Di Nardo as Angela
- Paco Fabrini as Rocky Giraldi
- Marcello Martana as Commissioner Trentini
- Tony Kendall as Tarquini
- Gabriella Giorgelli as Bocconotti Cinzia
- Giorgio Trestini as Andrea Carboni
- Adriana Russo as Miss Carboni
- Marina Hedman as Woman at the confessional
- Ennio Antonelli as Trainer
- Enzo Andronico as Receiver of stolen goods
- Andrea Aureli as Mr. Mariotti

== See also ==
- List of Italian films of 1982
