= Maria Rosaria Omaggio =

Italian actress and writer (1954–2024)

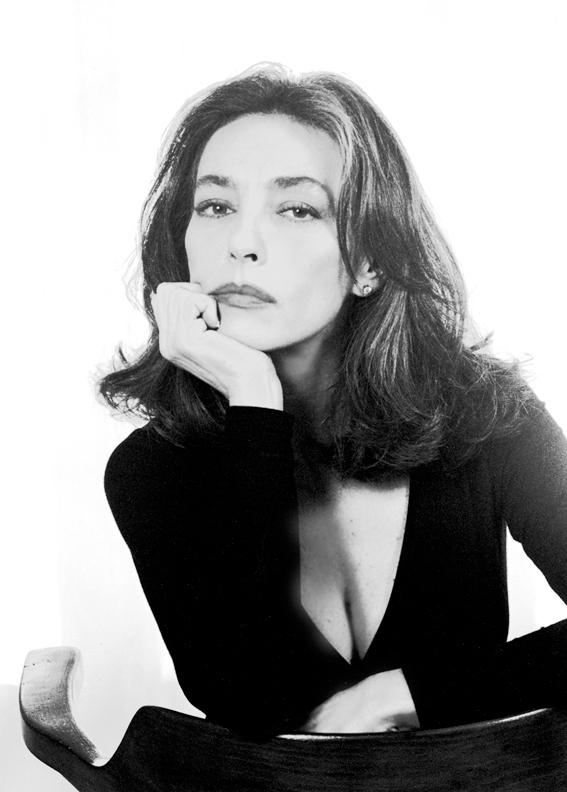
- Born: 11 January 1954; Rome, Italy
- Died: 30 June 2024 (aged 70); Rome, Italy
- Occupations: Actress; writer
- Years active: 1973–2024
- Spouse: Salvatore Vanacore

Maria Rosaria Omaggio (Italian: [maˈriːa roˈzaːrja oˈmaddʒo]; 11 January 1954 – 30 June 2024) was an Italian actress and writer.

== Early life and career ==
Born in Rome, Maria Rosaria Omaggio debuted in 1973 in the Italian show Canzonissima. In 1976 she made her film debut with two poliziotteschi alongside Tomas Milian, The Tough Ones and The Cop in Blue Jeans, and later starred in numerous films and TV series. She was also active on stage, and in 2011 celebrated her 25th year in theater with the recital Omaggio a voi. One of her latest films is Walesa: Man of Hope (2013), directed by Andrzej Wajda, where she stars as Oriana Fallaci.

== Personal life and death ==
Omaggio was married once and had no children. She considered herself Roman Catholic.

Omaggio died on 30 June 2024, at the age of 70. She was a goodwill ambassador for UNICEF.

== Selected filmography ==
- The Tough Ones (1976)
- The Cop in Blue Jeans (1976)
- My Father's Private Secretary (1976)
- La lozana andaluza (1976)
- La malavita attacca... la polizia risponde! (1977)
- El virgo de Visanteta (1979)
- Visanteta, estáte quieta (1979)
- Los locos vecinos del 2º (1980)
- Nightmare City (1980)
- Culo e camicia (1981)
- The Adventures of Hercules (1985)
- It Was a Dark and Stormy Night (1985)
- Rimini Rimini - Un anno dopo (1988)
- The Museum of Wonders (2010)
- Walesa: Man of Hope (2013)
- Sabato, domenica e lunedì (2021)
