= The Tough Ones (1976 film) =

1976 film by Umberto Lenzi

- Italian theatrical poster
- Directed by: Umberto Lenzi
- Screenplay by: Dardano Sacchetti
- Story by: Umberto Lenzi
- Produced by: Mino Loy; Luciano Martino
- Starring: Maurizio Merli; Arthur Kennedy; Giampiero Albertini; Ivan Rassimov; Biagio Pelligra; Aldo Barberito; Stefano Patrizi; Luciano Pigozzi; Maria Rosaria Omaggio; Tomas Milian
- Cinematography: Federico Zanni
- Edited by: Daniele Alabiso
- Music by: Franco Micalizzi
- Production companies: Dania Film; Medusa Distribuzione; National Cinematografica
- Distributed by: Medusa Distribuzione
- Release date: 25 February 1976 (Italy)
- Running time: 95 minutes
- Country: Italy
- Language: Italian
- Box office: ₤1.617 billion

The Tough Ones, also known as Rome; Armed to the Teeth (Italian: Roma a mano armata; lit. 'Rome at Gunpoint'), is a 1976 Italian poliziottesco film directed by Umberto Lenzi and starring Maurizio Merli, Tomas Milian, Arthur Kennedy, Giampiero Albertini, Maria Rosaria Omaggio, Ivan Rassimov and Biagio Pelligra. Its multi-threaded story sees Inspector Leonardo Tanzi (Merli) facing an ensemble of Roman criminals, most of whom are connected to Ferrender, the elusive French crime boss he is after. Among them are bank robber Savelli (Pelligra), Tony the pimp (Rassimov) and Moretto (Milian), an embittered hunchback who proves most dangerous of all.

The Tough Ones emulates the formula of Violent Rome, another film starring Merli that had been a hit for rival producer Edmondo Amati, although it is widely considered to be the superior film. It was followed by The Cynic, the Rat and the Fist and the spinoff Brothers Till We Die. The film was retitled Brutal Justice for its original U.S. theatrical run.

== Plot ==
Inspector Leonardo Tanzi, the head of the anti-gang squad of the Roman branch of the Italian State Police, is pursuing Emmanuel Dominique Ferrender, a French gangster who holds a monopoly on criminal activity within Rome. A raid at a casino that Ferrender is reported to operate proves fruitless until Savelli, a one-armed criminal with ties to Ferrender, walks by the establishment. Tanzi and his partner, Inspector Francesco Caputo, arrest Savelli but are forced to release him without charge; he later kills a guard during a robbery at a horse betting agency.

To find Savelli, Tanzi and another colleague, Poliani, question Savelli's hunchbacked brother-in-law Vincenzo Moretto during his work at a slaughterhouse, but he refuses to cooperate. To arrest him, Tanzi plants drugs in Moretto's Porsche, allowing him and Poliani to interrogate him, where he still refuses to answer their questions. While using the bathroom, Moretto cuts his wrist using his watch's armband, requiring him to be hospitalized; fearing a public scandal concerning police brutality, Vice-Commissioner Ruini has Moretto released without charge and transfers Tanzi to the licenses and permits department.

Three of Moretto's friends avenge him by kidnapping Tanzi's girlfriend Anna, a juvenile court magistrate, and taking her to a junkyard, where they intimidate her by pretending to leave her to be crushed to death by the machinery and give her a bullet to present to Tanzi as a warning. Traumatized, Anna is unable to identify the culprits to Tazni, but he realizes Moretto's involvement due to the bullet and confronts him, ordering him to swallow the bullet in a show of force. Sometime later, Tanzi helps Caputo exhume a decaying body found in Castelfusano, which he suspects is connected to Ferrender.

Maria Assante, the widow of a deceased colleague of Tanzi's, asks him to investigate the whereabouts of her teenage daughter Marta, who has fallen into an abusive relationship with drug dealer Tony Parenzo. When Tanzi attempts to confront Tony in his apartment, he attempts to escape with Marta, who is too sick to comply, forcing him to kill her with an overdose of heroin; Tanzi gives chase, but Tony escapes after taking hostages. Having recovered from her ordeal and disillusioned with her career, Anna decides to temporarily live in Milan with relatives, which Tanzi agrees may be beneficial for their relationship. While helping her move out, Tanzi notices Tony on the street and savagely beats him. To avoid further punishment, Tony attempts to convey key information about Ferrender, but he is shot dead by Moretto from a car driven by his friend Albino; they drive away just as Caputo and Anna arrive. When Albino asks Moretto why he did not kill Tanzi, he reveals that he intends to kill him in a confrontation by using the bullet he was forced to swallow.

Tanzi threatens to resign from the force when Ruini insinuates that he may have been Tony's killer, but they are interrupted when Savelli and two of Moretto's friends hold up a bank. Tanzi and a marksman infiltrate the bank through its air conditioning ducts and kill the gangsters without harming the hostages. Impressed by Tanzi, Ruini allows him to pursue Moretto, who commandeers an ambulance to escape the police, killing several bystanders in the process. Anna identifies her kidnappers as Savelli's accomplices and Albino, and that the junkyard they took her to was at the edge of town. Tanzi soon discovers that the junkyard was once owned by Ferdinando Gerace, a businessman he had previously argued with over a lost license and encountered during his search for Marta, determining that he is a middleman between Ferrender and Moretto's gang.

Meeting at Gerace's warehouse, Moretto and Albino divide the ransom from a prominent jeweller they had kidnapped with Gerace and his men. Tanzi, Caputo and Poliani arrest Gerace; when Tanzi confronts Albino, he is disarmed and beaten by Moretto, who gloats that the corpse found in Castelfusano was that of Ferrender, whom he had killed several weeks prior. Moretto kills Caputo with Tanzi's sidearm and flees, prompting Tanzi to use Caputo's gun to shoot him dead.

== Cast ==
- Maurizio Merli as Inspector Leonardo Tanzi
- Tomas Milian as Vincenzo Moretto, "The Hunchback"
- Arthur Kennedy as Vice-Commissioner Ruini
- Giampiero Albertini as Inspector Francesco Caputo
- Maria Rosaria Omaggio as Anna
- Ivan Rassimov as Tony Parenzo
- Biagio Pelligra as Savelli
- Aldo Barberito as Detective Poliani
- Stefano Patrizi as Stefano
- Luciano Catenacci as Ferdinando Gerace
- Luciano Pigozzi as Savelli's Henchman

As was frequently the case for Italian genre films, much of the cast was dubbed even on the Italian track. Merli was voiced by Pino Locchi, Milian by Ferruccio Amendola, Omaggio by Vittoria Febbi and Rassimov by Cesare Barbetti.

== Production ==
According to director Umberto Lenzi, production initially offered him a spy story set in the popular Roman district of Trastevere, titled Roma ha un segreto (lit. 'Rome Has a Secret'), but he felt that it made no sense. He asked to make a film about contemporary urban violence instead and, within a week, a new script as improvised. The Hunchback was modeled after a butcher Lenzi had encountered in his childhood, while Ferrender was inspired by Jacques Berenguer, a French mobster who operated in Rome at the time. After Manhunt in the City, this was the second of many collaborations between Lenzi and writer Dardano Sacchetti, who was primarily known for his workrate. Lenzi found The Tough Ones to be their best, although he was still unimpressed overall, as Sachetti's output often lacked structure and required rewrites. The result bears strong similarities with Violent Rome, Merli's first hit poliziesco released just months before, including a robbery at a horse betting parlor. Producer Luciano Martino also wanted to bring back Tomas Milian, his leading man on Lenzi's Almost Human and Syndicate Sadists, but the latter demanded too much money. He thus reached a compromise, in which he would book the Cuban for fewer days and bill him only as a special guest star. However, Milian's name was later added in a larger font to the billboards promoting the film.

Filming took place at the end of 1975, under the working title Roma vuole giustizia (lit. 'Rome Wants Justice'). The bank robbery takes place at the very same Aprilia branch as the one used for a similar scene in Violent Rome. The foot chase between Tanzi and Tony spans various rooftops of the historic Ponte and Parione districts. The bulk of the motor chases were filmed without a permit, amidst the general traffic, although the crashes were done in closed off areas. The shots of Milian inside the ambulance were captured whilst actually driving. At one point, Lenzi realized that two real police cars had joined the chase and had to drop by the police station to sort out the matter. Some vehicular footage is recycled from Martino's earlier production The Violent Professionals. Although Milian originally wanted Merli to play his counterpart, the two did not get along, which was compounded by some stiff kicks delivered by Merli during the filming of their final showdown.

== Release ==
Around the film's Italian release, it was referred to in English as Rome; Armed to the Teeth, an idiomatic translation of the original title. Thereafter, it was exported under the title of The Tough Ones.

=== Italy ===
Roma a mano armata was released on February 25, 1976 in Italy, where it was distributed by Medusa Distribuzione. It was a sizeable success, grossing ITL1,617 billion domestically.

=== United States ===
In the U.S., the film's rights went to Terry Levene's Aquarius Releasing, a grindhouse distributor with a history of tempering with their foreign acquisitions to pass them as American. Aquarius went as far as informing the trade press that it had wrapped up principal photography on the film, now renamed Brutal Justice, in April 1977. It was then credited to Simon Nuchtern, a director and post-production supervisor who often tweaked movies for New York-based exploitation firms. In reality, Nuchtern had only filmed a few establishing shots throughout the New York area, which superficially Americanized the Italian locations. The final poster omitted Nuchtern's name and used Anglicized monikers that stuck fairly close to the original Italian credits, with Umberto Lenzi identified as Bert Lenzi and Maurizio Merli as Mike Merli.

Brutal Justice opened in select cities on 12 April 1978. Los Angeles was initially announced among these, and Crown International Pictures was to have acted as subdistributor in the market. However there is no trace of such a release. In late 1978, Aquarius named Scope III Film Distribution as the movie's new L.A. subdistributor, but it seems to have stuck to North and Central California. Aquarius did launch Brutal Justice in New York City on 2 March 1979.

== Reception ==
=== Contemporary ===
Amfi., Rome-based critic for U.S. trade magazine Variety, noted that "Milian stands out with his flamboyant portrayal of the Hunchback though his own charm makes it hard to believe he's really that unsavory a character." He found Merli "adequately tough" and Omaggio "convicing as the social worker", but deemed that their romance "never quiet rings true due to her gentle and his violent approach to life." Of the technical merits, he wrote: "Lenzi keeps his action, cast and camera moving at a fast clip. Pic has good music." Cer. of Rome daily Il Messaggero deemed that "to be honest, unlike other films on the same subject, it stands out both for narrative content and for a remarkable degree of showmanship [...] While you may not share the story's ideological viewpoint, which requires a certain contempt for the rule of law in the fight against crime, the film's good form must still be recognized". D.G. of L'Unità, a far left paper, countered: "Roma a mano armata presents itself as an appendix to Violent Rome (there is, however, no chronological connection), the cop film that best knew how to convey, within its despicable genre, a blatantly fascistic ideology. [It] is, if that's possible, worse than its predecessor, because it does not exalt the violence of the 'executioners,' but rather that of the 'offenders,' while subtly aiming for the same result."

=== Retrospective ===
Donald Guarisco of AllMovie wrote that it "is a memorably outrageous example of the Italian crime film. From the opening frames, it digs its hooks into the viewer and doesn't let go". He noted that the plot was "really an excuse for a string of breathless comic-book displays of crime and action" carried by "Lenzi's energetic and stylish direction" and "a pair of intense, charismatic performances that live up to the material's larger than life style". Todd Garbarini of Cinema Retro praised some "crazy" chases, but criticized Merli's "unintentionally funny" reliance on slaps during fight scenes. He also found fault with the narrative, as action scenes are inserted "for no better reason than they are there", while Rassimov's story arc "comes out of nowhere".

The film was selected for inclusion in the British Film Institute's 2011 book 100 Cult Films by Ernest Mathijs and Xavier Mendik.

== Narrative universe ==
Both Merli and Milian were brought back for the 1977 sequel The Cynic, the Rat and the Fist. While Merli still played Tanzi, Milian portrayed a new, different looking antagonist nicknamed "The Chinaman". Later that year, however, Milian revived The Hunchback in Brothers Till We Die, a crossover film in which that character is retconned as the twin of "Trash" (Italian: Er Monnezza), the hero of his other 1976 hit Free Hand for a Tough Cop.

== Post-release ==
=== Re-release as Assault with a Deadly Weapon (1982) ===
In 1982, Aquarius released yet another cut of the film under the title Assault with a Deadly Weapon. It excises the opening nine minutes, and boasts entirely made-up names for director "Walter Gaines", star "Richard Holliday" and others. The new poster and title sequence draw heavily from art made by Patrick Woodroffe for Corgi's 1975 paperback of Ernest Tidyman's novel Line of Duty. The first screenings on record took place in and around New York City on 18 June 1982. It generated about $300,000 from 45 screens in its debut New York week. That version was released by U.S.A. Home Video in the week of 23 March 1986, as part of their hosted collection Sybil Danning's Adventure Video.

=== Theatrical revival and Blu-ray remaster (2019) ===
In 2019, Grindhouse Releasing brought the film back to U.S. theaters in its intended form as The Tough Ones, at Alamo Drafthouses and other locations. The film's earliest screening on record during this run was in Boston on 6 April 2019. It was shown in Los Angeles on 12 July, and in the New York metro on 22 July.

On 9 July 2019, Grindhouse released a three-disc package featuring, across two Blu-rays, the original cut pressed from a new 4K scan, Callum Waddell's feature documentary All Eyes on Lenzi: The Life and Times of the Exploitation Titan and a feature-length interview with Tomas Milian, plus a CD of Franco Micalizzi's newly remastered soundtrack, and a commemorative bullet pen with early copies.

=== Special screenings ===
In 2019, Roma a mano armata was screened as part of a Lenzi tribute coinciding with Calibro 70, a festival dedicated to 1970s crime cinema by the director's alma mater, Rome's CSC, under the patronage of the National Cinematheque and State Police. The film was shown at the 2024 San Sebastián Film Festival during a retrospective entitled Violent Italy: Italian Crime Films. In 2026, the film was screened by the French Cinematheque as part of Italie, années de plomb (lit. 'Italy, Years of Lead'), a retrospective held in conjunction with the release of the book Rosso sangue : Le cinéma italien des années de plomb (lit. 'Rosso Sangue: Italian Cinema in the Years of Lead') by Cinematheque president and film critic Jean-François Rauger.

== See also ==
- List of Italian films of 1976
