= Corrado Solari =

Italian actor (1948–2026)

Corrado Solari (21 July 1948 – 9 June 2026) was an Italian actor.

== Life and career ==
Solari was born in Rimini on 21 July 1948. His career spanned five decades, after beginning on the stage, he entered cinema in the early 1970s, making his debut in Pietro Germi's A Pocketful of Chestnuts. He became a familiar face in Italian poliziotteschi films, often portraying tough antagonists and supporting roles in films such as The Tough Ones (1976), and Destruction Force (1977).

He also worked in television, appearing in television programs including Elisa di Rivombrosa, Don Matteo, Distretto di Polizia, I Cesaroni, Rocco Schiavone, and Vita da Carlo.

Solari died in Rome on 9 June 2026, at the age of 77.
