= Guido Alberti =

Italian actor (1909–1996)

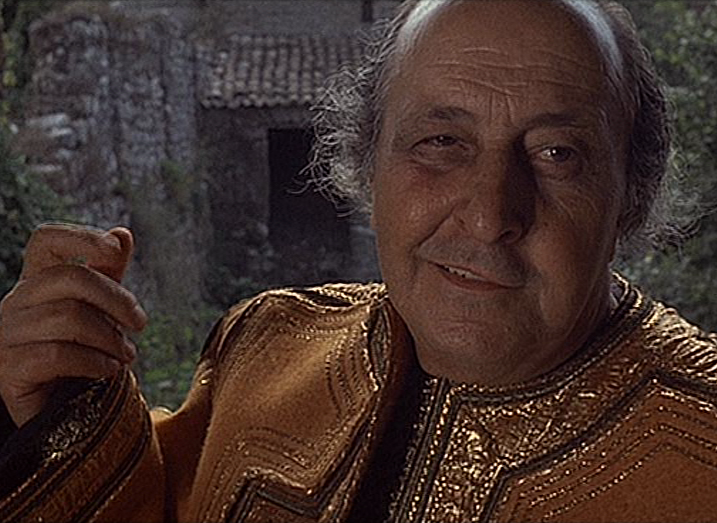
- Alberti in The Decameron, 1971
- Born: Guido Renato Vittorio Alberti; 20 April 1909; Benevento, Italy
- Died: 3 August 1996 (aged 87); Rome, Italy
- Occupation: Actor
- Years active: 1963–1993

Guido Alberti (20 April 1909 – 3 August 1996) was an Italian film actor. He appeared in 60 films between 1963 and 1993.

== Selected filmography ==
- Wild Love (1956) – Sor Alberto (uncredited)
- 8½ (1963) – Pace, il produttore
- The Executioner (1963) – Director de la prisión
- Hands Over the City (1963) – Maglione
- Aimez-vous les femmes ? (1964) – Mr. Khouroulis
- Le Grain de sable (1964) – Rudolf Kubler
- Angélique, Marquise des Anges (1964) – Le grand Mathieu (uncredited)
- Marvelous Angelique (1965) – Le grand Mathieu (uncredited)
- La fuga (1965) – Il padre di Piera
- Su e giù (1965) – Il commendatore Persici (segment "Colpo da leoni, Il")
- The Camp Followers (1965) – Gambardelli
- Casanova 70 (1965) – Il monsignore
- Marco the Magnificent (1965) – Pope Gregory X
- The Dreamer (1965) – Uncle Marco
- Juliet of the Spirits (1965) – Player (uncredited)
- Shoot Loud, Louder... I Don't Understand (1966) – Pasquale Cimmaruta
- Un choix d'assassins (1967) – Domenico
- OSS 117 – Double Agent (1968) – Faruk Melik – il braccio destro del Maggiore
- The Vatican Affair (1968) – Il cardinale Masoli – il sovrintentdente del tesoro vaticano
- A Fine Pair (1968) – Uncle Camillo Marini
- La prova generale (1968)
- Youth March (1969) – Avv. Milazzo
- Le regine (1970)
- Lady Caliph (1970) – Il monsignore
- The Decameron (1971) – Musciatto, wealthy merchant
- The Fifth Cord (1971) – Traversi
- Ten Days' Wonder (1971) – Ludovic Van Horn – le frère et régisseur de Théo
- What? (1972) – Priest
- Sans sommation (1973) – (uncredited)
- The Off-Road Girl (1973) – Monsignor Vittorio Baudana
- Tony Arzenta (1973) – Don Mariano
- Deux hommes dans la ville (1973) – The owner of the printing shop
- The Bloody Hands of the Law (1973) – Prof. Palmieri
- Spasmo (1974) – Malcolm
- Violins at the Ball (1974) – Le producteur italien
- Silence the Witness (1974) – Il questore
- Almost Human (1974) – Mr. Porrino – Marilù's father
- La sensualità è... un attimo di vita (1975)
- Syndicate Sadists (1975) – Owner of Billiard Salon
- Hallucination Strip (1975) – Il capo della polizia
- Napoli violenta (1976) – Superintendent
- The Black Corsair (1976) – Governor of Ribeira
- The Cynic, the Rat and the Fist (1977) – Uncle
- Bobby Deerfield (1977) – Priest in the Garden
- L'Affaire Suisse (1978) – Anione
- Contraband (1980) – Don Morrone
- The Mafia Triangle (1981) – Chief of Police
- La guérilléra (1982) – Joao Bernardo
- Moon in the Gutter (1983) – Le gardien de la cathédrale
- A Strange Passion (1984) – Valerio – l'ami de Piacchi
- Saving Grace (1986) – Cardinal Augusto Morante
- Love and Fear (1988) – Baretti
- Alcune signore per bene (1990) – Tarlazzi
- The Yes Man (1991) – Carlo Sperati
- Donne in un giorno di festa (1993) – Nonno Anselmo
