= Tomas Milian =

Cuban-Italian-American actor (1933–2017)

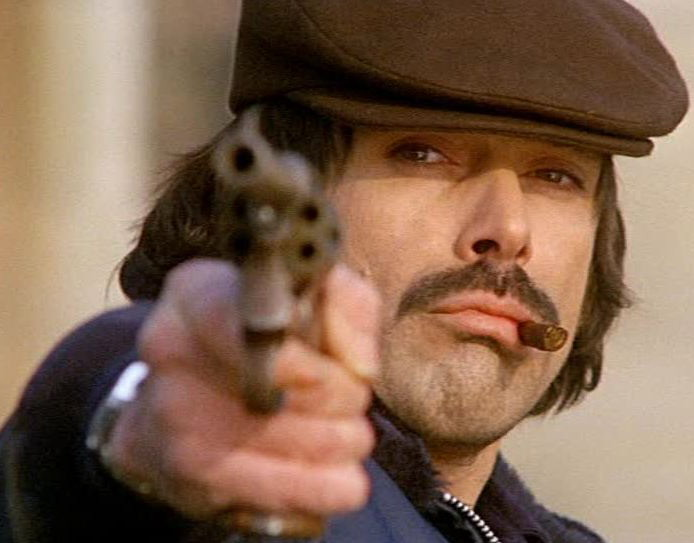
- Milian in Emergency Squad (1974)
- Born: Tomás Quintín Rodríguez-Varona Milián Salinas De La Fé y Álvarez De La Campa; March 3, 1933; Havana, Cuba
- Died: March 22, 2017 (aged 84); Miami, Florida, U.S.
- Citizenship: Cuba; United States (after 1955); Italy (after 1969)
- Education: Actors Studio
- Occupations: Actor, musician
- Years active: 1957–2017
- Spouse: Margherita Valetti (m. 1964; died 2012)
- Children: 1
- Awards: See below
- Website: tomasmilian.it

Tomás Quintín Rodríguez-Varona Milián Salinas de la Fé y Álvarez de la Campa (March 3, 1933 – March 22, 2017) was a Cuban-born actor and musician, who worked extensively in American and Italian films. Born in Havana and educated at the Actors Studio in New York, Milian began his acting career in the United States before moving to Italy in the late 1950s, where he became best known for the emotional intensity and humor he brought to starring roles in genre films.

Throughout the late-1960s and early-1970s, Milian established himself as a dynamic leading actor in a series of Spaghetti Western films, most notably The Big Gundown (1966), Django Kill... If You Live, Shoot! (1967), as well as Sergio Corbucci's parody of the genre The White, the Yellow, and the Black (1975), and Dennis Hopper's Western-influenced arthouse film The Last Movie (1971).

After the decline of Spaghetti Westerns, Milian transitioned to poliziottesco films. He was acclaimed as a psychotic killer in Almost Human (1974), and appeared in Emergency Squad (1974), The Tough Ones (1976) and The Cynic, the Rat and the Fist (1977). Returning to the United States in 1985, Milian performed supporting roles in movies like JFK (1991), Amistad (1997), Traffic (2000), and The Lost City (2005), and the television series Oz (1997).

== Early life and education ==
Milián was born in the Cotorro municipality of Havana in 1933. His father, also named Tomás, was a General in the Machado regime. After the Revolt of the Sergeants and the start of the Fulgencio Batista's dictatorship, the elder Tomás was arrested, jailed, and later committed suicide on New Year's Eve 1946 in the presence of his son.

In 1955, after seeing the film East of Eden, Milián decided to leave Cuba and pursue his wishes of being an actor. He moved to the United States, enrolling in the University of Miami. After two years, he moved to New York City to study method acting at the Actors Studio, as a student of Lee Strasberg. Around that time, he became an American citizen.

== Acting career ==
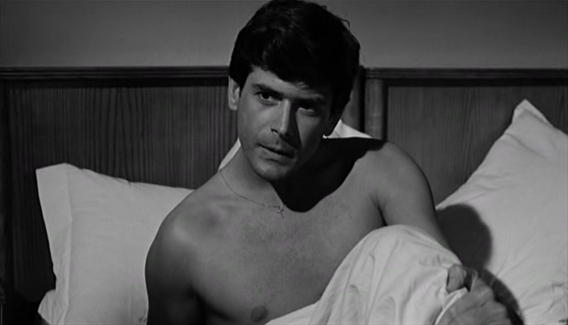
Milian in Silver Spoon Set (1960)

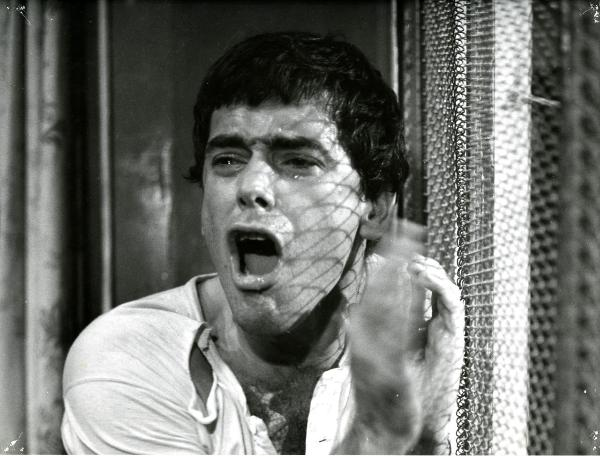
Milian in Day by Day, Desperately (1961).

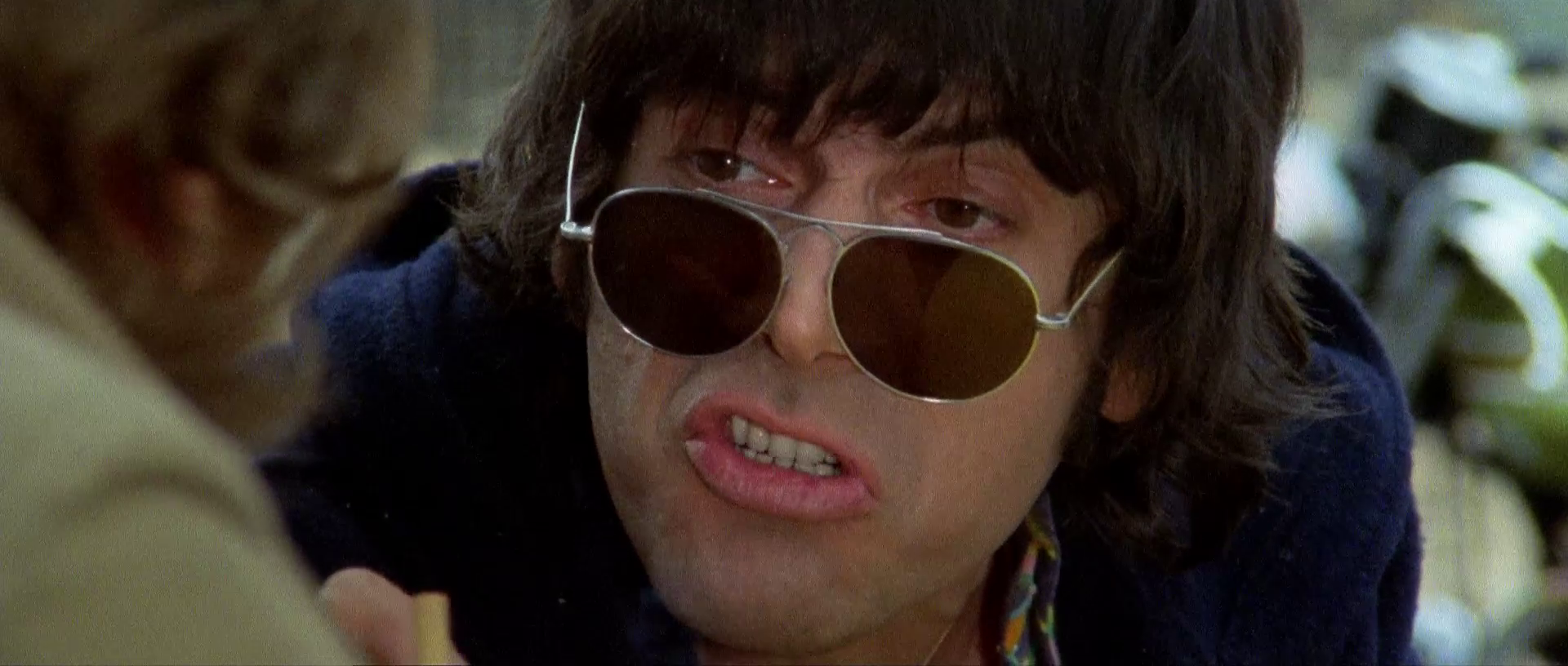
Milian in Almost Human (1974).

After starting a career in the United States, Milian went to Italy in 1958 to take part in a theatre festival in Spoleto. In Italy, he was discovered by director Mauro Bolognini and appeared in supporting roles in several drama films during the late 1950s and early 1960s.

He eventually decided to relocate to Italy, where he lived for over 25 years, becoming a very successful performer. His first film part in Italy was in the 1959 picture La notte brava. Although his voice was usually dubbed due to his accent, Milián performed his lines in Italian (or in English, depending on the film). He initially starred in arthouse movies and worked with directors such as Mauro Bolognini, Luchino Visconti, and Pier Paolo Pasolini.

After five years of making what he deemed "intellectual" movies, Milián was unhappy with his contract with producer Franco Cristaldi and thought of going back to the United States. Needing money to start over, he took the opportunity to star as a bandit in a Spaghetti Western called The Bounty Killer. The film boosted his career, and ultimately resulted in his staying in Italy. He became a star of the Spaghetti Western genre, where he often played Mexican bandits or revolutionaries, roles in which he spoke in his real voice. He starred in The Ugly Ones (1966), The Big Gundown (1966), Django Kill... If You Live, Shoot! (1967), Face to Face (1967), Run, Man, Run (1968), Death Sentence (1968), Tepepa (1969), Compañeros (1970), Sonny and Jed (1972), Life Is Tough, Eh Providence? (1972) and Four of the Apocalypse (1975).

In 1969, he became a naturalized Italian citizen.

As the Spaghetti Westerns dwindled, Milián remained a star in many genre films, playing both villains and heroes in various polizieschi movies. He starred with Barbara Bouchet in the giallo Don't Torture a Duckling. In addition to his role in Almost Human (1974) and appearances in Emergency Squad (1974), The Tough Ones (1976) and The Cynic, the Rat and the Fist (1977), he also appeared in two film series - Bruno Corbucci's Nico Giraldi series (1976-1984, beginning with The Cop in Blue Jeans) and Umberto Lenzi's Er Monnezza films (1976-1980, beginning with Free Hand for a Tough Cop). His other films during this period include the giallo Don't Torture a Duckling (1972) and the non-genre films The Last Movie (1971), Luna (1979), Identification of a Woman (1982) and Monsignor (1982).

He later turned to comedy, playing the recurrent characters of petty thief Monnezza and Serpico-like police officer Nico Giraldi in a variety of crime-comedy pictures. Although his voice was dubbed most of the time by Ferruccio Amendola, Milián wrote his own lines in Roman slang. Milián's inventive use of romanesco (Roman dialect) made him a cult performer in Italy. Bruno Corbucci, the director of many of these films commented, "At the cinemas as soon as Tomás Milián appeared on the screen, when he made a wisecrack and in the heaviest situations, then it was a pandemonium, it was like being at the stadium." As Milián used similar makeups and accents in portraying both characters, Monnezza and Nico were occasionally confused by Italian audiences, who sometimes referred erroneously to them both as Monnezza, or Er Monnezza (Da trash in Roman slang ), and still closely associate Milián with these performances.

Milián also appeared in non-genre pictures, such as Bernardo Bertolucci's La Luna, for which he won a Nastro d'Argento for Best supporting Actor, and Michelangelo Antonioni's Identification of a Woman.

As he grew older, Milián decided to go back to the United States. He appeared in Sydney Pollack's Havana, Steven Spielberg's Amistad, Steven Soderbergh's Traffic as well as Andy García's The Lost City, about Revolutionary Cuba. He has also played many roles on stage. In 2005, he portrayed Generalisimo Rafael Leonidas Trujillo Molina in the film version of Mario Vargas Llosa's novel The Feast of the Goat.

== Musical career ==
Milián, in addition to his acting career, was also an accomplished musician. In 1966, he founded the Tomas Milian Group with Ray Lovelock (vocals), Maurizio Luzi (guitar), Aldo "Fido" Colangelo (keyboard, vocals), Mario Piccinno (drums), Romeo Piccinno (guitar, vocals), and Peppe Colella (bass). He also wrote and performed the theme songs to several of his films.

== Personal life ==
Milian was openly bisexual. In a 2014 interview, he stated the first person he came out to was Claudia Cardinale. He married actress Margherita "Rita" Valletti with whom he had a son, Tomaso.

=== Death ===
Milian was found dead from a stroke at his home in Miami on March 22, 2017.

On October 11, 2017, he received the Leone in Memoriam award at the 7º Almería Western Film Festival. It was picked up by his friend Luis Santeiro.

== Filmography ==
=== Film ===
Tomas Milian film credits
Year	Title	Role	Director	Notes	Ref.
1959	Bad Girls Don't Cry	Moretto	Mauro Bolognini	Italian: La notte brava	
1960	Il bell'Antonio	Edoardo	Mauro Bolognini		
1960	Silver Spoon Set	Alberto De Matteis	Francesco Maselli	Italian: I Delfini	
1961	The Mishap	Thomas Plemian	Alberto Lattuada	Italian: L'imprevisto	
1961	A Day for Lionhearts	Gino Migliacci	Nanni Loy	Italian: Un giorno da leoni	
1961	Day by Day, Desperately	Dario Dominici	Alfredo Giannetti	Italian: Giorno per giorno disperatamente	
1962	Boccaccio '70	Conte Ottavio	Luchino Visconti		
1962	Disorder	Bruno	Franco Brusati	Italian: Il disordine	
1962	La banda Casaroli	Gabriele Ingenis	Florestano Vancini		
1963	Ro.Go.Pa.G.	Centurione	Pier Paolo Pasolini	Segment: "La ricotta"	
1963	Mad Sea	Efsio	Renato Castellani	Italian: Mare matto	
1965	I Kill, You Kill	Lorenzo Berti	Gianni Puccini	Italian: Io uccido, tu uccidi; Segment: "Il Plenilunio"	
1965	Time of Indifference	Michele	Francesco Maselli	Italian: Gli indifferenti	
1965	The Camp Followers	Lt. Gaetano Martino	Valerio Zurlini	Italian: Le soldatesse	
1965	The Agony and the Ecstasy	Raphael	Carol Reed		
1965	I soldi	Bob	Gianni Puccini		
1966	Madamigella di Maupin	Chevalier d'Albert	Mauro Bolognini		
1966	The Ugly Ones	José Gómez	Eugenio Martin	Spanish: El precio de un hombre	
1967	The Big Gundown	Cuchillo Sanchez	Sergio Sollima	Italian: La resa dei conti	
1967	Face to Face	Beau Bennet	Sergio Sollima		
1967	Django Kill... If You Live, Shoot!	The Stranger	Giulio Questi	Italian: Faccia a faccia	
1968	Bandits in Milan	Comissario Walter Basevi	Carlo Lizzani	Italian: Banditi a Milano	
1968	Death Sentence	O'Hara	Mario Lanfranchi	Italian: Sentenza di morte	
1968	Run, Man, Run!	Cuchillo Sanchez	Sergio Sollima	Italian: Corri uomo corri	
1968	A Fine Pair	Roger	Francesco Maselli	Italian: Ruba al prossimo tuo	
1969	Tepepa	Jesus Maria "Tepepa" Moran	Giulio Petroni	Spanish: Tepepa... Viva La Revolución	
1969	The Conspiracy of Torture	Olimpio Calvetti	Lucio Fulci	Italian: Beatrice Cenci	
1969	Where Are You Going All Naked?	Manfredo	Pasquale Festa Campanile	Italian: Dove vai tutta nuda?	
1969	The Year of the Cannibals	Emone	Liliana Cavani	Italian: I cannibali	
1970	Compañeros	El Vasco	Sergio Corbucci		
1970	Viva Cangaceiro	Espedito	Giovanni Fago	Originally: O' Cangaçeiro	
1971	The Designated Victim	Stefano Augenti	Maurizio Lucidi	Italian: La vittima designata	
1971	The Last Movie	the Priest	Dennis Hopper		
1972	Ripped Off	the Stranger	Franco Prosperi	Italian: Un uomo dalla pelle dura	
1972	Sonny and Jed	Jed Trigado	Sergio Corbucci	Italian: La banda J. & S. - Cronaca criminale del Far-West	
1972	Don't Torture a Duckling	Andrea Martelli	Lucio Fulci	Italian: Non si sevizia un paperino	
1972	Life Is Tough, Eh Providence?	Provvidenza	Giulio Petroni	Italian: La vita a volte è molto dura, vero Provvidenza?	
1973	Counselor at Crime	Thomas Accardo	Alberto De Martino	Italian: Il consigliori	
1974	Emergency Squad	Tomas Ravelli	Stelvio Massi	Italian: Squadra volante	
1974	Almost Human	Giulio Sacchi	Umberto Lenzi	Italian: Milano odia: la polizia non può sparare	
1975	Silent Action	Rienzi	Sergio Martino	Italian: La polizia accusa: il Servizio Segreto uccide	
1975	Syndicate Sadists	Rambo	Umberto Lenzi	Italian: Il giustiziere sfida la città	
1975	The White, the Yellow, and the Black	Sakura	Sergio Corbucci	Italian: Il bianco, il giallo, il nero	
1975	Four of the Apocalypse	Chaco	Lucio Fulci	Italian: I quattro dell'apocalisse	
1975	Folle à tuer	Thompson	Yves Boisset		
1975	Messalina, Messalina!	Baba	Bruno Corbucci		
1976	Sex with a Smile	Cavaliere Marelli	Sergio Martino	Italian: 40 gradi all'ombra del lenzuolo	
1976	The Tough Ones	Vincenzo Moretto	Umberto Lenzi	Italian: Roma a mano armata	
1976	The Cop in Blue Jeans	Nico Giraldi	Bruno Corbucci	Italian: Squadra antiscippo	
1976	The Twist	The Detective	Claude Chabrol	French: Folies bourgeoises	
1976	Hit Squad	Nico Giraldi	Bruno Corbucci	Italian: Squadra antifurto	
1976	Young, Violent, Dangerous	the Commissioner	Romolo Guerrieri	Italian: Liberi armati pericolosi	
1977	The Cynic, the Rat and the Fist	Luigi Maietto	Umberto Lenzi	Italian: Il cinico, l'infame, il violento	
1977	Free Hand for a Tough Cop	Sergio Marazzi	Umberto Lenzi	Italian: Il trucido e lo sbirro	
1977	Brothers Till We Die	Sergio Marazzi / The Hunchback	Umberto Lenzi	Italian: La banda del gobbo	
1977	Destruction Force	Sergio Marazzi	Stelvio Massi	Originally: La banda del trucido	
1977	Swindle	Nico Giraldi	Bruno Corbucci	Originally: Squadra antitruffa	
1978	Little Italy	Nico Giraldi	Bruno Corbucci	Italian Squadra antimafia	
1979	The Gang That Sold America	Nico Giraldi	Bruno Corbucci	Italian: Squadra antigangsters	
1979	Assassinio sul Tevere	Nico Giraldi	Bruno Corbucci		
1979	La Luna	Giuseppe	Bernardo Bertolucci		
1979	Winter Kills	Frank Mayo	William Richert		
1980	Il lupo e l'agnello	Cuckoo	Francesco Massaro		
1980	Delitto a Porta Romana	Nico Giraldi	Bruno Corbucci		
1981	Manolesta	Gino Quirino	Pasquale Festa Campanile		
1981	Crime at the Chinese Restaurant	Nico Giraldi	Bruno Corbucci	Italian: Delitto al ristorante cinese	
1981	Uno contro l'altro, praticamente amici	Quinto Cecione	Bruno Corbucci		
1982	Delitto sull'autostrada	Nico Giraldi	Bruno Corbucci		
1982	Identification of a Woman	Niccolò	Michelangelo Antonioni	Italian: Identificazione di una donna	
1982	Monsignor	Father Francisco	Frank Perry		
1982	Cat and Dog	Tony Roma	Bruno Corbucci	Italian: Cane e gatto	
1983	Crime in Formula One	Nico Giraldi	Bruno Corbucci	Italian: Delitto in Formula Uno	
1984	Cop in Drag	Nico Giraldi	Bruno Corbucci	Italian: Delitto al Blue Gay	
1985	King David	Akiss	Bruce Beresford		
1986	Salomé	Herod II	Claude d'Anna		
1987	Distant Lights	Bernardo Bernardi	Aurelio Chiesa	Italian: Luci lontane	
1989	Cat Chaser	Andres DeBoya	Abel Ferrara		
1989	Massacre Play	Clem Da Silva	Damiano Damiani	Italian: Gioco al massacro	
1990	Revenge	Cesar	Tony Scott		
1990	Havana	Colonel Menocal	Sydney Pollack		
1991	Money	Robert Zarra	Steven Hilliard Stern		
1991	JFK	Leopoldo	Oliver Stone		
1994	The Cowboy Way	Manny Huerta	Gregg Champion		
1997	Fools Rush In	Tomas Fuentes	Andy Tennant		
1997	Amistad	Ángel Calderón de la Barca y Belgrano	Steven Spielberg		
2000	The Yards	Manuel Sequeira	James Gray		
2000	Traffic	General Arturo Salazar	Steven Soderbergh		
2001	The Hire: Ambush	Passenger	John Frankenheimer	Short	
2002	Washington Heights	Eddie	Alfredo De Villa		
2005	The Lost City	Don Federico Fellove	Andy García		
2005	The Feast of the Goat	Rafael Leonidas Trujillo	Luis Llosa	Spanish: La fiesta del chivo	
2013	Tomas Milian: Acting on Instinct	Himself	Ozzy Inguanzo	Documentary	
2014	Fugly!	Gramps	Alfredo De Villa		

=== Television ===
Tomas Milian television credits
Year	Title	Role	Notes	Ref.
1958	Decoy	Juan Ortega	Episode: "Fiesta at Midnight"	
1959	The Millionaire	Sailor	Episode: "The Louise Benton Story"	
1985, 1987	The Equalizer	Immanuel Pena, Duran	Episodes: "Reign of Terror", "Shadow Play"	
1985	Miami Vice	Octavio Arroyo	Episode: "Bought and Paid For"	
1991	L.A. Law	Joseph Sifuentes	Episode: "The Gods Must Be Lawyers"	
1992	Murder, She Wrote	Enrico Montejano	Episode: "Day of the Dead"	
1992	Frannie's Turn	Joseph Escobar	6 episodes	
1992	ScreenPlay	Ramon Cires	Episode: "Bitter Harvest"	
1997	Oz	Ricardo Alvarez	Episodes: "Visits, Conjugal and Otherwise", "To Your Health"	
2000	Law & Order	Colonel Emilio Pantoya	Episode: "Vaya Con Dios"	

==== TV films and miniseries ====
Tomas Milian television credits
Year	Title	Role	Director	Ref.
1990	Drug Wars: The Camarena Story	Florentino Ventura	Brian Gibson	
1990	Voglia di vivere	Tony	Lodovico Gasparini	
1992	Nails	Pedro Herrara	John Flynn	
1993	Love, Honor & Obey: The Last Mafia Marriage	Joe Profaci	John Patterson	
1993	Marilyn & Bobby: Her Final Affair	Carlo Rossi	Bradford May	
1994	The Burning Season	Darli Alves	John Frankenheimer	
2000	For Love or Country: The Arturo Sandoval Story	Sosa	Joseph Sargent	

== Awards and nominations ==
Institution	Year	Category	Work	Result
Actor Awards	2001	Outstanding Performance by a Cast in a Motion Picture	Traffic	Won
Almería Western Film Festival	2017	Honorary Award	—N/a	Won
Mar del Plata International Film Festival	1965	Best Actor	Time of Indifference	Won
Nastro d'Argento	1980	Best Supporting Actor	La Luna	Won
