= Mean Tricks =

- Directed by: Umberto Lenzi
- Screenplay by: Vittorio M. Tesa; Steven Luotto; Antonio Miglietta
- Story by: Vittorio M. Testa
- Produced by: Ezio Palaggi
- Starring: Charles Napier; Stefano Sabelli; David Warbeck
- Cinematography: Marco Onorato
- Edited by: Alberto Moriani
- Music by: Franco Micalizzi
- Distributed by: Rete Italia; Trinidad Film
- Release date: 17 July 1992
- Country: Italy
- Languages: English; Italian

Mean Tricks (Italian: Hornsby e Rodriguez - Sfida criminale) is a 1992 crime thriller film produced in Italy and directed by Umberto Lenzi. Released in 1992, it starred Charles Napier, David Warbeck and Stefano Sabelli. It was shot between Kinepolis Studios in Rome, Santo Domingo and Miami.

== Plot ==
Hornsby, a recently retired FBI agent (Charles Napier) goes to South America to find his old partner because rumor has it that his old partner has become a criminal. When the former partner is killed, Hornsby alters the crime scene to make it appear that his ex-partner killed the gunman himself. The rest of the movie follows Hornsby as he tries to discover who killed his partner and why.

== Cast ==
- Charles Napier as Brian Hornsby
- Stefano Sabelli as Rodriguez
- Iris Peynado as Candelaria
- David Brandon as Jimmy Gandelman / Cobra
- David Warbeck as Frank Mendoza
- Bettina Giovannini
- Stelio Candelli
- Salvatore Lago
- Italo Clemente
- Marco Felicioli
- Enzo Frattari
- Marco Onorato
- Riccardo Petrazzi
- Elena Wiedermann
- Roberto Ricci
- Marcello Tallone
- Emy Valentino
- Doris Susanna Vonthury
