= Super Seven Calling Cairo =

Superseven chiama Cairo
- Film poster by Renato Casaro
- Directed by: Umberto Lenzi
- Screenplay by: Umberto Lenzi; Piero Pierotti
- Based on: Superseven Calling Cairo by H. Humbert
- Produced by: Fortunato Misiano
- Starring: Roger Browne
- Cinematography: Augusto Tiezzi
- Edited by: Jolanda Benvenuti
- Music by: Angelo Francesco Lavagnino
- Production companies: Romana Film; Prodex Film
- Distributed by: Romana Film
- Release date: 30 December 1965
- Running time: 95 minutes
- Countries: Italy; France
- Language: Italian

Super Seven Calling Cairo (Italian: Superseven chiama Cairo) is a 1965 Italian Eurospy film directed by Umberto Lenzi and adapted from his own novel of the same name written under the pseudonym "H. Humbert". It stars Roger Browne as the titular secret agent opposite Fabienne Dali, Massimo Serato, and Rosalba Neri. Shot mostly in Egypt, the film is heavily inspired by the early James Bond films starring Sean Connery. It is followed by The Spy Who Loved Flowers in which Browne reprises his role as Martin Stevens, and Lenzi returns to write and direct the film.

== Premise ==
Martin Stevens - a British agent known by his codename "Superseven" - is sent to recover a modified radioactive metal disguised as a camera lens, stolen and sold to an unaware civilian by mistake. The trail leads him to Cairo in pursuit of the camera where he learns that Russian spies are also after the same device in the hopes of putting the western powers at a disadvantage while per business as usual, Stevens comes across several people in the field who are not who they seem to claim.

== Cast ==
- Roger Browne as Martin Stevens / Superseven
- Fabienne Dali as Denise
- Massimo Serato as Alex
- Andrea Aureli as Il Levantino (as Andrew Ray)
- Dina De Santis as Tania
- Rosalba Neri as Faddja
- Antonio Gradoli as Yussef (as Anthony Gradwell)
- Stella Monclar as Nietta
- Mino Doro as Il Professore
- Franco Castellani as L'Ispettore Stugel
- Claudio Biava as Hans
- Emilio Messina as Nickols
- Francesco De Leone as Prof. Gabin
- Rosalba Neri as Faddja
- Paolo Bonacelli as Captain Hume
