= The Spy Who Loved Flowers =

- Directed by: Umberto Lenzi
- Written by: Umberto Lenzi
- Produced by: Fortunato Misiano
- Starring: Roger Browne
- Cinematography: Augusto Tiezzi
- Music by: Angelo Francesco Lavagnino; Armando Trovajoli
- Release date: 21 December 1966 (France)
- Running time: 93 minutes
- Countries: Italy; Spain
- Language: Italian

The Spy Who Loved Flowers (Italian: Le spie amano i fiori, also known as Hell Cats) is a 1966 Italian/Spanish co-production science fiction-Eurospy film written and directed by Umberto Lenzi (here credited as "Hubert Humphry"). Set in Paris, Geneva and Athens, it is the sequel to Super Seven Calling Cairo (1965). It starred Roger Browne and Yoko Tani.

In the film, a British secret agent is tasked with assassinating three foreign operatives. Finding himself under surveillance by enemy agents, the agent suspects that there is a traitor in his agency.

== Premise ==
British agent Martin Stevens is assigned to assassinate three foreign operatives who collaborated with a deceased scientist whose weaponized invention the agent himself has recovered. Halfway through the mission, Stevens discovers that the enemy has been targeting him instead and knows his every move, thus developing suspicion that there is a traitor in their midst.

== Cast ==
- Roger Browne as Martin Stevens
- Emma Danieli as Geneviève
- Daniele Vargas as Harriman
- Marino Masé as Dick
- Yoko Tani as Mei Lang
- Sal Borgese as Il Sordo, Harriman's henchman
- Fernando Cebrián as Ahmed Murad
- Tullio Altamura as Greg Danar
- Attilio Dottesio

== Release ==
The Spy Who Loved Flowers was released in France on 21 December 1966 as Des fleurs pour un espion.
