= La malavita attacca... la polizia risponde! =

- Italian film poster for La malavita attacca... la polizia risponde!
- Directed by: Mario Caiano
- Screenplay by: Paolo Barberio; Mario Caiano
- Story by: Paolo Barberio
- Starring: Leonardo Manzella; John Steiner; Maria Rosaria Omaggio; Chris Avram; Ettore Manni
- Cinematography: Pier Luigi Santi
- Edited by: Renato Cinquini
- Music by: Lallo Gori
- Production companies: Capitol International; Jarama Film
- Distributed by: Capitol Film
- Release date: August 24, 1977 (Italy)
- Country: Italy
- Box office: ₤692 million

La malavita attacca... la polizia risponde! (The Criminals Attack, The Police Respond) is a 1977 Italian poliziottesco film directed by Mario Caiano.

== Cast ==
- Leonard Mann: Commissioner Baldi
- John Steiner: Rudy
- Maria Rosaria Omaggio: Laura Olivieri
- Chris Avram: Prof. Salviati aka 'The Prince'
- Ettore Manni: Rampelli
- Liana Trouche: Irene Baldi
- Corrado Gaipa: the Doctor

== Release ==
La malavita attacca... la polizia risponde was distributed in Italy by Capitol Film and released on August 24, 1977. It grossed a total of 692,879,780 Italian lire. It was director Mario Caiano's last film released theatrically.

== Notes ==
=== References ===
- Curti, Roberto (2013). Italian Crime Filmography, 1968-1980. McFarland. ISBN 978-0786469765.
