= Pippo Starnazza =

Italian jazz singer and actor

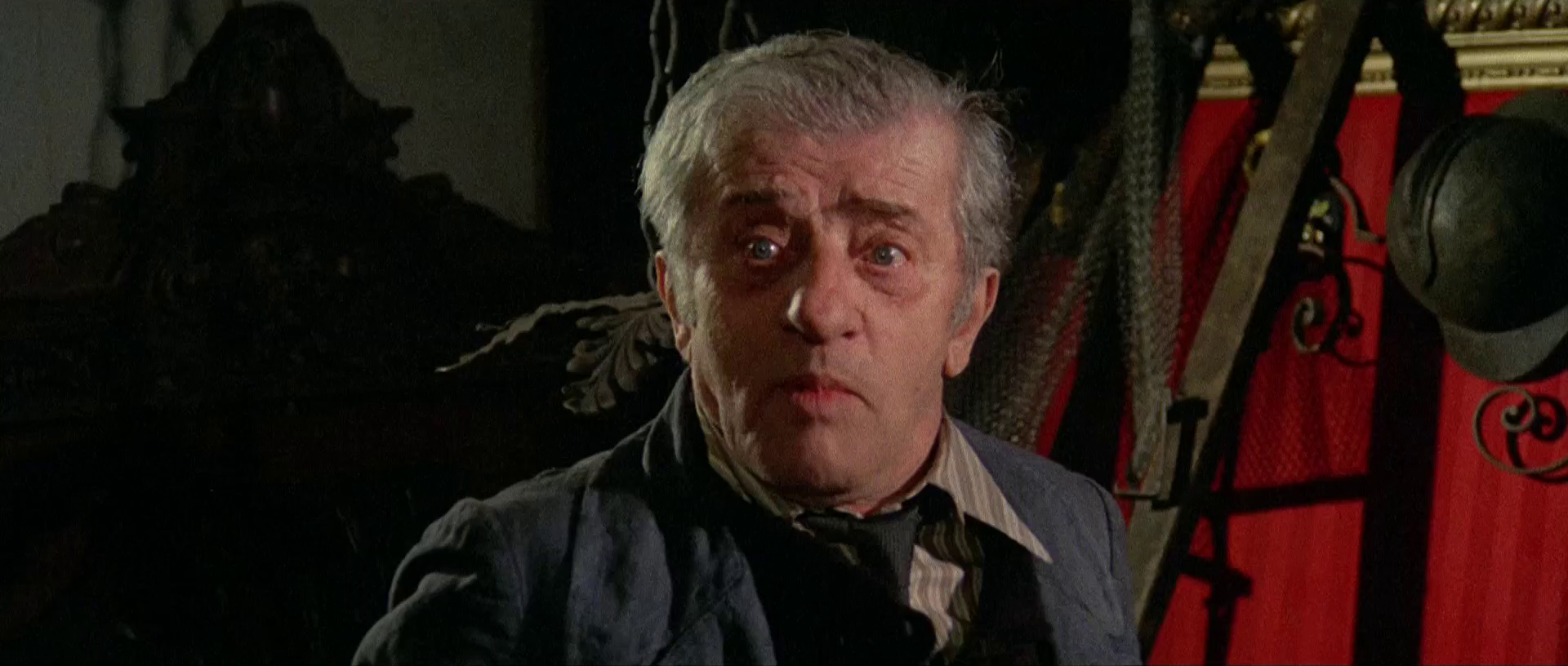
- Pippo Starnazza in Almost Human (1974)

Background information
- Born: Luigi Redaelli; 16 April 1909; Milan, Italy
- Died: 16 July 1975 (aged 66) Milan
- Genres: Jazz
- Occupations: Musician, singer
- Instruments: Drums, vocals
- Years active: 1920s–1970s

Pippo Starnazza (16 April 1909 – 16 July 1975) was an Italian jazz singer and actor.

Born Luigi Redaelli in Milan, he started his career in the 1920s, playing the drums in the De Carli Orchestra at the Orfeo music hall in Milan. After having been part of several other orchestras and jazz bands, in the early 1930s Redaelli started his solo career as a singer, specializing in creating humorous covers of popular American songs in Milanese dialect. In 1939, he adopted his stage name and formed the Quintetto del Delirio (Delirium Quintet), with whom he sang cover songs where the English lyrics were replaced by an onomatopoeic, gibberish language. Beginning the 1960s, he appeared in many films in supporting and character roles. He died of cardiac arrest at the age of sixty-six.
