= Free Hand for a Tough Cop =

- Directed by: Umberto Lenzi
- Written by: Umberto Lenzi; Dardano Sacchetti; Elisa Briganti
- Produced by: Claudio Mancini; Ugo Tucci
- Starring: Tomas Milian; Claudio Cassinelli; Henry Silva
- Cinematography: Luigi Kuveiller
- Edited by: Eugenio Alabiso
- Music by: Bruno Canfora
- Distributed by: Variety Distribution
- Release date: 28 August 1976
- Running time: 90 minutes
- Country: Italy
- Language: Italian
- Box office: ₤509,747 million

Free Hand for a Tough Cop (Italian: Il trucido e lo sbirro / The Numbskull and the Cop), also known as Tough Cop, is an Italian poliziottesco-action film directed in 1976 by Umberto Lenzi and the second entry into the Tanzi/Moretto/Monnezza shared universe. In this movie Tomas Milian plays for the first time Sergio Marazzi a.k.a. "Er Monnezza", a role that he later played several more times, in Lenzi's Brothers Till We Die (1978, a sort of sequel of this movie), in Destruction Force by Stelvio Massi (1977) and, with slight differences, in Uno contro l'altro, praticamente amici by Bruno Corbucci (1980) and in Francesco Massaro's Il lupo e l'agnello (1980).

== Plot ==
Camilla is a little girl suffering with a kidney disorder. Before she can receive her next due treatment she gets kidnapped. The gangsters intend to blackmail her rich father. Commissario Antonio Sarti knows that time is running out on the victim and takes desperate measures. He secretly organises a prison escape for petty crook Sergio Marazzi. By using Marazzi's insider knowledge of the criminal milieu Sarti detects kidnapper's hideout.

== Cast ==
- Tomas Milian as Sergio Marazzi / "Er Monnezza"
- Claudio Cassinelli as Commissioner Antonio Sarti
- Henry Silva as Brescianelli
- Nicoletta Machiavelli as Mara
- Robert Hundar as Mario “The Cynic”
- Biagio Pelligra as Calabrese
- Giuseppe Castellano as Vallelunga
- Ernesto Colli as Roscetto
- Tano Cimarosa as Cravatta
- Dana Ghia as Clara Finzi
- Renato Mori as Commissioner Franchini
- Antonio Casale as Pasquale Tomati / “Er Greve”
- Massimo Bonetti as Pickpocket
- Luciano Rossi as Dealer
- Umberto Raho as Lawyer
- Sara Franchetti as Moretti's Cleaning Lady
- Arturo Dominici as De Rita
- Giovanni Cianfriglia as Camini

== See also ==
- List of Italian films of 1976
