= The Greatest Battle =

1978 Euro War film by Umberto Lenzi

- Italian DVD cover
- Directed by: Umberto Lenzi
- Screenplay by: Umberto Lenzi; Cesare Frugoni
- Story by: Umberto Lenzi
- Produced by: Mino Loy; Luciano Martino
- Starring: Helmut Berger; Samantha Eggar; Giuliano Gemma; John Huston; Stacy Keach; Ray Lovelock; Edwige Fenech; Henry Fonda
- Cinematography: Federico Zanni
- Edited by: Eugenio Alabiso
- Music by: Franco Micalizzi
- Production companies: Dania Film; National Cinematografica
- Distributed by: Titanus (Italy); Constantin Film (West Germany)
- Release date: 1978
- Running time: 90 minutes
- Countries: Italy; West Germany; Yugoslavia

The Greatest Battle (Italian: Il grande attacco, lit. 'The Great Attack', also released as The Biggest Battle and Battle Force) is a 1978 Euro War film co-written and directed by Umberto Lenzi and starring an all-star ensemble cast, including Giuliano Gemma, Helmut Berger, Stacy Keach, Ray Lovelock, Samantha Eggar, Henry Fonda, Ida Galli and John Huston. The Italian-West German-Yugoslavian co-production was produced by Mino Loy and Luciano Martino for Titanus.

The plot centers on a group of German and Allied nationals throughout the early years of World War II, including British commando Captain Martin Scott (Gemma), American General Harold Foster (Fonda) and his son John (Lovelock), Jewish actress Annelise Ackermann (Eggar), war correspondent Sean O'Hara (Huston) and two very different German lieutenants, Kurt Zimmer and Manfred Roland (Berger and Keach). The film climaxes in a recreation of the Battle of the Mareth Line in Tunisia.

== Plot ==
During the 1936 Berlin Olympics, Wehrmacht officer Manfred Roland organizes a dinner with a group of friends and international acquaintances to celebrate the event. The guests include famed German actress Annelise Ackermann, American Brigadier General Harold Foster and Canadian war correspondent Sean O’Hara. Roland and Foster gift each other matching medals reading "In God We Trust" in English and German, respectively, and the group resolve to meet again in four years.

Six years later, Europe is in the midst of World War II, and the once-friends have been forcibly sent separate ways. Annelise has married Roland, and although their union is a happy one, she lives in hiding due to her secret Jewish heritage making her a target of the Nazis' racial policies. In America, Foster's younger son John flunks out of college and subsequently joins the Army like his older brother Ted, despite his father's reservations. Despite their mutual hopes that the war will be over soon, the conflict only escalates and America soon enters the war against Germany. Roland is assigned to deal with partisans in occupied territories, and is subsequently forced to perpetrate summary executions despite his moral objections. Annelise is forced into performing sexual favors by lecherous SS colonel Jurgens who threatens her with arrest over her Jewish heritage. O'Hara, meanwhile, manages to use his old military connections to be assigned to frontline correspondence duty in North Africa.

In Paris, Wehrmacht Lt. Kurt Zimmer begins a transactional relationship with Danielle, a beautiful French woman whose husband was killed by the Germans and prostitutes herself to the occupying personnel to survive. Having requested a transfer to the North African front, Zimmer is given a "farewell" assignment in France to oversee the transportation of a massive train-mounted cannon targeted by guerillas. Meanwhile, John is assigned to commando duty due to his fluent French, and he parachutes behind enemy lines to join with a local French resistance cell in a mission to destroy the cannon. The mission is a success, but John is the sole survivor of his unit, while Zimmer narrowly escapes with his life.

Months later, John, Zimmer and Roland are all separately reassigned to Tunisia on their respective sides. John befriends British commando Captain Martin Scott, who is forced to leave his family during Christmastime to return to duty. Roland narrowly survives an Allied air attack and meets Zimmer, who reads him a letter sent by Annelise. Unbeknownst to them both, Annelise is arrested by the Gestapo at the whims of Jurgens. Her interrogators offer her reprieve from the concentration camps if she exposes the locations of her colleagues, forced underground by the Nazi regime. Without any means of escape, Annelise manages to break from captivity long enough to commit suicide.

The Allies prepare for an offensive against the Mareth Line, with Scott assigned to clear a pathway of mines for a tank detachment. The night before the attack, John is contacted by Foster, who tells him that Ted has been killed in action. O'Hara tries to comfort John by quoting him John Donne's "For Whom the Bell Tolls", while Scott sets out to clear the mines. Things go wrong when they're caught by German sentries led by Zimmer and pinned down in a foxhole until daybreak. With only minutes left until the tanks arrive, Scott and his remaining men make a break for the tanks, Scott managing to climb atop and warn the crew before they reach the mines. Thanks to his efforts, the Allied tanks manage to break through the German defenses; Roland is killed as his position is overrun, and Scott loots the "In God We Trust" medallion off of his body. O'Hara is killed by stray artillery fire, and in Paris, Danielle is killed by partisans who mistake her for a collaborator.

With the Battle of the Mareth Line ending in an Allied victory, Scott gifts John the medallion, and he notes its similarities to his father's own without realizing the significance. John is promoted and reassigned as an aide to General George Patton, and Scott tells John that there are more battles and more wars to come. In America, General Foster visits his Ted's grave as he's informed of John's promotion.

== Cast ==
- Helmut Berger as Lt. Kurt Zimmer
- Samantha Eggar as Annelise Ackermann
- Giuliano Gemma as Capt. Martin Scott
- John Huston as Sean O'Hara
- Stacy Keach as Lt. Manfred Roland
- Ray Lovelock as John Foster
- Henry Fonda as Brig. Gen. Harold Foster
- Edwige Fenech as Danielle
- Venantino Venantini as Michael
- Ida Galli as Miss Scott
- Rik Battaglia as Yves
- Andrea Bosic as Mimis Parnat
- Guy Doleman as Brig. Gen. Whitmore
- Aldo Massasso as Lt. William McShane
- Attilio Dottesio as Pierre
- Geoffrey Copleston as Waffen-SS Col. Jurgens
- Mirko Ellis as Hans Becker
- Giacomo Rossi Stuart as Batelli
- Robert Spafford as Gen. George Patton
- Tom Felleghy as Col. Thompson
- Marco Guglielmi as Capt. Fitzpatrick
- Bill Vanders as Gen. Hans-Jürgen von Arnim
- Helga Liné as Irene
- Flaminia Jandolo as Sgt. Anna Moffitt
- Patrick Reynolds as O'Hara's Aide
- Michele Soavi as Ted Foster

== Release ==
The Greatest Battle passed Italian censors on January 19, 1978. The film was released under several titles, including La Battaglia di Mareth, The Biggest Battle and The Great Battle. The original American release was cut by several minutes, and added a voiceover narration by Orson Welles.

== Reception ==
Mick Martin and Marsha Porter wrote that the film has "lots of phony battle scenes, bad acting, and a poor script". Leonard Maltin writes: "Amateurish muddle about WW2 combines tired vignettes with well-known stars, dubbed sequences with others, and newsreel footage narrated by Orson Welles. A waste of everybody's time."

In his memoir All in All, Stacy Keach described the film as "flat-out awful," and stated he only appeared in the film in order to work with Henry Fonda and John Huston.
