= Franco Micalizzi =

Italian composer and conductor

Franco Micalizzi (born 21 December 1939 in Rome) is an Italian composer and conductor, best known for his scores in Poliziotteschi films.

His first success was for the musical score of the Spaghetti Western They Call Me Trinity, in 1970. He had previously collaborated on composing with Roberto Pregadio the famous whistled western score for the 1969 film The Forgotten Pistolero (original: Il Pistolero dell'Ave Maria). His main theme for the 1976 poliziottesco film A Special Cop in Action was used in the soundtrack of Quentin Tarantino's Death Proof.

His other scores include The Last Snows of Spring, Beyond the Door and The Last Hunter. He often worked with Umberto Lenzi, scoring his movies Syndicate Sadists, Rome Armed to the Teeth, Violent Naples, The Cynic, the Rat and the Fist, Brothers Till We Die, The Greatest Battle, From Corleone to Brooklyn, Black Demons and Mean Tricks.

In 1984 he founded the group "The Micalizzi Family" with his sons Cristiano and Alessandro.

His piece "The Puzzle" appears in the soundtrack of Curb Your Enthusiasm and a slow tempo excerpt of it, rearranged for clarinet and bassoon, is often used in the series as the "stare" theme.

== Selected filmography ==
Year	Film	Directed by	Notes	Latest CD / Digital Release
1968	The Sun Belongs To Everyone	Domenico Paolella		GDM / Digital / 2020
1969	Macabre	Javier Setó		
1970	Il Pistolero Dell'Ave Maria	Ferdinando Baldi	With Roberto Pregadio	GDM / GDM 4175 / 2014
1970	They Call Me Trinity	Gianfranco Plenizio		Digitmovies / DPDM009 / 2013
1972	Panhandle 38	Antonio Secchi		Digitmovies / CDDM229 / 2012
1972	The Two Faces of Fear	Tulio Demicheli		Digitmovies / CDDM088 / 2007
1972	You're Jinxed, Friend You've Met Sacramento	Giorgio Cristallini		Digitmovies / CDDM088 / 2007
1973	Storia de fratelli e de cortelli	Mario Amendola		
1973	The Last Snows of Spring	Raimondo Del Balzo		Digitmovies / CDDM327 / 2024
1973	Karate Amazones	Alfonso Brescia	as Al Bradley	Digitmovies / CDDM163 / 2010
1974	Perverse Adolescence	José Bénazéraf		Fin De Siècle Media / FDS 20 / 2006
1974	The tree with pink leaves	Armando Nannuzzi		Digitmovies / CDDM327 / 2024
1974	Il figlio della sepolta viva	Luciano Ercoli	as André Colbert	Kronos Records / KRONCD013 /2013
1974	Alla mia cara mamma nel giorno del suo compleanno	Luciano Salce		GDM / Digital / 2023
1974	Ante Up	Germán Lorente		Fin De Siècle Media / FDS21 / 2007
1974	Young Lucrezia	Luciano Ercoli		Beat Records Company / CDCR 16 / 1994
1974	Beyond the Door	Ovidio Assonitis and Roberto D'Ettore Piazzolli	as Oliver Hellman and Robert Barrett	Digitmovies / CDDM202 / 2011
1974	Hold-Up	Germán Lorente		Fin De Siècle Media – FDS21
1974	Super Stooges vs. the Wonder Women	Alfonso Brescia	as Al Bradley	Fin De Siècle Media / FDS19 / 2006
1975	White Horses of Summer	Raimondo Del Balzo		Digitmovies / CDDM327 / 2024
1975	Syndicate Sadists	Umberto Lenzi		Digitmovies / CDDM176 / 2010
1975	Private Lessons	Vittorio De Sisti		GDM Music / Digital Only / 2020
1976	Albert And The Black Man	Dino B. Partesano		Digitmovies / SPDM005 / 2010
1976	Laure	Emmanuelle Arsan		Digitmovies / CDDM133 / 2009
1976	The Tough Ones	Umberto Lenzi		Beat Records Company / BCM 9502 / 2011
1976	Violent Naples	Umberto Lenzi		Beat Records Company / CDCR 79 / 2007
1976	A Special Cop in Action	Marino Girolami	as Franco Martinelli	Beat Records Company / CDCR 144 / 2020
1976	Giovannino	Paolo Nuzzi		
1976	Merciless Man	Mario Lanfranchi		Digitmovies / CDDM308 / 2020
1977	The Cynic, the Rat and the Fist	Umberto Lenzi		Beat Records Company / BCM 9503 / 2011
1978	The Greatest Battle	Umberto Lenzi	as Humphrey Longan	Digitmovies / CDDM181 / 2011
1978	Brothers Till We Die	Umberto Lenzi		Digitmovies / CDDM303 / 2020
1979	Scusi lei è normale?	Umberto Lenzi		GDM / Digital /2020
1979	The Visitor	Giulio Paradisi		Quartet Records / QR516 / 2023
1979	From Corleone to Brooklyn	Umberto Lenzi		Digitmovies / CDDM307 / 2020
1980	The Last Hunter	Antonio Margheriti		Chris' Soundtrack Corner / CSC 015 / 2013
1980	Crime At Porta Romana	Bruno Corbucci		Digitmovies / CDDM248 / 2013
1981	Il ficcanaso	Bruno Corbucci		
1982	Crime on the Highway	Bruno Corbucci		GDM / GDM 2084 / 2007
1982	Odd Squad	Enzo Barboni	as E.B. Clucher	CAM / Digital / 2025
1983	Go for It	Enzo Barboni	as E.B. Clucher	Beat Records Company / CDCR 77 / 2007
1984	Double Trouble	Enzo Barboni	as E.B. Clucher	Beat Records Company / CDCR 81 / 2008
1987	The Curse	David Keith		GDM / GDM 4205 / 2011
1988	Rimini Rimini - A Year Later	Bruno Corbucci		Beat Records Company / BCM 9518 / 2011
1991	Black Demons	Umberto Lenzi		GDM / GDM 4205 / 2011
1992	Mean Tricks	Umberto Lenzi		
