= The Cynic, the Rat and the Fist =

- Directed by: Umberto Lenzi
- Screenplay by: Ernesto Gastaldi; Dardano Sacchetti; Umberto Lenzi
- Story by: Sauro Scavolini
- Produced by: Luciano Martino
- Starring: Maurizio Merli; John Saxon; Renzo Palmer; Gabriella Lepori; Robert Hundar; Bruno Corazzari; Marco Guglielmi; Gabriella Giorgelli; Gianni Musy; Gianfilippo Carcano; Tomas Milian
- Cinematography: Federico Zani
- Edited by: Eugenio Alabiso
- Music by: Franco Micalizzi
- Production companies: Dania Film; Medusa Distribuzione
- Distributed by: Medusa
- Release date: 3 February 1977 (Italy)
- Running time: 100 minutes
- Country: Italy
- Box office: ₤1.818 billion

The Cynic, the Rat and the Fist (Italian: Il cinico, l'infame, il violento, lit. 'The Cynic, the Infamous, the Violent') is an Italian poliziotteschi film directed in 1977 by Umberto Lenzi and third entry into the Tanzi/Moretto/Monnezza shared universe as well as serving as a direct sequel to The Tough Ones. The film was described by Italian film critic and historian Roberto Curti as "a sequel of sorts" to Lenzi's 1976 The Tough Ones, with Maurizio Merli reprising the role of Inspector Leonardo Tanzi.

The title of the movie inspired the book Cinici infami e violenti (2005), written by Daniele Magni and Silvio Giobbio, a book guide about "Poliziotteschi".

== Plot ==
Luigi "The Chinaman" Maietto escapes from prison. As soon as he is free, he assigns immediately two henchman to murder the inspector whose testimonial once led to his prison sentence. Inspector Tanzi is left for dead but survives. The local newspapers cover up for him and pretend the assassination had succeeded. When Tanzi gets better, his superior wants him to hide in Switzerland. But Tanzi defies him because he intends to make sure himself that Maietto is put back in prison. He goes for it.

== Cast ==
- Maurizio Merli as Leonardo Tanzi
- Tomas Milian as Luigi "The Chinaman" Maietto
- John Saxon as Frank Di Maggio
- Renzo Palmer as Commissioner Astalli
- Gabriella Lepori as Nadia
- Robert Hundar as Dario
- Bruno Corazzari as Cesare Ettore
- Marco Guglielmi as Marchetti, Di Maggio's lawyer
- Gabriella Giorgelli as Maria Balzano
- Guido Alberti as Tanzi's Uncle
- Gianni Musy as Nicola Proietti
- Gianfilippo Carcano as The Professor
- Massimo Bonetti as "Cappuccino"
- Riccardo Garrone as Natali
- Ennio Antonelli as barber in jail

== Production ==
Screenwriter Ernesto Gastaldi later spoke negatively on his work on the film "the story wasn't mine, and I just did supervising work on the finished script. Actually, I didn't even like the movie." The film was shot at Elios film and on location in Rome.

== Release ==
The Cynic, the Rat, and the Fist was distributed theatrically in Italy by Medusa on February 3, 1977. It grossed a total of 1,818,523,920 Italian lira on its domestic release in Italy, an amount Curti described as "very successful at the box office."

== Notes ==
=== References ===
- Curti, Roberto (2013). Italian Crime Filmography, 1968-1980. McFarland. ISBN 978-0786469765.
- Bondanella, Peter E. (2009). A History of Italian Cinema. Continuum International Publishing Group. ISBN 978-1-4411-6069-0.
