= Il lupo e l'agnello =

The Wolf and the Lamb
- Directed by: Francesco Massaro
- Written by: Francesco Massaro; Enrico Vanzina; Michel Audiard; Mario Amendola; Bruno Corbucci
- Cinematography: Armando Nannuzzi
- Music by: Giancarlo Chiaramello
- Release date: 8 March 1980
- Language: Italian

Il lupo e l'agnello (The Wolf and the Lamb), also known as Le Coucou, is a 1980 Italian-French comedy film directed by Francesco Massaro.

== Plot ==
Leo is a victim of constant complaints by his family, with his wife, Ivana, his two daughters, Ursula and Suni and her stepmother, Fanny, treating him like the dog house. A criminal nicknamed "Cuckoo", following a bloody robbery, finds refuge in Leon's house, and under the threat of a gun he will be able to cease reprimands and vexations against Leon.

== Cast ==
- Tomas Milian: "Cuckoo"
- Michel Serrault: Leon De Paris
- Ombretta Colli: Ivana
- Laura Adani: Fanny
- Giacomo Furia: Inspector
- Giuliana Calandra: Miss De Luca
- Daniele Vargas: Colonel De Luca
- Patrizia Webley: Sonia
