= Brothers Till We Die =

1977 film by Umberto Lenzi

- Directed by: Umberto Lenzi
- Written by: Umberto Lenzi
- Screenplay by: Umberto Lenzi
- Produced by: Luciano Martino
- Starring: Tomas Milian
- Cinematography: Federico Zanni
- Edited by: Eugenio Alabiso
- Music by: Franco Micalizzi
- Production companies: Dania Film; Medusa
- Distributed by: Medusa
- Release date: 18 August 1977 (Italy)
- Running time: 98 minutes
- Country: Italy
- Box office: ₤1.523 billion

Brothers Till We Die (Italian: La banda del gobbo) is a 1977 Italian poliziottesco-action film by Umberto Lenzi and fifth and final entry into the Tanzi/Moretto/Monnezza shared universe. This film is the last collaboration among Lenzi and Tomas Milian. In this movie Milian plays two characters, Vincenzo Marazzi a.k.a. "The Hunchback" that he already played for Lenzi in The Tough Ones, and his twin brother Sergio Marazzi a.k.a. "Er Monnezza", a role that he played for the first time in Lenzi's Free Hand for a Tough Cop and later resumed in Destruction Force by Stelvio Massi.

== Plot ==
The notorious Italian criminal known as "Hunchback" (Italian: il gobbo) returns in Rome from Corsica after his imprisonment. Together with his younger brother and other accomplices, he plans to raid an armoured truck. But things go awry.

== Cast ==
- Tomas Milian: Vincenzo Marazzi, a.k.a. "Il Gobbo" (The Hunchback); Sergio Marazzi, a.k.a. "Er Monnezza" (a double role)
- Pino Colizzi: Commissioner Sarti
- Mario Piave: Commissioner Valenzi
- Isa Danieli: Maria
- Sal Borgese: Milo Dragovic, a.k.a. "Albanese"
- Luciano Catenacci: Perrone
- Guido Leontini: Mario Di Gennaro, a.k.a. "Er Sogliola"
- Nello Pazzafini: Carmine Ciacci
- Solvi Stubing: Marika Engver

== Release ==
Brothers Til We Die was released in Italy on 18 August 1977 where it was distributed by Medusa. It grossed 1,523,844,720 Italian lire domestically.

== Footnotes ==
=== References ===
- Curti, Roberto (2013). Italian Crime Filmography, 1968–1980. McFarland. ISBN 978-0786469765.
