= Destruction Force =

- Italian theatrical release poster by Renato Casaro
- Directed by: Stelvio Massi
- Cinematography: Franco Delli Colli
- Music by: Bruno Canfora
- Release date: 18 March 1977
- Country: Italy
- Language: Italian

Destruction Force (originally titled La banda del trucido (The Numbskull's Gang), also known as Dirty Gang) is a 1977 Italian poliziottesco directed by Stelvio Massi. It is the fourth entry into the Tanzi/Moretto/Monnezza shared universe and second film in which Tomas Milian plays the character of Monnezza serving as a direct sequel to Free Hand for a Tough Cop (Il trucido e lo sbirro).

The participation of Milian was due to an old contract he was forced to fulfill; originally intended as a special appearance, the role of Milian was expanded to make it appear as the star of the film, and Milian obtained in exchange to construct his character as he wanted and to write (uncredited) his dialogue lines. The film was shot in three weeks, but Milian filmed his part in just five days.

== Cast ==
- Luc Merenda: Commissioner Ghini
- Tomas Milian: Sergio Marazzi, aka "Er Monnezza"
- Massimo Vanni: Marchetti
- Elio Zamuto: Belli
- Franco Citti: Antonio Lanza
- Mario Brega: Quaestor Alberti
- Imma Piro: Agnese Rinaldi
- Katia Christine: Carla
- Corrado Solari: Chica
