= Dèmoni 3 =

Noite Maldita - Demoni 3
- DVD cover with the alternate title of Black Demons.
- Directed by: Umberto Lenzi
- Written by: Olga Pehar
- Story by: Umberto Lenzi
- Produced by: Giuseppe Gargiulo
- Starring: Keith Van Hoven; Joe Balogh; Maria Alves
- Cinematography: Maurizio Dell'Orco
- Edited by: Vanio Amici
- Music by: Franco Micalizzi
- Distributed by: Shriek Show
- Release date: 25 March 1991
- Running time: 88 minutes
- Country: Italy
- Language: Italian

Noite Maldita - Demoni 3 (originally known as Black Demons) is a 1991 Italian horror film directed by Umberto Lenzi (his last horror film). It was written by Lenzi and his wife Olga Pehar, and the zombie makeup fx were handled by Franco Casagni. Lenzi said in later interviews that this was one of his favorite films, but he felt it was ruined by the low budget.

== Synopsis ==
Two American college students, Dick, his sister Jessica, and her English boyfriend Kevin, are traveling through Brazil on vacation when Dick, after attending a bizarre voodoo ceremony, develops strange powers.

When their jeep breaks down near a small plantation in the jungle outside Rio, the site of a former slave rebellion one hundred years ago, Dick uses his powers to raise from the dead six executed slaves, who target the college kids and the residents of the plantation to seek revenge for their deaths.

== Film title ==
Lenzi intended Demoni 3 to be called Black Demons, and he did not like it when the film was later retitled Demoni 3 on video, because some people thought it was part of Lamberto Bava's Demons series, which it had absolutely nothing to do with.

Lamberto Bava also directed a film in 1988 for Italian TV entitled The Ogre (aka House of the Ogre), which was released on video in the US as Demons III: The Ogre. Despite the American title, it is also not related in any way to Bava's Demons series. The film that was actually intended to be Demoni 3 was instead released as The Church (La Chiesa), produced by Dario Argento, directed by Michele Soavi and written by Argento, Soavi and Franco Ferrini.
