= The Bloody Hands of the Law =

1973 film

- Film poster
- Directed by: Mario Gariazzo
- Written by: Mario Gariazzo
- Produced by: Giuseppe Rispoli
- Starring: Klaus Kinski
- Cinematography: Enrico Cortese
- Edited by: Alberto Gallitti
- Music by: Stelvio Cipriani
- Release date: 3 November 1973
- Running time: 80 minutes
- Country: Italy
- Language: Italian

The Bloody Hands of the Law (Italian: La mano spietata della legge) is a 1973 Italian crime film directed by Mario Gariazzo and starring Klaus Kinski.

== Cast ==
- Philippe Leroy – Commissario Gianni De Carmine
- Tony Norton – D'Amico
- Silvia Monti – Linda De Carmine
- Klaus Kinski – Vito Quattroni
- Fausto Tozzi – Nicolò Patrovita
- Pia Giancaro – Lilly Antonelli
- Cyril Cusack – Giudice
- Guido Alberti – Prof. Palmieri
- Lincoln Tate – Joe Gambino
- Marino Masé – Giuseppe di Leo
- Luciano Rossi
- Sergio Fantoni – Musante
- Rosario Borelli – Salvatore Perrone
- Tom Felleghy
- Valentino Macchi
- Lorenzo Fineschi
- Denise O'Hara – Elsa Lutzer
- Lorenzo Magnolia
- Stelio Candelli
