= Uno contro l'altro, praticamente amici =

1981 Italian crime comedy film

- Directed by: Bruno Corbucci
- Written by: Bruno Corbucci; Mario Amendola
- Starring: Renato Pozzetto; Tomas Milian
- Cinematography: Giovanni Ciarlo
- Music by: Guido & Maurizio De Angelis
- Release date: 11 April 1981
- Running time: 90 minutes
- Country: Italy
- Language: Italian

Uno contro l'altro, praticamente amici (Against Each Other, Practically Friends) is a 1981 Italian comedy film directed by Bruno Corbucci.

== Cast ==
- Renato Pozzetto as Franco Colombo
- Tomas Milian as Quinto Cecioni aka "Er Monnezza"
- Anna Maria Rizzoli as Silvana Cecioni
- Bombolo as Capoccione
- Caterina Boratto as Miss Colombo, mother of Franco
- Riccardo Billi as Grandpa Domenico
- Alfredo Rizzo as Lawyer Randolfi
- Alessandra Cardini as Miss Cecioni
- Leo Gavero as Minister
- Elisa Mainardi as Madama di Tebe
- Sergio Di Pinto as Paccotto
- Andrea Aureli as Giacinto
- Francesco Anniballi as Sor Gigi
- Tony Scarf as Charly Broonson
- Ennio Antonelli as Cicerchia

== See also ==
- List of Italian films of 1981
