= A Fine Pair =

- Original movie poster
- Directed by: Francesco Maselli
- Written by: Francesco Maselli; Luisa Montagnana; Virgil C. Leone
- Produced by: Léo L. Fuchs
- Starring: Rock Hudson; Claudia Cardinale
- Cinematography: Alfio Contini
- Edited by: Nicoletta Nardi
- Music by: Ennio Morricone
- Production companies: Cinema Center Films, Vides Cinematografica
- Distributed by: National General Pictures
- Release dates: 27 September 1968 (Italy); 10 May 1969 (USA)
- Running time: 89 minutes
- Country: Italy
- Language: Italian

A Fine Pair (Italian: Ruba al prossimo tuo) is a 1968 Italian crime-comedy film directed by Francesco Maselli. It stars Rock Hudson and Claudia Cardinale, who had co-starred together two years earlier in the romantic drama, Blindfold.

== Plot ==
Married New York City Police Department Captain Mike Harmon (Hudson) receives a visit from Esmeralda Marini (Cardinale), who he has not seen in 12 years, since she was a child. She is the daughter of an old police colleague from Italy, Inspector Marini who is now deceased. Mike recalls those six months in Italy as the happiest in his life. She has come to New York to ask specifically for Mike's help, her father telling her always to trust Mike if she's in trouble. She finally admits to him that she is a jewel thief, but that she wants to turn over a new leaf by returning the jewels she and a well-known criminal named Jackie Mitchell stole from the safe of the villa of wealthy and famous Ogden Fairchild in Kitzbühel, Austria. Since the Fairchilds are not in Kitzbühel at the moment, they do not even know that the jewels are yet missing. So, Mike figures if they can break into the villa and replace the jewels into the safe before the Fairchilds return to Kitzbühel, Esmeralda will not have to face prosecution. But breaking in the second time around may be more difficult than the first. As Mike helps Esmeralda with this problem, the two start to fall for each other. But each has secrets in doing what they are doing together, the motives behind those secrets which may be incompatible.

== Cast ==
- Rock Hudson as Captain Mike Harmon
- Claudia Cardinale as Esmeralda Marini
- Tomas Milian as Roger
- Leon Askin as Chief Wellman
- Ellen Corby as Maddy Walker
- Walter Giller as Franz
- Guido Alberti as Uncle Camillo Marini
- Peter Dane as Albert Kinsky
- Tony Lo Bianco as Officer McClusky
