= Spasmo =

- Directed by: Umberto Lenzi
- Written by: Félix Tusell; Pino Boller; Massimo Franciosa; Luisa Montagnana; Umberto Lenzi
- Produced by: Ugo Tucci
- Starring: Robert Hoffman; Suzy Kendall; Ivan Rassimov
- Cinematography: Antonio Millán
- Edited by: Eugenio Alabiso
- Music by: Ennio Morricone
- Release date: February 16, 1974 (Italy)
- Running time: 94 minutes
- Country: Italy

Spasmo is a 1974 Italian giallo film directed by Umberto Lenzi and starring Robert Hoffmann and Suzy Kendall.

== Plot ==
A young couple visit the beach at night and discover the brutalized remains of a mannequin. A man loitering nearby flees in his car.

Christian and his girlfriend Xenia visit the same beach and pause to check on a woman, Barbara, lying face-down in the sand. She leaves hastily, leaving her flask. Christian uses the inscription on the flask to track her down. They both attend a boat party at the local marina and she invites him back to her motel, to the annoyance of her current lover, Alex. The drive to the motel takes them through a wooded area full of hanging, beaten, lingerie-clad mannequins.

Christian tells Barbara about a terrible childhood incident with his father, and Barbara explains that Alex is not her boyfriend but more of a provider. They are interrupted by a thug, Tatum, who enters through an open window and threatens Christian with a gun. A brief struggle ensues and Tatum is shot. Barbara, strangely calm about the death, convinces Christian to flee the motel with her. That night, Tatum's body has vanished. They go to her friend's place, a seaside castle and lighthouse. A strange man clad in red watches them from the sea.

Christian insists that his brother Fritz can help, but Barbara refutes him. The arguing pair are interrupted by renters Malcolm and Clorinda; the former speaks about a local murder. Christian, wary of being discovered, admits that he is the killer, but Malcolm explains that he was just joking. Confused, Christian rushes off to the marina, where he's followed once more. He returns to the castle as Tatum severs the power.

Taking refuge in the lighthouse, Barbara and Christian see Malcolm and Luca, the stalker, talking about a suspicious plan. Barbara, alone, is confronted by Tatum right after. Christian tells Clorinda that he knows her, and in a sudden rage, he rapes her. The next day, Barbara is gone. Christian desperately searches for her yet finds nothing. Increasingly going out of his mind, Christian returns to the property, and discovers a murdered Malcolm. He leaves in a panic, not noticing an arm at the bottom of the well.

On the road, Christian is accosted by Tatum. He forces him to drive to a quarry, revealing his plan to merely drive him insane. Tatum has him drive to the edge of the cliff to frame his death as an accident and exits the car. Christian turns the table on him, reverses the car, and runs him over. Christian swaps belongings with him, shoves the dead body in the car, and pushes it off the cliff, where it explodes.

Barbara and Luca arrive to make sure that 'Christian' is dead. As they leave, Christian follows them back to his family's factory run by his brother Fritz. He listens in on their conversation, confirming Tatum's statements. Barbara, in love with Christian, admonishes them for murdering 'Christian' and for lying about wanting to "cure" Christian. Christian returns to Xenia's place to explain everything and calls his brother.

Meanwhile, Fritz has investigated the car crash and figures out that it is not Christian's body in the wreckage. He indulges in a series of old family movies at his factory, revealing that Christian had schizophrenia due to his father's hereditary lunacy. Christian remembers that Clorinda was his nurse at the psychiatric hospital and that Malcolm was the doctor.

At the motel, Christian interrupts Barbara, who is planning a getaway with Luca. While the pair lovingly make up, Christian sees Clorinda's face, his ex-girlfriend and the random woman who picked him up for prostitution earlier as he strangles Barbara. He runs off, and Alex discovers her corpse. In the woods, Christian tearfully begs Alex to shoot him, to which he does. As he bleeds out, he makes his way back to the beach where he originally found Barbara, and dies.

Fritz wanders home, and makes his way to a closet full of lingerie-clad mannequins, all with puncture marks and other disfigurements. As he slowly makes his way to a particular mannequin, he repeatedly stabs it, releasing his pent-up rage and insanity.

== Cast ==
- Robert Hoffmann as Christian
- Suzy Kendall as Barbara
- Ivan Rassimov as Fritz
- Adolfo Lastretti as Tatum (Italian version: Torres)
- Monica Monet as Clorinda
- Guido Alberti as Malcolm
- Franco Silva as Luca

== Production ==
Director Umberto Lenzi declared that he had taken the project from Lucio Fulci and had to re-work it drastically. Lenzi stated he received the script from the producer written by Pino Boller, who Lenzi described as "a friend of the producer who just couldn't write. When they gave me the script, I had to re-write almost everything." Lenzi said he had to implement things that would interest an audience, such as the life sized dolls in the film. Lenzi later claimed that the film "was only saved thanks to my direction [...] without me it would have been worthless."

The film was shot near Orbetello, Tuscany.

== Release ==
Spasmo was released in Italy on February 16, 1974. Italian critic and film historian Roberto Curti stated the film "did not do wonders in the box office..." Reportedly, George A. Romero was hired to shoot the additional footage for the American release.
