= Syndicate Sadists =

- Directed by: Umberto Lenzi
- Screenplay by: Vincenzo Mannino
- Story by: Vincenzo Mannino
- Produced by: Luciano Martino
- Starring: Tomas Milian; Joseph Cotten; Maria Fiore
- Cinematography: Federico Zanni
- Edited by: Daniele Alabiso
- Music by: Franco Micalizzi
- Production company: Dania Films
- Distributed by: Medusa
- Release date: 16 August 1975 (Italy)
- Running time: 95 minutes
- Country: Italy
- Box office: ₤1.451 billion

Syndicate Sadists (Italian: Il giustiziere sfida la città, or "The Executioner Challenges the City"), also released under the titles Rambo's Revenge and Final Payment, is a 1975 poliziotteschi film directed by Umberto Lenzi. It stars Joseph Cotten and Tomas Milian.

== Plot ==
Milián plays Rambo, an ex-cop who seeks revenge against two powerful crime families who were responsible for the murder of his friend.

== Cast ==
- Tomas Milian as Rambo
- Joseph Cotten as Paternò
- Adolfo Lastretti as Ciccio Paternò
- Mario Piave as Pino Scalia
- Maria Fiore as Maria Scalia
- Duilio Cruciani as Luigino Scalia
- Silvano Tranquilli as Eng. Marco Marsili
- Evelyn Stewart as wife of Eng. Marsili
- Alessandro Cocco as Giampiero Marsili

== Production ==
The film predates Ted Kotcheff's First Blood, the film which introduced audiences to the John Rambo of David Morrell by seven years. Tomas Milian happened to read David Morrell's novel while flying from the U.S. to Rome. Loving the story he tried to talk some Italian producers into making a film out of it, with him starring as John Rambo. Nothing came of this, but he was allowed to use the Rambo moniker in the next poliziottesco he starred in. The film does not borrow elements from the novel, with Lenzi stating he was more influenced by Don Siegel's crime films.

Ida Galli took a role in the film when her real-life son Alessandro Cocco was cast as a kidnap victim.

== Release ==
Syndicate Sadists was released in Italy on August 16, 1975 where it was distributed by Medusa. It grossed 1,451,703,190 Italian lire. Film historian Roberto Curti described it as a "huge hit in Italy".

Syndicate Sadists was released in the United States by Sam Sherman's Independent International. It was released in the United States titles Rambo's Revenge and on home video as Final Payment. It has been released as One Just Man in the United Kingdom. The unrated American DVD of the film is missing two minutes of footage: a scene where the mother of the kidnapped boy comes home and Paterno's henchmen searching for Rambo in a pub, and two reaction shots.
