= Umberto Lenzi =

Italian director and writer (1931–2017)

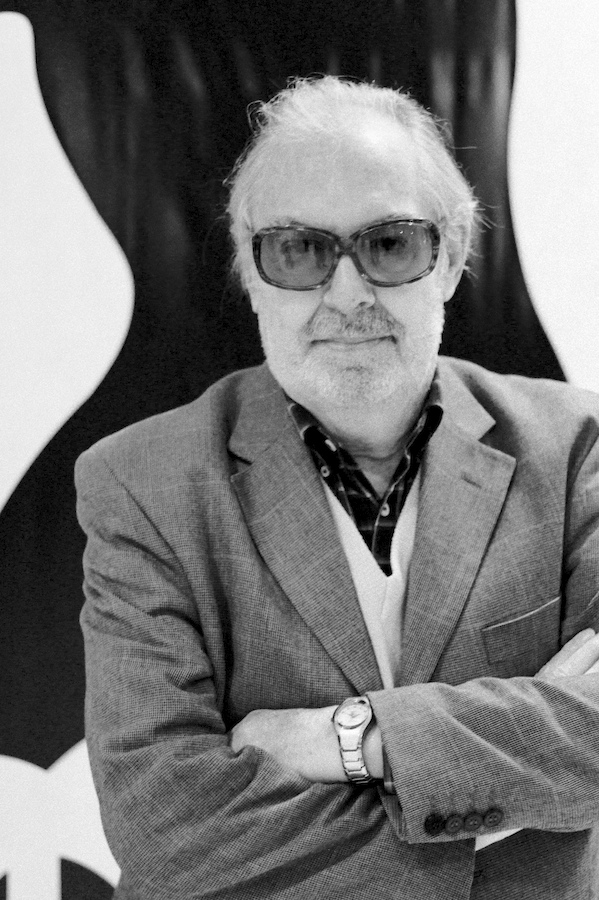
- Umberto Lenzi at the Festival de Cine de Sitges in October 2008.
- Born: 6 August 1931; Massa Marittima, Italy
- Died: 19 October 2017 (aged 86); Rome, Italy
- Occupations: Film director and screenwriter
- Years active: 1956-1993
- Spouse: Olga Pehar

Signature
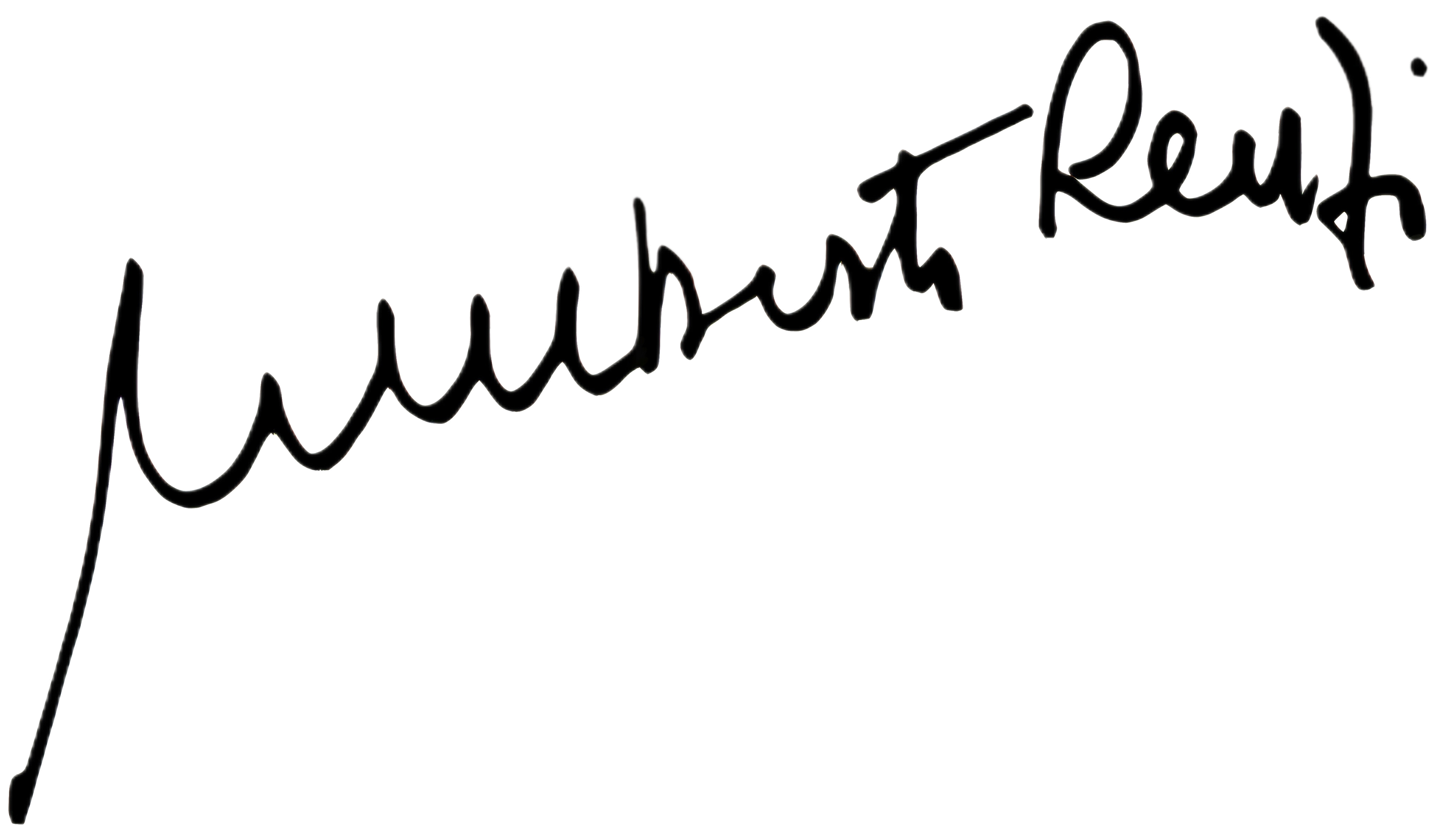

Umberto Lenzi (6 August 1931 – 19 October 2017) was an Italian film director, screenwriter, and novelist.

A fan of film since young age, Lenzi studied at the Centro Sperimentale di Cinematografia and made his first film in 1958 which went unreleased, while his official debut happened in 1961 with Queen of the Seas. Lenzi's films of the 1960s followed popular trends of the era, which led to him directing several spy and erotic thriller films. He followed in suit in the 1970s making giallo films, crime films and making the first Italian cannibal film with Man from the Deep River. He continued making films up until the 1990s and later worked as a novelist writing a series of murder mysteries.

== Biography ==
=== Early life ===
Umberto Lenzi was born on 6 August 1931 in Massa Marittima, a town of the province of Grosseto, Italy. Lenzi was a film enthusiast as early as grade school. While studying law, Lenzi also created film fan clubs. Lenzi eventually put off studying law and began pursuing the technical arts of filmmaking.

He graduated from Rome's Centro Sperimentale di Cinematografia in 1956 and made I ragazzi di Trastevere as his final exam, a short film influenced by the writings of Pier Paolo Pasolini. Lenzi also worked as a journalist for various newspapers and magazines, including Bianco e Nero and, between 1957 and 1960, penned a number of detective novels and adventure stories using a pseudonym.

=== 1960s ===
Prior to his officially first credited film as a director, Queen of the Seas, Lenzi directed a film in Greece in 1958 titled Mia Italida stin Ellada, or Vacanze ad Atene, which was never released.

Lenzi's films of the 1960s revolved around popular genres of their respective time periods. In the early 1960s, Lenzi directed many adventure films including two features about Robin Hood (The Triumph of Robin Hood and The Invincible Masked Rider) and two films about Sandokan (Sandokan the Great (1963) and Pirates of Malaysia (1964)).

By 1965, Lenzi began directing European spy films, such as 008: Operation Exterminate, followed by Super Seven Calling Cairo and The Spy Who Loved Flowers, and even adapted the fumetti neri comic character Kriminal to the screen. Lenzi then turned to making war films such as Desert Commandos and Legion of the Damned and westerns such as Pistol for a Hundred Coffins and All Out (1968).

Lenzi had box office success in Italy with his erotic thrillers starring Carroll Baker such as Orgasmo, So Sweet... So Perverse and A Quiet Place to Kill which were influenced by French "film noir" movies drawing from the works of Jacques Deray and René Clément.

=== 1970s ===
After the commercial success of giallo films by Dario Argento, Lenzi followed the new trend with Seven Bloodstained Orchids, which referenced both Cornell Woolrich and Edgar Wallace novels, while another giallo Knife of Ice was a variation of Robert Siodmak's The Spiral Staircase. Other gialli created by Lenzi in the early 1970s included Spasmo and Eyeball.

During the early 1970s, Lenzi also directed the first of the Italian cannibal films, with Man from the Deep River, a genre that he would explore again in the 1980s with Eaten Alive! and Cannibal Ferox. During the late 1970s, Lenzi devoted himself almost exclusively to crime dramas, with the exception of two war films: The Greatest Battle and From Hell to Victory (1979).

=== 1980s ===
The 1980s marked the release of films that Roberto Curti described as some of Lenzi's "most notorious". These included Nightmare City and the previously mentioned Cannibal Ferox.

Lenzi also worked on horror films towards the late 1980s, such as Ghosthouse (1988) under the name Humphrey Humbert and the slasher film Nightmare Beach which was credited to Harry Kirkpatrick as Lenzi refused to sign his name to the film. Other later 1980s work included horror films made for television, such as The House of Witchraft and The House of Lost Souls. Both films were part of a series titled Le case maldette (transl. Houses of Doom) which were set up by Luciano Martino and were related by the theme of haunted houses. The films were shot but the series was not broadcast immediately. Lenzi reflected on these films saying he made them as if they were designed for theatrical release and that the producers, his colleagues and himself did not consider that television sponsors would not accept horror films. The two television series were eventually released on VHS in 2000 in Italy and later broadcast on Italian satellite TV in 2006. In 1989, Lenzi directed the police action film Cop Target in Miami and Santo Domingo, starring Robert Ginty and Charles Napier.

=== Post-1980s ===
In 1990, using his own company and a low amount of funds, Lenzi also shot two films in Brazil in a period of three months: the horror film Black Demons, which in 1996 he considered to be his masterpiece, and the adventure film Hunt for the Golden Scorpion.

In 1992, he shot the adventure film Mean Tricks (also known as Hornsby and Rodriguez) starring Charles Napier, David Warbeck and David Brandon. Variety reported in 2006 that Lenzi was shooting a slasher film in Italy titled Horror Baby. The film's story was about a 15-year-old paraplegic girl who becomes a serial killer after viewing a neighbor having sex from her window.

Lenzi later embarked on a career as a novelist, writing a series of murder mysteries set in the 1930s and '40s Cinecittà, involving real-life characters of the Italian film industry.

=== Death ===
Lenzi died on 19 October 2017. The director was hospitalized in the Ostia district of Rome. The cause of death is unknown.

== Personal life ==
Umberto Lenzi was married to Olga Pehar, who co-wrote some of his films.

Lenzi was an anarchist.

== Legacy ==
Roberto Curti referred to Lenzi as "one of the undisputed leading figures in Italian genre cinema" and that he was "a sort of institution in Italian genre cinema." Louis Paul suggested that Lenzi released some "quite enjoyable action films in the 1960s and some good thrillers in the '70s, he never consistently excelled at any one genre" and that Lenzi would "probably be remembered most for his cannibal-themed horror films." Kim Newman discussed Lenzi in 2021, stating that the director "has been rated towards the bottom of the ranks of Italian genre craftsmen by many - me included - because of the greater availability of his pulpier, more gruesome 1980s work" noting Cannibal Ferox and Nightmare City and stated that "though a trailblazer for the little-loved jungle cannibal cycle, contributing its earliest and most gruesome entries, in general Lenzi seemed one of the coat-tail riders, turning to whatever subgenre of exploitation was selling that year...and even in that class, he's less consistently interesting and exciting than Sergio Martino." Newman did note the film Lenzi made with Carroll Baker in the late 1960s, which Newman stated "force a reassessment" on Lenzi's work.

== Select filmography ==
Title	Year	Credited as			Notes	Ref(s)
Title	Year	Director	Writer	Other	Notes	Ref(s)
Queen of the Seas	1961	Yes				
The Triumph of Robin Hood	1962	Yes				
Catherine of Russia	1963	Yes	Yes			
The Invincible Masked Rider	1963	Yes	Yes			
Samson and the Slave Queen	1963	Yes	Yes			
Sandokan the Great	1963	Yes	Yes			
Temple of the White Elephant	1964	Yes	Yes			
Messalina vs. the Son of Hercules	1964	Yes				
Pirates of Malaysia	1964	Yes				
Kriminal	1966	Yes	Yes			
The Spy Who Loved Flowers	1966	Yes	Yes			
Desert Commandos	1967	Yes	Yes			
All Out	1968	Yes				
A Pistol for a Hundred Coffins	1968	Yes				
Battle of the Commandos	1969	Yes				
Orgasmo	1969	Yes	Yes			
So Sweet... So Perverse	1969	Yes				
A Quiet Place to Kill	1970	Yes				
Gang War in Milan	1973	Yes	Yes			
Almost Human	1974	Yes				
Spasmo	1974	Yes	Yes			
Manhunt in the City	1975	Yes	Yes			
Syndicate Sadists	1975	Yes				
Rome Armed to the Teeth	1976	Yes	Yes			
Free Hand for a Tough Cop	1976	Yes	Yes			
Violent Naples	1976	Yes				
Brothers Till We Die	1977	Yes	Yes			
The Cynic, the Rat and the Fist	1977	Yes	Yes			
From Corleone to Brooklyn	1979	Yes	Yes			
Eaten Alive!	1980	Yes	Yes			
Cannibal Ferox	1981	Yes	Yes			
Ironmaster	1983	Yes	Yes			
Ghosthouse	1988	Yes		Yes	Story author	
Hitcher in the Dark	1989	Yes		Yes	Story author	
The House of Witchcraft	1989	Yes	Yes		Made-for-TV film.	
The House of Lost Souls	1989	Yes	Yes		Made-for-TV film.	

== See also ==
- Cannibal boom
- Centro Sperimentale di Cinematografia
- Poliziotteschi
- Spaghetti Nightmares
