= The Cop in Blue Jeans =

1976 Italian crime comedy film

- Directed by: Bruno Corbucci
- Screenplay by: Mario Amendola; Bruno Corbucci
- Story by: Mario Amendola; Bruno Corbucci
- Produced by: Galliano Juso
- Starring: Tomas Milian; Jack Palance; Maria Rosaria Omaggio
- Cinematography: Nino Celeste
- Edited by: Daniele Alabiso
- Music by: Guido & Maurizio De Angelis
- Production company: Cinemaster
- Distributed by: Regional
- Release date: 11 March 1976 (Italy)
- Running time: 95 minutes
- Country: Italy

The Cop in Blue Jeans (Italian: Squadra antiscippo, lit. 'Anti-theft squad') is a 1976 Italian crime and comedy film directed by Bruno Corbucci. The film was a major commercial success and generated a film series consisting of eleven entries starring Tomas Milian as Inspector Nico Giraldi.

== Plot ==
An undercover cop named Giraldi is assigned to the anti-mugging squad. He tries to capture one of the main Rome thieves Achille Bertinari called Baron. But when the later robbed the American crime boss, Richard Russo, also known as Shelley, Giraldi understands that it is not an easy task to arrest Russo-Shelley, so he should resort to ruses to bring him down.

== Cast ==
- Tomas Milian as Nico Giraldi
- Jack Palance as Norman Shelley / Richard J. Russo
- Maria Rosaria Omaggio as Mrs. Cattani
- Guido Mannari as Achille Bertinari "Er Baronetto"
- Jack La Cayenne as Colombo
- Raf Luca as Gargiulo
- Toni Ucci as Lando Rossi "Grottaferrata"
- Vincenzo Crocitti as Er Zagaja
- Benito Stefanelli as Shelley's Henchman
- John P. Dulaney as Ballarin

== Production ==
The Cop in Blue Jeans was the first film where Tomas Milian would portray Marshall Nico Giraldi, nicknamed Il Pirata (transl. The Pirate). The character would go on to be portrayed in 11 films between 1976 and 1984. The producer Galliano Juso recalled that the idea for the character came when Bruno Corbucci and he were making a film titled Il trafficone. While filming, Juso had his purse stolen by thieves on Kawasaki motorcycles. This even led to Corbucci and him to develop a film about an "anti-snatch" squad.

The sequels to the film, Assassinio sul Tevere, Delitto a Porta Romana, Crime at the Chinese Restaurant, Delitto sull'autostrada, Crime in Formula One and Cop in Drag grew more comedic with each film.

== Release ==
The Cop in Blue Jeans was distributed theatrically in Italy on 11 March 1976. It grossed a total of 2,013,807,160 Italian lire. Italian film historian and critic Roberto Curti stated that it was among the most profitable domestic productions of the year. The film was released on DVD by Raro Video in Italy.

== Reception ==
From contemporary reviews, Scott Meek of the Monthly Film Bulletin reviewed a 75-minute edition of the film. Meek stated that the film had a fractured plot which "maybe largely due to the twenty minutes missing from this version, but it is doubtful if, even in its complete form the story would have been at all coherent" stating the film "is aimed, to an almost fetishistic degree, at the lowest common denominator of the young, male, Italian audience," and that film was far too full of "sexism, anti-gay jokes and dubbed American dialogue, mostly consisting of unimaginative terms of abuse."

== See also ==
- List of Italian films of 1976
