= Stelvio Cipriani =

Italian composer

Stelvio Cipriani (Viostel)
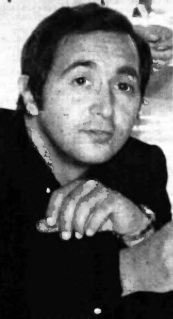

Background information
- Born: 20 August 1937; Rome, Italy
- Died: 1 October 2018 (aged 81) Rome, Italy
- Genres: Film music
- Occupation: Composer

Stelvio Cipriani (20 August 1937 – 1 October 2018), also known as Viostel, was an Italian composer, mostly of motion picture soundtracks, conductor and pianist.

== Biography ==
Though not raised with a strong musical upbringing, as a child Cipriani was fascinated by his church's organ. His priest gave Cipriani his first music lessons and encouraged the boy and his family. Cipriani attended the Santa Cecilia Conservatory starting at the age of 14. Around this time, he played in cruise ship bands, enabling him to meet Dave Brubeck. Upon returning to Italy, he began working as piano accompaniment for Rita Pavone.

Cipriani's first soundtrack was for the Spaghetti Western The Bounty Killer (1966). This was followed by his more widely known score for The Stranger Returns (a 1967 film, also known by the alternate titles A Man, a Horse, a Gun and Shoot First, Laugh Last, starring Tony Anthony). Cipriani would go on to compose other Spaghetti Western scores and also began composing poliziottesco soundtracks.

Cipriani became prolific in the Italian film world, eventually garnering a Nastro d'Argento for Best Score award for The Anonymous Venetian (1970). Furthermore, one of Cipriani's most famous scores would come about in 1973, the soundtrack for La polizia sta a guardare (The Great Kidnapping). The main theme was recycled by Cipriani in 1974 and 1977 for the scores to La polizia chiede aiuto and Tentacoli. This track was brought to the public's attention again in 2007 when it was featured in Quentin Tarantino's Death Proof. Some of the themes from La polizia sta a guardare were also used by Hélène Cattet & Bruno Forzani in the soundtrack for their first feature Amer. Cipriani was also noted for his score of the 1979 film The Concorde Affair.

In a 2007 interview, Cipriani said that he had composed music for Pope John Paul II and was working with Pope Benedict XVI.

On 1 October 2018, he died from complications caused by a stroke he suffered in December the previous year. On 28 October 2018, the Rome Film Festival held a concert event partly to pay tribute to his work by featuring tracks from The Anonymous Venetian.

In October 2023, Cipriani was cited by local news agency it:Italpress as one of the greatest composers in the world, alongside others such as Ennio Morricone, Piero Piccioni, Piero Umiliani, Philippe Sarde and François De Roubaix.

== Selected filmography ==
Year	Film	Directed by	Notes	Latest CD / Digital Release
1966	The Bounty Killer	Eugenio Martín	a.k.a. The Ugly Ones	GDM / GDM 4155 / 2012
1967	The Stranger Returns	Luigi Vanzi	a.k.a. A Man, a Horse, a Gun	GDM / GDM 4154 / 2012
1968	Luana, The Girl Tarzan	Roberto Infascelli	as Bob Raymond	Beat Records Company / BCM9532 / 2015
1968	The Silent Stranger	Luigi Vanzi		
1969	Law of Violence	Gianni Crea		GDM / GDM 4311 / 2013
1969	The Thirteen Chairs	Nicolas Gessner	a.k.a. Twelve Plus One	Digitmovies / CDDM203 / 2012
1969	Agguato Sul Bosforo	Luigi Batzella	as Paull' Hamus	GDM / GDM 4323 / 2014
1969	The Laughing Woman	Piero Schivazappa	also "Femina Ridens"	Digitmovies / CDDM103 / 2008
1969	War Devils	Bitto Albertini	as Bert Albertini	Kronos Records / KRONGOLD017 / 2015
1970	Edipeon	Lorenzo Artale		Digitmovies / CDDM273 / 2015
1970	Overrun!	Mario Siciliano		GDM / GDM 4118 / 2008
1970	Whirlpool	José Ramón Larraz	as J.R. Larrath	Digitmovies / CDDM204 / 2012
1970	Le Mans, Shortcut to Hell	Osvaldo Civirani	as Richard Kean	Digitmovies / CDDM221 / 2012
1970	Rough Justice	Mario Costa	a.k.a. The Beast	GDM / GDM 4122 / 2008
1970	The Loves of Daphne	Oscar Brazzi		CAM / Digital / 2025
1970	The Anonymous Venetian	Enrico Maria Salerno		Digitmovies / DPDM013 / 2013
1970	The Lickerish Quartet	Radley Metzger		
1971	Sex of the Devil	Oscar Brazzi		Quartet Records / QR366 / 2019
1971	Finders Killers	Gianni Crea		GDM / GDM 4122 / 2008
1971	They Call Me Hallelujah	Giuliano Carnimeo	as Anthony Ascott	GDM / GDM 4119 / 2008
1971	The Lonely Violent Beach	Ernesto Gastaldi	a.k.a. Death Company	Digitmovies / CDDM246 / 2013
1971	Human Cobras	Bitto Albertini		Digitmovies / CDDM224 / 2012
1971	I Due Della F.1 Alla Corsa Più Pazza, Pazza Del Mondo	Osvaldo Civirani		Digitmovies / DGST012 / 2016
1971	The Iguana with the Tongue of Fire	Riccardo Freda		Digitmovies / CDDM069 / 2006
1971	Twitch of the Death Nerve	Mario Bava	a.k.a. A Bay Of Blood	Chris' Soundtrack Corner / CSC 022 / 2016
1971	Blindman	Ferdinando Baldi		Digitmovies / CDDM044 / 2005
1971	The Two Big Shots	Osvaldo Civirani		CAM / Digital / 2025
1971	Death Walks on High Heels	Luciano Ercoli		Digitmovies / CDDM056 / 2006
1971	The Devil Has Seven Faces	Osvaldo Civirani		Digitmovies / CDDM267 / 2014
1971	Deviation	José Ramón Larraz		Dagored / RED226 / 2016
1972	To Kill in Silence	Giuseppe Rolando		Quartet Records / QR189 / 2015
1972	Baron Blood	Mario Bava		Digitmovies / CDDM046 / 2005
1972	Execution Squad	Steno		Digitmovies / CDDM150 / 2009
1972	The Boldest Job in the West	José Antonio de la Loma	a.k.a. Nevada	GDM / CD CLUB 7114 / 2012
1972	Timanfaya (Amor Prohibido)	José Antonio de la Loma		Quartet Records / MS019 / 2013
1972	Return of Hallelujah	Giuliano Carnimeo	as Anthony Ascott	GDM / GDM 4119 / 2008
1972	The Killer Is on the Phone	Alberto De Martino		Digitmovies / CDDM212 / 2012
1972	Night Hair Child	James Kelley & Andrea Bianchi	a.k.a. What The Peeper Saw	Digitmovies / CDDM261 / 2014
1972	Master of Love	Brunello Rondi		Digitmovies / DGST 049 / 2021
1972	Il mio corpo con rabbia	Roberto Natale		CAM / Digital / 2025
1972	Tragic Ceremony	Riccardo Freda		Digitmovies / CDDM204 / 2012
1973	Put Your Devil into My Hell	Bitto Albertini		Digitmovies / DGST 049 / 2021
1973	The Countess Died of Laughter	Franz Antel		Digitmovies / DGST 049 / 2021
1973	Le mataf	Serge Leroy		GDM / GDM 4165 / 2013
1973	The Bloody Hands of the Law	Mario Gariazzo		Digitmovies / CDDM100 / 2007
1973	The Great Kidnapping	Roberto Infascelli		Cinevox / OSTPK 041 / 2021
1973	The Night of the Last Day	Adimaro Sala	a.k.a. La Notte Dell'Ultimo Giorno	Quartet Records / QR421 / 2020
1974	El Ultimo Viaje	José Antonio de la Loma		Chris' Soundtrack Corner / CSC 039 / 2023
1974	The Student Connection	Rafael Romero Marchent		Penta Music / PTM008 / 2018
1974	Emergency Squad	Stelvio Massi		Digitmovies / CDDM150 / 2009
1974	The Sons of White Fang	Maurizio Pradeaux		GDM / CD CLUB 7120 / 2012
1974	Processo Per Direttissima	Lucio De Caro		Quartet Records / QR421 / 2020
1974	What Have They Done to Your Daughters?	Massimo Dallamano		Cinevox / OSTPK 041 / 2021
1974	The Balloon Vendor	Mario Gariazzo	a.k.a. Last Moments	Digitmovies / SPDM007 / 2012
1974	Death Will Have Your Eyes	Giovanni d'Eramo		Beat Records Company / DDJ024 / 2013
1974	Rabid Dogs	Mario Bava		Chris' Soundtrack Corner / CSC 021 / 2016
1975	Blind Vendetta	José Antonio de la Loma		Chris' Soundtrack Corner / CSC 028 / 2018
1975	Evil Eye	Mario Siciliano	a.k.a. Malocchio / Eroticofollia	Digitmovies / CDDM165 / 2010
1975	The Great Adventure	Gianfranco Baldanello		GDM / GDM 4165 / 2013
1975	Killer Cop	Luciano Ercoli	a.k.a. The Police Can't Move	Cinevox / OSTPK 041 / 2021
1975	The Cursed Medallion	Massimo Dallamano	a.k.a. The Night Child	Digitmovies / CDDM165 / 2010
1975	Mark of the Cop	Stelvio Massi		Cinevox / CDOSTPK018 / 2016
1975	The 4 Of The Stonehearted Clan	Joaquín Luis Romero Marchent		Beat Records Company / BCM 9577 / 2016
1975	Sins Without Intentions	Theo Campanelli		Chris' Soundtrack Corner / CSC 038 / 2023
1975	The Angels with Bound Hands	Oscar Brazzi		Beat Records Company / BCM 9568 / 2015
1975	Second Spring	Ulli Lommel		Chris' Soundtrack Corner / CSC 026 / 2019
1975	Due Cuori, Una Cappella	Maurizio Lucidi		Quartet Records / QRMM009 / 2012
1975	Frankenstein - Italian Style	Armando Crispino		
1976	Where's Anna?	Piero Schivazappa		Digitmovies / SPDM014 / 2018
1976	Blondy	Sergio Gobbi	a.k.a. Vortex	Quartet Records / MS020 / 2013
1976	Colt 38 Special Squad	Massimo Dallamano		Digitmovies / CDDM284 / 2018
1976	Take All of Me	Luigi Cozzi		Quartet Records / QRSCE017 / 2010
1976	The Mistress Is Served	Mario Lanfranchi		Beat Records Company / DDJ005 / 2011
1976	Mark Strikes Again	Stelvio Massi		
1976	Deported Women of the SS Special Section	Rino Di Silvestro		
1976	Maria R. and the Angels of Trastevere	Elfriede Gaeng		Beat Records Company / BCM9575 / 2016
1976	The Two Orphans	Leopoldo Savona		
1977	Tentacles	Oliver Hellman	as "S.W. Cipriani"	Digitmovies / CDDM199 / 2011
1977	Stunt Squad	Domenico Paolella		
1977	Highway Racer	Stelvio Massi		Digitmovies / DGST024 / 2017
1977	Sister Emanuelle	Giuseppe Vari		
1977	The Marble Faun	Silverio Blasi		Digitmovies / SPDM006 / 2012
1977	Double Game	Carlo Ausino		
1977	The Perfect Killer	Mario Siciliano	as Marlon Sirko	Quartet Records / QR218 / 2016
1977	Dear Wife	Pasquale Festa Campanile		Quartet Records / QR531 / 2023
1978	Last Touch of Love	Filippo Ottoni	a.k.a. The Day Santa Claus Cried	Beat Records Company / BCM9534 / 2014
1978	Fearless	Stelvio Massi	a.k.a. Magnum Cop	Digitmovies / CDDM312 / 2020
1978	The Bermuda Triangle	René Cardona Jr.		Digitmovies / CDDM143 / 2009
1978	The Last Angels	Enzo Doria		Beat Records / DDJ032 / 2014
1978	The Wild Geese Attack Again	Mario Siciliano	a.k.a. Skin 'Em Alive	Chris' Soundtrack Corner / CSC 025 / 2018
1978	Bermuda: Cave of the Sharks	Tonino Ricci	as Anthony Richmond	Chris' Soundtrack Corner / CSC 018 / 2016
1978	Covert Action	Romolo Guerrieri		Chris' Soundtrack Corner / CSC 010 / 2011
1978	The Bloodstained Shadow	Antonio Bido		Digitmovies / CDDM099 / 2007
1978	Child of the Night	Sergio Gobbi	a.k.a. Enfantasme	Beat Records / DDJ013 / 2011
1978	Papaya, Love Goddess of the Cannibals	Joe D'Amato		Chris' Soundtrack Corner / CSC 006 / 2010
1978	Convoy Busters	Stelvio Massi		
1978	Target	Guido Zurli		Digitmovies / DGST019 / 2016
1978	Secret Day	Raimondo Del Balzo		
1979	The Concorde Affair	Ruggero Deodato	a.k.a. Concorde Affaire '79	Chris' Soundtrack Corner / CSC 012 / 2014
1979	Tough to Kill	Joe d'Amato		Digitmovies / DGST038 / 2019
1979	Encounters in the Deep	Tonino Ricci	as Anthony Richmond	Digitmovies / CDDM143 / 2009
1979	Midnight Blue	Raimondo Del Balzo		Digitmovies / DGST023 / 2017
1979	Lust	Raniero di Giovanbattista	as Jonas Rainer	Beat Records Company / DDJ021 / 2013
1979	From Maid to Lady	Vittorio De Sisti		Beat Records / DDJ027 / 2013
1979	Lady Lucifera	José Ramón Larraz		Quartet Records / QR269 / 2017
1979	Hunted City	Stelvio Massi		Digitmovies / CDDM306 / 2020
1979	The Great Alligator River	Sergio Martino		Chris' Soundtrack Corner / CSC 017 / 2015
1979	Ring of Darkness	Pier Carpi	as Peter Karp	Digitmovies / CDDM052 / 2006
1980	Orgasmo Nero	Joe D'Amato		Chris' Soundtrack Corner / CSC 014 / 2014
1980	The Rebel	Stelvio Massi		Digitmovies / CDDM228 / 2012
1980	The Iron Hand of the Mafia	Roberto Girometti		GDM / GDM 4311 / 2013
1980	Speed Driver	Stelvio Massi		Beat Records / DDJ018 / 2012
1980	Nightmare City	Umberto Lenzi		Quartet Records / QR484 / 2022
1980	The Garden of Eden	Yasuzô Masumura		Quartet Records / QRMM003 / 2011
1980	Desperate Moves	Ovidio G. Assonitis	a.k.a. The Rollerboy	Beat Records / DDJ020 / 2012
1981	Blue Paradise	Joe D'Amato	as Anna Bergman	Beat Records / DDJ022 / 2012
1981	Last Harem	Sergio Garrone	as Willy S. Regan	Quartet Records / QR174 /2015
1981	Vultures over the City	Gianni Siragusa		Chris' Soundtrack Corner / CSC 023 / 2017
1981	Piranha II: The Spawning	James Cameron & Ovidio G. Assonitis	as Steve Powder	Digitmovies / CDDM005 / 2003
1981	Pierino il fichissimo	Alessandro Metz		Beat Records / DDJ019 / 2012
1982	Pieces	Juan Piquer Simón		Gruppo Sugar / BOS 014 / 2016
1983	The House of the Yellow Carpet	Carlo Lizzani		
1983	Un povero ricco	Pasquale Festa Campanile	a.k.a. Rich and Poor	Digitmovies / CDDM217 / 2012
1984	A Man Called Rage	Tonino Ricci	as Anthony Richmond	Digitmovies / CDDM285 / 2018
1985	Baciami strega	Duccio Tessari	TV series	Digitmovies / CDDM328 / 2024
1987	Rage of Honor	Gordon Hessler		
1987	Beaks: The Movie	René Cardona Jr.		
1988	Night of the Sharks	Tonino Ricci		Digitmovies / CDDM189 / 2011
1988	Don Bosco	Leandro Castellani		Digitmovies / CDDM328 / 2024
1989	Bangkok ... Just Going	Fabrizio Lori		Universal Music / Digital Only
1989	Electric blue	Elfriede Gaeng		Universal Music / Digital Only / 2022
1991	Voices from Beyond	Lucio Fulci		Digitmovies / CDDM165 / 2010
1991	If I Didn't Have Love	Leandro Castellani		Digitmovies / CDDM328 / 2024
1993	The Anticrime Inspector	Paolo Fondato		Digitmovies / CDDM284 / 2018
1993	Over the Line	Ovidio G. Assonitis, Robert Barrett		Warner Chappell Music Italiana / 1992 / Digital Only
2000	Death, Deceit and Destiny Aboard the Orient Express	Mark Roper		Kronos Records / KRONCD079 / 2017
2001	Queen's Messenger	Mark Roper		Kronos Records / KRONCD085 / 2017
2001	She	Timothy Bond		Kronos Records / KRONCD071 / 2001
2002	Dog Story	Tiziana Aristarco		Warner Chappell Music Italiana / 2002 / Digital Only
2006	Bellissime 2	Giovanna Gagliardo		Heristal Entertainment / 2016 / Digital Only
