= Highway Racer =

- Directed by: Stelvio Massi
- Screenplay by: Gino Capone
- Story by: Gino Capone
- Produced by: Giovanni Di Clemente
- Starring: Maurizio Merli
- Cinematography: Richard Pallottini; Franco Delli Colli
- Edited by: Mauro Bonanni
- Music by: Stelvio Cipriani
- Production company: Cleminternazionale Cinematografica
- Distributed by: Titanus
- Release date: 10 August 1977 (Italy)
- Running time: 105 minutes
- Country: Italy
- Language: Italian
- Box office: ₤1.308 billion

Highway Racer (Italian: Poliziotto sprint) is a 1977 Italian poliziottesco film directed by Stelvio Massi. It was the first collaboration between Massi and Maurizio Merli, who worked together in six titles between 1977 and 1980.

== Plot ==
Marco Palma, a wild young police officer frequently ends up getting in hot water with his mentor, an older veteran cop.

== Cast ==
- Maurizio Merli as Marco Palma
- Angelo Infanti as Jean-Paul Dossena il "Nizzardo"
- Giancarlo Sbragia as Maresciallo Tagliaferri
- Lilli Carati as Francesca
- Orazio Orlando as Silicato
- Glauco Onorato as Pistone

== Production ==
Highway Racer was the first of six films starring Maurizio Merli that director Stelvio Massi directed between 1977 and 1980. When he was shooting his third film in the Mark the Cop series, Merli met Massi who was busy shooting Special Cop in Action for Marino Girolami. Highway Racer was shot on location in Rome.

== Release ==
Highway Racer was released in Italy on August 10, 1977, where it was distributed by Titanus. The film premiered at the Brancaccio cinema in Rome. It grossed a total of 1.308 billion Italian lira in Italy, which lead to Roberto Curti described as film being a "box office hit" in Italy.

== Reception ==
From contemporary reviews, Italian critics generally gave the film better reviews than the usual Italian crime films, with one critic describing it as "more amiable and astute than other films of its ilk, because it's more spectacular in its 'police and thieves on four wheels' game."
