= Weapons of Death =

- Italian film poster for Weapons of Death
- Directed by: Mario Caiano
- Screenplay by: Gianfranco Clerici; Vincenzo Mannino
- Story by: Gianfranco Clerici; Vincenzo Mannino
- Starring: Leonard Mann; Henry Silva; Jeff Blynn
- Cinematography: Pier Luigi Santi
- Edited by: Vincenzo Tomassi
- Music by: Francesco De Masi
- Distributed by: Fida Cinematografica
- Release date: 22 February 1977 (Italy)
- Running time: 99 minutes
- Country: Italy
- Box office: ₤1.049 billion

Weapons of Death (Italian: Napoli spara!, also known as Naples Shoots) is a poliziottesco film directed by Mario Caiano in 1977. It is spin-off from the Commissioner Betti Trilogy as the character of Gennarino (still played by Massimo Deda) returns from the film Violent Naples.

== Plot ==
In Naples, the young commissioner Antonio Belli, despite the good will and support of a special team, is unable to arrest the bandit Salvatore Santoro, sure of the protection of his godfather Don Alfredo Criscuolo, the Camorra boss who manages all the drug trade in the city. Not even the attempt to turn a rival gang against him leads to better results, and Santoro and his men continue to carry out several hits and spread terror in the city.

Finally captured and put in prison, Santoro escapes thanks to the intervention of the elderly boss. Inspector Belli is suspected by his superiors of friendship with the boss. The only way to frame Santoro will be to set a trap for him. In the end the Camorra member will be killed in a shootout at Naples Central Station.

== Cast ==
- Leonard Mann as Commissioner Belli
- Henry Silva as Santoro
- Jeff Blynn as Guidi
- Evelyne Stewart as Lucia Parisi
- Massimo Deda as Gennarino
- Adolfo Lastretti as Pedophile
- Kirsten Gille as Taxi Patron
- Mario Deda as Nardi, Belli's Assistant
- Enrico Maisto as Don Licata
- Tommaso Palladino as Don Calise
- Tino Bianchi as Don Alfredo
- Mario Erpichini as Chief of Police
- Maurizio Gueli as Serrao
- Massimo Vanni as Rosati
- Maurizio Mattioli as Special Agent

== Release ==
Weapons of Death was released in Italy on 22 February 1977 through the distributor Fida Cinematografica. It grossed a total of 1,049,324,370 Italian lira on its release.

== Reception ==
Regarding the film, Massimo Pepoli wrote in Il Messaggero (translated from Italian): "The little film, despite the banality of the plot, will not fail to satisfy fans of the genre, as it is full of action, blood and shootouts".

== Censorship ==
The film was denied a certificate in France in 1978, causing it to be banned from being screened in French theaters.

== Notes ==
=== References ===
- Curti, Roberto (2013). Italian Crime Filmography, 1968-1980. McFarland. ISBN 978-0786469765.
