= Emergency Squad =

Emergency Squad may refer to:

- Emergency medical services
- Emergency Squad (1940 film), an American adventure film
- Emergency Squad (1974 film), an Italian poliziottesco film
- Emergency SQUAD (2020 hip-hop group)
