= Poliziotteschi =

Genre of Italian crime films

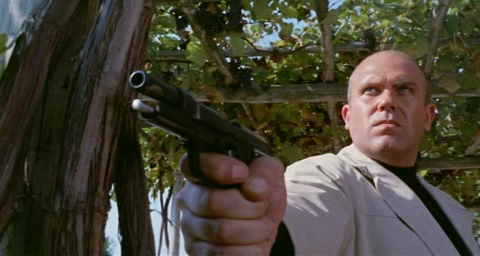
Gastone Moschin in Caliber 9 (1972), directed by Fernando Di Leo

Poliziotteschi (Italian: [polittsjotˈteski]; sing.: poliziottesco) constitute a subgenre of crime and action films that emerged in Italy in the late 1960s and reached the height of their popularity in the 1970s. They are also known as polizieschi all'italiana, Italo-crime, spaghetti crime films, or simply Italian crime films. Influenced primarily by both 1970s French crime films and gritty 1960s and 1970s American cop films and vigilante films (among other influences), poliziotteschi films were made amidst an atmosphere of socio-political turmoil in Italy known as Years of Lead and amidst increasing Italian crime rates. The films generally featured graphic and brutal violence, organized crime, car chases, vigilantism, heists, gunfights, and corruption up to the highest levels. The protagonists were generally tough working class loners, willing to act outside a corrupt or overly bureaucratic system.

== Etymology ==
In Italian, poliziesco is the grammatically correct Italian adjective (resulting from the fusion of the noun polizia ('police') and the desinence -esco ('related to'; akin to the English -esque) for police-related dramas, ranging from Ed McBain's police procedural novels to forensic science investigations. In Italian media, poliziesco is used generally to indicate every detective fiction production where police forces (Italian or foreign) are the main protagonists.

In English, the term poliziottesco – a fusion of the words poliziotto ('policeman') and the same -esco suffix – has prevailed over the more syntactically correct poliziesco all'italiana to indicate 1970s-era Italian-produced "tough cop" and crime movies. The prevalence of poliziottesco over poliziesco [all'italiana] closely follows the success of the term spaghetti Western over western all'italiana, being shorter and more vivid. In both instances, however, the term that has come to be used more frequently by English-speaking fans of the genre (poliziotteschi, spaghetti Westerns) was originally used pejoratively by critics, to denigrate the films themselves and their makers.

== History ==
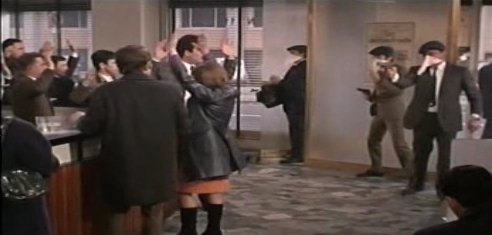
Bandits in Milan by Carlo Lizzani (1968)

Although the subgenre has its roots in Italian heist films of the late 1960s, such as Bandits in Milan (Banditi a Milano, 1968) by Carlo Lizzani, it was also strongly influenced by such rough-edged American police thrillers of the late 1960s and early 1970s as Bullitt, Dirty Harry, The French Connection, Magnum Force, and Serpico; the 1970s wave of American vigilante films, including 1974's Death Wish; the increase of cynicism and violence in French crime films; the resurgence of mob films in the wake of The Godfather; French and American noir and neo-noir films; and the rise of exploitation films in the late 1960s and 1970s. More generally, the genre was also heavily influenced by real-life crime and unrest in 1970s Italy during the period known as the anni di piombo (political violence, kidnappings, assassinations, bank robberies, political militant terrorism, impending oil crisis, political corruption, organized crime-related violence, and recession).

Just as American police films, American crime thrillers, and American vigilante films of the time focused on the crime waves and urban decline in the United States of the 1960s and 1970s, poliziotteschi were set in the context of, or directly addressed, the sociopolitical tumult and violence of Italy's anni di piombo, or the "Years of Lead", a period of widespread social unrest, political upheaval, labour unrest, rising crime, political violence, and political terrorism from the 1960s to 1980s. During this period, paramilitary and militant political terrorist groups, both on the far left (e.g. the Red Brigades) and far right (e.g. the neo-fascist Nuclei Armati Rivoluzionari) engaged in kidnappings, assassinations, and bombings (such as the Piazza Fontana bombing, the murder of former prime minister Aldo Moro, and 1980 Bologna train station bombing). At the same time, there was a period of especially violent conflict and disorder within the Sicilian Mafia, kicked off with the "First Mafia War" of the 1960s and culminating in the "Second Mafia War" of the early 1980s. Italian organized crime groups such as the Sicilian Mafia, the Camorra, and especially the Roman Banda della Magliana were actively involved in both criminal and political activities during this time, carrying out bombings and kidnappings, making deals with corrupt politicians, and forming strong ties to extreme far-right groups and neo-fascist terrorist organizations. Accordingly, poliziotteschi films such as Execution Squad (1972) often featured political extremists and paramilitary or terrorist groups alongside or in addition to the more commonly featured apolitical mafiosi and gangster criminal elements found in Italian crime films.

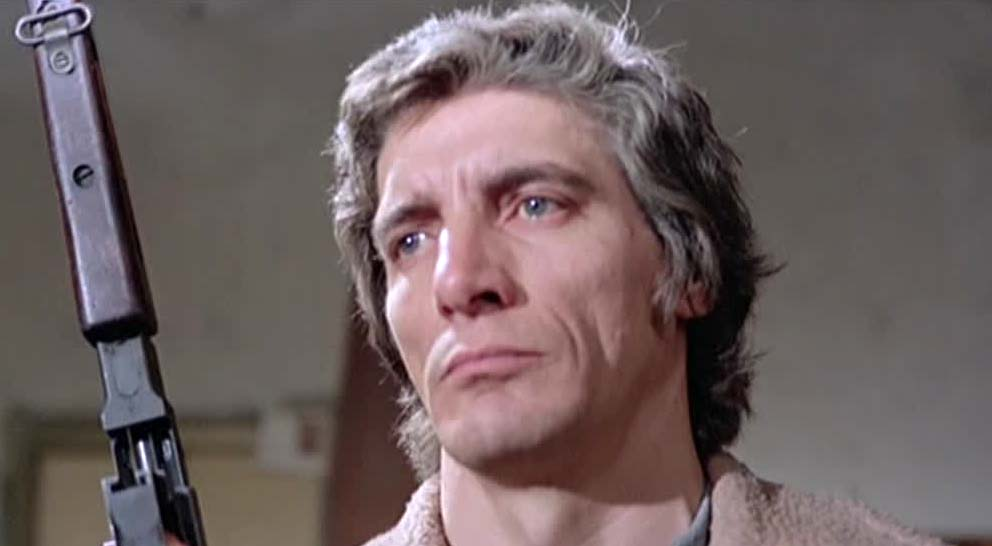
The Big Racket by Enzo G. Castellari (1976)

Due in part to the genre's often ostensibly negative portrayal of political activists and militants, especially leftist militants, and its seeming endorsement of vigilantism and "tough-on-crime" or "law and order" stances, some poliziotteschi films (such as 1976's The Big Racket) were criticized by then-contemporaneous critics and accused of exploiting conservative fears of rising crime and political upheaval while containing reactionary, pro-violence, or even quasi-Fascist ideological elements in their overarching message. These critiques were similar to those levelled at the 1970s American "vigilante films" of the same period, such as 1974's Death Wish, films by which the poliziotteschi genre was considerably influenced.

In retrospect, despite contemporaneous claims in the 1970s of overly conservative or reactionary themes within the genre, film historians such as Louis Bayman and Peter Bondarella contend that, in fact, poliziotteschi films generally presented a more multi-faceted, complex outlook on the political turmoil and crime waves of the time, as well as violence in general, with Bayman and author Roberto Curti in particular arguing that the genre generally used political conflicts and violence for largely apolitical tension-building and cathartic or emotional purposes rather than to promote any particular political agendas. Curti notes that the genre's protagonists often simultaneously displayed both right-wing and left-wing views, and protagonists were often working class while villains were often wealthy right-wing conservatives. The film Caliber 9 (1972), for instance, features protagonists of both right-wing and leftist ideologies and offers differing views on the causes of crime and the true antagonists of law-abiding Italian society, while Execution Squad reveals the actual antagonists of the film to be right-wing reactionary, "tough-on-crime" ex-police officers and vigilantes rather than the initially suspected leftist militants. Rather than explicitly supporting violence or vigilantism, the genre just as often displayed a morally ambiguous or aloof position on these themes, or even presented vigilantism and violence as a no-win situation. Though poliziotteschi films have been viewed by some critics as condemning a "liberal" or "weak" judiciary system as ineffectual in its treatment of criminals, the genre also suggests a more general distrust of authority, whether left-wing or right-wing, by portraying right-wing law enforcement, politicians and businessmen as hopelessly corrupt and manipulative. According to Bondarella, the "classic" poliziotteschi film reveals "almost universal suspicion of the very social institutions charged with protecting Italian society from criminal violence".

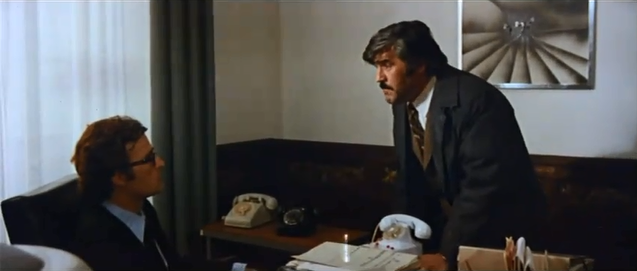
What Have They Done to Your Daughters? by Massimo Dallamano (1974)

With directors such as Fernando Di Leo and Umberto Lenzi and actors such as Maurizio Merli and Tomas Milian, poliziotteschi films became popular in the mid-1970s after the decline of Spaghetti Westerns and Eurospy genres. The subgenre lost its mainstream popularity in the late 1970s as Italian erotic comedy and horror films started topping the Italian box office.

Although based around crime and detective work, poliziotteschi should not be confused with the other popular Italian crime genre of the 1970s, the giallo, which, to English-speaking and non-Italian audiences, refers to a genre of violent Italian murder-mystery thriller-horror films. Directors and stars often moved between both forms, and some films could be considered under either banner, such as Massimo Dallamano's What Have They Done to Your Daughters? (1974).

The poliziottesco subgenre gradually declined in popularity during the late 1970s. Screenwriter Dardano Sacchetti, who was unhappy with what he deemed the genre's "fascistic" undertones, credits himself for "destroying it from the inside", by making it evolve into self-parody. By the end of the decade, the most successful films associated with the genre were crime-comedy pictures, which gradually evolved towards pure comedy.

=== Directors include ===
- Mario Bianchi
- Alfonso Brescia
- Enzo G. Castellari
- Bruno Corbucci
- Damiano Damiani
- Alberto De Martino
- Massimo Dallamano
- Ruggero Deodato
- Lucio Fulci
- Mario Caiano
- Marino Girolami
- Romolo Girolami
- Umberto Lenzi
- Fernando Di Leo
- Carlo Lizzani
- Sergio Martino
- Stelvio Massi
- Giuliano Montaldo
- Elio Petri
- Sergio Sollima
- Duccio Tessari

=== Actors include ===
- Mario Adorf
- Ursula Andress
- Carroll Baker
- Martin Balsam
- Laura Belli
- Helmut Berger
- Barbara Bouchet
- Sal Borgese
- Marcel Bozzuffi
- Charles Bronson
- Luciano Catenacci
- Adolfo Celi
- Giovanni Cianfriglia
- Joan Collins
- Richard Conte
- Joseph Cotten
- Alain Delon
- George Eastman
- Mel Ferrer
- Klaus Kinski
- Angelo Infanti
- Leonard Mann
- Luc Merenda
- Maurizio Merli
- Mario Merola
- Tomas Milian
- Gordon Mitchell
- Gastone Moschin
- Franco Nero
- Jack Palance
- Oliver Reed
- Fernando Rey
- Edward G. Robinson
- Luciano Rossi
- Antonio Sabàto Sr.
- Telly Savalas
- John Saxon
- Henry Silva
- Woody Strode
- Fabio Testi
- Massimo Vanni
- Gian Maria Volonté
- Eli Wallach
- Fred Williamson

== Selected films ==
- Wake Up and Die (Svegliati e uccidi, 1966)
- Bandits in Milan (Banditi a Milano, 1968)
- Detective Belli (Un Detective, 1969)
- Violent City (Città violenta, 1970)
- Investigation of a Citizen Above Suspicion (Indagine su un cittadino al di sopra di ogni sospetto, 1970)
- Execution Squad (La polizia ringrazia, 1972)
- Caliber 9 (Milano calibro 9, 1972)
- Manhunt (La mala ordina, 1972)
- Tony Arzenta (1973)
- High Crime (La polizia incrimina la legge assolve, 1973)
- The Violent Professionals (Milano trema: la polizia vuole giustizia, 1973)
- Revolver (1973)
- The Great Kidnapping (La polizia sta a guardare, 1973)
- The Boss (Il Boss, 1973)
- Gang War in Milan (Milano rovente, 1973)
- The Police Serve the Citizens? (La polizia è al servizio del cittadino?, 1973)
- Emergency Squad (Squadra volante, 1974)
- Street Law (Il cittadino si ribella, 1974)
- Almost Human (Milano odia: la polizia non può sparare, 1974)
- What Have They Done to Your Daughters? (La polizia chiede aiuto, 1974)
- Kidnap (Fatevi vivi, la polizia non interverrà, 1974)
- The Last Desperate Hours (Milano: il clan dei calabresi, 1974)
- Shoot First, Die Later (Il poliziotto è marcio, 1974)
- Killer Cop (La polizia ha le mani legate, 1975)
- Manhunt in the City (L'uomo della strada fa giustizia, 1975)
- Mark of the Cop (Mark il poliziotto, 1975)
- Mark Shoots First (Mark il poliziotto spara per primo, 1975)
- Gambling City (La città gioca d'azzardo, 1975)
- Kidnap Syndicate (La città sconvolta: caccia spietata ai rapitori, 1975)
- Silent Action (La polizia accusa: il Servizio Segreto uccide, 1975)
- Calling All Police Cars (a tutte le auto della polizia..., 1975)
- Syndicate Sadists (Il giustiziere sfida la città, 1975)
- Violent Rome (Roma violenta, 1975)
- Season for Assassins (Il tempo degli assassini, 1975)
- Violent Naples (Napoli violenta, 1976)
- Bloody Payroll (Milano violenta, 1976)
- Like Rabid Dogs (Come cani arrabbiati, 1976)
- A Special Cop in Action (Italia a mano armata, 1976)
- Cross Shot (La legge violenta della squadra anticrimine, 1976)
- Mister Scarface (l Padroni della città, 1976)
- Fear in the City (Paura in città, 1976)
- The Big Racket (Il grande racket, 1976)
- Strange Shadows in an Empty Room also known as Blazing Magnum (Una magnum special per Tony Saitta, 1976)
- Live Like a Cop, Die Like a Man (Uomini si nasce poliziotti si muore, 1976)
- Meet Him and Die (Pronto ad uccidere, 1976)
- The Tough Ones (Roma a mano armata, 1976)
- Colt 38 Special Squad (Quelli della Calibro 38, 1976)
- The Cynic, the Rat & the Fist (Il cinico, l'infame, il violento, 1977)
- Weapons of Death (Napoli spara!, 1977)
- The Heroin Busters (La via della droga, 1977)
- The Criminals Attack, The Police Respond (La malavita attacca, la polizia risponde!, 1977)
- A Man Called Magnum (Napoli si ribella, 1977)
- Double Game (Torino violenta, 1977)
- Beast with a Gun (La belva con mitra, 1977)
- Convoy Busters (Un poliziotto scomodo, 1978)
- Brothers Till We Die (La banda del gobbo, 1978)
- The Iron Commissioner (Il commissario di ferro, 1978)
- Blood and Diamonds (Diamanti sporchi di sangue, 1978)
- From Corleone to Brooklyn (Da Corleone a Brooklyn, 1979)
- Hunted City (Sbirro, la tua legge è lenta... la mia no!, 1979)
- Lust (Torino centrale del vizio, 1979)
- Speed Cross (1980)
- Tony: Another Double Game (Tony, l'altra faccia della Torino violenta, 1980)
- La tua vita per mio figlio (1980)
- The Warning (L'avvertimento, 1980)
- The Report Card (La pagella, 1980)
- Day of the Cobra (Il giorno del Cobra, 1980)
- Contraband (Luca il contrabbandiere, 1980)
- The Blue-Eyed Bandit (Il bandito dagli occhi azzurri, 1980)
- The Iron Hand of the Mafia (Mafia, una legge che non perdona, 1980)
- The Rebel (Poliziotto, solitudine e rabbia, 1980)
- Speed Driver (1980)
- Fear in the City (Cappotto di legno, 1981)
- The Mafia Triangle (Napoli, Palermo, New York - Il triangolo della camorra, 1981)
- Uomini di parola (1981)
- Vultures Over the City (Buitres sobre la ciudad or Avvoltoi sulla città, 1981)

=== Poliziotteschi comedy and parodies ===
- Stuntman (1968)
- Police Chief Pepe (Il commissario Pepe, 1969)
- The Funny Face of the Godfather (L'altra faccia del padrino, 1973)
- Flatfoot (Piedone lo sbirro, 1973)
- Italian Graffiti (Tutti figli di Mammasantissima, 1973)
- Piedino il questurino (1974)
- La mafia mi fa un baffo (1974)
- Flatfoot in Hong Kong (Piedone a Hong Kong, 1975)
- Loaded Guns (Colpo in canna, 1975)
- The Cop in Blue Jeans (Squadra antiscippo, 1976)
- Free Hand for a Tough Cop (Il trucido e lo sbirro, 1976)
- Hit Squad (Squadra antifurto, 1976)
- Swindle (Squadra antitruffa, 1977)
- Flatfoot in Africa (Piedone l'africano, 1978)
- Little Italy (Squadra antimafia, 1978)
- The Gang That Sold America (Squadra antigangsters, 1979)
- Assassination on the Tiber (Assassinio sul Tevere, 1979)
- Crime at Porta Romana (Delitto a Porta Romana, 1980)
- Flatfoot in Egypt (Piedone d'Egitto, 1980)
- Crime at the Chinese Restaurant (Delitto al ristorante cinese, 1981)
- Crime on the Highway (Delitto sull'autostrada, 1982)
- Crime in Formula One (Delitto in Formula Uno, 1984)
- Cop in Drag (Delitto al Blue Gay, 1984)

== See also ==
- Cinema of Italy
- Gangster film
- Mafia film
