= Tino Bianchi =

Italian actor (1905–1996)

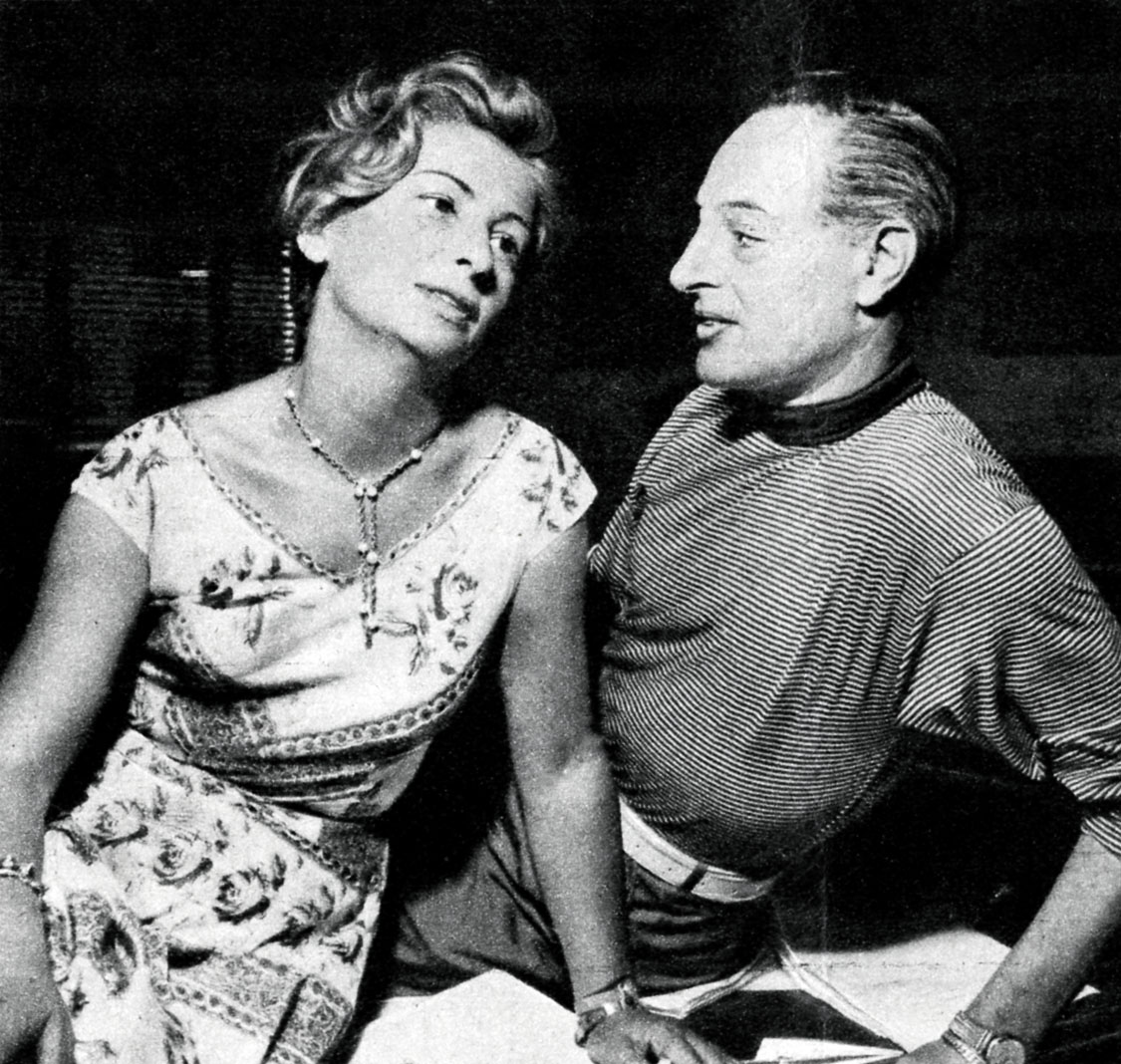
- Bianchi with the actress Diana Torrieri (1956)
- Born: 21 June 1905; São Paulo, Brazil
- Died: 4 January 1996 (aged 90); Rome, Italy
- Occupation: Actor
- Years active: 1933–1995

Tino Bianchi (21 June 1905 – 4 January 1996) was an Italian actor. He performed in more than fifty films between 1933 and 1995.

== Filmography ==
Film
Year	Title	Role	Notes
1933	Il treno delle 21,15		
1934	Si fa così		
1935	Il serpente a sonagli		
1935	L'avvocato difensore		
1936	Un bacio a fior d'acqua	Giorgio Carli	
1944	Squadriglia bianca	Michele	
1945	Trent'anni di servizio		
1953	The Walk	The Councillor	
1954	Senso	Il capitano Meucci	
1960	Black Sunday	Ivan, Manservant	
1960	The Hunchback of Rome		
1960	Il corazziere	Il colonnello dei carabinieri	
1960	Ferragosto in bikini	Il dott. Labianca	
1961	A Day for Lionhearts		
1961	Gold of Rome	Banker	
1962	Ulisse contro Ercole	King Ircano	
1964	Adolescenti al sole		
1965	Berlin, Appointment for the Spies	Doctor Van Dongen	
1966	Black Box Affair – Il mondo trema		
1966	Maigret a Pigalle	Blain	
1968	Chimera	Gynaecologist	
1969	Ora X – Pattuglia suicida	Professor	
1973	I Kiss the Hand	Pietro Gambara	
1973	We Want the Colonels	Onorevole Mazzante	
1973	The Great Kidnapping	Lawyer	
1974	Anno uno	Togliatti	
1975	...a tutte le auto della polizia	Police Commissioner	
1976	Fear in the City		
1977	Weapons of Death	Don Alfredo	
1984	Tutti dentro	Councillor Vanzetti	
1995	State Secret	Banker	(final film role)
