= Catene =

Catene may refer to:

- Catene (album), a 1984 album by Italian singer Mina
- Catene (1925 film), a 1925 Italian film
- Catene (1949 film), a 1949 Italian film
- Catene (1974 film), a 1974 Italian film
- Catene invisibili, a 1942 Italian film
