= Special Cop in Action =

- Directed by: Marino Girolami
- Screenplay by: Vincenzo Mannino; Gianfranco Clerici; Leila Buongiorno
- Story by: Vincenzo Mannino
- Starring: Maurizio Merli; Raymond Pellegrin; John Saxon
- Cinematography: Fausto Zuccoli
- Edited by: Vincenzo Tomassi
- Music by: Franco Micalizzi
- Production company: New Film Production
- Distributed by: Fida
- Release date: 27 November 1976 (Italy)
- Running time: 100 minutes
- Country: Italy

Special Cop in Action (Italian: Italia a mano armata, lit. 'Italy at gunpoint') is a 1976 Italian poliziottesco film directed by Marino Girolami, here credited as Franco Martinelli. The film is the final chapter in the Girolami's Commissioner Betti Trilogy, after Violent Rome and Violent Naples, though a spin-off in the series entitled Weapons of Death would be released the following year.

The main theme of the film was used in the soundtrack of Quentin Tarantino's Death Proof.

== Plot ==
A crime syndicate starts a crime wave in Turin, they rob a bank, taking a hostage to get away from Police Inspector Betti and Ferrari, his partner. However, the hostage turned out to be their accomplice in disguise. Later, they hijack a school bus full of children to use as ransom.

Betti and Ferrari sees through the syndicate's scheme and ambushes them on their next robbery attempt, arresting all but one armed criminal. The remaining criminal takes one of their unarmed mules as hostage, trying the trick they used last time. However Betti sees it through and closes in on them, refusing their demands for a getaway. The armed bandit gambles by releasing all other individuals in the bank to appear genuine, but the "customer" taken hostage was a career criminal known to the police and Betti. The police close in on them, forcing the crooks to give up.

The remaining criminals hide the schoolchildren in a nearby farm and lie low, but their cover is blown when one of the criminals try to rape a female cyclist nearby, leading Betti and the police close to in on them. They demand a large sum of cash and a getaway car, executing one child in the process. The child's mother, Anna, confronts Betti and blames him for her son's death. All other kids are released except the last one, Betti then offers to take the child's place to secure her release. The criminals agree and blindfolds him and take him away in the getaway car instead.

Betti is dumped on the highway and sustained injuries, impressed by his bravery, Anna visits him in the hospital and apologizes for her earlier comments. Betti then begins to round up the syndicate members, first chasing two of them through a wet market. The two crooks flee, but Betti hijacks a car and goes after them. After a lengthy chase, Betti destroys their car and arrests them. Another crook was chased by Betti across the rooftops, the crook panics and shoots him, nearly making Betti fall off the building. They then climb down the scaffolding, the crook tries to hijack a nearby car but was T-boned by a speeding truck, killing him.

Betti then goes to the syndicate headquarters, the local sailors' club in Turin. The criminals there set him up by having one of them shoot him. When Betti retaliates in self-defense, the criminals coming to aid the dead crook kicks away his gun and plays the victim card, framing Betti. Betti is then placed under arrest and is awaiting trial.

Anna visits Betti in detention and gives him courage. During a pre-engineered prison riot, the arrested syndicate members also in detention climbs over the wall to solitary confinement and tries to kill Betti, but was beaten down. With enough evidence against the syndicates, Betti had his charges dropped and was reinstated.

Betti and the police plan a major assault on the sailors' club. Leading to the death of many crooks, one of them escapes in a detective car, running over Ferrari in the process. Betti gives chase but was blocked by a piece of damaged scaffolding.

The boss of the syndicate prepares a meeting to consider the situation, but was run over by a biker gang as he prepares to board his limo. He was taken to a private hospital. Upon hearing the police are on their way, he escapes through a broken window and hails a taxi, with Betti following him. Being stalked at every turn and their arrests imminent, the remaining criminals gathers at the airport and prepares to flee Italy, with Betti watching their every move in a nearby car.

As revenge for taking down their operations, the syndicate orders a hit on Betti. While on a date with Anna, Betti was gunned down in a hail of bullets from a drive-by thus ending the trilogy story of Commissar Betti. However his death was not present in all versions of the film, leaving doubts on which ending is canon.

== Cast ==
- Maurizio Merli: Commissioner Betti
- John Saxon: Jean Albertelli
- Raymond Pellegrin: Commissioner Arpino
- Toni Ucci: Raffaele Cacace
- Mirella D'Angelo: Luisa
- Sergio Fiorentini: Salvatore Mancuso
- Aldo Barberito: Maresciallo Ferrari
- Massimo Vanni: Fabbri
- Enzo Andronico: Antonio Boretti
- Nello Pazzafini: Prisoner

== Production ==
Special Cop in Action is the final chapter in the trilogy about Commissioner Betti, after Violent Rome and Violent Naples.

== Release ==
Special Cop in Action was distributed theatrically in Italy by Fida on 27 November 1976.

== Reception ==
In a contemporary review, John Pym reviewed a dubbed version of the film in the Monthly Film Bulletin. Pym found the film to be an "over-plotted picture, filled with irrelevant characters (and character names), which attempts to justify its moments of thoroughly nasty (or thoroughly ludicrous) violence by the last-minute addition of the usual moral about the unhappiness of the policeman's lot".

== See also ==
- List of Italian films of 1976
