= Fearless (1978 film) =

- Film poster
- Directed by: Stelvio Massi
- Screenplay by: Gino Capone; Stelvio Massi
- Story by: Fulvio Gicca Palli
- Produced by: Silvio Siano; Nicola Venditti; Franz Antel
- Starring: Maurizio Merli; Joan Collins; Gastone Moschin; Werner Pochath
- Cinematography: Riccardo Pallottini
- Edited by: Mauro Bonanni
- Music by: Stelvio Cipriani
- Production companies: Promer; Neue Delta Film
- Distributed by: Fida (Italy)
- Release date: 3 February 1978 (Italy)
- Running time: 100 minutes
- Countries: Italy; Austria
- Box office: ₤1.146 billion

Fearless (Italian: Poliziotto senza paura) is a 1978 poliziottesco film directed by Stelvio Massi.

== Cast ==
- Maurizio Merli: Walter "Wally" Spada
- Joan Collins: Brigitte
- Gastone Moschin: Karl
- Werner Pochath: Strauss
- Annarita Grapputo: Annalise von Straben
- Alexander Trojan: Von Straben
- Jasmine Maimone: Renata
- Massimo Vanni: Benito
- Luciana Turina: Adele
- Franco Ressel: Dr. Zimmer
- Andrea Scotti: Inspector Nardelli

== Production ==
According to director Stelvio Massi, the film was inspired by the character of Philip Marlowe, who he tried to have Maurizio Merli imitate to make him "more human, less violent cop, somewhat different from those he had already successfully played." Merli stated that when the producer found out that Merli's character would only shoot his gun once in the film, he was told "Come on, he must be shooting like mad, or else nobody's going to watch this movie!"

Fearless was shot at Incir - De Paolis studios in Rome and on location in Vienna.

== Release ==
Fearless was distributed theatrically in Italy by Fida on February 3, 1978. It grossed a total of 1,146,557,460 Italian lire domestically. It was released in France and Greece on home video as Magnum Cop and in Sweden on home video as Fearless Fuzz, A Matter of Honour.
