= Giancarlo Badessi =

Italian actor (1928–2011)

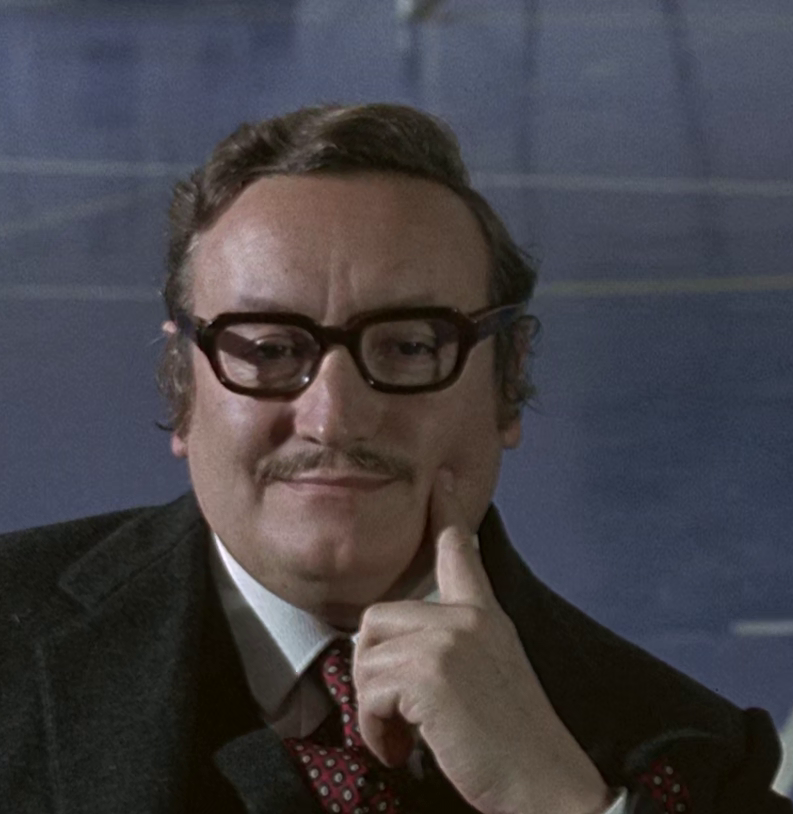
- Badessi in Confessions of a Police Captain (1971)
- Born: 21 September 1928; Lecco, Italy
- Died: 6 December 2011 (aged 83); Rome, Italy
- Occupation: Actor

Giancarlo Badessi (21 September 1928 – 6 December 2011) was an Italian actor.

== Life and career ==
Born in Lecco, at the age of almost 40 Badessi gave up his daily job as an accountant to embrace the theatre, making his debut in a stage play directed by Giancarlo Cobelli. He was also active in cinema and on television, often playing character roles.

Badessi died from a heart attack in Rome, on 6 December 2011, at the age of 83.

== Filmography ==
Year	Title	Role	Notes
1968	Gangsters '70		
1968	Ace High	Man with Moustache Promoting the Black Boxer	Uncredited
1969	Tepepa	Sergeant	
1969	Colpo di Stato	Man offering party	
1969	Where Are You Going All Naked?	Waiter	
1969	Night of the Serpent	Ignacio	
1969	Eat It	Pacetti	
1970	Satiricosissimo	Nerone	
1970	Fermate il mondo... voglio scendere!		
1971	Confessions of a Police Captain	On. Grisì	
1971	Roma Bene	Rossi	
1972	Monta in sella, figlio di…	General El Supremo	
1972	What Have You Done to Solange?	Mr. Erickson	
1972	Colpo grosso... grossissimo... anzi probabile		
1972	Poppea: A Prostitute in Service of the Emperor		
1972	Aretino's Blue Stories	Il precettore	
1972	The Grand Duel	Publican with Eyepatch	
1972	Confessioni segrete di un convento di clausura	Strangolagalli	
1973	Le mille e una notte... e un'altra ancora!	Husband of Gobeida	
1973	Daniele e Maria		
1973	Halleluja to Vera Cruz		
1973	Coronel Buttiglione	Commendatore	
1973	Giordano Bruno		
1974	Il gioco della verità		
1974	Innocence and Desire	The Rector of seminary	
1974	I'll Take Her Like a Father	Don Liguori	
1974	What Have They Done to Your Daughters?	Paglia's Lawyer	Uncredited
1974	Vermisat	Medico del pronto soccorso	
1974	The Profiteer	Priest	
1974	Il trafficone	Mayor	
1975	How to Kill a Judge	Sen. Derrasi	
1975	Mondo candido	Governatore spagnolo	
1975	Silent Action	Vittorio Chiarotti	
1975	Vergine e di nome Maria		
1975	Amore vuol dir gelosia	Don Ciro	
1975	Povero Cristo	Regista teatrale	
1976	Salon Kitty	Officer with Projector	
1976	Todo modo	Ventre	
1976	Hit Squad	The Sex Maniac on telephone	
1976	Born Winner	Head pastry chef	
1977	A Man Called Magnum	Avv. Cerullo	
1977	Black Journal	Lisa's friend	
1977	Swindle	Baruffaldi - the Atalanta supporter	
1978	Il figlio dello sceicco	Barnes	
1979	Caligula	Claudius	
1980	Action	Gay man in the sauna	
1982	Tiger Joe	Bronski	(final film role)
