= Il commissario di ferro =

- Directed by: Stelvio Massi
- Screenplay by: Roberto Gianviti
- Story by: Roberto Gianviti
- Produced by: Roberto Bessi; Renato Angiolini
- Starring: Maurizio Merli; Janet Agren; Ettore Manni; Chris Avram
- Cinematography: Sergio Rubini
- Edited by: Mauro Bonanni
- Music by: Lallo Gori
- Production company: Belma Cinematografica
- Distributed by: Variety Distribution
- Release date: 7 December 1978 (Italy)
- Running time: 85 minutes
- Country: Italy
- Language: Italian
- Box office: ₤847,768 million

Il commissario di ferro (transl. The Iron Commissioner is a 1978 Italian poliziottesco film directed by Stelvio Massi.

== Plot ==
Commissioner Mauro Mariani is known for his severity towards criminals and for his habit of acting on his own, which cost him the transition from Dr. Crivelli's mobile team to a simple neighborhood police station, where he can assist him. it's Brigadier Ingravallo.

One day, while Mariani is with his wife Vera and his son Claudio, from whom he usually lives separated, a boy named Sergio Conforti bursts into his office and, holding an officer under the gun, forces him to call the absent commissioner because he wants to kill, considering him guilty of his father's suicide, arrested by Mariani two years earlier. The commissioner finds out about it when Vera and Claudio, having gone to the office to wait for him, end up in the hands of Conforti.

The boy, in a delirium of revenge, takes the child with him and later telephones the inspector asking him to pick him up where and when he knows. Initially Mariani does not understand the message; then, reconstructing the arrest of Sergio's father, he ends up remembering. He is forced to evade the surveillance of Crivelli and, arriving near a railway yard, is forced to face Sergio: he will be able to neutralize him and, even if wounded, to save his son.

== Cast ==
- Maurizio Merli as Commissioner Mauro Mariani
- Janet Agren as Vera Mariani
- Ettore Manni as Sergeant Ingravallo
- Chris Avram as Commissioner Capo Crivelli
- Mariangela Giordano as Mrs. Parolini
- Enzo Fiermonte as The Engineer
- Elisa Mainardi as Concierge

== Production ==
Maurizio Merli later described the film as "a movie made out of nothing" and that the director Stelvio Massi was not happy with the results. Merli stated that half way through production the producers went on set and said there was no money left and they had to complete production quickly.

== Release ==
Il comissario di ferro was distributed theatrically in Italy by Belma on 7 December 1978. The film grossed a total of 847,768,660 Italian lire. Unlike Massi's other film of the period, the film was never dubbed into English for foreign markets.

== See also ==
- List of Italian films of 1978

== Notes ==
=== References ===
- Curti, Roberto (2013). Italian Crime Filmography, 1968-1980. McFarland. ISBN 978-0786469765.
