= Cross Shot =

- Directed by: Stelvio Massi
- Screenplay by: Lucio De Caro; Piero Poggio; Maurizio Mengoni; Dardano Sacchetti
- Story by: Lucio De Caro
- Starring: John Saxon; Lee J. Cobb; Renzo Palmer; Rosanna Fratello
- Cinematography: Mario Vulpiani
- Edited by: Mauro Bonanni
- Music by: Piero Pintucci
- Production company: P.A.C.-Produzioni Atlas Consorziate
- Distributed by: P.A.C.
- Release date: 14 April 1976 (Italy)
- Running time: 92 minutes
- Country: Italy
- Box office: ₤654,940 million

Cross Shot (Italian: La legge violenta della squadra anticrimine) is a 1976 Italian poliziottesco film directed by Stelvio Massi.

== Plot ==
Commissioner Jacovella is a hasty and decisive but fundamentally honest police officer, and sometimes indulges in unorthodox methods to carry out his job as Head of the City Mobile Squad. For this reason he is disliked by the journalists of the city and reciprocates the same sentiment towards them. Jacovella's wife is a witness in a trial against the brother of the local boss of the Sacra Corona Unita Dante Ragusa and is threatened by his henchmen so as not to let her testify. The trial ends with the acquittal of the accused and with the commissioner who publicly takes it out on the journalists present. The situation in the city is tense.

Antonio Blasi, a young boy without a job, needs money to be able to go to live with his girlfriend Nadia and marry her, so he decides to participate in a robbery of a security van. But something goes wrong, the robbery is foiled, the driver of the gang killed and the rest of the robbers engage in a shooting with the police officer on guard outside the Bank. Blasi, who has never shot a man, is forced by the other robbers to kill the policeman who was trying to stop them. Confused and stunned by the shock of killing the young agent, he escapes on foot.

While the other two robbers manage to steal a car and escape making another victim (the woman who owns the car), Blasi still runs scared and in a crisis of conscience through the streets of the city, until he stops a car and forces the driver to get off. Unfortunately, the car belongs to Pasquale Ragusa, brother of a respected mafia boss and blind person in the area, who was transporting some burning documents back from Rome, including a letter from a corrupt Minister in exchange for easy building permits in the city. .

Blasi thus, in addition to being wanted by the police for murder, has wronged the boss Dante Ragusa who obviously wants him dead and orders his men to capture him, who in looking for him will kill his father by throwing him into a millstone. The boy escapes with his girlfriend to a country farm that belonged to his grandfather and now uninhabited, chased by the killers of the Ragusa boss, who intercept him near Castel del Monte and where they try to kill him. Blasi in the clash with the killers has the upper hand and gets rid of them by killing one. The escape continues. Meanwhile Giacomo Maselli, director of the local newspaper La Gazzetta del Mezzogiorno, is one of the journalists who cannot stand the violent methods of the police, especially Commissioner Jacovella, discovers the identity of the policeman's killer in the robbery, collects his confession and understands his repentance and try to help him.

Commissioner Jacovella, having read the news with the revelations on Blasi's identity in the newspaper, pawns Maselli and saves him from an attack that Pasquale Ragusa was preparing for the journalist, one of the agents shoots and kills Pasquale Ragusa and saves Maselli. The investigation continues and the commissioner shows up at the funeral of the Boss's brother, making him go into a rage for the gesture, considered of little respect.

Maselli and Antonio Blasi's girlfriend, who did not abandon him despite knowing about the murder, manage to convince the boy to turn himself in, since at this point he has only one way out, also because he found and read the letter from the Corrupt minister to boss Ragusa and they know he wouldn't have a long life around the city. Maselli informs the commissioner that the boy will deliver himself to the newspaper office that same evening. At the moment of delivery in front of the gates of the Gazzetta del Mezzogiorno, a sniper of the Ragusa boss shoots Blasi with a sniper rifle. The boy dies in the arms of his girlfriend and under the eyes of Maselli and Jacovella but not before they have come into possession of the letter that reveals the contact between the corrupt Minister and Ragusa, a document that will allow the official to go and arrest the boss.

== Cast ==
- John Saxon as Commissioner Jacovella
- Lee J. Cobb as Boss Dante Ragusa
- Renzo Palmer as Maselli
- Lino Capolicchio as Antonio Blasi
- Rosanna Fratello as Nadia
- Antonella Lualdi as Anna Jacovella
- Thomas Hunter as Agent Turini
- Giacomo Piperno as Giordani
- Guido Celano as Father of Antonio Blasi

== Production ==
Cross Shot was shot on location in Bari and Trani.

== Release ==
Cross Shot was distributed theatrically in Italy by P.A.C. on 14 April 1976. It was released on DVD in Italy by Cecchi Gori Home Video. The film grossed a total of 654,940,070 Italian lire domestically on its theatrical release.

== Reception ==
From contemporary reviews, Martyn Auty reviewed a 95-minute English-dubbed version of the film in the Monthly Film Bulletin. Auty found the film to be "cheap propaganda for the law-and-order lobby. In teo wealry indicative scnes, Jacovella is shown at home with his wife and child, and administering on-the-spot 'corrective' punishment to a young vandal. The newspaper, on the other hand, is cast as a obstacle to the pursuit of Jacovella's tough justice, and the Mafia is presented as politically non-aligned, unproblematic (their actions merely the product of Ragusa's evil business". Auty also commented on the acting, stating that Cobb had a "sluggish performance" while director Stelvio Massi "does what is required of him, propelling the action perfunctorily from gun battle to car chase."

== See also ==
- List of Italian films of 1976
