= Violent Naples =

- Directed by: Umberto Lenzi
- Screenplay by: Vincenzo Mannino
- Story by: Vincenzo Mannino
- Produced by: Fabrizio De Angelis
- Starring: Maurizio Merli; John Saxon; Barry Sullivan
- Cinematography: Fausto Zuccoli; Sebastiano Celeste
- Edited by: Vincenzo Tomassi
- Music by: Franco Micalizzi
- Production company: Pan-European Production Pictures
- Release date: 7 August 1976 (Italy)
- Running time: 95 minutes
- Country: Italy
- Box office: ₤2.047 billion

Violent Naples (Italian: Napoli violenta) is a 1976 poliziottesco film directed by Umberto Lenzi. It starred Maurizio Merli, John Saxon and Barry Sullivan, and was the first sequel to Violent Rome and the second entry into the Commissioner Betti Trilogy. Saxon appeared in several such movies.

== Plot ==
Commissioner Betti (Maurizio Merli) is transferred to Naples, receiving on his arrival a warm welcome from The Commandante (Barry Sullivan), the city's crime lord. Betti goes on a personal mission against corruption and organized crime, trying to force the syndicate out of town by any means necessary.

== Cast ==
- Maurizio Merli as Commissioner Betti
- John Saxon as Francesco Capuano
- Barry Sullivan as Camorra Boss 'O Generale
- Elio Zamuto as Franco Casagrande
- Silvano Tranquilli as Paolo Gervasi
- Maria Grazia Spina as Gervasi's wife
- Guido Alberti as Superintendent
- Tom Felleghy as Commissioner in Genoa

== Release ==
Violent Naples was released in Italy on 7 August 1976, where it was distributed by Fida Cinematografica. It had a domestic gross of 2,046,936,220 Italian lire. In the United Kingdom the film was released as Death Dealers. The film was followed by Special Cop in Action, the final film in the Commissioner Betti trilogy.

== Reception ==
The Monthly Film Bulletin described the film as a "nasty, brutish and over-long escapade" that was plagiarizing Dirty Harry. The review found the film to be "lacklustre in style, without a trace of tension to its slam-bang action".

== See also ==
- List of Italian films of 1976

== Notes ==
=== References ===
- Curti, Roberto (2013). Italian Crime Filmography, 1968-1980. McFarland. ISBN 978-0786469765.
