= Execution Squad =

- Directed by: Steno
- Screenplay by: Lucio De Caro; Steno
- Story by: Lucio De Caro; Steno
- Produced by: Roberto Infascelli; Peter Geissler
- Starring: Enrico Maria Salerno; Mariangela Melato; Franco Fabrizi; Cyril Cusack
- Cinematography: Riccardo Pallottini
- Edited by: Roberto Perpignani; Jutta Brandstaedter
- Music by: Stelvio Cipriani
- Production companies: Primex Italiania; Dieter Geissler Filmproduktion
- Distributed by: P.A.C.
- Release dates: 25 February 1972 (Italy); 17 November 1972 (West Germany)
- Running time: 99 minutes
- Countries: Italy; West Germany
- Box office: ₤1.696 billion

Execution Squad (Italian: La polizia ringrazia) is a 1972 crime film directed by Steno and starring Enrico Maria Salerno. Set during Italy's tumultuous anni di piombo ("Years of Lead"), the film obtained a great commercial success.

== Cast ==
- Enrico Maria Salerno as Commissioner Bertone
- Mariangela Melato as Sandra
- Franco Fabrizi as Francesco Bettarini
- Cyril Cusack as Former Superintendent Stolfi
- Mario Adorf as Deputy Prosecutor Ricciuti
- Laura Belli as Anna Maria Sprovieri
- Jürgen Drews as Michele Settecamini
- Corrado Gaipa as Lawyer Armani

== Plot ==
Commissioner Bertone is an upright officer in a Rome over-run by crime. Due to a justice system which protects the rights of suspects and citizens against the police, many crimes go unpunished with convictions not being obtained the criminals ending up back on the streets. However, some of the released criminals turn up dead. Bertone discovers an organized group of vigilantes are dealing with the criminals the police cannot obtain convictions for. A young criminal on the run after a bungled robbery costs the lives of two citizens is the syndicate's next victim, followed by an older criminal. The vigilantes start to target prostitutes and homosexuals active on the streets at night, as well as a trade union leader who was accused of killing a policeman during a riot, and even a criminal in custody. Bertone tries to bring the second kid involved in the robbery to justice legally, but the self-appointed executioners are closing in and his own officers are sympathetic to the 'clean up squad'.

== Style ==
Italian film historian Roberto Curti stated that many critics have consider Execution Squad to be the initiator of the "poliziottesco" film genre. Curti opined that Execution Squad was just a logical continuation of Damiano Damiani's Confessions of a Police Captain. The film is credited to Stefano Vanzina, the first time in his career that Vanzina had abandoned his usual credit of Steno which he had used since 1949. The film is also a drastic change from Steno's usual output which consisted primarily of comedy films.

== Production ==
The script and story were written by Lucio De Caro and Steno. Steno stated that the script was originally written for a different director, but "back then my colleagues were afraid to speak ill of the police". The lead role in the film was given to Enrico Maria Salerno, but was originally offered to Lando Buzzanca, one of Italy's most famous comedians at the time. The film was shot at Centro Incom in Rome and on location in Rome.

== Release ==
Execution Squad was released in Italy on 25 February 1972 where it was distributed by P.A.C. It grossed a total of 1,696,360,000 Italian lire on its domestic release. Curti described the film as an unexpected box office hit in Italy. It was released in West Germany on 17 November 1972 as Das Syndikat.

== See also ==
- List of Italian films of 1972

== Footnotes ==
=== References ===
- Curti, Roberto (2013). Italian Crime Filmography, 1968-1980. McFarland. ISBN 978-0786469765.
- Mathijs, Ernest; Mendik, Xavier (2004). Alternative Europe. Wallflower Press.
- Chiti, Roberto; Poppi, Roberto; Pecorari, Mario (1991). Dizionario del cinema italiano: I film (in Italian). Gremese Editore.
- Curti, Roberto (2006). Italia odia: il cinema poliziesco italiano. Lindau.
