= Giovanni Di Clemente =

Italian TV and film producer (1948–2018)

Giovanni Di Clemente (5 February 1948 in – 2 January 2018) was an Italian television and film producer.

Born in Rome, Di Clemente won two David di Donatello Awards, in 1986 the award for best producer thanks to Mario Monicelli's Let's Hope It's a Girl a special David and in 1996 for his overall production work. He died on 2 January 2018 in Rome, aged 69.

== Selected filmography ==
- 1974 - Drama of the Rich
- 1977 - Highway Racer
- 1980 - Delitto a Porta Romana
- 1980 - Il ficcanaso
- 1980 - Speed Cross
- 1981 - Odd Squad
- 1983 - Conquest
- 1983 - Segni particolari: bellissimo
- 1985 - Mamma Ebe
- 1986 - Let's Hope It's a Girl
- 1987 - Devils of Monza
- 1988 - The Rogues
- 1989 - 'O Re
- 1989 - Street Kids
- 1990 - Dark Illness
- 1992 - Close Friends
- 1992 - Parenti serpenti
- 1993 - Giovanni Falcone
- 1995 - Looking for Paradise
- 1997 - The Game Bag
- 1998 - Of Lost Love
- 1999 - A Respectable Man
- 1999 - Dirty Linen
- 1999 - Illuminata
