= Hunted City =

- Directed by: Stelvio Massi
- Screenplay by: José Sanchez; Marino Girolami
- Story by: José Sanchez; Marino Girolami; Vincenzo Mannino
- Starring: Maurizio Merli
- Cinematography: Pier Luigi Santi
- Edited by: Mauro Bonannni
- Music by: Stelvio Cipriani
- Production company: 3C Cooperativa Cinematografica
- Distributed by: Simba Film
- Release date: 27 September 1979 (Italy)
- Running time: 103 minutes
- Country: Italy
- Box office: ₤329 million

Hunted City (Italian: Sbirro, la tua legge è lenta... la mia no! lit. 'Cop...Your Law is Slow, Mine Isn't!') is a 1979 Italian poliziottesco film directed by Stelvio Massi. It represents one of the few negative roles for Merola.

== Production ==
Hunted City was the fifth collaboration between actor Maurizio Merli and director Stelvio Massi. The film was shot at Incet-de Paolis in Milan and on location in Milano.

== Cast ==
- Maurizio Merli: Commissioner Paolo Ferro
- Mario Merola: Raffaele Acampora
- Carmen Scarpitta: Ferro's sister
- Francisco Rabal: don Alfonso
- Massimo Dapporto: Stefano

== Release ==
Hunted City was distributed theatrically in Italy by Simba Film on 27 September 1979. The film grossed a total of 329 million Italian lire domestically.

== See also ==
- List of Italian films of 1979
