= The Rebel (1980 Italian film) =

- Directed by: Stelvio Massi
- Screenplay by: Boschi Huber; Art Bernd; Massimo De Rita; Stelvio Massi
- Story by: Boschi Huber; Massimo de Rita
- Produced by: Salvatore Smeriglio; Artur Brauner
- Starring: Maurizio Merli; Jutta Speidel; Francisco Rabal
- Cinematography: Pier Luigi Santi
- Music by: Stelvio Cipriani
- Production companies: Simba Film; C.C.C. Filmkunst
- Distributed by: Medusa (Italy)
- Release dates: 22 August 1980 (Italy); 20 February 1981 (West Germany)
- Running time: 102 minutes
- Countries: Italy; West Germany
- Box office: ₤508 million

The Rebel (Italian: Poliziotto, solitudine e rabbia, lit. 'Cop, solitude and anger') is a 1980 poliziottesco film directed by Stelvio Massi.

== Cast ==
- Maurizio Merli as Nicola
- Jutta Speidel as Vivien
- Francisco Rabal as Tony
- Arthur Brauss as Klaus Beitz
- Reinhard Kolldehoff as Hermann Stoll

== Production ==
The Rebel was shot at CCC Filmkunst in Berlin and on Location in Formello, Venice and Berlin. Merli spoke about the film stating that his crew and him "left for Germany in January 1980. It was amazing to shoot in Berlin stadium where Hitler used to deliver his speeches to the masses, especially since it was a gloomy day, with the sky completely covered with clouds. I had shivers watching the field completely covered with white snow, and all around the black marble that the stadium was built of."

The film was made under the original title Poliziotto solitudine e rabbia. The Italian version of the film was edited by Mauro Bonanni while the German version was edited by Sybille Windt.

== Release ==
The Rebel was distributed in Italy by Medusa on 22 August 1980 with a 102 minute running time. The film grossed a total of 508 million Italian lira. It was released in West Germany on 20 February 1981 with an 87 minute runtime as Knallharte Profis. It was released on home video on VHS in Italy by AVO and as Il rebelle by Eureka.
