= Masterstroke =

Masterstroke may refer to:

- Master Stroke, Italian crime film
- "Masterstroke of Malevolence", episode of Fillmore!
