= The Balloon Vendor =

1974 film

- Film poster
- Directed by: Mario Gariazzo
- Written by: Mario Gariazzo; Armando Novelli; Massimo Franciosa; Luisa Montagnana
- Produced by: Armando Novelli
- Starring: Renato Cestiè; James Whitmore; Lee J. Cobb
- Cinematography: Claudio Racca
- Edited by: Amedeo Giomini
- Music by: Stelvio Cipriani
- Release date: 1974
- Running time: 96 minutes
- Country: Italy
- Language: Italian

The Balloon Vendor (Italian: Il venditore di palloncini, also released as Last Moments and The Last Circus Show) is a 1974 Italian drama film directed by Mario Gariazzo and starring James Whitmore.

== Cast ==
- Renato Cestiè as Giacomino
- Lee J. Cobb as Vent'anni
- Adolfo Celi as Professor
- James Whitmore as Antonio
- Cyril Cusack as Balloon Vendor
- Marina Malfatti as Maria
- Maurizio Arena as Romolo
- Lina Volonghi as Sister Maria
- Silvano Tranquilli as Doctor
- Gianni Agus as Circus manager
- Umberto D'Orsi as Taxi Driver
- Carlo Romano as Security guard
- Giustino Durano as Doorman
- Alfredo Adami as Alfredo
- Pupo De Luca as Antique dealer
