= Maurizio Amati =

Italian film producer

- Born: 23 December 1944 (age 81); Rome, Italy
- Occupation: Film producer
- Years active: 1965–present

Maurizio Amati (born 23 December 1944) is an Italian film producer. He has produced films since 1965. He was born in Rome, Italy. His main activity in the world of filmmaking is a filmmaker; he also played the role of producer in Alessio Maria Federici's 2014 film, Fratelli Unici.

== Selected filmography ==
- For a Few Extra Dollars (1965)
- Master Stroke (1967)
- High Crime (1973)
- Holocaust 2000 (1977)
