= Due assi per un turbo =

Italian-Hungarian television series

Due assi per un turbo was an Italian-Hungarian TV series portrayed in 12 one-hour episodes. It was produced by RAI from 1984-1987 and broadcast by Rai Uno in 1987. The series was created by Luciano Perugia, and was inspired by the Brazilian sitcom Carga Pesada (1979).

Stelvio Massi directed most of the episodes, which were written by Tonino Valerii; the score was composed by Detto Mariano.

== Plot ==
The plot revolves around two truckers, Franco (Renato D'Amore) and Vanni (Christian Frémont) and their rig, an Iveco 190-42 Turbostar named Gambero Rosso (Red Prawn in English). Recurring characters are Orazio (Philippe Leroy and Giò (Alba Mottura).

The series featured some notable guest stars like Adolfo Celi, Giulio Scarpati and William Berger.

== Production ==
Most of the scenes were shot in South Tyrol, in Sterzing and near Bolzano, but the series was one of the first produced for the Italian television to use many foreign locations, ranging from Moscow, Tunisia, Poland and Spain.

Some of the car chases were staged by the famous stunt driver Rémy Julienne.

The first and only season was made of two different short seasons: the first, episodes 1 to 3, was shot as a pilot, and featured a different truck (an earlier model, the Iveco 190-38 Special), later changed to the titular TurboStar for the official production. The two short seasons were later joined and sold as one.

The name of the series was to be T.I.R., and was changed after the shooting of the first three episodes. (In Hungary, it remained so.)

FIAT was heavily involved in the production, using the serial as a product placement for the brands of the group (mostly Iveco, Fiat Auto and Alfa Romeo). Agip made product placement in some episodes, too.

== Reception ==
The show was very well received, and a second season was in pre-production but was ultimately cancelled. Some of the episodes are now occasionally transmitted in RAI TV channels or at late night.

== Title ==
The show title is based on a pun: in Italian language assi means both a couple of skilled and brave men (aces) and the axles of a vehicle. The turbo of the title is the Turbostar truck, at the time a very popular and common model made by the Italian manufacturer Iveco.
