= Massimo Vanni =

Italian film and television actor

- Born: 8 July 1946 (age 79); Rome
- Other names: Alex McBride
- Occupations: Stuntman; actor
- Relatives: Enzo G. Castellari (cousin)

Massimo Vanni (born 8 July 1946) is an Italian stuntman and actor.

== Life and career ==
Born in Rome, Vanni started his career as a stuntman, and had his first roles of weight playing tough guys in several poliziotteschi films directed by his cousin, the director Enzo G. Castellari. He is mostly known for the role of Gargiulo, a comical sidekick of Tomas Milian in the "Inspector Girardi" film series directed by Bruno Corbucci. In the 1980s he also played several leading roles in a number of action and adventure films, often directed by Bruno Mattei and in which he was credited as Alex McBride.

== Filmography ==
- Sartana's Here… Trade Your Pistol for a Coffin (1970)
- Street Law (1974)
- Emanuelle's Revenge (1975)
- Violent Rome (1975)
- Rome: The Other Side of Violence (1976)
- The Big Racket (1976)
- A Special Cop in Action (1976)
- The Heroin Busters (1977)
- Destruction Force (1977)
- Swindle (1977)
- Fearless (1978)
- Hit Squad (1978)
- The House by the Edge of the Lake (1978)
- Little Italy (1978)
- The Face with Two Left Feet (1979)
- Assassinio sul Tevere (1979)
- The Last Hunter (1980)
- Day of the Cobra (1980)
- Delitto a Porta Romana (1980)
- Crime at the Chinese Restaurant (1981)
- The New Barbarians (1983)
- Escape from the Bronx (1983)
- Crime in Formula One (1984)
- Rats: Night of Terror (1984)
- Zombi 3 (1988)
- Robowar (1988)
- Strike Commando 2 (1988)
- After Death (1989)
- A Pure Formality (1994)
- Wax Mask (1997)
