= The Heroin Busters =

1977 film

- Directed by: Enzo G. Castellari
- Screenplay by: Massimo de Rita; Enzo G. Castellari
- Story by: Galliano Juso; Massimo de Rita
- Produced by: Galliano Juso
- Starring: Fabio Testi; David Hemmings
- Cinematography: Giovanni Bergamini
- Edited by: Gianfranco Amicucci
- Music by: Goblin
- Production company: Cinemaster
- Distributed by: Titanus
- Release date: 13 August 1977 (Italy)
- Running time: 100 minutes
- Country: Italy
- Box office: ₤1,308 billion

The Heroin Busters (Italian: La via della droga) is a 1977 Italian crime film directed by Enzo G. Castellari and starring Fabio Testi, David Hemmings and Sherry Buchanan.

== Production ==
The Heroin Busters was director Enzo G. Castellari's last crime film of the 1970s. The film was shot in Rome, Genoa, Cartagena, Amsterdam and New York.

The score of the film was provided by the Italian progressive rock group Goblin who had just written their score for Dario Argento's film Suspiria. The score is composed of funk, psychedelia, and rock music.

== Cast ==
- Fabio Testi as Fabio
- David Hemmings as Mike Hamilton
- Sherry Buchanan as Vera
- Wolfango Soldati as Gilo
- Massimo Vanni as Massimo
- Angelo Ragusa as Dealer
- Romano Puppo as Gianni's Assassin
- Sergio Ruggeri as Sergio
- Joshua Sinclair as Gianni, the boss

== Release ==
The Heroin Busters was released in Italy on August 13, 1977. It was distributed by Titanus and grossed 1,308,550,110 Italian lira. Roberto Curti, author of Italian Crime Filmography, 1968-1980 described the box office gross as performing "moderately well", but not as well as expected.

It was released on DVD by Blue Underground on April 25, 2006.

== Reception ==
Among modern reviews, AllMovie gave the film three stars out of five, referring to it as "a stylish and fast-paced entry into the Italian crime genre that hits all the right marks for genre fans." as well as noting "The one real defect of La Via Della Droga is that it lacks a human story element to get the viewer emotionally involved but Castellari makes up for that oversight by keeping the story taut and fast-paced." Roberto Curti, author of Italian Crime Filmography, 1968-1980, compared the film Casterllari's The Big Racket, stating that unlike that film "the result is a cold, technically impeccable yet overindulgent formalist exercise in style" that contained a "comic book-style script, populated by dull characters"

== See also ==
- List of Italian films of 1977
- List of crime films of the 1970s
