= The Great Kidnapping =

- Directed by: Roberto Infascelli
- Starring: Enrico Maria Salerno
- Cinematography: Riccardo Pallottini
- Edited by: Roberto Perpignani
- Music by: Stelvio Cipriani
- Release date: 1973
- Country: Italy
- Language: Italian

The Great Kidnapping (Italian: La polizia sta a guardare, also known as The Police Look On and Ransom! Police Is Watching) is a 1973 Italian poliziottesco film directed by Roberto Infascelli.

== Cast ==
- Enrico Maria Salerno: Quaestor Cardone
- Lee J. Cobb: Ex Quaestor Iovine
- Jean Sorel: Attorney
- Luciana Paluzzi: Renata Boletti
- Gianni Bonagura: Zenoni
- Laura Belli: Laura Ponti
- Tino Bianchi: coroner
- Claudio Gora: lawyer
- Ennio Balbo: Prefect
