= Silvano Tranquilli =

Italian actor (1925–1997)

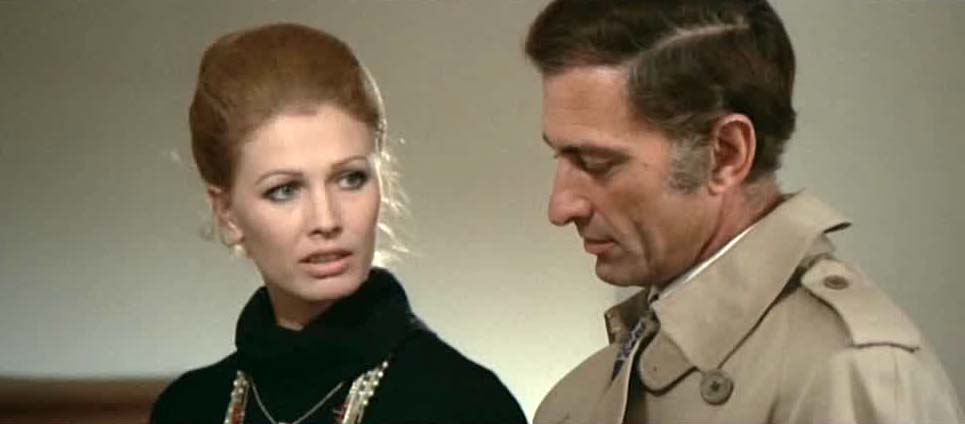
- Tranquilli (right) and Ida Galli (left) in The Bloodstained Butterfly (1971).
- Born: 23 August 1925; Rome, Italy
- Died: 10 May 1997 (aged 71); Rome, Italy
- Education: Accademia Sharoff
- Occupations: Actor, voice actor

Silvano Tranquilli (23 August 1925 – 10 May 1997) was an Italian actor and voice actor.

== Life and career ==
Tranquilli was born in Rome in 1925. He studied acting at the Accademia Sharoff, the first school in Italy to teach the Stanislavski Method. He started his stage activity with the theatrical companies of Salvo Randone and Vittorio Gassman.

In 1959 he made his television debut, and later acted in more than 100 television productions, achieving his main success with the TV-series I ragazzi di padre Tobia. In the early 1960s he also started a prolific film career as character actor. As an Italian-language dubber, he notably dubbed the voices of Jack Warden, Lee J. Cobb, Lance Henriksen, and Lang Jeffries.

In the 1990s, his he made his theatrical comeback with the company Stabile del Giallo.

== Death ==
Tranquilli died in Rome in 1997, aged 71.

== Selected filmography ==
- Adriana Lecouvreur (1955)
- Il conte Aquila (1955)
- Napoli sole mio! (1958) - Segretario del Impresario
- Perfide ma... belle (1959) - The Telephone Technician (uncredited)
- I piaceri del sabato notte (1960) - Il vice commissario
- The Horrible Dr. Hichcock (1962) - Dr. Kurt Lowe
- Castle of Blood (1964, aka Danse Macabre) - Edgar Allan Poe
- I due sanculotti (1966) - Robespierre
- Shoot Loud, Louder... I Don't Understand (1966) - Il tenente Bertolucci
- The Invisible Woman (1969) - Andrea
- Help Me, My Love (1969) - Valerio Mantovani
- Unknown Woman (1969) - L'ing. Zappengo
- Lonely Hearts (1970) - Diego
- Sunflower (1970) - L'operaio italiano
- Mafia Connection (1970) - Commissario Modica
- Quella chiara notte d'ottobre (1970)
- L'Explosion (1971) - Aubrey
- Black Belly of the Tarantula (1971) - Paolo Zani
- Web of the Spider (1971) - William Perkins
- The Double (1971) - Roger
- The Bloodstained Butterfly (1971) - Inspector Berardi
- Sei iellato, amico hai incontrato Sacramento (1972) - Doc O'Donnell
- Smile Before Death (1972, a.k.a. Smile of the Hyena) - Marco
- So Sweet, So Dead (1972) - Paolo Santangeli
- Il mio corpo con rabbia (1972)
- La gatta in calore (1972) - Antonio
- Mia moglie, un corpo per l'amore (1973) - Paolo
- Giorni d'amore sul filo di una lama (1973)
- Happy New Year (1973) - L'amant italien
- High Crime (1973) - Franco Griva
- The Violent Professionals (1973) - Gianni Viviani
- Tony Arzenta - Big Guns (1973) - Montani - the Interpol officer
- Ceremonia sangrienta (1973) - Médico
- Mean Frank and Crazy Tony (1973) - Sylvester
- Tecnica di un amore (1973) - Andrea
- Diario di un italiano (1973) - Alberto
- And Now My Love (1974)
- Madeleine... anatomia di un incubo (1974) - Dr. Shuman
- The Balloon Vendor (1974) - Dr. Novelli
- Das Blaue Palais (1974–1976, TV series) - Louis Palm
- Manhunt in the City (1975) - Paolo Giordani
- Down the Ancient Staircase (1975) - Professor Rospigliosi
- Violent Rome (1975) - Capo della Squadra mobile
- Syndicate Sadists (1975) - Dr. Marco Marsili
- So Young, So Lovely, So Vicious... (1975) - Doctor Batrucchi
- Lips of Lurid Blue (1975) - Davide Levi
- MitGift (1976)
- Violent Naples (1976) - Paolo Gervasi
- La bravata (1977)
- L'affaire Suisse (1978) - Zurlini
- Star Odyssey (1979, a.k.a. Seven Gold Men in Space)
- The Finzi Detective Agency (1979) - Augusto Moser
- The Pumaman (1980) - Ambassador Dobson
- Tranquille donne di campagna (1980)
- L'ultimo giorno (1985) - Carlo Salvi
- Don Bosco (1988)
- Odore di spigo (1990)
