= Five Women for the Killer =

- Directed by: Stelvio Massi
- Edited by: Mauro Bonanni
- Music by: Giorgio Gaslini
- Release date: 1974
- Running time: 95 minutes
- Country: Italy
- Language: Italian

Five Women for the Killer (Italian: 5 donne per l'assassino) is an Italian giallo film directed in 1974 by Stelvio Massi. Il Giorno wrote "the film has the merit of a quick direction that does not spare chills and twists".

== Cast ==
- Francis Matthews as Giorgio Pisani
- Pascale Rivault as Dr. Lidia Franzi
- Howard Ross as Commissioner
- Giorgio Albertazzi as Aldo Betti
- Katia Christine as Alba
- Gabriella Lepori as Sofia
- Ilona Staller as Tiffany
- Alessandro Quasimodo as Fabrizio
- Catherine Diamant as Oriana
