= Jeff Blynn =

American former actor and model

- Born: August 21, 1954; New York, New York, United States
- Occupation(s): Restaurant Consultant ex Actor and Model

Jeff Blynn is an American former actor and model.

Blynn started his modeling career in New York with the Ford Modeling Agency. He moved to Europe, where he had enormous success modeling first in Paris with the agency Paris Planning and then in Milan with the agency Ricardo Gay. In 1975 he moved to Rome where he received a contract as an exclusive fotoromanzi actor for the company "Lancio"; Fotoromanzi were a cultural phenomenon in Italy and throughout Latin America. The Actors and Actresses were revered as Pop Stars and more than half of the population of Italy bought and read them each month. He made his film debut the same year, in L'unica legge in cui credo, a crime film almost entirely starred by "Lancio" fotoromanzi actors.

Between 1975 and 1982, Blynn was a minor star in the poliziotteschi genre. He is credited, but not visible in Cliffhanger (film). He retired from acting at the beginning of the 1990s to devote himself to his restaurant in Rome in the Parioli area. The Restaurant bore his name "Jeff Blynn's" and was one of the most successful restaurants of the capital.

For the last ten years Blynn has been working as a renowned consultant in the food and beverage industry.
