= High Crime =

- Italian film poster
- Directed by: Enzo G. Castellari
- Screenplay by: Tito Carpi; Gianfranco Clerici; Vincenzo Mannino; Enzo G. Castellari; Leonardo Martín
- Story by: Leonardo Martín
- Produced by: Edmondo Amati
- Starring: Franco Nero; Fernando Rey; James Whitmore; Delia Boccardo; Duilio Del Prete; Silvano Tranquilli; Luigi Diberti
- Cinematography: Alejandro Ulloa
- Edited by: Vincenzo Tomassi
- Music by: Guido & Maurizio De Angelis
- Production companies: Fida Cinematografica; Capitolina Produzini Cinematografiche; Star Films; Suevia Films
- Distributed by: Fida Cinematografica
- Release date: 12 August 1973 (Italy)
- Running time: 105 minutes
- Countries: Italy; Spain
- Box office: ₤1.825 billion

High Crime (Italian: La polizia incrimina la legge assolve, Spanish: La policía detiene, la ley juzga) is a 1973 Italian-Spanish poliziottesco film directed by Enzo G. Castellari. The film stars Franco Nero, James Whitmore, Delia Boccardo and Fernando Rey. High Crime was a large financial success at the time of its release and helped popularize the Italian cop thriller genre.

== Plot ==
A Lebanese drug dealer arrives in Genoa and Vice-Commissioner Belli soon tracks him down. After a long car chase, Belli manages to arrest him. However, when the prisoner is being taken to the police station, the police car is bombed before it reaches its target. The Lebanese and four policemen die in the hit, but Belli survives. Belli then goes to Cafiero, an old-fashioned gangster who claims to have transformed into a peaceful gardener, to question about the bombing and it turns out that there is a new player in town. Cafiero decides to take care of the new gang before the police get to them. His task turns out to be more difficult when his trusted man, Rico, turns out to be a mole working for the unknown new gangsters.

Belli's boss, Commissioner Aldo Scavino, has put together a dossier on the city's mafia connections, but thinks that there is not enough hard evidence to take down all the gangsters from top to down. After several discussions with Belli, he finally agrees to take the dossier to the district attorney. However, he is murdered and the dossier is stolen. Belli now takes over Scavino's seat as the Commissioner and eventually finds the murderer. The murderer names Umberto Griva as his boss, as Belli expected. When Griva's brother Franco is found murdered, it seems that someone with even higher political connections is trying to take over the city's drug trafficking.

Belli then starts from square one and, after a warning from Cafiero, decides to send his daughter away to a safer place. However, his daughter is soon murdered and his girlfriend Mirella is beaten up. With a helpful hint from Cafiero, Belli finds out about a large drug smuggling operation. As Belli arrives on the scene, a shootout ensues, and Belli survives while all the criminals are killed.

== Cast ==
- Franco Nero as Vice-Commissioner Belli
- Fernando Rey as Cafiero
- James Whitmore as Commissioner Aldo Scavino
- Delia Boccardo as Mirella
- Duilio Del Prete as Umberto Griva
- Silvano Tranquilli as Franco Griva
- Ely Galleani as Chicca
- Daniel Martín as Rico
- Luigi Diberti as Coffi, Belli's Assistant
- Mario Erpichini as Rivalta
- Stefania G. Castellari as Anita Belli
- Bruno Corazzari as Assassin
- Joaquín Solis as Tony, Cafiero's Servant
- Edy Biagetti as Griva's Friend
- Massimo Vanni as Truck-Driving Thug
- Zoe Incrocci as Scavino's Wife
- Paolo Giusti as Chicca's Friend
- Victor Israel as Scorfano
- Carla Mancini as Girl watching TV

Uncredited:

- Enzo G. Castellari as Party Reporter
- Paul Costello as Griva's Lawyer
- Mickey Knox as Party Newsman
- Nello Pazzafini as Assassin
- Riccardo Petrazzi as Hitman
- Natasha Richardson as Luisa, the girl playing hopscotch
- Leonardo Scabino as Coroner

Credits adapted from Italian Crime Filmography, 1968-1980.

== Production ==
Director Enzo G. Castellari was influenced to create High Crime after watching the film Bullitt. When presenting the idea of this sort of film to producer Edmondo Amati, he was told to show him a story. Castellari discussed a plot with screenwriters Tito Carpi and Amati's son Maurizio. The group developed a treatment based around the murder of Luigi Calabresi. Castellari did not want Edmondo Amati to read their script, and decided to tell him the story instead. Italian film historian Roberto Curti has stated that despite Castellari's recollections, he felt the story outline was more derived from William Friedkin's The French Connection with its similarity to its opening scenes and Fernando Rey's presence as an elderly crime boss.

High Crime was filmed at Incir De Paolis in Rome and on location in Genoa, Ligurian coast, and in Marseille.

== Release ==
High Crime was released on 12 August 1973 in Italy, where it was distributed by Fida Cinematografica. The film grossed 1,825,825,000 Italian lire on its theatrical run in Italy. The film was described as a "huge box office hit" by historian Roberto Curti.

== Reception ==
In a contemporary review, the Monthly Film Bulletin gave the film a negative review, finding the film "especially graceless when one recalls the opaque joys of Salvatore Giuliano." The review critiqued the dubbing, and that its formulaic character scarcely redeemed by high-minded nods at social comment (militant workers, corrupt capitalists), the film fails even to vindicate an early promise of more homely pleasures: "You cops ... you're always full of jokes".

== Footnotes ==
=== References ===
- Curti, Roberto (2013). Italian Crime Filmography, 1968-1980. McFarland. ISBN 978-0786469765.
