= Convoy Busters =

- Directed by: Stelvio Massi
- Screenplay by: Gino Capone; Teodoro Corrà; Stelvio Massi
- Story by: Danilo Massi
- Starring: Maurizio Merli; Massimo Serato; Mimmo Palmara; Marco Gelardini
- Cinematography: Sergio Rubini
- Edited by: Mauro Bonanni
- Music by: Stelvio Cipriani
- Production company: P.A.C. - Produzioni Atlas Consorziate
- Distributed by: P.A.C.
- Release date: 23 December 1978 (Italy)
- Running time: 99 minutes
- Country: Italy
- Box office: ₤989.391 million

Convoy Busters (Italian: Un poliziotto scomodo) is a 1978 poliziotteschi film directed by Stelvio Massi and starring Maurizio Merli.

== Cast ==
- Maurizio Merli: Inspector Francesco Olmi
- Olga Karlatos: Anna
- Massimo Serato: Degan Sr.
- Mario Feliciani: Quaestor
- Mimmo Palmara: Corchi
- Marco Gelardini: Degan Jr.
- Attilio Duse: Brigadier Ballarin
- Nello Pazzafini:criminal

== Production ==
Convoy Busters was filmed on location in Rome and Civitanova Marche.

== Releases ==
Convoy Busters was distributed theatrically in Italy by P.A.C. - Produzioni Atlas Consorziate on 23 December 1978. It grossed a total of 989,390,960 Italian lira on its domestic release. Italian film historian and critic Roberto Curti stated that this gross was no par with Maurizio Merli's previous films noting that his star power was beginning to fade at this point.

The film released by NoShame on DVD in the United States.

== Reception ==
Curti stated that the film was "unusually well-received by critics", including Vittorio Spiga who praised the film as Massi's best work, referring to Massi as managing "to renew the genre somehow: by borrowing the style of the Italian Western, its violence and characters, while taking the spectacular angle and the fast pacing from American cinema." Tom Milne of the Monthly Film Bulletin stated that "Although Stelvio Massi places numbing reliance on the zoom lens, it is competently enough done, with a sound performance by Maurizio Merli in the Eastwood role." Milne also commented on the dubbing, declaring it "horribly dubbed and stultifyingly tedious."

In a retrospective review, Curti declared the film to be "perhaps Stelvio Massi's best effort, and one of the better late Italian poliziotteschi"
