= Don Bosco (1988 film) =

- Directed by: Leandro Castellani
- Written by: Ennio De Concini
- Starring: Ben Gazzara
- Cinematography: Renato Tafuri
- Music by: Stelvio Cipriani
- Production companies: Elle Di Ci Cinematografica; Tiber Cinematografica
- Distributed by: Columbia Tri-Star Films Italia
- Release date: 30 September 1988
- Languages: Italian; English

Don Bosco is a 1988 Italian biographical drama film directed by Leandro Castellani. It depicts real life events of Roman Catholic priest John Bosco.

== Cast ==
- Ben Gazzara as Don Giovanni Bosco
- Patsy Kensit as Lina
- Karl Zinny as Giuseppe
- Laurent Terzieff as Mons. Gastaldi
- Piera Degli Esposti as Lina's mother
- Philippe Leroy as Pope Leo XIII
- Raymond Pellegrin as Pope Pius IX
- Leopoldo Trieste as Don Borel
- Edmund Purdom as Urbano Rattazzi
- Rik Battaglia as Marchese Michele Cavour
- Silvano Tranquilli
