= Little Italy (1978 film) =

1978 comedy crime film

- Directed by: Bruno Corbucci
- Written by: Mario Amendola; Bruno Corbucci
- Produced by: Galliano Juso
- Starring: Tomas Milian
- Cinematography: Marcello Masciocchi
- Edited by: Daniele Alabiso
- Music by: Goblin
- Release date: 1978
- Running time: 91 minutes
- Country: Italy
- Language: Italian

Squadra antimafia, internationally released as Little Italy, is a 1978 Italian "poliziottesco"-comedy film directed by Bruno Corbucci. It is the fourth chapter in the Nico Giraldi film series starred by Tomas Milian.

== Cast ==
- Tomas Milian as Nico Giraldi
- Enzo Cannavale as Salvatore Esposito
- Eli Wallach as Don Girolamo Giarra
- Bombolo as Venticello
- Margherita Fumero as Maria Sole Giarra
- Massimo Vanni as Brigadiere Gargiulo
- John P. Dulaney as Ballarin
- Tomas Milian, Jr. as Francesco

== See also ==
- List of Italian films of 1978
