= Manhunt in the City =

- Directed by: Umberto Lenzi
- Screenplay by: Dardano Sacchetti; Umberto Lenzi
- Story by: Dardano Sacchetti; Umberto Lenzi
- Produced by: Enzo Peri
- Starring: Henry Silva; Luciana Paluzzi; Silvano Tranquilli; Claudio Gora
- Cinematography: Guglielmo Mancori
- Edited by: Eugenio Alabiso
- Music by: Bruno Nicolai
- Production company: Aquila Cinematografica
- Distributed by: Titanus
- Release date: 8 May 1975 (Italy)
- Running time: 100 minutes
- Country: Italy
- Language: Italian
- Box office: ₤711.5 million

As the investigation progresses, Vannucchi becomes increasingly isolated and is subtly encouraged by authority figures to take justice into his own hands. His obsession leads him down a path of vigilantism, blurring the line between victim and aggressor. The film ultimately reveals that his actions are manipulated for political ends, resulting in tragic consequences and the punishment of an innocent man.

Manhunt in the City (Italian: L'uomo della strada fa giustizia, lit. 'The Average Man Gets Justice'), also known as The Manhunt, is a 1975 Italian poliziottesco film directed by Umberto Lenzi. It was co-written by Dardano Sacchetti and has a score by Bruno Nicolai.

== Cast ==
- Henry Silva as David Vannucchi
- Raymond Pellegrin as Inspector Bertone
- Luciana Paluzzi as Vera Vannucchi
- Silvano Tranquilli as Giordani
- Claudio Gora as Lawyer Mieli
- Luciano Catenacci as Pascucci

== Production ==
Manhunt in the City was filmed at Elios Film in Rome and on location in Milan. Lenzi initially considered Claudio Cassinelli for the lead role before casting Henry Silva, whose restrained and detached performance aligned with the film’s themes. The director and Silva had collaborated previously, and Lenzi later cited the casting as central to the film’s unsettling tone. Lenzi originally envisioned Claudio Cassinelli in the role that Silva has. Henry Silva and Luciana Paluzzi are paired again, after their performance together in The Italian Connection (1972).

== Style ==
The film is part of vigilante subgenre. The films script overturns initial assumptions where the engineer Vannucchi get manipulated by a fascist lawyer who heads an army of vigilantes and ends up killing the wrong person. Lenzi stated that he desired to make a film in contrast to Enzo G. Castellari's Street Law. The film also has a few elements of the giallo genre, as Silva's hunt for a criminal who wears a bracelet depicting a scorpion.

Unlike many poliziottesco films of the period, Manhunt in the City adopts a pessimistic tone and avoids glorifying vigilantism. Director Umberto Lenzi later described the film as a deliberate critique of revenge-driven narratives, emphasizing moral ambiguity over cathartic violence. The film also incorporates elements of the giallo genre, particularly through its focus on paranoia and symbolic motifs.

== Release ==
Manhunt in the City was released in Italy on 8 May 1975 where it was distributed by Titanus. On its theatrical run in Italy, the film grossed 711.5 million Italian lira. Critical reception at the time of release was mixed, with some reviewers noting the film’s bleak outlook and lack of a conventional heroic resolution. In later years, the film has been re-evaluated by critics and scholars as one of Lenzi’s more thematically complex works within the poliziottesco genre. According to Lenzi, "censors found it very annoying that in the end the Commissioner, understanding the protagonist's motives that lead to his revenge, lets him go unpunished." The film was issued on DVD in Italy in 2010.

== See also ==
- List of Italian films of 1975

== Footnotes ==
=== References ===
- Curti, Roberto (2013). Italian Crime Filmography, 1968-1980. McFarland. ISBN 978-0786469765.
