= Stelvio Massi =

Italian film director (1929–2004)

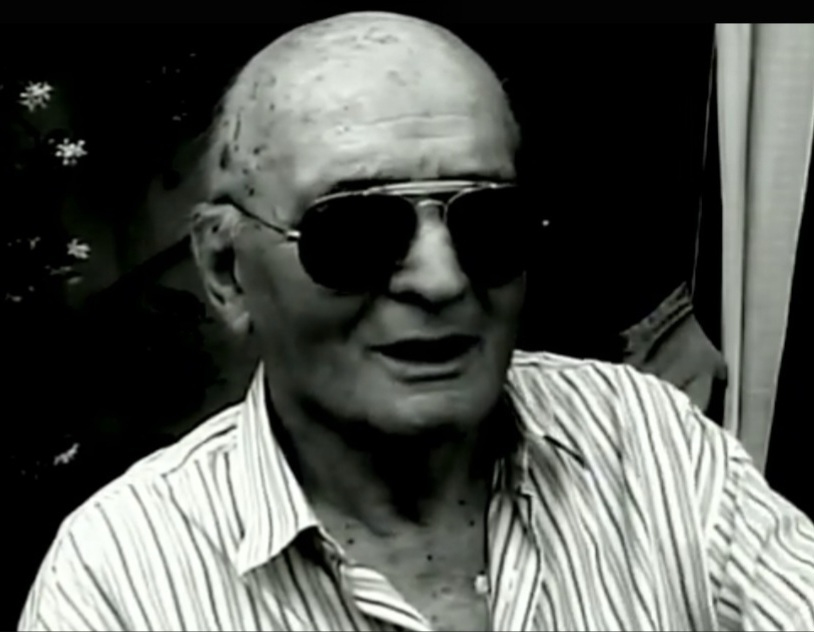
- Stelvio Massi in 2003
- Born: 26 March 1929; Civitanova Marche, Kingdom of Italy
- Died: 26 March 2004 (aged 75); Velletri, Italy
- Occupation: Filmmaker

Stelvio Massi (26 March 1929 – 26 March 2004), sometimes credited "Max Steel", was an Italian director, screenwriter, and cinematographer, best known for his "poliziotteschi" films.

== Career ==
Born in Civitanova Marche, the son of a tobacconist and a housewife, Massi studied at the Macerata Art Institute, and later at the Accademia di Belle Arti di Roma. He entered the cinema industry in 1952 as assistant camera operator, and in 1954, he became a cameraman. Ten years later, he began to work as cinematographer, and in 1973, he debuted as film director with Macrò. He obtained a great commercial success with the Mark il poliziotto film series, then with a series of poliziotteschi starred by Maurizio Merli.

Massi also worked on television, directing the 1987 TV series Due assi per un turbo. His son Danilo is also a film director.

== Filmography ==
Note: The films listed as N/A are not necessarily chronological.

Title	Year	Credited as				Notes	Ref(s)
Title	Year	Director	Screenwriter	Cinematographer	Other	Notes	Ref(s)
The Dragon's Blood	1957				Yes	Camera operator	
Duel of the Titans	1961				Yes	Camera operator	
A Fistful of Dollars	1964				Yes	Camera operator	
Genoveffa di Brabante	1964			Yes			
Per il gusto di uccidere	1966			Yes			
The Moment to Kill	1968			Yes			
The Price of Power	1969			Yes			
A Girl Called Jules	1970			Yes			
Sartana's Here… Trade Your Pistol for a Coffin	1970			Yes			
Have a Good Funeral, My Friend... Sartana Will Pay	1970			Yes			
Emergency Squad	1974	Yes	Yes				
Mark of the Cop	1975	Yes	Yes				
Mark Shoots First	1975	Yes	Yes				
Cross Shot	1976	Yes					
Mark Strikes Again	1976	Yes					
The Last Round	1976	Yes					
Destruction Force	1977	Yes	Yes				
Highway Racer	1977	Yes					
Fearless	1978	Yes	Yes				
Il commissario di ferro	1978	Yes					
Convoy Busters	1978	Yes	Yes				
Hunted City	1979	Yes	Yes				
The Rebel	1980	Yes	Yes				
Speed Driver	1980	Yes	Yes				
In ginocchio da te	—N/a			Yes			
Tears on Your Face	—N/a			Yes			
Non son degno di te	—N/a			Yes			
Se non avessi più te	—N/a			Yes			
Doc, Hands of Steel	—N/a			Yes			
Due oriundi per Cesare	—N/a			Yes			
Mi vedrai tornare	—N/a			Yes			
Nessuno mi può giudicare	—N/a			Yes			
Le due facce del dollaro	—N/a			Yes			
15 forche per un assassino	—N/a			Yes			
I ragazzi di Bandiera Gialla	—N/a			Yes			
Tiffany Memorandum	—N/a			Yes			
Your Turn to Die	—N/a			Yes			
Brutti di notte	—N/a			Yes			
The Fuller Report	—N/a			Yes			
I'll Sell My Skin Dearly	—N/a			Yes			
Alibi	—N/a			Yes			
The Archangel	—N/a			Yes			
Dio perdoni la mia pistola	—N/a			Yes			
Un posto all'inferno	—N/a			Yes			
They Call Him Cemetery	—N/a			Yes			
Il sergente Klems	—N/a			Yes			
They Call Me Hallelujah	—N/a			Yes			
Winged Devils	—N/a			Yes			
The Case of the Bloody Iris	—N/a			Yes			
Return of Halleluja	—N/a			Yes			
Il brigadiere Pasquale Zagaria ama la mamma e la polizia	—N/a			Yes			
Giovannona Long-Thigh	—N/a			Yes			
Ingrid sulla strada	—N/a			Yes			
Man Called Invincible	—N/a			Yes			
Giuda uccide il venerdì	—N/a	Yes					
Five Women for the Killer	—N/a	Yes					
Speed Cross	—N/a	Yes					
Guapparia	—N/a	Yes					
Torna	—N/a	Yes					
Mondo cane oggi - L'orrore continua	—N/a	Yes	Yes		Yes	Screen story writer	
The Black Cobra	—N/a	Yes					
Hell's Heroes - Eroi dell'inferno	—N/a	Yes					
Arabella: l'angelo nero	—N/a	Yes					
Droga sterco di Dio	—N/a	Yes					
The Cry of Truth	—N/a	Yes					
Alto rischio	—N/a	Yes	Yes				
La pista bulgara	—N/a	Yes					
Il quinto giorno (5°)	—N/a	Yes					
Tuono di proiettile	—N/a	Yes					
