= Hit Squad (film) =

1976 Italian crime comedy film

- Italian theatrical release poster
- Directed by: Bruno Corbucci
- Screenplay by: Mario Amendola; Bruno Corbucci
- Story by: Mario Amendola; Bruno Corbucci
- Produced by: Galliano Juso
- Starring: Tomas Milian; Robert Webber; Lilli Carati; Giuseppe Pambieri; Giuliana Calandra; Toni Ucci
- Cinematography: Marcello Masciocchi
- Edited by: Daniele Alabiso
- Music by: Guido & Maurizio De Angelis
- Production company: Cinemaster
- Distributed by: Titanus
- Release date: 29 October 1976 (Italy)
- Running time: 103 minutes
- Country: Italy
- Box office: ₤1.825 billion

Hit Squad (Italian: Squadra antifurto) is a 1976 Italian "poliziottesco"-comedy film directed by Bruno Corbucci. It is the second chapter in the Nico Giraldi film series starred by Tomas Milian.

== Plot ==
Marshal Nico Giraldi, a member of the anti-theft team, deals with criminals specializing in apartment and car thefts. Among these criminals are Blinds, a small-time thief prone to confessing, Zagaja, a stuttering thief, and Sicilian brothers Rosario and Salvatore Trapani. During a theft at an American villa (owned by a former CIA agent), the thieves acquire documents revealing a bribery system involving significant figures in the United States, known as Deal Zebra Point.

After contacting US emissary Ralf Douglas to demand money for the return of the documents, Blinds is killed. The murder of Zagaja alarms Marshal Giraldi, who suspects that Douglas had been robbed of something crucial. To uncover the truth, Giraldi tracks the Trapani brothers, who have been in contact with Douglas's emissaries. The attempt fails, and the brothers are killed. However, an emissary of Douglas leaves a clue that leads Giraldi to New York. There, he tracks down Douglas and has him arrested.

== Cast ==
- Tomas Milian: Nico Giraldi
- Robert Webber: Mr. Douglas
- Lilli Carati: Vanessa
- Giuseppe Pambieri: Tapparella
- Giuliana Calandra: Lt. Ciampini
- Toni Ucci: Filotto
- Olimpia Di Nardo: Olimpia Trippetta
- Massimo Vanni: Gargiulo
- John P. Dulaney: Ballarin
- Vittorio Stagni: Er Zagaja
- Enzo Pulcrano: Salvatore Trapanese
- Benito Stefanelli: Avv. Gorniani
- Bombolo: Er Trippa
- Mimmo Poli: Vittorio Raganelli (Il Musulmano)
- Giancarlo Badessi: Maniac
- Anna Bonaiuto: Cameriera
- Tony Morgan: Gnappetta
- Nello Pazzafini: Capitano della nave

== Release ==
Hit Squad was released on October 29, 1976 in Italy where it was distributed by Titanus. The film grossed a total of 1,825,316,810 Italian lire on its theatrical release.

== See also ==
- List of Italian films of 1976

== Notes ==
=== Bibliography ===
- Curti, Roberto (2013). Italian Crime Filmography, 1968-1980. McFarland. ISBN 978-0786469765.
