= Crime at the Chinese Restaurant =

1981 Italian crime comedy film

- Italian theatrical release poster by Renato Casaro
- Directed by: Bruno Corbucci
- Written by: Bruno Corbucci; Mario Amendola
- Starring: Tomas Milian
- Cinematography: Giovanni Ciarlo
- Edited by: Daniele Alabiso
- Music by: Detto Mariano
- Release date: 19 November 1981 (Italy)
- Running time: 95 minutes
- Country: Italy
- Language: Italian

Crime at the Chinese Restaurant (Italian: Delitto al ristorante cinese) is a 1981 Italian "poliziottesco"-comedy film directed by Bruno Corbucci. It is the eighth chapter in the Nico Giraldi film series; in this chapter Tomas Milian plays a double role, the inspector Nico Giraldi and the Chinese Ciu Ci Ciao, a character reprised, with slight changes, from the role of Sakura that the same Milian played in the 1975 spaghetti western The White, the Yellow, and the Black.

== Cast ==
- Tomas Milian as Nico Giraldi / Ciu Ci Ciao
- Bombolo as Bombolo
- Enzo Cannavale as Vincenzo Quagliarulo
- Olimpia Di Nardo as Angela
- John Chen as Chan Zeng Piao
- Giacomo Furia as Giudice Arducci
- Massimo Vanni as Brigadier Gargiulo
- Alfredo Rizzo as Il marito dell'amante di Papetti

== Release ==
The film was released in Italy on November 19, 1981.

== See also ==
- List of Italian films of 1981
