= Speed Cross =

- Directed by: Stelvio Massi
- Written by: Lucio De Caro; Steno
- Produced by: Giovanni Di Clemente
- Starring: Fabio Testi
- Music by: Toto Torquati
- Release date: 1980
- Language: Italian

Speed Cross is a 1980 Italian crime-action film directed by Stelvio Massi.

== Cast ==
- Fabio Testi: Paolo Corti
- Vittorio Mezzogiorno: Nicola Cellamare
- Daniela Poggi: Inge
- Jacques Herlin: Fischer
- José Luis de Vilallonga: Meyer
- Lia Tanzi: Resi
- Massimo Ghini

== See also ==
- List of Italian films of 1980
