= Fear in the City =

- DVD cover
- Directed by: Giuseppe Rosati
- Written by: Giuseppe Rosati; Giuseppe Pulieri
- Starring: Maurizio Merli; Silvia Dionisio; James Mason
- Edited by: Franco Fraticelli
- Music by: Giampaolo Chiti
- Release date: 14 September 1976
- Country: Italy
- Languages: Italian; English

Fear in the City (Italian: Paura in città), also known as Street War and Hot Stuff, is a 1976 Italian poliziottesco action film directed by Giuseppe Rosati.

== Cast ==
- Maurizio Merli as Commissioner Mario Murri
- James Mason as Quaestor
- Raymond Pellegrin as Lettieri
- Silvia Dionisio as Laura Masoni
- Cyril Cusack as Giacomo Masoni
- Fausto Tozzi as Maresciallo Esposito
- Franco Ressel as Lo Cascio

== See also ==
- List of Italian films of 1976
