= Emergency Squad (1974 film) =

- Directed by: Stelvio Massi
- Screenplay by: Dardano Sacchetti; Adriano Bolzoni; Franco Barberi; Stelvio Massi
- Story by: Dardano Sacchetti
- Starring: Tomas Milian; Gastone Moschin; Stefania Casini; Guido Leontini
- Cinematography: Sergio Rubini
- Edited by: Mauro Bonnani
- Music by: Stelvio Cipriani
- Production company: C.B.A. Produttori e Distributori Associati
- Distributed by: Jumbo Cinematografica
- Release date: 24 April 1974 (Italy)
- Running time: 90 minutes
- Country: Italy
- Box office: ₤985.981 million

Emergency Squad (Italian: Squadra volante) is a 1974 Italian poliziottesco film directed by Stelvio Massi.

== Cast ==
- Tomas Milian as Tomas Ravelli
- Mario Carotenuto as Lavagni
- Gastone Moschin as "The Marseilles"
- Ray Lovelock as Rino
- Stefania Casini as Marta Hayworth
- Ilaria Guerini as Fede
- Guido Leontini as Mario Berlotti aka "Cranio"
- Enzo Andronico as Alberto
- Giuseppe Castellano (actor) as Beppe

== Release ==
Emergency Squad was distributed theatrically in Italy on 24 April 1974 by Jumbo Cinematografica. The film grossed a total of 985,981,000 Italian lire. Film historian and critic Roberto Curti described Emergency Squad as a "surprising commercial hit" on its initial theatrical release.

Director Stelvio Massi recalled that on the film's premiere in Rome he was deeply embarrassed by the audience's reaction to a scene where bandits shoot a police car that explodes as the audience greeted the scene with rapturous applause.

== See also ==
- List of Italian films of 1974

== Footnotes ==
=== Sources ===
- Curti, Roberto (2013). Italian Crime Filmography, 1968-1980. McFarland. ISBN 978-0786469765.
