= Delitto a Porta Romana =

1980 Italian crime comedy film

- Directed by: Bruno Corbucci
- Written by: Mario Amendola; Bruno Corbucci
- Produced by: Giovanni Di Clemente
- Starring: Tomas Milian
- Edited by: Daniele Alabiso
- Music by: Franco Micalizzi
- Release date: 30 October 1980
- Running time: 92 minutes
- Language: Italian

Delitto a Porta Romana (Crime at Porta Romana) is a 1980 Italian "poliziottesco"-comedy film directed by Bruno Corbucci. It is the seventh chapter in the Nico Giraldi film series starred by Tomas Milian.

== Cast ==
- Tomas Milian: Nico Giraldi
- Bombolo: Franco Bertarelli a.k.a. "Venticello"
- Olimpia Di Nardo: Angela Giraldi
- Nerina Montagnani: Grandmother of Angela
- Elio Crovetto: Bartolo a.k.a. "il Monzese"
- Lino Patruno: Enrico Vitucci
- Massimo Vanni: Brigadier Gargiulo
- Aldo Ralli: Professor Baldi
- Marina Frajese: Antonella
- Franco Diogene: Busoni
- Marcello Martana: Trentini
- Andrea Aureli: Maresciallo
