= What Have They Done to Your Daughters? =

1974 film by Massimo Dallamano

- Theatrical release poster
- Italian: La polizia chiede aiuto
- Directed by: Massimo Dallamano
- Screenplay by: Ettore Sanzò; Massimo Dallamano
- Story by: Ettore Sanzò
- Produced by: Paolo Infascelli
- Starring: Giovanna Ralli; Claudio Cassinelli; Mario Adorf; Franco Fabrizi; Farley Granger; Marina Berti; Corrado Gaipa; Paolo Turco; Ferdinando Murolo
- Cinematography: Franco Delli Colli
- Edited by: Antonio Siciliano
- Music by: Stelvio Cipriani
- Production company: Primex Italiana
- Distributed by: P.A.C.
- Release date: 10 August 1974
- Running time: 91 minutes
- Country: Italy
- Language: Italian
- Box office: ₤1.344 billion

What Have They Done to Your Daughters? (Italian: La polizia chiede aiuto, lit. 'The Police Ask for Help') is a 1974 Italian giallo and poliziottesco film directed by Massimo Dallamano, and starring Giovanna Ralli, Claudio Cassinelli, Mario Adorf, and Franco Fabrizi.

In the film, the local police of an Italian town discover that the apparent suicide of a teenage girl is connected to a large-scale underage prostitution ring, while a motorcycle-riding serial killer is targeting detectives and possible witnesses in an effort to cover up the crime. What Have They Done to Your Daughters? was released in Italy by P.A.C. on 10 August 1974.

== Plot ==
Following an anonymous tip-off, the police break into an attic apartment in a town in the province of Brescia and discover the naked body of a schoolgirl hanging from the rafters in an apparent suicide. The autopsy report reveals that the victim, 15-year-old Silvia Polvesi, was approximately two months pregnant. While reviewing footage of a student demonstration, Assistant District Attorney Vittoria Stori and Inspector Valentini see Silvia walk into a different building around the time of her death, leading Vittoria to believe that Silvia was actually murdered and the killer moved her body to the attic apartment.

Valentini hands over the case to homicide Inspector Silvestri. During an inspection of the crime scene, a middle-aged man is arrested for taking photographs from a nearby building. The man, Bruno Paglia, had been taking photographs of Silvia having sex with a young man in the attic. Silvestri tracks down and questions the young man in the photographs, Marcello, who has an alibi. The police discover the apartment where Silvia was murdered. Inside, they find a tape recorder, and the bathroom walls are covered in blood, meaning that there is a second victim.

The police release Paglia due to lack of evidence. Silvia's mother, Mrs. Polvesi, tells Vittoria that after finding birth control pills in her daughter's coat pocket, she hired a private detective, Ruggero Talenti, but he later dropped the case. The police find Talenti's dismembered remains wrapped in plastic bags inside the trunk of his own car. Silvestri questions Talenti's secretary and mistress, Rosa, who is in hospital recovering from a car accident, but she is too upset by her lover's murder to answer Silvestri's questions.

That night, Rosa calls Silvestri and begs him to come over, saying she now wants to help. A cleaver-wielding killer wearing black leather and a motorcycle helmet sneaks into the hospital and threatens Rosa, demanding to know where she "hid the stuff", but Silvestri and his colleague Napoli arrive in time to save her. After chopping Napoli's hand off, the killer flees the hospital on a motorcycle. Silvestri jumps into a police car and chases the killer, who ultimately escapes through a train tunnel.

Back at the hospital, Rosa shows the police tape recordings hidden in a vent. The recordings reveal an underage prostitution ring run by older men. Vittoria plays one of the recordings to Mrs. Polvesi, who confirms that Silvia's voice can be heard. The police learn of a butcher who has recently purchased a motorcycle with tire tracks that match those of the killer's motorcycle. Sergeant Giardina obtains a photograph of the butcher from his father, who said that his son left home three months earlier.

One night, the killer attacks Vittoria in the parking garage of her apartment building, but she narrowly survives. The police search for a butcher named Roberto Meichiorri, and his photograph is shown on television. Valentini's teenage daughter Patrizia, whose voice was heard in one of the recordings, tells Silvestri that she learned about the prostitution ring from Giuliana, a classmate. Giuliana informs the police that Paglia recruited her into the prostitution ring. Meanwhile, the killer murders Paglia at his home. To lure the perpetrators, Silvestri lies to the press that Paglia survived the attack and has confessed everything to the police.

After the local newspaper publishes the false story of Paglia's confession, Silvia's psychiatrist, Professor Beltrame, is found dead in his bathtub from an apparent suicide. One of Beltrame's former patients, Laura, informs Vittoria that he used to drug her and sexually abuse her. The police find incriminating files in Beltrame's office containing the names of the men involved in the prostitution ring, including prominent political figures.

Two young girls telephone the police saying they spotted Roberto near a piazza. The police surround the area. When Roberto emerges from a building while riding his motorcycle, attempting to shoot his way out, the police gun him down. Later, Silvestri's superior discourages him from prosecuting the culprits behind the prostitution ring, as it would take months and the killer is already dead.

== Cast ==
- Giovanna Ralli as Deputy Attorney Vittoria Stori
- Claudio Cassinelli as Inspector Silvestri
- Mario Adorf as Inspector Valentini
- Franco Fabrizi as Bruno Paglia
- Farley Granger as Mr. Polvesi
- Marina Berti as Mrs. Polvesi
- Paolo Turco as Marcello Tosti
- Corrado Gaipa as prosecutor
- Micaela Pignatelli as Rosa
- Ferdinando Murolo as Sergeant Giardina
- Salvatore Puntillo as Napoli
- Renata Moar as Laura
- Eleonora Morana as Polvesi's housemaid
- Adriana Falco as Giuliana Bigi
- Sherry Buchanan (credited as Cheryl Lee Buchanan) as Silvia Polvesi
- Clara Zovianoff as Mrs. Talenti
- Roberta Paladini as Patrizia Valentini
- Leonardo Severini as Agent Russo
- Luigi Antonio Guerra as reporter
- Lorenzo Piani as reporter
- Steffen Zacharias as Professor Beltrame (uncredited)

== Production ==
The film was shot at Dear Studios in Rome.

== Style ==
What Have They Done to Your Daughters? is considered a hybrid of two genres: the giallo and the poliziottesco. The film was one among the many hybrid gialli made predominantly between 1974 and 1975 when the popularity of the giallo was waning at the Italian box office while the poliziottesco were beginning to gain box office dominance.

== Release ==
What Have They Done to Your Daughters? was released in Italy on 10 August 1974 by P.A.C. The film grossed a total of 1,344,301,000 Italian lira on its domestic release.

It was released on Blu-ray by Arrow Video on 14 August 2018 and restored from the original camera negative.

== Reception ==
In his book Italian Crime Filmography, 1968–1980, Roberto Curti described the film as the best of the giallo and poliziottesco hybrids, stating that "Dallamano's direction is well above average". Danny Shipka, author of a book on European exploitation films, found the film "doesn't hold as much of a grip as" What Have You Done to Solange? as it focused too much on police protocol, but was still "an intense gritty film that deserves to be seen."
