= Maurizio Merli =

Italian film actor

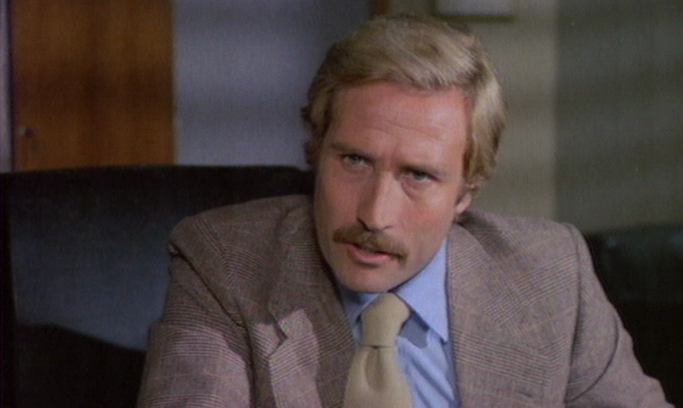
- Merli in Violent Rome (1975)
- Born: February 8, 1940; Rome, Italy
- Died: March 10, 1989 (aged 49); Rome, Italy
- Occupation: Actor
- Years active: 1963–1989

Maurizio Merli (February 8, 1940 – March 10, 1989) was an Italian film actor and a star of Italian police thrillers and Spaghetti Westerns such as Mannaja.

== Career ==
After a decade of minor film roles, 1974 saw a breakthrough for Merli with his first starring role in a remake of romantic drama Catene, and brought in as lead in the third of a franchise for White Fang to the Rescue, in part due to his resemblance to Franco Nero. However the following year became a true banner one for Merli when he made Violent Rome which was an enormous success, and made him the star of poliziotteschi genre. He went on to make 11 more, two as Commissario Betti, Merli's character in Violent Rome. Betti is a detective who metes out apoplectic violence, and in some way the character was an exploitative imitation of American police thrillers like Dirty Harry and a film of Nero. However, distinctive elements in Violent Rome reflected Italian law enforcement of the era. Similar to Luigi Calabresi, a real life policeman who though morally upright became notorious after being denounced in media for brutality and was assassinated, the character of Betti finds himself a marked man. At the ending of Violent Rome, Betti's now paralyzed in a wheelchair colleague cannot escape the conviction that Betti is fated to have a short future.

Merli appeared in a few international productions and even a comedy, but remained identified with Betti the toughest hero of poliziotteschi. The genre's decline as he moved into middle age meant that his last roles were in lesser productions.

The athletic looking Merli enjoyed participating in sport and was unaware of having any heart trouble, but he died suddenly in 1989 of myocardial infarction after a tennis match.

== Partial filmography ==
- The Leopard (1963) – (uncredited)
- Due rrringos nel Texas (1967) – Union Soldier (uncredited)
- Phenomenal and the Treasure of Tutankhamen (1968) – Pino
- Eros e Thanatos (1969) – Giornalista Barni
- Decameron proibitissimo (Boccaccio mio statte zitto) (1972) – Cecco – friend of Rinaldo
- Le mille e una notte all'italiana (1972)
- Catene (1974) – Alfio Capuano
- White Fang to the Rescue (1974) – Burt Halloway
- Violent Rome (1975) – Commissario Betti
- The Tough Ones (1976) – Inspector Leonardo Tanzi
- Violent Naples (1976) – Commissioner Betti
- Fear in the City (1976) – Commissioner Mario Murri
- A Special Cop in Action (1976) – Betti
- The Cynic, the Rat and the Fist (1977) – Leonardo Tanzi
- Mannaja (1977) – Mannaja
- Highway Racer (1977) – Marco Palma
- A Man Called Blade (1977) – Blade
- Seagulls Fly Low (1978) – Albert Morgan
- Fearless (1978) – Walter 'Wally' Spada
- Covert Action (1978) – John Florio
- Fear in the City (1978) – Murri
- Convoy Busters (1978) – Olmi
- The Iron Commissioner (1978) – Commissioner Mauro Mariani
- From Corleone to Brooklyn (1979) – Lt. Giorgio Berni
- Hunted City (1979) – Commissioner Paolo Ferro
- The Rebel (1980) – Nick Rossi
- Vultures over the City (1981) – Mark Spencieri
- Priest of Love (1981) – Angelo Ravagli
- Spy Connection (1983) – Peter Wayne
- Tango blu (1987) – Walter Mantegazza
