= Swindle (1977 film) =

1977 Italian crime film

- Italian theatrical release poster
- Directed by: Bruno Corbucci
- Written by: Mario Amendola; Bruno Corbucci
- Starring: Tomas Milian
- Edited by: Daniele Alabiso
- Music by: Guido & Maurizio De Angelis
- Release date: 1977
- Running time: 96 min
- Country: Italy
- Language: Italian

Swindle (Italian: Squadra antitruffa, lit. 'Anti-Fraud Squad') is a 1977 Italian crime film co-written and directed by Bruno Corbucci and starring Tomas Milian and David Hemmings. It is the third chapter in the Nico Giraldi film series starred by Tomas Milian.

== Plot ==
A rude Roman policeman (Nico Giraldi) and an English detective team up in search of a gang that has carried out an enormous fraud against the Lloyd's of London. The culprits eliminate all possible witnesses but, despite everything, the couple still manages to climb to the head and sent him to jail.

== Cast ==
- Tomas Milian as Nico Giraldi
- David Hemmings as Robert Clayton
- Anna Cardini as The Girl
- Alberto Farnese as Avv. Ferrante
- Massimo Vanni as Brigadiere Gargiulo
- Leo Gullotta as Tarcisio "Er Fibbia" Pollaroli
- Bombolo as Franco Bertarelli aka Venticello
- Antonio De Leo as Milord
- John P. Dulaney as Ballarin
- Marcello Martana as Marshal Trentini
- Roberto Alessandri as Aldo Proietti aka Er Picchio
- Marcello Verziera as The False Killer
- Nazzareno Natale as Taxi driver
- Giancarlo Badessi as Baruffaldi, the Atalanta supporter
- Roberto Messina as Commissioner Tozzi
- Marco Tulli as Venticello's Accomplice
- Andrea Aureli as Angelo Tornabuoni
