= Crime in Formula One =

1984 Italian crime comedy film

- Italian theatrical release poster by Renato Casaro
- Directed by: Bruno Corbucci
- Written by: Mario Amendola; Bruno Corbucci
- Produced by: Mario Cecchi Gori; Vittorio Cecchi Gori
- Starring: Tomas Milian
- Edited by: Daniele Alabiso
- Music by: Fabio Frizzi
- Release date: 17 February 1984
- Running time: 95 minutes
- Country: Italy
- Language: Italian

Crime in Formula One (Italian: Delitto in Formula Uno) is a 1984 Italian "poliziottesco"-comedy film written and directed by Bruno Corbucci. It is the tenth chapter in the Nico Giraldi film series starred by Tomas Milian.

== Plot ==
At the Italian Grand Prix at Monza a great champion becomes the victim of a mysterious accident. An unusual cop arrives from Rome to help with the case.

== Cast ==
- Tomas Milian as inspector Nico Giraldi
- Bombolo as Venticello
- Pino Colizzi as Martelli
- Dagmar Lassander as Miss Martelli
- Olimpia Di Nardo as Angela Giraldi
- Sergio Di Pinto as Fabrizio
- Licinia Lentini as Rossana
- Isabel Russinova as RDS DJ
- Maria Grazia Buccella as Gambling-room attendant
- Enzo Garinei as Judge La Bella
- Marcello Martana as Trentini
- Massimo Vanni as Gargiulo
- Aldo Ralli as Daniele Bertoni
- Ennio Antonelli as Osvaldo Bonanni

== See also ==
- List of Italian films of 1984
