= Assassinio sul Tevere =

1979 Italian crime comedy film

- Directed by: Bruno Corbucci
- Starring: Tomas Milian
- Edited by: Daniele Alabiso
- Music by: Carlo Rustichelli
- Release date: 1979
- Language: Italian

Assassinio sul Tevere (Assassination on the Tiber) is a 1979 Italian "poliziottesco"-comedy film directed by Bruno Corbucci. It is the sixth chapter in the Nico Giraldi film series starred by Tomas Milian.

== Cast ==
- Tomas Milian: Nico Giraldi
- Marina Ripa Di Meana (credited as Marina Lante della Rovere): Eleonora Ruffini
- Angelo Pellegrino: Prosecutor Luciano Canuti
- Roberta Manfredi: Angela Santi
- Bombolo: Venticello
- Marino Masé: Nardelli
- Enzo Liberti: Otello Santi
- Massimo Vanni: Gargiulo
- Renato Mori: Galbiati
- Marcello Martana: Trentini
