= Catene (1974 film) =

1974 Italian film directed by Silvio Amadio

- Directed by: Silvio Amadio
- Starring: Maurizio Merli
- Cinematography: Antonio Maccoppi
- Music by: Roberto Pregadio
- Release date: 1974
- Country: Italy
- Language: Italian

Catene is a 1974 Italian melodrama film directed by Silvio Amadio. The film is the remake of the 1949 top grossing film with the same title by Raffaello Matarazzo. It was a commercial failure, grossing about 60 million lire.

== Cast ==
- Maurizio Merli as Alfio Capuano
- Rosemary Dexter as Francesca
- Mimmo Palmara as Giovanni
- Marco Liofredi as Ricuccio
- José Greci
- Tuccio Musumeci
