= Laura Belli =

Italian actress and singer (born 1947)

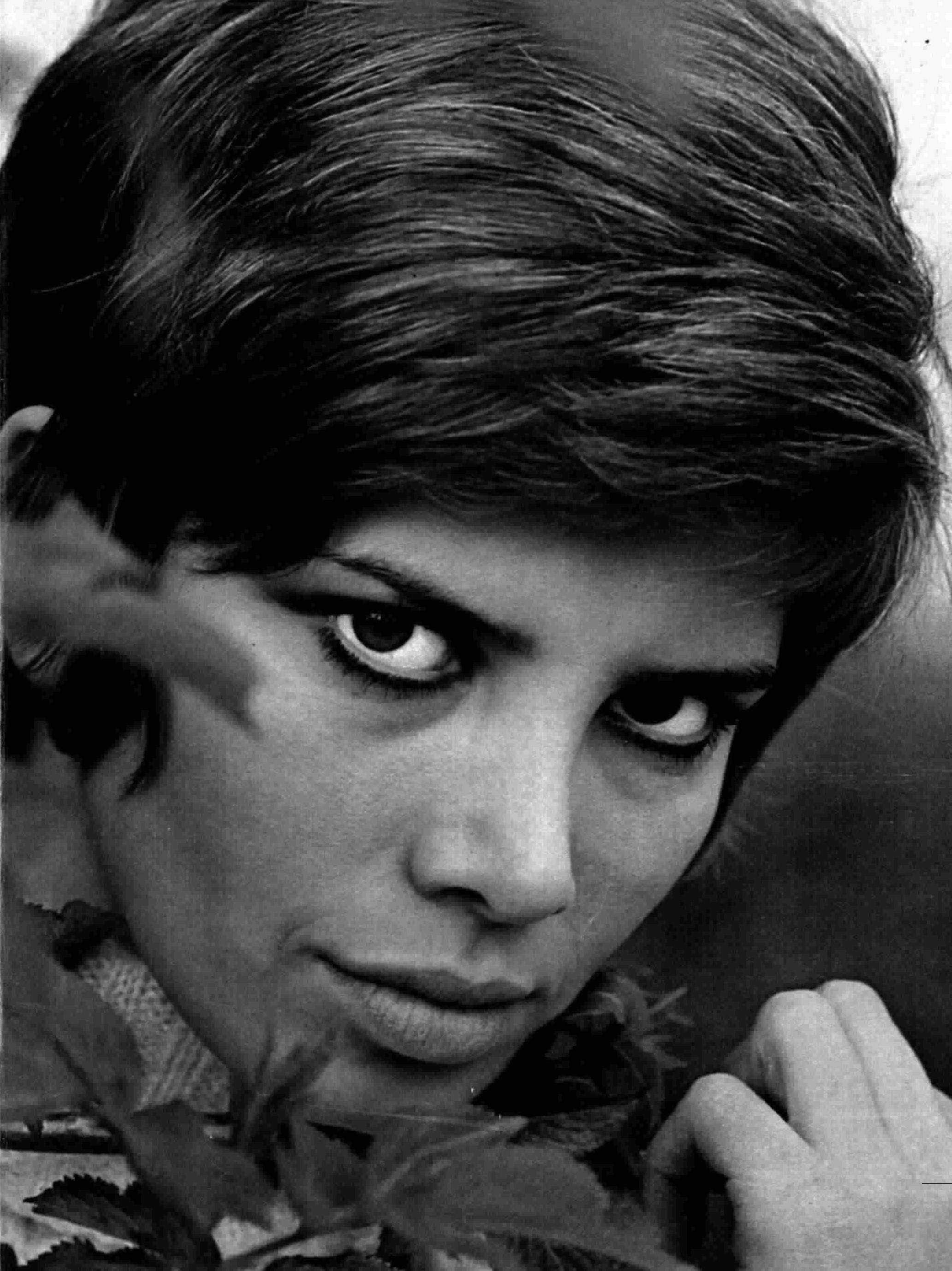

Laura Belli (born 11 November 1947) is an Italian actress and singer.

Born in Naples, Belli studied acting at the Centro Sperimentale di Cinematografia. She made her film debut in 1969, in Eriprando Visconti's The Lady of Monza, but is mainly known thanks to television, as the presenter of the RAI talk show Prossimamente and as an actress in several successful 1970s TV-series. She made her directorial debut in 1999 with Film.

== Filmography ==
- The Lady of Monza, Eriprando Visconti (1969)
- Faccia da schiaffi, Armando Crispino (1969)
- La stagione dei sensi, Massimo Franciosa (1969)
- La battaglia nel deserto, Mino Loy (1969)
- Il segno del comando, Daniele D'Anza (1971)
- Execution Squad, Stefano Vanzina (1972)
- La polizia sta a guardare, Roberto Infascelli (1973)
- Lungo il fiume e sull'acqua, Alberto Negrin (1973, TV miniseries)
- Il figlioccio del padrino, Mariano Laurenti (1973)
- Il vicino di casa, Luigi Cozzi (1973)
- Ho incontrato un'ombra, Daniele D'Anza (1974)
- Almost Human, Umberto Lenzi (1974)
- I giorni della Chimera, Franco Corona (1974)
- Gamma, Salvatore Nocita (1975)
- Porci con la P 38, Gianfranco Pagani (1978)
- From Corleone to Brooklyn, Umberto Lenzi (1979)
- L'enigma delle due sorelle, (1979)
- Ombre (1980)
