= The Big Racket =

1976 film

- Italian film poster
- Directed by: Enzo G. Castellari
- Screenplay by: Arduino Maiuri; Massimo De Rita; Enzo G. Castellari
- Story by: Arduino Maiuri; Massimo De Rita
- Produced by: Galliano Juso
- Starring: Fabio Testi; Vincent Gardenia; Renzo Palmer; Orso Maria Guerrini; Glauco Onorato; Marcella Michelangeli
- Cinematography: Marcello Masciocchi
- Edited by: Gianfranco Amicucci
- Music by: Guido & Maurizio De Angelis
- Production company: Cinemaster
- Distributed by: Titanus
- Release date: August 4, 1976 (Italy)
- Running time: 101 minutes
- Country: Italy
- Box office: ₤1.479 billion

The Big Racket (Italian: Il grande racket) is a 1976 Italian poliziottesco film directed by Enzo G. Castellari. Fabio Testi stars as a police inspector who takes on a gang of hoodlums who terrorise an Italian city by extorting cash from local shop and bar owners.

== Cast ==
- Fabio Testi: Inspector Nico Palmieri
- Vincent Gardenia: Pepe
- Renzo Palmer: Luigi Giulti
- Orso Maria Guerrini: Gianni Rossetti
- Glauco Onorato: Piero Mazzarelli
- Marcella Michelangeli: Marcy
- Romano Puppo: Doringo
- Antonio Marsina: Attorney Giovanni Giuni
- Salvatore Borghese: Sgt. Salvatore Velasci
- Joshua Sinclair: Rudy
- Daniele Dublino: Commissioner
- Anna Zinnemann: Anna Rossetti

== Production ==
The role of Doringo, played by Romano Puppo was a role Castellari initially wanted for Lou Castel. The Big Racket was shot at Incir-de Paolis in Rome and on location in Rome.

The character of the restaurateur's daughter is played by Stefania Castellari, the director's own daughter.

== Release ==
The Big Racket was released in Italy on August 4, 1976 where it was distributed by Titanus. The film grossed a total of 1,479,567,800 Italian lire.

The film was released by Blue Underground on DVD.

== Reception ==
The film received mixed reviews. Film critic Morando Morandini started his review writing ""It's a fascist film. It's a vile film. It's an idiot film" and subsequently criticized the violent and "reactionary" morality of the film.

In his book Italian Crime Filmography, Roberto Curti referred to the film as Castellari's best work and praised the action scenes in the film stating that they "outdo anything that had been done in Italy until then" and that "Castellari pulls out all the stops." Castellari stated that when the film was shown at retrospectives, someone always asks him how he shot the scene where Fabio Testi is trapped in a car while vehicle is tumbling down a ditch. Castellari also considers the ending of the film as the best one he has ever shot. AllMovie noted that the films "clever script" that builds "up in tension and brutality until it reaches its explosive finale." The review praised the acting of Fabio Testi, Vincent Gardenia and Renzo Palmer and praised the direction of Castellari stating that he "directs the film with his trademark kinetic sense of style, keeping up a sharp pace that blends action with quieter, more atmospheric, moments and deploying bursts of slow motion at just the right time during action scenes"

== See also ==
- List of Italian films of 1976
