= Violent Rome =

- Directed by: Marino Girolami
- Screenplay by: Vincenzo Mannino
- Story by: Vincenzo Mannino
- Starring: Maurizio Merli; Richard Conte; Silvano Tranquilli; Ray Lovelock; John Steiner; Daniela Giordano
- Cinematography: Fausto Zuccoli
- Edited by: Vincenzo Tomassi
- Music by: Guido & Maurizio De Angelis
- Production company: Flamina Produzioni Cinematografiche
- Distributed by: Fida
- Release date: 13 August 1975 (Itatly)
- Running time: 90 minutes
- Country: Italy
- Box office: ₤ 2,495 billion (Italy)

Violent Rome (Italian: Roma violenta) is an Italian 1975 poliziottesco film directed by Marino Girolami It obtained a great commercial success and launched the career of Maurizio Merli. The film is the first entry into the Commissioner Betti Trilogy.

== Cast ==
- Maurizio Merli as Commissioner Betti
- Richard Conte as Lawyer Sartori
- Silvano Tranquilli as capo della Squadra Mobile
- Ray Lovelock as Biondi
- John Steiner as Franco Spadoni aka 'Chiodo'
- Daniela Giordano as Lover of Betti
- Luciano Rossi as Delivery Man

== Production ==
After the financial success of High Crime, producer Edmondo Amati offered director Enzo G. Castellari to direct another film in the same vein. Castellari stated that he asked for more money but could not come to an agreement with the producer which led to Amati calling Castellari's father Marino Girolami to direct the film and cast Maurizio Merli. The film was shot at Incir – De Paolis in Rome.

== Release ==
Violent Rome was released on 13 August 1975 where it was distributed by Fida. The film grossed a total of 2,495,950,443 Italian lire domestically. In the United Kingdom the film was released as Street Killers.

== Notes ==
=== References ===
- Curti, Roberto (2013). Italian Crime Filmography, 1968-1980. McFarland. ISBN 978-0786469765.
