= Carroll Baker credits =

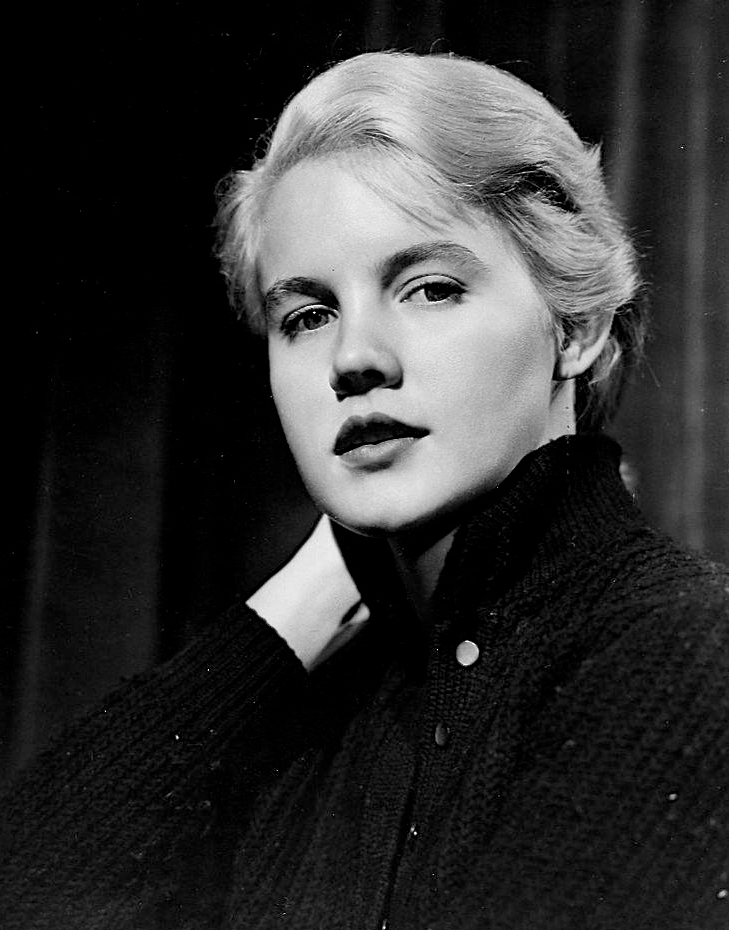
- Baker in a promotional photo, ca. 1956
- Film: 65
- Television series: 16
- Theatre: 15
- Others: 2 short films

Carroll Baker (born May 28, 1931) is an American actress of film, stage, and television. Spanning a career of fifty years, Baker appeared in 66 feature and television films, as well as 16 television appearances and over 15 stage credits, including 3 Broadway productions. Her most prolific role was in Elia Kazan's 1956 film Baby Doll, which earned her a Golden Globe and an Oscar nomination for Best Actress. Throughout her career, she became an established movie sex symbol.

Baker began her acting career in New York City as a member of the Actors Studio, and starred in Broadway productions before her screen debut in Easy to Love (1953). After the critical success of Baby Doll, Baker worked consistently throughout the 1960s, starring in westerns such as How the West Was Won (1962), as well as independent films such as Something Wild (1961) and melodramas The Carpetbaggers (1964) and Sylvia (1965). After portraying Jean Harlow in 1965's Harlow, Baker initiated a legal dispute over her contract with Paramount Pictures, which ultimately led to her being blacklisted in Hollywood. Baker moved to Europe in the late 1960s, where she starred in multiple Italian horror and giallo films.

She saw a return to American cinema in Andy Warhol's Bad in 1977, and later received critical acclaim for her performance in Ironweed (1987) alongside Jack Nicholson and Meryl Streep. Baker worked in both television and film into the 1990s, and had supporting roles in the critically acclaimed Hollywood films Kindergarten Cop (1990) and David Fincher's The Game (1997). She formally retired from acting in 2003.

== Screen ==
=== Films ===
Film
Year	Film	Role	Director(s)	Box office (USD)	Notes	Ref.
1953	Easy to Love	Clarice	Charles Walters	—N/a		
1956	Giant	Luz Benedict II	George Stevens	39,000,000		
1956	Baby Doll	Baby Doll Meighan	Elia Kazan	2,300,000	Won – Golden Globe for Most Promising Newcomer (female)* *shared with Jayne Mansfield and Natalie Wood; Nominated – Academy Award for Best Actress; Nominated – Golden Globe Award for Best Actress – Motion Picture Drama; Nominated – BAFTA for Best Foreign Actress	
1958	The Big Country	Patricia Terrill	William Wyler	4,000,000		
1959	But Not for Me	Ellie Brown/Borden	Walter Lang	2,500,000		
1959	The Miracle	Teresa	Irving Rapper	—N/a		
1961	Bridge to the Sun	Gwen Terasaki	Étienne Périer	—N/a		
1961	Something Wild	Mary Ann Robinson	Jack Garfein	—N/a		
1962	How the West Was Won	Eve Prescott	John Ford; Henry Hathaway; George Marshall	50,000,000		
1963	Station Six-Sahara	Catherine	Seth Holt	—N/a		
1964	The Carpetbaggers	Rina Marlowe Cord	Edward Dmytryk	13,000,000	Golden Laurel — Dramatic Performance, Female (2nd place)	
1964	Cheyenne Autumn	Deborah Wright	John Ford	3,500,000		
1965	Sylvia	Sylvia: West (Karoki, Kay, Carlyle)	Gordon Douglas	1,500,000		
1965	The Greatest Story Ever Told	Veronica	George Stevens	15,473,333		
1965	Mister Moses	Julie Anderson	Ronald Neame	1,250,000		
1965	Harlow	Jean Harlow	Gordon Douglas	3,400,000		
1967	Her Harem	Margherita	Marco Ferreri	—N/a		
1967	Jack of Diamonds	Herself	Don Taylor	—N/a		
1968	The Sweet Body of Deborah	Deborah	Romolo Guerrieri	1,600,000		
1969	Paranoia	Kathryn West	Umberto Lenzi	—N/a	Also known as: Orgasmo	
1969	So Sweet... So Perverse	Nicole Perrier	Umberto Lenzi	—N/a		
1970	A Quiet Place to Kill	Helen	Umberto Lenzi	—N/a	Also known as: Paranoia	
1971	The Fourth Victim	Julie Spencer/Lillian Martin	Eugenio Martín	—N/a	Also known as: Death at the Deep End of the Swimming Pool	
1971	Captain Apache	Maude	Alexander Singer	—N/a	Also known as: Deathwork	
1971	The Devil Has Seven Faces	Julie Harrison/Mary Harrison	Osvaldo Civirani	—N/a		
1972	Knife of Ice	Martha Caldwell	Umberto Lenzi	—N/a	Also known as: Silent Horror	
1973	Baba Yaga	Baba Yaga	Corrado Farina	—N/a	Also known as: Baba Yaga: Devil Witch, and Kiss Me, Kill Me	
1973	The Flower with the Deadly Sting	Evelyn	Gianfranco Piccioli	—N/a		
1974	The Body	Madeleine	Luigi Scattini	—N/a		
1975	Private Lessons	Laura Formenti	Vittorio De Sisti	—N/a		
1975	At Last, at Last	Lucia	Marino Girolami	—N/a		
1976	As of Tomorrow	Polly Pott	François Legrand	—N/a	Also known as: Blackmail Chase	
1976	My Father's Wife	Laura	Andrea Bianchi	—N/a	Also known as: Confessions of a Frustrated Housewife	
1976	Bait	Carol	Peter Patzak	—N/a	Also known as: Shattered Dreams	
1977	Andy Warhol's Bad	Hazel Aiken	Jed Johnson	1,500,000	Also known as: Bad	
1978	Cyclone	Sheila	René Cardona Jr.	—N/a	Also known as: Terror Storm	
1979	The World Is Full of Married Men	Linda Cooper	Robert Young	—N/a		
1979	The Sky is Falling	Treasure	Silvio Narizzano	—N/a	Also known as: Bloodbath	
1980	The Watcher in the Woods	Helen Curtis	John Hough	5,000,000		
1983	Star 80	Nelly Hoogstraten	Bob Fosse	6,472,990		
1983	Red Monarch	Brown	Jack Gold	—N/a		
1984	The Secret Diary of Sigmund Freud	Mama Freud	Danford B. Greene	—N/a		
1986	Native Son	Mrs. Dalton	Jerrold Freedman	1,301,121		
1987	Ironweed	Annie Phelan	Héctor Babenco	7,393,346		
1990	Gipsy Angel	Phoebe	Al Festa	—N/a		
1990	Kindergarten Cop	Eleanor Crisp	Ivan Reitman	201,957,688		
1991	Blonde Fist	Lovelle Summers	Frank Clarke	—N/a		
1992	Jackpot	Madame	Mario Orfini	174,000,000	Also known as: Cyber Eden	
1995	In the Flesh	Elaine Mitchelson	Nikolai Müllerschön	—N/a		
1996	Just Your Luck	Momie	Gary Auerbach	—N/a		
1997	The Game	Ilsa	David Fincher	109,400,000		
1998	Nowhere to Go	Nana	John Caire	—N/a		

=== Television series ===
Television
Year	Series	Role	Notes	Ref.
1952	Monodrama Theater	Clarice	Late-night show on DuMont Television Network	
1954	The Web		Episode: "The Treadmill"	
1955	Studio One	Jennie	Episode: "A Stranger May Die"	
	Danger		Episode: "Season for Murder"	
1963	Armchair Theatre	Lena Roland	Episode: "The Paradise Suite"	
1970	W. Somerset Maugham	Sadie Thompson	Episode: "Rain"	
1975	The Wide World of Mystery	Sandy Marshall	Episode: "The Next Victim"; was produced for Series 6 of Thriller	
1984	Sharing Time	Fran	Episode: "Oceans Apart"	
1985	Hitler's SS: Portrait in Evil	Gerda Hoffman	TV movie	
1985	What Mad Pursuit?	Louise Steinhauser	TV movie	
1987	On Fire	Maureen	TV movie	
1990	Grand	Viva	Episodes: "The Well", "Wolf Boy", "The Mother Load"	
1991	Tales from the Crypt	Mother Paloma	Episode: "The Trap"	
1991	P.S. I Luv U	Victoria	Episode: "The Honeymooners"	
1992	Davis Rules		Episode: "Everybody Comes to Nick's"	
1993	Murder, She Wrote	Sibella Stone	Episode: "Love's Deadly Desire"	
1993	L.A. Law	Rae Morrison	Episodes: "How Much Is That Bentley in the Window", "Leap of Faith", "Book of Renovation, Chapter 1"	
1993	Judgment Day: The John List Story	Alma List	TV movie	
1993	Men Don't Tell	Ruth	TV movie	
1993	A Kiss to Die For	Mrs. Graham	TV movie	
1995	Chicago Hope	Sylvie Tannen	Episode: "Informed Consent"	
1996	Dalva	Naomi	TV movie	
1996	Witness Run	Martha Shepherd	TV movie	
1997	North Shore Fish	Arlyne	TV movie	
1997	Skeletons	Nancy Norton	TV movie	
1997	Heart Full of Rain	Edith Pearl Dockett	TV movie	
1998	Rag and Bone	Sister Marie, Tony's Aunt	TV movie	
1999	Roswell	Grandma Claudia	Episode: "Leaving Normal"	
2000	Another Woman's Husband	Laurel's Mom	TV movie	
2003	The Lyon's Den	Jack's Mother	Episode: "The Quantum Theory"	

=== Short subjects ===
Short films
Year	Title	Role	Director	Notes
1965	Flashes Festival	Herself	Charles Gérard	Documentary
1970	The Spider			

=== Documentaries ===
Documentary subjects
Year	Title	Role	Notes
1975	James Dean: The First American Teenager	Herself	TV documentary
1987	Sex Symbols; Past, Present and Future	Herself	TV documentary
1987	Hollywood Uncensored	Herself	
1997	Big Guns Talk: The Story of the Western	Herself	TV documentary
2002	Cinerama Adventure	Herself	
2003	Time Machine: When Cowboys Were King	Herself	TV documentary
2009	Western Legenden – Made in Hollywood	Herself	TV documentary

== Stage credits ==
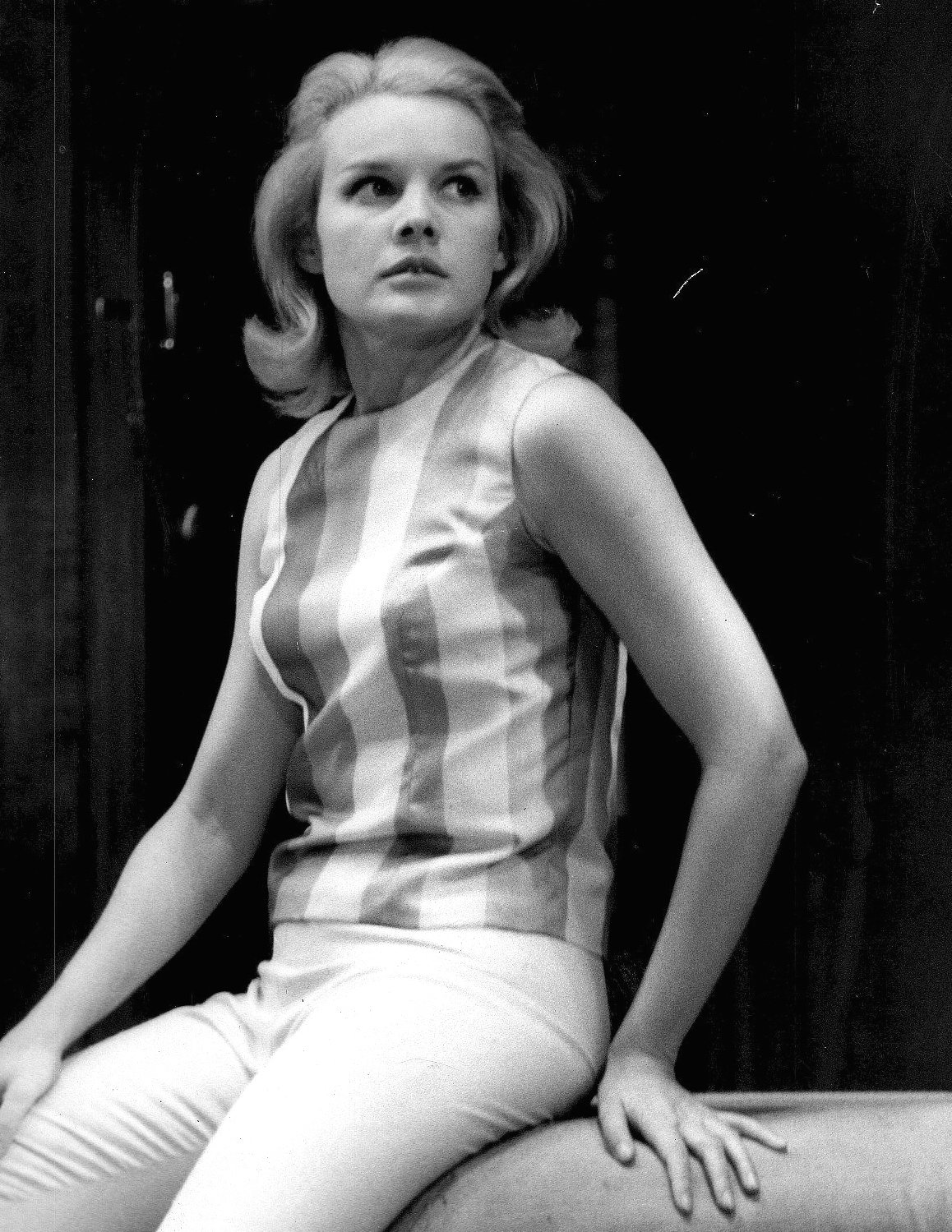
Baker in the Broadway production of Come on Strong, September 26, 1962

Stage performances
Year	Title	Role	Location	Notes
1953	Escapade	Molly	48th Street Theatre, New York City	Broadway production; 13 performances
1953	A Hatful of Rain		Actors Studio Workshop, New York City	
1954	All Summer Long	Ruth	Booth Theatre, New York City; Coronet Theatre, Los Angeles	Broadway; 60 performances
1958	Arms and the Man		Chicago	
1962	Come on Strong	Virginia Karger	Morosco Theatre, New York City	Broadway; 36 performances
1966	Anna Christie	Anna Christopherson	Los Angeles	
1967	Gentlemen Prefer Blondes		Los Angeles	
1977	Rain	Sadie Thompson	London, England	
1978	Bell, Book and Candle		Atlanta, Georgia	
1978	13 Rue de l'Amour		Jacksonville, Florida	
1979	Forty Carats	Ann Stanley		
1979	Lucy Crown	Lucy	London, England	
1979	Goodbye Charlie	Virginia Mason	Chicago, Illinois	
1980	Motive		London, England	
1981	Little Hut		Canada	
