= Guglielmo Mancori =

Italian camera operator and cinematographer (1927–1995)

- Born: 5 November 1927
- Died: 13 February 1995 (aged 67)
- Occupations: Cinematographer, lighting director and camera operator
- Children: Alvaro Mancori; Sandro Mancori
- Relatives: David Mancori

Guglielmo Mancori (5 November 1927 – 13 February 1995) was an Italian cinematographer, lighting director and camera operator.

He worked in Manhattan Baby (1982), Carabinieri si nasce (1985), by Mariano Laurenti, and Web of the Spider (1971). He also worked in Adventurer of Tortuga (1965), Revenge of The Gladiators (1964), Revenge of the Mercenaries (1962), Nebraska il Pistolero (1966), Manhattan Baby (1982), So Sweet... So Perverse (1969), From Corleone to Brooklyn (1978), Spasmo (1974),

== Filmography ==
- The Orderly (1961)
- Il capitano di ferro (1962)
- Le massaggiatrici (1962)
- Colossus of the Arena (1962)
- Goliath and the Sins of Babylon (1963)
- Thor and the Amazon Women (1963)
- Tor: Mighty Warrior (1963)
- Uno strano tipo (1963)
- Kidnapped to Mystery Island (1964)
- Gunmen of the Rio Grande (1964)
- The Revenge of Spartacus (1964)
- Seven Slaves Against the World (1964)
- Le sedicenni (1965)
- L'avventuriero della Tortuga (1965)
- The Big Blackout (1966)
- Man from Nowhere (1966)
- Johnny Colt (1966)
- Savage Gringo (1966)
- Z7 Operation Rembrandt (1966)
- I criminali della metropoli (1967)
- Stasera mi butto (1967)
- Il lungo, il corto, il gatto (1967)
- Ballad of a Gunman (1967)
- A suon di lupara (1968)
- Run, Man, Run (1968)
- Either All or None (1968)
- All on the Red (1968)
- So Sweet... So Perverse (1969)
- Tarzan in the Golden Grotto (1969)
- Paranoia (1969)
- Love Me, Baby, Love Me! (1969)
- The Weekend Murders (1970)
- Sartana Kills Them All (1970)
- A Quiet Place to Kill (1970)
- First Surrender (1971)
- Web of the Spider (1971)
- Terrible Day of the Big Gundown (1971)
- His Name Was King (1971)
- The Fourth Victim (1971)
- Stanza 17-17 palazzo delle tasse, ufficio imposte (1971)
- Roman Scandals '73 (1972)
- Novelle galeotte d'amore (1972)
- The Crimes of the Black Cat (1972)
- Amuck! (1972)
- Hector the Mighty (1972)
- Italian Graffiti (1973)
- The Fighting Fist of Shanghai Joe (1973)
- They Still Call Me Amen (1973)
- Fuzzy the Hero (1973)
- Il trafficone (1974)
- Spasmo (1974)
- The Exorcist: Italian Style (1975)
- We Are No Angels (1975)
- A forza di sberle (1975)
- The Manhunt (1975)
- Povero Cristo (1975)
- 4 Billion in 4 Minutes (1976)
- Black Emanuelle 2 (1976)
- There's a Spy in My Bed (1976)
- As of Tomorrow (1976)
- Live Like a Cop, Die Like a Man (1976)
- Sister Emanuelle (1977)
- Yellow Emanuelle (1977)
- Scusi lei è normale? (1979)
- Ring of Darkness (1979)
- From Corleone to Brooklyn (1979)
- Manhattan Baby (1982)
- Pierino la peste alla riscossa (1982)
- The Throne of Fire (1983)
- Naked and Cruel (1984)
- The Final Executioner (1984)
- Wild Beasts (1984)
- Man Hunt (1985)
- Carabinieri si nasce (1985)
- Jungle Raiders (1985)
- The Secret of the Incas' Empire (1987)
- Alien Terminator (1988)
- Cheeeese (1988)
- Let's go crazy (1988)
- The Black Cobra 2 (1989)
- Leathernecks (1989)
- Gipsy Angel (1990)

== Bibliography ==
- Kinnard, Roy; Crnkovich, Tony (20 February 2017). Italian Sword and Sandal Films, 1908-1990. McFarland Publishing. p. 256. ISBN 9781476662916.
- Paul, Louis (8 June 2015). Italian Horror Film Directors. McFarland Publishing. p. 376. ISBN 9780786487493.
