= Il coltello di ghiaccio =

1972 film

Knife of Ice
- Film poster
- Directed by: Umberto Lenzi
- Screenplay by: Umberto Lenzi
- Story by: Umberto Lenzi; Antonio Troiso
- Starring: Carroll Baker; Evelyn Stewart; George Rigaud
- Cinematography: José F. Aguayo, Jr.
- Edited by: Enzo Alabis
- Music by: Marcello Giombini
- Production companies: Tritone Cinematografica; Mundial Films; Incir-De Paolis
- Release date: 24 August 1972
- Running time: 91 minutes
- Countries: Italy; Spain
- Languages: Italian; English

Il coltello di ghiaccio (lit. English: Knife of Ice) is a 1972 giallo film directed by Umberto Lenzi and starring Carroll Baker, Evelyn Stewart, and George Rigaud. Both Baker and Stewart featured in several other films helmed by Lenzi. The film follows a mute woman who finds herself in danger when a serial killer begins stalking the Spanish countryside. The title takes its name from a quote attributed to Edgar Allan Poe, in which he refers to fear as a "knife of ice which penetrates the senses down to the depth of conscience"; the quote, however, was a fabrication by the filmmakers.

The film marked the fourth and final collaboration between actress Baker and director Lenzi, after she had starred in three of his previous films: So Sweet... So Perverse, Orgasmo, and A Quiet Place to Kill.

Elements of the film's script and direction have been cited as being reminiscent of works by fellow Italian Lucio Fulci. AllMovie's Robert Firsching has noted that Il coltello di ghiaccio "should prove fascinating to genre devotees."

== Plot ==
A famous singer, Jenny Ascot, visits her artist cousin Martha Caldwell at her home in the town of Martinet, located in the Spanish Pyrenees. Martha has long been rendered mute after witnessing both her parents being killed in a train crash when she was a child, her father saving her life by throwing out of a window before the train's worst wreckage. She communicates by hand gestures and tapping on the telephone receiver. Martha deliberately meets Jenny at the station to confront her fears. They see a violent bullfighting event together, but Martha is too distressed to watch and leaves. While Jenny and Martha are travelling to Martha's home, they notice a strange man with pearly eyes who seems to be following them.

That night, following a dinner party at Martha's villa, Jenny hears noises in the house and finds a broken vase. When she investigates, she is stabbed to death by an unseen figure. The following morning, Martha finds Jenny's corpse under the car in the garage. The police believe the killing is connected to the death of a teenage girl found in a ditch before, assuming a homicidal sex maniac is at large. Martha sees the strange man stalking her at the cemetery during Jenny's funeral, and when fleeing, he drops his pendant of a goat, revealing him as a Satanist. His hideout is soon found to be an abandoned building littered with morphine, but he's nowhere to be found. Martha continuously flashes back to pieces of imagery in her mind which come from her trauma and seem to relate to the murders. She later sees a cat with their throat slashed and lying in their own blood, the same cat Christina, the adolescent daughter of a family friend, was given as a present. Martha finds some comfort and companionship in her, even accepting a Snoopy necklace from her and giving her in return a Donald Duck wind-up toy.

One morning, Martha's housekeeper Annie Britton goes to run errands in town, taking her bicycle. En route back to Martha's house along a wooded road, Annie finds a strange occult symbol rendered in red paint on a tree, the same symbol police found in the ruined building where they suspect the Satanist performed Black Masses. Annie never returns from her errand, and Martha alerts her Uncle Ralph. Late that night, Martha's friend and therapist, Dr. Laurent, visits the villa, and finds Martha in a worried state. Martha notices a spot of blood on his pants, which Dr. Laurent attributes to a patient he treated earlier. Moments later, police phone the house, and Dr. Laurent answers: They inform him that Annie's corpse has been discovered in the woods, her throat slashed. A search reveals nothing, except the goat symbol painted into the tree.

During a rainstorm, police catch the man, British hippie Woody Mason, breaking into a local doctor's office and stealing morphine, but are unable to stop him when he flees. Meanwhile, Martha cares for her Uncle Ralph, who is weakened by a heart ailment. Martha is assaulted in the home by an unseen figure when the power goes out, found with an electrical cord tied around her neck. But when police arrive to perform a wellness check shortly after, they find no one present. Police subsequently find Woody in a nearby cemetery and apprehend him, but he denies any involvement in Annie's murder, nor that of the teenage girl, whom he was dating. When questioned herself, Martha admits that she cannot positively identify Woody as her attacker. Uncle Ralph worries about Martha's mental state, having observed that she has been depressed. At Martha's villa, Christina goes missing while playing a sort of hide-and-seek with Martha involving a blindfold. She is shortly after discovered dead near the house, and it is determined she was strangled to death. Christina's murder prompts police to reopen their investigation, and Woody is ultimately acquitted of his charges when an autopsy proves that his girlfriend, the girl in a ditch, died of a heroin overdose. Uncle Ralph soon after succumbs to a heart attack and presumably dies, only to be revealed as alive later without Martha's knowledge.

Martha is left alone at the villa one night, and finds herself again presumably being stalked by an assailant. She flees to the nearby cemetery and finds a pistol to use inside a crypt, only to find her chauffeur Marcos was following her. She is confronted by police officers, Dr. Laurent, and Uncle Ralph. Laurent informs Martha he filled her gun with blanks, and that Martha has been committing the murders all along in a dissociated state: Martha killed Jenny out of jealousy of her singing voice, then subsequently killed Annie in the woods to divert suspicion from her. She then strangled Christina to death when the girl had discovered evidence linking Martha to the crimes: the Snoopy necklace was found in the woods, and Uncle Ralph read Christina's diaries that said she found it covered in blood without knowing how it related to the murders. As Martha is escorted away, she regains her speech for the first time since childhood, and begins reciting the Lewis Carroll poem "The Mouse's Tale", which she once performed for her schoolmates as a child and listened to in tapes throughout the film.

== Cast ==
- Carroll Baker as Martha Caldwell
- Alan Scott as Dr. Laurent
- Evelyn Stewart as Jenny Ascot
- Eduardo Fajardo as Marcos
- Silvia Monelli as Mrs. Annie Britton
- George Rigaud as Uncle Ralph
- Franco Fantasia as Inspector Duran
- Mario Pardo as Woody Mason
- Olga Gherardi as Rosalie
- Rosa Rodriguez as Christina
- José Marco as Father Martin

== Production ==
=== Development ===
Baker and director Umberto Lenzi had already collaborated in several films, including 1969's Così dolce... così perversa and Orgasmo, and 1970's Paranoia. After being approached by producers to direct a fourth feature starring Baker, Lenzi sought to write a screenplay featuring a notably different narrative, as the three previous films had largely centered around themes of greed and sexuality.

Lenzi initially considered directing Baker in a remake of the 1946 American horror film The Spiral Staircase—which also follows a mute woman stalked by a killer in a rural country house—but instead chose to write an original screenplay utilizing a similar plot device, but subverting it with a twist ending in which the villain is revealed to be the main character all along. Thematically, Lenzi stated: "It was a movie in which I attempted to blend all the elements of psychological distortion of my previous films with a little bit of horror." The character of Woody Mason, a deranged hippie Satanist who serves as a red herring in the plot, was loosely based on Charles Manson. Lenzi co-wrote the screenplay for Il coltello di ghiaccio with Antonio Troiso, a young screenwriter who died of cancer at age 30, shortly before the shooting of the film began.

The film's use of Satanists as initial suspects has been compared to Lucio Fulci's film Don't Torture a Duckling, also released in 1972. Il coltello di ghiaccio features frequent use of close-up shots of characters' eyes, which has also been noted as a "Fulci trademark".

=== Casting ===
With Baker secured for the lead role of Martha Caldwell, Lenzi cast fellow American actor Alan Scott—who had worked primarily in bit parts in European films—as Dr. Laurent. Lenzi later commented that Scott was "clueless" about acting, and that he struggled directing him, adding: "I had to [instead] focus on Carroll, who knew how to act, and she was great at it." Established Spanish actor Eduardo Fajardo was cast as Martha's chauffeur, Marcos. Franco Fantasia, who portrays an investigator in the film, also served as an assistant director to Lenzi.

=== Filming ===
Principal photography of Il coltello di ghiaccio largely took place in Montseny in the Catalonia region of Spain. Because of the high altitude and frequent winds, the filming of sequences in the fog-filled streets proved difficult to shoot, as the wind carried away the fog produced by a fog machine. Visually, Lenzi was inspired by the shadowy cinematography of Jacques Tourneur's Cat People (1942); however, Lenzi stated he was unable to fully realize the visual elements he sought, as the cinematographer, José F. Aguayo, Jr.—of which Il coltello di ghiacco was his first feature—often over-lit the sets.

== Release ==
Il coltello di ghiaccio was released in Italy on 24 August 1972. It has also been distributed under the titles Vertigine, Knife of Ice, Detrás del Silencio, and The Ice Pick. By Lenzi's account, the film did not perform as well commercially in Europe as his previous features starring Baker, as it lacked the overt sex and violence of those films. However, Lenzi states that the film was better-received in the United States.

=== Critical response ===
Writing for AllMovie, Robert Firsching gave the film a rating of two-and-a-half stars out of five, adding that "despite its inconsistencies, [the film] should prove fascinating to genre devotees".

=== Home media ===
Wham! Media released a DVD of the film in 2009. The film was released on Blu-ray in a box set by Severin Films on 30 June 2020, featuring all four of Lenzi's film collaborations with actress Carroll Baker (including So Sweet... So Perverse, A Quiet Place to Kill, and Orgasmo).

== Sources ==
- Curti, Robert (2022). Italian Giallo in Film and Television: A Critical History. Jefferson, North Carolina: McFarland. ISBN 978-1-476-68248-8.
- Luther-Smith, Adrian (1999). Blood and Black Lace: The Definitive Guide to Italian Sex and Horror Movies. Stray Cat Publishing Ltd. ISBN 0-9533261-1-X.
