= Sylvia (1965 film) =

American film directed by Gordon Douglas

- Theatrical release poster
- Directed by: Gordon Douglas
- Screenplay by: Sydney Boehm
- Based on: Sylvia by E. V. Cunningham
- Produced by: Martin Poll
- Starring: Carroll Baker; George Maharis; Peter Lawford
- Cinematography: Joseph Ruttenberg
- Edited by: Frank Bracht
- Music by: David Raksin
- Production company: Marpol Productions
- Distributed by: Paramount Pictures
- Release date: December 31, 1964
- Running time: 115 minutes
- Country: United States
- Languages: English; French; Spanish
- Box office: $1.5 million

Sylvia is a 1965 American drama film directed by Gordon Douglas, written by Sydney Boehm, and starring Carroll Baker, George Maharis, and Peter Lawford. The film, based on the 1960 novel of the same name by E. V. Cunningham, focuses on a mysterious woman whose millionaire fiancé hires a detective to uncover the truth about her past.

== Plot ==
Middle-aged California millionaire Frederic Summers proposes marriage to Sylvia West. She is financially independent, writes poetry, and meets the criteria he seeks in a partner.

But as a precaution, Summers brings in a private investigator, the young Alan Macklin, to do a background check. Macklin travels to Sylvia's hometown of Pittsburgh, where to his surprise he learns that Sylvia has a history of selling sexual favors to middle-aged men. Librarian Irma tells Macklin that Sylvia always liked to read and helped her select literature from the library. She reads books in between clients to numb out her feelings. Raped by her stepfather, Jonas, she is an incest survivor who has a hard time setting boundaries. After her rape she turns to a fanatic priest who takes her to Mexico; he is later killed. She pays Oscar Stewart through sexual services to get her back to the United States on a road trip.

Back in the US, Sylvia becomes friends with Jane, a sex worker, and helps her out after a life-threatening accident. To pay her medical bills, Sylvia sells sexual services through a transvestite madam. Sylvia is raped and assaulted by one of the clients, Bruce Stamford III, who buys her off to keep quiet about it. She invests the payoff, using advice from Jane's husband; these investments help Sylvia become financially independent and she publishes her poetry.

Macklin meets Sylvia and says he is interested in her poetry; the two of them fall in love. He confesses that he has been investigating her for her husband, and she is upset. He refuses to give his report to Summers, Sylvia eventually forgives Macklin, and they get together in the end.

== Cast ==
- Carroll Baker as Sylvia West aka Sylvia Karoki
- Peter Lawford as Frederic Summers
- George Maharis as Alan Macklin
- Joanne Dru as Jane Phillips
- Viveca Lindfors as Irma Olanski
- Edmond O'Brien as Oscar Stewart
- Nancy Kovack as Big Shirley
- Ann Sothern as Grace Argona
- Jay Novello as Father Gonzales
- Aldo Ray as Jonas Karoki
- Lloyd Bochner as Bruce Stamford III
- Paul Gilbert as Lola Diamond
- Anthony Caruso as Muscles
- Val Avery as Pudgey Smith
- Paul Wexler at Peter Memel
- Majel Barrett as Anne

== Production ==
The film was based on a novel by E. V. Cunningham, a pen name for Howard Fast. The novel was published by Doubleday in 1960, and was popular enough for Fast to write other suspense-mystery novels under the pseudonym of E. V. Cunningham, with titles that were women's names. (Others included Penelope.)

Film rights were bought by producer Martin Poll in April 1961. Poll called the film "a suspense love story". He originally set the film up at Paramount as a coproduction with Paul Newman and Martin Ritt's company – Newman was going to star and Ritt direct. Fast was hired to write a script and filming was scheduled to start December 1961. This did not happen. The project was reactivated in 1964 with Sydney Boehm writing the script and Robert Reed as a possible star. Carroll Baker, who had just made The Carpetbaggers and Mister Moses, was hired to play the lead. David Miller was signed to direct. The male lead role eventually went to George Maharis, who recently had left the cast of the hit CBS dramatic series Route 66 after recovering from a bout with hepatitis that he had contracted while performing stunt work in a body of water during filming of that series. During filming of Sylvia, Miller was replaced as director by Gordon Douglas.

== Release ==
Paramount gave Sylvia a limited theatrical run on December 31, 1964 in select U.S. cities, including Asbury Park, New Jersey, Miami, Florida, Portland, Oregon, Rochester, New York, and San Francisco, California. The film subsequently had a wide release beginning with its New York City premiere on February 10, 1965.

=== Home media ===
On June 11, 2025, the Australian label Imprint Films released Sylvia for the first time on Blu-ray as part of a Carroll Baker three-film set alongside Something Wild (1961) and Harlow (1963).

== Reception ==
=== Critical response ===
Bosley Crowther of The New York Times called it a "travesty of a film... it is hard to tell whether Carroll Baker... is worse than the script. Both are incredibly awful. Miss Baker is as lifeless as a stick, and the script... is a collection of all the clichés of bordello literature" and said that Gordon Douglas and Martin Poll "should both have their mouths washed out, their wrists slapped and their credentials as filmmakers taken away."

The staff at Variety wrote in their review: "Carroll Baker is joined in stellar spot by George Maharis as the private eye who ultimately falls in love with the woman he is tracing. Actually, although hers is the motivating character, top honours go to Maharis for a consistently restrained performance which builds, while actress suffers somewhat from the spotty nature of her haphazard part."

== See also ==
- List of American films of 1965
