= The Sweet Body of Deborah =

- Directed by: Romolo Guerrieri
- Screenplay by: Ernesto Gastaldi
- Story by: Ernesto Gastaldi; Luciano Martino
- Produced by: Mino Loy; Luciano Martino
- Starring: Carroll Baker; Jean Sorel; Evelyn Stewart; Luigi Pistilli; George Hilton
- Cinematography: Marcello Masciocchi
- Edited by: Eugenio Alabiso
- Music by: Nora Orlandi
- Production companies: Flora Film; Zenith Cinematografica; Lux C.C.F.
- Distributed by: Variety Film
- Release dates: March 1968 (Italy); February 1969 (Paris)
- Running time: 95 minutes
- Countries: Italy; France
- Box office: $1.6 million (Italy)

The Sweet Body of Deborah (Italian: Il dolce corpo di Deborah) is a 1968 giallo film directed by Romolo Guerrieri and starring Carroll Baker and Jean Sorel. It was written by Ernesto Gastaldi based on a story by Gastaldi and producer Luciano Martino.

Set in Geneva, the film follows a recently married American woman who finds herself in danger after a stranger begins to target her husband and accuse him of murdering an ex-fiance named Susan.

== Plot ==
Deborah and Marcel return to Geneva from their honeymoon. Marcel learns of his former fiancée Susan's suicide, and is confronted by a man named Philip who accuses him of murdering her. Marcel begins to receive threats from someone who holds him responsible for Susan's death. His new bride Deborah also becomes the target of these threats, and a weird neighbor named Robert with voyeuristic tendencies begins fixating on her as well.

== Cast ==
- Carroll Baker as Deborah
- Jean Sorel as Marcel
- George Hilton as Robert, the voyeur
- Evelyn Stewart as Susan / Suzanne Boileau
- Luigi Pistilli as Philip

== Production ==
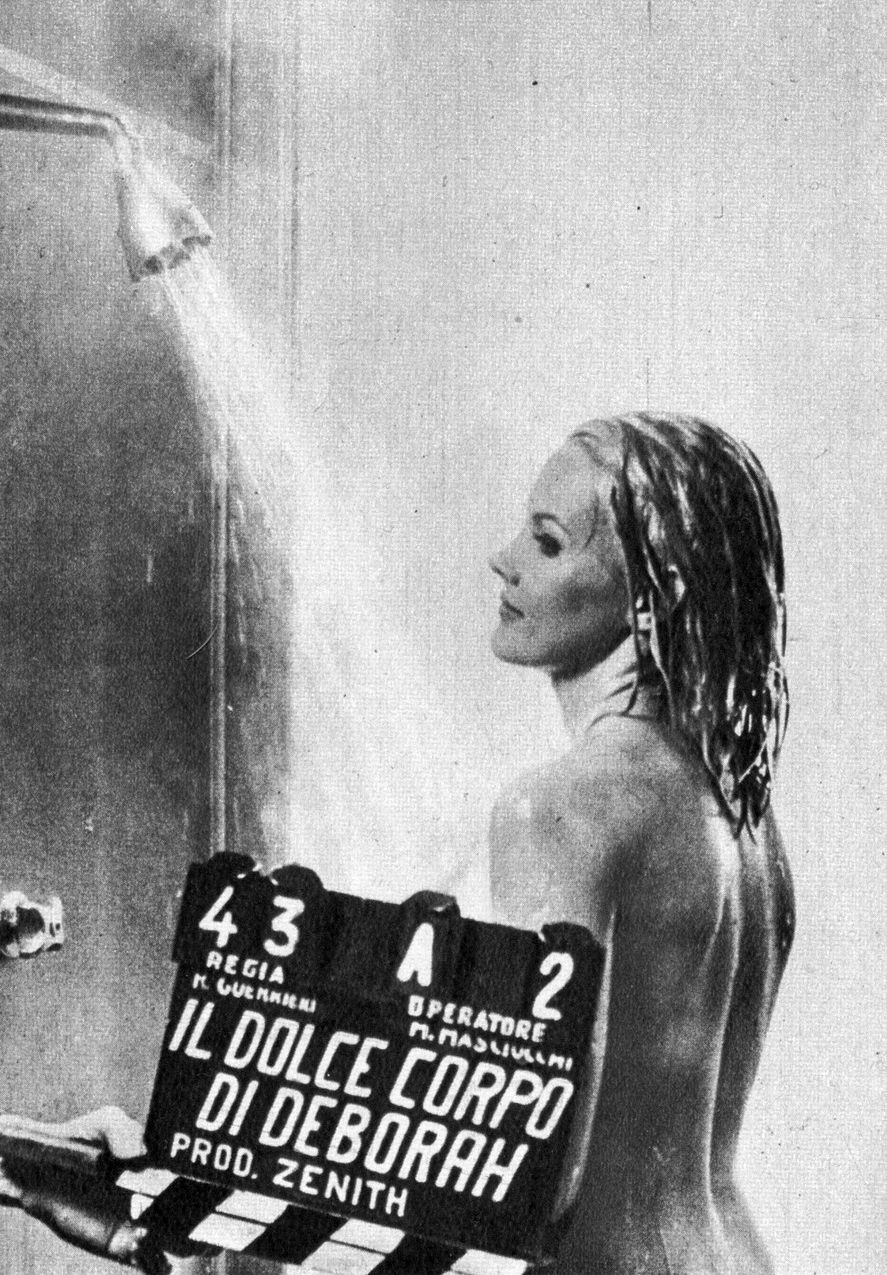
Carroll Baker in a behind-the-scenes production still

In the mid-1960s, Carroll Baker was marked as being a sex symbol following her posing in Playboy magazine. She was then fired by Paramount, separated from her husband Jack Garfein and moved to Europe to continue her career. Baker was popular in Italy, where film audiences were still fond of her from performances in films like Baby Doll (1956), a film that was initially banned in Italy. In December 1966, Baker arrived in Italy to Marco Ferreri's film Her Harem. The film was a hit and led to her to soon start shooting two films: One Step Up which did not complete filming, and another film titled Honeymoon set to be directed by Brunello Rondi. Rondi dropped out of the project, while its plot, locations and character's names were used in The Sweet Body of Deborah.

Screenwriter Ernesto Gastaldi was adamant that Rondi was not involved at all in the pre-production of The Sweet Body of Deborah and the script at Rome's CSC archives only have it signed by Gastaldi and Luciano Martino as authors of the scenario and Gastaldi alone as the screenwriter. The new director Romolo Guerrieri stated he did not like the script, predominantly due to its erotic contents. He was convinced by Martino to accept to do the film based on the two leads. The film was shot in English.

== Release ==
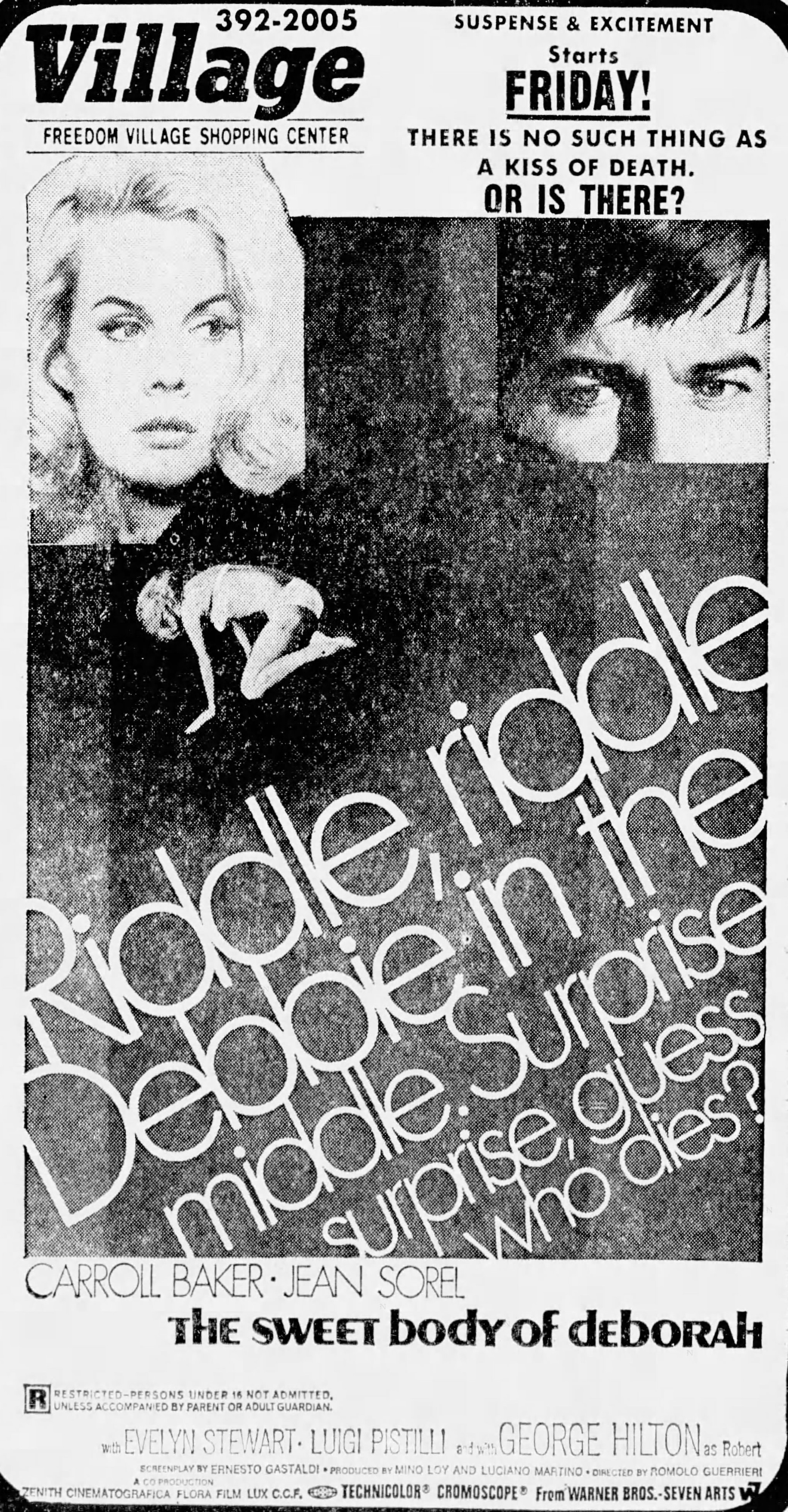
U.S. theatre advertisement

The Sweet Body of Deborah was released in Italy in March 1968 as Il dolce corpo di Deborah. The film later opened in Paris in February 1969 as L'adorable corps de Deborah. In the United States, where the film was distributed by Warner Bros.-Seven Arts, it opened in Detroit on March 12, 1969. The film was a box office hit in Italy, inspiring a number of similar thrillers starring Carroll Baker, but was not as successful in the United Kingdom and United States, and marked the beginning of actress Carroll Baker's career in Europe starring in giallo and horror films. It grossed a total of 587 million lire on its release in Italy.

== Reception ==
The New York Times gave The Sweet Body of Deborah a middling review, with critic Vincent Canby noting the film's "disembodied narrative—[it is] a movie without any real national identity that seems to have sprung into existence not because of any artistic urgency but because somebody could make a deal." In Variety, "Murf." noted "contrived direction and photography, lifeless dubbing and careless production mark this Italo-French co-production, which Warner Bros.-Severn Arts can ride to okay first playoff." The Saturday Review gave the film a positive review, noting that: "the film's unstinting effort to entertain at all costs is both welcome and refreshing."

Due to its nude scenes involving Baker, The Sweet Body of Deborah drew attention upon its initial release for its then-daring sex appeal. New York Magazine (May 12, 1969, p. 45) republished a snippet of a review by John Mahoney for The Hollywood Reporter, which contained an extensive and detailed description of Baker's nude body as it appeared in the film.
