= Gianfranco Piccioli =

Italian film director and producer (1944–2022)

- Born: 26 February 1944; Viareggio, Tuscany, Italy
- Died: 27 November 2022 (aged 78); Italy
- Occupation(s): Film director Screenwriter; Film producer

Gianfranco Piccioli (26 February 1944 – 27 November 2022) was an Italian film director, film producer and screenwriter best known for such films as The Flower with the Petals of Steel, Beach House, Bix, and The Pool Hustlers.

== Career ==
Born in Viareggio, Piccioli graduated in arts, music and entertainment disciplines at the University of Bologna. He entered the film industry serving as script supervisor in Maurizio Arena's Gli altri, gli altri... e noi.

After directing some shorts and some TV reports, he made his feature film debut in 1972, with Doppio a metà. After directing a giallo (The Flower with the Petals of Steel) and a prison-heist film (Puttana galera), starting from Sergio Citti's Beach House Piccioli devoted himself to production. As a producer, he was often interested in risky, unconventional ideas (such as Davide Ferrario's We All Fall Down) and in passion projects of established auteurs which had proved to be difficult to fund (such as Pupi Avati's Bix and Salvatore Samperi's Liquirizia). Piccioli is best known for having launched the film careers of Alessandro Benvenuti and Francesco Nuti, with whom he also founded the production company Union PN. He retired in 2015.
