= Private Lessons (1975 film) =

1975 film by Vittorio De Sisti

- Directed by: Vittorio De Sisti
- Written by: Vittorio de Sisti; Paolo Brigeni
- Story by: Paolo Brigeni
- Produced by: Enzo Doria
- Starring: Carroll Baker
- Cinematography: Mario Masini
- Edited by: Angelo Curi
- Music by: Franco Micalizzi
- Distributed by: Variety Distribution
- Release date: 1975
- Country: Italy
- Language: Italian

Private Lessons (Italian: Lezioni private, also known as The Private Lesson) is a 1975 Italian commedia sexy all'italiana film directed by Vittorio De Sisti that stars Carroll Baker.

== Plot ==
At a college run by Catholic priests, Laura arrives as the new piano teacher. An attractive blonde, she is single and devoted to her art. Alessandro, handsome 17-year-old virgin son of a possessive mother, falls instantly in love with her. This is perceived by Emanuela, the girl who hopes to conquer him, and by Gabriele, her secretly gay brother who has the same dream. Alessandro's mother, completely unaware of these emotional cross-currents, hires Laura to give him additional lessons in their home.

Gabriele senses an opportunity when he comes across a vantage point where he can look into Laura's apartment and, borrowing a sophisticated camera, is able to take shots of her naked and playing with herself, which he then uses to blackmail her into exposing her body progressively to Alessandro. Although excited, the boy is bemused at this behaviour, while Laura is deeply humiliated.

At the end of term, Alessandro escapes this tense environment by going to stay with his earthy uncle in the country and has an encounter with a maid, which gives him sexual confidence. Going home, he starts trying his newfound skills on Emanuela, but they are interrupted and he hides in Gabriele's room. There he finds the photographs and negatives of Laura, which he takes to her. They confront Gabriele, who sees that his plot has failed, and Laura rewards her saviour with a long night together. In the morning she explains that a relationship would not work, so he goes back to an eager Emanuela.

== Cast ==
- Carroll Baker: Laura Formenti
- Rosalino Cellamare: Alessandro Corsini
- Leonora Fani: Emanuela Finzi
- Emilio Locurcio: Gabriele Finzi, brother of Emanuela
- Carlo Giuffrè: Luigi, Alessandro's father
- Leopoldo Trieste: The exhibitionist
- Renzo Montagnani: Giulio, Alessandro's uncle
- Femi Benussi: Rosina, Giulio's maid
- Eugene Walter: Uncle of Emanuela
