= Tappan Zee Playhouse =

- Broadway Theatre
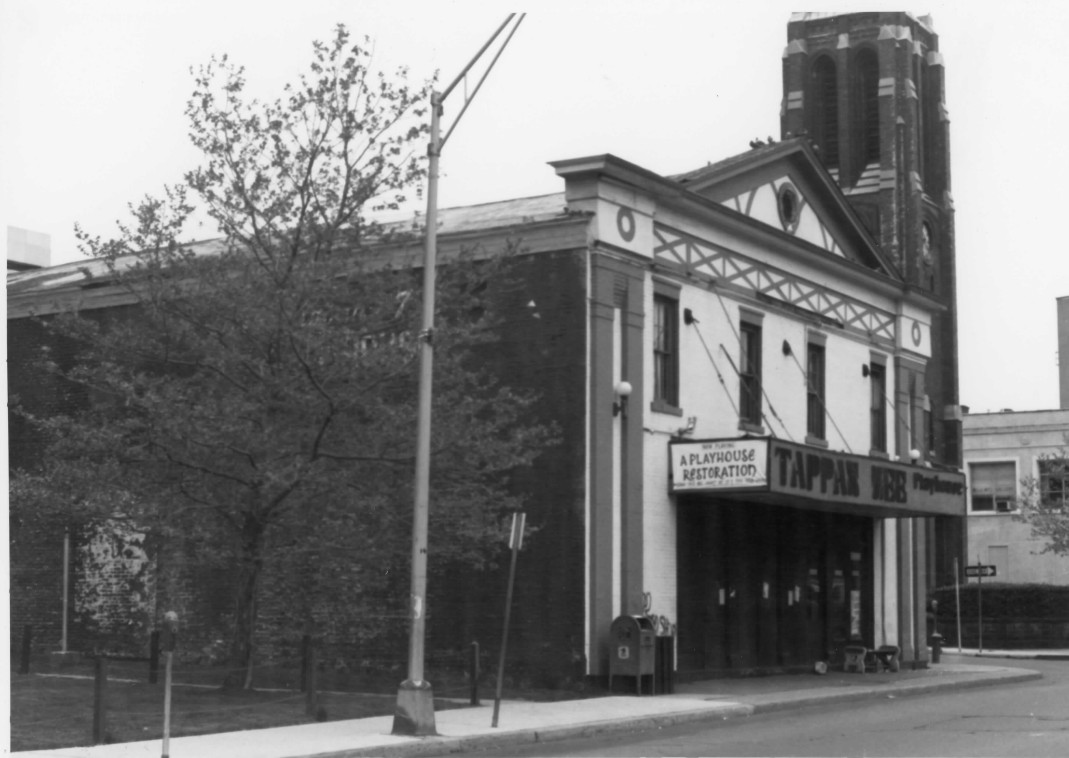
- The theater in 1981
- Interactive map of Tappan Zee Playhouse
- Address: 20 S. Broadway; Nyack, New York; United States
- Current use
- Tappan Zee Playhouse
- U.S. National Register of Historic Places
- Location within New York Location within the United States
- Coordinates: 41°5′24″N 73°55′9″W
- Area: less than one acre
- Architectural style: Classical Revival, Neo-Classical Revival
- NRHP reference No.: 83001788
- Added to NRHP: July 21, 1983

Construction
- Opened: 1911
- Demolished: April 2004

Tappan Zee Playhouse, built in 1911 as the Broadway Theater, was a historic theatre located at Nyack in Rockland County, New York. It consisted of an early 20th-century lobby and theatre structure in front and stage house in rear. The stage house was a large, converted 19th century stable. It was demolished in April 2004.

It was listed on the National Register of Historic Places in 1983.
