= Carroll Baker =

American actress (born 1931)

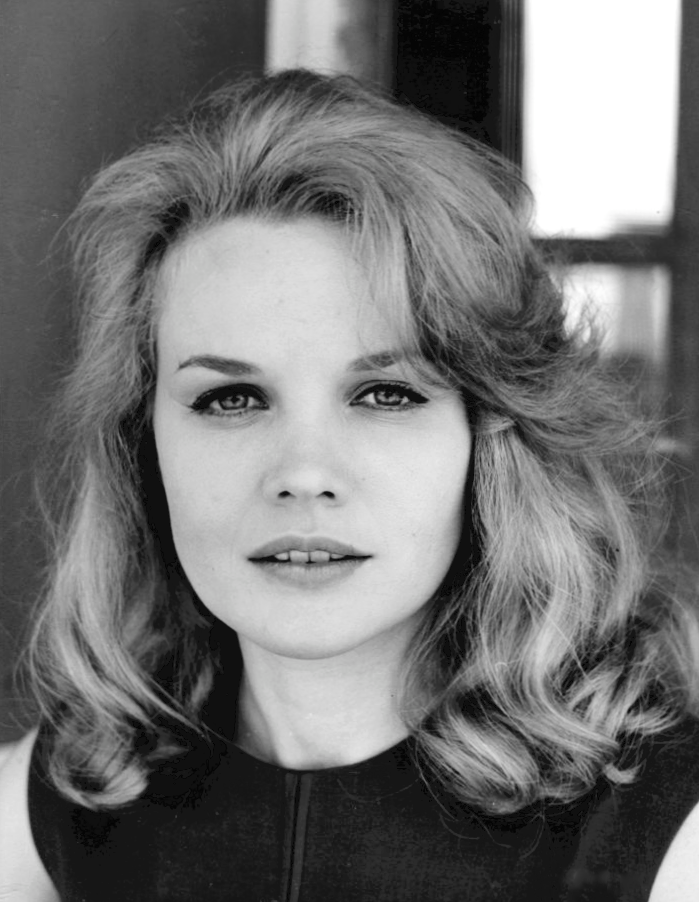
- Baker in 1962
- Born: May 28, 1931 (age 95); Johnstown, Pennsylvania, U.S.
- Education: St. Petersburg College
- Occupations: Actress; writer
- Years active: 1951–2007
- Notable work: Baby Doll (1956); Giant (1956); The Big Country (1958); Something Wild (1961); How the West Was Won (1962); The Carpetbaggers (1964); The Greatest Story Ever Told (1965); Harlow (1965); Star 80 (1983); Native Son (1986); Kindergarten Cop (1990)
- Spouses: Louie Ritter (m. 1953; div. 1953) Jack Garfein (m. 1955; div. 1969) Donald Burton (m. 1982; died 2007)
- Children: Blanche Baker; Herschel Garfein

Carroll Baker (born May 28, 1931) is a retired American actress. After studying under Lee Strasberg at the Actors Studio, Baker began performing on Broadway in 1954. From there, she was recruited by director Elia Kazan to play the lead in the adaptation of two Tennessee Williams plays into the film Baby Doll in 1956. Her role in the film as a coquettish but sexually naïve Southern bride earned her a nomination for the Academy Award for Best Actress.

Baker had other early film roles in Giant (1956) and the romantic comedy But Not for Me (1959). In 1961, she appeared in the controversial independent film Something Wild, directed by her then-husband Jack Garfein, playing a traumatized rape victim. She went on to star in several critically acclaimed Westerns in the 1950s and 1960s, such as The Big Country (1958), How the West Was Won (1962), and Cheyenne Autumn (1964).

In the mid-1960s, as a contract player for Paramount Pictures, Baker became a sex symbol after appearing as a hedonistic widow in The Carpetbaggers (1964). The film's producer, Joseph E. Levine, cast her in Sylvia before giving her the role of Jean Harlow in the biopic Harlow (1965). Despite significant prepublicity, Harlow was a critical failure, and Baker relocated to Italy in 1966 amid a legal dispute over her contract with Paramount and Levine's overseeing of her career. In Europe, she spent the next 10 years starring in hard-edged giallo and horror films, including Romolo Guerrieri's The Sweet Body of Deborah (1968), a series of four films with Umberto Lenzi beginning with Orgasmo (1969) and ending with Knife of Ice (1972), and Corrado Farina's Baba Yaga (1973). She re-emerged for American audiences as a character actress in the Andy Warhol–produced dark comedy Bad (1977).

Baker appeared in supporting roles in several acclaimed dramas in the 1980s, including the true-crime drama Star 80 (1983) as the mother of murder victim Dorothy Stratten, and the racial drama Native Son (1986), based on the novel by Richard Wright. In 1987, she had a supporting part in Ironweed (1987). Through the 1990s, Baker had guest roles in several television series, such as Murder, She Wrote; L.A. Law, and Roswell. She also had supporting parts in several big-budget films, such as Kindergarten Cop (1990) and the David Fincher–directed thriller The Game (1997). She formally retired from acting in 2003. In addition to acting, Baker is also the author of two autobiographies and two novels.

== Early life and education ==
Baker was born and raised in Johnstown, Pennsylvania, into a Catholic family, the daughter of Edith Gertrude (née Duffy) and William Watson Baker, a traveling salesman. Baker is of Irish and Polish descent, which has given rise to a rumor that her birth name was Karolina Piekarski, (Note: Dating as far back as April 2006, the Internet Movie Database listed Baker's alleged birth name as Karolina Piekarski.) though this currently cannot be substantiated by known records. (Note: Mentions of Baker having been born Karolina Piekarski date back to at least 2006 when the name appeared on the Internet Movie Database, and the claim has been republished in works such as Guia de Cine Clásico (2006; ISBN 978-8-498-21388-1), and Hollywood Winners & Losers A to Z (2008; ISBN 978-0-879-10351-4). Aside from these publications, however, no historical or census documentation corroborates the claim, and Baker herself has not publicly addressed it.) Her parents separated when she was eight years old, and she moved with her mother and younger sister, Virginia, to Turtle Creek, Pennsylvania. According to Baker, her mother struggled as a single parent, and the family was poor for much of her upbringing.

Baker attended Greensburg High School (now known as Greensburg Salem) in Greensburg, Pennsylvania, where she was a debate team member and active in the marching band and school musicals. At 18, she moved with her family to St. Petersburg, Florida, where she attended St. Petersburg Junior College (now St. Petersburg College). After her first year in college, she began working as a magician's assistant on the vaudeville circuit and joined a dance company, working as a professional dancer. In 1949, Baker won the title of Miss Florida Fruits and Vegetables. In 1951, Baker moved to New York City, where she rented a dirt-floor basement apartment in Queens. She worked as a nightclub dancer and also had stints as a chorus girl in traveling vaudeville shows, which took her to Windsor, Detroit, and New Jersey.

Baker studied acting at HB Studio. In 1952, she enrolled at the Actors Studio and studied under Lee Strasberg. There, she was a classmate of Mike Nichols, Rod Steiger, Shelley Winters, Ben Gazzara, and Marilyn Monroe. Baker had a fling with Gazzara at that time, of which she said “I had a very strict upbringing; my mother was raised by nuns. I was a faithful wife until my divorce – then I went crazy. I was famous, people came up to me and yes, I enjoyed sex so much!". She also became a close friend of James Dean for the rest of his life.

== Career ==
=== 1952–1957: Beginnings ===
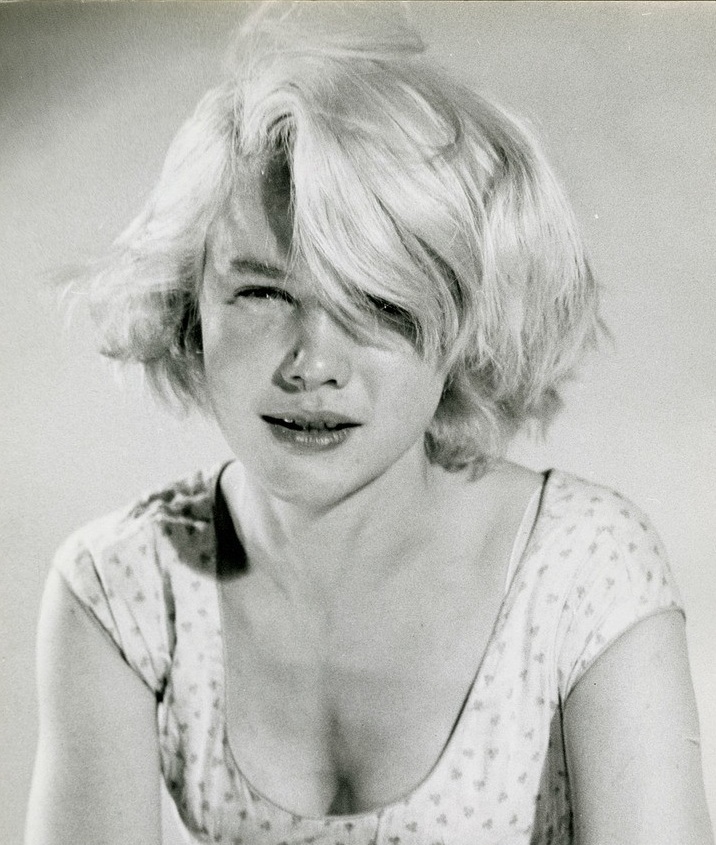
Baker in a publicity photo for Baby Doll by Peter Basch in 1956

After appearing in television commercials for Winston cigarettes and Coca-Cola, Baker was featured in an episode of Monodrama Theater performing a monodramatic piece, which was broadcast in 1952 on the DuMont Network. The following year, she made her film debut with a small, walk-on part in the musical Easy to Love (1953). This led to her landing roles in two Broadway productions: Roger MacDougall's Escapade in the fall of 1953, and Robert Anderson's All Summer Long, opposite Ed Begley, which ran from September to mid-November 1954. In 1955, she screen tested and auditioned for the lead role in Picnic, but lost the part to Kim Novak. She was also considered for the lead in Rebel Without a Cause (1955) after James Dean recommended her for the part to director Nicholas Ray, which she turned down.

Baker's first major screen role was the supporting part of Luz Benedict II in Giant (1956), opposite Elizabeth Taylor, Rock Hudson, and James Dean, in his final role. According to Baker, she had been offered numerous leading parts in feature films before that point, but chose to debut in a supporting role in Giant because she was "insecure" and "wanted to start out a little less 'profile'." Giant was largely filmed in the small town of Marfa, Texas, in 1955; Baker recalled her experience on set, saying that James Dean and she were both enamored of Rock Hudson and Elizabeth Taylor while filming.

Simultaneously, Baker was cast as the title character in Elia Kazan's Baby Doll (1956), a role initially intended for Marilyn Monroe. Tennessee Williams, who had written and developed the screenplay based on two of his one-act plays, wanted Baker to play the part after seeing her perform a scene from his script at the Actors Studio; likewise, Kazan had been impressed by her performance in All Summer Long on Broadway the year prior. Shot in Benoit, Mississippi, directly after Baker had completed Giant, her role in the film as a sexually repressed teenaged bride to a failed middle-aged cotton gin owner brought Baker overnight fame and a level of notoriety even before the film's release. During shooting, Baker was prohibited from eating around photographers in order to get better photos, bringing her weight down to just 110 pounds. In the fall of 1956, artist Robert Everheart, under contract with Warner Bros., constructed a 135-foot-tall (41 m) billboard in Times Square promoting the film, depicting the now-iconic image of a scantily clad Baker lying in a crib sucking her thumb. The controversial advertising campaign for the film caused a pre-emptive backlash from religious groups, and on December 16, 1956, Cardinal Francis Spellman of St. Patrick's Cathedral denounced the film and advised his parish against seeing it. A formal condemnation by the Roman Catholic National Legion of Decency ensued, which considered it "grievously offensive to Christian and traditional standards of morality and decency".

In spite of this, Baby Doll opened to strong box-office receipts, grossing $51,232 in its first week at the Victoria Theater. In support of Baker, Marilyn Monroe appeared at the film's premiere, working as an usherette to help bolster ticket sales, the proceeds of which were donated to the Actors Studio. Baker received immense critical praise for her performance. Variety said that her performance "captures all the animal charm, the naivete, the vanity, contempt and rising passion of Baby Doll", while Bosley Crowther of The New York Times praised Baker's ability to exhibit "a piteously flimsy little twist of juvenile greed, inhibitions, physical yearnings, common crudities and conceits". Baby Doll established Baker as an A-list actress and would remain the film for which she is best remembered. She was nominated for an Academy Award for Best Actress for her performance, a Golden Globe Award for Best Actress in a Motion Picture – Drama, and won a Golden Globe for Most Promising Newcomer, which she shared with Jayne Mansfield and Natalie Wood. The performance also earned her a Film Achievement Award from Look, as well as the title "Woman of the Year" in 1957 from Harvard University's Hasty Pudding Club. She appeared on the cover of Life Magazine in June 1956.

=== 1958–1963: Contract disputes and independent films ===
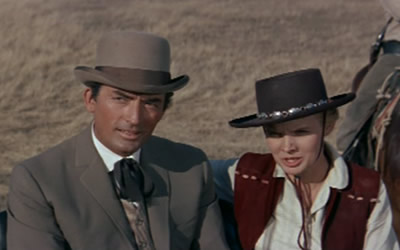
Baker with Gregory Peck in The Big Country in 1958

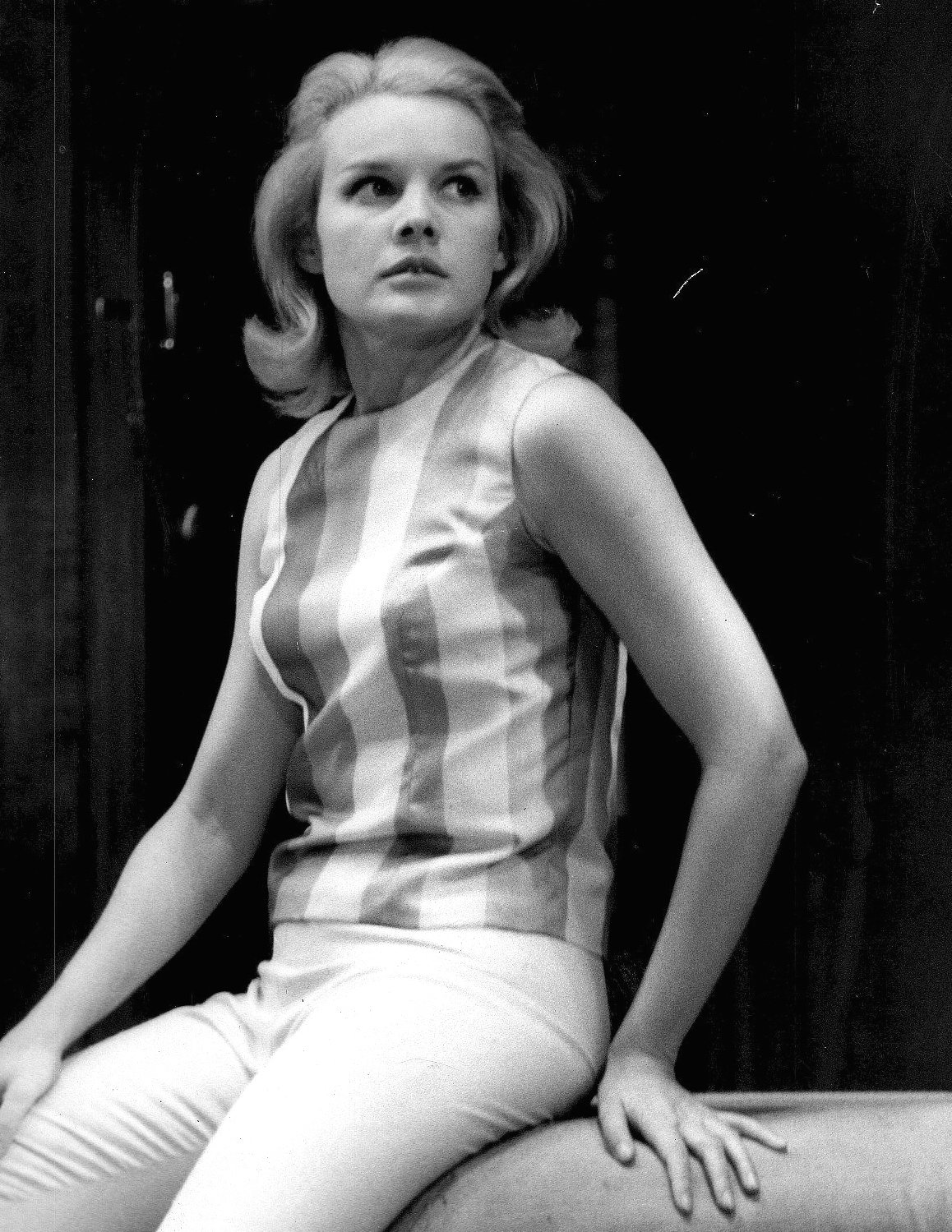
Baker in the Broadway production of Come on Strong in September 1962

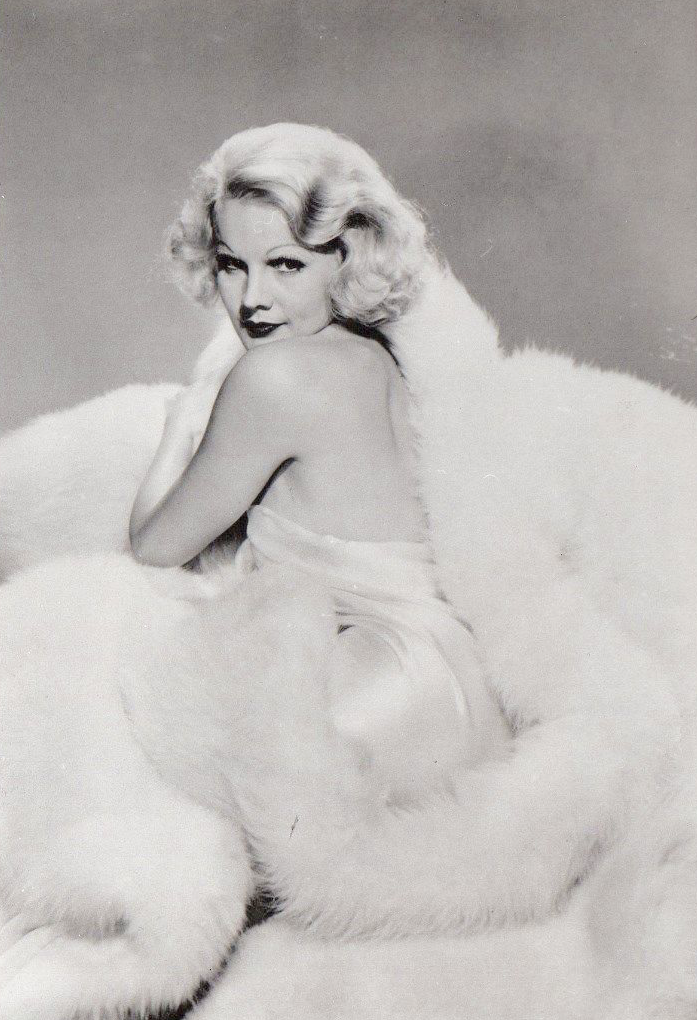
Baker in her role as Jean Harlow on the cover of the November 2, 1963, edition of The Saturday Evening Post

After the success of Baby Doll, Baker was subsequently offered parts in The Brothers Karamazov (1958), Too Much, Too Soon (1958), and The Devil's Disciple (1959). She refused to make Too Much Too Soon, so Warner Bros. put her on suspension, which prevented her from starring in The Brothers Karamazov (1958) at MGM. Baker was also chosen by MGM for the lead in Cat on a Hot Tin Roof (1958) and by Twentieth Century Fox for The Three Faces of Eve (1957), but her contract with Warner Bros. again prevented her from accepting the roles. Tensions between Baker and the studio escalated further when she went against their wishes by appearing in Arms and the Man on stage. Baker commented on the effect of the system on her career, saying: "I came in at the end of the big studio system. I still had a slave contract and they were willing to put you in almost anything they had."

After her suspension with Warner Bros. was lifted, Baker appeared in William Wyler's Western epic The Big Country (1958). The film was well received by critics, though the shoot was described as "problematic": Baker was four months pregnant at the time and had to wear restraining garments, and director Wyler reportedly had her on the verge of tears after forcing her to repeat the same take over 60 times, only to use the first one. She followed The Big Country with lead roles in two romances, portraying a nun in The Miracle (1959), co-starring Roger Moore, and in But Not for Me (1959), a comedy with Clark Gable. The New York Times praised Baker's performance in But Not for Me, saying: "Miss Baker, being a young lady who not only has looks, but also can act, makes you understand why Mr. Gable would like to cheat a little bit on Father Time." She disliked The Miracle so much that she bought out her contract with Warner Bros., putting her in considerable debt. But Not for Me was made at Paramount.

Baker went on to make the experimental film Something Wild (1961), directed by her then-husband Jack Garfein. In this independent production, she plays a young college student from the Bronx who is raped one night in St. James Park, and later held captive by a Manhattan mechanic (Ralph Meeker), who witnessed her subsequent suicide attempt. In preparation for her role, Baker lived alone in a boarding house in New York's Lower East Side, and gained employment as a department-store salesgirl; her Method approach to the role was profiled in Life magazine in 1960. Critical reaction to the film was largely negative, though Film Quarterly cited it as "the most interesting American film of its quarter", and the most underrated film of 1961. However, its controversial depiction of rape led to critical backlash and public criticism, and the film has been credited by historians as nearly halting Baker's career. The same year, she portrayed Gwen Harold in Bridge to the Sun (1961), a production by MGM based on the 1957 best-selling autobiography of a Tennessee-born woman who married a Japanese diplomat (portrayed by James Shigeta) and became one of the few Americans to live in Japan during World War II. While only a modest success at the box office, the film was well received by critics and was America's entry at the Venice International Film Festival.

After this, Baker appeared in the independent British-German film Station Six-Sahara (1962) as a woman who provokes tensions at an oil station in the Sahara Desert, as well as the blockbuster Western epic How the West Was Won (1962), opposite James Stewart and Debbie Reynolds and former co-stars Gregory Peck and Karl Malden. In addition to film acting, Baker also found time to appear again on Broadway, starring in the 1962 production of Garson Kanin's Come on Strong in the fall of that year. In 1963, Baker relocated permanently with then-husband Jack Garfein and their two children to Los Angeles, where she based herself for the next several years. She traveled to Kenya to film Mister Moses (1965), where publicized rumors spread that she and co-star Robert Mitchum were having an affair, which they both vehemently denied. Another story, now considered apocryphal, had it that a Maasai chief in Kenya offered 150 cows, 200 goats, sheep, and $750 for her hand in marriage. She subsequently appeared with Maasai warriors on the cover of Life's July 1964 issue.

=== 1964–1966: Sex symbol roles ===
Baker portrayed a pacifist Quaker schoolteacher in John Ford's Cheyenne Autumn (1964), and received critical acclaim for the role. She then had a supporting role as Saint Veronica in George Stevens' The Greatest Story Ever Told (1965), and portrayed a cynical, alcoholic movie star in The Carpetbaggers (1964), which brought her a second wave of notoriety in spite of the film's lackluster reviews. The New York Times called the film "a sickly sour distillation" of the source novel, but said Baker's performance "brought some color and a sandpaper personality as the sex-loaded widow." The film was the top moneymaker of that year, with domestic box-office receipts of $13 million, and marked the beginning of a tumultuous relationship with the film's producer, Joseph E. Levine.

Based on her Carpetbaggers performance, Levine began to develop Baker as a movie sex symbol, and she appeared posing in the December 1964 issue of Playboy. She was subsequently cast by Levine in the title roles of two 1965 potboilers— Sylvia, as an ex-prostitute and con artist, and as Jean Harlow in Harlow. Baker appeared on the cover of The Saturday Evening Post on their November 2, 1963, issue dressed as Harlow, promoting the film's upcoming production. In 1965, she became an official celebrity spokesperson for Foster Grant sunglasses and appeared in advertisements for the company. Baker likened this era of her career to "being a beauty contest winner [as opposed to] an actress".

Despite much prepublicity, Harlow received a lukewarm response from critics: Variety referred to Baker's portrayal of Harlow as "a fairly reasonable facsimile, although she lacks the electric fire of the original." Relations between Baker and Levine soured; in a 1965 interview, Baker sardonically commented: "I'll say this about Joe Levine: I admire his taste in leading ladies", which led the press to suspect a rift between the actress and producer. Baker sued Levine in 1966 over her contract with Paramount Pictures, and was ultimately fired by Paramount and had her paychecks from Harlow frozen amid the contentious legal dispute; this left Baker hundreds of thousands of dollars in debt (however, she was eventually awarded $1 million in compensation).

In an interview with Rex Reed in his book People Are Crazy Here (1974), Baker revealed that she had felt pressure in both her working relationship with Levine, and her domestic life with her husband who she said wanted to maintain an expensive lifestyle: "We'd been very poor when we started out at the Actors Studio in New York", she told Reed. "I was under contract to Joe Levine, who was going around giving me diamonds and behaving like he owned me. I never slept with him or anything, but everyone thought I was his mistress." In the spring of 1966, Baker returned to theatre, performing in a production of Anna Christie at the Huntington Hartford Theater in Los Angeles. The production was directed by Garfein. The production was heralded as the "theatre event of the week" in Los Angeles, though its reception was middling. Cecil Smith of the Los Angeles Times wrote of the production: "The beautiful Miss Baker's vehicle becomes a hearse." The play was also performed at the Tappan Zee Playhouse in Nyack, New York in June 1966.

=== 1967–1975: European films ===
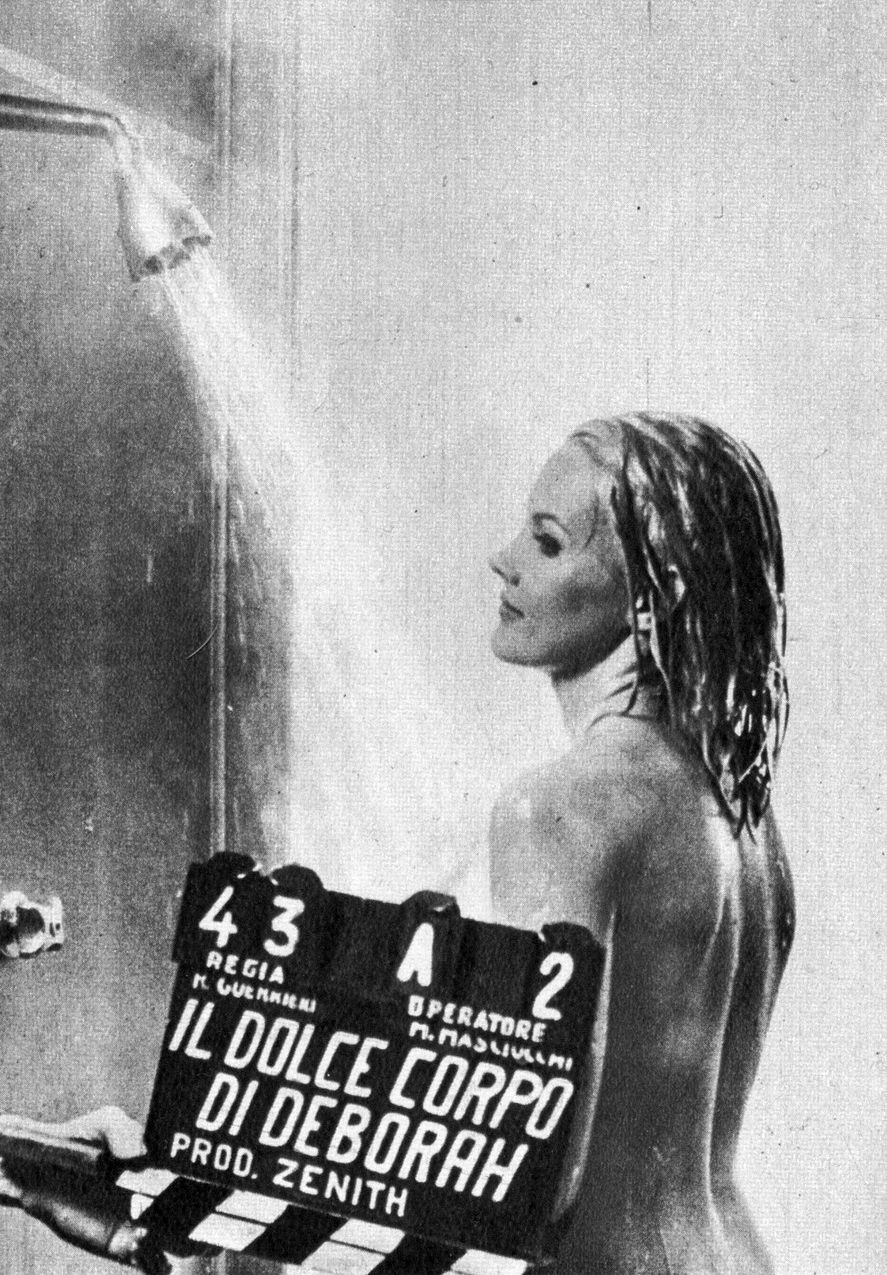
Baker in Il dolce corpo di Deborah (1968)

Baker separated from her second husband, Jack Garfein, in 1967, and moved to Europe with her two children to pursue a career there after struggling to find work in Hollywood. Eventually settling in Rome, Baker became fluent in Italian and spent the next several years starring in hard-edged giallo, exploitation, and horror films. In 1966, Baker had been invited to the Venice International Film Festival, where she met director Marco Ferreri, who asked her to play the lead role in Her Harem (1967). This was followed with the horror films The Sweet Body of Deborah (1968) and The Devil Has Seven Faces (1971). Baker also starred in So Sweet... So Perverse (1969), Orgasmo (1969), A Quiet Place to Kill (1970), and Il coltello di ghiaccio (Knife of Ice) (1972), all giallo films directed by Italian filmmaker Umberto Lenzi.

Many of these films feature her in roles as distressed women, and often showed Baker in nude scenes, which few major Hollywood actors were willing to do at the time. Baker became a favorite of Umberto Lenzi, with her best-known role being in the aforementioned Paranoia, where she played a wealthy widow tormented by two sadistic siblings. In his review of Paranoia, Roger Ebert said: "Carroll Baker, who was a Hollywood sex symbol (for some, it is said) until she sued Joe Levine and got blacklisted, has been around. She may not be an actress, but she can act. In The Carpetbaggers, there was a nice wholesome vulgarity to her performance. She is not intrinsically as bad as she appears in Paranoia. I think maybe she was saying 'the hell with it', and having a good time." As with Paranoia, the majority of the films she made in Italy received poor critical reception in the United States, though they afforded Baker—who had left Hollywood in debt and with two children to support— an income, as well as fame abroad. In retrospect, Baker commented on her career in Italy and on her exploitation film roles, saying: "I think I made more films [there] than I made in Hollywood, but the mentality is different. What they think is wonderful is not what we might ... it was marvelous for me because it really brought me back to life, and it gave me a whole new outlook. It's wonderful to know about a different world."

She followed her roles in Lenzi's films with a leading role in Corrado Farina's Baba Yaga (1973) as the titular witch, alongside Isabelle De Funès and George Eastman. TV Guide referred to the film as an "exceptionally handsome example of 1970s Italian pop-exploitation filmmaking sweetened by Piero Umilani's lounge-jazz score", and praised Baker's performance, but noted that she was "physically wrong for the role; her elaborate lace-and-beribboned costumes sometimes make her look more like a fleshy Miss Havisham than a sleekly predatory sorceress".

=== 1976–1987: Return to American films; theater ===
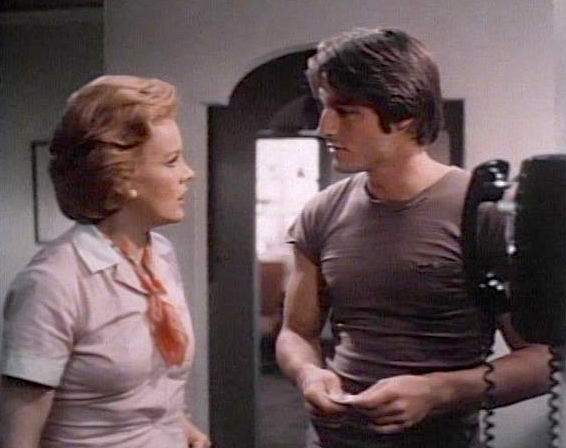
Baker with Perry King in Andy Warhol's Bad in 1977

Baker's first American film in over 10 years came in the Andy Warhol–produced black comedy Bad (1977), in which she plays the lead role of a Queens beauty salon owner who provides hitmen with jobs, starring alongside Susan Tyrrell and Perry King. "You can hardly call making an Andy Warhol movie a 'comeback'", said Baker. "It's more like going to the moon! The subject is totally unique."

She followed Bad with a part in the low-budget surrealist thriller The Sky Is Falling (1979) with Dennis Hopper, playing a washed-up actress living among expatriates in a Spanish village. The 1970s also had a return to the stage for Baker, where she appeared in British theater productions of Bell, Book, and Candle; Rain, an adaptation of a story by W. Somerset Maugham; Lucy Crown, an adaptation of the novel by Irwin Shaw; and Motive. In 1978, while touring England and Ireland in productions of Motive, Baker met stage actor Donald Burton, who became her third husband. She also appeared in American stage productions of Georges Feydeau's 13 Rue de l'Amour, Forty Carats, and Goodbye Charlie.

By the 1980s Baker had largely become a character actress, and was based in London. She starred in a supporting role in the 1980 Walt Disney-produced horror film The Watcher in the Woods, alongside Bette Davis, after having been asked by British director John Hough, a longtime admirer of her work. After an appearance in the British television film Red Monarch (1983), she played the mother of murdered Playboy model Dorothy Stratten (played by Mariel Hemingway) in the biopic Star 80 (1983). She also appeared as the mother of Sigmund Freud in the historical comedy The Secret Diary of Sigmund Freud (1984) with Carol Kane and Klaus Kinski.

Baker featured in Hitler's SS: Portrait in Evil (1985), a coming-of-age drama set against Nazi Germany, as well as in the drama Native Son (1986), based on the novel by Richard Wright, which featured Matt Dillon, Geraldine Page, and a young Oprah Winfrey. In the latter Baker plays a 1930s Chicago housewife, mother of a teenage girl accidentally killed by an African American chauffeur, who attempts to cover up the accident. Critic Roger Ebert praised Baker's performance, noting her "powerful" scene with Winfrey during the film's finale.

Following Native Son, Baker had a critically acclaimed lead role as the wife of a schizophrenic drifter (played by Jack Nicholson) in Ironweed (1987), alongside Meryl Streep. Her performance in the film was praised by Ebert, who said: "Nicholson's homecoming [in the film] is all the more effective because Carroll Baker is so good as his wife ... she finds a whole new range. It may seem surprising to say that Baker holds the screen against Jack Nicholson, and yet she does".

=== 1988–2003: Later roles and retirement ===
In 1990, Baker played the role of Eleanor Crisp—described by Roger Ebert as "an effective bitch on wheels"—in Ivan Reitman's comedy Kindergarten Cop, starring Arnold Schwarzenegger, which she filmed in Astoria, Oregon, in the summer of 1990. The film was a huge financial success, grossing over $200 million worldwide. Her film and television work continued throughout the '90s, and she acted in many made-for-television movies, including the true-crime story Judgment Day: The John List Story (1993), Witness Run (1996), and Dalva (1996) with Farrah Fawcett.

In 1997, Baker was cast in a supporting role in David Fincher's thriller The Game, in which she plays a housekeeper to a billionaire San Francisco banker (played by Michael Douglas) who becomes embroiled in a sadistic game by his antagonistic brother, played by Sean Penn. In an interview with the New York Post following the film's release, Baker commented on her role, saying: "It's an important movie and I'm honored to be in it. Of course, I'd like to be the romantic lead, and I'm actually closer to Michael's [Douglas] age than Deborah Kara Unger is, [but] I think it's always worked that way in Hollywood. When I was in my 20s, I played opposite Jimmy Stewart, Robert Mitchum, and Clark Gable, all of whom were old enough to be my father." The Game proved to be a major success among Baker's later films, performing successfully at the box office and garnering widespread critical acclaim.

In addition to her work in big-budget productions, Baker also appeared in small, independent films, such as Just Your Luck (1996) and Nowhere to Go (1997). The 1990s also had Baker more frequently appearing on television series, including episodes of Grand (1990), Tales from the Crypt (1991, opposite Teri Garr in a segment directed by Michael J. Fox), Murder, She Wrote and L.A. Law (both 1993); Chicago Hope (1995), and Roswell (1999). In 2000, she appeared in the Lifetime film Another Woman's Husband. In 2002, Baker appeared in the documentary Cinerama Adventure, and guest-starred in an episode of The Lyon's Den, playing the mother of Rob Lowe's character. Her role in The Lyon's Den was Baker's last screen appearance before she formally retired from acting in 2003. Her acting career spanned 50 years, and more than 80 roles in film, television, and theater.

She has, however, sometimes participated in retrospective documentaries, including an interview for the 2006 DVD release of Baby Doll, which includes a documentary featuring Baker reflecting on the film's impact on her career. Baker has also been featured in documentaries about several of her co-stars, including Clark Gable, Roger Moore, Sal Mineo, and James Dean, including the 1975 James Dean: The First American Teenager, and a 1985 BBC Radio 2 tribute marking the 30th anniversary of the actor's death. Her memories of James Dean at the Actors Studio and later in Giant were recalled on BBC Radio 2 in 1982, when she guested on You're Tearing Me Apart, Terence Pettigrew's documentary which commemorated the 25th anniversary of Dean's death in a car accident in 1955. Also on the program were singer-actor Adam Faith and the screenwriter Ray Connolly.

== Writing ==
In 1983, Baker published an autobiography titled Baby Doll: An Autobiography, which detailed her life and career as an actress and revealed the issues with Paramount and Warner Bros. that had led her to move to Europe in the 1970s and pursue a career in Italian films. Baker said to Regis Philbin, when he interviewed her for Lifetime Television in 1986, that she "didn't want to write an autobiography ... but I wanted to write, and I knew that would be the easiest thing to get published." She further commented to Philbin on her writing, saying: "I think I always wanted to write, but I was a little self-conscious about it. I never had a formal education, and I've always had such a respect for writing. While I could go out and say, even before I started to act, 'Yes, I'm an actress,' I couldn't really say 'I'm a writer.'" In spite of Baker's misgivings, Baby Doll: An Autobiography was well received. She later wrote two other books, To Africa with Love (1986), detailing her time spent in Africa, and a novel titled A Roman Tale (1987).

== Personal life ==
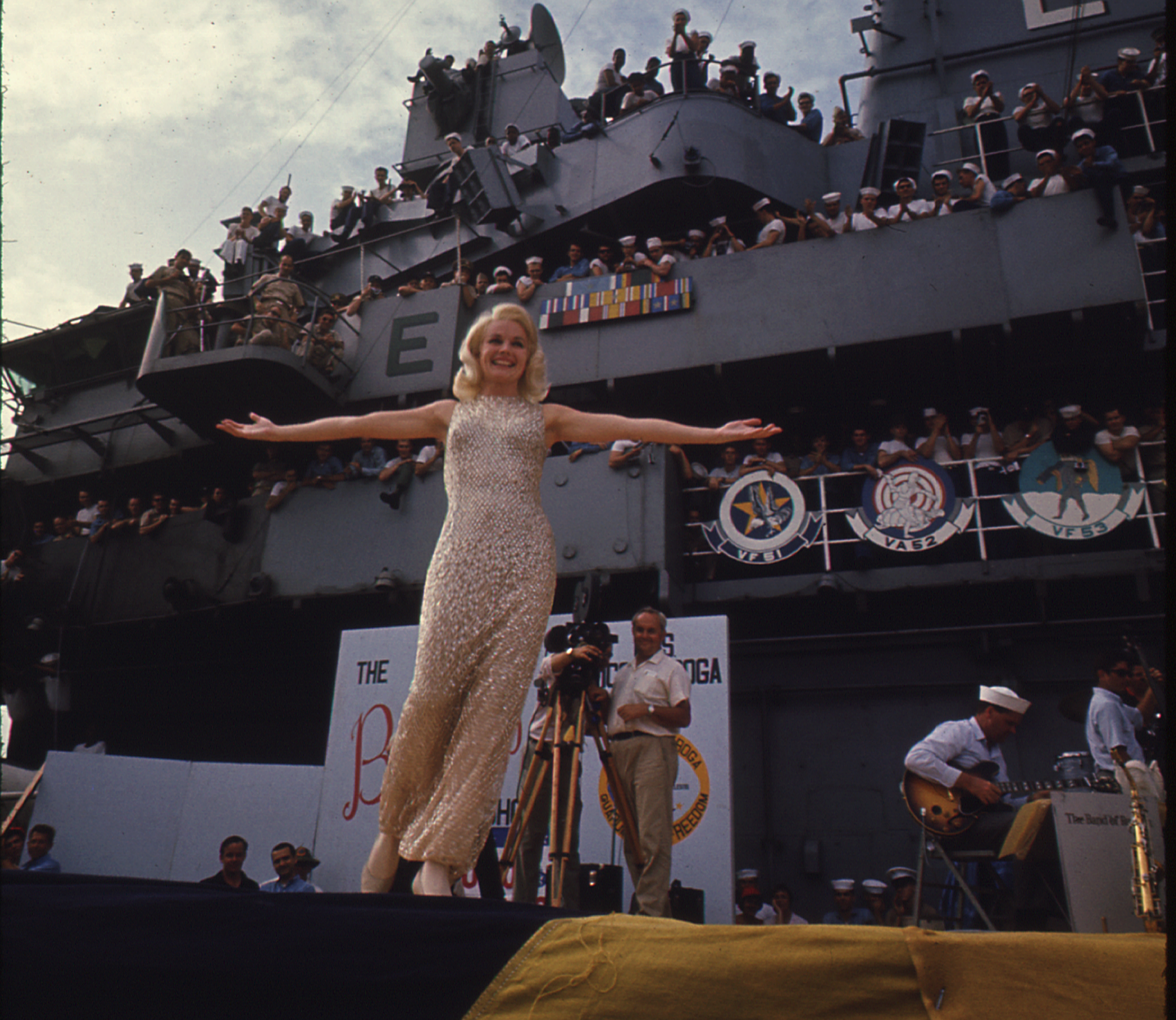
Baker entertaining the US soldiers fighting at the Vietnam War in 1965

Baker married three times. She first married 54-year-old Louie Ritter, owner of the Weylin Hotel, in 1953. The marriage ended within a year, after which she enrolled at the Actors Studio in New York City. Baker alleged that Ritter had raped her when she was still a virgin in the early stages of their relationship. On April 5, 1955, Baker married Jack Garfein, a Holocaust survivor she met at the Actors Studio and for whom she converted to Judaism (having been raised a Catholic). They had one daughter, Blanche Baker, born in 1956, who is also an actress, and a son, Herschel Garfein, born in 1958, who is a composer and faculty member at the Steinhardt School of Music at New York University. Garfein and Baker separated in 1964 and divorced in 1969. In an interview with Claudia Steinberg of Tank, Baker said of Garfein, "I treated [him] like a child. I did everything for him, and he didn't help at all when I worked so hard in Hollywood. He would go out to a very expensive lunch every day, often inviting somebody important, while I was sometimes too tired to eat.” Baker has four grandchildren through Blanche.

Baker married her third husband, British theater actor Donald Burton, on March 10, 1982, and resided in Hampstead, London, in the 1980s. The couple remained together until Burton's death from emphysema at their home in Cathedral City, California, on December 8, 2007.

After leaving Hollywood in the mid-1960s, Baker traveled with Bob Hope's Christmas USO troupe, entertaining soldiers in Vietnam and elsewhere in Southeast Asia, an experience she described as reformative: "In the hospitals I held the hands of damaged young men, and I realized that my pain was not exclusive: that in this world there was suffering much more terrible than mine."

Baker resided mainly in New York City and Los Angeles throughout the 1950s and 1960s, before relocating to Rome to pursue her career there. Baker was based mainly in Palm Springs, California, throughout the 1990s and early 2000s. As of 2016, she resided in New York City. In February 2014, she served as maid of honor at longtime friend, psychologist, and former actor Dr. Patrick Suraci's wedding to his partner, Tony Perkins, in New York.

== Legacy ==
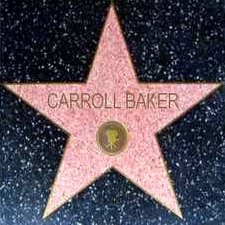
Baker's star on the Hollywood Walk of Fame at 1725 Vine Street

Baker's role in Baby Doll was one that would come to be career-defining, and her association with both the film and character remained consistent throughout her career. In a 1983 article by People magazine, "Baby Doll" was referred to as Baker's "middle name". The film, adapted originally from Tennessee Williams' one-act play 27 Wagons Full of Cotton, has been performed on stage into the 21st century: it had its theatrical debut in 2000, and has been performed numerous times since. Baker's performance of the role was credited in Vanity Fair as marking a significant cultural interest in the ingénue in American cinema.

In 2011, Baker attended the Tennessee Williams/New Orleans Literary Festival in celebration of Williams' centenary. There, she participated in a panel with Rex Reed, where she discussed her experiences with Williams and performing in Baby Doll. In 2011 and 2012, she was awarded Lifetime Achievement Awards from the Hoboken and Fort Lauderdale International Film Festivals.

A 1956 photograph by Diane Arbus depicts Baker onscreen in Baby Doll with a passing silhouette during a New York City theater screening of the film. She was also photographed by Andy Warhol in 1975 as part of his Polaroid portrait series, and is mentioned in his published diaries.

Baker has a star on the Hollywood Walk of Fame at 1725 Vine Street; her's was dedicated on February 8, 1960 and installed in spring 1961. In 2001, a Golden Palm Star on the Palm Springs Walk of Stars was also dedicated to her.

== Filmography and credits ==
Select filmography:

- Easy to Love (1953)
- Giant (1956)
- Baby Doll (1956)
- The Big Country (1958)
- But Not for Me (1959)
- The Miracle (1959)
- Bridge to the Sun (1961)
- Something Wild (1961)
- How the West Was Won (1962)
- Station Six-Sahara (1963)
- The Carpetbaggers (1964)
- Cheyenne Autumn (1964)
- Sylvia (1965)
- The Greatest Story Ever Told (1965)
- Mister Moses (1965)
- Harlow (1965)
- Her Harem (1967)
- Jack of Diamonds (1967)
- The Sweet Body of Deborah (1968)
- Orgasmo (1969)
- So Sweet...So Perverse (1969)
- A Quiet Place to Kill (1970)
- Captain Apache (1971)
- The Devil Has Seven Faces (1971)
- Knife of Ice (1972)
- Baba Yaga (1973)
- The Flower with the Petals of Steel (1973)
- Private Lessons (1975)
- Andy Warhol's Bad (1977)
- Cyclone (1978)
- The World Is Full of Married Men (1979)
- Star 80 (1983)
- Native Son (1986)
- Ironweed (1987)
- Kindergarten Cop (1990)
- Blonde Fist (1991)
- The Game (1997)

Select television credits:

- The Web (1954)
- Danger (1955)
- Thriller (1976)
- Grand (1990)
- Tales from the Crypt (1991)
- Murder, She Wrote (1993)
- L.A. Law (1993)
- Chicago Hope (1995)
- Roswell (1999)

Select stage credits:

- Escapade (1953)
- All Summer Long (1954)
- Arms and the Man (1958)
- Come on Strong (1962)
- Anna Christie (1966)
- Rain (1977)
- Lucy Crown (1979)
- Motive (1980)

== Publications ==
- Baby Doll: An Autobiography (Arbor House, 1983), ISBN 978-0-87795-558-0
- To Africa with Love (Dutton, 1986), ISBN 978-0-917657-54-2
- A Roman Tale (Dutton, 1986), ISBN 978-0-917657-53-5

== Awards and nominations ==
Year	Organization	Category	Work	Result	Ref.
1957	Academy Awards	Best Actress	Baby Doll	Nominated	
1957	BAFTA Awards	Best Foreign Actress	Baby Doll	Nominated	
1957	Golden Globe Awards	Best Actress in a Motion Picture – Drama	Baby Doll	Nominated	
1957	Golden Globe Awards	New Star of the Year – Actress	Baby Doll, Giant	Won	
1957	Hasty Pudding Theatricals	Woman of the Year	—N/a	Won	
1957	Look Magazine	Film Achievement Award	—N/a	Won	
1960	Hollywood Walk of Fame	Star - Motion Pictures	—N/a	Honored	
1965	Golden Laurel	Top Dramatic Performance, Female	The Carpetbaggers	2nd Place	
1996	Golden Boot Awards	—N/a	The Big Country, How the West Was Won, Cheyenne Autumn	Won	
1997	Breckenridge Film Festival	Lifetime Achievement Award	—N/a	Won	
2009	National Arts Club	Medal of Honor	—N/a	Honored	
2011	Hoboken International Film Festival	Lifetime Achievement Award	—N/a	Honored	
2012	Fort Lauderdale International Film Festival	Lifetime Achievement Award	—N/a	Honored	

== See also ==
- List of actors with Academy Award nominations
- List of actors with Hollywood Walk of Fame motion picture stars

== Works cited ==
- Baker, Carroll (1983). Baby Doll: An Autobiography. Arbor House. ISBN 978-0-87795-558-0.
- Cantarini, Martha Crawford; Spicer, Chrystopher J. (2010). Fall Girl: My Life as a Western Stunt Double. McFarland. ISBN 978-0-7864-4753-4.
- DiLeo, John (2010). Tennessee Williams and Company: His Essential Screen Actors. Hansen Publishing Group LLC. ISBN 978-1-601-82425-7.
- Haberski, Raymond (2007). Freedom to Offend: How New York Remade Movie Culture. The University Press of Kentucky. ISBN 978-0-8131-2429-2.
- Hamblett, Charles (1969). "Carroll Baker Fights the System". The Hollywood Cage. Hart Pub. Co. pp. 155–61.
- Harding, Les (2012). They Knew Marilyn Monroe: Famous Persons in the Life of the Hollywood Icon. McFarland. ISBN 978-0-786-49014-1.
- Horak, Jan-Christopher (2014). Saul Bass: Anatomy of Film Design. Screen Classics. The University Press of Kentucky. ISBN 978-0-8131-4718-5.
- Lisanti, Tom (2001). Fantasy Femmes of 60's Cinema: Interviews with 20 Actresses from Biker, Beach, and Elvis Movies. McFarland. ISBN 978-0-7864-0868-9.
- Matheson, Sue (2019). The John Ford Encyclopedia. Rowman & Littlefield. ISBN 978-1-538-10382-1.
- Mell, Eila (2005). Casting Might-Have-Beens: A Film by Film Directory of Actors Considered for Roles Given to Others. McFarland. ISBN 978-0-7864-2017-9.
- Monush, Barry (2003). Encyclopedia of Hollywood Film Actors, Vol. 1: From the Silent Era to 1965. Applause. ISBN 978-1-55783-551-2.
- Murphy, Brenda (1992). Tennessee Williams and Elia Kazan: A Collaboration in the Theatre. Cambridge University Press. ISBN 978-0-521-40095-4.
- Rathgeb, Douglas L. (2004). The Making of Rebel Without a Cause. McFarland. ISBN 978-0-7864-1976-0.
- Shipka, Danny (2011). Perverse Titillation: The Exploitation Cinema of Italy, Spain and France, 1960–1980. McFarland. ISBN 978-0-7864-4888-3.
- Steinberg, Cobbett (1980). Film Facts. New York: Facts on File, Inc. ISBN 0-87196-313-2.
- Vickers, Graham (2008). Chasing Lolita: How Popular Culture Corrupted Nabokov's Little Girl All Over Again. Chicago Review Press. ISBN 978-1-55652-682-4.
- Warhol, Andy (2014) [1989]. Hackett, Pat (ed.). The Andy Warhol Diaries. Grand Central Publishing. ISBN 978-0-446-39138-2.
