= Orgasmo =

1969 film by Umberto Lenzi

- Italian theatrical release poster
- Directed by: Umberto Lenzi
- Written by: Umberto Lenzi; Ugo Moretti; Marie Claire Sollenville
- Story by: Umberto Lenzi
- Produced by: Salvatore Alabiso
- Starring: Carroll Baker; Lou Castel; Colette Descombes; Tino Carraro
- Cinematography: Guglielmo Mancori
- Edited by: Enzo Alabiso
- Music by: Piero Umiliani
- Production companies: Tritone Filmindustria; Société Nouvelle de Cinématographie
- Distributed by: Titanus (Italy); SNC (France)
- Release dates: 7 February 1969 (Italy); 18 July 1972 (France)
- Running time: 90 minutes
- Countries: Italy; France
- Language: Italian

Orgasmo (Italian for "orgasm") is a 1969 giallo film co-written and directed by Umberto Lenzi and starring Carroll Baker, Lou Castel, and Colette Descombes. It follows a wealthy American socialite who finds herself preyed upon by two nefarious young siblings who indulge her with sex, drugs, and alcohol while she vacations at an Italian villa. This film helped launch the second phase of Baker's career, during which she became a regular star in Italian productions.

After its Italian premiere in February 1969, Orgasmo was released in the United States under the alternative title Paranoia later that same year. It was one of the first films to carry an X rating in the United States under the newly established Motion Picture Association film rating system, and this fact was sensationalized for its American promotional materials.

The film marked the first of four collaborations between Lenzi and actress Carroll Baker, who also starred in So Sweet... So Perverse (1969), A Quiet Place to Kill (1970) and Il coltello di ghiaccio (1972).

== Plot ==
American socialite Catherine West arrives in Italy from New York to a flurry of journalists following the car accident death of her husband Robert, a Texas oil baron who left her his $200 million estate. She retreats to an Italian villa rented by her austere lawyer, Brian Sanders. Catherine soon meets Peter Donovan, a young American man from Boston whose car has broken down nearby. Peter manages to manipulate his way into staying with Catherine, who is initially icy toward his romantic advances. However, Peter swiftly manages to seduce her, and the two engage in a passionate affair.

Catherine travels to London to visit with her late husband's relatives to discuss property she is bequeathing to them, but finds them to be abrasive and angry with her, believing she married Robert solely for his money. Late one night, Catherine senses someone has broken into the house, but the housekeeper Teresa attributes Catherine's paranoia to her abuse of alcohol and prescription drugs. When Catherine invites Peter to stay with her for a week, his sister Eva arrives at the villa unexpectedly. Catherine enjoys the siblings' companionship and youthful vivaciousness.

During a dinner meeting with Brian, Catherine admits she is suffering from liver failure due to her alcoholism. Upon returning to the villa, Catherine finds Peter and Eva in bed together nude. She presumes the two have engaged in incest, but Peter informs Catherine that he and Eva are not blood-related, and are in fact only stepsiblings. Eva confesses that she is sexually attracted to Catherine, and the three soon engage in a series of nightly debaucherous threesomes fueled by Peter and Eva's indulging of Catherine in liquor and stimulant drugs.

One night, Catherine, disgusted with herself and in a drunken rage, orders Peter and Eva to leave the villa. They oblige, but soon return, and begin physically abusing Catherine and taking control of the house, subduing Catherine by forcing her to drink. Finding herself held hostage by the siblings, Catherine becomes increasingly desperate to escape Peter and Eva. She manages to produce a gun, with which she shoots Peter. Catherine loses consciousness due to a sedative fed to her by Eva, and awakens to find that the gun was loaded with blanks by the siblings, and that Peter was unharmed. The two bind and gag Catherine, tying her to a bed. When Brian visits the villa, Peter tells him that Catherine has descended into a depression, and has threatened to commit suicide.

Locked in her upstairs bedroom, Catherine is further tormented by the siblings, who, on one occasion serve her a live toad for dinner. The two later bring her whiskey and a large number of barbiturates, along with a falsified letter stating Brian has died in a plane crash, with the hope that Catherine will voluntarily kill herself by overdosing. Catherine manages to escape her bedroom and flees to the attic, accessing the roof of the villa. Brian arrives, and witnesses Catherine collapse over the edge of the roof, falling to the veranda below and fracturing her skull. Brian picks the injured Catherine up in his arms. The two briefly make eye contact before he ruthlessly throws her over the veranda onto the driveway below, killing her. Brian, who has conspired with the siblings to steal Catherine's fortune, produces two forged suicide notes and orders Peter to alert authorities to Catherine's staged suicide. It is revealed that Brian is in fact Peter and Eva's uncle, and had Catherine unknowingly sign documents that bequeathed her estate to the trio.

After the reading of Catherine's last will and testament, Brian is met by a detective who notifies him that New York police discovered that the brakes in Robert's car were tampered with, causing his fatal road accident. Brian momentarily fears their plot has been discovered, until the detective states that police believe Catherine caused the accident, as Robert had planned to divorce her. Based on this conclusion, Catherine is not legally entitled to her husband's estate, which Brian is informed will instead go to his aunt. Meanwhile, as Peter and Eva gleefully drive through the city in their convertible, they are killed in a head-on collision with a truck.

== Cast ==
- Carroll Baker as Catherine West (Note: Some sources spell the character's name as "Kathryn", but newspaper clippings shown in the film spell it as "Catherine".)
- Lou Castel as Peter Donovan
- Colette Descombes as Eva Stuart
- Tino Carraro as Brian Sanders
- Lilla Brignone as Teresa
- Tina Lattanzi as Catherine's aunt
- Franco Pesce as Martino

== Analysis ==
Film scholar Robert Curti considers Orgasmo a variation on Pier Paolo Pasolini's Teorema (1968), another film in which "seductive strangers [disrupt] the bourgeois status quo and its morals". Curti also compares the film to the novella Carmilla (1872), about a young woman seduced by a lesbian vampire.

== Release ==
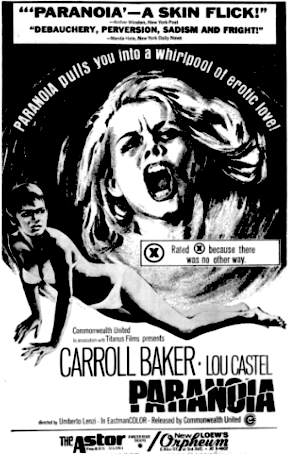
In the United States, the film's promotional materials sensationalized its X rating.

Orgasmo premiered in Italy on 7 February 1969. The Italian version of Orgasmo has a different ending than the American version. In the United States, Orgasmo opened under the Paranoia title on 13 August the same year. The film was among the first to receive an X rating in the United States under the newly-established Motion Picture Association film rating system, and its X rating was sensationalized in advertising materials.

The film's title has led to confusion due to its re-titling in the United States as Paranoia. Umberto Lenzi's next film (which also starred Carroll Baker) was released as Paranoia in Italy in 1970, but was retitled A Quiet Place to Kill for its American release.

Like other early giallo films, Orgasmo was not popular among Italian film audiences upon its initial theatrical release, as the genre never gained popularity in its home country until the release of Dario Argento's The Bird with the Crystal Plumage (1970) and The Cat o' Nine Tails (1971), but it was a major hit outside of Italy. Orgasmo was released in France as Une folle envie d'aimer (lit. 'A mad desire to love').

Baker commented in 1971 on the success of her Italian films:

My pictures in Italy have grossed so much money that I don't have to search the rest of the world for work. They build movies around me and the percentages are sensational... Orgasmo, which was called Paranoia in America, grossed $8 million there alone!

=== Critical reception ===
From contemporary reviews, the Monthly Film Bulletin wrote that "this high gloss melodrama rings enough changes on an old theme to keep one watching right up to the grisly retribution of the finale, even if the denouement is a trifle rushed". The review concluded that "it might have been even more enjoyable - on its own low camp level - if Umberto Lenzi had not been so determined to match style to subject, with the camera deliriously sliding in and out of focus as the tormented lady totters down the stairs and every scene shot from behind a bit of the furniture". Roger Ebert gave the film a negative review, stating that "only the haunting memory of Succubus prevents me from naming [Orgasmo] as the worst movie of the year".

From retrospective reviews, the online film database AllMovie gave Orgasmo one star, referring to it as less interesting than A Quiet Place to Kill and stating that "there are some interesting moments, but this is clearly the lesser of the two films". Troy Howarth reviewed Orgasmo favorably in So Deadly, So Perverse: 50 Years of Italian Giallo Films, writing that "the film is a classic example of the so-called sexy giallo, with plenty of cool eroticism and a pleasantly 'mod' aesthetic". Howarth added that director Lenzi "displays a sure and steady hand in gradually unveiling the various plot twists". In Sleazoid Express, Bill Landis wrote, "The photography seems filmed through a shot glass. The use of red lighting and off-kilter shots, while simple and inexpensive, are extremely effective in reproducing the state of being slowly overdosed on liquor and prescription pills." Landis continued, "Paranoia established director Umberto Lenzi as the king of giallos, an effective melodramatist who delivered the goods. Lenzi was sleazier and more bluntly sexual than more revered figures like Mario Bava and Dario Argento".

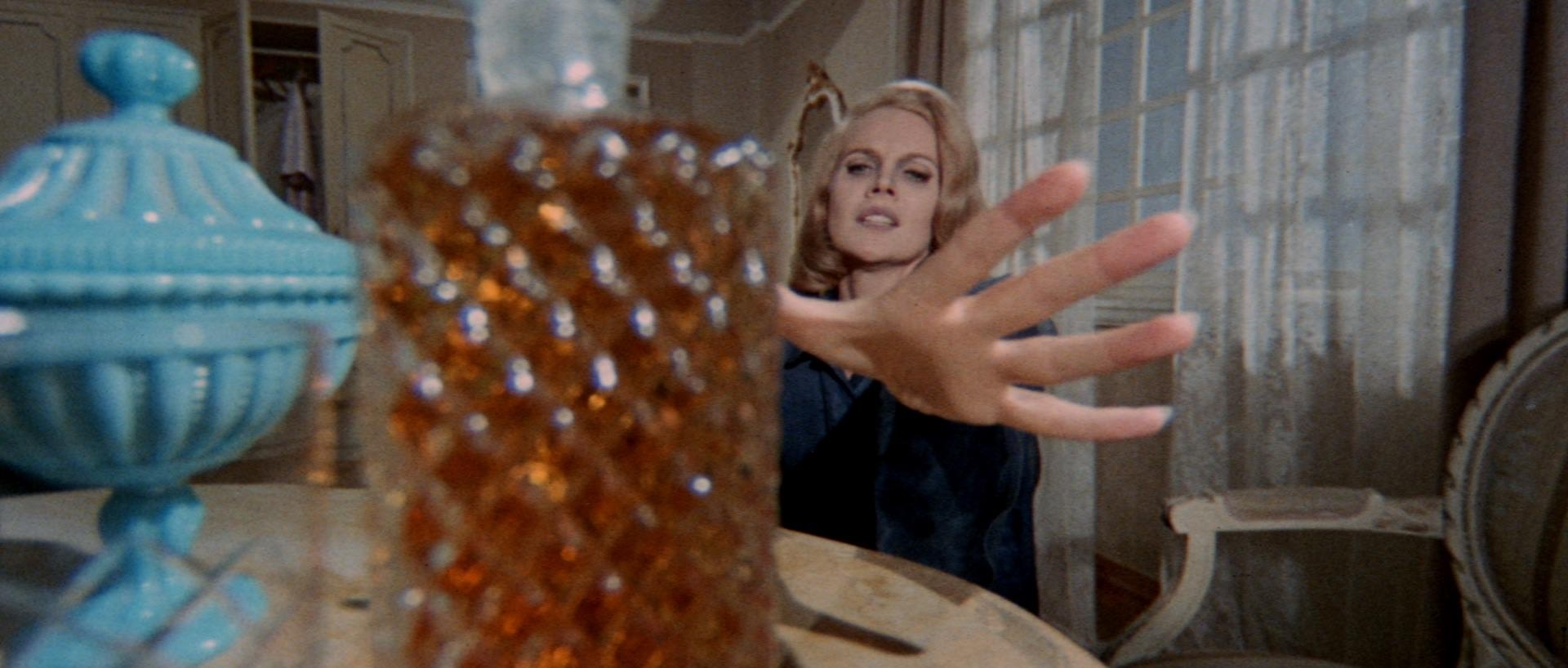
Orgasmo (1969) features a female protagonist (played by Carroll Baker) who becomes embroiled in a psychological, sexual conflict.

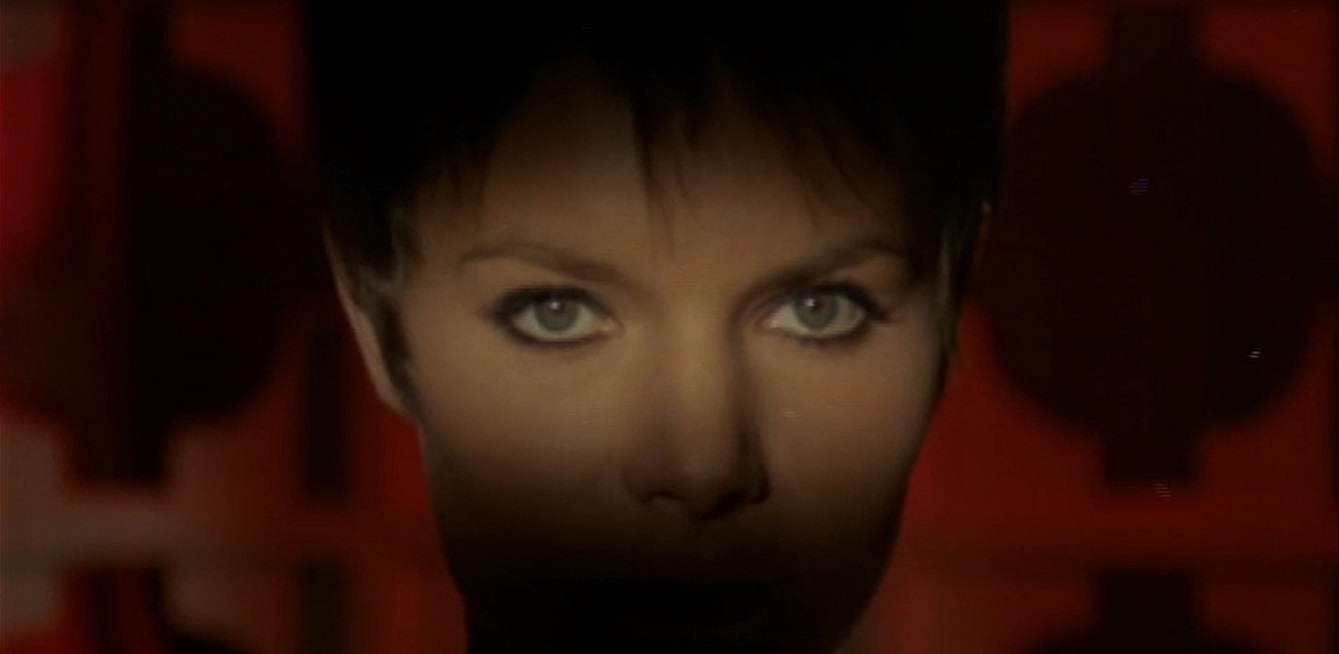
Colette Descombes in a psychedelic scene from Orgasmo (1969).

=== Home media ===
The X-rated U.S. cut of Paranoia was released on VHS in 1985, in pan and scan 4:3 aspect ratio, by Spotlite Video, a division of Republic Pictures Corporation.

The film was released on Blu-ray in a box set by Severin Films in June 2020, featuring all four of Lenzi's film collaborations with actress Carroll Baker (including So Sweet... So Perverse, A Quiet Place to Kill, and Il coltello di ghiaccio). The box set includes both versions of Orgasmo.

== See also ==
- List of thriller films of the 1960s
- List of French films of 1969
- List of Italian films of 1969

== Sources ==
- Brizio-Skov, Flavia (2011). Popular Italian Cinema: Culture and Politics in a Postwar Society. I.B.Tauris. ISBN 978-1-848-85572-4.
- Curti, Robert (2022). Italian Giallo in Film and Television: A Critical History. Jefferson, North Carolina: McFarland. ISBN 978-1-476-68248-8.
- Howarth, Troy (2011). So Deadly, So Perverse: 50 Years of Italian Giallo Films (Volume 1 1963-1973). Midnight Marquee Press. ISBN 978-1-936-16850-7.
- Landis, Bill; Clifford, Michelle (2002). Sleazoid Express: A Mind-Twisting Tour Through the Grindhouse Cinema of Times Square. Touchstone. ISBN 978-0-743-21583-1.
- Luther-Smith, Adrian (1999). Blood and Black Lace: The Definitive Guide to Italian Sex and Horror Movies. Stray Cat Publishing Ltd. ISBN 0-9533261-1-X.
- Muller, Eddie; Faris, Daniel (1996). Grindhouse: The Forbidden World of "Adults Only" Cinema. New York: St. Martin's Griffin. ISBN 978-0-312-14609-2.
- Shipka, Danny (2011). Perverse Titillation: The Exploitation Cinema of Italy, Spain and France, 1960–1980 (illustrated ed.). McFarland & Company. ISBN 978-0-786-44888-3.
- Lenzi, Umberto (1985). Paranoia. Spotlite Video.
