= As of Tomorrow =

1976 film directed by Franz Antel

As of Tomorrow (Original title: Ab morgen sind wir reich und ehrlich) is an Austrian-Italian-German gangster comedy film from 1976. Directed by Franz Antel, the film's main cast includes Arthur Kennedy, Curd Jürgens and Carroll Baker.

== Plot ==
Former gangster Michael "Mike" Jannacone lives what some might call a well-deserved retirement in his native village in the Abruzzi mountains. Once reputed as a powerful Mafia godfather in the United States, he now wishes to enjoy his old age in his old homeland of Italy.

He only managed to leave the U.S. because he had incriminating tapes of American politicians and could incriminate Senator Shelton, who is currently in the presidential election campaign. Stored in the safe of a bank in the neighboring town of Roccafreddo, the tapes are Jannacone's old age insurance.

Jannacone has written his memoirs, and intends to have what he considers his "great" life as a former kingpin filmed. However, he needs the necessary money for this costly project, and Senator Shelton is supposed to help him again. Various people try to get hold of the tapes – by fair means or foul.

== Production notes ==
Since Franz Antel was considering a career in Hollywood, he negotiated with an American distribution company in Rome and, after several weeks, came up with a 40-page contract for a film to be made. A clause in this contract stated that the film had to be shot originally in English. As of Tomorrow was filmed in Italy in 1975. The studio shots were taken in Cinecittà. Antel's business partner Carl Szokoll was in charge of manufacturing. The production companies involved came from Germany, Austria, Italy and Yugoslavia.

The premiere was held on April 2, 1976, in Campione d'Italia and the German premiere on June 17, 1977. However, since two roles had been dubbed, Antel was accused of breach of contract by his American distributor because the film was not shot entirely in the agreed language. The American premiere that Antel expected did not take place, which also dashed his hopes of a Hollywood career.

The film was also broadcast on television under the title The Mafia Sends Greetings.

== Reviews ==
"A confused and wild slapstick without any quality." – Lexicon of international film "Coppola's 'The Godfather' inspired Franz Antel to create a parody of mafia films. The result is one of his signature outfits. (...) Conclusion: This nonsense needs to be concreted in and sunk." – Cinema online
