= The Flower with the Petals of Steel =

1973 film by Gianfranco Piccioli

- Original title: Il fiore dai petali d'acciaio
- Directed by: Gianfranco Piccioli
- Written by: Gianni Martucci; Gianfranco Piccioli
- Starring: Carroll Baker
- Cinematography: Antonio Borghesi
- Music by: Marcello Giombini
- Release date: 1973
- Country: Italy
- Language: Italian

The Flower with the Petals of Steel (Italian: Il fiore dai petali d'acciaio, also known as The Flower with the Deadly Sting) is a 1973 Italian giallo film directed by Gianfranco Piccioli, starring Gianni Garko.

== Plot ==
A wealthy physician accidentally kills his mistress and ends up being blackmailed with photos of the crime.

== Cast ==
- Gianni Garko as Andrea Valenti
- Carroll Baker as Evelyn Graffi
- Paola Senatore as Daniela
- Ivano Staccioli as Inspector Garrano
- Umberto Raho as The Director
- Pilar Velázquez as Lena
