= Judgment Day: The John List Story =

- Genre: Crime; Drama
- Written by: Dennis Turner
- Directed by: Bobby Roth
- Starring: Robert Blake; Beverly D'Angelo; David Caruso; Carroll Baker
- Music by: Craig Safan
- Country of origin: United States
- Original language: English

Production
- Executive producers: Lisa Block; Chuck McLain
- Producer: Dan Howard
- Cinematography: Shelly Johnson
- Editor: Henk Van Eeghen
- Running time: 96 minutes
- Production companies: C.M. Two Production; Republic Pictures

Original release
- Network: CBS
- Release: February 23, 1993

Judgment Day: The John List Story is a 1993 American made-for-television crime drama film directed by Bobby Roth. It stars Robert Blake and Beverly D'Angelo. It was nominated for an Emmy Award in 1993.

== Plot ==
Depiction of a fictionalized version of the crime of John List, who killed his mother, wife, and three children in 1971, before assuming a new identity, and eluding capture for over 17 years.

== Cast ==
- Robert Blake as John List
- Beverly D'Angelo as Helen List
- David Caruso as Chief Bob Richland
- Carroll Baker as Alma List
- Melinda Dillon as Eleanor
- Alice Krige as Jean Syfert
- Roger Cross as Dennis
- Gabrielle Miller as Patricia List
