= Bridge to the Sun =

1961 film

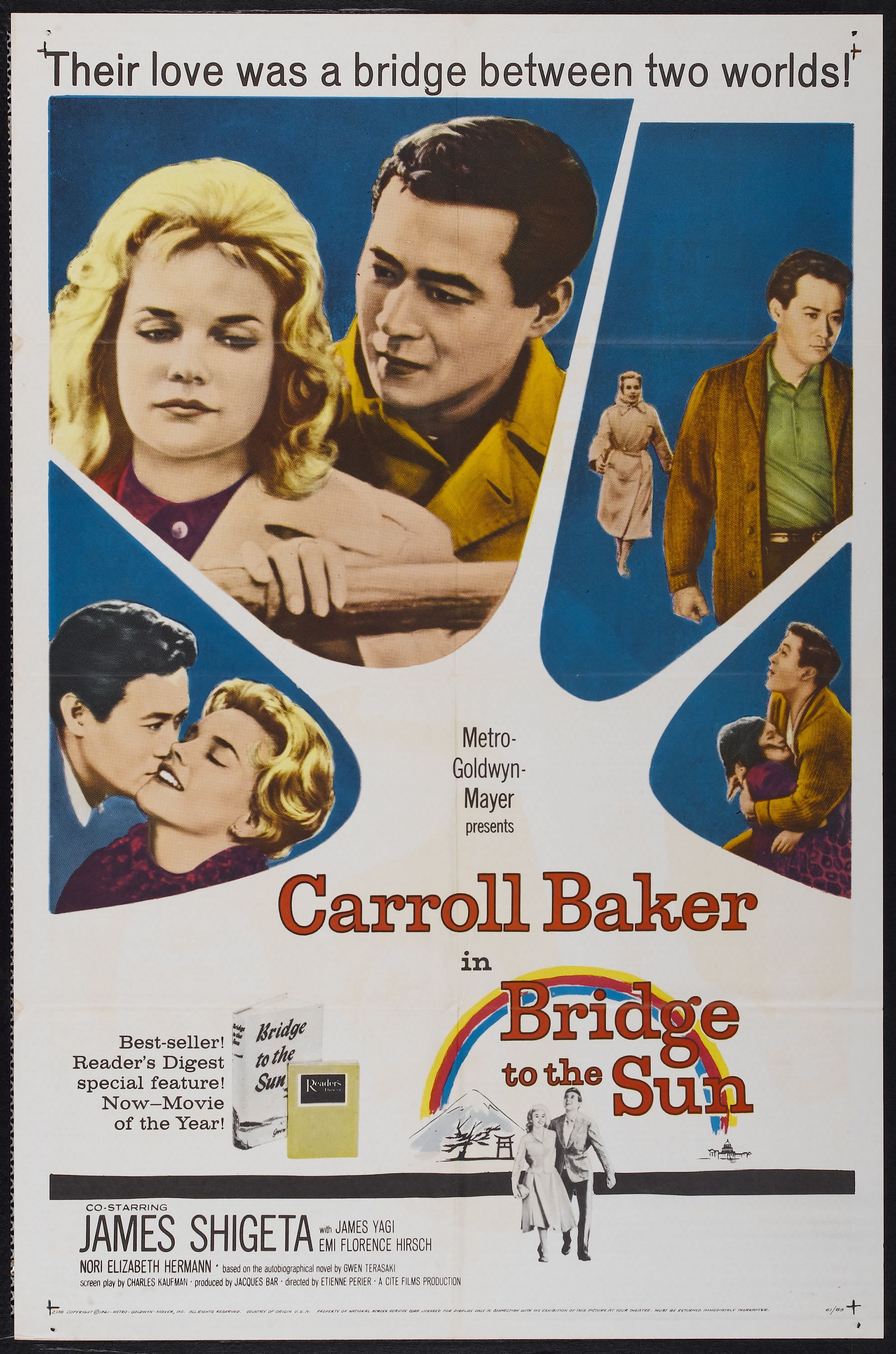
- Directed by: Etienne Périer
- Screenplay by: Charles Kaufman
- Based on: Bridge to the Sun; 1957 book by Gwendolen Terasaki
- Produced by: Jacques Bar
- Starring: Carroll Baker; James Shigeta; Tetsurō Tamba; Sean Garrison
- Cinematography: Bill Kelly; Seiichi Kizuka; Marcel Weiss
- Edited by: Robert Isnardon; Monique Isnardon
- Music by: Georges Auric
- Production company: Cite Films
- Distributed by: MGM
- Release date: August 31, 1961
- Running time: 113 minutes
- Countries: France; United States
- Language: English
- Budget: less than $100,000

Bridge to the Sun is a 1961 drama film directed by Etienne Périer and starring Carroll Baker, James Shigeta, James Yagi, Tetsurō Tamba and Sean Garrison. It is based on the 1957 autobiography Bridge to the Sun by Gwen Terasaki, which detailed events in Terasaki's life and marriage.

== Plot ==
Gwen Harold, an American woman from Tennessee, meets Hidenari Terasaki (called Terry by his friends and family), the secretary to the Japanese ambassador, while attending a reception at the Japanese embassy in Washington, D.C. They begin dating and quickly fall in love, and when Terry proposes marriage, she cheerily agrees. After hearing of the engagement, the Japanese ambassador attempts to dissuade Gwen, claiming that the marriage would hurt Terry's career. Gwen reluctantly tries to distance herself from Terry, but Terry defies the ambassador and the marriage takes place.

Terry is recalled to Japan and Gwen accompanies him. In Tokyo, Terry begins to treat Gwen much differently, expecting her to behave according to Japanese customs, many of which involve strict deference to men. However, Gwen bristles and defiantly expresses her feelings about the subservient role of women to Terry, but she continues to try to assimilate into the culture. She soon reveals that she is pregnant and gives birth to a daughter named Mako.

By November 1941, Terry has been reassigned to the American embassy and the family relocates to the U.S. Terry, who opposes violence, fails in a desperate measure to cable the president in order to preserve the peace. After the Japanese attack on Pearl Harbor, Terry is deported and Gwen decides to accompany him back to Japan despite the potential danger. While there, Gwen experiences fervent anti-American hatred. Terry attempts to be a mediator for peace, which places him at odds with prevailing sentiment. Soldiers raid the house and it is clear that the Terasakis will endure more hostility if they remain in Tokyo. They agree to stay at a friend's empty house outside of the city.

With Gwen and Mako in the country home, Terry returns to Tokyo. He offers to arrange her passage back to the U.S. where she will be safe, but she refuses, wanting to be close to her husband. As the war turns against Japan, food is scarce and Gwen's nerves are increasingly frayed as the violence of the war draws near. During an American air raid on the town, a young girl near Mako is killed, but Mako is unharmed. One day, the entire village gathers to listen to the emperor's radio address declaring the Japanese surrender.

With the war over, Terry urges Gwen to return to Tennessee to expose Mako to American life, but Gwen refuses to leave him. One day, she sees Terry, who has been ill, standing over his parents' graves. She senses that he knows he will die soon. She confirms the bad news with Terry's friend. Days later, after Gwen agrees to return to the U.S. with Mako, she embraces Terry at the dock, knowing that she will never see him again.

== Cast ==
- Carroll Baker as Gwen Terasaki
- James Shigeta as Hidenari Terasaki
- James Yagi as Hara
- Tetsurō Tamba as Jiro
- Sean Garrison as Fred Tyson
- Ruth Masters as Aunt Peggy
- Nori Elisabeth as Hermann
- Emi Florence Hirsch as Mako Terasaki, at different ages
- Hiroshi Tomono as Ishi

== Production ==
The book on which the film is based chronicles the life of Gwen Harold (1906–1990), an American from Tennessee who married Japanese diplomat Hidenari "Terry" Terasaki in 1937. He was first secretary at the Japanese embassy in Washington, D.C., in 1941 when Pearl Harbor was attacked, and was among the staff who translated the Japanese declaration of war and delivered it to the U.S. government. Before the Pearl Harbor attack, Terasaki had sent secret messages to Japanese pacifists seeking to avert war. The couple and their daughter Mariko were, along with all Axis diplomats, interned in 1942 and repatriated via neutral Angola later that year. Terasaki held various posts in the Japanese foreign affairs department until 1945, when he became an advisor to the emperor, and was the official liaison between the imperial palace and General Douglas MacArthur, the Supreme Allied Commander. Mariko and her mother left Japan in 1949 so that Mariko could attend East Tennessee State University in Johnson City, Tennessee. Terasaki died in 1951 in Japan at the age of 50.

Location filming began with three weeks in Washington, D.C. followed by six weeks near Kyoto, Japan in late 1960. Interior scenes were then filmed in Paris. While in France, Carroll Baker entertained American troops at a NATO base near Lyon.

Baker was reportedly paid $100,000 for her performance despite having received twice that amount for The Big Country in 1958.

== Reception ==
Bridge to the Sun premiered in Johnson City, Tennessee with Baker in attendance. It was then screened at the Venice Film Festival, where the audience gave Baker a standing ovation at the completion of the film.

In a contemporary review for The New York Times, critic Bosley Crowther wrote: "[T]he film, on the whole, lacks solid texture and the performance to compel belief in the authenticity of the characters and the genuineness of the drama in which they are involved. The screen play prepared by Charles Kaufman is rather flat and obvious, the direction of Etienne Perier is pedestrian and the acting of the principals is odd."

Reviewer Charles Stinson of the Los Angeles Times called the film "a romantic drama on the bittersweet side and very clearly designed for a feminine audience". He appraised the performance of the two leads: "Miss Baker, though effective in a number of scenes, could have deepened her over-all [sic] portrayal. James Shigeta, as the diplomat, is very good. Smooth, gentle, forceful when necessary, he presents us with a man of thoughtfulness and sensitivity. He could well be Hollywood's new Oriental leading man."
