= Dalva =

- Print advertisement
- Genre: Drama; Romance
- Based on: Dalva by Jim Harrison
- Teleplay by: Judith Paige Mitchell
- Directed by: Ken Cameron
- Starring: Farrah Fawcett; Carroll Baker
- Music by: Lee Holdridge
- Country of origin: United States
- Original language: English

Production
- Executive producers: Russell Goldsmith; Karen Mack
- Producer: Jacqueline Adler
- Cinematography: Tony Imi
- Editor: Jerrold L. Ludwig
- Running time: 96 minutes
- Production company: Goldsmith Entertainment Company

Original release
- Network: ABC
- Release: March 3, 1996

Dalva is a 1996 American made-for-television drama film starring Farrah Fawcett and Carroll Baker, based on the novel by Jim Harrison

Although Fawcett isn't the movie's only star, she is the only performer to be billed in the opening credits. However, on DVD and VHS home video packaging, Baker and Powers Boothe garner direct below-the-title billing.

== Plot ==
When Farrah Fawcett's Dalva, who is part Sioux Indian, was a teenager, she fell in love with Duane and became pregnant by him. She later learns that Duane is also her half-brother. Her grandfather forces her to give the baby up for adoption. Five years later, Dalva finds Duane. He tells Dalva that he is dying; he rides into the sea in the sunset and shoots himself. Sixteen years later, Dalva finds love with a friend of her father's named Sam (Powers Boothe) who encourages her to find her son. She finds her son, and Dalva finds true love in the arms of Sam.

== Cast ==
- Farrah Fawcett as Dalva Northridge
- Carroll Baker as Naomi
- Powers Boothe as Sam Creekmouth
- Jesse Borrego as Duane Stonehorse
- Shawn Cady as Young Dalva
- Peter Coyote as Michael
- Laurel Holloman as Karen
- Rod Steiger as John Wesley Northridge II
