= So Sweet... So Perverse =

So Sweet...So Perverse
- Italian theatrical release poster
- Directed by: Umberto Lenzi
- Screenplay by: Ernesto Gastaldi
- Produced by: Jacuqes-Paul Bertrand; Mino Loy; Luciano Martino
- Starring: Carroll Baker; Jean-Louis Trintignant; Erika Blanc; Horst Frank
- Cinematography: Guglielmo Mancori
- Edited by: Eugenio Alabiso
- Music by: Riz Ortolani
- Production companies: Zenith Cinematografica; Flora Film; Tritone Filmindustria Roma S.r.l.; CEDIC; Rapid Film GmbH
- Distributed by: Variety Distribution
- Release dates: 31 October 1969 (Italy); 26 February 1971 (France)
- Running time: 92 minutes
- Countries: Italy; France; West Germany
- Language: Italian

So Sweet... So Perverse (Italian: Così dolce... così perversa) is a 1969 giallo film directed by Umberto Lenzi and written by Ernesto Gastaldi, starring Carroll Baker and Jean-Louis Trintignant. Set in Paris, it tells the story of a wife who plots to get rid of a rich and errant husband but is herself the victim of her accomplices.

== Plot ==
Jean, a wealthy industrialist in Paris, has married Danielle, but she now refuses him. In revenge, he lets himself be seduced by the host's wife at a party. Closer to home, an attractive woman moves into the flat above them, and they sometimes hear an abusive lover rebuke and beat her. Jean combines chivalry and desire by offering to protect her, and soon they are lovers. She is Nicole, and her violent ex is Klaus. She warns him that Klaus will seek to kill him, which happens during a fight. His charred body shows up in a burnt-out car.

Nicole, who in fact is Danielle's lover and accomplice, announces that Jean had given her his share in his company. Danielle begins to be haunted by guilt and, while she is on the phone with Nicole, Klaus creeps in and shoots her dead. In the absence of any better explanation, the police inspector reluctantly accepts suicide. Now rich and no longer at risk of exposure by Danielle, who had hired them, Nicole and Klaus get on a plane for Brazil. Two seats behind them is the police inspector.

== Cast ==
- Carroll Baker as Nicole Perrier
- Jean-Louis Trintignant as Jean Reynaud
- Erika Blanc as Danielle Reynaud
- Horst Frank as Klaus
- Helga Liné as Hélène Valmont
- Beryl Cunningham as A Stripper

== Production ==
Following the release of Orgasmo, director Umberto Lenzi and actress Carroll Baker worked again on another giallo film. The script by Ernesto Gastaldi borrows plot elements from Henri-Georges Clouzot's film Les Diaboliques (1955) and like many gialli of the era, revels in its portrayal of badly-behaved, wealthy protagonists.

Riz Ortolani provided the music score, which includes a ballad called Why? sung by J. Vincent Edward. It would be later re-used in Lenzi's film Seven Bloodstained Orchids.

== Release ==
So Sweet...So Perverse was released in Italy on October 31, 1969, and in France on February 26, 1971.
