= Her Harem =

- Directed by: Marco Ferreri
- Written by: Rafael Azcona; Marco Ferreri; Ugo Moretti
- Produced by: Henryk Chroscicki; Alfonso Sansone
- Starring: Carroll Baker; Gastone Moschin; Renato Salvatori.
- Cinematography: Luigi Kuveiller
- Edited by: Enzo Micarelli
- Music by: Ennio Morricone
- Production companies: Alexandra Produzioni Cinematografiche; Sancro International Film; Paris-Cannes Productions
- Distributed by: CIDIF
- Release date: 10 September 1967
- Running time: 96 minutes
- Country: Italy
- Language: Italian

Her Harem (Italian: L'harem, released in UK as The Harem) is a 1967 Italian comedy-drama film written and directed by Marco Ferreri and starring Carroll Baker, Gastone Moschin and Renato Salvatori.

== Plot ==
A woman has a number of male lovers so, during a holiday in Dubrovnik, she puts them together, with a stratagem, in her villa, in a sort of reverse harem.

== Cast ==
- Carroll Baker as Margherita
- Gastone Moschin as Gianni
- Renato Salvatori as Gaetano
- William Berger as Mike
- Michel Le Royer as René
- Clotilde Sakaroff as Gaetano's mother
- Ugo Tognazzi as himself

== Production ==
It was the first film Baker made in Europe. She was having difficulties in her career in Hollywood and was offered the role when she met the director at the Venice Film Festival.

Baker says the film was meant to be a comedy but the director "lost his courage at the last minute... it would have been wonderful as a comedy but he cut out all the funny scenes and put a serious ending on it."

== Reception ==
The film was a box office flop –"Harem just didn't work out," Baker later said, "those things happen." However it launched a successful career for Baker in Europe.
