= Mister Moses =

1965 American film by Ronald Neame

- Original film poster
- Directed by: Ronald Neame
- Written by: Charles Beaumont; Monja Danischewsky
- Based on: Mister Moses by Max Catto
- Produced by: Frank Ross
- Starring: Robert Mitchum; Carroll Baker
- Cinematography: Oswald Morris
- Edited by: Philip W. Anderson
- Music by: John Barry
- Distributed by: United Artists
- Release date: May 12, 1965
- Running time: 113 minutes (US); 117 minutes (UK)
- Country: United States
- Language: English
- Box office: $1,250,000

Mister Moses is a 1965 American adventure film directed by Ronald Neame and starring Robert Mitchum and Carroll Baker. It was written by Charles Beaumont and Monja Danischewsky based on the 1961 novel of the same name by Max Catto. It was filmed on location in Kenya, at Lake Naivasha and the Amboseli National Park. A con man is blackmailed into persuading an entire African village into relocating for their own safety.

== Plot ==
Beaten and expelled by African villagers for trying to cheat them, the unconscious Joe Moses drifts down a river, where he is discovered by the natives of another village. This tribe is being pressured to move by the District Officer, as their land will be flooded by the release of waters from a dam; but they refuse to leave their homes. Deeply Christian, the villagers compare Joe Moses to the real Moses due to his discovery in the reeds as was the baby Moses. With a broken leg and no money, Joe Moses is trapped in the village.

Nursed to health by missionary Rev. Anderson and his daughter Julie, Moses impresses the natives with his medicine show. He further astounds the locals when he discovers Emily, that he recognizes as an Indian elephant, in the village. Moses gets her to respond to commands in Hindustani, a language he acquired through his army service in the China Burma India theatre.

The Chief agrees to allow his people to move, but only if they are led by Moses. Reverend Anderson and Julie blackmail Moses through their knowledge of his diamond smuggling in order to lead the people to the "Promised Land". Seeing through Moses's confidence tricks is an educated African, Ubi. Ubi initially wishes to team up with Moses to con other Africans, but then attempts to steal Moses's show with a concealed flame thrower that has unexpectedly disastrous consequences.

Leading the villagers from atop his elephant, Moses takes them on a journey that has many parallels with the biblical trek, including a bit where he has to part the waters by entering the dam.

== Cast ==
- Robert Mitchum as Joe Moses
- Carroll Baker as Julie Anderson
- Ian Bannen as Robert
- Alexander Knox as Rev. Anderson
- Raymond St. Jacques as Ubi
- Orlando Martins as Chief
- Reginald Beckwith as Parkhurst

== Production ==
Max Catto's novel was published in 1961. Film rights were purchased that year by Frank Ross for $310,000. Ross announced he would make it for United Artists at a budget of $6.5 million. It was the seventh time Catto had sold a novel to the movies.

== Reception ==
The New York Times reviewer A. H. Weiler was unimpressed, writing that it "strains credibility and rarely excites a viewer."

== See also ==
- List of American films of 1965
