= A Quiet Place to Kill =

1970 film by Umberto Lenzi

- Italian theatrical release poster
- Directed by: Umberto Lenzi
- Screenplay by: Rafael Romero Marchent; Marcello Coscia; Bruno di Geronimo
- Story by: Rafael Romero Marchent; Marcello Coscia
- Starring: Carroll Baker; Jean Sorel; Marina Coffa; Anna Proclemer
- Cinematography: Guglie Imo Mancori
- Edited by: Antonio Ramirez; Enzo Alabiso
- Music by: Gregorio García Segura
- Production companies: Tritone Filmindustria; Medusa Cinematografica; D.I.A.
- Release date: February 20, 1970 (Italy)
- Running time: 94 minutes
- Countries: Italy; Spain

A Quiet Place to Kill (Italian: Paranoia) is a 1970 giallo film directed by Umberto Lenzi.

== Plot ==
Helen, a racecar driver whose personal and professional life is rapidly declining, is invited by her ex-husband Maurice's new wife Constance to stay at their plush estate. The two women form a bond, and it is not long before their mutual dislike for the husband culminates into a plan to kill him. Their plot to murder Maurice on a sailing trip goes awry, and Constance accidentally gets killed instead. Helen and her ex seize the moment and dispose of Constance's corpse at sea, but when the dead woman's daughter Susan arrives, the young lady suspects that they have murdered her mother.

== Cast ==
- Carroll Baker as Helene
- Jean Sorel as Maurice Sauvage
- Luis Dávila as Albert Duchamps
- Alberto Dalbés as Dr. Harry Webb
- Marina Coffa as Mrs. Susan
- Anna Proclemer as Constance Sauvage
- Lisa Halvorsen as Solange
- Hugo Blanco
- Jacques Stany

== Release ==
The film was released in Italy on February 20, 1970 under the title Paranoia.

The film was released internationally in 1973 as A Quiet Place to Kill, since Lenzi's previous 1969 film Orgasmo (1969) had already been released internationally as Paranoia. It was released in Spain as Una droga llamada Helen (lit. "A Drug Named Helen").

== Reception ==
The Monthly Film Bulletin described the film as "both sluggish and scrappy, with Lenzi bravely throwing up a screen of object-fixated camerawork and fidgety focusing, but not receiving much help from his players".
