= Alessandro Alessandroni =

Italian musician and composer

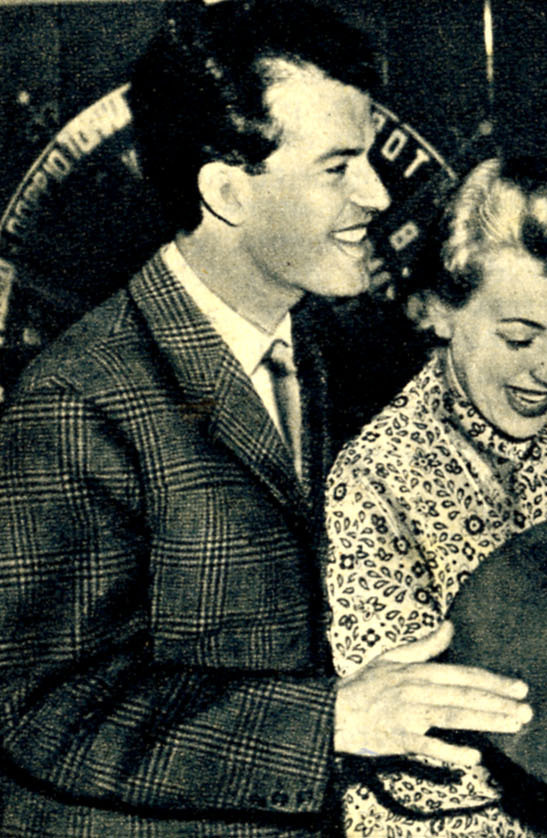
- Pictured next to Nora Orlandi (1955)

Background information
- Born: 18 March 1925; Rome, Kingdom of Italy
- Died: 26 March 2017 (aged 92) Swakopmund, Namibia
- Genre: Film score
- Occupations: Musician, composer
- Instruments: Guitar, mandolin, sitar, accordion, piano, whistling, mandolincello
- Years active: 1936–2017

Alessandro Alessandroni (18 March 1925 – 26 March 2017) was an Italian musician and composer. He played multiple instruments, including the guitar, mandolin, mandolincello, sitar, accordion and piano, composed more than 40 film scores and countless library music tracks, and was renowned for his whistling technique.

== Biography ==
Alessandroni collaborated with his childhood friend Ennio Morricone on a number of soundtracks for Spaghetti Westerns. Morricone's orchestration often calls for an unusual combination of instruments, voices, and whistling. Alessandroni's twangy guitar riff is central to the main theme for The Good, the Bad and the Ugly. Alessandroni can be heard as the whistler on the soundtracks for Sergio Leone's films, including the Dollars Trilogy, Once Upon a Time in the West, and Pervirella. He also collaborated with Morricone in scoring the 1974 film Around the World with Peynet's Lovers.

Alessandroni founded the octet vocal group I Cantori Moderni (English: The Modern Choristers) in 1961. The group, which included his wife, Giulia De Mutiis, performed wordless vocals on several Italian movie soundtracks. Most notably, I Cantori Moderni are featured on the song "Mah Nà Mah Nà", written by Piero Umiliani for the 1968 Luigi Scattini mondo film Sweden: Heaven and Hell (Italian: Svezia, inferno e paradiso) and popularized on The Muppet Show. Alessandroni also founded the rock band Braen's Machine with Piero Umiliani.

Alessandro has also composed film scores, including The Reward's Yours... The Man's Mine (1969), Lady Frankenstein (1971), The Devil's Nightmare (1971), The Mad Butcher (1971), Seven Hours of Violence (1973), Sinbad and the Caliph of Baghdad (1973), Poker in Bed (1974), White Fang and the Hunter (1975), Blood and Bullets (1976), L'adolescente (1976), La professoressa di scienze naturali (1976), The Opening of Misty Beethoven (1976), Women's Camp 119 (1977), Killer Nun (1978), L'imbranato (1979), and Trinity Goes East (1998).
