= Zeudi Araya =

Eritrean-Italian actress (1951–2026)

- ዘውዲ ኣርኣያ
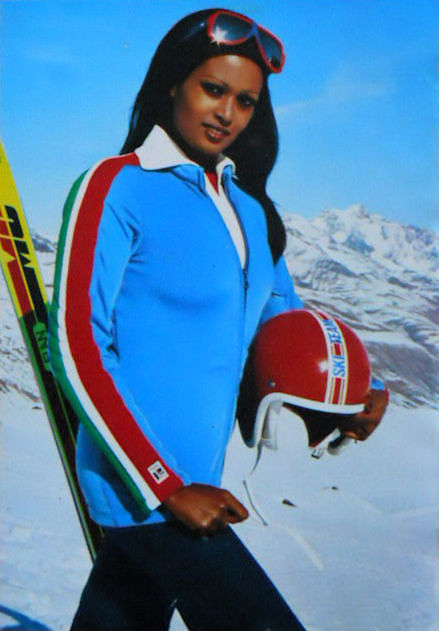
- Araya in 1975
- Born: 10 February 1951; Dekemhare, British Military Administration in Eritrea
- Died: 24 May 2026 (aged 75); Rome, Italy
- Spouse: Franco Cristaldi (m. 1983; died 1992)
- Partner(s): Massimo Spano (1994–2026)
- Children: Michelangelo Spano

Zeudi Araya (10 February 1951 – 24 May 2026) was an Eritrean actress, singer, model, and film producer who became a naturalized Italian.

== Early life and career ==
Zeudi Araya was born in Dekemhare. The daughter of a local politician and the niece of a diplomat who also served as Ambassador in Italy, in 1969 Araya won the Miss Ethiopia contest and subsequently started a modeling career. In 1972, Araya shot a commercial for the coffee brand Tazza D'Oro, and was noted by director Luigi Scattini, who cast her with Beba Lončar in La ragazza dalla pelle di luna shot in the Seychelles. In 1973, she made her singing debut recording two songs composed by Piero Umiliani for the score of another Scattini film, The Off-Road Girl. From 1973 to 1975, she starred in several films produced by P.A.C., then following her love story with film producer Franco Cristaldi in 1976 she became an exclusive actress for Cristaldi's production company Vides, starring in several high-profile comedies.

Araya's last prominent appearances were in the epic Hearts and Armour (1983) and in Giuliano Montaldo's all-star sci-fi thriller Control. Araya subsequently withdrew from acting to work as a producer. In 1995 she produced Massimo Spano's film Marciando nel Buio. In 1999 she produced a documentary on her husband, Franco Cristaldi e il suo cinema Paradiso.

== Personal life and death ==
Araya was married to film producer Franco Cristaldi from 1983 until his death in 1992. From 1994 she lived with the director Massimo Spano, with whom she had a son called Michelangelo.

Araya died in Rome on 24 May 2026, at the age of 75, following a long illness.

== Selected filmography ==
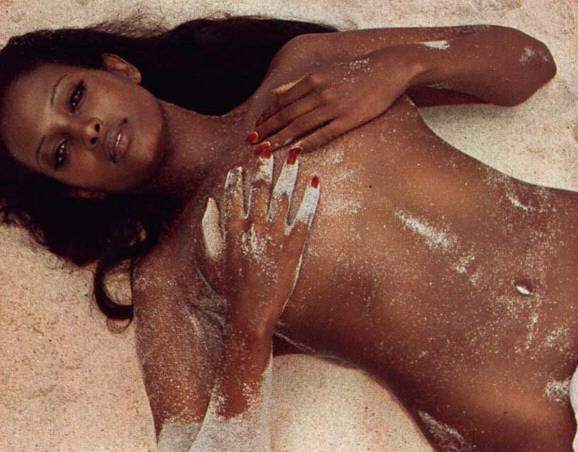
Araya in La ragazza dalla pelle di luna (1973)

- La ragazza dalla pelle di luna – "Simone" (1973)
- The Off-Road Girl – "Maryam" (1973)
- The Prey – "Nagaina" (1974)
- The Body – "Simoa" (1974)
- The Sinner – "Debra" (1975)
- Mr. Robinson – "Venerdì" (1976)
- Neapolitan Mystery – "Elizabeth" (1978)
- Tesoro mio – "Tesoro Hoaua" (1979)
- Atrocious Tales of Love and Death – "Elizabeth Hover" (1979)
- Hearts and Armour – "Marfisa" (1983)
- Control – "Sheba" (1987)

== Producer ==
- Marching in Darkness -"Zeudi Araya Cristaldi" (1996)
- Franco Cristaldi e il suo cinema Paradiso (2009)

== Discography ==
- Oltre l'acqua del fiume/Maryam (Bla Bla, BBR 1338, 7") (1973)
