= Bladestorm =

Bladestorm may refer to:

- Bladestorm: The Hundred Years' War, a video game
- 1987 Mogul Communications retitling of the 1966 film Knives of the Avenger
