= Mah Nà Mah Nà =

- German release picture sleeve

Single by Piero Umiliani

from the album Svezia, inferno e paradiso
- B-side: "You Tried to Warn Me"
- Released: 1968
- Genre: television theme music; pop; comedy music
- Label: Ariel AR-500 (US); Columbia AR-500 (Canada)
- Songwriter: Piero Umiliani

"Mah Nà Mah Nà" is a popular song by the Italian composer Piero Umiliani. It originally appeared in the Italian film Sweden: Heaven and Hell (Svezia, inferno e paradiso). On its own it was a minor radio hit in the United States and in Britain, but it became better known internationally after it was used by the Muppets and on The Benny Hill Show.

Sesame Street producer Joan Ganz Cooney heard the track on the radio and decided it would be a perfect addition to the show. The song's first Sesame Street performance by the Muppets was performed by puppeteers Jim Henson, Frank Oz and Loretta Long (Susan) on the fourteenth episode of the show, broadcast on November 27, 1969. The following Sunday, Henson and his Muppets performed the song on The Ed Sullivan Show. Seven years later, the song was part of the premiere episode of The Muppet Show.

Starting in 1971, The Benny Hill Show—in its second incarnation at Thames Television where it launched in 1969 in colour—included "Mah Nà Mah Nà" as part of a background music medley during their frequent slapstick sketches. The medley became a Benny Hill Show tradition for the rest of its run.

== Original version ==
Although Umiliani used a very similar theme in 1966 for the soundtrack of the Italian film Ring Around the World, "Mah Nà Mah Nà" debuted as part of Umiliani's soundtrack for the Italian mondo film Sweden: Heaven and Hell (1968), an exploitation documentary film about wild sexual activity and other behaviour in Sweden. The song accompanied a scene in the film set in a sauna which gave its original title "Viva la Sauna Svedese" ("Hooray for the Swedish Sauna"). It was performed by a band called Marc 4 (four session musicians from the RAI orchestra), and the lead part was sung by Italian singer/composer Alessandro Alessandroni and his wife Giulia. The song also appeared on the 1968 U.S. soundtrack album released for the film.

"Mah Nà Mah Nà" was a hit in many countries in 1968–1969. In the United States, it peaked at No. 55 in the Billboard Hot 100 singles chart and No. 44 on the Cash Box magazine chart in October 1969. It also reached No. 12 on the United States Adult Contemporary chart. In Canada, the song reached No. 22 in the RPM magazine top singles charts, October 11, 1969, and No. 5 on the AC Chart a week later. The original UK single release, on the Pye International label (7N 25499), left the artists name uncredited on the label, and a cover version by Giorgio Moroder, pseudonymously credited to "The Great Unknowns" and released the same year on the Major Minor label (MM 658), featured Moroder's "Doo-be-doo-be-do" on the B side (also sometimes featured in The Benny Hill Show). Umiliani's original version, now credited to Umiliani on the label, was reissued by EMI Records in the UK in 1977 and reached No. 8 in the charts. During its 1–15 September 1969 run on the WLS 890 Hit Parade, the surveys erroneously credited the record to someone named Pete Howard. WPTR did much the same, except that the credit was given to the station's disc jockey, J. W. Wagner.

== Chart history ==
Chart (1968–69)	Peak position
Canada RPM Top Singles	22
Canada RPM Adult Contemporary	5
U.S. Billboard Hot 100	55
U.S. Billboard Adult Contemporary	12
U.S. Cash Box Top 100	44

Chart (1977)	Peak position
Australia (Kent Music Report)	26
UK	8

== Other famous versions ==
A heavy metal version was recorded by the UK band Skin in 1996, for the "Perfect Day" single which was a minor hit in the UK at No. 33. This version is titled "The Muppet Song (Mah Na Mah Na)".

In 2011, the alternative rock band the Fray released a cover of the song on Muppets: The Green Album, though a remaster of the original version from The Muppet Show performance appears on the soundtrack from the 2011 film The Muppets.

In 2002 the alternative rock band Cake recorded a version for the VH1 charity album For the Kids, which later appeared on their 2007 compilation album B-Sides and Rarities.

The Mexican rock band Maná sang the song on Jimmy Kimmel Live! in 2016.

== Versions by the Muppets ==
Aside from its notoriety as the primary silent comedy sketch scene music for The Benny Hill Show, "Mahna Mahna" became familiar to many from its renditions by the Muppets on television. In 1969, the first season of Sesame Street featured a sketch featuring two Muppet girls voiced by Frank Oz and Loretta Long who are unsure of what to do, until they decide to sing a song. A short, shaggy-haired male Muppet character enters, and begins singing "Mahna Mahna", prompting the girls to join him. The male Muppet who led the "Mahna Mahna" call-and-response was referred to as simply "Mah Na Mah Na" or "Mahna Mahna" in scripts and most Sesame Street and The Muppet Show albums, though he was named "Bip Bippadotta" (ref. Kip Addotta) on the 1979 album Every Body's Record. The character was originally performed by Muppets creator Jim Henson, and has performed by Muppeteer veteran Bill Barretta since 2005.

On 30 November 1969, "Mahna Mahna" was performed on The Ed Sullivan Show by three new and more fully detailed Muppet characters. The male Muppet character was purple with wild, orange hair and a furry, green tunic, while the female Muppet characters were two identical pink cow-like alien creatures with horns and cone-like mouths (with yellow lips) that always remained open. The female characters – now called the Snowths (originally spelled "Snouths", as a portmanteau of "snout" and "mouth" since their mouth also served as their noses), both performed by Muppeteer veteran Frank Oz – would shake their heads in apparent disapproval whenever the male character began singing the scat portion of the song. The song "Mahna Mahna" was played at a slower tempo and given a more playful, quintessential "children's"-style arrangement as opposed to the previous arrangement which was slightly reminiscent of early 1960s calypso music.

In 1976, on the first episode of The Muppet Show to be recorded (featuring Juliet Prowse), the 1969 "Mahna Mahna" routine from The Ed Sullivan Show was reworked and used as the first sketch with the same characters and a new recording of the last musical arrangement. The Muppet Show became an immediate hit and "Mahna Mahna" was the highlight of that episode. During the sketch, Mahna Mahna managed to dance his way backstage and out of the Muppet Theater, phoning the Snowths to sing the title lyrics one last time and end the song. At the end of the episode, he managed to enter Statler and Waldorf's box.

As a result, the original Piero Umiliani recording finally became a hit in the UK (#8 in the UK charts in May 1977), where the Muppet Show soundtrack album featuring the Muppets' version went to number one. It was at that point that the name "Mahna Mahna and The Snouths" was given the incorrect credit of "Mahna Mahna and The Snowths", which has served as the definitive spelling ever since then. The single from the album, "Halfway Down the Stairs", reached the top Ten in the UK charts – and its B side was "Mah Na Mah Na" – making the song appear three times in the charts at the same time, albeit as a B side, the Piero Umiliani version and also a track on the album.

The song is performed in the 2011 feature film The Muppets, in which various celebrities sing with the Snowths in the end credits.

The song was also featured in the Muppets' live performances at the Hollywood Bowl and the O2 arena in 2017 and 2018 respectively. In the London performances, the Muppets were joined by Kylie Minogue, music group Steps and Bobby Moynihan.

== Commercially licensed versions ==
In 2017, the song served as the soundtrack for a Ford Explorer commercial, "For What Matters Most," in which a father and daughter make repeated trips to a hardware store while building a "Pinewood derby" car.
