= Piero Umiliani =

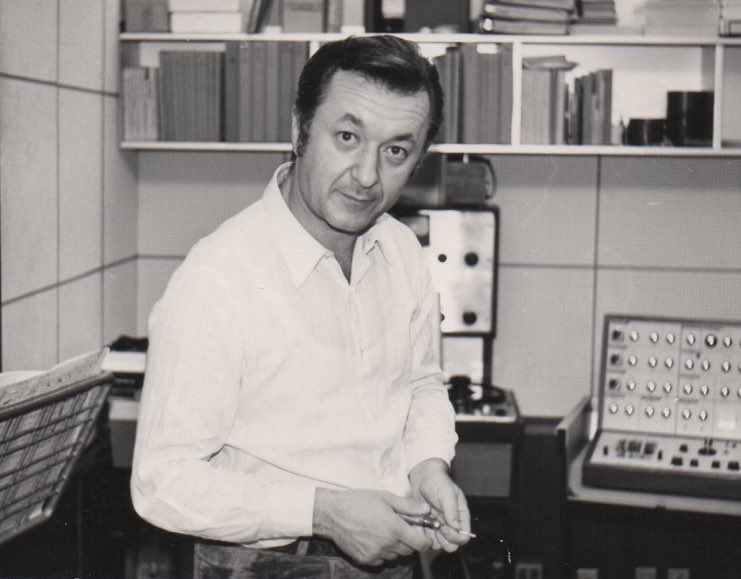
- Umiliani at his recording studio

Background information
- Born: 17 July 1926; Florence, Kingdom of Italy
- Origin: Italy
- Died: 14 February 2001 (aged 74) Rome, Italy
- Genres: Film music; classical
- Occupations: Composer; orchestrator; conductor; musician

Piero Umiliani (17 July 1926 – 14 February 2001) was an Italian composer of film scores.

== Biography ==
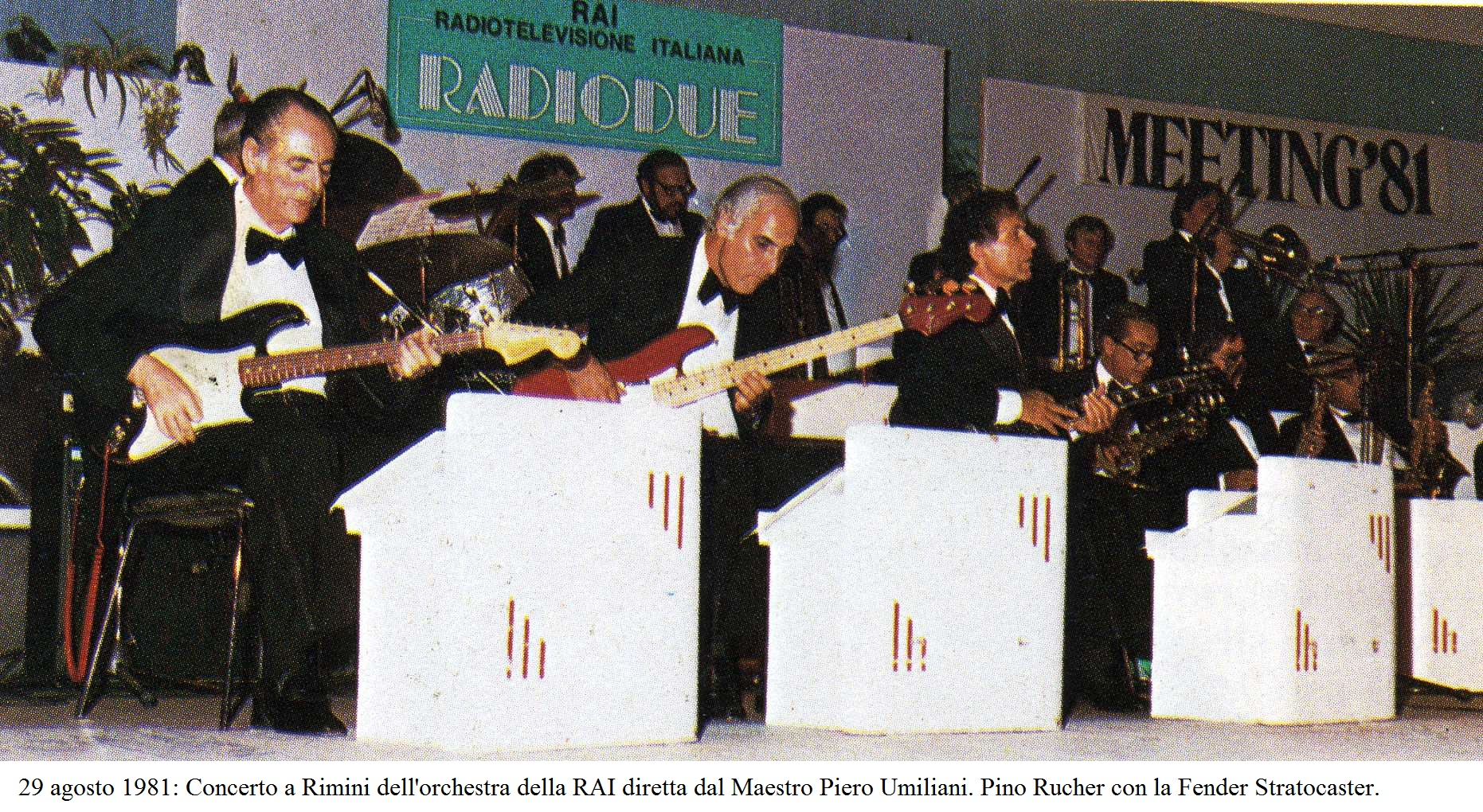
29 August 1981: Rimini Meeting. Concert in Rimini of the Rai Orchestra directed by Master Piero Umiliani.

Umiliani was born in Florence, Tuscany. Like many of his Italian colleagues at that time, he composed the scores for many exploitation films in the 1960s and 1970s, in genres such as spaghetti Westerns, Eurospy, giallo, and softcore sex films.

His composition "Mah Nà Mah Nà" (1968) was originally used in Sweden: Heaven and Hell, a 1968 Mondo documentary about Sweden. It was a minor charting single (spending 6 weeks on the Billboard chart and peaking at #55, and reaching #22 in Canada), popularized by The Red Skelton Show, first airing in October 1969, and The Muppets, who covered the song several times; starting on episode 0014 of Sesame Street on 27 November 1969, then The Ed Sullivan Show three days later, and again on the syndicated series The Muppet Show in 1977. The track was also a hit in the UK, reaching number 8 in the UK Singles Chart in May 1977.

Umiliani's other scores included Son of Django, Orgasmo, Gangster's Law, Death Knocks Twice, Five Dolls for an August Moon, Baba Yaga, The Slave and Sex Pot. His orchestra score "Arrivano I Marines" for War Italian Style, a 1966 comedy about two USMC soldiers in Italy, is used in the Armored Trooper Votoms series as "March of the Red Shoulders".

His composition "Crepuscolo Sul Mare" was used in Ocean's Twelve. More recently, his composition Echi Della Natura featured on the soundtrack of Ashim Ahluwalia’s 2012 film Miss Lovely.

Outside of his film score work, Umiliani formed the rock band Braen's Machine with Alessandro Alessandroni.

Umiliani died in Rome in February 2001, at the age of 74.

== Selected filmography ==
Year	Film	Directed by	Singles
1958	Big Deal on Madonna Street		
1960	The Traffic Policeman	Luigi Zampa	A1: Titoli Di Testa / A2: Il Vigile
1961	On the Tiger's Back		
1961	Creole Venus	Lorenzo Ricciardi	
1962	Getting Away with It the Italian Way	Lucio Fulci	
1962	Smog	Franco Rossi	
1963	Omicron	Ugo Gregoretti	Omicron (Titoli Di Testa)
1963	The Commandant (film)	Paolo Heusch	
1964	Intrigue in Los Angeles	Romano Ferrara	
1964	The World's Most Beautiful Swindlers	Various	
1964	Samson and His Mighty Challenge		
1965	La Celestina P... R...		
1965	Sons of the Leopard	Sergio Corbucci	
1965	Agent 3S3: Passport to Hell		
1965	The Reckless	Giuliano Montaldo	
1965	Two Mafiosi Against Goldfinger	Giorgio Simonelli	
1965	The Dreamer		
1965	Agente X 1-7 operazione Oceano	Tanio Boccia	
1965	Lady Morgan's Vengeance	Massimo Pupillo	
1965	Operation Poker	Osvaldo Civirani	
1966	Man on the Spying Trapeze	Juan de Orduña	
1966	Agent 3S3, Massacre in the Sun		
1966	Target Goldseven		
1966	Ring Around the World		
1966	Due mafiosi contro Al Capone		
1966	Requiem for a Secret Agent	Sergio Sollima	
1966	Blockhead		
1966	War Italian Style	Luigi Scattini	Arrivano I Marines
1966	Nero	Giovanni Vento	
1967	The Bridge of Asia	Corrado Sofia	
1967	Blueprint for a Massacre		
1967	Argoman the Fantastic Superman		
1967	Italians and Industry	Romolo Marcellini	
1967	Lotus Flowers for Miss Quon		
1967	Son of Django		
1967	Last of the Badmen		
1967	I barbieri di Sicilia		
1968	Il marchio di Kriminal		
1968	Two Eyes to Kill	Renato Borraccetti	
1968	Chrysanthemums for a Bunch of Swine	Sergio Pastore	
1968	Sweden: Heaven and Hell	Luigi Scattini	
1969	Orgasmo	Umberto Lenzi	Fate Had Planned It So
1969	The Archangel	Giorgio Capitani	
1969	Gangster's Law	Siro Marcellini	Crepuscolo Sul Mare
1969	Witchcraft '70	Luigi Scattini	
1969	Death Knocks Twice	Harald Philipp	
1970	Le Isole Dell'Amore	Pino de Martino	
1970	Five Dolls for an August Moon	Mario Bava	Cinevox / BX MDF 149: Cinque Bambole (Versione Coro) / Ti Risveglierai Con Me (Versione Film)
1970	A Quiet Place to Kill	Umberto Lenzi	
1970	Don Franco e Don Ciccio nell'anno della contestazione	Marino Girolami	
1970	Roy Colt and Winchester Jack	Mario Bava	
1970	Thou Shalt Not Covet Thy Fifth Floor Neighbour	Ramón Fernández	
1971	Vengeance Is a Dish Served Cold	Pasquale Squitieri	
1972	History and Prehistory		
1972	Il Mondo Dei Romani		
1972	Sex of Their Bodies	Luigi Scattini	
1973	La ragazza fuoristrada	Luigi Scattini	
1973	Baba Yaga	Corrado Farina	
1973	The Slave	Giorgio Capitani	
1974	La governante	Giovanni Grimaldi	
1974	The Body	Luigi Scattini	
1974	Blood River	Gianfranco Baldanello	
1974	Il domestico	Luigi Filippo D'Amico	
1975	Il fidanzamento	Giovanni Grimaldi	
1975	Sex Pot	Giorgio Capitani	
1975	The School Teacher	Nando Cicero	
1976	Eva Nera	Joe D'Amato	
1977	Twilight of Love	Luigi Scattini	
1977	Pane, burro e marmellata	Giorgio Capitani	
1978	Blue Nude	Luigi Scattini	
1978	The Soldier with Great Maneuvers	Nando Cicero	
1979	Lobster for Breakfast	Giorgio Capitani	
1980	I Hate Blondes	Giorgio Capitani	
1981	There Is a Ghost in My Bed	Luigi Scattini	
1981	Teste di quoio	Giorgio Capitani	
1981	Quando la coppia scoppia	Giorgio Capitani	
1982	Vai avanti tu che mi vien da ridere	Giorgio Capitani	

== Library music ==
Year	Album	Singles
1971	Paesaggi	
1971	Synthi Time	
1971	Underground	
1972	Percussioni ed effetti speciali	Echi della natura
1973	Temi ritmici e dinamici	
1973	To-Day's Sound	Open Space (4:16) / Slogan (4:10)
1974	Mondo inquieto	
1974	Musica classica per l'uomo d'oggi	
1974	Nuove arie romantiche	
1975	Paesi Balcani	
1978	Discomusic	
1978	Motivi allegri e distensivi	
1979	Film concerto	
1979	Panorama italiano	
1979	Tensione	
1981	Album di viaggio	
1983	Suspence elettronica	
