= Francesco D'Adda =

Italian actor (born 1943)

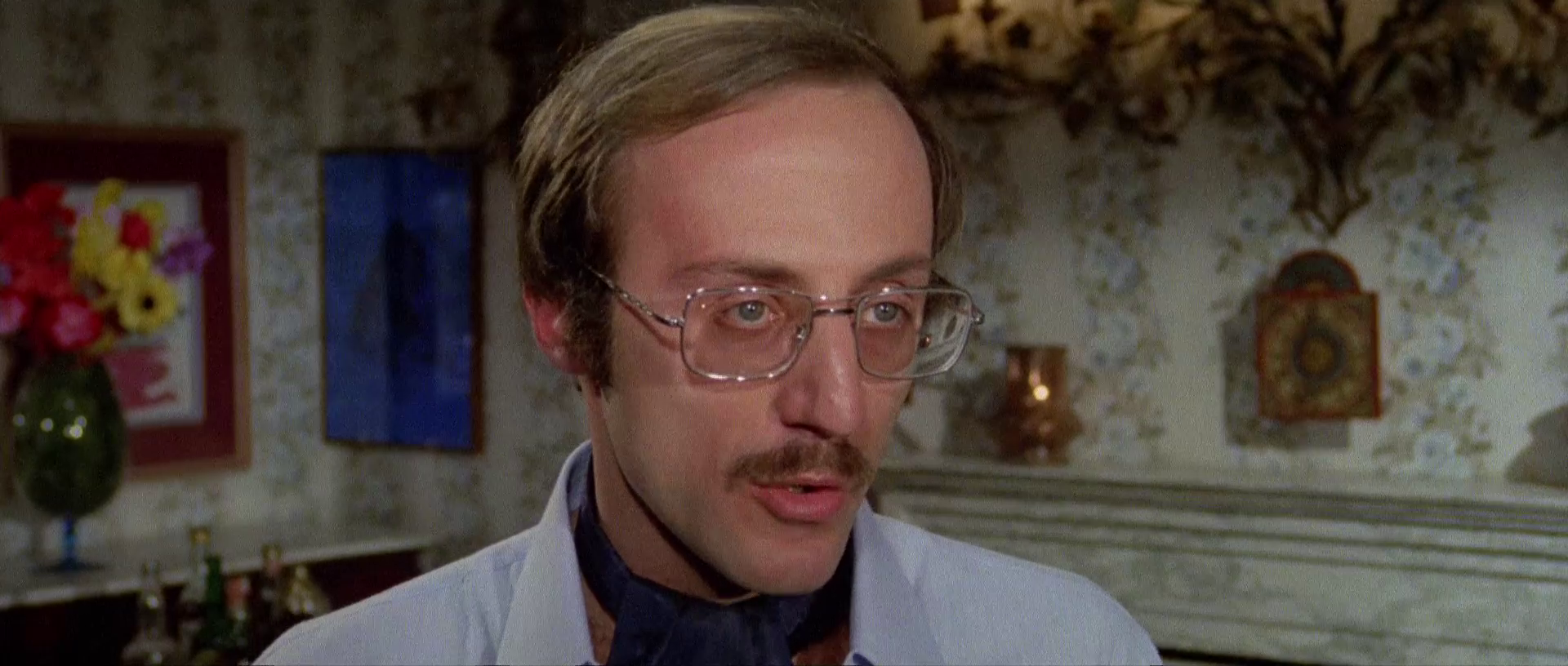
- D'Adda in Almost Human (1974)
- Born: 15 October 1943 (age 82); Rome, Italy
- Occupation: Actor
- Years active: 1970-present

Francesco D'Adda (born 15 October 1943) is an Italian actor. He appeared in more than seventy films since 1970.

== Selected filmography ==
Year	Title	Role	Notes
1971	In the Name of the Italian People		
1971	Stanza 17-17 palazzo delle tasse, ufficio imposte		
1972	The Weapon, the Hour & the Motive		
1973	Giovannona Long-Thigh		
1973	Bread and Chocolate		
1975	Mark of the Cop		
1975	Mark Shoots First		
1975	Killer Cop		
1976	Quel movimento che mi piace tanto		
1976	Tell Me You Do Everything for Me		
1976	L'affittacamere		
1976	Cross Shot		
1977	Brothers Till We Die		
1977	An Average Little Man		
1982	Bomber		
