= The Off-Road Girl =

1973 film by Luigi Scattini

- Directed by: Luigi Scattini
- Screenplay by: Leo Chiosso; Gustavo Palazio
- Starring: Zeudi Araya; Luc Merenda
- Cinematography: Antonio Borghesi
- Edited by: Luigi Scattini
- Music by: Piero Umiliani
- Release date: 1972
- Language: Italian

The Off-Road Girl (Italian: La ragazza fuoristrada, also spelled La ragazza fuori strada) is a 1973 Italian romantic drama film directed by Luigi Scattini.

== Plot ==
Giorgio Martini, an advertising journalist on a story in Egypt, falls in love with Maryam, a beautiful Nubian girl. He takes her with him to Ferrara, introduces her to his parents, and, despite their hesitation, marries her. Maryam's naiveté, spontaneity, and sincerity burst forth in this provincial town, clashing with a hypocritical, petty, and racist environment. She then falls victim to the cruel trickery of the journalist's former lover and a prank played by two rejected friends. Giorgio, believing that Maryam has betrayed him, begins to neglect her. After having an abortion, she abandons him and returns to her people.

== Cast ==
- Zeudi Araya as Maryam
- Luc Merenda as Giorgio Martini
- Martine Brochard as Mara
- Lucretia Love as Adriana Morganti
- Giacomo Rossi Stuart as Dr. Giulio Morganti
- Caterina Boratto as Silvia Marino
- Tony Kendall as Carlo Franzero
- Franco Ressel as Pino Bordoni
- Guido Alberti as Monsignor Vittorio Baudano

== Production ==
The film was a co-production between Filmarpa and P.A.C. It was mainly shot in Ravenna.

== Reception ==
Antonio Guastella from Nocturno praised the film for focusing on the topic of racism in the Italian society, a non-obvious choice for the time especially in Italian genre films, and described it as "a Danse Macabre of small-town atmospheres and moods, which, despite its stereotopical nature [...], is well crafted and delivered with enjoyable gusto". La Stampa film critic Achille Valdata noted: "Entrusted to an actress who is still immature, though very promising and full of an instinctive charge of sympathy, the drama does not always come across as thorough and persuasive. The corrupt provincial society is depicted too crudely, so that it becomes bogus, as well as the psychological transitions are, in general, rather approximate".

== Soundtrack ==
In his analysis of Piero Umiliani's film scores, Kristopher Spencer described Umiliani's score for this film as well as for other Zeudi Araya's vehicles La ragazza dalla pelle di luna and The Body, as "a satisfying mélange of funky grooves, sensual ballads, jazz - rock abstractions and fun-in-the-sun capypso ditties". Araya performs two songs of the soundtrack, "Oltre l'acqua del fiume" and "Maryam". The soundtrack also include an Ornella Vanoni cover version of Bruno Lauzi's "Ritornerai", which was later also used in Nanni Moretti's The Mass Is Ended.
