= Twilight of Love =

- Directed by: Luigi Scattini
- Written by: Claude Fournier; Giacomo Rossi-Stuart; Luigi Scattini; Vittorio Schiraldi
- Produced by: Carlo Ponti; Fulvio Lucisano
- Cinematography: Benito Frattari
- Music by: Piero Umiliani
- Release date: 1977
- Language: Italian

Twilight of Love (Italian: La notte dell'alta marea, also known as The Night of the High Tide and Lure of Love) is a 1977 Italian romance film written and directed by Luigi Scattini. It is based on the novel Il corpo by Alfredo Todisco. it was one of the last times Steel would be top billed in a movie.

== Plot ==
Richard, an elderly director of a Montreal advertising agency, met Dyanne, a young girl who appears to be a perfect model for the launch of a new perfume. During the stay on a beautiful deserted island, where they had gone to make the photo shoot, Richard falls in love with the girl.

== Cast ==
- Anthony Steel as Richard Butler
- Annie Belle as Dyanne
- Hugo Pratt as Pierre
- Pam Grier as Sandra
- Giacomo Rossi-Stuart as Guide
- Alain Montpetit as Photographer
- Gerardo Amato as Philip
