= Mark Strikes Again =

- DVD Cover
- Directed by: Stelvio Massi
- Screenplay by: Dardano Sacchetti
- Story by: Lucio De Caro
- Starring: Franco Gasparri; John Saxon; Marcella Michelangeli; Giampiero Albertini
- Cinematography: Mario Vulpiani
- Edited by: Mauro Bonanni
- Music by: Stelvio Cipriani
- Production company: P.A.C.
- Distributed by: P.A.C.
- Release date: 20 October 1976 (Italy)
- Running time: 95 minutes
- Country: Italy
- Box office: ₤657,027 million

Mark Strikes Again (Italian: Mark colpisce ancora, also known as The .44 Specialist) is a 1976 Italian poliziottesco film directed by Stelvio Massi. Initially planned as an original film, during the shoots and the post-production process it was turned into a second sequel of Mark of the Cop (after Mark Shoots First).

== Cast ==
- Franco Gasparri: Mark Patti
- John Saxon: Inspector Altman
- Marcella Michelangeli: Olga Kuber
- Giampiero Albertini: Inspector Mantelli
- John Steiner: Paul Henkel
- Paul Muller: Austrian Inspector
- Malisa Longo: Isa

== Production ==
Mark Strikes Again was filmed at Icet - De Paolis in Milan and on location in Rome.

== Release ==
Mark Strikes Again was distributed theatrically in Italy by PAC on October 20, 1976. It grossed a total of 657,027,130 Italian lire domestically. The film was released as The .44 Specialist on home video in the Nederlands and Germany.

== See also ==
- List of Italian films of 1976
