= Sette scialli di seta gialla =

- Theatrical release poster
- Directed by: Sergio Pastore
- Written by: Alessandro Continenza; Sergio Pastore; Giovanni Simonelli
- Produced by: Edmondo Amati; Maurizio Amati
- Starring: Anthony Steffen; Sylva Koscina; Jeannette Len; Renato De Carmine; Giacomo Rossi-Stuart; Umberto Raho; Annabella Incontrera; Shirley Corrigan
- Cinematography: Guglielmo Mancori
- Edited by: Vincenzo Tomassi
- Music by: Manuel De Sica
- Production company: Capitolina Produzioni Cinematografiche
- Distributed by: Peppercorn-Wormser Film Enterprises
- Release date: 12 August 1972 (Italy)
- Running time: 90 min; USA: 96 min; Italy: 95 min
- Country: Italy
- Languages: Italian; English

Sette scialli di seta gialla/ Seven Shawls of Yellow Silk (International title: Crimes of the Black Cat) is a 1972 Italian giallo film. It was directed by Sergio Pastore and written by Pastore, Alessandro Continenza, and Giovanni Simonelli. Sette scialli di seta gialla stars Anthony Steffen, Sylva Koscina, Jeannette Len, Renato De Carmine, Giacomo Rossi-Stuart, and Umberto Raho.

The film has been cited as being inspired by Dario Argento's The Bird with the Crystal Plumage, and has been called "entertainingly flamboyant" by one reviewer.

== Plot ==
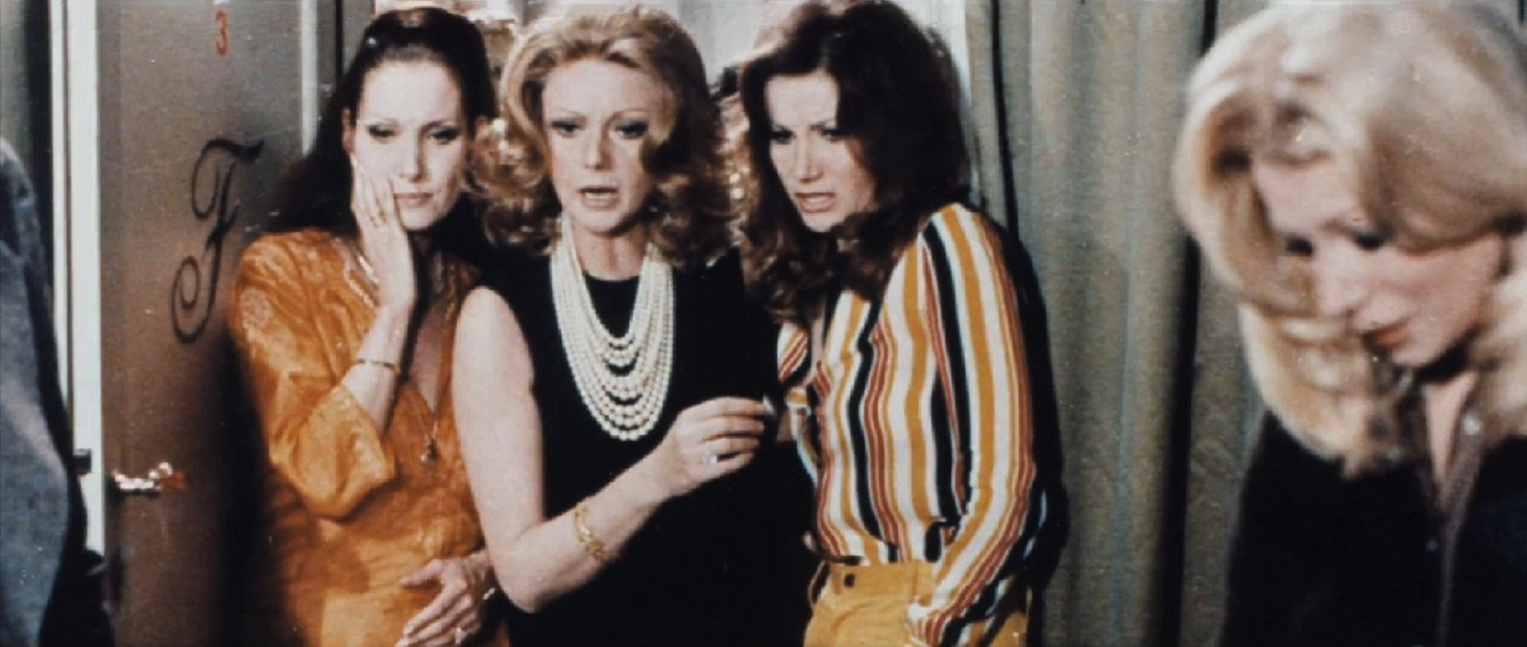
Annabella Incontrera, Sylva Koscina, Liliana Pavlo, and Shirley Corrigan in a scene from the film.

Several fashion models are killed by a murderer who poisons a cat's claws with curare. Each victim is given a shawl as a gift, which is laced with a chemical attracting the cat. The first such victim, Paola, had been in a relationship with a blind composer, Peter Oliver who overhears a conversation he believes may help him track down the killer. Oliver, aided by his butler Burton tracks the cat to its owner Susan, who is murdered before she can reveal who has been using the cat. However, the identity of the killer is eventually discovered to be Françoise, the owner of the studio employing the murdered models. Francoise had killed Paola after discovering that her husband Victor had been having an affair with the young model, and had committed the other murders to help cover up the motive for the first killing.

== Cast ==
- Anthony Steffen (English dubbing: Edmund Purdom) as Peter Oliver
- Sylva Koscina as Françoise Ballais
- Giacomo Rossi Stuart as Victor Morgan
- Jeannette Len (credited as Giovanna Lenzi)
- Umberto Raho as Burton
- Renato De Carmine as Inspector Jansen
- Annabella Incontrera as Helga Schurn
- Shirley Corrigan as Margot Thornhill
- Romano Malaspina
- Imelde Marani
- Liliana Pavlo
- Irio Fantini

== Production ==
Production of Sette scialli di seta gialla began on 31 March 1972. The film has been described as part of a "boom" of "imitative whodunits" released after the success of Dario Argento's L'uccello dalle piume di cristallo, along with such films as Una lucertola con la pelle di donna and Los ojos azules de la muñeca rota. Alessandro Continenza and Giovanni Simonelli, who wrote the script alongside director Sergio Pastore, had previously collaborated on the screenplay for the 1966 Spaghetti Western Django spara per primo. The film's title has been noted as one of many giallo titles using either numbers or animal references, having been directly compared to Sette note in nero.

== Release ==
Sette scialli di seta gialla was released on 12 August 1972 in Italy. The title translates as Seven Shawls of Yellow Silk. It has also been distributed under the title Crimes of the Black Cat.

== Critical reception ==
Allmovie gave the film a positive review, calling it "an underrated gem" and one of the most "entertainingly flamboyant" giallo films.

== Footnotes ==
=== References ===
- Giovannini, Fabio (1986). Dario Argento: il brivido, il sangue, il thrilling. Edizione Dedalo. ISBN 8822045165.
- Marriott, James (2012). Horror Films. Random House. ISBN 978-1448132102.
- Newman, Kim (2011). Nightmare Movies: Horror on Screen Since the 1960s (Second, illustrated ed.). Bloomsbury Publishing. ISBN 978-1408805039.
