= Neapolitan Mystery =

1979 film

- Film poster
- Directed by: Sergio Corbucci
- Written by: Giuseppe Catalano; Sabatino Ciuffini; Elvio Porta
- Produced by: Paolo Infascelli; Achille Manzotti
- Starring: Marcello Mastroianni
- Cinematography: Luigi Kuveiller
- Edited by: Amedeo Salfa
- Music by: Riz Ortolani
- Release date: 12 April 1979
- Running time: 114 minutes
- Country: Italy
- Language: Italian

Neapolitan Mystery (Italian: Giallo napoletano) is a 1979 Italian mystery film directed by Sergio Corbucci. The film is also known as Atrocious Tales of Love and Death.

== Cast ==
- Marcello Mastroianni as Raffaele Capece
- Ornella Muti as Lucia Navarro
- Renato Pozzetto as Police Inspector
- Michel Piccoli as Conductor Navarro
- Zeudi Araya as Elizabeth
- Capucine as Sister Angela
- Peppino De Filippo as Raffaele's Father
- Elena Fiore as Filomena
- Peppe Barra as Giardino (credited as Giuseppe Barra)
- Ennio Antonelli
- Armando Curcio
- Nicola Di Gioia as Prostituta
- Salvatore Furnari
- Franco Iavarone
- Giovanni Imparato
- Gennarino Palumbo
- Franca Scagnetti
- Carlo Taranto
- Natale Tulli
- Tomas Arana as Husband (uncredited)
