= Mr. Robinson (film) =

1976 film directed by Sergio Corbucci

Mr. Robinson -Il Signor Robinson: mostruosa storia d'amore e d'avventure-
- Italian theatrical release poster
- Directed by: Sergio Corbucci
- Written by: Paolo Villaggio; Castellano e Pipolo; Sergio Corbucci
- Produced by: Franco Cristaldi
- Starring: Paolo Villaggio, Zeudi Araya
- Cinematography: Marcello Gatti
- Edited by: Amedeo Salfa
- Music by: Guido & Maurizio De Angelis
- Release date: 1976
- Running time: 107 minutes
- Country: Italy
- Language: Italian

Mr. Robinson (Italian: Il signor Robinson, mostruosa storia d'amore e d'avventure, also known as Robinson Jr.) is a 1976 Italian comedy film directed by Sergio Corbucci. It is a parody of the Daniel Defoe's 1719 novel Robinson Crusoe.

== Plot ==
The Milanese fashion guru Roberto Minghelli embarks with his wife on a cruise. One morning he wakes up in a now-sunken ship but is able to escape to an island, where he finds an abandoned hut which had a famous owner, Robinson Crusoe. Although the city slicker seems to be completely unsuitable for survival on a deserted island, Roberto adapts over time to his location and even leads a relatively happy life. But then he discovers that he is not alone on the island: a pretty young native, whom he calls Friday, joins him, and things start to be more complicated.

== Cast ==
- Paolo Villaggio as Roberto Minghelli / Robinio / Robinson
- Zeudi Araya as Friday
- Anna Nogara as Magda
- Percy Hogan as Mandingo

== See also ==
- List of Italian films of 1976
