= The Archangel =

1969 film

- Film poster
- Directed by: Giorgio Capitani
- Written by: Adriano Baracco; Giorgio Capitani; Renato Castellani
- Starring: Vittorio Gassman; Pamela Tiffin; Irina Demick; Adolfo Celi
- Cinematography: Stelvio Massi
- Edited by: Sergio Montanari
- Music by: Piero Umiliani
- Distributed by: 20th Century Fox
- Release date: 24 April 1969
- Running time: 106 minutes
- Country: Italy
- Language: Italian

The Archangel (Italian: L'arcangelo) is a 1969 Italian comedy film directed by Giorgio Capitani and starring Vittorio Gassman.

== Cast ==
- Vittorio Gassman as Fulvio Bertuccia
- Pamela Tiffin as Gloria Bianchi
- Irina Demick as Sig.ra Tarocchi Roda
- Adolfo Celi as Marco Tarocchi Roda
- Laura Antonelli
- Carlo Baccarini
- Carlo Delle Piane
- Mario De Rosa
- Gioia Desideri
- Tom Felleghy as Fabris
- Antonio Guidi
- Corrado Olmi
- Carlo Pisacane
- Gianni Pulone
- Jacob Stanislave
- Pippo Starnazza
