= Braen's Machine =

Italian rock band

Braen's Machine was an Italian rock band formed in 1971. While initially anonymous, credited only to "Braen" and "Gisteri", it was later revealed that the band was a project of composer Piero Umiliani and composer/guitarist Alessandro Alessandroni. As the two were prolific composers of film scores, Braen's Machine existed as a creative outlet to explore other genres: psychedelic rock, jazz, progressive rock, and funk-oriented library music. AllMusic states that all of the instruments were performed by Umiliani and Alessandroni; the liner notes credit Umiliani as producer and Alessandroni as the guitarist, and also include composer Rino De Filippi (also known as Oronzo De Filippi), drummer Gegè Munari, bassist Maurizio Majorana, and keyboardist Antonello Vannucchi.

== Discography ==
- Underground (Liuto Records, 1971)
- Quarta Pagina (Poliziesco) (Liuto Records, 1971)
- Temi Ritmici E Dinamici (Liuto Records, 1973)
