= The Sinner (1975 film) =

1975 film by Pier Ludovico Pavoni

- Directed by: Pier Ludovico Pavoni
- Screenplay by: Oretta Emmolo; Pier Ludovico Pavoni
- Produced by: Leo Pescarolo
- Starring: Zeudi Araya; Francisco Rabal; Franco Gasparri
- Cinematography: Fausto Rossi
- Edited by: Luciano Anconetani
- Music by: Franco Bixio; Fabio Frizzi; Vince Tempera
- Release date: 1975
- Language: Italian

The Sinner (Italian: La peccatrice) is a 1975 Italian romantic drama film co-written and directed by Pier Ludovico Pavoni.

== Cast ==
- Zeudi Araya as Debrha
- Francisco Rabal as 'the Turk'
- Franco Gasparri as Michele
- Clara Calamai as Turk's wife
- Ettore Manni as Santuzzo
- Alain Le Grand as Salvatore Santalena
- Rita Forzano as Inuzza
- Sonia Viviani as Carmelina
- Gianni Ottaviani as 'the Mute'

== Production ==
The film was a produced by P.A.C. It was the last film of Clara Calamai and the last film directed by Pavoni.

== Reception ==
Italian film critic Marco Giusti described the film as "remarkable", a "curious Matarazzata with a fine cast and a Zeudi Araya at her best". Antonio Guastella from Nocturno described it as a "turgidly retro" and more socially engaged variation of Pavoni's previous effort Amore libero - Free Love. He wrote "Interesting in the beginning [...] it loses its way in the second half, becoming rushed and sluggish, despite its excellent sets and a particularly evocative music interspersed with singer-songwriter Rosa Balistreri's voice". According to Paolo Mereghetti, the film is midway between art cinema and fotoromanzo, with too many stereotypes about the fatalism, attitude, and immobility of Sicily.
