= Giampiero Albertini =

Italian actor (1927–1991)

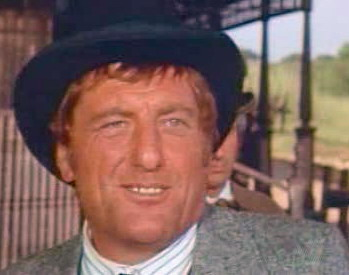
- Albertini on the set of Return of Sabata (1971)
- Born: 20 December 1927; Muggiò, Italy
- Died: 14 May 1991 (aged 63); Rome, Italy
- Occupations: Actor; voice actor
- Years active: 1955–1991
- Height: 1.70 m (5 ft 7 in)
- Children: 3

Giampiero Albertini (20 December 1927 – 14 May 1991) was an Italian actor and voice actor.

== Biography ==
Born in Muggiò, Albertini started his career as stage actor at the Piccolo Teatro in Milan, under the guidance of Giorgio Strehler. In 1962, he made his film debut with Dino Risi's La marcia su Roma, and later worked with Mario Monicelli, Luigi Comencini, Carlo Lizzani, Francesco Rosi, Gillo Pontecorvo, Nanni Loy. He also acted in poliziotteschi and giallo films, in which he was sometimes credited as Al Albert.

As a voice actor, Albertini was best known as the official Italian dubbing voice of Peter Falk as the title character in Columbo. He also occasionally dubbed other actors such as Martin Balsam, Donald Pleasence, Phil Brown, Brian Keith, Terry Jones and Vic Tayback. One of his final dubbing works was the voice of Saddam Hussein in his interview with Bruno Vespa on Rai 1. He also dubbed J. Audubon Woodlore in Hooked Bear, Grand Canyonscope and Grin and Bear It.

== Death ==
Albertini died of a heart attack, at his home in Monte Mario in Rome, on 14 May 1991 at the age of 63. The dubbing voice of Columbo was passed on to Antonio Guidi in the remaining seasons of the show.

== Filmography ==
=== Cinema ===
- March on Rome (1962) – Cristoforo
- The Organizer (1963) – Porro
- La vita agra (1964) – Libero Fornaciari
- Thrilling (1965) – Il "Rosso" (segment "L'autostrada del sole")
- Seven Golden Men (1965) – August (le portugais)
- Made in Italy (1965) – Immigrant (segment "6 Final episode")
- Seven Golden Men Strike Again (1966) – August
- The Million Dollar Countdown (1967) – Joe
- Tiffany Memorandum (1967) – Callaghan's Agent / Doctor
- The Head of the Family (1967)
- Italian Secret Service (1968) – Ottone
- Days of Fire (1968) – Sempresi
- A Minute to Pray, a Second to Die (1968) – Fred Duskin
- Summit (1968)
- The Black Sheep (1968) – Senator Santarini
- Commandos (1968) – Aldo
- Eat It (1968) – Farmer
- Burn! (1969) – Henry Thompson
- Bolidi sull'asfalto – A tutta birra! (1970) – Albertarelli
- Many Wars Ago (1970) – Capt. Abbati
- Return of Sabata (1971) – Joe McIntock
- The Life of Leonardo da Vinci (1971) – Ludovico il Moro
- The Case of the Bloody Iris (1972) – Commissioner Enci
- Halleluja to Vera Cruz (1973) – Gen. Miguel
- Seven Hours of Violence (1973) – Police Commissioner
- La rosa rossa (1973)
- The Suspects (1974) – Matteo Gallone
- E cominciò il viaggio nella vertigine (1974) – Train's escort officer
- Zorro (1975) – Brother Francisco
- Mark of the Cop (1975) – Brigadiere Bonetti
- The Tough Ones (1976) – Commissioner Caputo
- L'Année sainte (1976) – Commissaire Mazzola
- A Matter of Time (1976) – Mr. De Perma
- Mark Strikes Again (1976) – Montelli
- The Last Round (1976) – Sapienza
- Le Gang (1977) – Léon
- Tre soldi e la donna di classe (1977)
- Return of the 38 Gang (1977) – Folco Bordoni
- Dove volano i corvi d'argento (1977) – Istevene's father
- Non sparate sui bambini (1978) – Sign. Settimi
- Suggestionata (1978) – Francesco / Rachele's father
- The Life of Verdi (1982)
- The Betrothed (1989)
- Saremo felici (1989)

== Dubbing roles ==
=== Animation ===
- Smoke in Cartoon All-Stars to the Rescue

=== Live action ===
- Lieutenant Colombo in Columbo (seasons 1–8)
- Sam Diamond in Murder by Death
- Lou Peckinpaugh in The Cheap Detective
- Peter Falk in Wings of Desire
- Ray Calhoun in Hang 'Em High
- Tang Wu in The Love Bug
- Owen Lars in Star Wars: Episode IV – A New Hope
- Sheriff Jellicol in The Big Gundown
- Mel Sharples in Alice Doesn't Live Here Anymore
- Theodore Roosevelt in The Wind and the Lion
- Bennett Cross in Death Wish 3
- Sanchez in Mackenna's Gold
- Ernst Stavro Blofeld in You Only Live Twice
- Sir Bedevere in Monty Python and the Holy Grail
