= The Glass Sphinx =

- Italian film poster
- Directed by: Luigi Scattini
- Starring: Robert Taylor; Anita Ekberg
- Music by: Les Baxter; Roberto Pregadio
- Distributed by: AIP
- Release date: 31 May 1967 (Italy)
- Countries: Italy; United States
- Language: English

The Glass Sphinx (Italian: La sfinge d'oro) is an Italian-American 1967 adventure film directed by Luigi Scattini.

== Plot ==
An expedition led by a millionaire is going to Egypt to find the priceless Glass Sphinx buried in a tomb. His assistant is an expert in Egyptian tombs. They pick up an exotic beauty along the way, as well as a mysterious follower of the expedition.

== Cast ==
- Robert Taylor as Prof. Karl Nichols
- Anita Ekberg as Paulette
- Gianna Serra as Jenny
- Giacomo Rossi-Stuart as Ray (credited as Jack Stuart)
- Ángel del Pozo as Alex
- Remo De Angelis as Mirko
- José Truchado as Theo
- Emad Hamdy as Fouad
- Ahmed Kamis as Chief Shoukry
- Mohammed Tawfik
- Lidia Biondi

== Notes ==
- Filmed in Egypt
- Released in the United States in 1968.

== See also ==
- List of American films of 1967
