= Franco Gasparri =

Italian actor (1948–1999)

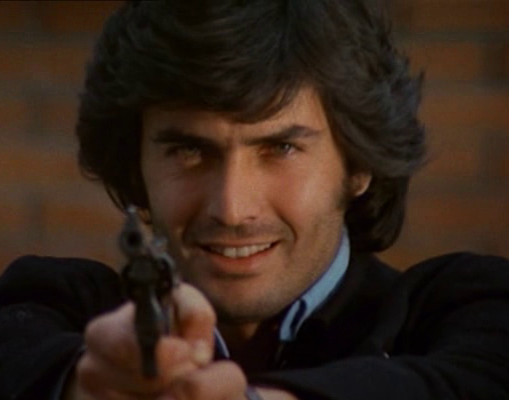
- Born: Gianfranco Gasparri; 31 October 1948; Senigallia
- Died: 28 March 1999 (aged 50); Rome
- Height: 1.87 m (6 ft 2 in)

Franco Gasparri (31 October 1948 – 28 March 1999) was an Italian actor.

Born Gianfranco Gasparri in Senigallia, the son of the painter and film poster artist Rodolfo, Gasparri started his career as a child actor, appearing in several peplum films. After military service as a paratrooper, in 1970 he became one of the most successful actors in fotoromanzi. In 1975 Gasparri got a large notoriety playing the inspector Mark Terzi in Mark of the Cop, a successful poliziottesco which generated two sequels, Mark Shoots First and Mark Strikes Again, still with Gasparri in the title role. A skilled and experienced rider, due to a near-fatal motorcycle accident he was forced in a wheelchair, giving up his promising career. He died at 50 years old from respiratory failure.

== Filmography ==
Year	Title	Role	Notes
1961	Goliath Against the Giants		
1961	Samson	Mila's Son	
1962	The Fury of Hercules	Alceo	
1966	Mano di velluto	Ragazzo che parla con wendy d'olive a villa sorriso	Uncredited
1973	Ultimatum		
1974	The Prey	Francis	
1975	The Sinner	Michele	
1975	Mark of the Cop	Commissario Mark Terzi	
1975	Mark Shoots First	Commissario Mark Terzi	
1976	Mark Strikes Again	Mark Patti	(final film role)
