= Mark of the Cop =

- DVD cover
- Directed by: Stelvio Massi
- Screenplay by: Adriano Bolzoni; Raniero Di Giovanbattista; Stelvano Massi
- Story by: Dardano Sacchetti
- Cinematography: Marcello Gatti
- Edited by: Mauro Bonanni
- Music by: Stelvio Cipriani
- Production company: Produzioni Atlas Consorziate
- Distributed by: Produzioni Atlas Consorziate
- Release date: August 1, 1975 (Italy)
- Running time: 91 minutes
- Country: Italy
- Box office: ₤1.667 billion

Mark il poliziotto (internationally released as Mark of the Cop, Blood, Sweat and Fear and Mark the Narc) is an Italian poliziottesco film directed in 1975 by Stelvio Massi. The film obtained a great commercial success and generated two sequels, Mark il poliziotto spara per primo and Mark colpisce ancora. The film marked the breakthrough for the lead actor, Franco Gasparri, who was already a star of Italian fotoromanzi.

== Cast ==
- Franco Gasparri as Inspector Mark Terzi
- Lee J. Cobb as Lawyer Benzi
- Giorgio Albertazzi as Quaestor
- Sara Sperati as Irene
- Carlo Duran as Gruber
- Giampiero Albertini as Brigadiere Bonetti
- Andrea Aureli as Benzi's Vice
- Francesco D'Adda as Investigating judge
- Dada Gallotti as Irene's mother

== Release ==
Mark of the Cop was released on August 1, 1975, in Italy where it was distributed by Produzioni Atlas Consorziate. It grossed a total of 1,667,090,170 Italian lire during its theatrical release in Italy. The film has been released in the United States as Mark of the Cop and in Europe as Mark the Narc.
