= The Prey (1974 film) =

1974 film

- Italian theatrical release poster
- Directed by: Domenico Paolella
- Cinematography: Armando Nannuzzi
- Music by: Fabio Frizzi; Vince Tempera
- Release date: 1974
- Countries: Italy; Colombia
- Language: Italian

The Prey (Italian: La preda) is a 1974 Italian-Colombian erotic drama film directed by Domenico Paolella.

The film follow a man's attempt to escape his dysfunctional marriage. Things go horribly wrong when the attempt does not go as planned.

== Cast ==
- Zeudi Araya as Laggaina
- Franco Gasparri as Francis
- Micheline Presle as Betsy
- Renzo Montagnani as Daniel Lester
