= Antonio Guidi =

Italian actor and voice actor

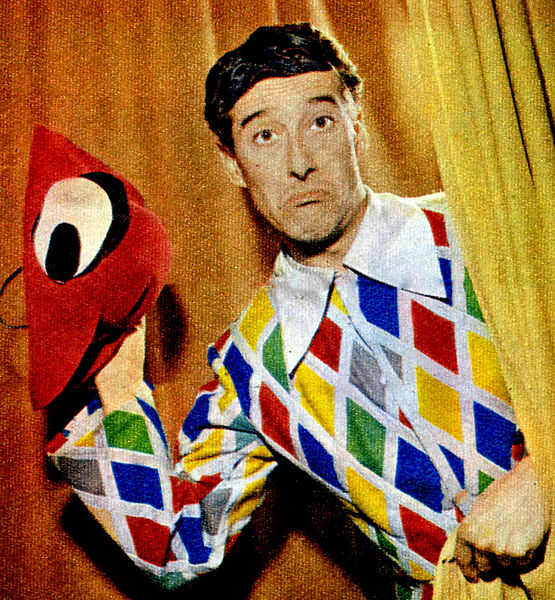
- Guidi on the television program Il teatro di Arlecchino (1959)
- Born: 28 October 1927; Ferrara, Italy
- Died: 17 October 2013 (aged 85); Bergamo, Italy
- Occupations: Actor; voice actor
- Years active: 1951–2004

Antonio Guidi (28 October 1927 – 17 October 2013) was an Italian actor and voice actor.

== Biography ==
Born in Ferrara, Guidi began a career of acting in the 1950s. He originally wanted to become an architect but he did not pursue that vocation. He worked for two years at the Piccolo Teatro in Milan, then he became a stage actor. In addition, he also worked on radio and screen. He made his first ever film appearance in The Archangel starring Vittorio Gassman and on television, he made his debut on I legionari dello spazio.

Guidi was also a professional voice actor. He was the official Italian voice of Peter Ustinov as well as dubbing Peter Falk and Dominic Chianese in most of their work. He was internationally renowned for performing the Italian voice of Lieutenant Colombo (portrayed by Peter Falk) in the last two seasons of Columbo since the death of Giampiero Albertini in 1991. He also voiced Prince John in the Italian-Language version of the 1973 animated film Robin Hood.

After finishing his voice work on Colombo, Guidi retired in 2004, effectively ending his career.

== Death ==
Guidi died in Bergamo on 17 October 2013, eleven days before his 86th birthday.

== Filmography ==
=== Cinema ===
- The Archangel (1969)
- The Killer Is on the Phone (1972)
- At Last, at Last (1975)
- Young, Violent, Dangerous (1976)
- Hanno ucciso un altro bandito (1976)
- Ombre (1980)

=== Television ===
- I legionari dello spazio (1966)
- Delitto di regime - Il caso Don Minzoni (1973)
- La commediante veneziana (1979)

== Dubbing roles ==
=== Animation ===
- Prince John in Robin Hood

=== Live action ===
- Lieutenant Colombo in Columbo (seasons 9-11)
- Fred G. Sanford in Sanford and Son
- Fred G. Sanford in Sanford
- Hercule Poirot in Evil Under the Sun
- Hercule Poirot in Death on the Nile
- The Old Man in Logan's Run
- Herod the Great / Pontius Pilate in Jesus of Nazareth
- Rowlie in Lassie Come Home (1975 redub)
- President in Being There
- Gloves Malloy / Spats Baxter in Movie Movie
- Alonzo A. Hawk in Herbie Rides Again
- Ed Hocken in The Naked Gun: From the Files of Police Squad!
- Roy Bensinger in The Front Page
- Chiz in Countdown

=== Video games ===
- Alexandre Valembois in Amerzone
