= March on Rome (film) =

1962 Italian comedy film

- Italian: La marcia su Roma
- Directed by: Dino Risi
- Written by: Age & Scarpelli; Sandro Continenza; Dino Risi; Ghigo De Chiara; Ruggero Maccari
- Produced by: Mario Cecchi Gori
- Starring: Ugo Tognazzi; Vittorio Gassman
- Cinematography: Alfio Contini
- Edited by: Alberto Gallitti
- Music by: Marcello Giombini
- Distributed by: Lux Film (Dino de Laurentiis)
- Release date: 1962
- Running time: 94 minutes
- Country: Italy
- Language: Italian

March on Rome (Italian: La marcia su Roma) is a 1962 comedy film by Dino Risi with Vittorio Gassman and Ugo Tognazzi, aimed at describing the March on Rome of Benito Mussolini's blackshirts from the point of view of two newly recruited, naïve blackshirts.

The movie's main theme is the gradual betrayal of all the promises of the National Fascist Party: the two gradually tick all the main points of the fascist program as described on a propaganda flyer every time they are contradicted by practice. In its early stages fascism was a radical republican movement, suspicious of large businesses, nobility and the Catholic Church (Mussolini himself had been a socialist earlier in his career, being cast out of the Italian Socialist Party when his nationalism grew more and more pronounced). When arriving in Rome, and having ticked them all off, they leave the fascist party in the moment of its victory.

== Plot summary ==
The film is set in Italy in 1922. Two friends returning from the First World War, Rocchetti and Gavazza, join the Fascist Party in Milan. While the latter is an opportunist, the former is a Roman Catholic who is persuaded by his friend to join the party, and is convinced by the revolutionary program issued in Piazza San Sepolcro. In October, the two friends join a group of Fascists marching to Rome to take, but during the trip Rocchetti, seeing the behaviour of the fascist officials and the forces which help the party, gradually gives up his hopes about the fascist revolutionary program. When Rocchetti finally tries to escape, he is beaten almost to death. Gavazza saves him, and runs away with his friend. However, the March on Rome is made, and the two friends cannot help but watch in silence as the political change happens. The last scene of the movie shows King Victor Emmanuel III watching from the balcony of the Quirinal Palace the fascists. He then turns to Grand Admiral Paolo Thaon di Revel and tells him that he is willing to "test the fascists for some months".

== Cast ==
- Vittorio Gassman: Domenico Rocchetti
- Ugo Tognazzi: Umberto Gavazza
- Roger Hanin: Capitano Paolinelli
- Mario Brega: Marcacci "Mitraglia"
- Angela Luce: Contadina
- Giampiero Albertini: Cristoforo
- Liù Bosisio: Adelina
- Daniele Vargas: "Sua Eccellenza"
- Howard Nelson Rubiens : Judge Bellinzoni

== Quotes ==
- The expedition is burning down a building of the Communist Party. Umberto asks why they are contradicting their declared principles of freedom of speech. Domenico replies that "They have freedom of speech, we have the freedom of beating them up. If they do not want to speak because they are afraid, so..."
