= Marching in Darkness =

- Italian: Marciando nel buio
- Directed by: Massimo Spano
- Screenplay by: Massimo Spano; Claudio Lizza
- Story by: Massimo Spano
- Produced by: Zeudi Araya; Giuseppe Giglietti
- Starring: Thomas Kretschmann; Flavio Albanese; Jean-Marc Barr; Massimo Dapporto
- Cinematography: Bruno Cascio
- Edited by: Franco Fraticelli
- Music by: Pino Donaggio
- Release date: 1995
- Running time: 105 minutes
- Country: Italy
- Language: Italian

Marching in Darkness (Italian: Marciando nel buio) is a 1995 drama film co-written and directed by Massimo Spano. It premiered at the 52nd Venice International Film Festival.

== Plot ==
The recruit Saro Franzese befriends the sergeant of his squad, Gianni Tricarico, who becomes infatuated with him. Saro doesn't understand Gianni's advances, however the two start spending time together.

After a night at a dance club, a frustrated Gianni drives Saro to a road frequented by transsexual sex workers, reveals he works there himself, and the two argue. Saro leaves accepting a ride from a stranger. After the driver unsuccessfully tries to buy sex from Saro, an hidden passenger emerges from the backseat to subdue and rape Saro. This passenger is Captain Silvio Roatta, commander of Saro's own battalion. Roatta is powerful, respected both in the military and in the local community, and is engaged with the mayor's daughter.

The attackers ditch a wounded Saro on a sidewalk. Gianni finds him and is distraught, but upon learning that Roatta was one of Saro's attackers, he tries to hide what happened. First he brings Saro to the infirmary, then to Paola's, Saro's married sister. With great difficulty Saro tells her what happened to him, and she's highly supportive.

Saro demands from Gianni the licence plate of the rapists' car he had jotted, and traces it to a car showroom where he recognizes the driver. It's Vittorio Scarpa, a car dealer who is heavily in debt and has a strained relationship with his wife and son. Scarpa and Roatta are reported to the police and Gianni is subpoenaed as a witness.

However, Roatta reassures Scarpa that he can force Gianni, who is under his command, not to testify. Saro is then reported for slander. After the trial starts, Paola confronts Gianni, but he states he won't testify against his captain. Once alone with Saro, after a heated argument, he confesses he was raped by bullies when he was thirteen.

The military have also started an inquiry, led by Captain Antonio Marsili. He first interrogates Saro, who confirms the accusation but is informed he has been subjected to proceedings for immoral conduct. Later Gianni is called to support the claim that, on the night of the alleged rape, he merely saw Saro leaving the base; Marsili asks him about his relationship with Saro, having once seen them playfully scuffle in the barracks, but gets no answer. Captain Marsili also summons a Carabiniere, who is uncertain about the dynamics of the whole incident, as he suspects that Saro was soliciting and does not actually believe a soldier could be raped.

Being back at the barracks, Saro is in danger of severe harm by his fellow soldiers. Gianni tries to warn him but Saro refuses to leave the base, so Gianni intentionally breaks his leg, sending him away to an hospital. Roatta taunts him for trying to protect Saro and being in love with him, and revokes all of Gianni's squad leaves. Marsili visits Saro, but the soldier refuses to tell him how the incident happened.

At Scarpa's hearing, his wife Gabriella unexpectedly bursts into tears, while his son refuses to lie for him, revealing that Scarpa is actually a sexual pervert, brutal, addicted to alcohol, and routinely violent with Gabriella. A Police search of the family's car dealership reveals Scarpa's “secret room” containing a large collection of porn, including child pornography. After the hearing, Roatta's fiancée demands an explanation, but he punches her. Scarpa informs Roatta that, should he be left alone to take the fall, he will testify against Roatta.

Roatta exerts more pressure on sergeant Tricarico, forcing the soldiers to undergo back-breaking night-time drills to turn Gianni's comrades against him. After receiving complaints from Corporal Cau, Roatta states the soldiers will have to "solve" the problem themselves.

Gianni remains silent about the trial's facts, but reveals to Marsili that Roatta's driver, the soldier Granelli, had a nervous breakdown and was discharged. After talking to Granelli, Marsili fears the accusations against Roatta are true and confronts him, but Roatta replies by comparing himself to a Spartan soldier having absolute power over his recruit, sex included. Disgusted, a disapponted Marsili tells him he will have him expelled from the army. However, the mayor reassures Roatta that Saro's lawyer is in his pocket and has stepped down.

Marsili hires a new lawyer for Saro. At the same time, Gianni is attacked and stabbed in the shower by three masked soldiers but Marsili, drawn by his screams, saves his life. Gianni finally tells him the whole story. The Captain gets what he needs to incriminate the rapists, but specifies that if Gianni confirms everything, he will be removed from the army. The sergeant agrees and, when he is left alone with Saro, apologizes and asks for a kiss, which he receives.

Scarpa is arrested. Roatta's superior officer demands his resignation from the army. In court, Gianni confirms everything he had previously confided in Marsili, including his activity of male prostitution. He and Saro part as friends. Roatta shows up at the trial in full combat uniform, salutes and commits suicide before the astonished judge.

== Cast ==
- Thomas Kretschmann as Sergeant Gianni Tricarico
- Flavio Albanese as Soldier Saro
- Jean-Marc Barr as Captain Silvio Roatta
- Massimo Dapporto as Vittorio Scarpa
- Ottavia Piccolo as Gabriella Scarpa
- Nicola Russo as Fabrizio Scarpa
- Roberto Citran as Captain Antonio Marsili
- Mariella Valentini as Paola Franzese
- Emilio Bonucci as Mario
- Franco Interlenghi as Mayor
- Bruno Corazzari as Colonel
- Antonella Fattori as Laura
- Giorgio Crisafi as Lawyer
- Fabrizio Pioda as Trane
- Lorenzo Di Pasqua as Corporal Cau
- Gabriella Saitta as Judge
- Riccardo Babbi as Soldier Granelli
- Mattia Sbragia as Carabiniere
- Maximilian Nisi as Luca

== Production ==
Marching in Darkness was the first film produced by Zeudi Araya. The film did not have any collaboration on the part of the Italian Army.
