= War Italian Style =

- Original American film poster
- Directed by: Luigi Scattini
- Written by: Castellano & Pipolo; Fulvio Lucisano
- Produced by: Fulvio Lucisano
- Starring: Buster Keaton; Franco Franchi; Ciccio Ingrassia
- Cinematography: Fausto Zuccoli
- Edited by: Renato Cinquini
- Music by: Piero Umiliani
- Distributed by: American International Pictures (US)
- Release date: December 2, 1965 (Italy)
- Running time: 85 minutes
- Country: Italy
- Language: Italian

Due marines e un generale (translated: Two Marines and a General, internationally released as War Italian Style) is a 1965 Italian comedy film directed by Luigi Scattini. The film puts together the famous Italian comic duo Franco and Ciccio, and the silent cinema icon Buster Keaton.

The Keaton role is a mute role, except for the words "Thank you" that he pronounces in the final scene of the film.

== Plot ==
Two US Marines who are so incompetent that they are sent to the European Theatre of Operations end up in the Battle of Anzio where they face the Germans' giant artillery piece "Anzio Annie".

== Cast ==
- Franco Franchi as Frank
- Ciccio Ingrassia as Joe
- Buster Keaton as Gen. von Kassler
- Martha Hyer as Lt. Inge Schultze
- Fred Clark as Gen. Zacharias
- Barbara Lory as Inger
- Franco Ressel as Col. Jaeger
- Renato Chiantoni as Uncle Luigi
- Lino Banfi as German Soldier

== Production ==
The script based largely on I cannoni di Anzio ('The Cannons of Anzio'), an unrealized project by Luigi Comencini written by Luciano Vincenzoni. All of Buster Keaton's scenes were written by Vittorio Vighi, who was eventually credited only as dialogue supervisor. According to Ciccio Ingrassia, Keaton directed the scenes in which he appeared.

== Reception ==
The film is generally regarded as a missed opportunity, with much of the blame falling on director Scattini, who had little aptitude for comedy. Film historian Andrea Pergolari noted how "there is a clear attempt to do something different", "throughout the film, we keep waiting for a spark to ignite between the three comedians, but it never comes", and the film leaves the viewers "with a sense of discomfort and frustration".
