= Alfio Contini =

Italian cinematographer (1927–2020)

- Born: 19 September 1927; Rosignano Marittimo, Tuscany, Italy
- Died: 23 March 2020 (aged 92); Rome, Italy
- Occupation: Cinematographer
- Notable work: March on Rome; The Trojan Women; The Night Porter; Beyond the Clouds; Ripley's Game

Alfio Contini (19 September 1927 – 23 March 2020) was an Italian cinematographer who collaborated with film directors such as Dino Risi (Il sorpasso, 1962; La marcia su Roma, 1963), Pasquale Festa Campanile (La matriarca, 1968), Lucio Fulci, Liliana Cavani (Galileo, 1968; The Night Porter 1974; Ripley's Game, 2002), and Michelangelo Antonioni (Zabriskie Point, 1970; Beyond the Clouds, 1995). In 1996, he won the David di Donatello for Best Cinematography award for his work on Beyond the Clouds.
