= Degueyo =

1966 film

- Directed by: Giuseppe Vari
- Screenplay by: Roberto Amoroso; Giuseppe Vari; Sergio Garrone
- Story by: Sergio Garrone
- Starring: Giacomo Rossi Stuart; Dan Vadis; Dana Ghia
- Cinematography: Silvano Ippoliti
- Edited by: Giuseppe Vari
- Music by: Alessandro Derewitsky
- Production company: Garfilm
- Distributed by: Indipendenti Regionali
- Release date: 1966
- Country: Italy

Degueyo (also known as De Guello, Deguejo and Deguello) is a 1966 Italian Spaghetti Western film directed by Giuseppe Vari.

== Plot ==
Norman returns to Danger City seeking revenge for the death of his father. The bandit Ramon and his men are responsible. But in the town there are only women. Ramon in fact has killed most of the men and kidnapped the others: he hopes to obtain the necessary information to find a treasure hidden by an ex confederate officer.

== Cast ==
- Giacomo Rossi-Stuart: Norman Sandel
- Dan Vadis: Ramon
- Rosy Zichel: Rosy
- Dana Ghia: Jenny Slader
- Riccardo Garrone: Foran
- José Torres: Logan
- Giuseppe Addobbati: Colonel Clark
- Daniele Vargas: Frank
- Erika Blanc: Woman of Danger City
- Aurora Bautista: Woman of Danger City
- Silvana Jachino

== Citations ==
- Grant, Kevin (2011). Any Gun Can Play. Fab Press. ISBN 9781903254615.
