= Chrysanthemums for a Bunch of Swine =

1968 film by Sergio Pastore

- Directed by: Sergio Pastore
- Screenplay by: Sergio Pastore; Gianni Manera; Dino Santoni
- Starring: Edmund Purdom
- Cinematography: Tino Santoni
- Music by: Piero Umiliani
- Release date: 1968
- Country: Italy

Chrysanthemums for a Bunch of Swine (Original title: Crisantemi per un branco di carogne) is a 1968 Italian western film directed by Sergio Pastore. The script was co-written by Pastore, Gianni Manera and Dino Santoni. The film is Pastore's only Western.

== Plot ==
A gang of outlaws abducts a bride from her wedding celebration. They head to a monastery, where the bandit heading the gang tries to marry the girl. The priest refuses to solemnize the marriage without the girl's consent. When the gang leaves the monastery with the girl, the priest pursues them and picks off the gang members one by one.

== Cast ==
- Edmund Purdom
- Gianni Manera (credited as John Manera)
- Marilena Possenti
- Joseph Logan
- Livio Lorenzon
- Giovanna Lenzi (as Jeannette Len)
- Aïché Nanà
- Ivano Davoli

== Reception ==
The film, "like various other films by Pastore, received a very limited theatrical release and attracted very few spectators".

== Survival status ==
The only evidences of the film's existence today are its posters, lobby cards and soundtrack (composed by Piero Umiliani) as no remaining copy is known, thus being considered a lost film.

== Soundtrack ==
The film's original music was released by Beat Records in 2012.
