= Knives of the Avenger =

1966 film directed by Mario Bava

The Knives of the Avenger
- Original Italian film poster
- Italian: I coltelli del vendicatore
- Directed by: Mario Bava
- Screenplay by: Mario Bava; Alberto Liberati; Giorgio Simonelli
- Produced by: Pasquale Tagliaferri
- Starring: Cameron Mitchell; Fausto Tozzi; Giacomo Rossi Stuart; Elissa Pichelli
- Cinematography: Antonio Rinaldi; Mario Bava
- Edited by: Otello Clangeli
- Music by: Marcello Giombini
- Production company: Sider Film
- Distributed by: P. T. Cinematografica (Italy)
- Release date: 30 May 1966 (Italy)
- Running time: 85 minutes
- Country: Italy
- Language: Italian

Knives of the Avenger (Italian: I coltelli del vendicatore) is 1966 Italian sword-and-sandal film directed and co-written by Mario Bava. It stars Cameron Mitchell, Fausto Tozzi, Elissa Pichelli and Giacomo Rossi Stuart. Mitchell plays a mysterious, knife-throwing Viking warrior who protects a peasant woman and her young son from a despot.

Bava entered production when it was already falling apart and re-wrote and shot the film in six days. It was released in Italy on 30 May 1966. Film historian Tim Lucas described Knives of the Avenger as a remake of the Western film Shane in a Viking setting.

== Cast ==
- Cameron Mitchell as Ator / 'Helmut' (Note: Called 'Rurik' in some versions.)
- Fausto Tozzi as Hagen
- Giacomo Rossi Stuart as Harald
- Elissa Pichelli as Karin
- Luciano Polletin as Moki
- Amedeo Trilli as Viking Leader
- Renato Terra as Hagen's henchman

== Production ==
Knives of the Avenger was a troubled production originally directed by Leopoldo Savona. Mario Bava entered into the production to complete it, rewriting and reshooting the film and finishing the production in six days. Bava was credited under the pseudonym 'John Hold'. The film was shot at Titanus Studios in Rome.

== Release ==
Knives of the Avenger was released theatrically in Italy on 30 May 1966. It received a theatrical release in the United States in January 1968.

The film was released on DVD by Image Entertainment on 26 June 2001. It was released on Blu-Ray by Kino Lorber as part of their 'Mario Bava Collection'.

== Reception ==
Stuart Byron of Variety declared the film "a real surprise: a beautifully designed and exciting Viking tale from pseudonymous Mario Bava. Only subject and cast make this a programmer - but it's a top one."

== See also ==
- List of Italian films of 1966
