= Ring Around the World =

- Directed by: Luigi Scattini; Georges Combret
- Written by: Ernesto Gastaldi
- Produced by: Mino Loy; Luciano Martino
- Starring: Richard Harrison; Hélène Chanel
- Cinematography: Claudio Racca
- Music by: Piero Umiliani
- Release date: 1966
- Language: Italian

Ring Around the World (Italian: Duello nel mondo, French: Duel dans le monde) is a 1966 Italian-French Eurospy spy thriller written and directed by Luigi Scattini (here credited as Arthur Scott) and starring Richard Harrison.

The French director Georges Combret is credited as co-director but he only shot a few scenes of the film. Several scenes were originally shot in Hong Kong but due to production issues they were unusable and had to be re-shot in Rome.

== Plot ==
An insurance company hires Fred Lester to investigate the many mysterious deaths of heavily insured clients, who were killed with chemical bullets fired from an air pistol.

== Cast ==
- Richard Harrison as Fred Lester
- Hélène Chanel as Mary Brightford
- Giacomo Rossi Stuart as The Hitman
- Dominique Boschero as Yo-Yo
- Bernard Blier as Lord Richard Berry
- José Lewgoy
- Silvio Bagolini
