= Giacomo Rossi Stuart =

Italian actor (1925–1994)

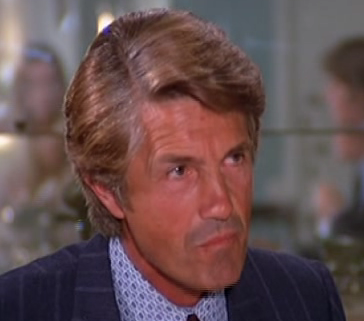
- Stuart in La minorenne (1974)
- Born: 25 August 1925; Todi, Umbria, Italy
- Died: 20 October 1994 (aged 69); Rome, Lazio, Italy
- Other name: Jack Stuart
- Occupation: Actor
- Years active: 1953–1993
- Spouse: Klara Müller
- Children: 4; including Kim

Giacomo Rossi Stuart (25 August 1925 – 20 October 1994) was an Italian actor, who appeared in nearly 100 film and television series between 1953 and 1989. He was the father of actor Kim Rossi Stuart.

== Life and career ==
Born in Todi to an Italian father and a Scottish mother, Stuart was a highly successful athlete when young; he competed in the pentathlon. After getting interested in acting, he studied at Actors Studio in New York City.

Some of his earliest roles included the "Hollywood on the Tiber" films War and Peace (1956), A Farewell to Arms (1957), and Five Branded Women (1960). Between 1956 and 1957, he played a recurring role on the Buster Crabbe-starring American television series Captain Gallant of the Foreign Legion, which was filmed in Italy.

Between the late 1950s and the late 1970s he was a major actor in Italian genre cinema, playing both leading and supporting roles. He worked with such directors as Mario Bava (Knives of the Avenger, Kill, Baby, Kill), Riccardo Freda (Caltiki - The Immortal Monster), Antonio Margheriti, Umberto Lenzi, Sergio Corbucci, and Joe D'Amato. He was sometimes billed as Jack Stuart.

== Personal life ==
Stuart was married to model Klara Müller. They had four children, including actor Kim (b. 1969), actress Loretta, and stuntwoman Valentina (b. 1978).

=== Death ===
Stuart died in Rome on 20 October 1994, at the age of 69.

== Filmography ==
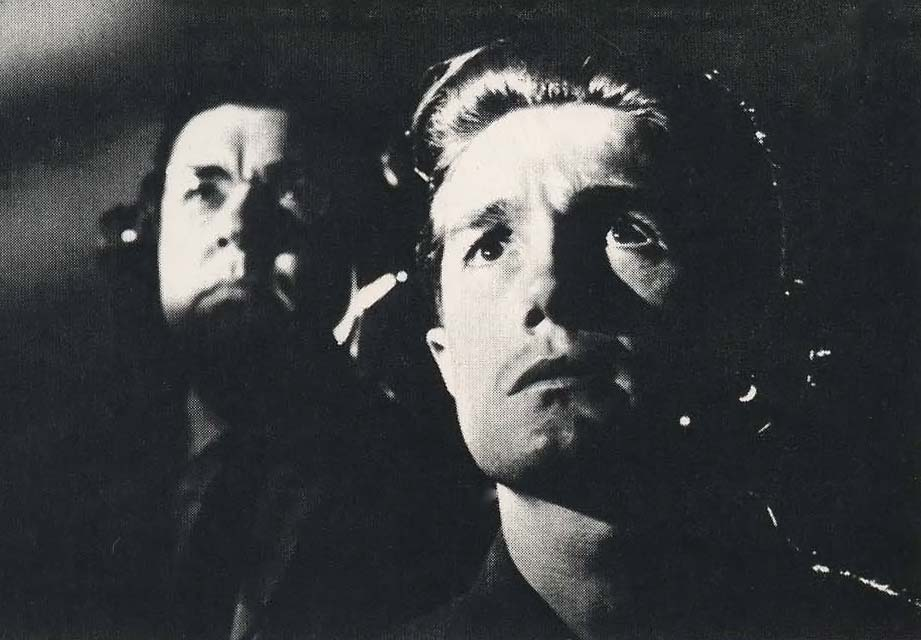
Stuart (right) in The Day the Sky Exploded (1958).

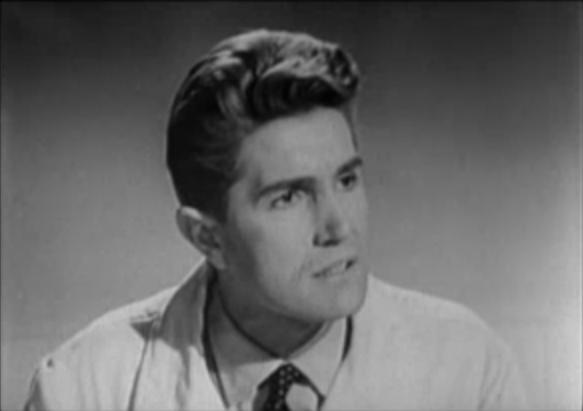
In The Last Man on Earth (1964).

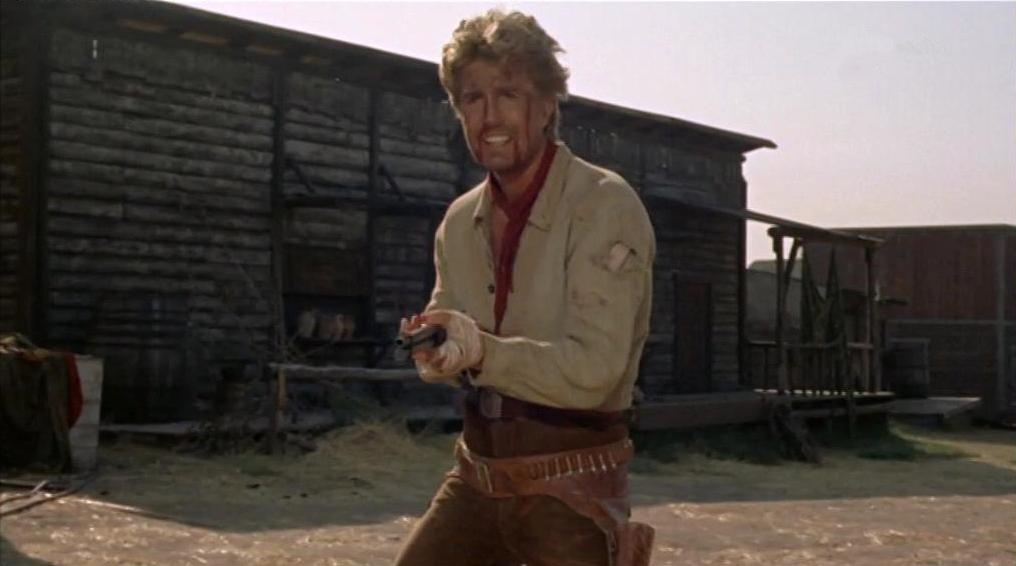
In Degueyo (1966).

=== Film ===
Year	Title	Role	Notes
1953	Jeunes mariés		
1955	The Red Cloak		
1956	War and Peace	Young Cossack	Uncredited
1956	The House of Intrigue	Henry	
1957	A Farewell to Arms	Carabiniere	Uncredited
1958	The Silent Enemy	Rosati	
1958	Il Conte di Matera	Duke Paolo Bressi	
1958	The Day the Sky Exploded	Stuart	
1959	Knight Without a Country	Ruggero	
1959	Caltiki - The Immortal Monster	Arturo	
1959	La notte del grande assalto	Count Fabio	
1960	Five Branded Women	Petar	
1960	Slave of Rome	Claudius	
1962	Invasion 1700		
1962	Sodom and Gomorrah	Ishmael	
1962	The Reluctant Saint	Young Prelate	
1962	The Avenger	Euryalus	
1963	Catherine of Russia	Count Poniatowski	
1963	Zorro and the Three Musketeers	Athos	
1963	The Shortest Day	Austrian Soldier	Uncredited
1963	Gunfight at Red Sands	Sheriff Lance Corbett	
1963	I diavoli di Spartivento	Vannozzo Duchesca	
1964	Temple of the White Elephant	Lt. Reginald Milliner	
1964	The Last Man on Earth	Ben Cortman	
1964	Grand Canyon Massacre	Sheriff Burt Cooley	
1964	Seven Slaves Against the World	Gaius	
1964	La vendetta di Spartacus	Fulvius	
1964	Kidnapped to Mystery Island	Tremal Naik	
1964	I magnifici Brutos del West	Marshal Gary Smith	
1965	Duel at Sundown	Quents	
1966	Degueyo	Norman Sandel	
1966	Knives of the Avenger	Harald	
1966	Kill, Baby, Kill	Dr. Paul Eswai	
1966	War Between the Planets	Cmdr. Rod Jackson	
1966	Ring Around the World	The Killer	
1966	Perry Grant, agente di ferro	Roland	
1967	Snow Devils	Cmdr. Rod Jackson	
1967	The Glass Sphinx	Ray McCall	
1967	Occhio per occhio, dente per dente	Jeff Gordon	
1968	Ragan	Kohler	
1968	Zorro the Fox	Don Pedro	
1968	Colpo sensazionale al servizio del Sifar		
1968	Bloody Che Contra	Prado	
1969	The Battle of the Damned	Maj. Carter	
1969	Indovina chi viene a merenda?	Camp Commandant	
1969	The Five Man Army	Mexican Officer	
1969	Viaje al vacío	Gert Müller	
1970	El último día de la guerra	Pvt. Kendall	
1970	Rendezvous with Dishonour	Lt. Tibbitt	
1970	Churchill's Leopards	Maj. Powell	
1970	Hornets' Nest	Sgt. Schwalberg	
1970	The Weekend Murders	Ted Collins	
1971	Kill Django... Kill First	Johnny	
1971	The Double	Frank's Brother	
1971	Something Creeping in The Dark	Donald Forrest	
1971	The Night Evelyn Came Out of the Grave	Dr. Richard Timberlane	
1972	Ben and Charlie	Hawkins	
1972	Sei iellato, amico hai incontrato Sacramento	Tom Murdock	
1973	Sette scialli di seta gialla	Victor Morgan	
1973	La ragazza dalla pelle di luna	Giacomo	Also assistant director
1973	Super Bitch	Marco	
1973	The Lonely Woman	Richard Leighton	
1973	Death Smiles at a Murderer	Herbert von Ravensbrück	
1973	The Off-Road Girl	Giulio Morganti	
1973	The Fighting Fist of Shanghai Joe	Tricky the Gambler	
1974	Last Days of Mussolini	Capt. Jack Donati	
1974	La minorenne	Carlo Salvi	
1974	The Murri Affair	Riccardo Murri	
1975	The Bloodsucker Leads the Dance	Count Richard Marnack	
1975	Zorro	Kapitän Fritz von Markel	
1975	Reflections in Black	Anselmi	
1976	Emanuelle in Bangkok	Jimmy	
1976	Terror in Rome	Stefano's Father	
1976	Casanova & Co.	Marchese Coppafrata	Uncredited
1977	La notte dell'alta marea	Guide	Also screenwriter
1978	Blue Nude	Donovan	Also assistant director
1978	The Biggest Battle	U.S. Commando Leader	
1978	War of the Robots	Roger	
1978	Covert Action	Grant	
1979	7 ragazze di classe	Enrico Cavallari	
1979	Velvet Hands	Supervisor	Uncredited
1987	Tempi di guerra	Prof. Amundsen	
1989	Le porte dell'inferno	Dr. Johns	
1993	Venti dal Sud		

=== Television ===
Year	Title	Role	Notes
1956-57	Captain Gallant of the Foreign Legion	Sgt. Andre Rousseau	10 episodes
1959	The Flying Doctor		Episode: "The Secret"
1960	Tales of the Vikings	Rurik	Episode: "The Treasure"
1962	Più rosa che giallo	Bob Flamer	Episode: "Il secondo nodo scorsoio"
1974	Philo Vance	Pop Cleaver	Miniseries; 2 episodes
1975	Ritratto di signora	Caspar Goodwood	Miniseries; 4 episodes
1976	Rosso veneziano	Tullio Moscao	Miniseries; 3 episodes
1979	Return of the Saint	Scheffer	Episode: "Appointment in Florence"
1980	L'eredità della Priora	Gombi	Miniseries; 4 episodes
1983	L'amante dell'Orsa Maggiore	Il Chiodo	Miniseries; 4 episodes
