= Sergio Pastore =

Italian director and screenwriter

- Born: 1932; Cosenza, Calabria, Italy
- Died: 24 September, 1987 (aged 54–55); Rome, Lazio, Italy
- Occupation(s): Film director Screenwriter

Sergio Pastore (1932-1987) was an Italian director and screenwriter best known for the giallo film Crimes of the Black Cat (1972).

== Filmography ==
=== As director only ===
- La verità difficile (1968)
- Apocalisse di un terremoto (1982)
- Pin il monello (1982)
- La donna del mare (1984)
- I mercenari raccontano... (1985)

=== As director and writer ===
- Crisantemi per un branco di carogne (1968)
- Il diario proibito di Fanny (1969)
- Una ragazza di Praga (1969)
- 7 scialli di seta gialla (1972)
- Occhio alla vedova (1976)
- Amore inquieto di Maria (1986)
- Delitti (1987)
