= La ragazza dalla pelle di luna =

- Italian theatrical release poster
- Directed by: Luigi Scattini
- Written by: Mario Di Nardo; Luigi Scattini
- Cinematography: Antonio Borghesi
- Music by: Piero Umiliani
- Release date: 1973
- Language: Italian

La ragazza dalla pelle di luna (also known as Sex of Their Bodies, Moon Skin and The Sinner) is a 1973 Italian erotic drama film written and directed by Luigi Scattini. It marked the film debut of Zeudi Araya.

== Plot ==
Alberto, an engineer, and Helen, a magazine photographer, have been married for a few years, but their marriage is in crisis. Then they decide to take a trip to Seychelles, where they will betray one another.

== Cast ==
- Zeudi Araya as Simoa
- Ugo Pagliai as Alberto
- Beba Lončar as Helen
- Giacomo Rossi Stuart as Giacomo

== See also ==
- List of Italian films of 1973
