= Giovanni Simonelli =

Italian football manager

Personal information
- Date of birth: 23 October 1952 (age 74)
- Place of birth: Naples, Italy

Managerial career
- Years: Team
- 1981–1982: Saviano
- 1982–1983: B.Caivanese
- 1993–1996: Saviano
- 1984–1985: Palmese
- 1985–1986: B.Caivanese
- 1988–1989: Afragolese
- 1989–1990: Nola
- 1990–1991: Sangiuseppese
- 1991–1992: Salernitana
- 1992–1994: Sangiuseppese
- 1994–1995: Giulianova Calcio
- 1995–1996: Nola
- 1996–1997: Bisceglie
- 1997–1999: Nocerina
- 1999–2000: Catania
- 2000–2001: Ascoli
- 2001–2002: Taranto
- 2002–2004: Pisa
- 2004–2005: Pescara
- 2005–2006: Martina Franca
- 2006–2008: Benevento
- 2008–2011: Sorrento
- 2011–2011: Benevento

Giovanni Simonelli (born 23 October 1952) is an Italian professional football manager, who is currently out of work after a spell as manager of Benevento Calcio.

== Managerial career ==
After spending his much of his early year managing many of the minor clubs in Campania, Simonelli had spells managing in the Italian lower leagues including Serie C2 and Serie C1, but also Serie B with Pescara. He had his most successful period as manager of Sorrento where he took the club from a 12th finish place in the 2008–09 season to a second-place finish and a play-off semi final in the 2010–11 season. At the end of that season he rejoined his old club Benevento, but had his contract mutually terminated in November 2011.
