= Sweden: Heaven and Hell =

- Directed by: Luigi Scattini
- Written by: Luigi Scattini
- Produced by: Mario Borghi
- Narrated by: Enrico Maria Salerno
- Cinematography: Claudio Racca
- Edited by: Luigi Scattini
- Music by: Piero Umiliani
- Production companies: Caravel Film; Embassy Pictures; Produzioni Atlas Consorziate
- Distributed by: Produzioni Atlas Consorziate
- Release date: 4 September 1968
- Running time: 90 minutes
- Country: Italy
- Languages: Italian; English; Swedish

Sweden: Heaven and Hell (Italian: Svezia, inferno e paradiso) is a 1968 Italian mondo film directed, written and edited by Luigi Scattini. It features actress Marie Liljedahl and is narrated by Enrico Maria Salerno, while the English dub is provided by British actor Edmund Purdom, and the French version by Jean Topart.

The film is made up of nine segments focusing on different aspects of sexuality in Sweden, such as lesbian nightclubs, pornography, the swinging lifestyle of married couples, and the sex education of teenagers. It also examines drug addiction, alcoholism, and suicides in Sweden.

The film is best remembered as featuring the debut of the song "Mah Nà Mah Nà" by Piero Umiliani, which was popularized by The Muppets after its original release.

== Plot ==
=== Heaven ===
The film highlights Sweden's progressive 1960s culture, focusing on what was then considered radical openness. Segments depict the state-mandated sex education for teenagers, the availability of contraceptives, and the rise of day-care for working mothers. It also explores urban subcultures like sauna, nightclubs and free lifestyles, framing these as peaks of personal freedom. One of the most famous "heavenly" scenes features a group of women in a sauna, set to the debut of Piero Umiliani's iconic song "Mah Nà Mah Nà".

=== Hell ===
The narrative often shifts to condemn these freedoms, attributing them to a rise in social ills. The "hell" segments focus on high rates of alcoholism, drug addiction, and the country's reputation as a "suicide capital". This is captured through darker, usually staged, scenarios: rebellious, teenage biker gangs who spread violence and disorder, depicted gang raping a young girl, a reformatory school for juvenile delinquents, and even a massive nuclear bunker designed for survival in an inevitable nuclear armageddon. The narrator, voiced by Edmund Purdom in the English version, offers a condescending critique, suggesting that the Swedes' detachment and boredom with their liberal lives inevitably leads to despair and self-destruction.
