= Mark Shoots First =

- Directed by: Stelvio Massi
- Screenplay by: Dardano Scchetti; Teodoro Corra; Raniero Di Giovanbattista; Stelvio Massi
- Story by: Dardano Sacchetti
- Starring: Franco Gasparri; Lee J. Cobb; Nino Benvenuti
- Cinematography: Federico Zanni
- Edited by: Mauro Bonanni
- Music by: Adriano Fabi
- Production company: P.A.C.
- Distributed by: P.A.C.
- Release date: 22 December 1975 (Italy)
- Running time: 100 minutes
- Country: Italy
- Box office: ₤1.227 billion

Mark il poliziotto spara per primo (internationally released as Mark Shoots First) is an Italian poliziottesco film directed in 1975 by Stelvio Massi. It is the sequel of Mark il poliziotto.

== Cast ==
- Franco Gasparri: Mark Terzi
- Lee J. Cobb: commendator Benzi
- Massimo Girotti: vice questore Spaini
- Ely Galleani: Angela Frizzo
- Nino Benvenuti: Ghini
- Andrea Aureli: giornalista
- Spiros Focás: Morini
- Guido Celano: Mario Borelli

== Release ==
Mark Shoots First was released theatrically in Italy on 22 December 1975 where it was distributed by P.A.C. (Produzioni Atlas Cinematografica). The film grossed ₤1.227 billion Italian lira in Italy.
