= Luigi Scattini =

Italian film director and screenwriter

- Born: 17 May 1927; Turin, Kingdom of Italy
- Died: 12 July 2010 (aged 83); Rome, Italy
- Occupation: Film director
- Children: Monica Scattini

Luigi Scattini (17 May 1927 – 12 July 2010) was an Italian film director and screenwriter.

Scattini graduated in law, then he began his career as a journalist and a film critic for several weekly magazines such as Gente and Oggi. In the 1960s he entered the cinema industry as a director of ephemeral films and mondo documentaries. He also directed several feature films, including the comedy War Italian Style with Buster Keaton. He was also active as a producer, a film editor and a dubbing director. He was the father of the actress Monica Scattini.

== Selected filmography ==
- Primitive Love (1964)
- War Italian Style (1966)
- Ring Around the World (1966)
- The Glass Sphinx (1967)
- Sweden: Heaven and Hell (1968)
- La ragazza dalla pelle di luna (1972)
- The Off-Road Girl (1973)
- The Body (1974)
- Twilight of Love (1977)
