= Fantozzi =

Fantozzi may refer to:

== Fictional characters ==
- Ugo Fantozzi, a fictional character appearing in Italian literature and film, created by Paolo Villaggio.

== People ==
- Augusto Fantozzi (1940–2019), Italian lawyer, tax expert, academic, businessman and politician

== Films ==
- Fantozzi (film), a 1975 Italian satirical cult film
- Fantozzi - Il ritorno, a 1996 Italian comedy film
- Fantozzi 2000 – La clonazione, a 1999 Italian comedy film
- Fantozzi alla riscossa, a 1990 Italian comedy film
- Fantozzi contro tutti, a 1980 Italian comedy film
- Fantozzi in paradiso, a 1993 Italian comedy film
- Fantozzi subisce ancora, a 1983 Italian comedy film
- Fantozzi va in pensione, a 1988 Italian comedy film
- Il secondo tragico Fantozzi, a 1976 Italian comedy film

== See also ==
- PalaFantozzi, an indoor sporting arena in Capo d'Orlando, Italy
