= Ennio Antonelli (actor) =

Italian actor and boxer (1927–2004)

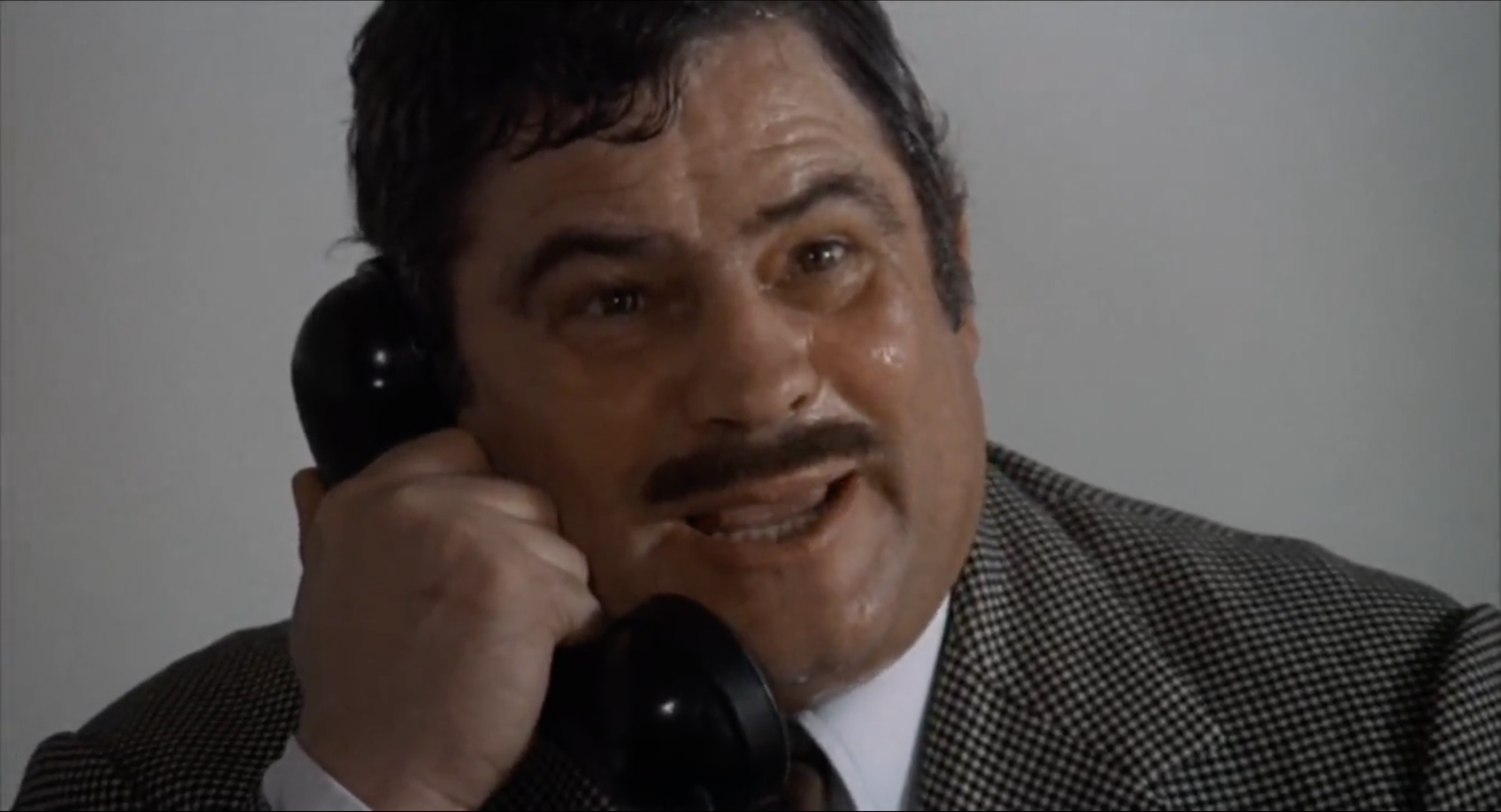
- Antonelli in The Scientific Cardplayer (1972)
- Born: 23 January 1927; Rome, Italy
- Died: 6 August 2004 (aged 77); Rome, Italy
- Occupation: Actor
- Years active: 1961–1991

Ennio Antonelli (23 January 1927 – 6 August 2004) was an Italian actor and former boxer. He appeared in more than one hundred films from 1961 to 1991.

== Filmography ==
Year	Title	Role	Notes
1963	Jason and the Argonauts	Dmitrius	Uncredited
1963	Vino, whisky e acqua salata		
1964	Castle of the Living Dead	Gianni	
1964	Sword of the Empire	Roman Christian	
1965	War Italian Style	von Kassler's Driver	
1966	The She Beast	Truck Driver	
1966	Agent 3S3: Massacre in the Sun	Man on Plane	
1966	Europa canta	Joe	
1966	Dr. Goldfoot and the Girl Bombs	Goldfoot Henchman	Uncredited
1967	Requiescant	Brothel Visitor	Uncredited
1967	Matchless		
1967	Bang Bang Kid	Councilman	
1968	Danger: Diabolik	Syndicate Member	Uncredited
1968	3 Supermen a Tokyo	Samurai	Uncredited
1968	Madigan's Millions	Basilio	
1968	Be Sick... It's Free	Callisto Cecconi	Uncredited
1968	Buona Sera, Mrs. Campbell	Hotel Concierge	Uncredited
1969	Bootleggers	Baymond's Right Hand	
1969	Fellini Satyricon	Muscled Man at Feast	Uncredited
1970	The Divorce	Motorcyclist	
1970	Basta guardarla		
1971	La supertestimone	Un testimone	Uncredited
1971	Riuscirà l'avvocato Franco Benenato a sconfiggere il suo acerrimo nemico il pretore Ciccio De Ingras?	Barista	
1971	Scipio the African	Servo di Scipione	
1971	Blindman	Mexican Officer	Uncredited
1971	Il provinciale		
1972	The Assassin of Rome		
1975	The Sunday Woman	Zavattaro	
1976	Colpita da improvviso benessere	Fish vendor	
1976	Down and Dirty	Oste	
1976	Febbre da cavallo	Otello Rinaldi, the butcher, 'Manzotin'	
1978	Brothers Till We Die	Osvaldo Albanese	
1978	Quando c'era lui... caro lei!	Fat Fascist	
1979	Neapolitan Mystery		
1979	La patata bollente		
1980	Arrivano i gatti	Er Braciola	
1980	Il lupo e l'agnello	Ladro	
1980	Rag. Arturo De Fanti bancario-precario		Uncredited
1980	The Warning		
1980	Fantozzi contro tutti	Zio Antunello, il fornaio	
1980	Mi faccio la barca		
1980	Il ficcanaso		
1980	Il casinista	Detenuto	
1981	Una vacanza bestiale	Camionista	
1981	Manolesta		
1981	Quando la coppia scoppia	Attendant at 'Ara Pacis'	Uncredited
1981	Uno contro l'altro, praticamente amici	Cicerchia	
1981	I carabbinieri	Provolone	
1981	Una vacanza del cactus		
1981	Sogni d'oro	Gigio's Assistant	
1981	Pierino contro tutti	Cliente Taverna	Uncredited
1981	Miracoloni	Suora	
1981	Fracchia la belva umana	Cameriere	
1981	Culo e camicia	The Grocer	
1981	Pierino medico della Saub	Zio Nando	
1981	A Policewoman in New York		
1982	Pierino la peste alla riscossa!	Contadino	
1982	Don't Play with Tigers	Truck Driver	
1982	Eccezzziunale... veramente	Venditore di lupini	
1982	W la foca	First Ticket Collector	
1982	Vieni avanti cretino	Carmine Carlucci	
1982	Scusa se è poco		
1982	Porca vacca		
1982	Delitto sull'autostrada	Allenatore	
1982	Sogni mostruosamente proibiti	Uomo in macchina	
1982	È forte un casino!	Benzinaio	
1983	Time for Loving	Morino	
1983	Pappa e ciccia	'Marchese'	(first story)
1983	Sapore di mare 2 - Un anno dopo	Morino	
1983	Fantozzi subisce ancora	Pizzettaro di Via della Scrofa	
1983	Sfrattato cerca casa equo canone	Custode delle case popolari	
1983	Warrior of the Lost World	Trucker	
1983	Due strani papà	Postino	
1983	Al bar dello sport	Bodyguard of Don Raffaele	
1984	Crime in Formula One	Osvaldo Bonanni, gardener	
1984	Dance music		
1984	Good King Dagobert	Courtier de Dagobert	
1984	L'allenatore nel pallone		
1984	Mi faccia causa		
1985	I pompieri	Signor Gentilini	
1986	Detective School Dropouts	Little Ricky	
1986	Scuola di ladri	Finto prete	
1986	Grandi magazzini	Magazziniere	
1988	Fantozzi va in pensione	Maschera del cinema porno	
1990	Le comiche	Pizzettaro	
1991	Piedipiatti	Compagno di cella di 'er Soffia'	(final film role)
