= Paolo Paoloni =

Italian actor (1929–2019)

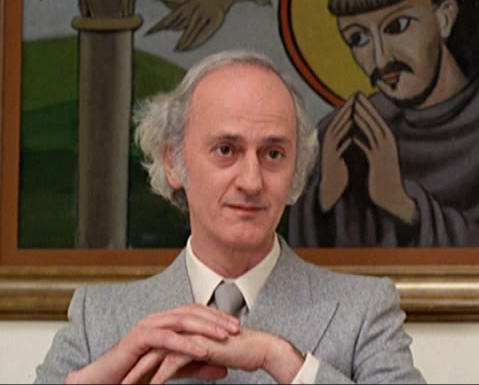
- Paolo Paoloni in Fantozzi
- Born: 24 July 1929; Bodio, Switzerland
- Died: 9 January 2019 (aged 89); Rome, Italy
- Occupation: Actor
- Years active: 1968–2019
- Height: 1.86 m (6 ft 1 in)

Paolo Paoloni (24 July 1929 – 9 January 2019) was an Italian actor.

== Biography ==
A close friend of director Luciano Salce, Paoloni is best known for portraying the role of the Galactic Mega-director in the Fantozzi film saga. Despite being famous for taking part to several comedies, Paoloni took also part in some horror films such as Cannibal Holocaust.

He died on 9 January 2019, at the age of 89. In his final months, Paoloni became mute due to a vocal cord disease.

== Selected filmography ==
- The Black Sheep (1968) - The Chairman of 'Banca di Sconto' (uncredited)
- Il Prof. Dott. Guido Tersilli, primario della clinica Villa Celeste, convenzionata con le mutue (1969) - Lampredi
- La ragazza del prete (1970)
- In the Name of the Italian People (1971) - Psychiatrist
- The Nun and the Devil (1973) - Isabella's keeper (uncredited)
- Erotomania (1974) - Tappatani
- Fantozzi (1975) - Duke Count Maria Rita Vittorio Balabam
- White Horses of Summer (1975) - Infermiere
- Il secondo tragico Fantozzi (1976) - Mega Direttore Galattico Duca Conte G.M.Balabam
- Tutti possono arricchire tranne i poveri (1976) - Autista
- L'altra metà del cielo (1977) - Vescovo di Sidney
- An Average Little Man (1977) - Impiegato allampanato
- Grazie tante - Arrivederci (1977)
- Where Are You Going on Holiday? (1978) - Agente dei Lloyd's (segment "Sì buana")
- Dr. Jekyll Likes Them Hot (1979) - Professor
- Tesoro mio (1979)
- Cannibal Holocaust (1980) - 3rd Executive
- Inferno (1980) - Music Teacher
- The Precarious Bank Teller (1980) - Il conte Ernesto Di Sacrofano
- Il Marchese del Grillo (1981) - Captain of the Swiss Guards (uncredited)
- Vieni avanti cretino (1982) - The Office Manager
- And the Ship Sails On (1983) - Il Maestro Albertini
- Il mistero del panino assassino (1987) - Portiere d'albergo (uncredited)
- Quelli del casco (1988) - Maitre
- Stradivari (1988) - Moroni
- Io, Peter Pan (1989) - Dentist
- The Miser (1990) - Il papa
- The King's Whore (1990) - Longhi's Lackey
- Stasera a casa di Alice (1990) - Monsignore Rocca-Bandini
- Vacanze di Natale '90 (1990) - Il padre di Eliette
- Voices from Beyond (1991) - Grandfather Mainardi
- Vacanze di Natale '91 (1991) - Signor Martelli
- Faccione (1991) - the gynecologist (uncredited)
- Fantozzi in paradiso (1993) - Megadirettore
- Chicken Park (1994) - Scientist (uncredited)
- Fantozzi - Il ritorno (1996) - Mega Direttore Galattico Duca Conte G.M.Balabam
- Double Team (1997) - Old Monk
- L'amico di Wang (1997) - Il giudice
- Dirty Linen (1999) - Farmacista
- Fantozzi 2000 – La clonazione (1999) - Mega Presidente, Duca Conte G.M.Balabam
- Laguna (2001) - Vincenzo
- Winter (2002) - Eddy
- Il nostro matrimonio è in crisi (2002) - Gavazzi Lui
- Ripley's Game (2002) - Franco
- The Haunting of Helena (2012) - Ferri
- Si accettano miracoli (2015) - (uncredited)
- La voce di Fantozzi (2017) - Himself
- Blessed Madness (2018) - Padre Martinez (final film role)
