= I Won the New Year's Lottery =

- Italian: Ho vinto la lotteria di Capodanno
- Directed by: Neri Parenti
- Written by: Alessandro Bencivenni; Leonardo Benvenuti; Piero De Bernardi; Neri Parenti; Domenico Saverni
- Produced by: Mario Cecchi Gori; Vittorio Cecchi Gori
- Starring: Paolo Villaggio
- Cinematography: Sandro D'Eva
- Edited by: Sergio Montanari
- Music by: Bruno Zambrini
- Distributed by: Penta
- Release date: 1989
- Running time: 90 minutes
- Country: Italy
- Language: Italian
- Box office: $5.7 million (Italy)

I Won the New Year's Lottery (Italian: Ho vinto la lotteria di Capodanno) is a 1989 Italian comedy film directed by Neri Parenti. It was one of the highest-grossing Italian films of the year.

== Cast ==
- Paolo Villaggio as Paolo Ciottoli
- Antonio Allocca as Rossi
- Camillo Milli as The Blindman
- Giampaolo Saccarola as The Boss
- Margit Evelyn Newton as Arcangela
- Ugo Bologna as The Editor of The Newspaper
- Giulio Massimini as Don Paolino
- Valerio Merola as Himself
- Giancarlo Magalli as Himself
