= Fracchia la belva umana =

1981 film

- Italian theatrical release poster
- Directed by: Neri Parenti
- Written by: Leo Benvenuti, Piero De Bernardi, Paolo Villaggio, Neri Parenti
- Produced by: Bruno Altissimi, Claudio Saraceni
- Starring: Paolo Villaggio, Lino Banfi, Gigi Reder, Anna Mazzamauro, Massimo Boldi
- Cinematography: Alberto Spagnoli
- Edited by: Sergio Montanari
- Music by: Fred Bongusto
- Distributed by: Cecchi Gori Group
- Release date: 22 December 1981
- Running time: 99 minutes
- Country: Italy
- Language: Italian

Fracchia la belva umana, also known as Fracchia the Fanatic or Fracchia the Human Beast, is a 1981 Italian comedy film directed by Neri Parenti. The film is loosely inspired by The Whole Town's Talking. It was screened at the 67th Venice International Film Festival as an Italian comedy. Its cast includes: Paolo Villaggio, Lino Banfi and the then young Massimo Boldi and Francesco Salvi.

== Plot ==
Giandomenico Fracchia is a shy and meek employee in a confectionery company, who suffers repeated bullying from his boss Dr. Orimbelli, his colleagues, and even from his neighbors and cleaning lady. While on a date with reluctant coworker Miss Corvino, Fracchia is repeatedly arrested, questioned and abused by the Police, DIGOS and Carabinieri, on the suspicion of being a violent and ruthless international public enemy, known only by his nickname "The Human Beast", whose exact likeness is shared by Fracchia.

Realizing the striking resemblance, the lawmen provide Fracchia with a pass to attest to his identity. However, the real Human Beast, who has been tailing Fracchia, breaks into his apartment, extorts his pass and sets up base in his house, ordering that the pair never be away from home at the same time. While plotting a bank robbery, the Beast takes Fracchia's place at work, ultimately subduing Orimbelli and Miss Corvino. Due to an announced strike, the Beast's accomplices decide to hit the bank earlier than planned, but they inadvertently collect Fracchia, instead of the Beast, to lead the operation. Despite Fracchia's clumsiness, the heist succeeds.

Police commissioner Auricchio devises a plan to force the Beast out of hiding by leveraging his devotion to his elderly and overprotective mother, luring him to a clinic where she is being treated. However, he mistakenly communicates his plan to the Beast, who has been posing as Fracchia and decides to send the latter to the rendezvous, confident that Fracchia will be killed or imprisoned, thus clearing the Beast of all suspicion. Fracchia does as told as the Beast follows closely behind. The trap is sprung, but Auricchio's plan is botched by the Carabinieri, who arrive on the scene to secure the criminal for themselves. In the commotion, both Fracchia and the Beast are fatally shot.

Arriving in the afterlife together, Fracchia and the Beast discover that the celestial gatekeeper is also relying on Fracchia's pass to identify each: as the Beast, who is still in possession of the pass, is sent to heaven, Fracchia descends into hell as he decries the unfairness of particular judgment.

== Cast ==
- Paolo Villaggio as Giandomenico Fracchia / The Human Beast
- Lino Banfi as Commissioner Auricchio
- Anna Mazzamauro as Miss Corvino
- Gigi Reder as The Human Beast's mother
- Gianni Agus as Dr. Orimbelli
- Sandro Ghiani as De Simone
- Roberto Della Casa as Tino
- Massimo Boldi as Pera
- Francesco Salvi as Neuro
- Antonio Allocca as Carabinieri Marshal
- Renzo Rinaldi as Carabinieri Colonel
- Ugo Bologna as bank director
- Renato Cecchetto as DIGOS' Chief
- Jole Silvani as Palmira (as Iole Silvani)
- Fiammetta Baralla as chubby girl doing jogging
- Giulio Farnese as afterworld's gatekeeper

== Production ==
It was the first of the two films about Fracchia, a character created by Paolo Villaggio, along with the most famous Ugo Fantozzi. Despite being published six years after Fantozzi, and pulling many gags from Fantozzi's movies, the film was a success and became a cult movie. Many gags from the movie became famous, such as the bean bag scene, and defined the typical repertoire of Paolo Villaggio (right in this film was introduced at the cinema the famous joke «Com'è umano lei!» («How humane you are!») was first born on TV).

Among the characters the noteworthy performances are: Gigi Reder who plays the mother of "The Human Beast" and Anna Mazzamauro who plays the lover of "The Human Beast" (whose love is not reciprocate by Fracchia). Honorary mentions are: two youth Massimo Boldi and Francesco Salvi playing as accomplices of "The Human Beast". Memorables scenes are the gags between the Chief of Police Commissario Auricchio (Lino Banfi) and his subordinate Appuntato De Simone (Sandro Ghiani).
