= Pappa e ciccia =

- Italian theatrical release poster by Enzo Sciotti
- Directed by: Neri Parenti
- Written by: Leonardo Benvenuti; Piero De Bernardi; Franco Marotta; Laura Toscano; Paolo Villaggio; Gianni Manganelli; Neri Parenti
- Starring: Lino Banfi; Paolo Villaggio; Milly Carlucci
- Cinematography: Alberto Spagnoli
- Edited by: Sergio Montanari
- Music by: Bruno Zambrini
- Release date: 14 April 1983
- Running time: 98 min
- Country: Italy
- Language: Italian

Pappa e ciccia (also known as Two of a Kind) is a 1983 Italian comedy film directed by Neri Parenti.

== Plot ==
First segment: Nicola Calore, an Apulian mason who emigrated in Switzerland, faces the visit of his niece Rosina who believes that he has become wealthy.

Second segment: the misadventures that occurred to two surveyors during their stay in a holiday village in Kenya.

== Cast ==
- Lino Banfi: Nicola Calore / Capitano Tombale
- Paolo Villaggio: Geometra / Infermiera
- Milly Carlucci: Rosina Calore / Claudia
- Jacques Herlin: Herr Schmidt
- Pippo Santonastaso: Guido Colzi
- Marina Confalone: Antonia
- Antonio Allocca: Pino
- Roberto Della Casa: Goffredo
