= La locandiera (film) =

- Directed by: Paolo Cavara
- Written by: Carlo Goldoni (play); Leo Benvenuti; Piero De Bernardi; Lucia Dembry
- Starring: Claudia Mori; Adriano Celentano; Paolo Villaggio; Marco Messeri; Gianni Cavina; Lorenza Guerrieri; Milena Vukotic
- Cinematography: Mario Vulpiani
- Edited by: Angelo Curi
- Music by: Detto Mariano
- Release date: 1980
- Running time: 109 minutes
- Country: Italy
- Language: Italian

La locandiera (also known as Mirandolina) is a 1980 Italian comedy film directed by Paolo Cavara, based on the Carlo Goldoni's three-act comedy The Mistress of the Inn.

== Plot ==
Mirandolina is famed for her beauty and runs an inn. From the outset, the count of Alba Fiorita and the marquis of Forlimpopoli are madly in love with her. The two nobles give her extravagant gifts, trying to impress and marry her. The cunning Mirandolina accepts their money and jewels without giving them her hand. A third man arrives on the scene: the Cavaliere di Ripafratta. He is extremely misogynistic and thinks that women bring only trouble to men.

Mirandolina, who had never encountered a man like this, is deeply offended and takes it upon herself to teach him a lesson. She goes out of her way to make him fall in love with her. She succeeds and leads him to admit in public that he has fallen in love with a woman. As a final punishment for his misogyny, she cruelly rejects him.

In the end, the beautiful Mirandolina realizes she loves Fabrizio, her waiter. She abandons her hobby of "falling in love with men" and decides to remain faithful only to him.

== Cast ==
- Claudia Mori as Mirandolina
- Adriano Celentano as Cavaliere di Ripafratta
- Paolo Villaggio as Marchese di Forlimpopoli
- Marco Messeri as Conte di Albafiorita
- Lorenza Guerrieri as Ortensia
- Gianni Cavina as Fabrizio
- Milena Vukotic as Dejanira
- Camillo Milli as Carlo Goldoni
