= Dr. Jekyll Likes Them Hot =

- Directed by: Steno
- Screenplay by: Leo Benvenuti; Piero De Bernardi; Steno
- Story by: Castellano & Pipolo
- Starring: Paolo Villaggio; Edwige Fenech; Gianrico Tedeschi; Gordon Mitchell
- Cinematography: Ennio Guarnieri; Sergio Salvati
- Edited by: Raimondo Crociani
- Music by: Armando Trovajoli
- Production company: Medusa Distribuzione
- Distributed by: Medusa
- Release date: 31 August 1979 (Italy)
- Running time: 107 minutes
- Country: Italy

Dr. Jekyll Likes Them Hot (Italian: Dottor Jekyll e gentile signora) is a 1979 Italian film directed by Steno based in part on Robert Louis Stevenson's 1886 novella Strange Case of Dr. Jekyll & Mr. Hyde.

== Plot ==
The evil genius Dr. Jekyll, director of the powerful multinational food company PANTAC which has flooded the world with a large number of pollutants and harmful products, accidentally drinks the "serum of good", turning into a good-natured and placid Mr. Hyde...

== Cast ==
- Paolo Villaggio as Dr. Jekyll / Mr. Hyde
- Edwige Fenech as Barbara Wimply
- Gianrico Tedeschi as Jeeves
- Gordon Mitchell as Pretorius
- Paolo Paoloni as Director

== Production ==
Dr. Jekyll Likes Them Hot was originally titled as Il dottor Jekill Junior. According to the public register, filming began on July 31, 1978. The film was shot on location in London.

== Release ==
Dr. Jekyll Likes Them Hot was distributed theatrically in Italy by Medusa on 31 August 1979. The film grossed 427,000,000 Italian lire domestically.
