= Fantozzi subisce ancora =

- Directed by: Neri Parenti
- Written by: Leonardo Benvenuti; Piero De Bernardi; Paolo Villaggio; Neri Parenti
- Produced by: Augusto Caminito
- Starring: Paolo Villaggio
- Cinematography: Alberto Spagnoli
- Edited by: Sergio Montanari
- Music by: Bruno Zambrini
- Distributed by: Titanus
- Release date: 1983
- Running time: 85 minutes
- Language: Italian

Fantozzi subisce ancora ("Fantozzi Succumbs Again") is a 1983 Italian comedy film directed by Neri Parenti. It is the fourth chapter in the Fantozzi film series of the unlucky clerk Ugo Fantozzi, played by its creator, Paolo Villaggio.

== Plot ==
New misadventures of Accountant Fantozzi: a reunion of the apartment building's tenants, the campervan holiday, the pregnancy of his daughter Mariangela, the company games of athletics, the moment of the political elections.

== Cast ==
- Paolo Villaggio as Ugo Fantozzi
- Milena Vukotic as Pina Fantozzi
- Gigi Reder as Filini
- Plinio Fernando as Mariangela Fantozzi
- Anna Mazzamauro as Mrs. Silvani
- Riccardo Garrone as Luciano Calboni
- Andrea Roncato as Loris Batacchi
- Michele Mirabella as Fonelli Cobram II
- Ugo Bologna as Director Count Corrado Maria Lobbiam
- Camillo Milli as Dottor Grandi
- Marina Hedman as The Countess
- Alessandro Haber as Dr. Zamprini Loredano
- Clara Colosimo as Nun at the Hospital
- Carlo Colombo as Accountant Colsi
- Antonio Francioni as Accountant Mughini
- Antonio Allocca as The Shopkeeper
- Ennio Antonelli as Pizzettaro
