= Tesoro mio =

- Italian theatrical release poster
- Directed by: Giulio Paradisi
- Written by: Leo Benvenuti; Piero De Bernardi; Paolo Brigenti
- Cinematography: Roberto D'Ettorre Piazzoli
- Edited by: Mario Morra
- Music by: Detto Mariano
- Release date: 1979
- Running time: 108 minute
- Country: Italy
- Language: Italian

Tesoro mio (also spelled Tesoromio) is a 1979 Italian romantic comedy film directed by Giulio Paradisi. It is based on the comedy play Chérie noire by Francois Campaux.

== Plot ==
Playwright irreparable failure is betrayed by a concubine with the lawyer that finances the charade. But one day arrives at his house Honey, Eastern African domestic workers to first service, to boot, is a billionaire and of royal blood.

== Cast ==
- Johnny Dorelli as Enrico Moroni
- Zeudi Araya as Tesoro Houaua
- Sandra Milo as Solange
- Renato Pozzetto as Pierluigi
- Enrico Maria Salerno as Roberto Manetta
- Carlo Bagno as the butler
- Angelo Pellegrino as the Carabinieri marshal
- Vincenzo Crocitti as member of the theatre committee
- Paolo Paoloni member of the theatre committee

== Production ==
Mauro Bolognini was originally announced as the director of the film.
