= Fantozzi in paradiso =

Fantozzi in Paradiso
- Directed by: Neri Parenti
- Written by: Paolo Villaggio; Leonardo Benvenuti; Piero De Bernardi; Alessandro Bencivenni; Domenico Saverni; Neri Parenti
- Produced by: Mario Cecchi Gori; Vittorio Cecchi Gori; Silvio Berlusconi
- Starring: Paolo Villaggio; Milena Vukotic; Anna Mazzamauro; Gigi Reder
- Music by: Bruno Zambrini
- Distributed by: Variety Distribution
- Release date: 1993
- Running time: 108 minutes
- Country: Italy
- Language: Italian

Fantozzi in Paradiso (Fantozzi in Heaven) is a 1993 Italian comedy film directed by Neri Parenti. It is the eighth chapter in the Fantozzi film series of the unlucky clerk Ugo Fantozzi, played by its creator, Paolo Villaggio. In this film, Fantozzi dies. It is followed by Fantozzi - Il ritorno (1996).

== Plot ==
Ugo Fantozzi, Filini, Fonelli, Calboni and Miss Silvani are no longer the valiant and unfortunate accountants and clerks of their youth, keen on cheating their company by just pretending to work, or to extreme display of servility such as when performing the role of doormat for the boss. Fantozzi is involved in an accident at the cemetery and although feeling well and not suffering any serious consequences from the mishap, is told at a subsequent doctor's checkup that he only has a week left to live. His first reaction is to finally go for every risky activity, adventure and adrenaline rush, that he had refrained from during all his life. This however does not last long, and Fantozzi falls into deep depression, compounded by having been squatted away from his family house by the now adult daughter Mariangela and her husband, the gorilla Bongo. The protagonist's wife Pina takes pity of him, and makes arrangements behind his back to grant him a last love episode with his ex-colleague Miss Silvani. The woman accepts to simulate final capitulation to his courtship, after refusing it with disgust for years, in return for money to pay off her debts. Pina stages a fake quarrel with Fantozzi, to kick him out of their makeshift home within a garage, and the paid-for love escape to Cortina d'Ampezzo can start. Initially Fantozzi is so overwhelmed that he cannot perform in bed. The hotel barman however offers him a strange concoction of powerful aphrodisiacs and spices, leading to a night of over-the-top, mountain-shaking sex that surprises and overcomes all reticence in Miss Silvani, finally in love. Having at last regained self-confidence, Fantozzi is about to send his wife Pina an insulting divorce letter, when he finds out by chance that it was only thanks to her care and sacrifice that Miss Silvani had finally capitulated. Returning home to her in Rome, Fantozzi gets busy in devoting his last hours to exaggerated acts of penitence and contrition. He is in the middle of climbing stairs to a church on his knees with a crown of thorns (Like the one who wore Jesus Christ on the cross) and a comically big boulder on his back, when Pina reaches him with sudden good news: the doctor has figured out the wrong diagnosis, which was not for him but for the priest also involved at the cemetery accident and now the leading the same penitence act. Fantozzi exults euphorically, but does not notice in his enthusiasm an approaching truck, which runs him over and launches him under a road roller which gruesomely kills him. The movie ends with him looking down at his funeral, where his corpse is being brought to the cemetery in a very thin coffin, his ex-colleagues telling his wife how "It's always the worst who go away first", and Miss Silvani, being actually sad for his death, moving up and down her hand over an enormously long candle as if she was masturbating it; She then proceeds to say "It's like i can still see him in front of me!". On the way to Paradise, the divine airplane carrying him is hijacked by Buddhist terrorists seeking revenge for terrorism against them before death. In front of Buddha, who comically decides using a wheel of fortune (which leads Fantozzi to refer to him as "Mike"), he is convicted to living his whole previous life once again.

== Cast ==
- Paolo Villaggio as Ugo Fantozzi
- Milena Vukotic as Pina Fantozzi
- Gigi Reder as Filini
- Anna Mazzamauro as Miss Silvani
