= Sogni mostruosamente proibiti =

- Italian theatrical release poster by Renato Casaro
- Directed by: Neri Parenti
- Written by: Neri Parenti; Laura Toscano; Franco Marotta
- Starring: Paolo Villaggio; Janet Agren
- Cinematography: Alberto Spagnoli
- Edited by: Sergio Montanari
- Music by: Bruno Zambrini
- Production company: Intercapital
- Distributed by: Cinema International Corporation
- Release date: 1982
- Running time: 90 min
- Country: Italy
- Language: Italian

Sogni mostruosamente proibiti (transl. Monstrously Forbidden Dreams) is a 1982 Italian comedy film directed by Neri Parenti. The film is loosely inspired by The Secret Life of Walter Mitty.

== Plot ==
Paolo Coniglio is a naive and bumbling writer in a publishing house of comics, bullied by the director and by his future mother-in-law. To escape the dreary daily routine, he finds himself the protagonist of very vivid daydreams in the company of Dalia, the beautiful heroine of the comic books who is responsible of translating. His visions play with popular heroes of the literature and comics, like Parsifal, Superman and Tarzan. Every time his awakening is increasingly more abrupt, when one day, doing the grocery shopping, he meets a charming blonde girl identical to Dalia that, against his will, involves him in a shady intrigue.

== Cast ==
- Paolo Villaggio as Paolo Coniglio
- Janet Agren as Dalia
- Alessandro Haber as Commissioner Rovere
- Antonio Allocca as Brigadier Lamanna
- Sophia Lombardo as Marina Saracini
- Alida Valli as Marina's Mother
- Camillo Milli as Publishing House Director
- Paul Muller as Hotel Butler
- Stefano Antonucci as Franchini
- Chris Avram as Fonseca
- Giulio Farnese as Lawyer Bauer
- Paolo Gozlino as Conductor
- Ennio Antonelli as Driver
- Mike Bongiorno as Himself
- Björn Borg as Himself

== See also ==
- List of Italian films of 1982
