= Fantozzi – Il ritorno =

Fantozzi - Il ritorno
- Directed by: Neri Parenti
- Written by: Leonardo Benvenuti; Piero De Bernardi; Paolo Villaggio; Neri Parenti; Alessandro Bencivenni; Domenico Saverni
- Produced by: Fulvio Lucisano; Vittorio Cecchi Gori; Rita Rusic
- Starring: Paolo Villaggio; Milena Vukotic; Gigi Reder; Maria Cristina Maccà; Maurizio Mattioli; Anna Mazzamauro
- Cinematography: Sandro D'Eva
- Edited by: Sergio Montanari
- Music by: Bruno Zambrini
- Distributed by: Cecchi Gori
- Release date: 1996
- Running time: 82 minutes
- Language: Italian

Fantozzi – Il ritorno ("Fantozzi – The Return") is a 1996 Italian comedy film directed by Neri Parenti. It is the ninth chapter in the Fantozzi film series of the unlucky clerk Ugo Fantozzi, played by its creator, Paolo Villaggio.

== Plot ==
Due to the lack of free places in Paradise, an angel sends Fantozzi back on earth thanks to an agreement under which he will resume his life as if he had never died. On earth, Fantozzi will have to face the puberty of his granddaughter Ughina, a deep depression caused by his andropause, the false pregnancy of signorina Silvani and a false accusation of corruption.

== Cast ==
- Paolo Villaggio as Ugo Fantozzi
- Milena Vukotic as Pina Fantozzi
- Gigi Reder as Filini
- Anna Mazzamauro as signorina Silvani
- Maria Cristina Maccà as Mariangela Fantozzi / Uga Fantozzi
- Paolo Paoloni as Galactic Megadirector Duke Count Balabam
- Angelo Bernabucci as Telecom Employee
- Maurizio Mattioli as Plastic Surgeon
- Antonio Allocca as Train Inspector
- Fabio Traversa as Guardia di Finanza Agent
- Mauro Vestri as Guardia di Finanza Agent
- Nello Riviè as Public Prosecutor
- Gianni Franco as Police Commissioner
- Éva Henger as Chat-Line Announcer
