= Renato Cecchetto =

Italian voice actor (1951–2022)

- Born: 28 October 1951; Adria, Italy
- Died: 23 January 2022 (aged 70); Rome, Italy
- Occupations: Actor; voice actor; dubbing director
- Years active: 1980–2022
- Spouse: Miriam Spera
- Children: 1

Renato Cecchetto (28 October 1951 – 23 January 2022) was an Italian actor and voice actor.

== Biography ==
In the 1970s, Cecchetto attended the Silvio d'Amico National Academy of Dramatic Arts and began his career working with film directors like Mario Monicelli and Carlo Vanzina.

Cecchetto was best known as a voice actor, who gave his voice to Shrek in the Italian dub of the Shrek franchise and to nearly all the Disney Pixar characters originally voiced by John Ratzenberger, including Hamm in the first four Toy Story films, Mack from the Cars film series, Yeti the Abominable Snowman from the Monsters, Inc. film series, and P.T. Flea from A Bug's Life. Additionally, Cecchetto served as the voice of Meow Meow Fuzzyface in the Italian dub of BoJack Horseman and from seasons 12 to 19, he was the Italian voice of Cleveland Brown on Family Guy, replacing Luciano Marchitiello.

In Cecchetto's live action roles, he dubbed over the voices of John Candy as the title character in Uncle Buck, Temuera Morrison as Axel Hood in Barb Wire and Jeffrey Tambor as Sid Garner in The Hangover film trilogy.

=== Personal life ===
Cecchetto was married to the actress and theatrical director Miriam Spera. They had one son.

== Death ==
Cecchetto died of complications from injuries sustained in a scooter accident at the San Camillo Hospital in Rome on 23 January 2022, at the age of 70.

== Filmography ==
=== Cinema ===
Year	Title	Role(s)	Notes
1981	Guys and Dolls in the Suburbs	Walter	
1981	Fracchia the Fanatic	DIGOS' Chief	
1982	Pierino colpisce ancora	Dr. Paoletti	
1982	Roma dalla finestra		
1982	Grog	Caputo	
1982	All My Friends Part 2	Augusto Verdirame	
1982	The Female Bodyguard	The Jeweler	
1982	Buona come il pane	Gaston	
1983	The Story of Piera	Male nurse	
1983	The Pool Hustlers	Giovanni	
1984	Ladies & Gentlemen		
1985	Fatto su misura		
1986	The Carabinieri Lieutenant	Urban Security Guard	
1986	Italian Fast Food	Director	
1987	L'estate sta finendo	Prete	
1988	Animali metropolitani	Oscar Innocenzi	
1988	Rimini Rimini - Un anno dopo	Luciano’s friend	
1990	Fantozzi to the Rescue	Judge	
1991	Abbronzatissimi	Osvaldo	
1992	Dearest Relatives, Poisonous Relations	Filippo	
1992	Persone perbene		
1993	Abbronzatissimi 2 - Un anno dopo	Mr. Boccioni	
1994	Prestazione straordinaria	Ernesto	
2002	Johan Padan a la descoverta de le Americhe	Capo Cachicco (voice)	Animated film

=== Television ===
Year	Title	Role(s)	Notes
1977	Il bagno		
1980	Bambole: scene di un delitto perfetto	Calascibetta	TV miniseries
1983	Bebawi - Il delitto di via Lazio		TV miniseries
1984	La piovra	Achille Bordonaro	TV miniseries
1984	I racconti del maresciallo	Gerente Motel	TV miniseries
1986	La piovra 2	Achille Bordonaro	TV miniseries
1987	Cinque storie inquietanti		TV miniseries
1988	Una lepre con la faccia di bambina	Ragioniere Clerici	TV miniseries
1989	Oggi ho vinto anch'io	Vittorio	TV film
1990	Non aprite all'uomo nero		TV film
1994	Sì, ti voglio bene		TV miniseries
1994	In fondo al cuore		TV miniseries
1998	Anni '50	Concierge	TV miniseries
1998	Come quando fuori piove	Bernardo	TV film
2005	Le voyage de Louisa		TV film

=== Dubbing ===
==== Film (Animation, Italian dub) ====
Year	Title	Role(s)	Ref
1995	Toy Story	Hamm	
1998	A Bug's Life	P.T. Flea	
1999	Toy Story 2	Hamm	
2000	Buzz Lightyear of Star Command: The Adventure Begins	Hamm	
2001	Shrek	Shrek	
2001	Monsters, Inc.	Yeti the Abominable Snowman	
2003	Finding Nemo	School of Moonfish	
2003	Shrek 4-D	Shrek	
2004	The Lion King 1½	Uncle Max	
2004	Shrek 2	Shrek	
2006	Cars	Mack	
2006	Cars	Hamm Truck	
2006	Cars	Yeti the Abominable Snowplow	
2006	Cars	P.T. Flea Car	
2007	Shrek the Third	Shrek	
2007	Ratatouille	Mustafa	
2008	WALL-E	John	
2009	Up	Tom	
2010	Shrek Forever After	Shrek	
2010	Toy Story 3	Hamm	
2011	Toy Story Toons: Hawaiian Vacation	Hamm	
2011	Cars 2	Mack	
2011	Toy Story Toons: Small Fry	Hamm	
2012	Toy Story Toons: Partysaurus Rex	Hamm	
2013	Monsters University	Yeti the Abominable Snowman	
2014	The Boxtrolls	Mr. Trout	
2014	Asterix: The Mansions of the Gods	Humerus	
2015	Inside Out	Fritz	
2015	The Good Dinosaur	Earl	
2016	Finding Dory	Bill	
2017	Cars 3	Mack	
2017	The Breadwinner	Razaq	
2017	Coco	Juan Ortodoncia	
2018	Asterix: The Secret of the Magic Potion	Obelix	
2019	Toy Story 4	Hamm	
2019	Klaus	Aksel Ellingboe	
2020	Onward	Fennwick	

==== Films (Live action, Italian dub) ====
Year	Title	Role(s)	Original actor	Ref
1989	Uncle Buck	Buck Russell	John Candy	
1990	Darkman	Pauly Mazzuchelli	Nicholas Worth	
1991	Problem Child 2	Smith	Paul Willson	
1994	The Mask	Detective Doyle	Jim Doughan	
1996	Barb Wire	Axel Hood	Temuera Morrison	
1997	Marquise	Gros René	Patrick Timsit	
1999	Fantasia 2000	James Levine	James Levine	
2001	Vanilla Sky	Thomas Tipp	Timothy Spall	
2002	Big Fat Liar	Marcus Duncan	Russell Hornsby	
2004	The Life and Death of Peter Sellers	Maurice Woodruff	Stephen Fry	
2004	Ocean's Twelve	Ian Nicholas McNally / Matsui	Robbie Coltrane	
2007	Balls of Fury	Ernie Rodriguez	George Lopez	
2009	Dragonball Evolution	Mr. Kingery	Julian Sedgwick	
2009	The Hangover	Sid Garner	Jeffrey Tambor	
2011	The Hangover Part II	Sid Garner	Jeffrey Tambor	
2013	The Hangover Part III	Sid Garner	Jeffrey Tambor	
2015	Ip Man 3	Fat Po	Kent Cheng	
2016	Catfight	Dr. Jones	Dylan Baker	
2017	Goodbye Christopher Robin	Rupert	Richard McCabe	
2017	Pitch Perfect 3	Fergus Hobart	John Lithgow	
2018	Gotti	Bartholomew Boriello	Leo Rossi	

==== Television (Animation, Italian dub) ====
Year	Title	Role(s)	Notes	Ref
1983–2006	Dr. Slump	Suppaman	Recurring role (1st edition)	
1995	Camp Candy	John Candy	Main cast	
2003	Pigs Next Door	Phil	Main cast	
2007	Shrek the Halls	Shrek	TV special	
2007	Vampiyan Kids	Franken	1 episode (season 1x08)	
2010	Scared Shrekless	Shrek	TV special	
2010–2012	The Penguins of Madagascar	Commissioner McSlade	4 episodes	
2013–2014	Monsters vs. Aliens	Coverton	Main cast	
2014–2022	Family Guy	Cleveland Brown	Recurring role (seasons 12–19)	
2015–2018	BoJack Horseman	Meow Meow Fuzzyface	Recurring role (seasons 1–5)	
2015–2019	Star vs. the Forces of Evil	Glossaryck	Main cast (seasons 1–4)	
2019	The Dark Crystal: Age of Resistance	The Gourmand / skekAyuk	1 episode	
2019–2021	Amphibia	Mayor Fredrick Toadstool	Recurring role (seasons 1–2)	
2020	Forky Asks a Question	Hamm	2 short films	
2021–2022	Monsters at Work	Yeti the Abominable Snowman	Recurring role (seasons 1)	

==== Television (Live action, Italian dub) ====
Year	Title	Role(s)	Notes	Original actor	Ref
1983–1988	St. Elsewhere	Dr. Elliot Axelrod	Main cast (2nd voice)	Stephen Furst	
1985	Emerald Point N.A.S.	Jack Warren	Main cast	Charles Frank	
1990–1991	Out of This World	Beano Froelich	Main cast	Joe Alaskey	
2003	Alias	Anthony Russek	3 episodes (season 1)	Miguel Sandoval	
2017	Gotham	Lazlo Valentin / Professor Pyg	5 episodes	Michael Cerveris	

==== Video games (Italian dub) ====
Year	Title	Role(s)	Ref
1997	Outlaws	Bob Graham	
1998	Grim Fandango	Manny Calavera	
1998	A Bug's Life	P.T. Flea	
1998	Star Wars Jedi Knight: Mysteries of the Sith	Kyle Katarn	
2002	Hitman 2: Silent Assassin	Charlie Sidjan	
2003	Finding Nemo	School of Moonfish	
2006	Cars	Mack	
2009	Star Wars: The Clone Wars – Republic Heroes	Clone troopers	
2013	Disney Infinity	Hamm	
2017	Cars 3: Driven to Win	Mack	
