= Pronto... c'è una certa Giuliana per te =

- Directed by: Massimo Franciosa
- Cinematography: Pasqualino De Santis
- Edited by: Sergio Montanari
- Music by: Mario Nascimbene
- Release date: 1967
- Language: Italian

Pronto... c'è una certa Giuliana per te ('Hello... there's a certain Giuliana for you') is a 1967 Italian romantic comedy film directed by Massimo Franciosa. For this film Mario Nascimbene won the Nastro d'Argento for Best Score.

== Cast ==
- Mita Medici: Giuliana
- Gianni Dei: Paolo
- Marina Malfatti: Annalisa
- Françoise Prévost: mother of Paolo
- Paolo Ferrari: father of Paolo
- Caterina Boratto: Aunt Amelia
- Silvia Dionisio: Stefania
- Anna Mazzamauro: Marina
