= Milena Vukotic =

Italian actress (born 1935)

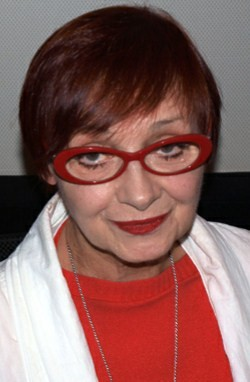
- Vukotic in 2010
- Born: 23 April 1935 (age 91); Rome, Kingdom of Italy
- Occupation: Actress
- Years active: 1961–present
- Height: 1.62 m (5 ft 4 in)

Milena Vukotic (Italian: [miˈlɛːna ˈvuːkotitʃ], Montenegrin: [mîlena vǔkotitɕ]; born 23 April 1935) is an Italian actress of film, stage and television and former ballerina.

== Biography ==
Vukotic was born in Rome, to a Montenegrin comedy playwright father and an Italian pianist/composer mother. As a child she studied acting and classical dance, in Italy and France.

A character actress, Vukotic became well known for her role of Pina Fantozzi in the Fantozzi series of comedy films (winning a Nastro d'Argento for Best Supporting Actress for her role in Fantozzi in paradiso) and, later in her life, for the role of Grandma Enrica in the TV series Un medico in famiglia. She worked with Federico Fellini in Juliet of the Spirits and Toby Dammit, with Luis Buñuel in The Discreet Charm of the Bourgeoisie, The Phantom of Liberty and That Obscure Object of Desire and with Andrei Tarkovsky in Nostalghia.

On stage, she became one of Rina Morelli's favourite actresses and worked in other prestigious theatrical productions with directors like Franco Zeffirelli, Giorgio Strehler, Paolo Poli and Jean Cocteau.

She had a recurring role on the French television series Une famille formidable. In 1987 she played in the German series Anna, which was a big success in the German-speaking countries.

== Filmography ==
=== Film ===
Year	Title	Role(s)	Notes
1961	Blood Feud	Renata	
1961	Totòtruffa 62	Student	Credited as Milena Wukotich
1961	Come September	Milena	
1961	Atlas in the Land of the Cyclops	Dancer	Cameo
1961	The Centurion	Melinda	
1963	The Four Musketeers	Waitress	Cameo
1963	Gidget Goes to Rome	Party guest	Uncredited
1963	Liolà	Mariagrazia	
1964	The Thursday	Lidia	
1964	The Vampire of the Opera	Carlotta	
1965	Questa volta parliamo di uomini	Saturnia	
1965	Juliet of the Spirits	Elisabetta	
1965	Thrilling	Laboratory assistant	Cameo
1965	Made in Italy	Luigino's wife	Segment: "Il lavoro"
1966	Rita the Mosquito	Dance instructor	Cameo
1966	The Devil in Love	Maddalena's servant	
1966	Perdono	English teacher	
1967	The Taming of the Shrew	Antonia	
1967	On My Way to the Crusades, I Met a Girl Who...	Veiled woman	Uncredited
1967	Arabella	Graziella	
1968	The Biggest Bundle of Them All	Angelina Pedrone	
1968	Il marito è mio e l'ammazzo quando mi pare	Prassede	
1968	Spirits of the Dead	TV Interviewer	Segment: "Toby Dammit"
1969	Love and Anger	Nurse	Segment: "Agonia"
1970	Rosolino Paternò, soldato...	Annuzza	
1970	The Adventurers	April Stavronis	
1970	Come Have Coffee with Us	Camilla Tettamanzi	
1971	Trastevere	Delia	
1972	The Discreet Charm of the Bourgeoisie	Inès	
1973	Black Holiday	Daria Rossini	
1974	Blood for Dracula	Esmeralda	
1974	E cominciò il viaggio nella vertigine	Liama	
1974	Erotomania	Cleofe	
1974	The Phantom of Liberty	The Nurse	
1975	Il caso Raoul	Maddalena	
1975	Act of Aggression	Le juge	
1975	My Friends	Alice Mascetti	
1975	Amor vuol dire gelosia	Licia	
1977	That Obscure Object of Desire	Woman on train	Cameo
1977	Black Journal	Tina	
1978	Le braghe del padrone	Liliana	
1978	Per vivere meglio, divertitevi con noi	Picci	Segment: "Non si può spiegare, bisogna vederlo"
1979	Saturday, Sunday and Friday	Clelia Benelli	
1980	La terrazza	Emanuela	
1980	La locandiera	Dejanira	
1980	Sunday Lovers	Nora	
1980	Fantozzi contro tutti	Pina Fantozzi	
1981	Bianco, rosso e Verdone	Prostitute	Cameo
1981	Cornetti alla crema	Elena Petruzzelli	
1981	Il turno	Elena	
1982	Monsignor	Verna	
1982	All My Friends Part 2	Alice Mascetti	
1983	The House of the Yellow Carpet	Psychiatrist	
1983	Nostalghia	Civil servant	Cameo
1983	Occhio, malocchio, prezzemolo e finocchio	Giovanna Secca	
1983	Fantozzi subisce ancora	Pina Fantozzi	
1984	The Moon in the Gutter	Frida	
1984	L'art d'aimer	Modestina	
1985	Mezzo destro mezzo sinistro – 2 calciatori senza pallone	Mirtilla Rubinacci	
1986	Max mon amour	Margaret's mother	
1987	Roba da ricchi	Mapi's friend	Segment: "Secondo episodio"
1987	The Distant Land	Madame Wahl	
1988	Fantozzi va in pensione	Pina Fantozzi	
1990	Fantozzi alla riscossa	Pina Fantozzi	
1991	The Wicked	Annette	
1993	Abissinia	Armida	
1993	Stefano Quantestorie	Stefano's mother	
1993	Fantozzi in paradiso	Pina Fantozzi	
1994	Italia Village	Gloria	
1996	Per favore, strozzate la cicogna	Giulia	
1996	Fantozzi – Il ritorno	Pina Fantozzi	
1999	Fantozzi 2000 – La clonazione	Pina Fantozzi	
2000	Lontano in fondo agli occhi	The Teacher	
2006	A Good Woman	Countess Lucchino	
2007	Saturn in Opposition	Marta	
2007	All'amore assente	Magda	
2008	A Perfect Day	Teacher	Cameo
2010	Scontro di civiltà per un ascensore a Piazza Vittorio	Mrs. Fabiani	
2010	Letters to Juliet	Maria	
2013	The Chair of Happiness	Armida	
2014	Noi 4	Alberta	
2016	La macchinazione	Susanna Coluzzi	
2016	Ears	Mrs. Marinetti	
2017	Natale da chef	Lina	
2018	Respiri	Anna	
2018	Ride	Ada	
2020	In vacanza su Marte	Tina	
2021	Dorothy non deve morire	Dorothy	Short film
2022	Dante	Junk dealer	Cameo
2024	Diamonds	Aunt Olga	

=== Television ===
Year	Title	Role(s)	Notes
1963	La bella addormentata	Dancer	Television movie
1964–1965	Il giornalino di Gian Burrasca	Virginia	6 episodes
1966	Quinta colonna	Nanny	Episode: "Episode 2"
1968	Liliom	Mari	Television movie
1974	Nel mondo di Alice	Alice	4 episodes
1978	Il processo	Leni	Television movie
1979	Under Western Eyes	Tekla	2 episodes
1980	Il camaleonte	Cora Ann Milton	Television movie
1982	The Life of Verdi	Clara Maffei	9 episodes
1982	Anna, Ciro e compagnia	Grandma	20 episodes
1984	Via Mala	Sophie Lauretz	3 episodes
1987	Aeroporto internazionale	Ferrini's wife	Episode: "Il comandante Ferrini"
1989	Mano rubata	Fabienne	Television movie
1996	Favola	Shop owner	Television movie
1998–2016	Un medico in famiglia	Enrica Morelli	154 episodes
1999, 2007	Une famille formidable	Paule	3 episodes
2011	Rex	Clotilde / Sveva	Episode: "Occhi di gatto"
2019	Ballando con le Stelle	Herself / Contestant	Season 14
2022	The Ignorant Angels	Elsa	Episode: "La famiglia"

== Awards and nominations ==
=== David di Donatello ===
- 1983 nominated to David di Donatello for Best Supporting Actress for her performance in All My Friends Part 2
- 1991 nominated to David di Donatello for Best Supporting Actress for her performance in Fantozzi alla riscossa
- 2014 nominated to David di Donatello for Best Supporting Actress for her performance in The Chair of Happiness

=== Nastro d'Argento ===
- 1976 nominated to Nastro d'Argento Best supporting Actress for her performance in My Friends
- 1991 nominated to Nastro d'Argento Best supporting Actress for her performance in Fantozzi alla riscossa
- 1994 Nastro d'Argento Best supporting Actress for her performance in Fantozzi in paradiso
- 2016 nominated to Nastro d'Argento Best supporting Actress for her performance in La macchinazione
