= Anna Mazzamauro =

Italian actress, comedian and television personality

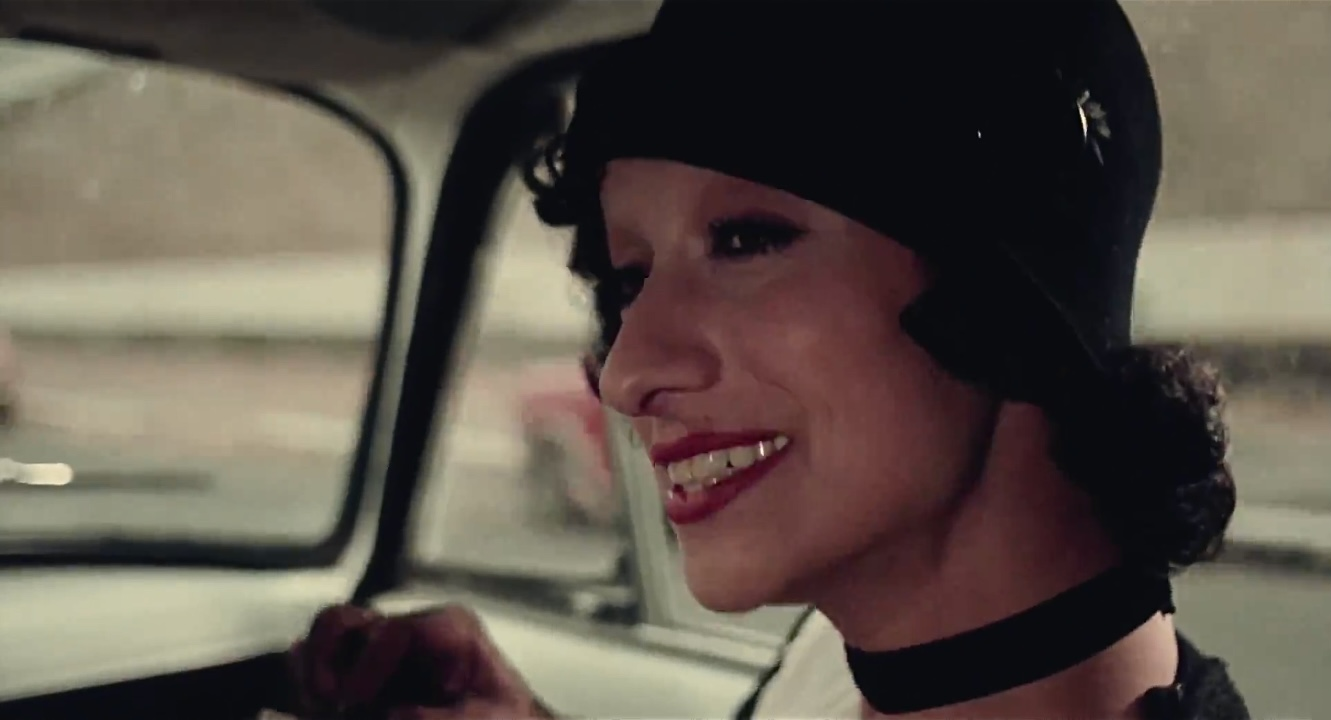
- Mazzamauro in Fantozzi (1975)
- Born: Anna Maria Mazzamauro; 1 December 1938 (age 87); Rome, Kingdom of Italy
- Occupation: Actress

Anna Maria Mazzamauro (born 1 December 1938) is an Italian actress, comedian and television personality.

== Life and career ==
Born in Rome, Mazzamauro made her film debut in 1967, in Massimo Franciosa's Pronto... c'è una certa Giuliana per te. She is best known for her role of Mrs. Silvani in the Fantozzi film series. In 1994 she was nominated to Nastro d'Argento for Best Supporting Actress for her performance in Fantozzi in paradiso. Mazzamauro is also active on stage and on television and is an author and a singer.

== Filmography ==
Year	Title	Role	Notes
1967	Pronto... c'è una certa Giuliana per te	Marina	
1974	The Beast	Friend of Amalia	
1975	Fantozzi	Signorina Silvani	
1975	Frankenstein Italian Style	Maud	
1976	Il secondo tragico Fantozzi	Signorina Silvani	
1976	Tutti possono arricchire tranne i poveri	Viviana Renzelli	
1976	La prima notte di nozze		
1977	Three Tigers Against Three Tigers	Giada Nardi	
1977	Il... Belpaese	Signora Gruber	
1979	Io zombo, tu zombi, lei zomba	Vedova	
1980	The Precarious Bank Teller	Selvaggia degli Antigori	
1981	Fracchia la belva umana	Signorina Corvino	
1983	Fantozzi subisce ancora	Signorina Silvani	
1983	Sfrattato cerca casa equo canone	Angelica Stroppaghetti	
1984	Champagne in paradiso	Cesarina, the Matron	
1988	Fantozzi va in pensione	Signorina Silvani	
1990	Fantozzi alla riscossa	Signorina Silvani	
1993	Fantozzi in paradiso	Signorina Silvani	
1996	Fantozzi - Il ritorno	Signorina Silvani	
1999	Fantozzi 2000 – La clonazione	Signorina Silvani	
1999	Una furtiva lacrima		
2016	Poveri ma ricchi	Nonna Nicoletta Tucci	
2017	Poveri ma ricchissimi	Nicoletta	(final film role)
