= Fantozzi va in pensione =

- Directed by: Neri Parenti
- Written by: Leonardo Benvenuti; Piero De Bernardi; Paolo Villaggio; Neri Parenti; Alessandro Bencivenni; Domenico Saverni
- Produced by: Mario & Vittorio Cecchi Gori
- Starring: Paolo Villaggio
- Cinematography: Alberto Spagnoli
- Edited by: Sergio Montanari
- Music by: Bruno Zambrini
- Production company: Cecchi Gori Group
- Distributed by: Columbia Tri-Star Films Italia
- Release date: 22 December 1988
- Running time: 94 minutes
- Language: Italian

Fantozzi va in pensione ("Fantozzi Retires") is a 1988 Italian comedy film directed by Neri Parenti. It is the sixth chapter in the Fantozzi film series of the unlucky clerk Ugo Fantozzi, played by its creator, Paolo Villaggio.

== Plot ==
The accountant Fantozzi has reached the retirement age and left the work: he is now finally free from the stress of work but boredom seems to take over. He then tries the political activity, adopts a "puppy", goes on a trip to Venice, tries to find new jobs. He eventually came back to work at his former company in exchange for his pension.

== Cast ==
- Paolo Villaggio as Ugo Fantozzi
- Milena Vukotic as Pina Fantozzi
- Gigi Reder as Filini
- Plinio Fernando as Mariangela Fantozzi / Uga Fantozzi
- Anna Mazzamauro as Mrs. Silvani
- Paul Muller as Duke Count Francesco Maria Barambani
- Antonio Allocca as The Examiner
- Pino Ferrara as Accountant Fonelli
- Albano Bufalini as Mr. Colsi
