= Gigi Reder =

Italian actor (1928–1998)

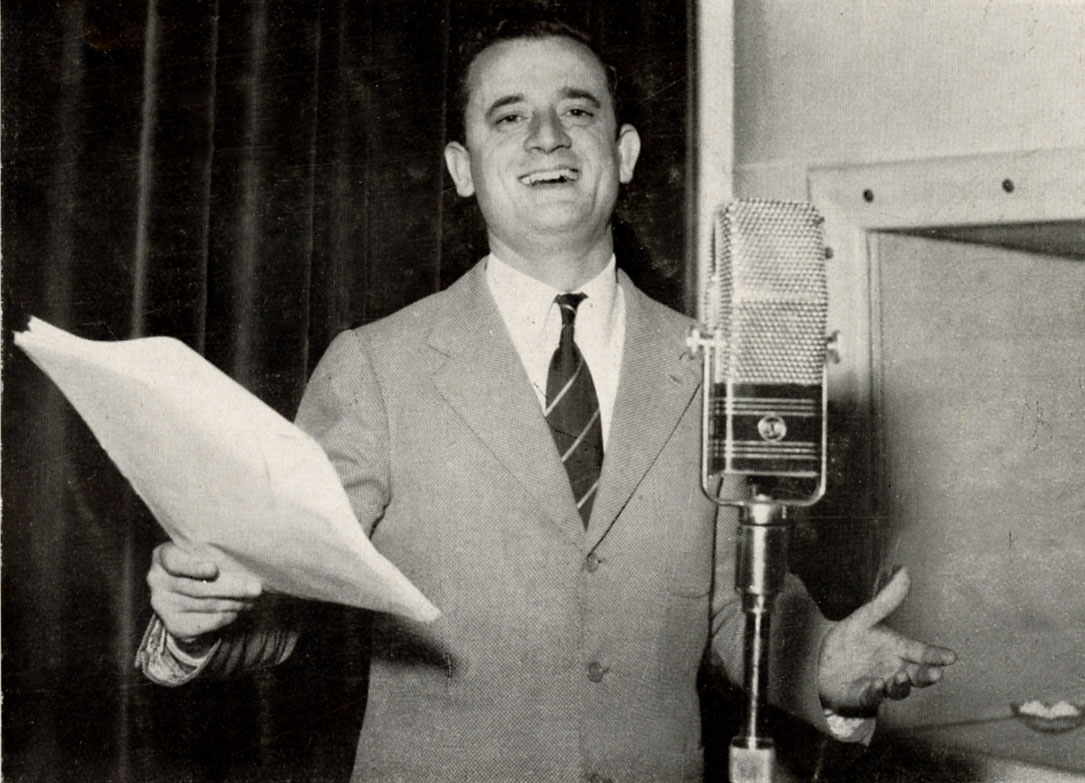
- Reder in 1953
- Born: Luigi Schroeder; 25 March 1928; Naples, Italy
- Died: 8 October 1998 (aged 70); Rome, Italy
- Occupations: Actor; voice actor
- Years active: 1951–1998
- Height: 1.70 m (5 ft 7 in)
- Children: 1

Gigi Reder (born Luigi Schroeder; 25 March 1928 – 8 October 1998) was an Italian actor and voice actor.

== Biography ==
Born in Naples in to a German father and a Neapolitan mother, Reder moved to Rome where started his career in radio as host and actor of radio-dramas. He also debuted on stage in "teatro dialettale" and vaudeville, then performed in the stage companies of Peppino De Filippo, Turi Ferro, Giorgio Albertazzi and Mario Scaccia. Reder made his film debut in the early 1950s, but became popular in the 1970s as the sidekick of Paolo Villaggio in some successful comedies, such as the Fantozzi and Fracchia series.

Reder was best known for the role of Filini in the Fantozzi film series. Filini was Fantozzi's colleague and his closest friend. Filini was used to organize a lot of trips, travels and parties with colleagues. He was an atheist.

== Selected filmography ==
- 47 morto che parla (1950)
- Bellezze in bicicletta (1951)
- Una bruna indiavolata! (1951) – Cameriere bar stazione
- Stasera sciopero (1951)
- Licenza premio (1951) – Sergente
- Free Escape (1951)
- Porca miseria (1951)
- Carica eroica (1952) – Cavalry soldier
- Bread, Love and Dreams (1953) – Ricuccio
- Passionate Song (1953) – Un Turista
- Bread, Love and Jealousy (1954) – Ricuccio
- The Gold of Naples (1954) – Don Peppino's friend (segment "Pizze a credito") (uncredited)
- The Belle of Rome (1955) – Luigi
- Wild Love (1956) – Annibale
- Anna of Brooklyn (1958)
- La cento chilometri (1959) – The Superstitious Race Walker
- Il vedovo (1959) – Avv. Girondi
- Ferdinando I, re di Napoli (1959) – The Customs Officer
- Mina... fuori la guardia (1961) – Tenente
- Fra' Manisco cerca guai (1961) – Franceschiello
- Paris, My Love (1962) – Il Portinaio
- Made in Italy (1965) – The Tobacconist (segment "4 'Cittadini, stato e chiesa', episode 1")
- Zingara (1969) – Direttore ristorante
- Giacomo Casanova: Childhood and Adolescence (1969) – Salvatore
- Satiricosissimo (1970) – Innkeeper
- Cerca di capirmi (1970)
- A Pocketful of Chestnuts (1970) – Il cameriere
- Ma che musica maestro (1971) – Benedetto – father of Giulietta
- Little Funny Guy (1973)
- Fantozzi (1975) – Rag. Filini
- Il secondo tragico Fantozzi (1976) – Rag. Filini
- Il... Belpaese (1977) – Alfredo
- They Called Him Bulldozer (1978) – Curatolo
- Where Are You Going on Holiday? (1978) – Dottor Panunti (segment "Sì buana")
- Riavanti... Marsch! (1979) – Colonel Luigi Placidi
- Café Express (1980) – Antonio Cammarota
- Rag. Arturo De Fanti, bancario precario (1980) – Willy
- Fantozzi contro tutti (1980) – Rag. Filini
- Quando la coppia scoppia (1981) – Pier Giorgio Martini
- L'onorevole con l'amante sotto il letto (1981) – Vescovo
- Fracchia la belva umana (1981) – Madre della Belva Umana
- Vieni avanti cretino (1982) – The Man with a toothache
- Il tifoso, l'arbitro e il calciatore (1982) – Commendator Pecorazzi
- Gian Burrasca (1983) – Headmaster
- Stangata napoletana (1983)
- Fantozzi subisce ancora (1983) – Rag. Filini
- Sfrattato cerca casa equo canone (1983) – Pellecchia
- Champagne in paradiso (1984) – Director
- Mi faccia causa (1984) – Lawyer
- Who Is Afraid of Dracula? (1985) – Rag. Filini
- Una donna senza nome (1985) – L'allevatore
- Grandi magazzini (1986) – Dott. Kaufmann
- Superfantozzi (1986) – Filini
- Le diaboliche (1987)
- Fantozzi va in pensione (1988) – Rag. Filini
- Fantozzi alla riscossa (1990) – Rag. Filini
- The Great Pumpkin (1993) – Prof. Turati
- Fantozzi in paradiso (1993) – Rag. Filini
- A Dio piacendo (1995) – L'ingegner Camperi
- Fantozzi – Il ritorno (1996) – Rag. Filini (final film role)
