= Liù Bosisio =

Italian actress and voice actress

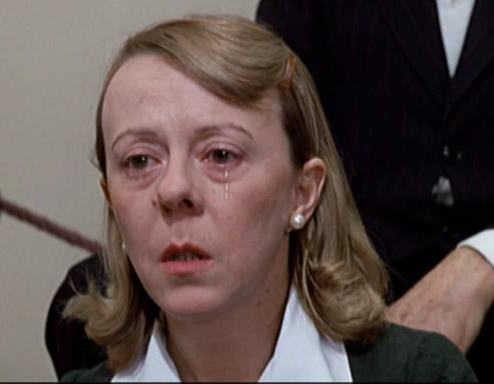
- Bosisio in Fantozzi (1975)
- Born: Luigia Bosisio Mauri; 30 January 1936 (age 90); Milan, Italy
- Occupations: Actress; voice actress; writer
- Years active: 1952–2011
- Height: 1.62 m (5 ft 4 in)
- Children: 1

Liù Bosisio (born Luigia Bosisio Mauri; 30 January 1936) is an Italian actress and voice actress.

== Biography ==
Bosisio was born in Milan on 30 January 1936. From 1953 to 1955, She attended the Accademia d'Arte Drammatica in her hometown. Bosisio was a stage actress with the Luca Ronconi company, and was also active as a stand-up comedian. Occasionally active in films in character roles, Bosisio is best known as "Pina", the wife of Paolo Villaggio in several chapters of the Fantozzi film series. Bosisio also appeared in television roles since 1956. Since 1983, Bosisio focused her work on stage.

Bosisio is also a voice actress, notably being the Italian voice of Spank in Ohayo! Spank and Marge Simpson for the first 22 seasons of The Simpsons as well as dubbing Patty and Selma in the first 21 seasons.

== Filmography ==
=== Cinema ===
| Year | Title | Role | Notes |
|---|---|---|---|
| 1962 | March on Rome | Adelina | |
| 1962 | A Girl... and a Million | Diana | |
| 1964 | Le tardone | Carletta | Segment: "La svitata" |
| 1964 | Mondine e mondane | | |
| 1972 | Pulp | 1st Typist | |
| 1972 | Without Family | Orphanage Director | |
| 1973 | Flesh for Frankenstein | Olga | |
| 1973 | The Lady Has Been Raped | | |
| 1974 | Il lumacone | The Lodger | |
| 1975 | Fantozzi | Pina Fantozzi | |
| 1976 | Il secondo tragico Fantozzi | Pina Fantozzi | |
| 1976 | 1900 | Nella Dalcò | |
| 1977 | Black Journal | Crippled Neighbor | |
| 1980 | Sunday Lovers | Anna | Segment: "Armando's Notebook" |
| 1982 | An Ideal Adventure | Orietta Fallani | |
| 1983 | Il tassinaro | Hysterical Woman | |
| 1986 | Superfantozzi | Pina Fantozzi | |

=== Television ===
| Year | Title | Role | Notes |
|---|---|---|---|
| 1960 | Moglie | Rosa | TV film |
| 1962 | Una tragedia americana | Miss Rooney | TV miniseries |
| 1963 | La ragazza di fabbrica | | TV film |
| 1963 | Ritorna il tenente Sheridan | Vera Conrad | TV miniseries |
| 1964 | L'arma gentile | | TV film |
| 1966 | Vivere insieme | Giulia | 1 episode |
| 1966 | L'arma gentile | Giulia | 1 episode |
| 1969 | Bertoldo, Bertoldino e Cacasenno | Cacasenno | TV film |

== Voice work ==
| Year | Title | Role | Notes |
|---|---|---|---|
| 1969–1970 | Cappuccetto a pois | Cappuccetto a pois | Animated series |

=== Dubbing ===
==== Films (Animation, Italian dub) ====
| Year | Title | Role(s) | Ref |
|---|---|---|---|
| 1972 | Snoopy Come Home | Charlie Brown | |
| 1977 | The Rescuers | Ellie Mae | |
| 1982 | The Last Unicorn | Mommy Fortuna | |
| 1985 | The Care Bears Movie | Grams Bear | |
| 1988 (dubbed 2009) | My Neighbor Totoro | Granny | |
| 1996 | The Hunchback of Notre Dame | Laverne | |
| 2007 | The Simpsons Movie | Marge Simpson | |

==== Films (Live action, Italian dub) ====
| Year | Title | Role(s) | Original actor | Ref |
|---|---|---|---|---|
| 1972 | Play It Again, Sam | Nancy | Susan Anspach | |
| 1975 | Dracula in the Provinces | Olghina Franchetti | Valentina Cortese | |
| 1976 | The Career of a Chambermaid | Marcella Valmarín | Agostina Belli | |
| 1976 | Fellini's Casanova | Sister Maddalena | Margareth Clementi | |
| 1981 | Culo e camicia | Renato's mother | Carla Monti | |
| 1984 | Il ragazzo di campagna | Giovanna | Clara Colosimo | |
| 1988 | Gorillas in the Mist | Roz Carr | Julie Harris | |
| 1991 | The Love Letter | Miss Scattergoods | Geraldine McEwan | |
| 1999 | Robin Hood: Prince of Thieves | Mortianna | Geraldine McEwan | |

==== Television (Animation, Italian dub) ====
| Year | Title | Role(s) | Notes | Ref |
|---|---|---|---|---|
| 1978 | Kimba the White Lion | Coco | 1st edition | |
| 1980–1981 | X-Bomber | Bigman Lee | Main cast | |
| 1980–1981 | X-Bomber | Bloody Mary | Main cast | |
| 1982 | Doraemon | Doraemon | Main cast (1st voice) | |
| 1982 | Chappy | Don | Recurring role | |
| 1982 | Bannertail: The Story of Gray Squirrel | Banner | Main cast | |
| 1982–1983 | Tiger Mask | Ruriko Wakatsuki | 1st voice | |
| 1983 | Ohayō! Spank | Spank | Main cast (1st voice) | |
| 1989–1991 | Captain N: The Game Master | Mother Brain | Recurring role | |
| 1991–2012 | The Simpsons | Marge Simpson | Main cast (seasons 1–22) | |
| 1991–2012 | The Simpsons | Patty and Selma Bouvier | Recurring role (seasons 1–21) | |
| 1991–2012 | The Simpsons | Jacqueline Bouvier | Recurring role (seasons 1–22) | |
| 1991–2012 | The Simpsons | Aunt Gladys | 1 episode | |
| 1993 | Saban's Adventures of the Little Mermaid | Hedwig | Recurring role | |

==== Television (Live action, Italian dub) ====
| Year | Title | Role(s) | Notes | Original actor | Ref |
|---|---|---|---|---|---|
| 1980 | Rape and Marriage: The Rideout Case | Norma Joyce | TV film | Bonnie Bartlett | |
| 1982 | Little Gloria... Happy at Last | Gertrude Vanderbilt Whitney | TV miniseries | Angela Lansbury | |
| 1983 | A Caribbean Mystery | Miss Jane Marple | TV film | Helen Hayes | |
| 1988 | Mama's Family | Thelma Harper | Main cast | Vicki Lawrence | |
| 1994 | Land of the Lost | Cha-Ka | Recurring role | Phillip Paley | |

==== Video games (Italian dub) ====
| Year | Title | Role(s) | Ref |
|---|---|---|---|
| 2007 | The Simpsons Game | Marge Simpson | |
| 2007 | The Simpsons Game | Patty and Selma Bouvier | |
