= Antonio Allocca =

Italian actor (1937–2013)

- Antonio Allocca in Flatfoot in Africa (1978)
- Born: 24 June 1937; Portici, Campania, Kingdom of Italy
- Died: 31 December 2013 (aged 76); Marcianise, Campania, Italy
- Occupation: Actor
- Years active: 1956–2007
- Height: 1.63 m (5 ft 4 in)

Antonio Allocca (24 June 1937 – 31 December 2013) was an Italian character actor.

== Life and career ==
Born in Portici, Naples, Allocca debuted on stage in 1956, then in 1958, he worked with Eduardo De Filippo at the Piccolo Teatro in Milan in the comedy play Pulcinella in cerca della sua fortuna per Napoli. In 1962, he made his television debut in Ditegli sempre di sì and Napoli milionaria, both directed by De Filippo.

Very active both on stage and in films mainly in character roles, Allocca enjoyed a late success as in 1987, with the role of the professor of Italian in the three seasons of the Italia 1 television series I ragazzi della 3ª C.

Allocca died on 31 December 2013, aged 76, in Marcianise, Caserta.

== Selected filmography ==
- 1974: Farfallon – Galeotto
- 1975: Dracula in the Provinces – Peppino
- 1975: Duck in Orange Sauce – Carmine
- 1978: Flatfoot in Africa – Receptionist
- 1979: Christ Stopped at Eboli – Don Cosimino
- 1980: Café Express – Califano
- 1981: Carcerato – Pasqualino aka Fascination
- 1981: Fracchia la belva umana – Ufficiale dei Carabinieri
- 1981: Prima che sia troppo presto
- 1982: Sogni mostruosamente proibiti – La Manna
- 1982: Tradimento
- 1982: Giuramento – Pasqualino
- 1983: Bonnie and Clyde Italian Style – The Doctor
- 1983: Pappa e ciccia – Pino – the chauffeur (first story)
- 1983: Fantozzi subisce ancora - Negoziante di animali
- 1983: Il ras del quartiere
- 1984: Where's Picone?
- 1984: Così parlò Bellavista - Core 'ngrato
- 1984: Aurora (TV Movie) - Taxi Driver
- 1986: Scuola di ladri - Facoltoso contadino di Caserta
- 1986: Italian Fast Food - Esecutore giudiziario
- 1987: Quel ragazzo della curva B
- 1987-1989: I ragazzi della 3ª C (TV Series) - Professore di Italiano
- 1988: 32 dicembre - Il merciaio (segment "I penultimi fuochi")
- 1988: Casa mia, casa mia... - Judge
- 1988: Operazione pappagallo
- 1988: Fantozzi va in pensione - Esaminatore del concorso
- 1989: I Won the New Year's Lottery - Rossi
- 1990: Fantozzi alla riscossa
- 1991: Le comiche 2 - Maggiordomo
- 1992: Saint Tropez, Saint Tropez - Policeman
- 1993: Ci hai rotto papà - Umberto Tiberi
- 1994: Le nuove comiche - Orchestra conductor
- 1995: Love Story with Cramps - Proprietario della pemsione
- 1995: Croce e delizia - Jean Fumée
- 1996: Fantozzi - Il ritorno
- 1997: A spasso nel tempo – L'avventura continua - Don Peppino
- 1999: Tifosi - Zio Gaetano
- 1999: Vacanze sulla neve - Nicolino
- 1999: Pazzo d'amore - Peppino Gargiulo
- 2001: E adesso sesso - Portiere d'albergo
- 2003: Un posto al sole
