= Professor Kranz tedesco di Germania =

1978 film

- Film poster
- Directed by: Luciano Salce
- Written by: Leonardo Benvenuti; Augusto Caminito
- Produced by: Fausto Saraceni
- Starring: Paolo Villaggio
- Cinematography: Danilo Desideri
- Edited by: Antonio Siciliano
- Music by: Piero Piccioni
- Release date: 1978
- Running time: 113 minutes
- Country: Italy
- Language: Italian

Professor Kranz tedesco di Germania is a 1978 Italian comedy film directed by Luciano Salce and starring Paolo Villaggio.

Despite the title the character played by Villaggio bears little resemblance from the one he played on Italian television shows under the same moniker. Instead of a sadistic/overbearing personality Kranz is here shown with a bumbling and meek demeanor more similar to that of the other 'loser' characters in Villaggio's repertoire (Fantozzi and Fracchia).

== Plot ==
The story recounts the travesties of a German scientist/stage magician eking out a miserly life in Rio de Janeiro's favelas until getting involved in an improbable kidnapping/ransom plot.

== Cast ==
- Paolo Villaggio as Kranz
- José Wilker as Leleco
- Vittoria Chamas as Dosdores
- Maria Rosa as Raimunda
- Walter D'Ávila
- Geneson Alexandre De Souza
- Joachim Soares
- Berta Loran
- Gina Teixeira
- Fernando José
- Adolfo Celi as Carcamano
