= Ugo Bologna =

Italian actor and voice actor

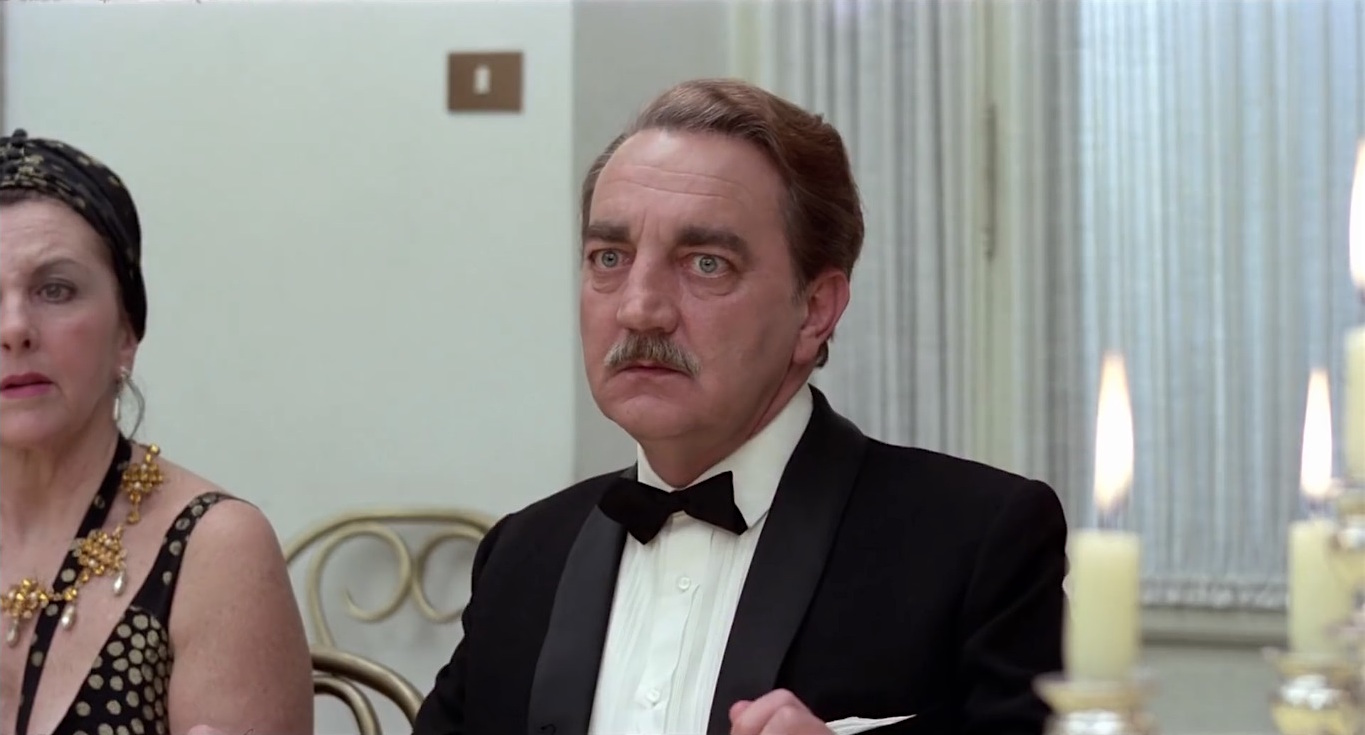
- Ugo Bologna, was an Italian actor and voice actor
- Born: 11 September 1917; Milan, Italy
- Died: 29 January 1998 (aged 80); Rome, Italy
- Occupations: Actor, voice actor
- Years active: 1950–1998
- Height: 1.70 m (5 ft 7 in)

Ugo Bologna (11 September 1917 – 29 January 1998) was an Italian actor and voice actor.

== Biography ==
Born in Milan, the son of a municipal employee and a housewife, in 1936 Bologna started working as a primary school teacher, and in 1939 he attended the course for cadet officers in the former italian city of Pula. A lieutenant during World War II, he was wounded during a battle, and then received a bronze medal for military valor.

In 1950 he decided to give up his teaching profession and devote himself to acting. After enrolling an acting course under Isabella Riva he made his stage debut with the Fantasio Piccoli's company. Even if mostly cast in character roles, Bologna was one of the most active actors in Italian cinema in 1970s and 1980s, usually in comedic roles.

Active as a voice actor, in 1970 Bologna founded in Milan the dubbing company "CDM" (Cooperativa Doppiatori Milanesi).

== Death ==
Bologna died of a heart attack on 29 January 1998 at the age of 80.

== Selected filmography ==
- Raintree County (1957) – Acciari
- Esploratori a cavallo (1961)
- Bandits in Milan (1968) – Police Official (uncredited)
- A Herdeira Rebelde (1972)
- Gang War in Milan (1973) – Judge
- The Five Days (1973) – Official at victory celebration
- L'albero dalle foglie rosa (1974)
- Killer Cop (1975) – Mancuso, Policeman
- Manhunt in the City (1975) – Policeman (uncredited)
- Faccia di spia (1975) – Salvador Allende
- Un prete scomodo (1975)
- Di che segno sei? (1975) – Commendatore Bravetta
- Una sera c'incontrammo (1975) – Galbusera
- Il secondo tragico Fantozzi (1976) – Ispettor degli Ispettori, Corrado Maria Lobbiam
- The Con Artists (1976) – Prison Warden
- Blood and Bullets (1976) – Mallory
- Passi furtivi in una notte boia (1976) – Doctor
- Movie Rush – La febbre del cinema (1976) – Producer
- Loves, Beds and Betrayals (1977) – Commendator Guido Mordacchia
- The Virgo, the Taurus and the Capricorn (1977) – Comm.Ferretti, Gianni's father (uncredited)
- A Simple Heart (1977)
- La Bidonata (1977) – Attorney
- Three Tigers Against Three Tigers (1977) – Sindaco Bossetti
- Ecco noi per esempio (1977) – Commesso nel negozio di dischi
- Il... Belpaese (1977) – Direttore della banca
- La presidentessa (1977) – Notary Piovano
- State Reasons (1978)
- Io tigro, tu tigri, egli tigra (1978)
- Piccole labbra (1978) – Franz
- Pugni, dollari e spinaci (1978)
- From Corleone to Brooklyn (1979) – Hitman (uncredited)
- Zombi 2 (1979) – Anne's Father (uncredited)
- Arrivano i gatti (1980) – Commendator Mario Bonivento
- Il viziaccio (1980)
- The Precarious Bank Teller (1980) – Morpurgo – un direttore di banca
- Ombre (1980)
- I Made a Splash (1980) – Cliente
- Nightmare City (1980) – Mr. Desmond
- Catherine and I (1980) – Passenger on airplane
- La tua vita per mio figlio (1980) – Sante Asciolla
- Spaghetti a mezzanotte (1981) – Don Vito
- Quando la coppia scoppia (1981) – Alfredo – Enrico's father
- The Mafia Triangle (1981) – TV manager
- Il falco e la colomba (1981)
- Fracchia la belva umana (1981) – Direttore della banca
- Cicciabomba (1982) – Mayor
- Journey with Papa (1982) – Ing. Mantovani
- Time for Loving (1983) – Commendator Carraro
- Sing Sing (1983) – The Producer
- Occhio, malocchio, prezzemolo e finocchio (1983) – Comm. Raggiotti
- Sapore di mare 2 - Un anno dopo (1983) – Commendator Carraro
- Il tassinaro (1983) – Milanese Builder
- Fantozzi subisce ancora (1983) – Corrado Maria Lobbiam, Ispettor degli Ispettori
- Wild beasts – Belve feroci (1984) – Inspector Nat Braun
- Yuppies (1986) – Suocero di Lorenzo
- Grandi magazzini (1986) – Dott. Tucci
- I Won the New Year's Lottery (1989)
- The Heroes (1994) – Calabrò (final film role)
