= Fantozzi alla riscossa =

- Directed by: Neri Parenti
- Written by: Leonardo Benvenuti; Piero De Bernardi; Paolo Villaggio; Neri Parenti; Alessandro Bencivenni; Domenico Saverni
- Produced by: Mario & Vittorio Cecchi Gori
- Starring: Paolo Villaggio
- Cinematography: Sandro D'Eva
- Edited by: Sergio Montanari
- Music by: Bruno Zambrini
- Distributed by: Cecchi Gori
- Release date: 1990
- Running time: 82 minutes
- Language: Italian

Fantozzi alla riscossa ("Fantozzi to the Rescue") is a 1990 Italian comedy film directed by Neri Parenti. It is the seventh chapter in the Fantozzi film series of the unlucky clerk Ugo Fantozzi, played by its creator, Paolo Villaggio.

== Plot ==
New misadventures of Accountant Fantozzi, including managing the film career of his nephew Ughina; being juror in a mafia trial; taking lessons of violence by a hooligan; facing a marriage crisis and searching a new lover through a dating service.

== Cast ==
- Paolo Villaggio as Ugo Fantozzi
- Milena Vukotic as Pina Fantozzi
- Gigi Reder as Filini
- Plinio Fernando as Mariangela Fantozzi / Uga Fantozzi
- Anna Mazzamauro as Mrs. Silvani
- Luigi Petrucci as Psychoanalyst
- Paul Muller as Duke Count Francesco Maria Barambani
- Pierfrancesco Villaggio as Hooligan
- Silvia Annichiarico as Juror
- Angelo Bernabucci as Cinecittà Producer
