= Fulvio Lucisano =

Italian film producer (1928–2026)

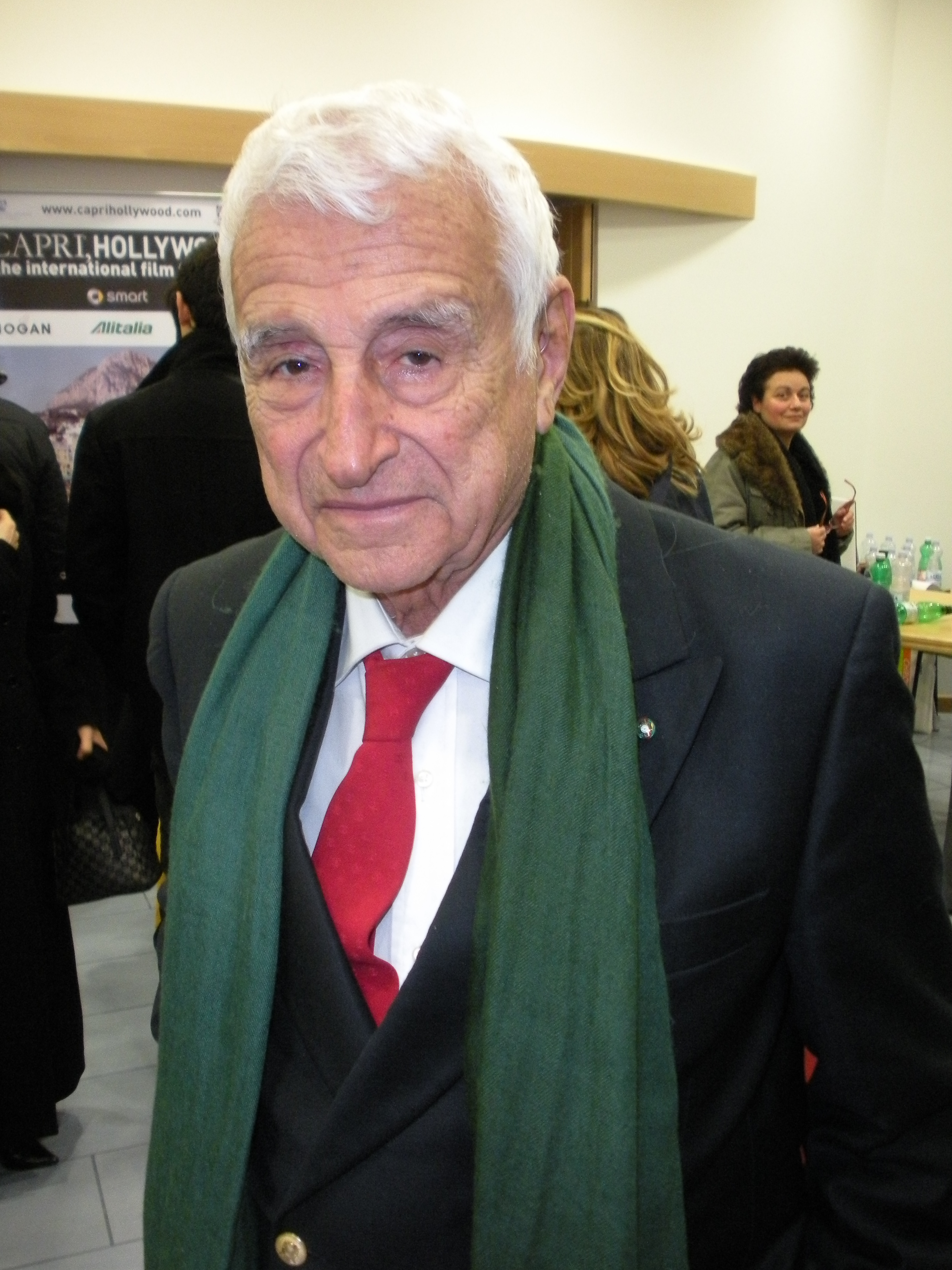
- Born: 1 August 1928; Rome, Kingdom of Italy
- Died: 18 August 2026 (aged 98); Rome, Italy
- Occupation: Film producer
- Years active: 1954–2026

Fulvio Lucisano (1 August 1928 – 18 August 2026) was an Italian film producer. In 2005, he was honoured with a retrospective ("Homage to Fulvio Lucisano") at the 62nd Venice International Film Festival. Lucisano died in Rome on 18 August 2026, at the age of 98.

== Selected filmography ==
- Warriors Five (1962)
- Berlin, Appointment for the Spies (1965)
- Planet of the Vampires (1965)
- Dr. Goldfoot and the Girl Bombs (1966)
- The Glass Sphinx (1967)
- Due croci a Danger Pass (1967)
- The Two Crusaders (1968)
- What Have You Done to Solange? (1972)
- Down the Ancient Staircase (1975)
- Blue Belle (1976)
- L'imbranato (1979)
- I'm Starting from Three (1981)
- A Proper Scandal (1984)
- Night of the Sharks (1988)
- Fantozzi – Il ritorno (1996)
- Fantozzi 2000 – La clonazione (1999)
- High Adventure (2001)
- The Sea Wolf (2001) also released as SeaWolf: The Pirate's Curse
- My Life with Stars and Stripes (2003)
- Notte prima degli esami (2006)
- Ex (2009)
- Ex – Amici come prima! (2011)
- At the Revolutionary Festival (2026)
