= Italian Fast Food =

- Directed by: Ludovico Gasparini
- Written by: Carlo Vanzina; Enrico Vanzina; Lorenzo Beccati; Ezio Greggio
- Starring: Sergio Vastano; Enzo Braschi; Susanna Messaggio
- Production companies: C. G. Silver Film; Rete Italia; Video 80
- Distributed by: Columbia Pictures Italia; C. G. Silver Film
- Release date: November 14, 1986 (Italy)
- Country: Italy
- Language: Italian

Italian Fast Food is a 1986 Italian comedy film directed by Ludovico Gasparini, and written by Carlo and Enrico Vanzina, Lorenzo Beccati and Ezio Greggio. The film is about one day in the life of an Italian fast food restaurant, with several of its customers and workers living strange adventures in and around Milan.

== Cast ==
The cast of Italian Fast Food includes:

- Enzo Braschi as Il Gran Gallo
- Gino Cogliandro as Felice
- Edoardo Romano as Peppino
- Mirko Setaro as Gaetano Accavallo
- Sergio Vastano as Salvatore LeCapre
- Carlo Pistarino as Gino
- Susanna Messaggio as Elisabetta "Betty" Casati
- Anna Galiena as Cliente sadomaso (S&M Client)
- Antonello Fassari as Marcello De Cesari
- Annabella Schiavone as Concetta
- Beatrice Ring as Silvia
- Renato Cecchetto as Regista
- Elvire Audray as Francoise
- Clara Colosimo as Madre di Robertino (Robertino's Mother)
- Luigi Petrucci as Giovanni Canavacciuolo
- Isaac George as Alessio
- Matteo Molinari as "Missile"
- Riccardo Rossi as Oreste
- Antonio Allocca as Esecutore giudiziario
- Francesco Scali as Felicetto

== Production ==
The film was inspired by the TV show Drive In, a popular two-hour show of the 1980s. A few of the characters were actually lifted from the show: Sergio Vastano and Enzo Rbaschi reprised their roles. Other roles were created for the film, using actors from the TV show - Carlo Pistarino became a delivery boy, the Trettré were the owner and two workers at the fast food, and Susanna Messaggio (the only actress who was not part of Drive In) became an acting-obsessed waitress. The role of Missile is played by Matteo Molinari, who was one of the writers on Drive In. He subsequently co-wrote the widely successful book series "Anche le Formiche nel Loro Piccolo S'Incazzano" as well as the American-based series "Oops! Movie Mistakes that Made the Cut", books about movie bloopers.

During production, Carlo Pistarino had an accident with the vehicle that was used by his character to deliver food, and the actor came out unharmed after flipping over his three-wheel car.

== Release ==
Italian Fast Food was released on November 14, 1986 in Rome, Naples, and Ancona.
