= Bonnie and Clyde Italian Style =

1983 Italian film by Steno

Bonnie e Clyde all'italiana
- Italian theatrical release poster
- Directed by: Steno
- Written by: Luciano Vincenzoni; Sergio Donati; Paolo Villaggio
- Produced by: Achille Manzotti
- Starring: Ornella Muti; Paolo Villaggio
- Cinematography: Franco Di Giacomo; Alessio Gelsini Torresi
- Edited by: Raimondo Crociani
- Music by: Guido & Maurizio De Angelis
- Release date: 17 February 1983 (Italy)
- Running time: 97 minutes
- Country: Italy
- Language: Italian

Bonnie and Clyde Italian Style (Italian: Bonnie e Clyde all'italiana), is a 1983 Italian comedy film directed by Steno.

== Plot ==
Leo and Giada are two bumbling and bungling citizens who are mistaken for dangerous bandits because of a misunderstanding by the police. In fact during a robbery Leo and Giada were involved in the theft and they're taken hostage and the police tracked down the thieves when he discovered the identity cards of the two bungling. After several chases thieves before they reach the same Leo and Giada kidnapping them again, because the two unknowingly possess an important part of the loot stolen by bandits in the first shot he saw all the characters gathered together.

== Cast ==
- Ornella Muti as Rosetta Foschini aka Giada
- Paolo Villaggio as Leo Gavazzi
- Jean Sorel as Carabinieri Captain
- Nando Murolo as the Marsigliese
- Antonio Allocca as Medico
- Fulvio Mingozzi as Dr. Dominici
- Corrado Olmi as Toy merchant

== Release ==
The film was released in Italy on February 17, 1983

== See also ==
- List of Italian films of 1983
