= Il secondo tragico Fantozzi =

- Italian theatrical release poster
- Directed by: Luciano Salce
- Written by: Leonardo Benvenuti; Piero De Bernardi; Luciano Salce; Paolo Villaggio
- Produced by: Giovanni Bertolucci
- Starring: Paolo Villaggio; Liù Bosisio; Gigi Reder; Anna Mazzamauro
- Cinematography: Erico Menczer
- Edited by: Antonio Siciliano
- Music by: Franco Bixio; Fabio Frizzi; Vince Tempera
- Distributed by: Cineriz
- Release date: 1976
- Running time: 110 min.
- Country: Italy
- Language: Italian

Il secondo tragico Fantozzi (The Second Tragic Fantozzi) is an Italian comedy film released in 1976. It is the second film in the saga of the unlucky clerk Ugo Fantozzi, played by its creator, Paolo Villaggio.

== Plot ==
Fantozzi is working overtime to protect the "Clamorous Mega-Director Duke-Count Engineer" Semenzara, (a CEO) who is cheating on his wife. Missing security guards shooting (that mistake him as a rogue), he's even "physically" forced by his colleagues to return to work in normal daylight hours.

=== Casino ===
CEO Semenzara is a very superstitious gambler and poker player. Fantozzi is chosen to accompany him to Monte Carlo, where he is forced to touch his bum, be stomped on, and drink gallons of water just for superstitious reasons. Unfortunately for Fantozzi, the Duke-Count loses all his money, blaming Fantozzi and forcing to him return home clinging for dear life under a train. Fantozzi comes back home totally immobilized, and is "cured" by Mrs. Pina with scalding cloths at a terrible temperature, causing him "mystic hallucinations" of St. Michael announcing his imminent pregnancy.

=== Hunting Party ===
Filini and Fantozzi enjoys some hunting time; unfortunately the space reserved for hunters is very tiny: with extreme competition and an almost total absence of games, manhunt skirmishes quickly begin escalating to heavy machine guns and tanks. Fantozzi and Filini fall "just" as captured safari prey.

=== Launching ship ===
Philanthropic Countess Serbelloni Mazzanti Viendalmare is selected to launch a new and massive cruise ship, but always misses targets when throwing bottles of champagne, hitting Fantozzi twice times, the Mayor, a government minister, and a centenarian baroness. Then it is decided to cut a wire as a substitution, but she misses and cuts the archbishop's pinkie toe with a hatchet, resulting in the man cursing and chasing her, swearing to kill her. That same evening, the Countess (apparently involved with the Megacorporation) organized a dinner with politicians, workers and clerks: including Fantozzi and Filini, who end up in the clutches of the giant, ferocious watchdog "Ivan the Terrible" XXXII. At dinner the two accountants, lacking social skills of any sort, botch almost everything, embarrassing their director: cruel jokes with a German ambassador, troubles with baked mockingbird and scorching-hot tomatoes. Eventually threatened again by Ivan the Terrible, Fantozzi suddenly flees in a fast Maserati, but the dog chases and confines him in the car for one week (counted by his CEO's as holidays).

=== American circus ===
In reaction to already "spending" his holidays, Fantozzi pretends to be sick to enjoy some days of paid sick leave. However a neighbor offers him free tickets for the circus, and for a change Fantozzi decides to go, knowing he's violating the terms of his sick leave. Unfortunately, he stumbles into his director, who recognizes him immediately despite Fantozzi's grotesque disguise. Hiding in a cannon, Fantozzi is fired and blown up in Sicily where, again under "mystical hallucinations", is informed by archangel Gabriel of his 9-months pregnancy.

=== Cineforum ===
The powerful Professor Riccardelli is a CEO that 20 years ago hired Fantozzi (asking anomalous questions about silent films) as a "sponge for stamps" assignment. As an avant-garde cinema enthusiast, he periodically forces his underlings to watch boring and long foreign silent films such as Day of Wrath, Man of Aran, and Battleship Potemkin, mobbing a bored Fantozzi in debate sessions after screenings while his servile and hypocritical colleagues fake enjoy the films. One of this screenings forces Megacompany clerks to miss the real-time broadcast of an important world championship soccer match. In after-movie debate, Fantozzi rides disgruntled employees, openly denouncing the movie as "a utter bullcrap" (which results in a 92 minutes-long standing ovations, "a new world record") and takes CEO Riccardelli hostage, watching B movies and destroying reels of his beloved films. Eventually the police sedate the rebellion and the clerks are forced to reenact key scenes of Battleship Potemkin every Saturday as punishment.

=== Night Club ===
Unexpectedly home alone, Fantozzi calls Calboni and Filini and organizes a night out. Following Calboni's lead, they spend the night in a club, clearly a front for prostitution, buying everything possible. The bill is astronomical (over 3000 £, $3200) and of course it's Fantozzi who sacrifices years of savings to pay. Later they can not find the money to pay for the many taxis Calboni had booked, leaving Filini to face the angry drivers. As the only one with enough money to pay a girl, Calboni betrays his wife, Miss Silvani, the longtime target of Fantozzi's unrequited love.

=== Honeymoon ===
It's the opportunity Fantozzi awaited so long and this time he finally succeeds. A scorned Miss Silvani accepts Fantozzi's proposal to elope. The two lovers land on Capri for an off-season honeymoon in the middle of December. The outcome is tragicomical, with Fantozzi such crashing on a giant sea stack (Capri faraglioni), and falling short of Calboni in every way. After the umpteenth incident, Fantozzi heads back to the, obscenely expensive, hotel suite where he finds out Silvani and Calboni have reconciled; a dejected Fantozzi, attempting suicide, is caught by a fishing boat and sold as a "seafood". Then he is bought by his wife Pina, returning home safe and sound and just in time to celebrate Christmas. Fantozzi is positive, and in an evening call by Galactic Mega-Director is offered back his old job, from which he was fired from before the honeymoon. The unfortunate accountant resumes work in his company, but this time as a lightning rod.

== See also ==
- List of Italian films of 1976
