= The Precarious Bank Teller =

- Directed by: Luciano Salce
- Written by: Luciano Salce; Ottavio Alessi; Augusto Caminito
- Produced by: Augusto Caminito
- Starring: Paolo Villaggio; Catherine Spaak; Anna Mazzamauro; Gigi Reder; Enrica Bonaccorti; Vincenzo Crocitti; Anna Maria Rizzoli
- Cinematography: Sergio Rubini
- Edited by: Antonio Siciliano
- Music by: Piero Piccioni
- Release date: 1980
- Running time: 92 min
- Country: Italy
- Language: Italian

The Precarious Bank Teller (Italian: Rag. Arturo De Fanti, bancario precario) is a 1980 Italian comedy film directed by Luciano Salce.

== Plot ==
Arturo De Fanti is an accountant with business troubles who tries to help his economically straitened lover by introducing her (in disguise) into the home he shares with his wife. The deception does not succeed.

== Cast ==
- Paolo Villaggio as Accountant Arturo De Fanti
- Catherine Spaak as Elena
- Anna Maria Rizzoli as Vanna
- Gigi Reder as Willy
- Anna Mazzamauro as Selvaggia
- Carlo Giuffrè as Libero Catena
- Vincenzo Crocitti as Ciuffini
- Enrica Bonaccorti as Smeralda
- Ugo Bologna as Morpurgo

== See also ==
- List of Italian films of 1980
