= Fantozzi 2000 – La clonazione =

Fantozzi 2000 - La clonazione
- Directed by: Domenico Saverni
- Written by: Paolo Villaggio; Alessandro Bencivenni; Domenico Saverni
- Produced by: Vittorio Cecchi Gori; Rita Rusic; Fulvio Lucisano; Federica Lucisano
- Starring: Paolo Villaggio; Milena Vukotic; Anna Mazzamauro
- Edited by: Raimondo Crociani
- Music by: Alessandro Bencivenni; Domenico Saverni
- Release date: 24 December 1999 (Italy)
- Running time: 100 minutes
- Country: Italy
- Language: Italian

Fantozzi 2000 – La clonazione (Fantozzi 2000 - The cloning) is an Italian comedy film released in 1999. It is the tenth and final film in the saga of the unlucky clerk Ugo Fantozzi, played by its creator, Paolo Villaggio.

== Plot ==
Fantozzi finally died after his brief return to Earth from 1996. His superiors, exceeded the limits of human longevity, continue to manage and direct their institutions, taking many young people. However, new employees did not show very servile and humble like the old assumptions of previous generations. In fact, it is approaching the 21st century and young people are starting to be more aggressive and arrogant towards their managers who, finding himself in danger, decided to revive the "accountant doormat" Ugo Fantozzi. They do this by cloning and so the poor Fantozzi is forced again to continue a life of abuse and unfortunate vicissitudes. In particular his old Count Director Engineer Mascalzon. Grand. Croc. Lup. Mann. Farabutt. Pezz. di Merd. Duke Balabam (In Italy as in political offices, administrative and directorial are written in abbreviated form, Paolo Villaggio universe Fantozzi to label the directors in a negative way, as their crooks and thieves, gives them their titles and honors vulgar and scurrilous) forces him to follow her nephew Angelo which instead become bad and cheat like the father wants to do good. Fantozzi will do everything to follow the good cheer of pure still young, but the manager finds out and makes him flogged. Subsequent adventures in the tragic Fantozzi, together with Pina, mad as all Italians for the new distribution of lottery, betting various coupons. One day out the winning combination established by Fantozzi and so he immediately took the opportunity to buy a luxury medieval castle together with Miss Silvani, completely forgetting his wife Pina. At the end Fantozzi find that the board, given to the wife because the played, was not valid and will lose everything. After a tragic encounter with a male stripper loved madly by granddaughter Uga, since Fantozzi to follow in the disco had disguised himself as a teenager, ending up in bed with the robust and sensual young man who had exchanged Ugo for a real woman, the bumbling accountant prepares to celebrate the New Year of 2000. He plans to go on vacation on a tropical island with his wife, but the Contessa Serbelloni Mazzanti Come From the Sea (Vien Dal Mare) sends him an invitation to celebrate her birthday 144 years! Fantozzi is presented in the guise of Napoleon Bonaparte with his wife, but discovers that his namesake was the real guest of the party.

== Cast ==
- Paolo Villaggio as Ugo Fantozzi
- Milena Vukotic as Pina Fantozzi
- Anna Mazzamauro as Miss Silvani
- Paolo Paoloni as Duke Count Balabam
- Dodi Conti as Uga Fantozzi
- Stefano Masciarelli as the impresario
- Irma Capece Minutolo as Countess Serbelloni Mazzanti Vien dal Mare
- Aldo Ralli as the scientist
- Guido Nicheli as the teacher

== Reception ==
The film received a negative assessment from the Commissione Nazionale Valutazione Film deeming the Ugo Fantozzi franchise was getting more and more vulgar and inconsistent. A review in La Repubblica, on the other hand, found that Fantozzi 2000 – La clonazione was "still talking about things that concern us"
