= Fantozzi (film) =

- Original theatrical release poster
- Directed by: Luciano Salce
- Written by: Paolo Villaggio; Leo Benvenuti; Piero De Bernardi; Luciano Salce
- Produced by: Giovanni Bertolucci
- Starring: Paolo Villaggio; Gigi Reder; Liù Bosisio; Anna Mazzamauro
- Narrated by: Paolo Villaggio
- Cinematography: Erico Menczer
- Edited by: Amedeo Salfa
- Music by: Fabio Frizzi
- Distributed by: Cineriz
- Release date: 1975
- Running time: 103 minutes: 98 minutes (cut edition)
- Language: Italian

Fantozzi is a 1975 Italian satirical film, based on 1971 novel of the same name in the saga of the unlucky Italian accountant employee Ugo Fantozzi, written and played by his creator Paolo Villaggio.

The film is a parody of middle class workers of the 1970s, unhappy and frustrated at work and with family, and is known for its use of surreal humour and for several scenes which have entered popular culture.

The success of this movie rendered it a cult film that topped IT box office on sales for eight months. In the decades since its release, the film's reputation has remained almost unmutated, launching Paolo Villaggio's career. Its success led to a franchise of nine sequels, from 1976 to 1999.

In 2008, the film was included on the Italian Ministry of Cultural Heritage’s 100 Italian films to be saved, a list of 100 films that "have changed the collective memory of the country between 1942 and 1978."

== Plot ==
In the prologue, miss Pina Fantozzi calls "ItalPetrolCementThermoTextilPharmMetalChemical" holding (simplified as "Mega-Company") where her husband works, demanding news of her husband since she hasn't had any news from him in eighteen days: Fantozzi is casually found walled into the company's old bathroom. Nobody in this time lapse had any idea where he was.

=== Going to work ===
In order to get to punch his badge at 08:30, 16 years earlier Fantozzi began setting the alarm clock at 06:15. Today, after continuous experiments and improvements, he managed to set it at 07:51, the limit of humanly possibile. Everything is calculated by the second: 5 seconds to regain consciousness; 4 seconds to overcome the impact of seeing his wife, and 6 more seconds to ask himself -as always with any plausible answer- whatever pushed him to marry that kind of curious pet; 3 seconds to drink Mrs Fantozzi's coffee: 3000 °F ! From 8 to 10 seconds to cool down his burned tongue... 2.5 seconds to kiss his daughter Mariangela; brioche and Latte while hair brushing, brushing coffee-flavoured teeth with minty toothpaste, resulting in an instantaneous bowel movement... all of this performed in 6 seconds, a European Record! He still has a 3-minute window to get dressed and run to the bus stop to catch the 08:01 bus. Of course, this is possible without tragic unforeseen circumstances...

— Fantozzi's narrator voice.

The first episode shows Fantozzi's morning routine to go to work; he is bound to be late because of one of those "tragic unforeseen circumstances", so he decides to catch the bus "in the gliding way", by jumping from his balcony to the street and waiting for it. Running frantically towards the clocking machine, with his colleagues urging him on (though he's not 'helped' as he would be then "disqualified" just like marathon man Dorando Pietri). He makes it and then passes out.

=== Miss Silvani ===
Miss Silvani is an attractive colleague of Fantozzi's and impossible love. In an occasion, while attending megacompany's president funeral ("prematurely disappeared at the young age of 126 years"), Fantozzi asks Miss Silvani out for lunch. She accepts, but Fantozzi ends up getting into trouble as, while he's at the wheel of his tiny Bianchina she picks up a fight with the driver (a rageful Fidel-like thug) of an Opel Kadett. Fantozzi gets beaten up, and his car badly damaged.

=== Football match ===
In this third part (seemingly a flashback sequence), Fantozzi plays in a football match between colleagues, organised by his colleague Filini, in which married men play against single men, on a terrible, muddy pitch. All players have their "clerk cloud" (evil personal clouds who persecute them in holidays, raining uninterruptedly). After two Fantozzi's own goal and a "mystic vision" of Saint Peter (who caught Fantozzi when in harsh troubles), the match eventually get abandoned because of waterlogged pitch, that turns more like a swamp.

=== Camping ===
In fourth episode (likely another flashback), Filini convinced Fantozzi to buy a small motor boat for a camping trip near Bracciano, but they cause an accident again the Minister of Petroleum from an ignote French-speaking African country, being punished in loco: 100 lashes with leather baldrics. After this little "mishap" the two arrive in camp late at night, where they are rebuked by a group of German tourists. In an attempt to pitch a tent, planting stakes, Filini pounds unintentionally (surely for his almost total blindness) twice a finger Fantozzi, forcing him to run away very far away to scream monstrously in order to avoid reprimands by German tourists. The morning after clumsily attempts to fish, but by taking a running start to throw the barrel, the lines get tangled and the two are linked at the bottom of the boat: under a burning heat, begins hallucinations: Filini feels like being Ulysses, starting to hear sirens while Fantozzi dreams of Jesus walking on the water wondering if we are to multiply bread and fish and complaining because they do not have any. Very thirsty and dehydrated, the two are also mocked by the "clerk cloud" that drains water far from them.

=== Christmas ===
In fifth episode, all the company employees' children have to go to the director's office and tell a poem they made up for Christmas. Fantozzi's daughter Mariangela gets insulted for her terrible, monkey-like ugliness (also to her monkey-like reaction). Fantozzi breaks in and silently shames his "superior" managers, however wishing them "merry Christmas and happy new year" in an extremely formal, business letter-like manner. Questioned about why she was called "Cheeta", Fantozzi tells her a white lie pretending they were actually comparing her to "Cheeta Hayworth".

This is one event where the human and moral stature of Fantozzi elevate him from his servilism, although in a very subtle way.

=== New Year's Eve ===
Sixth episode. It is New Year's Eve, and Fantozzi goes to a New Year's Eve party (organized by a proud and excited Filini) with his colleagues. Everything is a disaster: a troublesome waiter throws every plate over Fantozzi's suit, he falls through a window during the dance and the band leader rigs the clock (to go to another party!) and runs away at half past ten. At midnight, someone throws a heavy cooking machine (it is a Neapolitan tradition to throw old pieces of furniture out of windows) over Fantozzi's car, destroying it.

=== Snooker match ===
Seventh episode. Fantozzi's new director, Honorable Knight Earl Diego Catellami, is a billiard enthusiast who is known to promote employees who lose against him, a characteristic instantaneously exploited by Fantozzi's extremely servile colleague geometrist Calboni. He also forces his underlings to worship a statue of his old mother. At first, Fantozzi refuses this humiliation, but later, hoping for a career advancement, Fantozzi undergoes secret billiard training, in order to make his eventual defeat look credible (he even makes up proof that he is cheating on Pina in order not to tell her about the training). Catellami challenges Fantozzi to a game of five-pin at his house after Fantozzi starts to insult his mother's statue (due to continuously hitting his head against it while bowing in front of it). Fantozzi initially underperforms (possibly on purpose), much to the amusement of his boss and the other connivent colleagues, who start insulting him and laughing even when he has a good play (dismissing it as luck rather than "class"). Motivated by the grief of his own wife witnessing his humiliation, Fantozzi reveals his master skills and defeats Catellami in extremis. The director is enraged, so Fantozzi abducts Catellami's mother, demanding a huge ransom yet abandoning the old woman who has fallen in love with her captor.

=== Tennis match ===
Eighth episode. Fantozzi (trying to lose weight by doing sport) and Filini enjoy a tennis match, at 6 AM in a freeze and foggy day: every other time slot is reserved to high-class persons in a crescendo of nobility. The match ends disastrously, with Fantozzi knocking himself out and Filini fainting after breaking the net.

=== The Japanese restaurant ===
Ninth episode. Fantozzi buys a clothe capable of mailing him look slimmer and younger, and invites Miss Silvani to a Japanese cuisine restaurant where, due to a misunderstanding with a waiter (the restaurant's staff only speak strict Japanese), Miss Silvani's Pekingese dog Pierugo is cooked and served as a dish. Japanese culinary uses are badly shown and received from both two: rice instead of bread, a primitive sashimi fished at the moment from restaurant's aquarium and two tough samurai guards punishing clients for every mistake they make. The dinner ends as Miss Silvani both discovers that Fantozzi has not really got slimmer and sees Pierugo being served. Fantozzi suffers what seems to be a sort of nervous breakdown, trying to commit suicide first by harakiri and then by drowning in the aquarium, but fails.

=== The trip on Alps ===
Tenth episode. Forgiveness from Silvani (for the "killed" dog) forces Fantozzi to follow her on Courmayeur with Calboni. Caused by cold and Calboni's "monstrous lies", Fantozzi falls to "competitive hallucinations" and claims he has been a national team-level skier (informing also he's not been skiing for 35 years). Invited to a party by Countess Serbelloni Mazzanti Vien dal Mare (whom Fantozzi previously served), Fantozzi, after drinking two litres of beer, explodes in a powerful burp causing a terrible avalanche, only to later fall in an enormous container of polenta and sausages, and being served with it (he later dismisses this as a prank). After a disastrous skiing session using archaic wooden ski set, Fantozzi is humiliated noting Calboni and Miss Silvani in love.

=== The Galactic Mega-director ===
Frustrated and heartbroken, Fantozzi is granted a request to move to another office. His new officemate, a staunch communist, indoctrinates Fantozzi with marxist theories, eventually turning him against Mega-company, whom Fantozzi now regards as a privileged and exploitative elite. After smashing a window, Fantozzi is summoned by the Galactic Mega-director, the highest authority in the company. Using his condescending political rhetoric and deceptive displays of clemency, the director persuades Fantozzi to return to his docile and humble self, convincing him of a somewhat divine nature of the higher corporate ranks. In return for his act of contrition, Fantozzi is allowed to touch the director's chair made of human leather and to swim in his personal aquarium, where selected faithful employees replace fishes.
