= Paolo Villaggio =

Italian actor, comedian, film director, and writer (1932–2017)

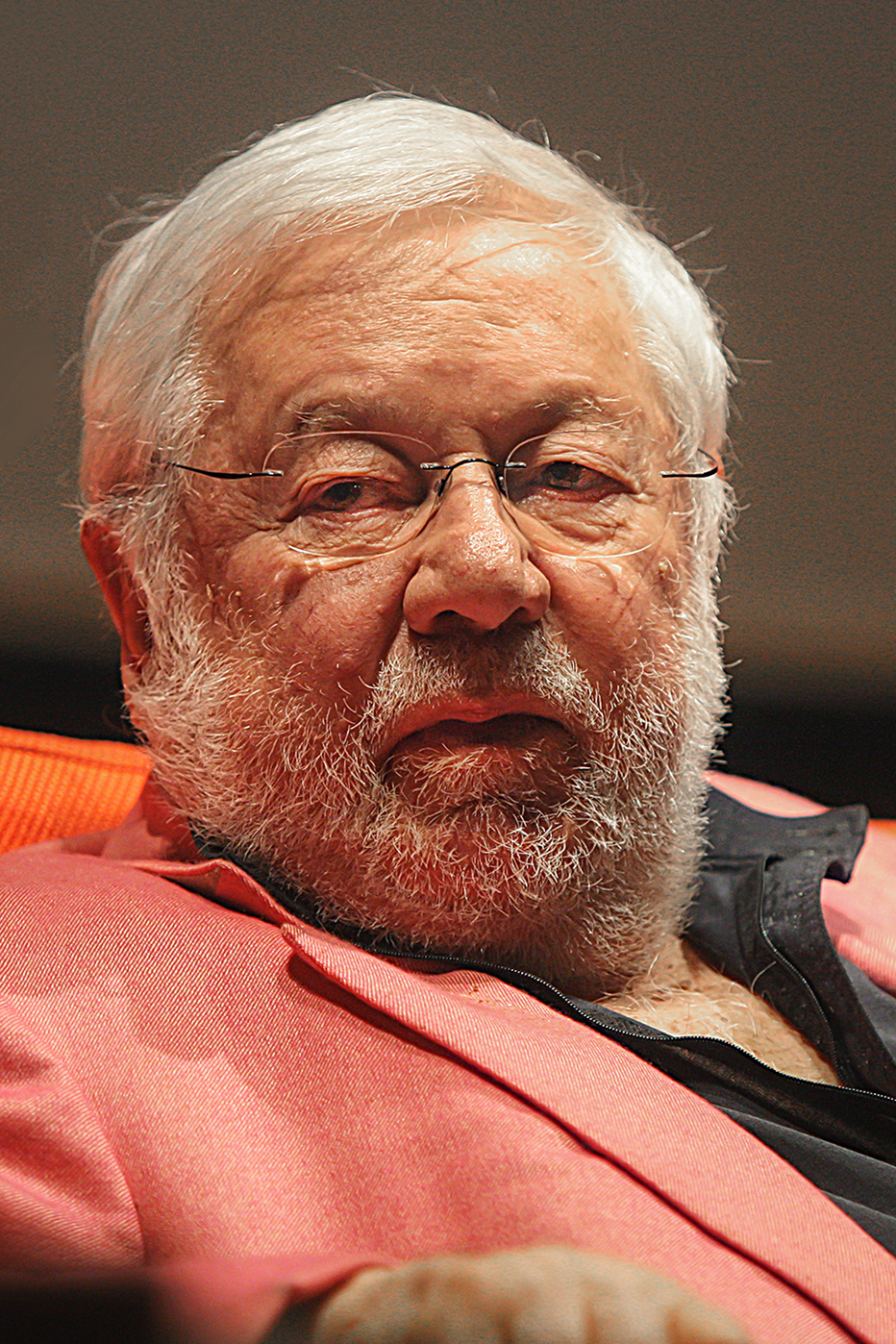
- Villaggio in 2012
- Born: 30 December 1932; Genoa, Kingdom of Italy
- Died: 3 July 2017 (aged 84); Rome, Italy
- Resting place: Sori Cemetery
- Occupations: Actor; comedian; film director; writer
- Years active: 1956–2017
- Political party: Proletarian Democracy (1987); Pannella List (1992–1999)
- Spouse: Maura Albites (m. 1958)
- Children: 2

Paolo Villaggio (Italian: [ˈpaːolo vilˈladdʒo]; 30 December 1932 – 3 July 2017) was an Italian actor, comedian, film director, and writer. He is noted for the characters he created with paradoxical and grotesque characteristics: Professor Kranz, the ultra-timid Giandomenico Fracchia, and the obsequious and meek accountant Ugo Fantozzi, perhaps the favourite character in Italian comedy. He wrote several books, usually of satirical character. He also acted in dramatic roles, and appeared in several movies.

== Early life ==
Paolo Villaggio was born in Genoa, to Ettore Villaggio (1905–1992), a surveyor originally from Palermo, and Maria, originally from Venice, a German-language teacher. Paolo had a twin brother, Piero, who taught at the University of Pisa.

From there, Villaggio was hired for the TV programme Quelli della domenica (The Sunday guys), in which Fantozzi made his first appearance, introduced his characters, the aggressive "Professor Kranz" and the hypocritical "Giandomenico Fracchia".

== Career ==
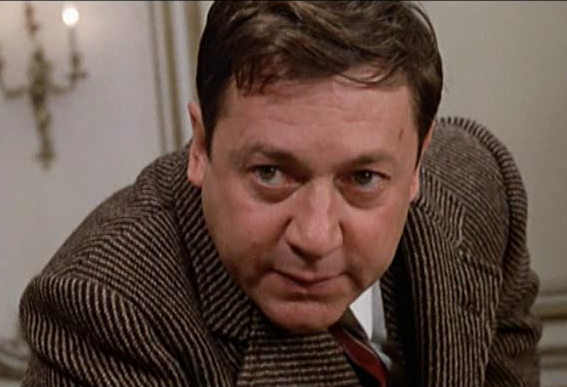
Villaggio as Fantozzi

=== Awards ===
He received several cinema awards, including the David di Donatello (1990), the Nastro d'Argento (1992) and the Golden Lion for his entire career (1992).

=== Fantozzi ===
After his television experience, Villaggio started writing, for the magazines L'Espresso and L'Europeo, short stories featuring accountant Ugo Fantozzi, a man with a weak character, dogged by misfortune and by the "mega-director" of the "mega-company" where he works. In 1971, the publishing house Rizzoli released the book Fantozzi, a collection of these stories, which sold over a million copies, followed soon by the sequel Il secondo tragico libro di Fantozzi.

The first book received the Gogol Prize in Moscow and led to his 1975 appearance in the film Fantozzi, directed by Luciano Salce. The film's success led to a sequel, Il secondo tragico Fantozzi, with the same director in the following year, in which Fantozzi delivered his most famous line: "Per me... La corazzata Kotiomkin [sic] ... è una cagata pazzesca!!!", or roughly "As I see it... Battleship Kotiomkin [sic]... is an unbelievable load of crap!!!".

Six sequel books were then released, with the last one published in 2012. Eight other films followed, which ended in 1999, but were often much less based on the short stories and the books.

=== Other films ===
Villaggio played in numerous comedies. He was directed by Federico Fellini (La voce della luna, 1990, with Roberto Benigni), Lina Wertmüller (Io speriamo che me la cavo, 1992), by Ermanno Olmi (The Secret of the Old Woods, 1993), by Mario Monicelli (Cari fottutissimi amici, 1994), and by Gabriele Salvatores (Denti, 2000).

Villaggio continued writing while acting in films. He moved to the Mondadori publishing house in 1994. He published Fantozzi saluta e se ne va (1994–1995; "Fantozzi Says Goodbye and Leaves"), Vita morte e miracoli di un pezzo di merda ("Life, Death and Miracles of a Piece of Shit", 2002), 7 grammi in 70 anni ("7 Grammes in 70 Years", 2003) and his latest, Sono incazzato come una belva ("I'm Fucking Mad as a Beast") in 2004.

He also acted in stage plays, playing Arpagone in L'Avare of Molière in 1996. In 1996 he conducted the satirical news bulletin Striscia la notizia (broadcast on Canale 5), together with Massimo Boldi. More recently, he participated in the television fiction Carabinieri, in which he played the role of a tramp who often helped the police to solve crimes. Villaggio was also a lyricist. With fellow Genoan Fabrizio De André, he wrote two songs, "Carlo Martello torna dalla battaglia di Poitiers" ("Charles Martel returning from the Battle of Poitiers") and "Il fannullone" ("The Loafer").

== Death ==
Villaggio died on 3 July 2017 from complications of diabetes in Rome at the age of 84.

== Films ==
- I quattro del pater noster (1969)
- Pensando a te (1969)
- Il terribile ispettore (1969)
- Eat It (1969)
- Brancaleone at the Crusades (1970)
- Without Family (1972)
- Beati i ricchi (1972)
- What Am I Doing in the Middle of a Revolution? (1972)
- La torta in cielo (1973)
- Don't Touch the White Woman! (1974)
- Sistemo l'America e torno (1974)
- Alla mia cara mamma nel giorno del suo compleanno (1974)
- La mazurka del barone, della santa e del fico fiorone (1975)
- Fantozzi (1975)
- Di che segno sei? (1975)
- Il secondo tragico Fantozzi (1976)
- Goodnight, Ladies and Gentlemen (1976)
- Mr. Robinson (1976)
- Strage Occasion (1976)
- Three Tigers Against Three Tigers (1977)
- Il... Belpaese (1977)
- Io tigro, tu tigri, egli tigra (1978)
- Where Are You Going on Holiday? (1978)
- Quando c'era lui... caro lei! (1978)
- Professor Kranz tedesco di Germania (1978)
- Dr. Jekyll Likes Them Hot (1979)
- The Precarious Bank Teller (1979)
- La locandiera (1980)
- Fantozzi contro tutti (1980; also director)
- Il turno (1981)
- Fracchia la belva umana (1981)
- Sogni mostruosamente proibiti (1983)
- Bonnie and Clyde Italian Style (1983)
- Pappa e ciccia (1982)
- Fantozzi subisce ancora (1983)
- A tu per tu (1984)
- Sogni e bisogni (1984, TV Mini-Series)
- I pompieri (1985)
- Fracchia contro Dracula (1985)
- Scuola di ladri (1986)
- Grandi magazzini (1986)
- Superfantozzi (1986)
- Rimini Rimini (1987)
- Missione eroica – I pompieri 2 (1987)
- Scuola di ladri - Parte seconda (1987)
- Roba da ricchi (1987)
- Come è dura l'avventura (1987)
- Il volpone (1988)
- Fantozzi va in pensione (1988)
- I Won the New Year's Lottery (1989)
- The Voice of the Moon (1990)
- Le comiche (1990)
- Fantozzi alla riscossa (1990)
- Le comiche 2 (1992)
- Ciao, Professore! (1992)
- Io speriamo che me la cavo (1992)
- The Secret of the Old Woods (1993)
- Fantozzi in paradiso (1993)
- Le nuove comiche (1994)
- Dear Goddamned Friends (1994)
- Camerieri (1995)
- I Don't Speak English (1995)
- Snowball (1995)
- Fantozzi - Il ritorno (1996)
- Banzai (1997)
- Un bugiardo in paradiso (1998)
- Per motivi di famiglia (1998)
- Fantozzi 2000 – La clonazione (1999)
- Azzurro (2000)
- Denti (2000)
- The Apocalypse
- Heidi (2001)
- Renzo e Lucia (2004)
- InvaXön - Alieni in Liguria (2004)
- Gas (2005)
- Hermano (2007)
- Torno a vivere da solo (2008)
- A Question of the Heart (2009)
- Generation 1000 Euros (2009)
- Tutto tutto niente niente (2012)
- W gli sposi (2018) (final film role; posthumous release)

== Theater ==
- Avaro, directed by Giorgio Strehler (1996)
- Delirio di un povero vecchio (2000–2001)
- Vita, morte e miracoli (also directed) (2005–2008)
- Serata d'addio, directed by Andrea Buscemi (2007–2008)
- Il profumo delle lucciole (also directed) (2009–2011)
- A ruota libera (also directed) (2010–2011)
- La Corazzata Potëmkin (2012)

== Bibliography ==
- Fantozzi (1971)
- Come farsi una cultura mostruosa (1972)
- Il secondo tragico libro di Fantozzi (1974)
- Le lettere di Fantozzi (1976)
- Fantozzi contro tutti (1979)
- Fantozzi subisce ancora (1983)
- Rag. Ugo Fantozzi: "Caro direttore ti scrivo...". Lettere del tragicomico ragioniere (1993)
- Fantozzi saluta e se ne va: le ultime lettere del rag. Ugo Fantozzi (1994)
- Vita morte e miracoli di un pezzo di merda (The Paolo Villaggio autobiography) (2002)
- 7 grammi in 70 anni (2003)
- Sono incazzato come una belva (2004)
- Gli fantasmi (2006)
- Storia della libertà di pensiero (2008)
- Storie di donne straordinarie (2009)
- Fantozzi totale (2010)
- Crociera Lo Cost (2010)

== Awards ==
- David di Donatello for Best Actor The Voice of the Moon (1990)
- Golden Lion Honorary Award (1992)
- Nastro d'Argento for Best Actor, The Secret of the Old Woods (1994)
- Commander of the Order of Merit of the Italian Republic from Presidency of the Ministry Council (2 June 1995)
- Leopard of Honour (2000)
- Honorary David di Donatello Award (2009)
- Premio Grock from Città di Imperia (2011)
