= Vieni avanti cretino =

- Directed by: Luciano Salce
- Written by: Roberto Leoni; Franco Bucceri; Lino Banfi
- Starring: Lino Banfi
- Cinematography: Erico Menczer
- Edited by: Antonio Siciliano
- Music by: Fabio Frizzi
- Release date: 1982
- Country: Italy
- Language: Italian

Vieni avanti cretino (Come On Idiot) is a 1982 Italian comedy film directed by Luciano Salce.

It had a great commercial success, grossing over 3 billion lire at the Italian box office.

== Cast ==
- Lino Banfi: Pasquale Baudaffi
- Franco Bracardi: Gaetano Baudaffi
- Anita Bartolucci: Marisa
- Dada Gallotti: Dentista
- Gigi Reder: Ingegnere dal dentista
- Michela Miti: Carmela
- Dino Cassio: Don Peppino
- Nello Pazzafini: Salvatore Gargiulo
- Adriana Russo: Ragazza al bar
- Alfonso Tomas: Dr. Tomas
- Luciana Turina: Padrona del barboncino

== See also ==
- List of Italian films of 1982
