= Ugo Fantozzi =

- Fantozzi character
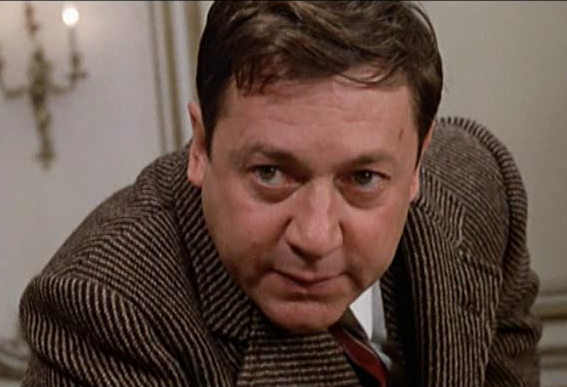
- Ugo Fantozzi (Paolo Villaggio) in the film Fantozzi, during the iconic five-pin match scene
- First appearance: Fantozzi (1971 novel); Fantozzi (1975 film)
- Last appearance: Fantozzi 2000 – La clonazione (1999 film); Tragica vita del ragionier Fantozzi (2012 novel)
- Created by: Paolo Villaggio

In-universe information
- Nicknames: Pupazzi, Fantocci, Bambocci, Bagherozzi, Beccacci, Cagnacci, Mortacci, Fantozzo and Tozzi-Fan (mistakenly); Puccettone (by Calboni)
- Species: Human
- Occupation: Accountant
- Spouse: Pina Fantozzi (surname never mentioned)
- Children: Mariangela Fantozzi (daughter)
- Relatives: Uga Fantozzi (granddaughter)
- Nationality: Italian
- Race: Caucasian

Ugo Fantozzi (pronounced [ˈuːɡo fanˈtɔttsi]) is a fictional character, appearing in Italian literature and film, created by Paolo Villaggio. The character, initially part of Villaggio's television monologues, later became the protagonist of a series of short stories published at first in newspapers, later in collections, which in turn inspired a successful film series starring Villaggio himself as the main character.

Of the many films telling of Fantozzi's misadventures, the most notable and famous were Fantozzi (1975) and Il secondo tragico Fantozzi (1976), both directed by Luciano Salce, but many others were produced. The other films were Fantozzi contro tutti (1980) directed by Neri Parenti, Fantozzi subisce ancora (1983) by Neri Parenti, Superfantozzi (1986) by Neri Parenti, Fantozzi va in pensione (1988) by Neri Parenti, Fantozzi alla riscossa (1990) by Neri Parenti, Fantozzi in paradiso (1993) by Neri Parenti, Fantozzi – Il ritorno (1996) by Neri Parenti and Fantozzi 2000 – La clonazione (1999) by Domenico Saverni.

Although Villaggio's movies tend to bridge comedy with a more elevated social satire, this character had a great impact on Italian society, to such a degree that the adjective fantozziano entered the lexicon. Ugo Fantozzi represents the archetype of the average Italian of the 1970s, middle-class with a simple lifestyle with the anxieties common to an entire class of workers, being re-evaluated by critics. For the 40th anniversary of the character's debut in cinema, in 2015, the first two films were restored and re-proposed in theaters.

== Origins ==
The character, born as a representation of the inept and unfortunate man victim of bullying, has entered the social imaginary for his grotesque aptitude for psychological subjection to power and as an example of an average man oppressed by society and constantly looking for redemption, "the prototype of the wretch, or the quintessence of nullity", as Paolo Villaggio himself defined it.

Fantozzi was the surname of a colleague of Villaggio's at a company where the actor had worked as an employee, Italimpianti, and which got involved in the initiatives of Villaggio himself, which he incorrectly called "Selvaggio". Another character created by Villaggio is travel organizer Giandomenico Fracchia, and accountant Filini for the stories and films of Fantozzi.

In the stories of Villaggio, among the colleagues of the character, there are in fact two characters, Filini and Fracchia, who in the films were later replaced, due to an intuition of the director Luciano Salce, with only Filini, who would have the role of the best friend of the protagonist and of the organizer who thinks he understands everything.

From his work experiences, Villaggio drew inspiration to write some stories published in L'Europeo magazine and which was collected in the book Fantozzi (1971). The book became a bestseller, selling more than a million copies, being translated into many languages, and won the Gogol prize in the "best humorous work" section. Given the great success of the book, a film adaptation was created in which the role of the protagonist will be played by Villaggio himself.

== Character debut ==
The character makes his debut in Paolo Villaggio's monologues, in which he is quoted in the third person. Villaggio made his debut on television in 1968 on the program Quelli della Domenica, in the role of the character, the protagonist of sketches in which he tells humorous stories with a particular and characteristic lexicon of the character based on hyperbole.

== The character ==
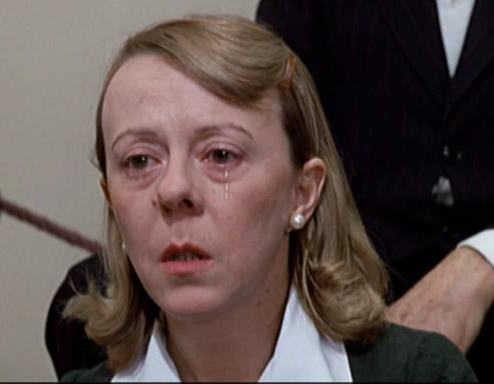
Pina Fantozzi (Liù Bosisio), wife of Ugo Fantozzi, in the film Fantozzi

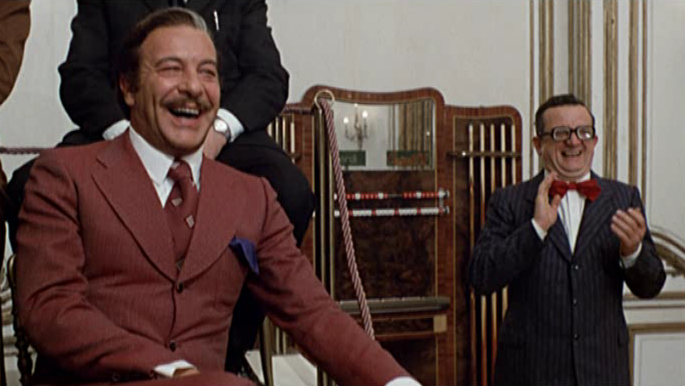
Surveyor Calboni (Giuseppe Anatrelli, left) and accountant Filini (Gigi Reder, right), colleagues of Ugo Fantozzi, in the film Fantozzi

The character is a living hyperbole, an excess, in which the humanity of the character is overwhelmed by the misfortunes from which he is invested and to which he does not react in the slightest. The mediocrity with which the character is described, which over time becomes the emblem of the overwhelmed man, inevitably leads to a representation of his vulgarity, with burping, foul language, negative attitudes (such as servility), which make it comical and tragic at the same time. Another characteristic is that of continually apologizing and having to submit to everyone. The common denominator of all the events experienced by the character is the total inertia before fate, the impossibility of being able to dispute the adverse fate.

His family, the only refuge from the oppression of a society that does not recognize him as an effective member except to exploit him, is made up of an insignificant and ugly wife, Pina Fantozzi, who does not love him but at best respects and pities him and has feelings of sufficiency for him, and a narrow-minded, monkey-looking daughter, Mariangela Fantozzi.

Fantozzi, despite the harassment, has as his only acquaintances his colleagues from the Megaditta ("Mega-Company"), whom he also frequents outside working hours. He takes time off with them, celebrates the New Year with them by participating in a party set up in a squalid basement in which a cheating orchestra conductor keeps the clocks moving forward and anticipates the celebration to be able to go and play at two parties, goes with them on itinerant trips in improvised campers, in improbable bicycle races, in football matches on muddy fields in the suburbs or in pathetic tennis matches, such as the one at six in the morning on a Sunday with a late-autumn character with the accountant Filini, who is in fact his best friend, and with whom he also has an adventure by clumsy campers on the lake. Worthy of mention, among the other colleagues of the "Megaditta", is the surveyor Calboni, careerist and pimp towards his superiors, as well as unrepentant womanizer of the group.

Fantozzi always suffers harassment and mistreatment from colleagues and his superiors without ever complaining. However, in some rare cases he assumes attitudes of open rebellion, as in the film Fantozzi, when he breaks a glass of the Megaditta with a stone, or as in Il secondo tragico Fantozzi when he attacks Professor Riccardelli.

Fantozzi's bad luck shows up even after he passes away (in the movie Fantozzi in paradiso), as on the way to paradise, the divine airplane carrying him is hijacked by Buddhist terrorists seeking revenge for terrorism against them before death. In front of Buddha, who comically decides using a wheel of fortune (which leads Fantozzi to refer to him as "Mike"), he is sentenced to living his whole previous life once again.

The name of Fantozzi is for the first time satirically altered in "Fantocci", so called because it means "made of rags". His colleagues and managers continue to create more humiliating nicknames for Fantozzi: Pupazzi, Fantocci, Bambocci, Bagherozzi, Beccacci, Cagnacci, Mortacci, Fantozzo and Tozzi-Fan. The surveyor Calboni instead nicknames Fantozzi "Puccettone".

== Setting ==
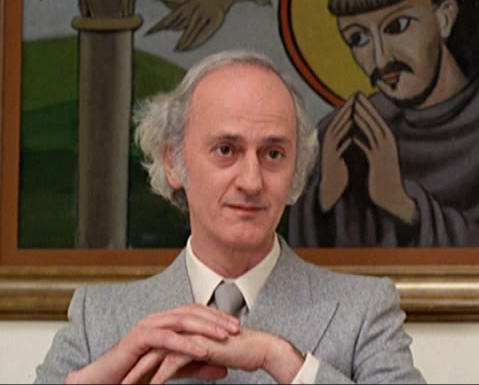
The "mega-director" of Megaditta (Paolo Paoloni) in the film Fantozzi

Fantozzi's adventures and misadventures often take place in an unnamed city of Italy (usually filmed in Rome), while in the novels Fantozzi lives in Genoa. Reality is often surreal, with events apparently happening just for Fantozzi (and, sometimes, other character)'s bad luck, or bizarre titles attributed to characters, or even some strange phenomena such as the employer's clouds, all obviously played for the laughs. Notoriously, characters in the Fantozzi universe mistakenly conjugate Italian-language verbs to conjunctive in third-person singular (which, in feminine form, is used in Italian to speak formally, a form of speech overly used by characters in the series), saying, for example, the verb "to go" (Italian: andare), as vadi rather than the correct form vada. This erroneous form of speech, already present in Italian comedy films as early as in films by Totò, has become extremely famous and is usually linked to the character of Fantozzi.

== Cultural impact ==
Fantozzi's films, albeit with irony, have anticipated the issues of mobbing in large companies, have made expressions such as "How human, you!", as well as the adjective fantozziano, recorded in all Italian dictionaries and to the expression alla Fantozzi, locutions that arose to indicate experiences, attitudes or situations permeated by the character's own tragicomic air.

Curiously, the same fate also befell his colleague Filini, in the films the organizer of company after-work trips; "Filini organization" is a common expression to indicate botched events or events full of mishaps that would normally have been widely foreseeable.

== Acknowledgments ==
In July 2021, the municipality of Rome approved the installation of a commemorative plaque on the building of the ring road where the famous scene took place in which Ugo Fantozzi catches the bus to go to work.

== Books ==
- Villaggio, Paolo (1971). Fantozzi (in Italian). Milan: Rizzoli.
- Villaggio, Paolo (1974). Il secondo tragico libro di Fantozzi (in Italian). Milan: Rizzoli.
- Villaggio, Paolo (1976). Le lettere di Fantozzi (in Italian). Milan: Rizzoli.
- Villaggio, Paolo (1979). Fantozzi contro tutti (in Italian). Milan: Rizzoli.
- Villaggio, Paolo (1983). Fantozzi subisce ancora (in Italian). Milan: Rizzoli.
- Villaggio, Paolo (1993). Caro direttore, ci scrivo... : lettere del tragico ragioniere, raccolte da Paolo Villaggio (in Italian). Milan: Mondadori.
- Villaggio, Paolo (1994). Fantozzi saluta e se ne va: le ultime lettere del rag. Ugo Fantozzi (in Italian). Milan: Mondadori.
- Villaggio, Paolo (2012). Tragica vita del ragionier Fantozzi (in Italian). Milan: Mondadori.

== Films ==
- Fantozzi, directed by Luciano Salce (1975)
- Il secondo tragico Fantozzi, directed by Luciano Salce (1976)
- Fantozzi contro tutti, directed by Neri Parenti (1980)
- Fantozzi subisce ancora, directed by Neri Parenti (1983)
- Superfantozzi, directed by Neri Parenti (1986)
- Fantozzi va in pensione, directed by Neri Parenti (1988)
- Fantozzi alla riscossa, directed by Neri Parenti (1990)
- Fantozzi in paradiso, directed by Neri Parenti (1993)
- Fantozzi - Il ritorno, directed by Neri Parenti (1996)
- Fantozzi 2000 - La clonazione, directed by Domenico Saverni (1999)

== Graphic novel ==
- Fantozzi Forever (2014)
