= Sergio Montanari =

Italian film editor

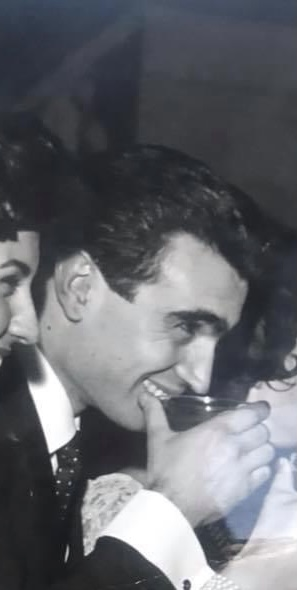
- Born: 22 October 1937; Rome, Italy
- Died: 23 March 1999 (aged 61); Rome, Italy
- Occupation: Film editor

Sergio Montanari (22 October 1937 – 23 March 1999) was an Italian film editor who was born in Rome and died ibidem. (aged 61) He began his career as assistant editor in the late 1950s in films such as Song of Naples and The Sword and the Cross and In more than thirty years of his career he has worked on the participated in over 150 productions.

== Partial filmography ==
- The Climax (1967)
- For a Few Dollars Less (1966)
- Django (1966)
- The Birds, the Bees and the Italians (1966)
- Texas, Adios (1996)
- The Crazy Kids of the War (1967)
- God Forgives... I Don't! (1967)
- The Wild Eye (1967)
- Ten Thousand Dollars for a Massacre (1967)
- Hate for Hate (1967)
- Today We Kill, Tomorrow We Die! (1968)
- Frame Up (1968)
- Seven Times Seven (1968)
- The Lady of Monza (1969)
- The Archangel (1969)
- The Invisible Woman (1969)
- Come Have Coffee with Us (1970)
