= Piero De Bernardi =

Italian screenwriter

- Born: 12 April 1926; Prato, Tuscany, Kingdom of Italy
- Died: 8 January 2010 (aged 83); Milan, Lombardy, Italy
- Occupation: Screenwriter
- Years active: 1954–2010

Piero De Bernardi (12 April 1926 – 8 January 2010) was an Italian screenwriter. He wrote for more than 100 films between 1954 and 2010. He was born in Prato, Tuscany.

== Biography ==
De Bernardi was part of a writing duo that included Leonardo Benvenuti who died in 2000.

Among many others, the writing team worked on Once Upon a Time in America which won quite a few awards and the 1964 comedy Marriage Italian Style starring Sophie Loren which won two Oscars.

Over the course of his life's work, Piero De Bernardi won no less than 11 awards. Many of the films he wrote for were entered into the Cannes Film Festival receiving critical acclaim.

De Bernardi died on 8 January 2010. His daughter is the actress Isabella De Bernardi.

== Selected filmography ==
- All My Friends Part 2 (1982)
- Bianco, rosso e Verdone (1981)
- The Flower in His Mouth (1975)
- Lo chiameremo Andrea (1975)
- Alfredo, Alfredo (1972)
- Between Miracles (1971)
- Let's Have a Riot (1970)
- Ghosts – Italian Style (1968)
- Misunderstood (1966)
- I complessi (1965)
- A Question of Honour (1965)
- Marriage Italian-Style (1964)
- Kali Yug: Goddess of Vengeance (1963)
- The Mystery of the Indian Temple (1963)
- Shivers in Summer (1963)
- Girl with a Suitcase (1961)
- The Joy of Living (1961)
- A Man of Straw (1958)
- Guendalina (1957)
- The Song of the Heart (1955)
- Orphan of the Ghetto (1954)
