= Leonardo Benvenuti =

Italian screenwriter

- Born: 8 September 1923; Florence, Tuscany, Kingdom of Italy
- Died: 3 November 2000 (aged 77); Rome, Lazio, Italy
- Occupation: Screenwriter
- Years active: 1948–2000

Leonardo Benvenuti (8 September 1923 – 3 November 2000) also called Leo, was an Italian screenwriter. He wrote for more than 130 films between 1948 and 2000. He was born in Florence, Italy and died in Rome, Italy.

== Selected filmography ==
- Once Upon a Time in America (1984)
- All My Friends Part 2 (1982)
- Bianco, rosso e Verdone (1981)
- Goodnight, Ladies and Gentlemen (1978)
- Professor Kranz tedesco di Germania (1978)
- My Friends (1975)
- The Flower in His Mouth (1975)
- Alfredo, Alfredo (1972)
- Lo chiameremo Andrea (1972)
- Between Miracles (1971)
- Let's Have a Riot (1970)
- Ghosts – Italian Style (1968)
- Misunderstood (1966)
- I complessi (1965)
- A Question of Honour (1965)
- Marriage Italian-Style (1964)
- The Mystery of the Indian Temple (1963)
- Kali Yug: Goddess of Vengeance (1963)
- Shivers in Summer (1963)
- Girl with a Suitcase (1961)
- The Joy of Living (1961)
- A Man of Straw (1958)
- Guendalina (1957)
- Fathers and Sons (1957)
- Amici per la pelle (1955)
- House of Ricordi (1954)
- Symphony of Love (1954)
- Farewell, My Beautiful Lady (1954)
- Loving You Is My Sin (1953)
- What Scoundrels Men Are! (1953)
- Beauties on Motor Scooters (1952)
- Son of the Hunchback (1952)
- The Crossroads (1951)
- Mistress of the Mountains (1950)
- Captain Demonio (1950)
