= Maria Grazia Buccella =

Italian actress (born 1940)

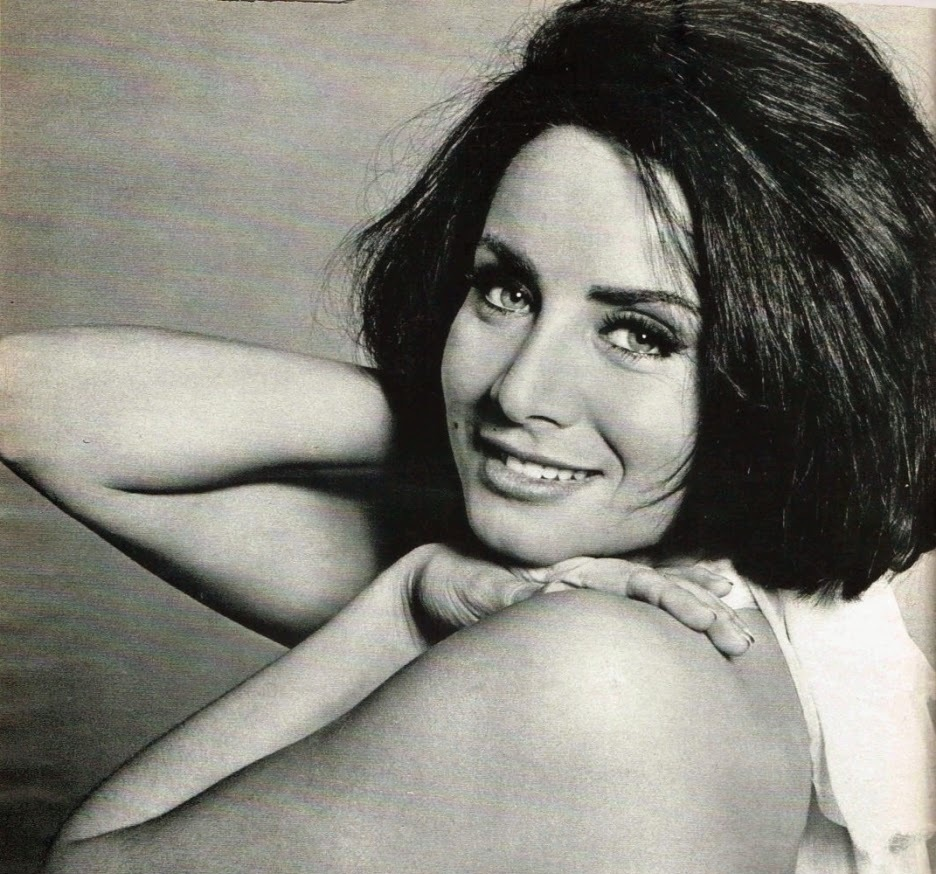
- Buccella in a publicity photograph, c. 1960
- Born: August 15, 1940 (age 86); Milan, Kingdom of Italy
- Occupations: Model; actress
- Beauty pageant titleholder
- Title: Miss Italia 1959
- Years active: 1951–2000
- Major competitions: Miss Italia 1959 (Winner); Miss Universe 1959 (Unplaced)

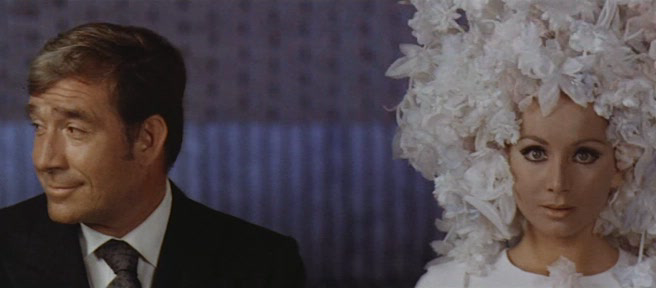
Buccella with Ugo Tognazzi in Dismissed on His Wedding Night (1969)

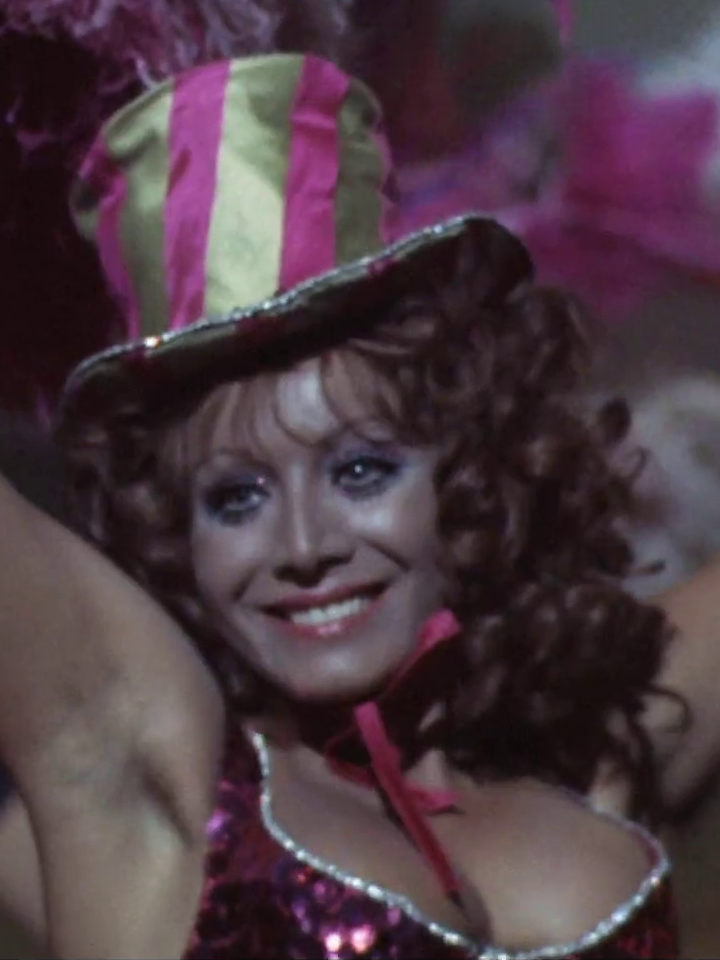
Buccella in Basta guardarla (1970)

Maria Grazia Buccella (born August 15, 1940) is an Italian actress, glamour model, and beauty-pageant titleholder, who was crowned Miss Italia 1959 and represented her country at Miss Universe 1959.

== Career ==
Buccella won the Miss Trento, Miss Venice, and Miss Italy beauty pageants, and placed third in the Miss Europe 1959 competition. She represented Italy in the 1959 Miss Universe contest held in Long Beach, California. When she failed to make the cut from the initial 81 contestants to the final 15, the voluptuous Buccella was quoted as saying, "The judges and I obviously disagree. Back home, the men would wait for most of these girls to gain some more weight. But I am not bitter. They are nice girls."

She was busy throughout the 1960s in numerous Italian and European films. She screen tested for the role of Domino Derval in the 1965 James Bond film Thunderball. (The role, originally an Italian woman named Dominetta Petacchi, went to French actress Claudine Auger.) That same year Buccella appeared in the Dino Risi-directed film Il Gaucho which starred Vittorio Gassman; Gentleman de Cocody, starring Jean Marais; The Secret Agents, starring Gassman and Henry Fonda; and the Dino DeLaurentiis production Menage All'Italiana.

Buccella appeared in the comedy anthology Love and Marriage (U.S. release 1966) in a story that presaged the film Indecent Proposal. New York Times film critic Howard Thompson wrote, "Lando Buzzanca as the proud and fiery husband and Maria Grazia Buccella as his dovelike bride are marvelous." Vittorio De Sica cast her as a sexy, bikini-clad thief in the Peter Sellers farce film After the Fox, in which she flirted with Sellers while lip-synching dialog by Akim Tamiroff. In 1968, she won a Silver Ribbon award at the Italian National Syndicate of Film Journalists for Best Supporting Actress (Migliore Attrice Non Protagonista) in the film Ti ho sposato per allegria (released as I Married You for Fun).

Buccella was featured on the cover of the July 1977 Italian edition of Playboy magazine. She retired from films in 1979, although she made two small appearances in the late 1980s and a final appearance in the 2000 television series Hotel Otello.

== Filmography ==
- La nostra pelle, directed by Raymond Berhard (1951)
- Rasputin (1954)
- The Night They Killed Rasputin (1960)
- Fountain of Trevi, directed by Carlo Campogalliani (1960)
- La strada dei giganti, directed by Guido Malatesta (1960)
- Nerone '71, directed by Walter Filippi (1961)
- The Fall of Rome, directed by Antonio Margheriti (1963)
- Il Boom, directed by Vittorio De Sica (1963)
- Siamo tutti pomicioni, directed by Marino Girolami (1963)
- La donna degli altri è sempre più bella, directed by Marino Girolami (1963)
- Canzoni in bikini, directed by Giuseppe Vari (1963)
- Love and Marriage, directed by Gianni Puccini (1964)
- Il Gaucho, directed by Dino Risi (1965)
- The Man from Cocody, directed by Christian-Jaque (1965)
- Su e giù, directed by Mino Guerrini (1965)
- The Dirty Game, directed by Carlo Lizzani (1965)
- Menage all'italiana, directed by Franco Indovina (1965)
- Adultery Italian Style, directed by Pasquale Festa Campanile (1966)
- A Maiden for a Prince, directed by Pasquale Festa Campanile (1966)
- For Love and Gold, directed by Mario Monicelli (1966)
- After the Fox, directed by Vittorio De Sica (1966)
- Pleasant Nights, directed by Armando Crispino (1966)
- Dead Run, directed by Christian-Jaque (1967)
- I Married You for Fun, directed by Luciano Salce (1967)
- Domani non siamo pià qui, directed by Brunello Rondi (1967)
- It's Your Move, directed by Robert Fiz (1968)
- Villa Rides, directed by Buzz Kulik (1968)
- Giacomo Casanova: Childhood and Adolescence, directed by Luigi Comencini (1969)
- Where Are You Going All Naked?, directed by Pasquale Festa Campanile (1969)
- Dismissed on His Wedding Night, directed by Ugo Tognazzi (1969)
- The Wind's Fierce, directed by Mario Camus (1970)
- I Clowns, directed by Federico Fellini (1970)
- Il provinciale, directed by Luciano Salce (1971)
- Basta guardarla, directed by Luciano Salce (1971)
- Remo e Romolo - Storia di due figli di una lupa, directed by Pier Francesco Pingitore (1976)
- Nerone, directed by Pier Francesco Pingitore (1977)
- Quando c'era lui... caro lei!, directed by Giancarlo Santi (1978)
- L'importante è non farsi notare, directed by Romolo Guerrieri (1979)
- Crime in Formula One, directed by Bruno Corbucci (1983)
- I ragazzi della 3ª C (TV series, 1988, guest star)
