= Furto di sera bel colpo si spera =

- Directed by: Mariano Laurenti
- Written by: Mariano Laurenti; Pippo Franco
- Produced by: I.I.F.
- Starring: Pippo Franco; Giancarlo Prete
- Cinematography: Tino Santoni
- Music by: Pippo Franco
- Release date: 1973
- Language: Italian

Furto di sera bel colpo si spera (i.e. "Theft in the evening, a big coup hopefully") is a 1973 Italian heist-comedy film written and directed by Mariano Laurenti and starring Pippo Franco.

== Cast ==
- Pippo Franco as Quinto
- Giancarlo Prete as Armando Ciccarelli
- Laura Troschel as Lidia (credited as Costanza Spada)
- Thomas Rudy as Euforia
- Piero Vida as Marcello
- Monica Monet as Nicoletta
- Aldo Giuffrè as Count Nuvolucci
- Memmo Carotenuto as Quinto's father
- Umberto D'Orsi as Commendatore
- Andrea Aureli as Receiver of stolen goods
- Ignazio Leone

== See also ==
- List of Italian films of 1973
