= Pippo Franco =

Italian actor, comedian, television presenter, and singer (born 1940)

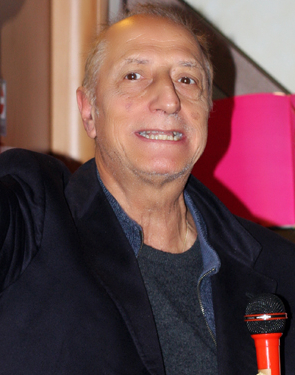
- Franco, 2013
- Born: Francesco Pippo; 2 September 1940 (age 86); Rome, Italy
- Occupations: Comic actor; singer; TV presenter

Francesco Pippo (born 2 September 1940), known professionally as Pippo Franco, is an Italian actor, comedian, television presenter, and singer. He made his name first as a musician in the early 1960s, and in the late 1960s, began a career in film, starring in a great number of commedia sexy all'italiana, the "sexy comedy" subgenre of Italian comedy. In the 1970s he expanded into television, acting in TV movies and presenting variety shows. His type of comedy borrows heavily from cabaret. Throughout his career he continued to sing, appearing many times at the Sanremo Music Festival. He has made children's music as well, and has co-written three books on (linguistic) humor.

== Biography ==
=== Early life ===
Franco was born on 2 September 1940, in Rome to an Irpinian family, who had moved to Rome from Vallata, in the Province of Avellino.

=== Cinema ===
Franco's first role in a box office hit was 1969's Nell'anno del Signore, directed by Luigi Magni and starring "an exceptional cast of actors" including Franco, Nino Manfredi and Claudia Cardinale.

In the 1970s and 1980s, he starred in a large number of Italian comedies, many of them erotic comedies such as the 1972 Mariano Laurenti production Quel gran pezzo dell'Ubalda tutta nuda e tutta calda, a semi-medieval erotic spoof (a "decamerotic" film) distributed in the US as Ubalda, all naked and warm, in which Franco starred (with "undeniable comic verve") alongside Edwige Fenech, the Algerian-born last "popular incarnation of the 'sex bombs' so in vogue twenty years earlier." The success of Ubalda was followed by another successful movie with Franco and Edwige, Sergio Martino's Giovannona Coscialunga disonorata con onore (1973). Franco again worked with Martino and Fenech in 1980 in Zucchero, miele e peperoncino and in 1982 in Ricchi, ricchissimi... praticamente in mutande, though Franco and Fenech did not share any scenes in these anthologies. In 1972, he had a part in Billy Wilder's Italian/American comedy Avanti! alongside Jack Lemmon and Juliet Mills. He directed his first movie in 1981, La gatta da pelare, for which he also wrote the score and the script.

In 2018, he was in the cast of singer-songwriter Marco Santilli's music video entitled Portami via da me, together with showgirl Mercédesz Henger.

=== Television ===
Franco began a career in television in 1971 with Riuscirà il cav. papà Ubu?, directed by Vito Molinari and Beppe Recchia, and from then on played in a number of TV movies.

Franco has appeared on numerous Italian TV shows as comic and as presenter. In 1980, he presented the weekly television show of the drawing of the Italian lottery, with Laura Troschel (then his wife) and Claudio Cecchetto. In the 1990s, he appeared on the comedy show La sai l'ultima? with English TV presenter Harold Davies, and in the 2000s he presented the variety show Bellissima: Cabaret Anticrisi, in cooperation with the variety company Il Bagaglino.

=== Music ===
Franco began singing and playing guitar at the end of the 1950s and started writing songs with surreal lyrics. One of his groups, The Penguins, made its debut in 1960 in the musicarello by Mario Mattoli for Appuntamento a Ischia, and accompanied Mina Mazzini on three songs, "La nonna Magdalena," "Il cielo in una stanza", and "Una zebra a pois."

In 1968, he scored a minor hit with the single "Vedendo una foto di Bob Dylan," which made fun of the gap between beatniks and their parents.

As a singer, he recorded more than a dozen albums, including Cara Kiri (1971), Bededè (1975), Al cabaret (1977), Praticamente, no? (1978), Pippo nasone and Vietato ai minori (1981). One of his most famous songs is Cesso.

His songs were recorded on more than fifteen 45 rpm vinyl records, including several hits like La licantropia (1969), which participated in Cantagiro 1969.

Beginning in the late 1970s, Franco began playing and composing children's music, as well as music for the shows by the Italian lottery.

Between 1979 and 1984, he was an annual performer and presenter at the popular music festival in San Remo. He most notably performed Sanremo 1982's theme "Che fico!" and the children's hit song "Chì chì chì cò cò cò" at Sanremo 1983. He returned there in 2008.

=== Politics ===
In the 2006 Italian general election, he was a candidate for the Italian Senate from the list of Christian Democracy for Autonomies in Lazio. Despite the publicly stated support of Giulio Andreotti, Pippo Franco's party got only 0.6% of votes in Lazio and therefore it was not elected.

== Private life ==
Pippo Franco has been married twice and has three children. He considers himself Roman Catholic.

== Filmography ==
=== Movies ===
- 1968 – Chimera, directed by Ettore Maria Fizzarotti
- 1969 – Nell'anno del Signore, directed by Luigi Magni
- 1969 – Hate Is My God, directed by Claudio Gora
- 1969 – Zingara, directed by Mariano Laurenti
- 1969 – Il giovane normale, directed by Dino Risi
- 1969 – Pensiero d'amore, directed by Mario Amendola
- 1970 – Basta guardarla, directed by Luciano Salce
- 1970 – W le donne, directed by Aldo Grimaldi
- 1970 – Il debito coniugale, directed by Franco Prosperi
- 1971 – Mazzabubù... Quante corna stanno quaggiù?, directed by Mariano Laurenti
- 1972 – Boccaccio, directed by Bruno Corbucci
- 1972 – Ubalda, All Naked and Warm, directed by Mariano Laurenti
- 1972 – Avanti!, directed by Billy Wilder
- 1973 – Rugantino, directed by Pasquale Festa Campanile
- 1973 – Furto di sera bel colpo si spera, directed by Mariano Laurenti
- 1973 – Patroclooo! E il soldato Camillone, grande grosso e frescone, directed by Mariano Laurenti
- 1973 – Giovannona Long-Thigh, directed by Sergio Martino
- 1974 – La via dei babbuini, directed by Luigi Magni
- 1974 – La sbandata, directed by Alfredo Malfatti and Salvatore Samperi
- 1976 – Hanno ucciso un altro bandito, directed by Guglielmo Garroni
- 1976 – Remo e Romolo – Storia di due figli di una lupa, directed by Mario Castellacci and Pier Francesco Pingitore
- 1977 – Nerone, directed by Mario Castellacci and Pier Francesco Pingitore
- 1978 – L'inquilina del piano di sopra, directed by Ferdinando Baldi
- 1978 – Scherzi da prete, directed by Pier Francesco Pingitore
- 1979 – Tutti a squola, directed by Pier Francesco Pingitore
- 1979 – L'imbranato, directed by Pier Francesco Pingitore
- 1980 – Arrivano i bersaglieri, directed by Luigi Magni
- 1980 – Il casinista, directed by Pier Francesco Pingitore
- 1980 – Ciao marziano, directed by Pier Francesco Pingitore
- 1980 – Il ficcanaso (also known as La profesora se desnuda), directed by Bruno Corbucci
- 1980 – Sugar, Honey and Pepper, directed by Sergio Martino
- 1981 – La gatta da pelare, directed and scored by Pippo Franco
- 1982 – Don't Play with Tigers, directed by Sergio Martino
- 1982 – Attenti a quei P2, directed by Pier Francesco Pingitore
- 1983 – Sfrattato cerca casa equo canone, directed by Pier Francesco Pingitore
- 1983 – Due strani papà, directed by Mariano Laurenti
- 1983 – Il tifoso, l'arbitro e il calciatore, directed by Pier Francesco Pingitore
- 1992 – Gole ruggenti, directed by Pier Francesco Pingitore
- 2010 – Il Numero 2, directed by Vito Cea
- 2016 – Tiramisù, directed by Fabio De Luigi
- Help! My In-Laws Are Vampires! (2021)

=== Television ===
- 1971 – Riuscirà il cav. papà Ubu?, directed by Vito Molinari and Beppe Recchia
- 1973 – Dove sta Zazà, directed by Antonello Falqui
- 1975 – Mazzabubù, directed by Antonello Falqui
- 1978 – Il Ribaltone, directed by Antonello Falqui
- 1979 – C'era una volta Roma, directed by Pier Francesco Pingitore
- 1979 – I racconti di fantascienza di Blasetti, episode "L'assassino," directed by Alessandro Blasetti
- 1990 – Senator, directed by Gianfrancesco Lazotti
- 1997 – Ladri si nasce, directed by Pier Francesco Pingitore
- 1998 – Ladri si diventa, directed by Pier Francesco Pingitore
- 1999 – Tre stelle, directed by Pier Francesco Pingitore
- 2000 – La casa delle beffe, directed by Pier Francesco Pingitore
- 2007 – Di che peccato sei?, directed by Pier Francesco Pingitore

== Discography ==
=== Singles ===
- 1967 – "Vedendo una foto di Bob Dylan"/"Mister Custer," ARC, AN 4111 (7")
- 1969 – "Qualsiasi cosa faccia"/"La licantropia," Dischi Ricordi, SRL 10557 (7")
- 1976 – "Praticamente no"/"I scherzi stupidi," Cinevox, SC 1086 (7")
- 1977 – "Isotta"/"Ninna Nanna Nonna," Cinevox, SC 1103 (7")
- 1977 – "Quanto sei bella Roma"/"L'autostop," Cinevox, SC 1099 (7" – single by Laura Troschel featuring Pippo Franco)
- 1977 – "Il Bello e la Bestia," Cinevox (7" – single by Laura Troschel featuring Pippo Franco)
- 1978 – "Di questo bel terzetto"/"Pippo Nonna," Cinevox, SC 1116 (7")
- 1979 – "Mi scappa la pipì, papà"/"Dai compra," Cinevox, SC 1124 (7")
- 1979 – "Ammazza quant è bra"/"Andiamocene a Casa," Lupus, LUN 4902 (7" – single from C'era una volta Roma)
- 1979 – "Tu per me sei come Roma" (with Laura Troschel), Cinevox, SC 1135
- 1980 – "Dai lupone dai"/"La gente mi vuole male," Cinevox, SC 1141
- 1980 – "La puntura"/"Sono Pippo col naso," Lupus, LUN 4906 (7")
- 1980 – "Prendi la fortuna per la coda"/"Aria di festa," Lupus, LUN 4912
- 1980 – "Mandami una cartolina"/"Lezione di inglese," Lupus, LUN 4914
- 1982 – "Che fico!"/"Ma guarda un po," Lupus, LUN 4926
- 1983 – "Chì chì chì cò cò cò"/"Caaasa," Lupus, LUN 4943 (7")
- 1984 – "Pinocchio chiò"/"La pantofola," Dischi Ricordi, SRL 11000 (7")
- 1986 – "Pepè"/"Pollice," Cinevox, SC 1194
- 1988 – "Il ballo marocchino"/"Strum," Five Record, FM 13206 (7")
- 1988 – "Due risate"/"Biberon," LGO Music, N-012190

=== LP ===
- 1968 – I Personaggi Di Pippo Franco
- 1971 – Cara Kiri, Dischi Ricordi, SMRL 6085; Cinevox, ORL 8053
- 1975 – Bededè, Cinevox, SC33/22
- 1977 – Al cabaret, Cinevox, SC33/32 (theatrical show with Bombolo and Sergio Leonardi)
- 1978 – Praticamente no, Cinevox, ORL8301
- 1979 – Busti al Pincio, Cinevox, CAB2001 (theatrical show)
- 1979 – C'era una volta Roma, Cinevox, CAB2005 (theatrical show with Laura Troschel)
- 1981 – Vietato ai minori, Lupus, LULP 14905
- 1984 – Pippomix, Dischi Ricordi, TSMRL6319 (collection)
- Super Pippo Franco Bambini, WEA, EAN 0008696 (collection of singles and b-sides)

Reference: Franco discography

== Books ==
- 1981 – Il matto in casa, Editoriale Due I.
- 2001 – Pensieri per vivere. Itinerario di evoluzione interiore, Edizioni Mediterranee. ISBN 88-272-1418-6
- 2003 – Non prenda niente tre volte al giorno. Il lato comico dell'esperienza umana (with Antonio Di Stefano), Mondadori. ISBN 88-04-51275-X
- 2006 – Qui chiavi subito. Insegne, annunci, cognomi e strafalcioni tutti da ridere (with Antonio Di Stefano), Mondadori. ISBN 88-04-53597-0
- 2007 – L'occasione fa l'uomo ragno. Strafalcioni, cartelli, scritte sui muri e altri capolavori di umorismo involontario (with Antonio Di Stefano), Mondadori. ISBN 88-04-56832-1

== See also ==
- Italian cinema

== Bibliography ==
- Andrea Jelardi, Queer tv, omosessualità e trasgressione nella televisione italiana. Rome: Croce.
- Andrea Jelardi and Giuseppe Farruggio, In scena en travesti, Il travestitismo nello spettacolo italiano. Rome: Croce, 2009.
