= L'imbranato =

- Directed by: Pier Francesco Pingitore
- Written by: Mario Castellacci; Pier Francesco Pingitore
- Produced by: Fulvio Lucisano
- Starring: Pippo Franco; Laura Troschel
- Cinematography: Carlo Carlini
- Edited by: Antonio Siciliano
- Music by: Alessandro Alessandroni
- Release date: 1979
- Language: Italian

L'imbranato (The bumbling man) is a 1979 Italian comedy film written and directed by Pier Francesco Pingitore.

== Plot ==
Pippo Sperandio is an employee of an Italian electronics company in direct contact with his boss, the pleasure-seeker Dr. Maramotti, who never misses an opportunity to have relationships with different types of women including Laura, his secretary. However, when he needs to be replaced during a holiday in Sardinia he calls and sends Pippo Sperandio to his place who - as Doctor Maramotti - will have to deal with a hectic holiday full of sport and goliardic parties, typical of the tourist villages of those years, which he is not used to.

== Cast ==
- Pippo Franco: Pippo Sperandio
- Laura Troschel: Laura
- Bombolo: Bombolo Cicerchia
- Luciana Turina: Poldina Sperandio
- Duilio Del Prete: Dr. Felice Maramotti
- Oreste Lionello: "Man-i-drake"
- Enzo Cannavale: The man who laughs
- Teo Teocoli: Teo
- Sergio Leonardi: Bandit
- Giancarlo Magalli: Capo animatore
- Franca Scagnetti: Doorwoman

== See also ==
- List of Italian films of 1979
