= Nerone (1977 film) =

- Directed by: Castellacci & Pingitore
- Written by: Castellacci & Pingitore
- Produced by: Mario Cecchi Gori
- Starring: Pippo Franco
- Cinematography: Sergio Martinelli
- Music by: Flavio Bocci
- Release date: 1977
- Language: Italian

Nerone is a 1977 Italian comedy film directed by Castellacci & Pingitore. It parodies real life event of the Roman emperor Nero.

== Cast ==
- Pippo Franco as Nero
- Maria Grazia Buccella as Poppea
- Paola Tedesco as Licia
- Oreste Lionello as Seneca
- Enrico Montesano as Petronio Arbitro
- Paola Borboni as Agrippina
- Gianfranco D'Angelo as Tigellino
- Paolo Stoppa as San Pietro
- Aldo Fabrizi as General Galba
- Bombolo as Roscio
- Marina Marfoglia as Atte
- Laura Troschel as Locusta
- Massimo Dapporto as liberated Christian
- Attilio Dottesio as Centurione
- Giancarlo Magalli as Senate President
- Carmen Russo as Lucilla
- Giò Stajano as Sporio (credited as Gio Staiano)
