= Sanremo Music Festival 1970 =

Italian song contest (20th edition)

Dates and venue
- First night: 26 February 1970
- Second night: 27 February 1970
- Final night: 28 February 1970
- Venue: Sanremo Casino; Sanremo, Italy

Organisation
- Organiser: Due Erre

Production
- Broadcaster: Radiotelevisione italiana (RAI)
- Director: Enrico Moscatelli
- Presenters: Nuccio Costa; Enrico Maria Salerno; Princess Ira von Fürstenberg

Vote
- Number of entries: 26
- Winner: "Chi non lavora non fa l'amore" Adriano Celentano and Claudia Mori

The Sanremo Music Festival 1970 (Italian: Festival di Sanremo 1970), officially the 20th Italian Song Festival (20º Festival della canzone italiana), was the 20th annual Sanremo Music Festival, held at the Sanremo Casino in Sanremo between 26 and 28 February 1970. It was organised by the company Due Erre and broadcast by Radiotelevisione italiana (RAI). The shows were presented by Nuccio Costa, Enrico Maria Salerno and Princess Ira von Fürstenberg.

Each song was performed twice by both Italian and foreign artists. The winning song was "Chi non lavora non fa l'amore" written by Luciano Beretta, Miki Del Prete and Adriano Celentano, and performed by both Celentano and Claudia Mori.

== Format ==
In 1969, the municipality of Sanremo assumed management of the festival's venue, the Sanremo Casino, taking over from Società ATA who had organised the festival since 1958, after their concession ended and the planned public auction for the casino's management was suspended. Despite initial plans to organise the event themselves, the municipality eventually accepted an offer from Gianni Ravera, who served as the festival's artistic director from 1962 to 1968, and Ezio Radaelli, the former president of ATA, to organise the event through their newly established company Due Erre. The two agreed to pay the municipality fifty million lire and cover all expenses associated with organising the event.

In a meeting that took place on 26 April between the municipality and Radiotelevisione italiana (RAI), a decision was made to move the dates of the event to the end of February to avoid potential interference with RAI's musical variety show Canzonissima.

In addition to the three live shows on 26, 27 and 28 February 1970, a string of events took place at the Teatro Ariston in the contest's lead-up. On 22 February a show celebrating the festival's twentieth anniversary took place, was hosted by Daniele Piombi and featured performances of winning songs from previous editions. Shows on the following two days featured the artists Johnny Hallyday, The New Christy Minstrels, Roberto Carlos, Joe Dassin and Joe Cocker, and on 25 February, the Italian premiere of the film Easy Rider took place.

=== Voting system ===
The vote in each show was conducted by twenty-four juries formed by newspapers across Italy, each with twenty-five members located in their respective newspaper offices. In the first two nights, jury members gave one vote to seven different songs, while in the final they gave one vote to three songs.

== Competing entries ==
303 songs were submitted for the competition. The festival's organisers, Gianni Ravera and Ezio Radaelli, formed a special commission composed of ten members including themselves, Renato Griffan, Rodolfo D'Intino, Marcello De Martino, Enrico Gramigna and Luciano Pedrocchi. The other three members were women, included in the selection process to represent the music taste of the general public. The commission was tasked with narrowing down the list of submissions to twenty-four. Eventually, twenty-six were selected to compete.

A restriction was imposed on the number of foreign artists allowed to compete in the competition this year, as requested by the Unione cantanti italiana (UCI), which limited the amount to only four, of which two were required to reside in Italy.

The Castrocaro Music Festival was used to select two newcomer artists automatically given a spot among the festival's list of competing artists, after a one year break from being tied to the competition. The winners of the 1969 edition were Lucia Rizzi and Dino Drusiani.

Competing entries
Song	Artist 1	Artist 2	Songwriter(s)	Conductor(s)
"Accidenti"	Il Supergruppo	Rocky Roberts	Ricky Gianco; Dante Pieretti	Natale Massara; Vince Tempera
"Ahi ahi ragazzo"	Valeria Mongardini	Rita Pavone	Umberto Napolitano; Franco Migliacci	Mario Capuano; Piero Pintucci
"Ahi! Che male che mi fai"	I Ragazzi della Via Gluck	Paolo Mengoli	Salvatore Cutugno; Cristiano Minellono	Roberto Negri; Nando De Luca
"Canzone blu"	Tony Renis	Sergio Leonardi	Tony Renis; Mogol; Alberto Testa	Detto Mariano; Renato Angiolini
"Che effetto mi fa"	Pino Donaggio	Sandie Shaw	Pino Donaggio; Cristiano Minellono	Tony De Vita; Paolo Ormi
"Chi non lavora non fa l'amore"	Adriano Celentano	Claudia Mori	Adriano Celentano; Luciano Beretta; Miki Del Prete	Roberto Negri
"Ciao anni verdi"	Domodossola	Rosanna Fratello	Nando De Luca; Alessandro Celentano; Vito Pallavicini	Augusto Martelli; Nando De Luca
"Eternità"	Ornella Vanoni	I Camaleonti	Giancarlo Bigazzi; Claudio Cavallaro	Ninni Carucci; Detto Mariano
"Hippy"	Fausto Leali	Carmen Villani	Fausto Leali; Luciano Beretta	Gianfranco Intra; Giancarlo Chiaramello
"Io mi fermo qui"	Donatello	Dik Dik	Enrico Riccardi; Luigi Albertelli	Natale Massara
"L'addio"	Michele	Lucia Rizzi	Andrea Lo Vecchio; Plinio Maggi; Sergio Bardotti	Luis Bacalov; Giancarlo Chiaramello
"L'amore è una colomba"	Marisa Sannia	Gianni Nazzaro	Giancarlo Bigazzi; Totò Savio	Gianfranco Monaldi; Alberto Baldan Bembo
"L'arca di Noè"	Sergio Endrigo	Iva Zanicchi	Sergio Endrigo	Luis Bacalov; Ezio Leoni
"La prima cosa bella"	Nicola Di Bari	Ricchi e Poveri	Nicola Di Bari; Mogol	Gian Franco Reverberi; Mario Capuano
"La spada nel cuore"	Little Tony	Patty Pravo	Carlo Donida; Mogol	Willy Brezza; Ruggero Cini
"La stagione di un fiore"	Gens	Emiliana	Salvatore Ruisi; Luciano Rossi	Gianni Marchetti; Renato Serio
"Nevicava a Roma"	Renato Rascel	Pio	Roberto Negri; Giuseppe Verdecchia; Luciano Beretta; Miki Del Prete	Vito Tommaso; Roberto Negri
"Occhi a mandorla"	Rossano	Dori Ghezzi	Piero Soffici; Vito Pallavicini	Gianfranco Intra; Franco Cassano
"Ora vivo"	Francesco Banti	Dino Drusiani	Aldo Pagani; Angelo Favata	Claudio Fabi; Marcello Minerbi
"Pa' diglielo a ma'"	Nada	Rosalino	Jimmy Fontana; Franco Migliacci; Roberto Gigli	Piero Pintucci; Mario Capuano
"Re di cuori"	Caterina Caselli	Nino Ferrer	Claudio Cavallaro; Totò Savio; Giancarlo Bigazzi	Gianfranco Monaldi; Pierre Dutour
"Romantico blues"	Gigliola Cinquetti	Bobby Solo	Daniele Pace; Mario Panzeri; Lorenzo Pilat	Gianfranco Monaldi; Detto Mariano
"Serenata"	Tony Del Monaco	Claudio Villa	Giancarlo Bigazzi; Totò Savio; Enrico Polito	Natale Massara; Giancarlo Chiaramello
"Sole, pioggia e vento"	Luciano Tajoli	Mal	Elio Isola; Mogol	Maurizio De Angelis; Piero Pintucci
"Taxi"	Anna Identici	Antoine	Gianni Argenio; Mario Panzeri; Flavia Arrigoni; Corrado Conti	Nando De Luca; Natale Massara
"Tipitipitì"	Orietta Berti	Mario Tessuto	Mario Panzeri; Lorenzo Pilat; Daniele Pace	Alberto Baldan Bembo; Gianfranco Monaldi

== Shows ==
The festival consisted of three shows held between 26 and 28 February 1970. The first two nights consisted of thirteen songs performed twice, in which seven qualified from each show, creating a final of fourteen songs performed twice. Performances could be accompanied by the orchestra in the venue and with backing vocals provided by the vocal group I 4 + 4 di Nora Orlandi. All shows were presented by Nuccio Costa with the actors Enrico Maria Salerno and Princess Ira von Fürstenberg. The television production was directed by Enrico Moscatelli.

The song "Concerto per voce, piano e sogni" composed by Mario Capuano served as the festival's theme.

In the first two nights, the songs were presented in groups of three. A draw took place on 24 February to decide the shows' running order, including the order artists would perform in. The final was split into two halves, with the first half broadcast internationally and the second half broadcast only in Italy, both featuring every song performed once. The American group The New Christy Minstrels performed a recap of the competing songs in the final. The group was initially slated to perform recaps for all three shows, but they refused to attend the first two nights after learning their performances wouldn't be broadcast on television.

=== First night ===
The first night took place on 26 February 1970 at 21:15 CET. Thirteen songs performed and seven were selected for the final. The actor Nino Manfredi made a guest appearance performing the song "Tanto pe' cantà" at the end of the show.

During the show, Adriano Celentano stopped his performance of "Chi non lavora non fa l'amore" a minute in after making a mistake with the song's lyrics. In his second attempt, he made another mistake and stopped singing temporarily, but signaled to the conductor to keep the song going and finished the performance without any further errors.

Qualifier

First night – 26 February 1970
R/O	Song	Artist 1	Artist 2	Points	Place
1	"Occhi a mandorla"	Rossano	Dori Ghezzi	—N/a	
2	"Serenata"	Tony Del Monaco	Claudio Villa	—N/a	
3	"L'addio"	Michele	Lucia Rizzi	—N/a	
4	"La stagione di un fiore"	Gens	Emiliana	—N/a	
5	"La spada nel cuore"	Patty Pravo	Little Tony	472	1
6	"Nevicava a Roma"	Renato Rascel	Pio	—N/a	
7	"Tipitipitì"	Mario Tessuto	Orietta Berti	333	7
8	"Eternità"	I Camaleonti	Ornella Vanoni	433	3
9	"Taxi"	Antoine	Anna Identici	352	4
10	"Chi non lavora non fa l'amore"	Adriano Celentano	Claudia Mori	466	2
11	"Canzone blu"	Sergio Leonardi	Tony Renis	342	6
12	"Romantico blues"	Gigliola Cinquetti	Bobby Solo	343	5
13	"Che effetto mi fa"	Pino Donaggio	Sandie Shaw	—N/a	

=== Second night ===
The second night took place on 27 February 1970 at 21:15 CET. Thirteen songs performed and seven were selected for the final.

A small incident occurred when Rita Pavone knocked over her microphone during her performance of "Ahi ahi ragazzo".

Qualifier

Second night – 27 February 1970
R/O	Song	Artist 1	Artist 2	Points	Place
1	"L'amore è una colomba"	Marisa Sannia	Gianni Nazzaro	372	3
2	"Ahi ahi ragazzo"	Valeria Mongardini	Rita Pavone	—N/a	
3	"Io mi fermo qui"	Donatello	Dik Dik	—N/a	
4	"Ahi! Che male che mi fai"	I Ragazzi della Via Gluck	Paolo Mengoli	—N/a	
5	"La prima cosa bella"	Nicola Di Bari	Ricchi e Poveri	458	2
6	"Ciao anni verdi"	Domodossola	Rosanna Fratello	—N/a	
7	"Sole, pioggia e vento"	Luciano Tajoli	Mal	318	6
8	"Pa' diglielo a ma'"	Rosalino	Nada	362	5
9	"Accidenti"	Il Supergruppo	Rocky Roberts	—N/a	
10	"Hippy"	Fausto Leali	Carmen Villani	312	7
11	"Re di cuori"	Caterina Caselli	Nino Ferrer	369	4
12	"Ora vivo"	Francesco Banti	Dino Drusiani	—N/a	
13	"L'arca di Noè"	Sergio Endrigo	Iva Zanicchi	480	1

=== Final night ===
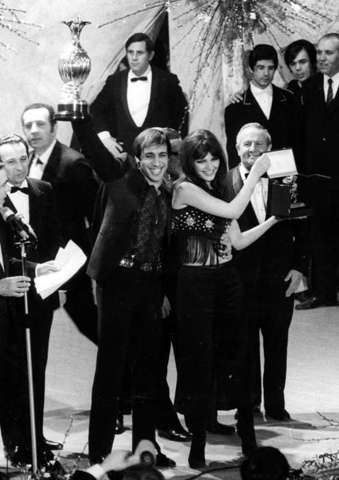
Adriano Celentano and Claudia Mori holding the first prize

The final night took place on 28 February 1970 at 21:00 CET. The fourteen songs admitted to the final were performed again and a winner was chosen. Guest appearances included the Brazilian actress Florinda Bolkan and the American group The New Christy Minstrels, who performed a recap of the competing songs in the final.

The winning song was "Chi non lavora non fa l'amore" written by Luciano Beretta, Miki Del Prete and Adriano Celentano, who performed the song in addition to his wife Claudia Mori. In second place was the song "La prima cosa bella" written by Mogol and Nicola Di Bari, performed by Di Bari and the group Ricchi e Poveri, with "L'arca di Noè" written and performed by Sergio Endrigo, and also performed by Iva Zanicchi placing third. All six performances of the top three songs were repeated at the end of the show.

"L'arca di Noè" also received a prize for the best lyrics among the competing songs, as decided by a commission appointed by the municipality of Sanremo. Patty Pravo received an award dedicated to the journalist Giorgio Berti, which was given to the best performer at the festival decided by journalists at the event.

Winner

Final night – 28 February 1970
R/O	Song	Artist 1	Artist 2	Points	Place
1	"L'amore è una colomba"	Marisa Sannia	Gianni Nazzaro	44	11
2	"L'arca di Noè"	Sergio Endrigo	Iva Zanicchi	296	3
3	"Canzone blu"	Tony Renis	Sergio Leonardi	28	13
4	"Sole, pioggia e vento"	Luciano Tajoli	Mal	52	9
5	"La spada nel cuore"	Little Tony	Patty Pravo	133	5
6	"Re di cuori"	Caterina Caselli	Nino Ferrer	24	14
7	"Eternità"	Ornella Vanoni	I Camaleonti	233	4
8	"Tipitipitì"	Orietta Berti	Mario Tessuto	52	9
9	"La prima cosa bella"	Nicola Di Bari	Ricchi e Poveri	309	2
10	"Taxi"	Anna Identici	Antoine	61	8
11	"Hippy"	Fausto Leali	Carmen Villani	37	12
12	"Romantico blues"	Gigliola Cinquetti	Bobby Solo	96	6
13	"Pa' diglielo a ma'"	Nada	Rosalino	70	7
14	"Chi non lavora non fa l'amore"	Adriano Celentano	Claudia Mori	344	1

== Broadcasts ==
=== Local broadcast ===
The final was broadcast on Programma Nazionale (television) and Secondo Programma (radio) beginning at 21:00 CET. The first two nights were broadcast on Secondo Programma (television) and Secondo Programma (radio) at 21:15 CET. The final was broadcast on television in Italy to an estimated 25 million viewers.

=== International broadcast ===
The first half of the final was broadcast via the Eurovision network in other countries. Known details on the broadcasts in each country, including the specific broadcasting stations and commentators are shown in the tables below.

International broadcasters of the Sanremo Music Festival 1970
Country	Broadcaster	Channel(s)	Commentator(s)	Ref(s)
Argentina	Radio Rivadavia		Cacho Fontana	
Australia	Nine Network	GTV-9 (Note: Delayed broadcast on 1 March at 17:00 and 22:25 (AEST))		
Brazil	Rede Tupi (Note: Deferred broadcast at 21:00 (BRT))	TV Tupi Rio de Janeiro		
Brazil	Rede Tupi	TV Tupi São Paulo		
Brazil	Rede Tupi	TV Brasília		
Brazil	Rede Tupi	TV Paraná		
Brazil	Rede Tupi	TV Piratini		
Chile	UCTV	Canal 13 (Note: Delayed broadcast on 18 and 25 October at 19:25 (CLST))		
Czechoslovakia	ČsR	Radio Praha (Note: Delayed broadcast in a shortened format on 13 August at 17:40 (CEST))		
Iceland	RÚV	Sjónvarpið (Note: Delayed broadcast on 10 May at 20:50 (WET))		
Portugal	RTP	RTP		
Romania	TVR	Programul 1 (Note: Delayed broadcast in a shortened format on 14 March 1970 at 22:20 (EET))		
Spain	TVE	TVE 1	José Luis Uribarri	
Spain	Cadena SER (Note: Simulcast on Radio Castellón, Radio Girona, Radio Las Palmas, Radio San Sebastián, Radio Valladolid, and Radio Zaragoza.)			
Yugoslavia	JRT	Televizija Beograd		
Yugoslavia	JRT	Televizija Ljubljana		
Yugoslavia	JRT	Televizija Zagreb		
