= SS Lazio supporters =

Italian supporters group

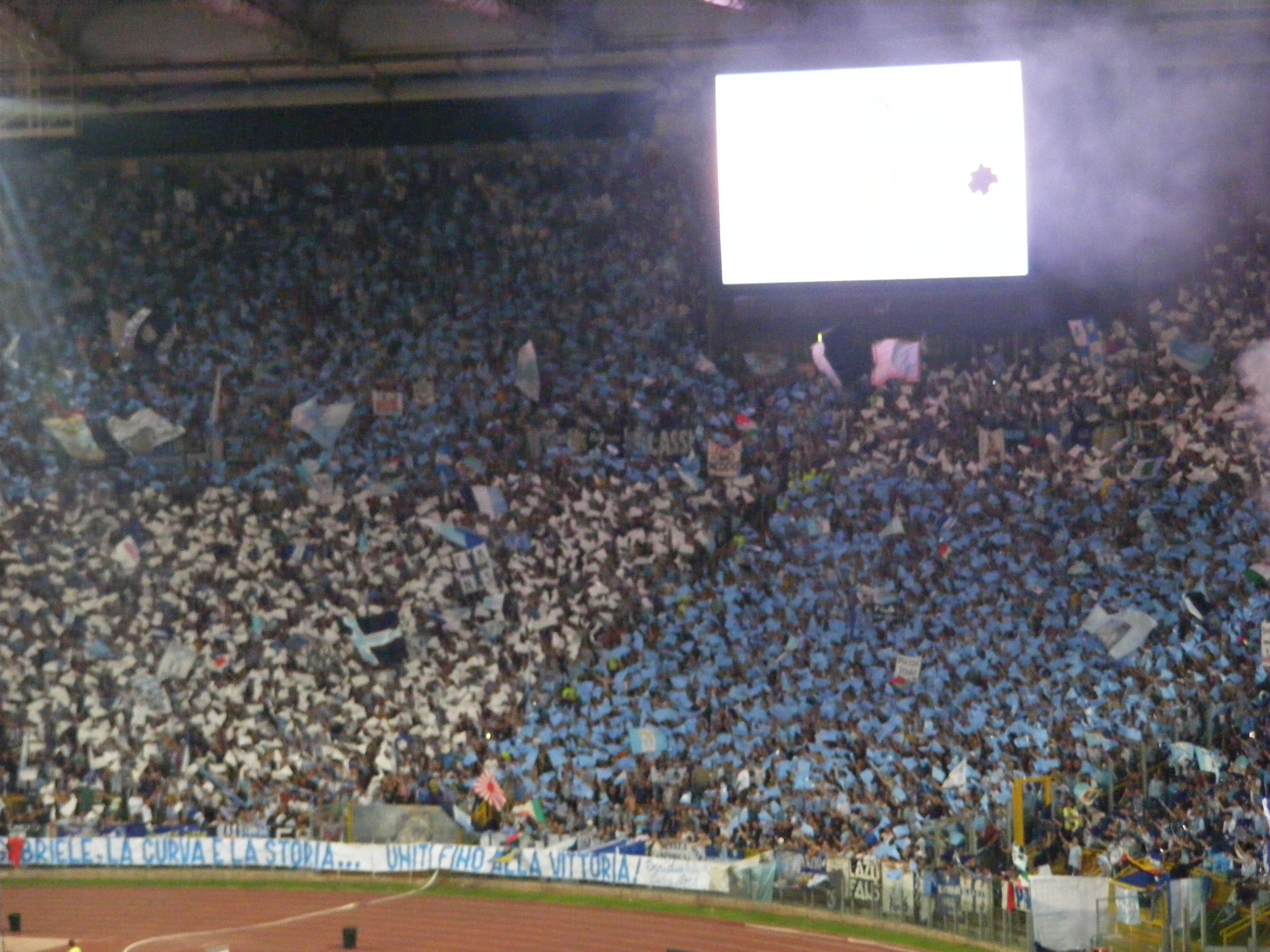
Lazio ultras

The SS Lazio fans, known in Italian as the tifoseria laziale or simply laziali, are supporters (tifosi) of Italian football club Lazio, with headquarters in Rome.

== History ==
=== Early years ===
In 1932 Lazio supporters were the first to see the creation of an organised supporters' association with a hierarchical structure. On the occasion of the Rome derby of 23 October 1932, an organised group, called Paranza Aquilotti, staged a choreographed display at the Stadio Nazionale PNF.

Later, in 1951, the Circoli Biancocelesti were founded in Rome (the first were those of Trionfale and Primavalle). They were followed by the Lazio Club.

=== From the 1960s to the 1970s ===
The history of organized fan groups of Lazio began in the late 1960s when small groups of supporters filled the steps of Stadio Olimpico in Rome. The end of the 1960s saw the emergence of the first charismatic leaders, the capi popolo, such as Leonida and Luciano. From the clubs, the youngest supporters gathered into ultras groups with "battle" names, among the first being the Tupamaros, the Aquile, the Ultras, the NAB, the Folgore, the CAST, the Marines and the Vigilantes. The first charismatic capi popolo belonged to different groups: Tupamaros, Eagles, Ultras, Vigilantes, NAB, CAST and Marines, the latter consisting mostly of younger fans. The early groups were not united and so in 1971, the first major ultras group was formed: Commandos Monteverde Lazio, also known as C.M.L. '74. In October 1976, a new club was formed in order to unify the supporters from the north to south stands under the temporary name G.A.B.A. (Gruppi Associati Bianco Azzurri). They decide to rename the group in Eagles' Supporters: the inspiration came from a member of the Brigate Gialloblù, the main Hellas Verona F.C. ultras group, who usually write "Hellas Supporters" on his letters. On 1 October 1978, during a match with Juventus in the first round of the 1978–79 Serie A, the Eagles' Supporters exposed their 56-metre banner in Curva Nord for the first time.

=== From 1978 to 1987 ===
In 1978, a group called VIKING Lazio was formed, and took their place in the Curva Sud. In this same year, the Eagles Supporters, who originally began in the south stands, made their way to Curva Nord, which became the main Lazio terrace. Other small groups followed the Eagles besides Viking. In 1979, a flare fired by a Roma fan from the opposite end of the stadium hit Lazio fan Vincenzo Paparelli in the eye and killed him. It was the first fatality in Italian football due to violence.

=== Arrival of the Irriducibili ===
During a Lazio–Padova match in 1987, a 10-metre-long banner announced the arrival of a new Ultra group on the scene, Irriducibili Lazio formed by Antonio Grinta. Irriducibili rose to power in the Curva Nord and revolutionized the way Lazio fans supported their side. No more drums were used but English chanting styles were adopted. This contrasted boldly with the Italian style of the Eagles Supporters, and by 1992, Irriducibili were by far Lazio's most powerful group as the Eagles Supporters disbanded. With the arrival of the new club president, Sergio Cragnotti, Lazio qualified for European competition becoming one of the world's strongest teams. During this period, Lazio ultras formed close ties with both Inter Milan and Hellas Verona. In addition to these, relationships with supporters of Real Madrid, Chelsea and Paris Saint Germain developed. The number of traveling Lazio fans did not drop from the "old days" though, as approximately 4,000 travelled to Dortmund and Vienna, 20,000 to Paris, 15,000 to Birmingham for the 1999 UEFA Cup Winners' Cup Final and 10,000 to Monaco for the UEFA Supercup despite being allocated only 3,500 tickets.

=== 21st century ===
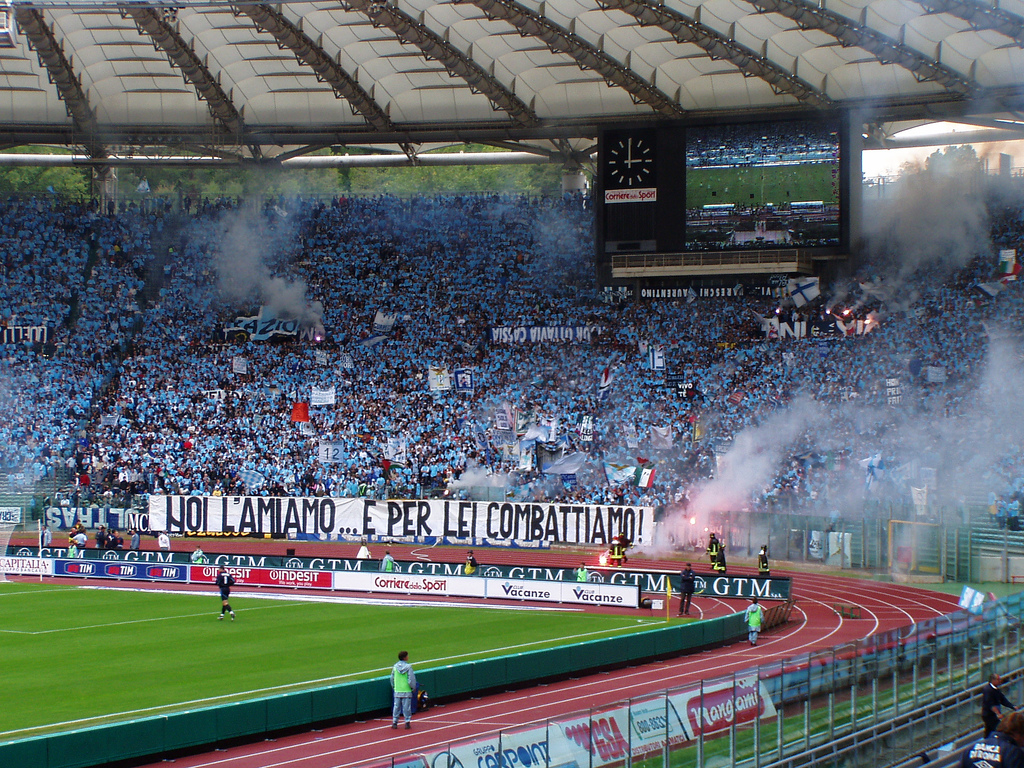
Lazio supporters in Curva Nord

The 2002–03 Serie A season was an important year for the Irriducibili as they achieved their fifteenth anniversary and in that same year, Lazio opted to retire the jersey number 12, permanently dedicated to Curva Nord. The Curva Nord was led by the Banda Noantri; a group which existed from 2000 until 2005 but then disappeared due to some of the members getting banned from the stadium or sentenced to prison. They took over the Curva Nord from the Irriducibili during the season 2009–10, when the leaders of Irriducibili decided to invite politician Polverini on to the Curva Nord, which was not accepted by the vast majority of the ultras on the Curva Nord and on Tribuna Tevere.

The leaders are members from the group Banda Noantri and from In Basso a Destra. Apart from those there are the CML '74. Groups such as Viking and Veterani disappeared many years ago. The Legione Mr. Enrich are based in the old Curva Sud–Maestrelli together with Ardite Schiere. In 2006, Sodalizio was born, allowing fans all over Italy to follow Lazio more actively, in both home and away matches. On 7 August 2019, Fabrizio "Diabolik" Piscitelli the leader of the Irriducibili, who was also involved in crime, was murdered. The newest subgroup of SS Lazio supporters was founded in 2024 in Croatia. Their name is Legia Latina in the reference of old Roman soldiers. After 33 years, the Irriducibili disbanded on 27 February 2020, citing "too much blood, too many banning orders, too many arrests."

=== Chronology ===
Note:

1971 - Formation of the Commandos Monteverde Lazio
1974 - Formation of the Vigilantes
1974 - Formation of the Commandos Aquile San Basilio Talenti
1976 - Dissolution of the Vigilantes
1977 - Formation of the Eagles' Supporters
1978 - Formation of the Viking
1979 - Dissolution of the Commandos Aquile San Basilio Talenti
1987 - Formation of the Irriducibili
1993 - Dissolution of the Eagles' Supporters
2001 - Formation of the Banda Noantri
2005 - Dissolution of the Viking Lazio
2005 - Dissolution of the Banda Noantri
2010 - Formation of the Ultras Lazio Curva Nord
2017 - Dissolution of the Ultras Lazio Curva Nord
2020 - Dissolution of the Irriducibili
2020 - Formation of the Ultras Lazio

== Demographic composition ==
A study by two researchers from the Sapienza University of Rome, Gabriele Pinto and Filippo Celata, in 2022 investigated the demographic composition of football support in the city of Rome. The research highlighted a prevalence of Roma supporters in all districts of the city: according to findings obtained through the use of Big Data, the Roma–Lazio supporter ratio in the municipality of Rome would be 2.98 Roma supporters for every Lazio supporter. The ratio would fall, when considering all municipalities of the Lazio region (including Rome), to 2.39 Roma supporters for every Lazio supporter, and to 1.7 Roma supporters for every Lazio supporter when considering all municipalities of the Lazio region excluding Rome. The districts in which it is possible to find a relatively higher presence of Lazio supporters, that is a Roma–Lazio ratio lower than the city average of 3:1, are mainly peripheral areas such as San Basilio, Ostia, Morena, Serpentara, Fidene, Settecamini, Aeroporto dell'Urbe, Bufalotta, Boccea, Appio-Pignatelli, Grottarossa, Labaro, La Storta or La Rustica. In districts such as Ostia and Castel Fusano the Roma–Lazio ratio drops to as low as 2.31:1, where Lazio supporters represent 31.15% of the total Roma and Lazio supporters in Rome. In areas where the Roma prevalence reaches its highest peak, such as Esquilino, San Lorenzo and Via XX Settembre, districts where peaks of 335 Roma supporters for every 100 Lazio supporters are reached, Lazio supporters constitute 23% (22.98%) of the total Roma and Lazio supporters in Rome.

An analysis conducted by Cronache di Spogliatoio in collaboration with YouTrend studied the distribution of supporters in the Lazio region. According to the research, Roma is overall the most supported team with 31%, followed by Lazio with 14%. For the provincial capitals, the study reports the following percentages: Municipality of Rome: Roma 39% – Lazio 13%, Rest of the Metropolitan City of Rome: Roma 30% – Lazio 13%, Province of Rieti: Roma 30% – Lazio 18%, Province of Latina: Roma 20% – Lazio 10%, Province of Viterbo: Roma 17% – Lazio 17%, Province of Frosinone: Roma 13% – Lazio 16%.

At national level, according to the annual multi-client research Sponsor Value, carried out since 2001 by StageUp and Ipsos on a reference sample of the Italian population aged between 16 and 64, in June 2024 Lazio was the sixth most supported Serie A team in Italy, with an estimated following of about 710,000 supporters; compared to previous years of the Sponsor Value survey, the biancocelesti show a clear increase in supporter numbers (520,000 in 2022, 545,000 in 2021, 547,000 in 2020 and 606,000 in 2019).

Also in Italy, based on surveys conducted by the company "Demos & Pi" on football and sports support among Italians, published in the newspaper la Repubblica and carried out almost annually between 2005 and 2024, whenever Lazio was examined it was attributed, nationally, an average supporter share of about 2–3% among those who follow football; the most recent survey, in 2023, attributed it precisely 3% of supporters while the highest value was in 2007 (7.40%) and the lowest value occurred in 2016 (1.90%). For "Demos & Pi", in 2023 Lazio supporters were distributed mainly in one of the five geographical regions examined, being the second most supported team in the Centre-south (18% in the regions of Lazio, Abruzzo and Molise, behind Roma and level with Juventus).

== Spectators ==
The biancoceleste supporters contribute to a stadium occupancy rate at the Stadio Olimpico during Lazio home matches of 63.25% in the 2023–24 season. The club's best seasonal average attendance in the league was recorded in the 1998–99 season, when Lazio fought for the title until the final matchday, with an average attendance of 53,184 spectators per match. Lazio supporters instead set the club record for season-ticket sales in the league, purchasing 41,056 tickets in the 2003–04 season.

Lazio supporters hold two attendance records: on 12 May 1974, during Lazio–Foggia, which sealed Lazio's first Scudetto, the crowd was 78,886, still the record attendance at the Stadio Olimpico for a football match; on 19 December 1982, during Lazio–Milan, valid for the fifteenth matchday of the 1982–83 Serie B championship, paying spectators numbered 65,850, an all-time record for a second-tier match.

== Political orientation ==
=== Controversial episodes ===
On 24 April 2019, during a Coppa Italia match against Milan, some members of the Irriducibili group gathered in Piazzale Loreto together with Inter's Curva Nord, unfurling the banner Honor to Benito Mussolini and making the Roman salute.

In July 2021, Elseid Hysaj was subjected to insults on social network platforms by far-right supporters after Luis Alberto posted a video on Instagram in which he sings Bella Ciao; on 18 July 2021 the Ultras Lazio group displayed a banner on the Corso Francia bridge reading Hysaj worm, Lazio is fascist!.

In October of the same year, at the end of a home match against Inter (3–1), Juan Bernabé (the falconer employed by the club), with the eagle Olympia on his arm, urged supporters in the Tribuna Tevere to chant for the Duce, staging the Roman salute, and those present followed shouting Duce, Duce. In the following days Bernabé, employed by an external company, was suspended from duty under pressure from Lazio, which also requested termination of the relationship.

In November 2021, during the UEFA Europa League match between Olympique Marseille and Lazio, the French Interior Minister, Gérald Darmanin, signed an order banning Lazio supporters from entering French territory, due to the political orientation of the core faction of organised Lazio support, which was considered likely to clash with the multiethnic and ideologically left-wing supporter base of the Marseille club. Lazio supporters were nevertheless supported by public opinion.

In September 2023, before the home match against AC Monza, numerous home supporters, failing to respect the minute of silence imposed by Giovanni Malagò for Giorgio Napolitano, sang Avanti ragazzi di Buda, ostensibly the former head of state had approved at the time of the Soviet repression of the Hungarian Revolution of 1956; the club received a €5,000 fine.

=== Racist and antisemitic incidents ===
In 1998, a group of Lazio fans unfurled an antisemitic banner which read "Auschwitz Is Your Country; the Ovens Are Your Homes". Afterward, the Italian Football Federation had ordered a passage from The Diary of Anne Frank to be read out loud before all games the following weeks. In 2000, some Lazio fans showed another banner in a match against Roma, which read: "Squad of blacks, terrace of Jews". In 2017, Lazio president Claudio Lotito visited a synagogue in Rome and brought a floral wreath in remembrance of Holocaust victims, as some Lazio fans had posted stickers of Anne Frank wearing a jersey of rivals Roma.

On 4 January 2023, during a Serie A match between Lecce and Lazio, Lecce players Samuel Umtiti and Lameck Banda were the subject of racist chants by the visitor section of Lazio supporters. On 28 November 2023, Lazio supporters unfurled anti-Irish banners before and during a Champions League match with Celtic that read "The famine is over go home f***ing potato eaters" and "Did the Fenian bastards take shower today?" in response to a banner displayed by the Green Brigade a month earlier at Celtic Park, which depicted Benito Mussolini hung upside down with the words, "Follow Your Leader." On 6 March 2025, during a Europa League match against Viktoria Plzeň, the Lazio supporters have shown "racist and/or discriminatory behaviour", for which the club received a fine of €30,000. In addition to the fine, the club also had to play the next away UEFA club competition match without supporters.

=== Lazio fans outside the ultra movement ===
Controversial incidents notwithstanding, many Lazio fans do not share the extremist beliefs of some of the ultras and have tried to distance themselves from said beliefs on several occasions. As such there have been Lazio fans who have celebrated known partisan and former Lazio athlete Ivo Bitetti, shown their support for the Global Sumud Flotilla initiative, and stood up for Elseid Hysaj when he was insulted by some ultras for singing 'Bella ciao'. Since several Lazio fans do not wish to be associated with the stereotype that has been cultivated by some ultras, some fan groups have been founded that openly take up anti-racism and anti-discriminatory stances.

== Killing of supporters ==
Vincenzo Paparelli and Gabriele Sandri were two Lazio supporters whose deaths, in 1979 and 2007 respectively, received significant attention in Italian public opinion.

=== The Vincenzo Paparelli case ===
Vincenzo Paparelli was a Lazio supporter who was killed at the age of 33 on 28 October 1979, in the Curva Nord of the Stadio Olimpico after an improvised explosive device was thrown by an A.S. Roma supporter from the opposite curva. The perpetrator, later identified as Giovanni Fiorillo, was sentenced in 1987 to six years and ten months' imprisonment.

=== The Gabriele Sandri case ===
On 11 November 2007, 26-year-old Lazio fan Gabriele Sandri, a DJ from Rome, was travelling to Milan with a group of friends to attend the match Inter Milan–SS Lazio, when he was killed by a gunshot fired by State Police officer Luigi Spaccarotella during a stop on the A1 Motorway service station of Badia al Pino in Arezzo, following clashes in which some other fans of Lazio violently assaulted a group of Juventus FC ultras with stones. This occurred when the Juventus ultras were passing through the service area on the opposite carriageway from Sandri.

Sandri was killed by a shot in his neck while sitting inside a car. Early reports suggested that a stray bullet from a gun, set to distract the group of ultras, hit the Lazio fan and killed him. An emergency meeting set up between Lega Calcio president Antonio Matarrese and police chief Antonio Manganelli decided that the game between Inter and Lazio would be called off, but the rest of the fixtures would go ahead that day, starting at a slightly later time (about 10 minutes later).

The Atalanta–Milan game was eventually suspended following unrest caused by local ultras attempting to break off the protection glass in order to invade the pitch and stop the match. Later in the afternoon, the Italian Football Federation chose to postpone also the game between Roma and Cagliari, whose kick off was scheduled for 8:30 pm at Stadio Olimpico, Rome. However, this did not prevent violent riots, as hundreds of armed hooligans attacked a police barracks and the CONI (Italian Olympic National Committee) headquarters in Rome. Although Sandri's death was later held by some to have been caused by a tragic error by a policeman who claimed his gun went off as he was running. Prosecutors then opted initially to open an inquiry into manslaughter against the policeman; nevertheless, the initial hearing held that Sandri's death was culpable homicide, and the policeman involved (Luigi Spaccarotella) was condemned to 6 years imprisonment. On appeal, the higher court not only confirmed this judgment, but increased the punishment to 9 years and 4 months as an element of intentionality was found.

In his honour, the Curva Nord briefly named the entire section after the deceased supporter.

== Gemellaggi ==
Lazio ultras' strongest friendship is with the ultras of Inter. This friendship was born around the mid-1980s and has grown stronger in recent years with the 1997–98 UEFA Cup final in Paris and the infamous 2001–02 Serie A season decider on 5 May 2002 at the Stadio Olimpico, when many fans of Lazio supported Inter, their opposition, hoping they would claim the Scudetto instead of hated rival Juventus. The match ended 4–2 to Lazio, a result which saw Inter lose their title on the last day.

Another twinning of Lazio was born during the 1980s, with Triestina. It was formed when the two sides were both playing in Serie B. During a match against Lazio, the Triestina ultras unfurled a banner, stating in Italian "Welcome Eagles, together we return". The twinning got stronger when, during a Coppa Italia match at the Stadio Olimpico, between Triestina and Lazio's hated rivals Roma, the Triestina fans displayed Lazio banners in their terrace. A friendship is held between the Lazio ultras and those of Hellas Verona. This is based on the two groups both being on the right-wing politically, and sharing the same ultras principles; however, Verona fans are twinned with those of Fiorentina, historically a rival of Lazio, which means there is only an amicizia, or friendship, instead of a true twinning. Another similar friendship is shared with the ultras of Chieti.

Since they first played in Europe, Lazio began to develop friendships at an international level. The most important are those with the Real Madrid ultras known as Ultras Sur, Espanyol Brigadas, Levski Sofia, West Ham and Wisla Krakow. The first, with Real Madrid, was born in 2001 during a UEFA Champions League match between the two teams, while that with West Ham grew from the two teams mutual love for Paolo Di Canio, who started his career at Lazio before moving to West Ham in the late 1990s and has since seen fans of both West Ham and Lazio attending each other's matches on a regular basis.

== Rivalries ==
Lazio's most notable rivalry is with Lazio neighbours AS Roma, with matches between the two teams referred to as Derby della Capitale. The Rome derby has been the scene of several actions related to the political views of the fan bases. Some of Lazio's ultras used to use swastikas and fascist symbols on their banners, and they have displayed racist behaviour in several occasions during the derbies. Most notably, at a derby of the season 1998–99, laziali unfurled a 50-metre banner around the Curva Nord that read, "Auschwitz is your town, the ovens are your houses". Furthermore, laziali have often been recorded doing the infamous Roman Salute. Black players of Roma have often been receivers of racist and offensive behaviour.

During the late 1970s, Lazio developed a strong hate for Pescara Calcio, who in return consider Lazio a rival. Since the mid-1990s, Lazio fans have not considered Pescara as a strong rivalry any more, while the Pescara fans still do, even though the teams very rarely met since.

== See also ==
- "Avanti ragazzi di Buda", a song popular among Lazio supporters
