= Giò Stajano =

Italian writer, journalist and actor

Maria Gioacchina Stajano Starace Contessa Briganti di Panico
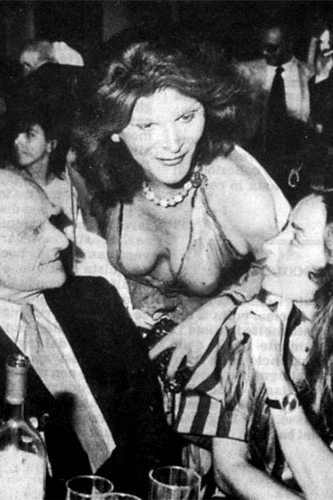
- Stajano in the 1980s
- Born: Gioacchino Stajano Starace, conte Briganti di Panico; 11 December 1931; Sannicola, Apulia, Kingdom of Italy
- Died: 26 July 2011 (aged 79); Alezio, Apulia, Italy
- Resting place: Family chapel in Gallipoli, Apulia, Italy
- Occupations: socialite, writer, journalist, actress and painter
- Relatives: Achille Starace (grandfather)

Countess Maria Gioacchina Stajano Starace Briganti di Panico, known simply as Giò Stajano (1931–2011), was an Italian socialite, writer, journalist, actress, and painter. In the 1960s, before her transition and gender reassignment surgery (1983), she was known as one of the first publicly out gay men in Italy. It is said that her night swim in the Barcaccia Fountain inspired Federico Fellini's scene featuring Anita Ekberg in the Trevi Fountain in La Dolce Vita (1960).

== Life ==
=== Early life ===
Giò Stajano was born 11 December 1931 in a small village in Salento, Sannicola, in the Kingdom of Italy under Fascism. Her father was Count Riccardo Stajano Briganti di Panico, and her mother was Fanny Starace, the only daughter of a fascist gerarca (high official), Achille Starace. At birth her gender was assigned male, and her parents named her Gioacchino Stajano Starace Briganti di Panico, abbreviated to Giò Stajano.

As Stajano herself told the story, her grandfather Achille once gave Benito Mussolini the infant Giò to hold in his arms, and the baby peed on the Duce. After the fall of fascism in 1943, her parents separated.

Giò attended the Jesuit school in Villa Mondragone, Frascati. After high school she moved to Florence to study at the Accademia di Belle Arti. Later she moved to Rome and took some courses at Sapienza University.

=== Career and popularity ===
In 1956, during the annual Art Fair in Rome's Via Margutta, Stajano exhibited her paintings, achieving some public success. She met Giorgio de Chirico, Renato Guttuso, and Alberto Moravia, began a friendship with Novella Parigini, and frequented the circles that Federico Fellini would later portray in La Dolce Vita.

In 1959 she published Roma Capovolta (Upside-Down Rome), a roman à clef based on her wild escapades in Roman high society and the burgeoning gay subculture in Italy. The authorities seized the explicitly gay book, charging her with propagating ideas contrary to "public morals" that were "harmful to customs." The scandal focused the tabloid press's attention directly on Stajano, who at the time was widely known as the "most famous homosexual in Italy."

Immediately after Roma Capovolta, Stajano hurried to publish Meglio l'Uovo Oggi (Better an Egg Today, initially, Meglio l'Uomo Oggi, or Better a Man Today), another roman à clef featuring gay life in Rome. This book described in a not-too-veiled way the private doings of various public figures. It referenced the former king of Italy Umberto II's homosexuality, giving him the nickname "Umbertina," and it featured an orgy where an actor resembling Laurence Olivier participated in drag. Another scandalous and gossipy book followed, Roma Erotica (Erotic Rome). Authorities seized both books shortly after they appeared in bookshops, but only after they had sold enough copies to further augment Stajano's growing celebrity.

Stajano became one of the most famous figures of the Roman "dolce vita." She opened a nightclub, and visually inspired director Federico Fellini by bathing in the Barcaccia Fountain in the Piazza di Spagna, just as Anita Ekberg would later do in the Trevi Fountain for the film La Dolce Vita. Fellini chose Stajano to portray one of the drag queens in the film. Stajano later claimed that, due to a dispute with the director, her shots were replaced for the theatrical release of the film, but they were later allegedly added back to restored editions for television and home release.

Besides Fellini, Stajano worked with directors such as Steno, Dino Risi, and Riccardo Freda. Between 1958 and 1961 she wrote a gossip column for the tabloid weekly Lo specchio (The Mirror).

In 1961, mostly because of her celebrity status, Giò was among those people whom the judiciary summoned for questioning over the Balletti verdi gay scandal in the Brescia area.

At the end of the 1960s she wrote for the weekly lifestyle and erotic magazine, Men. Her advice column was titled Il salotto di Oscar Wilde (Oscar Wilde's living room), and in it she replied to gay men's letters. This column was the first (and for many years, the only) feature of its type aimed at a gay audience in all of Italian publishing. In 1971 she became the editor of that periodical. During the eighties Supersex magazine photographed her for pornographic photostories.

=== Transition ===
With the birth of the modern gay activism movement in Italy, which Giò Stajano never joined, and in light of the many social changes of the late 1960s, interest in her scandalous homosexual gossip columns and news waned.

In 1982, Italy made it legal to change one's legal gender, however only after a gender reassignment surgery. Thus, in 1983, Giò Stajano decided to use that law and publicly transition. After her surgery in Casablanca under the care of doctor Georges Burou, she took the name of Maria Gioacchina Stajano Starace Briganti di Panico, still abbreviating it to Giò Stajano.

After this surgery she returned to the limelight. She gave her first interview to journalist Francesco D. Caridi of Il Borghese, a weekly for which Stajano herself had written articles under the pseudonym "Pantera Rosa," wherein she discussed the lives of the Roman aristocracy. When Caridi asked her, "Who knows what your grandfather Achille Starace would say if he saw you, he who wanted all Italians to be male and strong...?" Stajano replied: "He would say that after so much virility in the family, you need a little relaxation."

In 1992 she published her autobiography, La Mia Vita Scandalosa (My Scandalous Life).

=== Last years and death ===
In her final years Maria Gioacchina actively moved toward the Catholic Church. She declared to the press that she wanted to enter a female monastery, but that she could not do so solely because of her gender transition, which was not recognized as legitimate by the Church. Finally she did find acceptance among the Sisters of Bethany of the Sacred Heart monastery in Vische, and she entered as a lay sister.

Among her last public appearances was an interview granted to Paolo Bonolis for Il Senso Della Vita (The Meaning of Life) in 2008 and to Piero Chiambretti for the program "Chiambretti Night" in 2009.

She died in a nursing home in Alezio on 26 July 2011 at age 79. She was buried in the family chapel in Gallipoli.

In 2021 her Men advice column was collected posthumously and published as a book titled Il Salotto di Giò Stajano (Giò Stajano's Living Room). In 2021 Turin's "Lovers Film Festival" dedicated an award to Giò Stajano's memory, naming her "one of the most important and significant figures of Italian LGBTQI+ culture."

== Works ==
- Roma capovolta, Quattrucci, Roma, 1959
- Meglio l'uovo oggi, Quattrucci, Roma, 1959
- Le signore sirene, Quattrucci, Roma, 1961
- Vita d'uomo, Tipografia Giolitti, Roma, 1962 (republished by Quattrucci in 1967 with the title Il letto stretto)
- Gli uni e gli altri, Conte, Lecce, 1963
- Roma erotica, Società Editoriale Attualità, Milano, 1967
- La mia vita scandalosa, Sperling & Kupfer Editori, Milano, 1992
- Pubblici scandali e private virtù. Dalla dolce vita al convento, written with Willy Vaira, Manni, Lecce, 2007
- Esercizi d'amore, Manni Editore, Lecce, 2008 (poems by Giò Stajano and Willy Vaira)
- La mia vita (non più) scandalosa. Scritti inediti di Giò Stajano, edited by S. Cipressa, Ed Insieme, Terlizzi (Ba), 2014.
- Roma Capovolta, Feltrinelli, Milano, 2025 - reissue edited by Willy Vaira.

== Filmography ==
- Avventura a Capri, dir. Giuseppe Lipartiti (1959)
- La dolce vita, dir. Federico Fellini (1960)
- Ferragosto in bikini, dir. Marino Girolami (1960)
- Gli scontenti, dir. Giuseppe Lipartiti (1961)
- Totò, Peppino e... la dolce vita, dir. Sergio Corbucci (1961)
- La ragazza di mille mesi, dir. Steno (1961)
- Caccia all'uomo, dir. Riccardo Freda (1961)
- In the Name of the Italian People, dir. Dino Risi (1971)
- A Common Sense of Modesty, dir. Alberto Sordi (1976)
- Nick the Sting, dir. Fernando Di Leo (1976)
- Nerone, dir. Mario Castellacci and Pier Francesco Pingitore (1976)
- Un uomo da ridere – TV miniseries, 1 episode (1980)
- Il 'fico' del regime (da prendere come esempio in mancanza di esempi peggiori), dir. Ottavio Mai and Giovanni Minerba (1991)
- Tentazioni metropolitane, dir. Gianna Maria Garbelli (1993)

== Bibliography ==
- Cecilia Gatto Trocchi, Vita da trans, Editori Riuniti, Roma, 1995 (interviewed under the false name of "Claretta" ).
- Willy Vaira, Pubblici scandali and private virtù. Dalla dolce vita al convento, Manni, Lecce, 2007.
- Giovanni Ciacci, La Contessa – La scandalosa vita di Giò Stajano, Salani, 2018.
- Giò Stajano, Roma Capovolta, edited by Willy Vaira, Feltrinelli, 2025. Reprint expanded edition of the 1959 memoir.
