= Ciao marziano =

- Directed by: Pier Francesco Pingitore
- Written by: Mario Castellacci; Pier Francesco Pingitore
- Starring: Pippo Franco
- Cinematography: Carlo Carlini
- Edited by: Antonio Siciliano
- Music by: Dimitri Gribanovski
- Release date: 1980
- Language: Italian

Ciao marziano is a 1980 Italian science fiction-comedy film directed by Pier Francesco Pingitore. It is loosely based on the story Un marziano a Roma by Ennio Flaiano.

== Plot ==
An alien named Bix is sent from the planet Mars to Rome in order to learn the habits and customs of the humans.

== Cast ==
- Pippo Franco: Bix
- Silvia Dionisio: Maddalena
- Laura Troschel: Judy
- Oreste Lionello: Lazzaro
- Aldo Giuffrè: Dr. Ponzio
- Bombolo: Brigadier Pietro
- Franco Citti: Er Cinese
- Teo Teocoli: Don Paolo
- Isabella Biagini: Isabella
- Luciana Turina: Singer
- Adriana Russo: Journalist
- Giancarlo Magalli: Mayor of Rome

== See also ==
- List of Italian films of 1980
