= Caccia all'uomo =

- Directed by: Riccardo Freda
- Written by: Marcello Coscia; Dino De Palma; Luciano Martino
- Produced by: Mario Cecchi Gori
- Starring: Eleonora Rossi Drago; Yvonne Furneaux
- Cinematography: Alessandro D'Eva
- Edited by: Otello Colangeli
- Music by: Marcello Giombini
- Release date: 1961
- Language: Italian

Caccia all'uomo (translation: "Manhunt") is a 1961 Italian crime-drama film directed by Riccardo Freda and starring Eleonora Rossi Drago, Yvonne Furneaux and Umberto Orsini.

== Plot ==
Commissioner Nardelli is assigned to apprehend the notorious bandit Mazzarò, who has killed a notary and abducted a child in Sicily. Maria, a young woman who is both the lover of a local baron and the wanted bandit, holds the key to the criminal organization. With the help of the police dog Dox, Nardelli successfully accomplishes the task. Afterwards, they are transferred to Rome, where they solve the case of a model murdered in connection with drug trafficking.

== Cast ==
- Eleonora Rossi Drago as Clara Ducci
- Yvonne Furneaux as Maria
- Umberto Orsini as Giovanni Maimonti
- Riccardo Garrone as Commissioner Nardelli
- Andrea Checchi as Inzirillo
- Giorgia Moll as Anna
- Alberto Farnese as Paolo
- Philippe Leroy as Mazzarò
- Lila Rocco
- Fanfulla as Luigi Visconti
- Vincenzo Musolino as Pardino
- Aldo Bufi Landi as Baron Platania
- Franco Ressel as Capo Cameriere
- Giò Stajano as Gabriellino (credited as Gio Staiano)
- Nando Angelini
- Franco Balducci
