= Basta guardarla =

1970 film

- Directed by: Luciano Salce
- Written by: Steno; Luciano Salce; Iaia Fiastri
- Produced by: Mario Cecchi Gori
- Starring: Carlo Giuffrè; Mariangela Melato; Maria Grazia Buccella; Luciano Salce; Franca Valeri
- Cinematography: Aiace Parolin
- Music by: Franco Pisano
- Distributed by: Variety Distribution
- Release date: 1970
- Language: Italian

Basta guardarla (Just Look at Her) is a 1970 Italian comedy film directed by Luciano Salce.

== Plot ==
Enrichetta, a young peasant girl who lives in the village of Copparola di Sotto, Ciociaria, joins the avanspettacolo company of Silver Boy as a dancer. She will face the jealousy of the soubrette Marisa do Sol and the perils of love.

== Cast ==
- Maria Grazia Buccella as Enrichetta
- Carlo Giuffrè as Silver Boy
- Mariangela Melato as Marisa do Sol
- Spiros Focás as Fernando
- Pippo Franco as Danilo
- Franca Valeri as Pola Prima
- Luciano Salce as Farfarello
- Riccardo Garrone as Pelliconi
- Ettore Mattia
- Umberto D'Orsi
- Mino Guerrini
- Loredana Bertè
- Ennio Antonelli
