= Dismissed on His Wedding Night =

- Directed by: Ugo Tognazzi
- Written by: Tonino Guerra; Ugo Tognazzi; Luigi Malerba
- Produced by: Mario Cecchi Gori
- Cinematography: Giuseppe Ruzzolini
- Music by: Berto Pisano
- Distributed by: Variety Distribution
- Release date: 1968
- Language: Italian

Dismissed on His Wedding Night, (Italian: Sissignore, lit. 'Yes Sir') is a 1968 Italian comedy film written, directed and starred by Ugo Tognazzi.

== Plot ==
Oscar is a driver whom to stay in the good graces of his master, a well-known businessman known as the "Lawyer" , assumes the responsibility of a serious car accident, with 15 deaths, caused by the "Lawyer".

After three years in prison, Oscar comes out but is promptly brought to the church to marry a beautiful young woman whom he has never seen before and that is actually the lover of the "Lawyer".

== Cast ==
- Ugo Tognazzi as Oscar Pettini
- Maria Grazia Buccella as Maria Tommaso
- Gastone Moschin as the "Lawyer"
- Franco Fabrizi as Ottavio, the butler
- Ferruccio De Ceresa as Calandra
- Franco Giacobini as Facchetti
