= Paolo Mengoli =

Italian singer (born 1950)

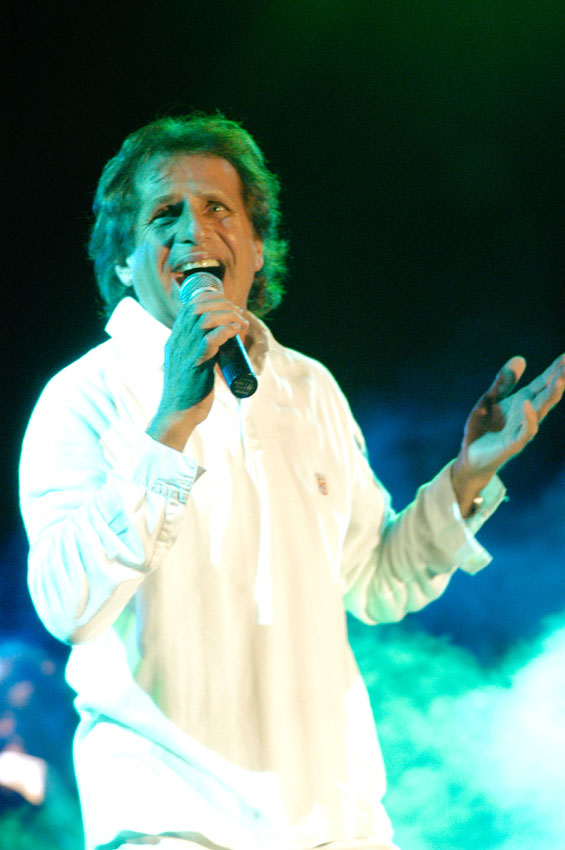
- Born: 14 August 1950 (age 76); Bologna, Italy
- Occupation: Singer
- Website: paolomengoli.it

Paolo Mengoli (born 14 August 1950) is an Italian singer, mainly successful between late 1960s and 1970s.

== Life and career ==
Born in Bologna, after performing in several local music halls in 1968 Mengoli won the Castrocaro Music Festival. In 1969 he got his major hit with the song " Perché l'hai fatto" with whom he competed at Un disco per l'estate. In 1972 he won the "Group B" of the Cantagiro with the song "Mi piaci da morire".

Mengoli slowed his activities in the mid-1970s, partially relaunching his career between late 1980s and early 1990s thanks to his apparitions on several TV-programs. He entered the competition at the Sanremo Music Festival three times between 1970 and 1992.

== Discography ==
Album

- 1970 - Paolo Mengoli (Jet, JT-40050)
- 1973 - I successi di Paolo Mengoli (Ariston Milano, OS 191)
- 1973 - Bela Bulagna (Ariston, AR-LP12105)
- 1975 - Che sarà - Paolo Mengoli in Japan (Ariston & Seven Seas, LAX 121)
- 1981 - Paolo Mengoli - omaggio ai favolosi anni 60 (YEP Record, SLL 10)
- 1986 - Piano piano in silenzio (103 Edizioni Musicali, CNT 27041)
- 1988 - Occhi (Capriccio CGD, KAP 98706)
- 1989 - Momenti d'amore (Fonit Cetra Pellicano, PL 771)
- 1991 - Perché l'hai fatto (Pull, PM 12039)
- 1992 - Io ti darò un attimo... o la mia vita intera (Fonit Cetra Pull, LPX 308)
- 1996 - Paolo Mengoli - omaggio ai favolosi anni 60 (Bebas Record - Duck Record, SMCD 312)
- 1996 - Ci sto da Dio... con voi!!! (Dub Record - 103 Ed. musicali, DUBCD 1009-D)
- 1997 - Io ti darò (Pull, PCD 2072)
- 1998 - Il sogno continua Inno al Bologna FC 1909 (TI.PA edizioni musicali e 103, 2010)
- 2000 - Quanto t'ho amato... e altre storie (D.V. More Record, MRCD - 4197)
- 2008 - La mia vita in musica (TI.PA edizioni musicali, 001)
