= In the Name of the Italian People =

1971 film

- Directed by: Dino Risi
- Written by: Agenore Incrocci; Furio Scarpelli
- Produced by: Edmondo Amati
- Starring: Ugo Tognazzi; Vittorio Gassman
- Edited by: Alberto Gallitti
- Music by: Carlo Rustichelli
- Distributed by: Titanus
- Release date: 1971
- Running time: 100 minutes
- Country: Italy
- Language: Italian

In the Name of the Italian People (Italian: In nome del popolo italiano) is a 1971 Italian comedy-drama film directed by Dino Risi. It represents a reflection about the crisis of the Italian judiciary and the growing phenomenon of corruption.

== Cast ==
- Ugo Tognazzi: Judge Mariano Bonifazi
- Vittorio Gassman: Lorenzo Santenocito
- Yvonne Furneaux: Lavinia Santenocito
- Ely Galleani: Silvana Lazzorini
- Pietro Tordi: Professor Rivaroli
- Simonetta Stefanelli: Giugi Santenocito
- Franco Angrisano: Colombo
- Renato Baldini: Accountant Cerioni
- Checco Durante: Pieronti, the archivist
- Giò Stajano: Floriano Roncherini
