= Ubalda, All Naked and Warm =

1972 film by Mariano Laurenti

- Directed by: Mariano Laurenti
- Written by: Tito Carpi; Luciano Martino; Carlo Veo
- Produced by: Luciano Martino
- Starring: Edwige Fenech; Pippo Franco
- Cinematography: Tino Santoni
- Music by: Bruno Nicolai
- Release date: 1972
- Country: Italy
- Language: Italian

Quel gran pezzo dell'Ubalda tutta nuda e tutta calda (literally "That hottie Ubalda, all naked and all hot"), internationally released as Ubalda, All Naked and Warm (though translated to Spanish as "Ubalda la hermosa, ardiente y fogosa") is a 1972 Italian comedy film directed by Mariano Laurenti.

It gained a great commercial success and launched the "commedia sexy all'italiana" genre. Walter Veltroni defined the film a "cult-title" and a title which is "a piece of Italian history".

The main actors Edwige Fenech and Pippo Franco were reunited for the similar Giovannona Long-Thigh, released the following year.

== Cast ==
- Edwige Fenech as Ubalda
- Pippo Franco as Olimpio de' Pannocchieschi
- Karin Schubert as Fiamma
- Umberto D'Orsi as Master Oderisi
- Pino Ferrara as The Irascible Friar
- Gino Pagnani as Master Deodato
- Alberto Sorrentino as Notary Adone Bellezza
- Renato Malavasi as The Doctor
- Dante Cleri as Cantarano Da Nola
- Gabriella Giorgelli as The Girl in the Barn
