= After the Fox =

1966 film by Vittorio De Sica

- Theatrical release poster by Frank Frazetta
- Directed by: Vittorio De Sica
- Screenplay by: Neil Simon (screenplay); Cesare Zavattini
- Produced by: John Bryan
- Starring: Peter Sellers; Victor Mature; Britt Ekland; Martin Balsam; Akim Tamiroff; Paolo Stoppa
- Cinematography: Leonida Barboni
- Edited by: Russell Lloyd
- Music by: Burt Bacharach; Piero Piccioni
- Production company: Delegate / Nancy Enterprises
- Distributed by: United Artists
- Release date: 15 December 1966
- Running time: 103 minutes
- Countries: Italy; United Kingdom; United States
- Languages: English; Italian
- Budget: $3 million
- Box office: $2,296,970 (rentals)

After the Fox (Italian: Caccia alla volpe) is a 1966 heist comedy film directed by Vittorio De Sica and starring Peter Sellers, Victor Mature and Britt Ekland. The English-language screenplay was written by Neil Simon and De Sica's longtime collaborator Cesare Zavattini.

Despite its notable credits, the film was poorly received when it was released but has since gained a cult following for its numerous in-jokes skewering movie stars, starstruck audiences, pretentious film critics and pompous directors, including Cecil B. DeMille, Federico Fellini, Michelangelo Antonioni and De Sica. The film was remade in 2010 in Hindi as Tees Maar Khan.

== Plot ==
On the outskirts of Cairo, criminal mastermind Okra hijacks $3 million in gold bullion. The thieves now need a way to smuggle the two tons of gold into Europe. Aldo Vanucci, a master of disguise known as The Fox, is one of the few men who can handle the assignment, but he is in prison, and reluctant to accept the job for fear of disgracing his mother and young sister Gina. When his three sidekicks inform him that Gina does not always come home after school, an enraged, overprotective Vanucci vows to escape. He impersonates the prison doctor and flees to Rome with the aid of his gang. There, his mother tells him Gina is working on the street, which Vanucci takes to mean prostitution. But Gina is merely acting in a low-budget film shooting on the Via Veneto. Vanucci realizes the smuggling job will improve his family's life. He contacts Okra and agrees to smuggle the gold into Italy for half of the take.

After watching a crowd mob over-the-hill American matinée idol Tony Powell, it strikes Vanucci that movie stars and film crews are idolized and have free rein in society. This insight forms the basis of his plan. Posing as Italian neo-realist director Federico Fabrizi, he plots to bring the gold ashore as a scene in an avant-garde film. To give the picture legitimacy, he cons Powell to star in the film, which is blatantly titled The Gold of Cairo (a play on De Sica's 1954 film The Gold of Naples). Powell's agent, Harry, is wary of Fabrizi, but his vain client wants to do the film. Fabrizi casts Gina in the film and enlists the starstruck population of Sevalio, a tiny fishing village, to unload the shipment. But when the boat carrying the gold is delayed, Fabrizi must improvise scenes for his phony film to maintain the ruse.

The ship finally arrives, and the townspeople unload the gold, but Okra double-crosses Vanucci and drives off with the loot. A slapstick car chase ensues and Okra, Vanucci and the police crash into each other. Vanucci, Tony, Gina, Okra and the villagers are accused of smuggling contraband. Vanucci's "film" is shown as evidence in court, where a film critic proclaims the disjointed footage a masterpiece. Vanucci confesses his guilt, exonerating the villagers, but vows to escape prison again. He does so by impersonating the prison doctor again, but when he attempts to remove his fake beard, Vanucci discovers the beard is real and exclaims, "The wrong man has escaped!"

== Cast ==
- Peter Sellers as Aldo Vanucci / Federico Fabrizi
- Victor Mature as Tony Powell
- Britt Ekland as Gina Vanucci / Gina Romantica
- Martin Balsam as Harry Granoff
- Akim Tamiroff as Okra
- Maria Grazia Buccella as Okra's sister
- Maurice Denham as The Chief of Interpol
- Paolo Stoppa as Polio
- Tino Buazzelli as Siepi
- Mac Ronay as Carlo
- Lydia Brazzi as Mamma Vanucci
- Lando Buzzanca as The Police Chief Rizzuto
- Tiberio Murgia as 1st Detective
- Francesco De Leone as 2nd Detective
- Pier Luigi Pizzi as Prison Doctor
- Enzo Fiermonte as Raymond
- Carlo Croccolo as Salvatore
- Nino Vingelli as a Judge
- Vittorio De Sica as himself
- Giustino Durano as the Film Critic

== Production ==
This was Neil Simon's first screenplay; at that time, he had three hit shows running on Broadway — Little Me, Barefoot in the Park and The Odd Couple. Simon originally wanted to write a spoof of art-house films such as Last Year at Marienbad and the Michelangelo Antonioni films, but the story evolved into the idea of a film-within-a-film. In his 1996 memoir Rewrites, Simon recalled that an agent suggested Peter Sellers for the lead, while Simon preferred casting "an authentic Italian" such as Marcello Mastroianni or Vittorio Gassman. Sellers loved the script and asked Vittorio De Sica to direct.

De Sica's interest in the project surprised Simon, who at first dismissed it as a way for the director to support his gambling habit. But De Sica saw an opportunity to make a social statement about how the pursuit of money corrupts even the arts. Simon believed that De Sica also relished the opportunity to take potshots at the Italian film industry. De Sica insisted that Simon collaborate with Cesare Zavattini. Since neither spoke the other's language, the two writers worked through interpreters. Simon wrote, "He had very clear, concise, and intelligent comments that I could readily understand and agree with." Still, Simon worried that inserting social statements into what he considered a broad farce would not do justice to either. Yet, After The Fox does touch on themes found in De Sica's earlier work, namely those of disillusion and dignity.

Sellers said that his main reason for making the film was the chance to work with De Sica. After the Fox was the first film produced by Sellers' new Brookfield production company, which he had formed in partnership with John Bryan, a former production designer. It was also their last production, as Sellers and Bryan had a rift over De Sica. Sellers complained that the director "thinks in Italian; I think in English" and wanted De Sica replaced, but Bryan resisted for financial and artistic reasons. De Sica grew impatient with Sellers and did not like Sellers' performance or Simon's screenplay.

Victor Mature, who had retired from films five years earlier, was lured back to the screen by the prospect of parodying himself as Tony Powell. A clip from Mature's 1949 film Easy Living (in which he plays an aging football star) appears in the film. He agreed to make After The Fox after receiving a call from Sellers. Mature also revealed that he based Tony Powell partially on De Sica "... plus a lot of egotism, and DeMille, too — that bit with the fellow following him around with the chair all the time." Mature told the Chicago Tribune: "I not only enjoyed doing the film, but it gave me the urge to get back into pictures. They were an exciting group of people to work with."

According to Simon, Sellers demanded that his wife Britt Ekland be cast as Gina, the Fox's sister. Ekland's Nordic looks and accent were wrong for the role, but to keep Sellers happy, De Sica acquiesced. Simon recalled that Ekland worked hard on the film. Sellers and Ekland made one other film together, The Bobo (1967).

Akim Tamiroff appears as Okra, the mastermind of the heist in Cairo. Tamiroff had been working on and off for Orson Welles playing Sancho Panza in Don Quixote, a film that Welles never finished. Martin Balsam plays Tony's dyspeptic agent Harry. Maria Grazia Buccella appears as Okra's voluptuous accomplice. Buccella was a former Miss Italy (1959) and placed third in the Miss Europe pageant. She had been considered for the role of Domino in Thunderball. Lydia Brazzi, the wife of actor Rossano Brazzi, was hand-picked by De Sica for the role of the Fox's mother, despite her protests that she was not an actress. Lando Buzzanca appears as the chief of police in Sevalio. Simon recalled that the Italian supporting cast learned their English lines phonetically.

The film's budget was $3 million, which included the construction of a replica of Rome's most famous street, the Via Veneto, on the Cinecittà lot, and location filming in the village of Sant'Angelo on Ischia in the Bay of Naples. The Sevalio sequences were shot during the height of the tourist season. Reportedly, the villagers of Sant'Angelo were so busy accommodating tourists that they had no time to appear in the film; extras were brought in from a neighboring village.

Simon lamented that De Sica insisted on using his own film editors, who did not speak English and did not understand the jokes. The film was later recut in Rome by one of John Huston's favorite film editors, Russell Lloyd, but Simon believed that more funny bits "are lying in a cutting room in Italy," possibly including a deleted scene in which Vanucci impersonates one of the Beatles. The voices and accents of the Italian comic actors were dubbed in London, mainly by Robert Rietti, and edited in Rome by Malcolm Cooke, who had been a post-sync dialogue editor on Lawrence of Arabia.

Simon summed up his opinion of the film: "[T]o give the picture its due, it was funny in spots, innovative in its plot, and was well-intentioned. But a hit picture? Uh-uh ... Still today, After the Fox remains a cult favorite."

Burt Bacharach composed the score and cowrote the title song with lyricist Hal David. For the Italian release, the score was composed by Piero Piccioni. The title song "After the Fox" was recorded by the Hollies with Sellers in August 1966 and released by United Artists as a single (b/w "The Fox-Trot").

== Release ==
After the Fox was released in Great Britain, Italy and the United States in December 1966. As part of a publicity barrage, United Artists announced that it had signed Federico Fabrizi to direct three films. The story was to be planted in the trade papers and then appear in general newspapers, with Sellers available for telephone interviews in character as Fabrizi. The editors of Daily Variety recognized the fictional name immediately and spoiled the gag.

== Influence ==
The scene in which Okra speaks to Aldo through the beautiful Maria Grazia Buccella inspired a similar scene in Austin Powers in Goldmember (2002), in which Austin Powers talks to Foxxy Cleopatra through the Nathan Lane character.

== Reception and legacy ==
The film was poorly received when it was released and earned mixed reviews. New York Times critic Bosley Crowther wrote: "It's pretty much of a mess, this picture. Yes, you'd think it was done by amateurs."

The Variety reviewer thought that "Peter Sellers is in nimble, lively form in this wacky comedy which, though sometimes strained, has a good comic idea and gives the star plenty of scope for his usual range of impersonations."

The Boston Globe called the film "funny, fast and wholly ridiculous" and thought Sellers' portrayal of Fabrizi "hilarious."

Billboard called the film "a series of fun-filled satires ... guaranteed for laughs" and thought that Sellers was "at his droll best" and Mature "hilarious."

Monthly Film Bulletin wrote, "Continuing the De Sica's decline of recent years, this witless comedy of incompetent crooks and excitable Italians never even begins to get off the ground" and called Seller's performance "self-indulgent," but singled out Mature as "amusing and touching."

On Rotten Tomatoes, the film has a 78% approval rating with an average rating of 5.9 out of 10, based on reviews from 9 critics.

The film has some kinship with What's New Pussycat?, which was released the previous year and also starred Sellers. That film was the first written by Woody Allen, who, like Neil Simon, had been a staff writer for Sid Caesar. Even the advertising tagline on the posters and trailer for After The Fox proclaimed, "You Caught The Pussycat ... Now Chase The Fox!". The poster art for both films was illustrated by Frank Frazetta.

The film has since gained a cult following for its inside jokes and parodies of the film industry, including directors such as Cecil B. DeMille, Federico Fellini, Michelangelo Antonioni and De Sica.

The film was remade in 2010 in Hindi as Tees Maar Khan.

== See also ==
- List of films featuring fictional films
