= It's Your Move (1968 film) =

1968 film

- Film poster
- Directed by: Robert Fiz
- Written by: Massimiliano Capriccioli; Tito Carpi; Juan Cesarabea
- Produced by: José Gutiérrez Maesso; Dennis Kirkland; Franco Porro
- Starring: Edward G. Robinson
- Cinematography: Antonio Macasoli
- Edited by: Mario Morra
- Release date: 10 August 1968
- Running time: 87 minutes
- Country: Italy
- Language: Italian

It's Your Move (Italian: Uno scacco tutto matto) is a 1968 Italian comedy film directed by Robert Fiz and starring Edward G. Robinson and Terry-Thomas.

== Cast ==
- Edward G. Robinson as Sir George McDowell
- Adolfo Celi as Bayon/Guinet
- Maria Grazia Buccella as Monique
- Terry-Thomas as Jerome
- George Rigaud
- Manuel Zarzo
- Loris Bazzocchi
- José Bódalo as Insp. Vogel
- Rossella Como
