= Il provinciale =

1971 film

- Directed by: Luciano Salce
- Produced by: Titanus
- Starring: Gianni Morandi; Maria Grazia Buccella
- Cinematography: Roberto Gerardi
- Music by: Piero Pintucci
- Release date: 1971
- Country: Italy
- Language: Italian

Il provinciale (The Provincial) is a 1971 Italian comedy film directed by Luciano Salce.

== Cast ==
- Gianni Morandi: Giovanni
- Maria Grazia Buccella: Giulia
- Sergio Leonardi: Sergio
- Tery Hare: Silvana
- Franco Fabrizi: Colombo
- Renzo Marignano: client of Giulia
- Corrado Olmi: the owner of the petrol station
- Ennio Antonelli: Giovanni's neighbor
