= Chi non lavora non fa l'amore =

Single by Adriano Celentano
- B-side: "Due nemici innamorati"
- Released: March 1970
- Genre: Pop ballad
- Length: 3:01
- Label: Clan
- Songwriters: Adriano Celentano, Luciano Beretta, Miki Del Prete

Adriano Celentano singles chronology
"Lirica d'inverno" (1969)	"Chi non lavora non fa l'amore" (1970)	"Viola" (1970)

Audio
- "Chi non lavora non fa l'amore" on YouTube

"Chi non lavora non fa l'amore" (lit. 'Those who do not work do not make love') is a 1970 song written by Adriano Celentano, Luciano Beretta and Miki Del Prete. It won the 20th edition of the Sanremo Music Festival with a double performance by Celentano and Claudia Mori.

== Reception ==
The song's lyrics, which satirized the labor fights of the period, turned to be controversial both among critics and colleagues such as Sergio Endrigo. Lietta Tornabuoni described it as "obnoxious, expressing the hostility of the petty bourgeoisie to the struggles of the working class." Beyond its political undertones, the song was also accused of depicting the marriage as a mere commodity exchange if not some form of legalized prostitution, and for its musical structure, too similar to the previous Celentano-Mori 1967 hit "La coppia più bella del mondo". Positive reviews underlined its irony and its comic wit.

== Track listing ==
No.	Title	Writer(s)	Length
1.	"Chi non lavora non fa l'amore"	Adriano Celentano, Luciano Beretta, Miki Del Prete	3:01
2.	"Due nemici innamorati"	Gino Santercole, Luciano Beretta, Miki Del Prete	3:00

== Charts ==
Chart	Peak position
Italy (Musica e dischi)	1
