= Il ficcanaso =

1981 Italian crime comedy film

- Directed by: Bruno Corbucci
- Written by: Aldo Florio; Mariano Laurenti; Sergio Martino; Raimondo Vianello; Aldo Grimaldi; Pippo Franco; Bruno Corbucci; Sandro Continenza
- Produced by: Giovanni Di Clemente
- Starring: Pippo Franco; Edwige Fenech
- Cinematography: Giovanni Ciarlo
- Music by: Franco Micalizzi
- Distributed by: Italian International Film
- Release dates: February 4, 1981 (Catania, Italy)
- Running time: 99 minutes
- Country: Italy
- Language: Italian

Il ficcanaso (lit. 'The Nosy One') is a 1981 Italian comedy film co-written and directed by Bruno Corbucci.

== Plot ==
Luciano Persichetti is haunted by a mysterious killer who calls himself "The Guardian Angel" with precognitive abilities.

== Cast ==
- Pippo Franco as Luciano Persichetti
- Edwige Fenech as Susanna Luisetti
- Pino Caruso as Inspector
- Laura Troschel as Carla Foscari
- Luc Merenda as Paolo
- Sergio Leonardi as Lino

== Release ==
Il ficcanaso was distributed by Italian International Film. It was released in Italy in Catania on February 4, 1981.

== See also ==
- List of Italian films of 1981
