= The Sex of Angels =

- Italian film poster
- Italian: Il sesso degli angeli
- Directed by: Ugo Liberatore
- Screenplay by: Franz Seitz Jr.
- Story by: Ugo Liberatore
- Produced by: Franz Seitz Jr.; Giorgio Venturini
- Starring: Rosemary Dexter; Bernhard de Vries; Doris Kunstmann; Laura Troschel
- Cinematography: Leonida Barboni
- Edited by: Franco Fraticelli
- Music by: Giovanni Fusco
- Production companies: Filmes; Franz Seitz Filmproduktion; Sargon Film
- Distributed by: Titanus
- Release dates: 24 February 1968 (Italy); 2 December 1969 (New York City); 9 October 1970 (West Germany)
- Running time: 94 minutes
- Countries: Italy; West Germany
- Language: Italian

The Sex of Angels (Italian: Il sesso degli angeli, German: Das Geschlecht der Engel) is a 1968 Italian erotic drama film directed by Ugo Liberatore, and starring Rosemary Dexter, Bernhard de Vries, Doris Kunstmann and Laura Troschel.

== Plot ==
In Italy, Nora, an heiress at odds with her father, welcomes her friends Nancy and Carla during a summer break. The plan is to take Nora's father's yacht (without his permission) and head for the Dalmatian coast of Croatia. When Nora's boyfriend refuses to join, they decide to find a desirable male with no serious attachments to take along. They meet medical student Marco at a dance club, and even though he has a casual girlfriend, he agrees to meet Nancy the next day for a swim. The three women take out the yacht, find Marco swimming along, and effectively abduct him onto the vessel.

Initially, Marco is more amused than concerned about the abrupt change in plans, and proceeds to try making time with each girl, only to find that Nancy is either lesbian, bisexual, or frigid, Carla is clearly lesbian and uninterested in him, and Nora claims she is saving her virtue for a black man. The women's intentions appear more sinister when, upon reaching Croatian waters and having to submit to inspection, Marco, who, since he was taken while swimming, has no passport or clothes, must hide while the authorities board the yacht. Once the patrol leaves, the women reveal their primary intention: to experiment with LSD, and tape record their trip since they may not remember details. The foursome ingest dosed sugar cubes and submit to the drug.

The next morning, Nora is in pain, Marco sees Nancy and Carla in bed, and discovers that he has been shot; the bullet is embedded in his chest so he is not bleeding, but is still at great risk of dying from the wound. The women remember nothing, but are reluctant to revisit the tape; Nancy hides it, fearing that the events will divide them. They pull into a port to obtain morphine for Marco. The druggist initially refuses to sell to them without a prescription, and rebuffs Nora and Nancy's offer to trade it for sex, but when Carla volunteers she is a virgin, he agrees to provide it in exchange. Upon returning to the yacht, as he grows weaker from his injury, Carla takes pity on Marco, and tries pressuring her friends to return to Italy quickly to get him to a hospital, but the other two, fearing they could be blamed and arrested, seem to be slow-walking the trip home, and actively thwart Marco's attempts to seek help.

Before reaching port, Marco succumbs to his wounds. They agree to listen to the tape to find out what happened during their LSD ingest, but the tape is blank, and Carla deduces that Nancy did not have the microphone on, deliberately sabotaging the intent. Marco's body is set adrift in an inflatable dingy before the yacht docks. The women put on a brave face back at home, but it is clear the event has broken what tenuous bond they shared before. Carla leaves Nora and Nancy, runs down to the end of a pier, and, after some contemplation, drowns herself.

== Cast ==
- Rosemary Dexter as Nancy
- Bernhard de Vries as Marco
- Doris Kunstmann as Nora
- Laura Troschel as Carla
- Giovanni Petrucci as Luca
- Efisio Cabras as Sergio
- Brizio Montinaro as Pietro
- Silvana Bacci
- Hans Jürgen Neumann

== Release ==
The Sex of Angels was first released in its native Italy in 1968 through Titanus, then in the United States in late 1969, with an X rating. Due to this, United Artists, the film's worldwide distributor, released it stateside under their Lopert Pictures division.
