= Hate Is My God =

1969 film

- Directed by: Claudio Gora
- Written by: Claudio Gora; Vincenzo Cerami; Piero Anchisi
- Cinematography: Luciano Trasatti
- Music by: Pippo Franco
- Release date: 1969
- Countries: Italy; West Germany

Hate Is My God (Italian: L'odio è il mio Dio, German: Il Nero - Haß war sein Gebet, also known as Hatred of God) is a 1969 Italian-West German Spaghetti Western film directed by Claudio Gora.

== Cast ==
- Tony Kendall: "Il Nero" / Carl
- Carlo Giordana: Vincent Kearny
- Herbert Fleischmann: Alex Carter
- Marina Berti: Blanche Durand
- Gunther Philipp: Edward Smith
- Venantino Venantini: Sweetley
- Claudio Gora: Arthur Field
- Herbert Fux: Jeff
- Valerio Fioravanti: Young Vincent Kearney
- Pippo Franco: Travelling Minstrel
- Luciano Rossi: Joe
