= Giacomo Casanova: Childhood and Adolescence =

- Directed by: Luigi Comencini
- Screenplay by: Suso Cecchi D'Amico
- Produced by: Luigi Comencini
- Starring: Leonard Whiting; Lionel Stander; Maria Grazia Buccella
- Cinematography: Aiace Parolin
- Edited by: Nino Baragli
- Music by: Fiorenzo Carpi
- Release date: 1969
- Running time: 123 minutes
- Country: Italy
- Language: Italian

Giacomo Casanova: Childhood and Adolescence (Italian: Infanzia, vocazione e prime esperienze di Giacomo Casanova, veneziano, lit. 'Childhood, Vocation, and First Experience of Giacomo Casanova, Venetian'), internationally released as Casanova: His Youthful Years, is a 1969 Italian comedy film directed by Luigi Comencini. It tells the youth of Giacomo Casanova, who, after an unhappy childhood and early ecclesiastical activity in Venice, became an abbot and abandoned his vocation for the love of a countess. Despite the plot, more than a portrait of Casanova, the film is more of a vivid fresco of the Venetian society of the time.

== Plot ==
In 1742 in Venice, the young Giacomo Casanova is in a great trouble. A few years previously, in the seminary in Padua, Giacomo had experienced his first love, though he was destined to be a priest. While Giacomo now follows the seminary, the young noble is to sneak into a palace of beautiful girls and spend the night. One day, Giacomo falls in love with a beautiful countess, so he decides to abandon his studies to become a priest for being a daring libertine.

== Cast ==
- Leonard Whiting: Giacomo Casanova
- Maria Grazia Buccella: Zanetta
- Lionel Stander: Don Tosello
- Raoul Grassilli: Don Gozzi
- Wilfrid Brambell: Malipiero
- Tina Aumont: Marcella
- Mario Scaccia: Dottor Zambelli
- Silvia Dionisio: Mariolina
- Senta Berger: Giulietta Cavamacchia
- Cristina Comencini: Angela Rosalba Mocenigo
- Clara Colosimo: Giacomo Casanova's Grandma
- Ennio Balbo: Mocenigo
- Evi Maltagliati: Contessa Serpieri
- Jacques Herlin: Monsieur Alexandre
- Umberto Raho: Il vescovo
- Linda Sini: Mother Teresa
- Gino Santercole: Baffo
- Gigi Reder: Salvatore
