= Chì chì chì cò cò cò =

Single by Pippo Franco
- B-side: "Caaasa"
- Released: January 1983
- Length: 3:30
- Label: Lupus; Dischi Ricordi
- Songwriters: Massimo Di Cicco; Ferruccio Fantone; Giuseppe Cecconi; Pippo Franco; Pierluigi Giombini

Pippo Franco singles chronology
"Che fico!" (1982)	"Chì chì chì cò cò cò" (1983)	"Pinocchio chiò" (1984)

"Chì chì chì cò cò cò" ("Ki ki ki co co co") is a song by the Italian singer, actor and comedian Pippo Franco. It was written by Massimo "Demcek" Di Cicco, Ferruccio Fantone, Giuseppe Cecconi and Franco himself, with the collaboration of Pierluigi Giombini.

The song is reminiscent of children's nursery rhymes, and is characterized by the repetition of animal sounds through various onomatopoeias; the "ki ki ki" and "co co co" of the title refer to the cock and hen's sounds, respectively. Franco performed the song as a guest at the Sanremo Music Festival 1983.

For the song's composition, Franco stated he took inspiration from the rap influences coming from the United States, which were unknown to Italian mainstream audience at the time. He joked that he considers himself a "pioneer of Italian rap, even before Jovanotti".

"Chì chì chì cò cò cò" was released as a single in Italy by Lupus and Dischi Ricordi, together with the B-side "Caaasa" (transl. Hooome), a satirical political song on rent regulation with a parody of Steven Spielberg's E.T. the Extra-Terrestrial (1982). The single was also released in Germany by label Ariola (105-352), in Greece by Music-Box (SMB-10130), and in Spain by Hispavox (549-033).

== Track listing ==
Standard edition
No.	Title	Writer(s)	Arranger/Producer	Length
1.	"Chì chì chì cò cò cò"	Demcek; Fantone; Cecconi; Franco	Giombini	3:30
2.	"Caaasa"	Bombrillo; Franco	Giombini	3:15

Disco Mix edition
No.	Title	Writer(s)	Arranger/Producer	Length
1.	"Chì chì chì cò cò cò (Rap Version)"	Demcek; Fantone; Cecconi; Franco	Giombini	6:26
2.	"Chì chì chì cò cò cò (Instrumental)"	Demcek; Fantone; Cecconi; Franco	Giombini	6:21

Jukebox edition
No.	Title	Writer(s)	Arranger/Producer	Length
1.	"Chì chì chì cò cò cò" (Pippo Franco)	Demcek; Fantone; Cecconi; Franco	Giombini (as John Bini)	3:42
2.	"AM - FM (Rap)" (Natasha King)	Pluto Kennedy; Pomerol	Giombini (as John Bini)	4:06

== Charts ==
Chart performance of "Chì chì chì cò cò cò"
Chart (1983)	Peak position
Italy	3

== Bibliography ==
- Andrea Campi (2023). Da tapum a skrt. L'onomatopea nella canzone italiana. Rome: Arcana.
