= Miss Europe 1959 =

International beauty pageant

- The contest in Italy, September 1959
- Date: September 6, 1959
- Venue: Palermo, Sicily, Italy
- Entrants: 15
- Placements: 5
- Withdrawals: Spain
- Returns: Greece
- Winner: Christl Spazier; Austria

Miss Europe 1959 was the 22nd edition of the Miss Europe pageant, held in Palermo, Sicily, Italy on 6 September 1959. At the end of the event, Hanni Ehrenstrasser of Austria crowned Christl Spazier of Austria as Miss Europe 1959. This was the fourth back-to-back victory in the history of the pageant.

Contestants from fifteen countries competed in this year's pageant.

== Results ==
=== Placements ===
Placement	Contestant
Miss Europe 1959	Austria – Christl Spazier
1st runner-up	France – Nicole Perrin
2nd runner-up	Italy – Maria Grazia Buccella
3rd runner-up	Germany – Carmela Künzel
4th runner-up	Holland – Petra Poul

== Contestants ==
=== Selection of participants ===
Contestants from fifteen countries competed in this edition. This edition saw the return of Greece who last competed in 1957, and the withdrawal of Spain.

Christl Spazier was appointed as the Austrian representative after the original Miss Austria was disqualified for being underage. Peggy Erwich, Miss Holland 1959, was replaced as the Dutch representative by her 5th runner-up, Mimi Methorst, for she was spending her year as Miss Holland in the United States. However, Methorst was then replaced by the 3rd runner-up of Miss Holland, Petra Poul, for undisclosed reasons.

=== List of contestants ===
Fifteen contestants competed for the title.

Country/Territory	Contestant	Age (Note: Ages at the time of the pageant)	Hometown
Austria	Christl Spazier	19	Vienna
Belgium	Michèle Goethals	–	Brussels
Denmark	Nettie Torp	–	Copenhagen
England	Karen MacGill	–	London
Finland	Tarja Nurmi	21	Turku
France	Nicole Perrin	–	Paris
Greece	Eleonora Apergi	–	Athens
Holland	Petra Poul	19	Utrecht
Iceland	Margrét Gunnlaugsdóttir	–	Reykjavík
Italy	Maria Grazia Buccella	18	Trento
Luxembourg	Josée Pundel	19	Grevenmacher
Norway	Berit Grundvig	19	Oslo
Sweden	Monica Nordqvist	18	Stockholm
Turkey	Figen Özgür	–	Istanbul
West Germany	Carmela Künzel	19	Berlin

== Miss Europa 1959 ==
Miss Europa 1959
- Date: June 3, 1959
- Venue: Joy-Parc, Amiens, France
- Entrants: 12
- Placements: 3
- Debuts: Martinique; German-speaking Switzerland; Romandy
- Withdrawals: Albania; Italy; Poland; Spain; Switzerland
- Returns: West Germany
- Winner: Sophie d'Estrade; France

Miss Europa 1959 was the sixth edition of the Miss Europe pageant organized by the "Comité Officiel et International Miss Europe", held at Joy-Parc in Meaux, France on 3 June 1959. At the end of the event, Sophie d'Estrade of France was crowned as Miss Europa 1959. This was the first back to back in the history of Miss Europa.

=== Placements ===
Placement	Contestant
Miss Europa 1959	France – Sophie d'Estrade
1st runner-up	Belgium – Eve Dortant
2nd runner-up	Germany – Karin Gabor

=== List of contestants ===
Country/Territory	Contestant	Age	Hometown
Austria	Marguerite Nessler	–	–
Austria	Rikkie Kraner	–	–
Belgium	Eve Dortant	22	Brussels
France	Sophie d'Estrade	17	–
German-speaking Switzerland	Carola Segesser	–	–
Greece	Catherine Tatopoulos	–	–
Holland	Julia Cohen Stuart	27	Hilversum
Martinique	Marie-Jose Azur		
Overseas France	Liliane Chambertin	–	–
Portugal	Manuela Marquez	–	–
(Switzerland) Romandy	Yvette Lavanchy	–	–
West Germany	Karin Gabor	19	–
