= Tanto pe' cantà =

1932 Italian song

"Tanto pe' cantà" (lit. "Just for the sake of singing") is a 1932 Italian folk song composed by Ettore Petrolini and Alberto Simeoni. It is best known in its 1970 version performed by Nino Manfredi.

== Background ==
The song has been described as a portrait of "the sly and indolent side of the Roman temperament". Its lyrics are partly autobiographical, and include a reference to the angina pectoris Petrolini was suffering from at the time, which would lead to his retirement shortly thereafter.

== Nino Manfredi version ==
After being recorded in the 1930s, a few decades later the song had been considered lost. In 1970, the actor Nino Manfredi was invited to appear as a guest at the Sanremo Music Festival; wanting to honour Petrolini with something original, he and Luigi Magni visited his niece, where they found the sheet music for the song, and decided to present it at the festival.

Manfredi's song was produced by RCA Italiana and was recorded at Dirmaphon Studio in Rome. Guido & Maurizio De Angelis served as arrangers, with Maurizio also serving as conductor at the Sanremo Festival. The song premiered on 26 February 1970, at the end of the first night of the 20th Sanremo Music Festival. Manfredi performed it holding a cigarette in one hand and keeping the other in his pocket. Within a few weeks, the song climbed the singles chart, peaking at number four and remaining in the charts for almost four months.

=== Charts ===
Chart performance for "Tanto pe' cantà"
Chart (1970)	Peak position
Italy (Musica e dischi)	4

== Cover versions ==
The song was later covered by numerous artists, including Claudio Villa, Gabriella Ferri, Gigliola Cinquetti, Renzo Arbore, Gigi Proietti, Edoardo Vianello & Wilma Goich, Lando Fiorini, Alvaro Amici. Ciccio Ingrassia made a parodic version of the song titled "Canto pe' magnà" ('I sing just to eat').
