= Laura Troschel =

Italian actress, singer, and model

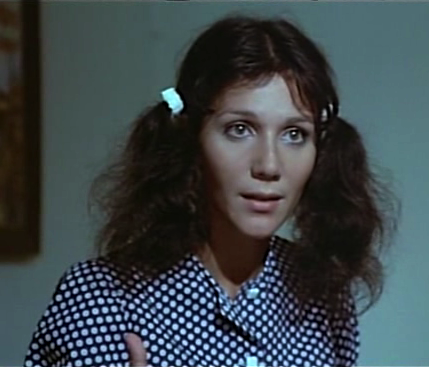
- Troschel in Furto di sera bel colpo si spera (1973)
- Born: 3 November 1944; Varese, Italy
- Died: 29 September 2016 (aged 71); Rome, Italy
- Other name: Costanza Spada
- Occupation: Actress

Laura Troschel (3 November 1944 – 29 September 2016) was an Italian actress, singer and model.

== Life and career ==
Born in Varese, Troschel made her debut in cinema in a role of weight in The Sex of Angels (1968), by Ugo Liberatore. Later, she appeared in some movies as Costanza Spada, until she became the wife of comedian Pippo Franco and resumed her original name. Between the 1970s and 1980s she participated with her husband in a number of comedy films. She was also active in television, as a presenter of some popular shows with Pippo Franco and as an actress in several miniseries.

== Selected filmography ==
- The Sex of Angels (1968)
- Four Flies on Grey Velvet (1971)
- Terrible Day of the Big Gundown (1971)
- Furto di sera bel colpo si spera (1973)
- Nerone (1977)
- L'imbranato (1979)
- Ciao marziano (1980)
- Il ficcanaso (1981)
- The Trap (1985)
- Raul: Straight to Kill (2005)

== Discography ==
Albums

- 1979 - C'era una volta Roma (Cinevox, CAB 2005, LP) (con Pippo Franco)
- 1988 - Laura Troschel (Yep, YLP 11, LP)

Singles

- 1977 - Quanto sei bella Roma (con Pippo Franco)/L'autostop (Cinevox, SC 1099)
- 1979 - Tu per me sei come Roma (con Pippo Franco)/La fornarina (Cinevox, SC 1135)
- 1980 - Scacco matto (con Pippo Franco)/La sua mano (CBS, 9094)
- 1985 - Per una donna/Vite di plastica (Video/Radio, VR 0024, 7")
- 1986 - Ma la domenica/A pensarci bene non mi piace il Brasile (RCA Italiana, BB-7573)
