= Totò, Peppino e... la dolce vita =

1961 film by Sergio Corbuucci

- Directed by: Sergio Corbucci
- Written by: Steno; Lucio Fulci; Bruno Corbucci; Giovanni Grimaldi
- Produced by: Mario Mariani; Gianni Buffardi
- Starring: Totò; Peppino De Filippo
- Cinematography: Alvaro Mancori
- Edited by: Renato Cinquini
- Music by: Armando Trovajoli
- Distributed by: Titanus
- Release date: June 1961
- Running time: 87 minutes
- Country: Italy
- Language: Italian

Totò, Peppino e... la dolce vita (a.k.a. Toto, Peppino and the Sweet Life) is a 1961 Italian comedy film directed by Sergio Corbucci.

It is a parody of Federico Fellini's La Dolce Vita, and it was filmed on the same sets.

== Plot ==
Antonio Barbacane is sent by his wealthy grandfather to Rome to influence corrupt politicians to shift the route of a motorway into their small provincial town, and thus increase the land's value. Instead of accomplishing his mission, he indulges in the pleasures of the city. His cousin Peppino, the town's municipal secretary, a moralist and an upright man to the point of ordering the removal of La dolce vita's film posters, is sent there to check on Antonio.

== Cast ==
- Totò: Antonio Barbacane/Grandfather Barbacane
- Peppino De Filippo: Peppino Barbacane
- Mara Berni: Elena, Guglielmo's wife and Oscar's lover
- Francesco Mulè: Guglielmo, a.k.a. Gugo
- Rosalba Neri: Magda, a libertine girl
- Antonio Pierfederici: Count Oscar
- Gloria Paul: Patricia
- Peppino De Martino: Minister in Italian government
- Tania Béryl: Alice
- Daniele Vargas: Daniele Fortebraccio De Pitonis (as Daniele Varcas)
- Mario Castellani: S.p.a. president
- Sergio Corbucci: Man by public telephone with flipping coin
- Giò Stajano: Homosexual man (as Jo Stajano)
