= I Married You for Fun =

1967 Italian film by Luciano Salce

- Directed by: Luciano Salce
- Produced by: Mario Cecchi Gori
- Cinematography: Carlo Di Palma
- Music by: Piero Piccioni
- Release date: 1967
- Country: Italy
- Language: Italian

Ti ho sposato per allegria (internationally released as I Married You for Fun) is a 1967 Italian comedy film directed by Luciano Salce. It is based on the play by Natalia Ginzburg.

Monica Vitti was awarded the Globo d'oro for Best Actress, while Maria Grazia Buccella won a Silver Ribbon for Best supporting Actress.

== U.S. Release ==
The film includes a nude love scene, which contributed to an "X" rating when it was released in the United States in 1969. No one under 16 could attend without a parent or guardian. It was among a record high 28 films condemned by the National Catholic Office for Motion Pictures that year.

== Cast ==
- Monica Vitti: Giuliana
- Giorgio Albertazzi: Pietro
- Michel Bardinet: The Englishman
- Maria Grazia Buccella: Victoria
- Rossella Como: Hyacinth
