= Si è spento il sole =

Single by Adriano Celentano

from the album A New Orleans
- B-side: "La mezza luna"
- Released: 1962
- Recorded: 23 July 1962
- Genre: musica leggera, pop, tango
- Label: Jolly
- Songwriter(s): Alessandro Celentano, Ezio Leoni, Luciano Beretta, Miki del Prete
- Producer(s): Walter Guertler

Adriano Celentano singles chronology
"Ciao amore" (1962)	"Si è spento il sole" (1962)	"Stai lontana da me" (1962)

"Si è spento il sole" (trans. "The sun has gone out") is a single by Adriano Celentano released in Italy in 1962.

== Background ==
The cover features a rising sun and is designed by Renzo Clerici. Giulio Libano conducts and accompanies with his orchestra. The matrices are dated 23 July 1962. Both "Si è spento il sole" and "La mezza luna" were included in the album A New Orleans, released the following year.

Si è spento il sole is one of the tracks recorded before the expiration of the contract, which Celentano's former record label, Jolly Records, released, capitalizing on the immense success of the artist's new productions with his own label, Clan Celentano. The lyrics were written by Luciano Beretta and Miki Del Prete, while the music was composed by Ezio Leoni and Alessandro Celentano, the singer's brother, who used the pseudonym Adricel. The song is a tango arranged by Giulio Libano, emphasizing its dramatic nature with strings, which are used from the very first bars of the introduction.

== Chart positions ==
The song entered 4th place on the Musica e dischi charts on 6 October 1962, moving up from 13th place. On the same day and from the same starting position, another Celentano song ("Pregherò").

It stayed within the top three spots on the chart from 3 November until 1 February of the following year for 13 consecutive weeks. During the same period, "Pregherò" remained at the number one spot, except for the week of 1 December, when the two songs swapped positions at the top, but only for one week. In conclusion, from 10 November 1962 to 5 January 1963, Celentano had two singles in the charts simultaneously, from two different record labels—his Clan label at number one and Jolly at number two. When considering the first two months of the following year as well, it became the seventh best-selling single of 1962 (while Pregherò was the best-selling overall).

== Track listing ==
No.	Title	Length
1.	"Si è spento il sole"	2:40
2.	"La mezza luna"	2:25

== Charts ==
Chart (1962–1963)	Peak position
Argentina (CAPIF)	5
Italy (Musica e dischi)	1
Venezuela (Radio Caracas)	5

== Covers ==
In 1963, the song was reinterpreted by Torquato e i Quattro and by the Spanish group Los Catinos with the title Se oculta el sol. It was also covered by Spanish singer Lita Torelló and Yugoslav singer Dušan Jakšić. In 1984, Claudia Mori recorded it for the album Claudia canta Adriano. In 2003, Vinicio Capossela recorded it for the compilation album L'indispensabile.
