= La prima cosa bella (song) =

Single by Nicola Di Bari

from the album Nicola Di Bari
- B-side: "...e lavorare"
- Released: February 1970
- Genre: Pop; ballad
- Label: RCA Italiana
- Songwriters: Nicola Di Bari; Mogol

Nicola Di Bari singles chronology
"Eternamente" (1969)	"La prima cosa bella" (1970)	"Vagabondo" (1970)

"La prima cosa bella" (Italian for "The first beautiful thing") is a song composed by Nicola Di Bari and Mogol. The song ranked second at the twenth edition of the Sanremo Music Festival, with a double performance by Nicola Di Bari and Ricchi e Poveri.

The Di Bari's version peaked at first place on the Italian hit parade.

== Recording ==
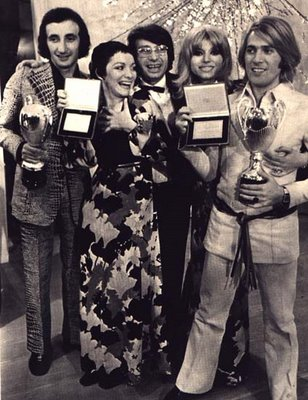
Nicola Di Bari (in the center) and Ricchi e Poveri in Sanremo 1970

Lucio Battisti, heard the song, offered to Di Bari to record a demo, in which he played the guitar, being accompanied by Franz Di Cioccio, Damiano Dattoli, Andrea Sacchi and Flavio Premoli, musicians who often collaborated with Battisti for his recordings. The arranger Gian Franco Reverberi eventually decided to use this version as the base, just adding the string orchestra conducted by the Reverberi. The song was initially planned to be performed at the Sanremo Music Festival by Di Bari together with Gianni Morandi, who after recording an audition eventually gave up.

== Legacy ==
In 2008 the Ricchi e Poveri's version was included in the musical score of the Paolo Sorrentino's film Il Divo. In 2010 the song named an award-winning film directed by Paolo Virzì; a new version of the song performed by Italian-Moroccan singer Malika Ayane was included in the soundtrack of the film and reached the fifth place on the Italian hit parade.

== Track listing ==
=== Nicola Di Bari version ===
7" single

1. "La prima cosa bella" (Nicola Di Bari, Mogol)
2. "...e lavorare" (Nicola Di Bari, Mogol)

=== Ricchi e Poveri version ===
7" single

1. "La prima cosa bella" (Nicola Di Bari, Mogol)
2. "Due gocce d'acqua" (Franco Califano, Angelo Sotgiu, Franco Gatti)

== Charts ==
Chart (1970)	Peak position
Argentina (CAPIF)	8
Italy (Musica e dischi)	1
