= Avanti ragazzi di Buda =

Italian song about the Hungarian Revolution of 1956

Song
- Language: Italian
- Written: October 1966
- Published: 1966
- Genre: Folk music
- Songwriter: Pier Francesco Pingitore
- Composer: Dimitri Gribanovski

"Avanti ragazzi di Buda" (transl. "Forward Youth of Buda(pest)"; Hungarian: Előre budai srácok) is an Italian anti-communist song. Written by Pier Francesco Pingitore and composed by Dimitri Gribanovski, it commemorates the Hungarian Revolution of 1956 and is a widespread and well-known song in Italy, having some presence in Hungary as well.

== History ==
"Avanti ragazzi di Buda" was written by Pier Francesco Pingitore in October 1966 to commemorate of the tenth anniversary of the Hungarian Revolution of 1956 and in response, according to him, to the "institutional silence on the event". Dimitri Gribanovski composed a song for Pingitore's work and it was initially interpreted by Pino Caruso. The song immediately enjoyed great success within the newborn il Bagaglino, later spreading among Roman universities.

Its first recording dates back to 1984, done by the Youth Front of Trieste.

== Success and diffusion ==
"Avanti ragazzi di Buda" is also known in Hungary among some extremist movements, being known there as Előre budai srácok. In September 2019, the Hungarian Prime Minister Viktor Orbán, who was then a guest of a demonstration of the political party Brothers of Italy, defined the song as "the most beautiful one ever composed about the 1956 revolution".

The song is also often sung as a football chant by ultras of the S.S. Lazio football team.

In 2020, it was announced that Pingitore would be awarded the Knight's Cross of the Hungarian Order of Merit for writing the song.

== See also ==
- Hungary–Italy relations
