= Sergio Leonardi =

Italian singer and actor

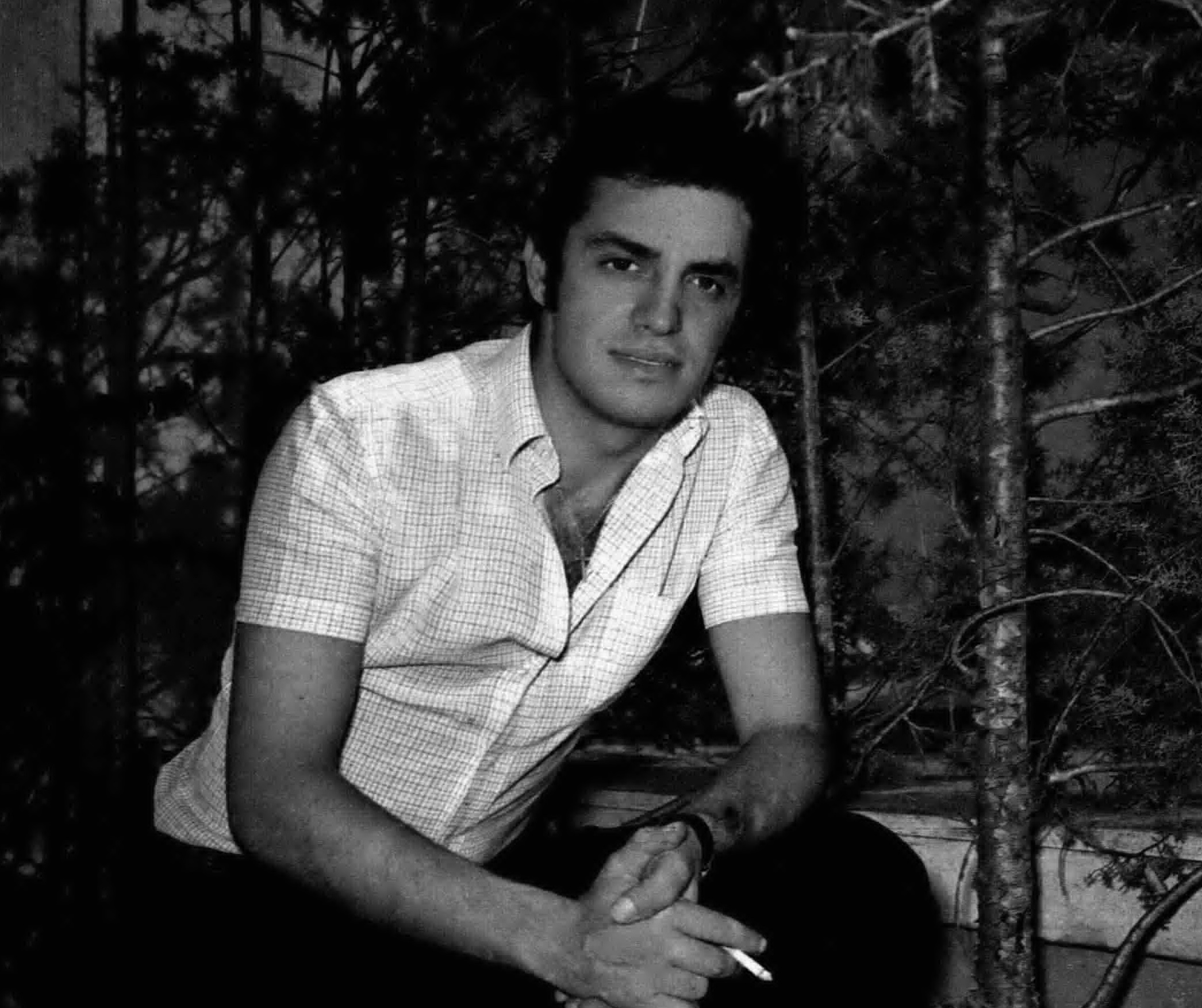
- Sergio Leonardi in 1968
- Born: 26 March 1944 (age 82); Rome, Italy
- Occupations: Singer; actor

Sergio Leonardi (born 26 March 1944) is an Italian singer and actor.

== Life and career ==
Born in Rome, Leonardi started performing as an impersonator and singer at 16 years old. Noted by producer and songwriter Enrico Polito, he made his professional debut in the mid-1960s with the single "Capri mon Capri".

Among his major hits, "Non ti scordar di me", a cover version of a famous Beniamino Gigli song, "Bambina", which won the Verde section at the 1968 Festivalbar, and "Whisky", the theme song of the TV-series Sheridan, squadra omicidi, later included in the musical score of The Sunday Woman.

Starting from early 1970s Leonardi gradually focused into acting, joining the stage company Il Bagaglino and appearing in several films.

== Discography ==
Album

- 1969: Dedicato a te bambina (Compagnia Generale del Disco, FG 5051)
- 1973: Questo è lei (Derby, DBR 69078)
- 1988: Sergio Leonardi (Compagnia Generale del Disco, LSM 1297; raccolta)
- 1991: Ricomincio da Fred (Interbeat, 9031 74282-1)
- 1999: Non ti scordar di me (FB, CD017)

== Selected filmography ==
- Il provinciale (1972)
- Silver Saddle (1978)
- L'imbranato (1979)
- Il ficcanaso (1981)
- Giovani, belle... probabilmente ricche (1982)
- I camionisti (1982)
