= Luciano Salce =

Italian film director

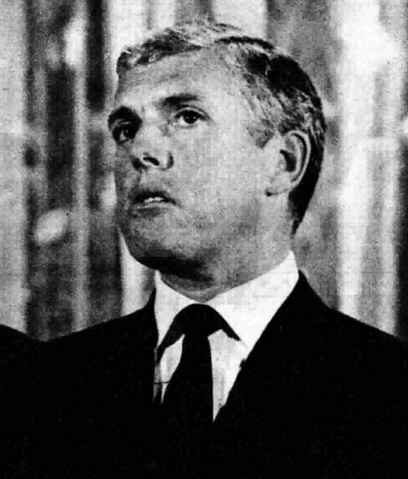
- Luciano Salce in 1965
- Born: 25 September 1922; Rome, Italy
- Died: 17 December 1989 (aged 67); Rome, Italy
- Other name: Pilantra
- Occupations: Film director, actor, lyricist, comedian, film producer
- Years active: 1961–1988
- Style: Comedies, Comedy drama, Epic movies
- Spouse: Diletta D'Andrea
- Children: 1

Luciano Salce (25 September 1922 – 17 December 1989) was an Italian film director, comedian, television host, producer, actor and lyricist. His 1962 film Le pillole di Ercole was shown as part of a retrospective on Italian comedy at the 67th Venice International Film Festival.

As a writer of pop music, he used the pseudonym Pilantra. During World War II, he was a prisoner in Germany. He later worked for several years in Brazil.

== Selected filmography ==
=== Director ===
- A Flea on the Scales (1953)
- Floradas na serra (1954)
- The Fascist (1961)
- Le pillole di Ercole (1962)
- La voglia matta (1962)
- La cuccagna (1962)
- Le ore dell'amore (1963)
- Alta infedeltà (1964)
- El Greco (1964)
- Slalom (1965)
- The Man, the Woman and the Money (1965)
- Le fate (1966)
- Come imparai ad amare le donne (1967)
- Ti ho sposato per allegria (1967)
- La pecora nera (1968)
- Colpo di stato (1969)
- Il Prof. Dott. Guido Tersilli, primario della clinica Villa Celeste, convenzionata con le mutue (1969)
- Basta guardarla (1970)
- Il provinciale (1971)
- Il sindacalista (1972)
- Io e lui (1973)
- Alla mia cara mamma nel giorno del suo compleanno (1974)
- L'anatra all'arancia (1975)
- Fantozzi (1975)
- L'affittacamere (1976)
- Il secondo tragico Fantozzi (1976)
- La presidentessa (1977)
- Il... Belpaese (1977)
- Dove vai in vacanza? (1978)
- Professor Kranz tedesco di Germania (1978)
- Riavanti... marsch! (1979)
- Rag. Arturo De Fanti, bancario precario (1980)
- Vieni avanti cretino (1982)
- The Innocents Abroad (1983, TV film)
- Vediamoci chiaro (1984)
- Quelli del casco (1988)

=== Actor ===
- A Yank in Rome (1946) − L'ufficiale americano
- Caiçara (1950) − (voice)
- Terra É Sempre Terra (1951)
- Ângela (1951)
- Floradas na Serra (1954)
- Angela (1954) − (uncredited)
- Piccola posta (1955) − Dog Wotan's Owner
- Toto in the Moon (1958) − Von Braun
- Maid, Thief and Guard (1958) − Il Conte tedesco
- Tipi da spiaggia (1959) − Ionescu − the psychoanalyst
- I baccanali di Tiberio (1960) − Coronel
- Il carabiniere a cavallo (1961) − Il prete
- The Fascist (1961) − German officer (uncredited)
- La ragazza di mille mesi (1961) − La Psicanalista
- La voglia matta (1962) − Bisigato (uncredited)
- La cuccagna (1962) − Il colonnello (uncredited)
- Le ore dell'amore (1963) − (uncredited)
- Gli onorevoli (1963) − Un invitato (uncredited)
- The Man, the Woman and the Money (1965) − Arturo Rossi (segment "L'ora di punta")
- Anyone Can Play (1967) − Psychiatrist Dr. Stelluti
- Colpo di stato (1969) − Himself
- Oh dolci baci e languide carezze (1970) − Carlo Valcini
- The Swinging Confessors (1970) − Monsignor Torelli
- Basta guardarla (1970) − Farfarello
- Mazzabubù... quante corna stanno quaggiù? (1971) − Il critico d'arte
- Man of the Year (1971) − Achille Lampugnani
- Do Not Commit Adultery (1971) − Damiano
- Hector the Mighty (1972) − Mercurio
- Anche se volessi lavorare, che faccio? (1972) − Maresciallo Dorigo
- Hospitals: The White Mafia (1973) − Enrico
- The Lady Has Been Raped (1973) − The bishop
- Three Tough Guys (1974) − The bishop
- Commissariato di notturna (1974) − On. Luigi Colacioppi
- Il domestico (1974) − The director
- Don't Hurt Me, My Love (1974) − Carlo Foschini
- City Under Siege (1974) − Paolo Ferrero
- Nipoti miei diletti (1974) − Don Vittorio
- Son tornate a fiorire le rose (1975) − Carlo Foschini
- Di che segno sei? (1975) − Leonardo
- I prosseneti (1976) − Giorgio
- Perdutamente tuo... mi firmo Macaluso Carmelo fu Giuseppe (1976) − Barone Alfonso Lamìa
- Maschio latino cercasi (1977) − colonnello (segment "L'amnistia")
- Ride bene... chi ride ultimo (1977) − Maresciallo (segment "Sedotto e violentato") / Bepi Pastorino (segment "La visita di controllo")
- La presidentessa (1977) − Bortignon
- Voglia di donna (1978) − Il matto
- Tanto va la gatta al lardo... (1978) − Dino Chini / Amilcare Severi
- Ridendo e scherzando (1978) − Lucio Sartori
- Belli e brutti ridono tutti (1979) − Santucci
- Riavanti... marsch! (1979) − Prof. Eduardo Settebeni
- Rag. Arturo De Fanti, bancario precario (1980) − Paolo Lavetti
- Vieni avanti cretino (1982) − Himself (uncredited)

== Bibliography ==
- Andrea Pergolari, Verso la commedia. Momenti del cinema di Steno, Salce, Festa Campanile, Firenze Libri, Rome, 2002.
- Andrea Pergolari, Emanuele Salce, Luciano Salce: Una vita spettacolare, Edilazio, Rome, 2009.
