= Pier Francesco Pingitore =

Italian film director and author

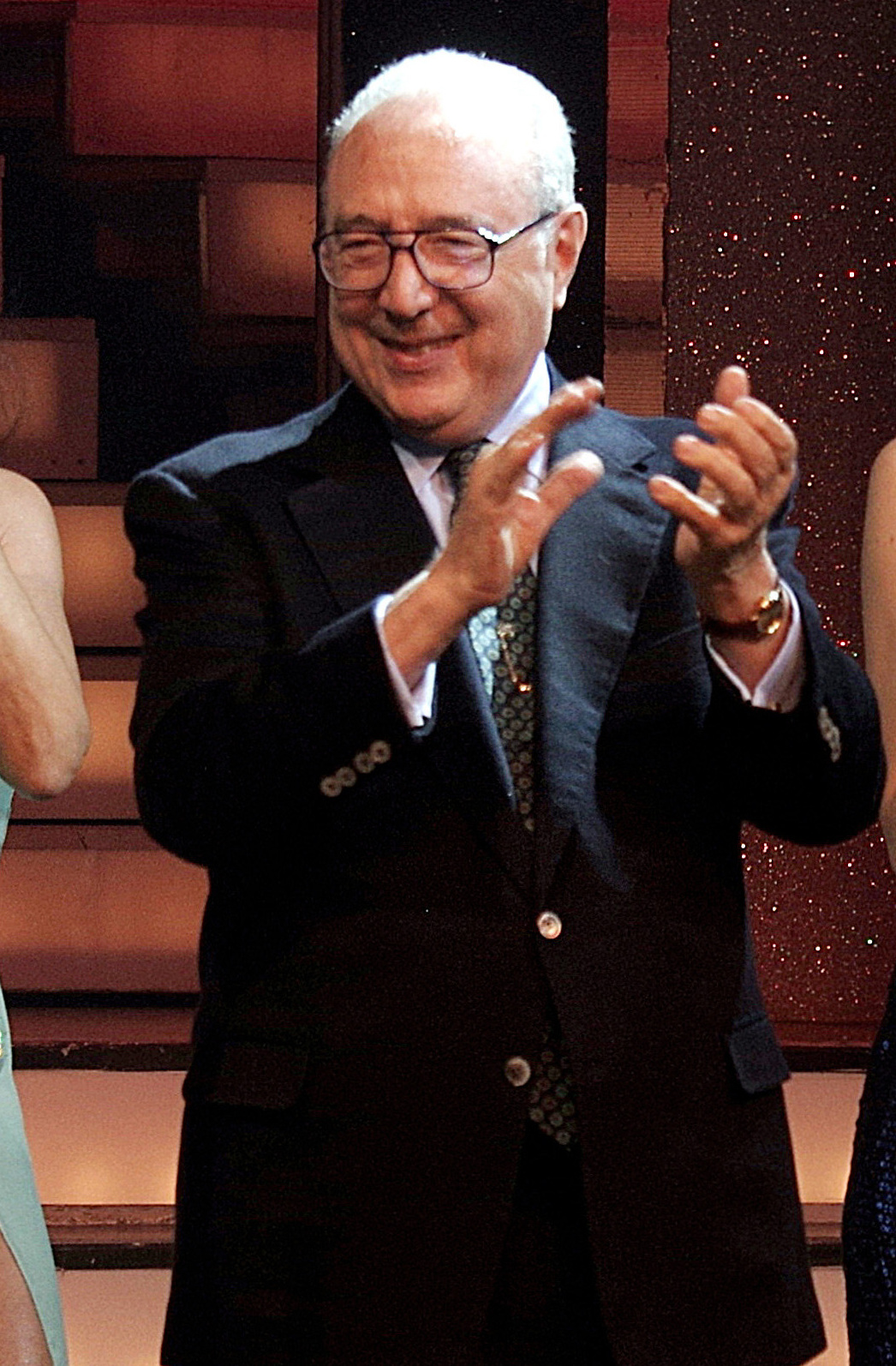
- Pingitore in 2015
- Born: 27 September 1934 (age 92); Catanzaro, Kingdom of Italy
- Occupations: Film director Screenwriter

Pier Francesco Pingitore (born 27 September 1934) is an Italian director, screenwriter, playwright and author, and co-founder of Il Bagaglino theatre company.

== Life and career ==
Born in Catanzaro, Pingitore started his career as a journalist.

In 1965, with Mario Castellacci, Luciano Cirri, and Piero Palumbo, he co-founded "Il Bagaglino" theatre company (originally named "Bragaglino" as a tribute to Anton Giulio Bragaglia) in Rome. After local success, from 1973 the stage company gained success on television with the RAI variety show Dove sta Zazà? and with its numerous successor shows. Other members of the company included Leo Gullotta.

In 1966, Pingitore released the song "Avanti ragazzi di Buda".

In 1968, Pingitore made his film debut directing a documentary about the protests of the European youth. From 1975 to 1983 and again in 1992 he wrote and directed a series of satirical comedies starring Pippo Franco along with several members of Il Bagaglino, targeting various aspects of Italian society including political scandals, football, school, and the music industry.

== Honours ==
In 2020, it was announced that Pingitore would be awarded the Knight's Cross of the Hungarian Order of Merit for writing "Avanti ragazzi di Buda".
