= Dagored =

Italian record label

- Founded: 1998
- Status: active
- Genre: Various
- Country of origin: Italy
- Official website: www.dagored-records.com

Dagored was an Italian record label based in Florence, formed in 1998.

They specialised in film soundtrack issues, including those produced by Ennio Morricone, Nico Fidenco, Bruno Nicolai and Les Reed.

The parent label, Abraxas, is now defunct.

== Releases ==
As of 2008, Dagored had released 79 titles (some were issued both on LP and CD formats):

Cat No	Artist	Title	Year
Box	Ennio Morricone; Goblin; Claudio Simonetti; Fabio Pignatelli; Massimo Morante	Blood is Red - box set comprising RED 111 (Il Gatto A Nove Code), RED 127 (Suspiria), RED 131 (Tenebre), RED 137 (Profondo Rosso) and RED 139 (4 Mosche Di Velluto Grigio)	2008
RED 101	Nico Fidenco	Black Emanuelle's Groove	1998
RED 102	Various Artists	My Delicious Spaghetti Western	1998
RED 103	Various Artists	She Had A Taste For Music	1999
RED 104	Various Artists	(Italian Girls Like) Ear-Catching Melodies	1999
RED 105	Ennio Morricone	Morricone 2000	2001
RED 106	Ennio Morricone	Le Foto Proibite Di Una Signora Per Bene	1999
RED 107	Bruno Nicolai	Agente Speciale LK - Operazione Re Mida	1999
RED 108	Les Reed	The Girl on a Motorcycle	1999
RED 109	Ennio Morricone	La Donna Invisibile	2000
RED 110	Ennio Morricone	Una Lucertola Con La Pelle Di Donna	2000
RED 111	Ennio Morricone	Il Gatto A Nove Code	2000
RED 112	Ennio Morricone	Revolver	2000
RED 113	Riz Ortolani	Mondo Candido	2000
RED 114	Ennio Morricone	Giù La Testa	2000
RED 115	Various artists	More Delicious Spaghetti Western	2000
RED 116	Ennio Morricone	Il Poliziotto Della Brigata Criminale	2000
RED 117	Goblin	Dawn of the Dead	2000
RED 118	Ennio Morricone	Slalom	2000
RED 119	Ennio Morricone	Gli Occhi Freddi Della Paura	2000
RED 120	Les Maledictus Sound	Les Maledictus Sound	2000
RED 121	John Barry	Bruce Lee's Game of Death	2000
RED 122	Ennio Morricone	Metti Una Sera A Cena	2000
RED 123	Bobby Womack	Rubare Alla Mafia È Un Suicidio	2000
RED 124	John Carpenter and Alan Howarth	Escape from New York	2000
RED 125	Ennio Morricone	Morricone 2001	2000
RED 126	Ennio Morricone	Gli Intoccabili	2000
RED 127	Goblin	Suspiria	2000
RED 128	Riz Ortolani	Una Sull'Altra	2001
RED 129	Ennio Morricone	L'Attentato	2001
RED 130	Ennio Morricone	The Good, The Bad And The Ugly	2001
RED 131	Claudio Simonetti; Fabio Pignatelli; Massimo Morante	Tenebre	2001
RED 132	Antón García Abril and Marcello Giombini	...4..3..2..1... Morte	2001
RED 133	Fabio Frizzi	The Beyond	2001
RED 134	Armando Sciascia	Metempsyco	2001
RED 135	Ennio Morricone	Il Diavolo Nel Cervello	2001
RED 136	Ennio Morricone	Giornata Nera Per L'Ariete	2001
RED 137	Goblin; Giorgio Gaslini	Profondo Rosso	2001
RED 138	Ennio Morricone	Indagine Su Un Cittadino Al Di Sopra Di Ogni Sospetto	2001
RED 139	Ennio Morricone	4 Mosche Di Velluto Grigio	2001
RED 140	Augusto Martelli	Il Dio Serpente	2001
RED 141	Ennio Morricone	Ecce Homo - I Sopravvissuti	2002
RED 142	Ennio Morricone	Il Serpente	2002
RED 143	Teo Usuelli	Mondo Nudo	2002
RED 144	Ennio Morricone	Barbablu'	2003
RED 145	Ennio Morricone	Che C'entriamo Noi Con La Rivoluzione?	2003
RED 146	Ennio Morricone	I Figli Chiedono Perché	2003
RED 147	The Cinerama Orchestra conducted by Alex North	South Seas Adventure	2003
RED 148	Gershon Kingsley	First Moog Quartet	2003
RED 149	Gershon Kingsley	Music To Moog By	2003
RED 150	Ennio Morricone	L'Istruttoria E' Chiusa: Dimentichi	2004
RED 151	Ennio Morricone	Gott Mit Uns	2004
RED 152	Piero Piccioni	I Giovani Tigri	2004
RED 153	Mohammed El Bakkar & his Oriental Ensemble	Music For A Belly Dancer	2004
RED 154	Lord Invader	Calypso	2004
RED 155	Shades Of Joy	The Music Of El Topo	2004
RED 156	The Last Poets	Right On!	2004
RED 157	Trinidad Steel Band	Trinidad Steel Band	2004
RED 158	Curtis Mayfield	Short Eyes	2004
RED 159	Ennio Morricone	Tepepa	2005
RED 160	Ennio Morricone	La Corta Notte Delle Bambole Di Vetro	2005
RED 161	Angelo Lavagnino	Gamma 1 Quadrilogy - 60s Italian Cinematic Science Fiction Sounds	2005
RED 162	Ennio Morricone	La Califfa	2005
RED 163	Ennio Morricone	Ad Ogni Costo	2005
RED 164	Ennio Morricone	L'Avventuriero	2005
RED 165	Ennio Morricone	The Library Vol. I - Musiche Composte Per Il Cinema	2005
RED 166	Ennio Morricone	Menage All'italiana	2006
RED 167	Ennio Morricone	Svegliati E Uccidi	2006
RED 168	Ennio Morricone	Come Imparai Ad Amare Le Donne	2006
RED 172	Ennio Morricone	Corleone	2007
RED 174	Piero Piccioni	L'Imprevisto	2007
RED 175	Francesco De Masi	Quel Maledetto Treno Blindato	2007
RED 176	Ennio Morricone	I Crudeli	2007
RED 177	Ennio Morricone	Trio Infernale	2007
RED 178	Ennio Morricone	L'Alibi	2007
RED 180	Paul Misraki	And God Created Woman	2007
RED 181	Marco Werba	The Horror Film World Of Marco Werba - Darkness Surrounds Roberta; Fearmakers; The Ocean	2007
RED 183	Piero Piccioni	Il Bell'Antonio	2008
RED 186	Ennio Morricone	Butterfly	2008
