= Profondo Rosso (soundtrack) =

Profondo Rosso: The Complete Original Motion Picture Soundtrack

Soundtrack album by Goblin
- Released: 1975 (Original album) 2005 (CD re-release)
- Studios: Orthophonic, Rome
- Genres: Progressive rock, jazz rock, heavy metal
- Length: 29:25 (Original album) 72:17 (CD re-release)
- Label: Cinevox

Goblin chronology
Profondo Rosso: The Complete Original Motion Picture Soundtrack (1975)	Roller (1976)

Professional ratings
Review scores
Source	Rating
Allmusic	4/5 stars

Profondo Rosso (or Deep Red) is a film soundtrack album for the film of the same name mainly composed and performed by the Italian progressive rock band Goblin, the band's first collaboration with director Dario Argento.

Argento had originally contacted jazz pianist and composer Giorgio Gaslini to score the film, but he was unhappy with his output, deeming it "awful". After failing to get Pink Floyd to write music for the film, Argento turned back to Italy and found Goblin. In the final score, only three of Gaslini's original themes were retained; however, in the film's original theatrical release, Gaslini was given full composer credit for the entire score, while Goblin were wrongly credited only as performers [i.e. "Music by Giorgio Gaslini, performed by Goblin"]. This was corrected in subsequent home video releases.

== Style and influences ==
Allmusic describes the score of Profondo Rosso as "an ambitious affair that blends jazz, prog rock, and heavy metal into an effective and totally distinctive style" and "Deep Shadows" as "a frenetic slice of King Crimson-style jazz-rock". The title track reached number one in Italy.

== Track listing ==
=== Original album release (1975) ===
1. "Profondo Rosso" – 4:56
2. "Death Dies" – 4:42
3. "Mad Puppet" – 5:50
4. "Wild Session" – 4:59
5. "Deep Shadows" – 5:46
6. "School at Night" – 2:05
7. "Gianna" – 1:52

Tracks 1–3 are composed and performed by Goblin (Simonetti, Morante, Pignatelli, Martino); tracks 4 and 5 are composed by Giorgio Gaslini and performed by Goblin; tracks 6 and 7 are composed, orchestrated and conducted by Giorgio Gaslini.

=== Collector's Edition CD re-release (2005) ===
In 2005, for the film's 30th anniversary, the complete film soundtrack was re-released on CD by Cinevox, under the supervision of Claudio Simonetti. This release includes all the music featured in the film, as well as a remix of the main theme and two sound effects tracks from the film itself. The track list for this CD is as follows.

1. "Mad Puppet's Laughs" – opening intro (original sound effect – bonus track) – 0:16
2. "Profondo Rosso" (album version) – 3:45
3. "School at Night" (lullaby – music box version) – 2:48
4. "Death Dies" (album version) – 4:38
5. "School at Night" – 0:52
6. "School at Night" (lullaby – child version) – 2:15
7. "Mad Puppet" – 5:49
8. "School at Night" – 2:30
9. "School at Night" (lullaby – instrumental version) – 2:15
10. "Death Dies" (film version – part 1) – 2:40
11. "Profondo Rosso" – 1:00
12. "Gianna" (alternate version) – 2:11
13. "Profondo Rosso" – 0:38
14. "School at night" (lullaby – Celesta version) – 2:30
15. "Death Dies" (film version – part 2) – 2:45
16. "Profondo Rosso" – 0:35
17. "Wild Session" – 5:04
18. "Profondo Rosso" – 0:48
19. "Deep Shadows" (film version – part 1) – 1:57
20. "Deep Shadows" (film version – part 2) – 1:51
21. "Deep Shadows" (film version – part 3) – 0:35
22. "Death Dies" (film version – part 3) – 2:23
23. "Gianna" (album version) – 1:47
24. "School at Night" (lullaby – Echo version) – 2:27
25. "Deep Shadows" (album version) – 5:45
26. "School at Night" (album version) – 2:05
27. "Profondo Rosso" (remix – bonus track) – 5:10
28. "Profondo Rosso" (original sound effect – bonus track) – 3:58

Notes

Tracks 3, 5, 6, 8, 9, 12, 14, 17, 19, 20, 21, 23, 24, 25 and 26 on this release are composed, orchestrated and conducted by Giorgio Gaslini; all other tracks are composed and performed by Goblin (Simonetti, Morante, Pignatelli, Martino), conducted by Giorgio Gaslini on track 7. All tracks marked as "Album version" in the CD track list are identical to the tracks on the original album, except for the main theme "Profondo Rosso", the original album version of which is a montage of several music excerpts from the film. The original album version of "Mad Puppet", which was also a montage, is not included on the CD, which however features the uncut, longer recording of the piece. In the liner notes of the CD release, Claudio Simonetti states that the original album includes heavily edited versions of the pieces as originally recorded, because of time constraints (at the time, fully instrumental soundtrack albums issued by smaller labels could have a maximum duration of 25/30 minutes); therefore the album does not represent his or the band's intentions for the presentation of the soundtrack, while the CD does.

== Personnel ==
- Walter Martino – drums, percussion
- Massimo Morante – electric guitars, acoustic guitars, bouzouki, vocals
- Fabio Pignatelli – Fender Precision Bass (fretless), Rickenbacker bass (fretted), tabla, acoustic guitar, vocals
- Claudio Simonetti – Mellotron (presets: 3-violins, church organ and 8-choir), Elka organ, Logan violin, Celesta, Fender Rhodes electric piano, grand piano, harpsichord, Moog synthesizers (Minimoog and System 55)
- Giorgio Gaslini – orchestra conductor/arranger
- Giorgio Agazzi – recording engineer
