= Nightmare City =

Film by Umberto Lenzi

- Italian theatrical release poster
- Directed by: Umberto Lenzi
- Screenplay by: Piero Regnoli; Tony Corti; Jose Luis Delgado
- Produced by: Luis Méndez; Diego Alchimede
- Starring: Hugo Stiglitz; Laura Trotter; Maria Rosaria Omaggio; Francisco Rabal; Mel Ferrer
- Cinematography: Hans Burman Sanchez
- Edited by: Daniele Alabiso
- Music by: Stelvio Cipriani
- Production companies: Dialchi Film; Lotus Films International
- Distributed by: New Fida (Italy); CIC (Spain)
- Release dates: 23 February 1981 (Spain); 17 April 1981 (Italy)
- Running time: 90 minutes
- Countries: Italy; Mexico; Spain

Nightmare City (Italian: Incubo sulla città contaminata, lit. 'Nightmare Over the Contaminated City'; Spanish: La invasión de los zombies atómicos, lit. 'Invasion of the Atomic Zombies') is a 1980 science-fiction horror film directed by Umberto Lenzi and starring Hugo Stiglitz, Laura Trotter, Maria Rosaria Omaggio, Francisco Rabal and Mel Ferrer. The film concerns a TV reporter who witnesses the collapse of a city overrun by irradiated, blood-drinking ghouls.

A co-production between Italy, Mexico and Spain, the film has been recognized as a forerunner of the "fast zombie" trope later used in such franchises as 28 Days Later. It was also a chief inspiration for the 2007 film Planet Terror. It was released in the US as City of the Walking Dead. It is not to be confused with a 1987 film Nightmare City also released as City of Shadows.

== Plot ==
American television reporter Dean Miller waits at a small European airport to interview a scientist about a recent nuclear accident, when an unmarked Lockheed C-130 Hercules military plane makes an emergency landing. The plane doors open and dozens of armed, deformed men, the scientist among them, burst out and attack the military personnel on the runway; they are impervious to most injuries and bullet wounds and are relentless in their assault, stopping only to consume the blood of their victims. Miller flees the airport and retreats to a TV station where he works and tries to alert the public, but the station is already shut down by a corrupted General Murchison of Civil Defense under security theater, locking the news crew inside with planted bombs ready to detonate in order to keep them quiet about the attackers. Miller then tries to find his wife Anna, a doctor at the local hospital, as the crazed assailants overrun the city, their ranks swollen by their former victims.

Several zombies attack the TV station, forcing Miller to flee to the hospital. That evening, a group of fiends attack the city's power station, destroying it and plunging the city into darkness. Miller arrives at the hospital as it is being attacked and manages to rescue Anna. They then flee in a stolen ambulance. Meanwhile, General Murchison meets with military officers and scientists at a hidden bunker where they find the attackers are contaminated humans who have been mutated by radiation. They speculate that the scientist investigating the leak at the state nuclear power plant was apparently infected with radiation and, in turn, infected others aboard the military transport plane, leading to the outbreak. The infected humans are incredibly strong, very fast and have lightning reflexes. However, they are unable to regenerate red blood cells, leading to their appetite for blood, because their lack of drinking blood would result in dehydration, causing their ultimate death by starvation. The only way to kill the infected is by destroying their brain. However, General Murchison repeatedly refuses to take action, claiming no zombie outbreak, only a civil rebellion which he is rather allowing.

Murchison's daughter Jessica and her husband, Bob, are on a holiday getaway in the country, oblivious to the carnage overtaking the city. Murchison sends a pair of officers to locate Jessica and Bob and take them to safety. When they arrive at the couple's campsite, however, they have already been infected and kill Jessica and Bob. Major Warren Holmes, Murchison's official aide, telephones his wife Sheila, staying at their country house, where he tells her about the crisis and warning her not to leave the house or something bad will happen. Sheila is then visited by Cindy, who is oblivious to what is going on. Two infected men break into the house and kill Cindy. Sheila then manages to kill them before they can fully attack her.

The next day, Miller and Anna get out of the city and have to stop at a filling station. There they are attacked by a small group of infected. Miller makes a Molotov cocktail and blows up the zombies, along with the ambulance. The couple continue on foot, trying to evade the zombies who are now roaming the countryside. They take shelter in a local church, only to find an infected priest, who Miller is forced to kill. Meanwhile, Major Holmes arrives at a local airbase only to find it overrun, the pilots all dead and the only survivor mad with paranoia, leaving the military with no air support. Another soldier is forced to kill the lone survivor at the airbase after he tries to kill Major Holmes upon thinking the Major is also infected. Major Holmes then abandons the base after a brief radio communication with General Murchison in which he tells the General the base is abandoned and the jets have been sabotaged, and the General tells him not to engage the zombies but just return to the base or save himself, as he actually oversees the zombies overthrowing of the city's mayor as part of his plan of coup d'etat to let the zombie virus spread all over town so he can become mayor himself. Major Holmes then flies to his house to rescue his wife, only to discover that Sheila is also infected, forcing him to kill her.

Miller and Anna escape from the church and arrive at an abandoned amusement park that is also overrun. Arming themselves with sub-machine guns and grenades from dead soldiers, Miller and Anna kill several zombies, but are forced to flee. They climb to the top of a roller coaster to escape when Major Holmes happens to fly by on his way back to Murchison's command post. Holmes lowers a rope from the helicopter, allowing Miller to climb aboard. However, Anna cannot maintain her grip and falls to her death, much to Miller's horror. Miller then jolts awake, revealing the whole story to have been a dream. He then rushes to meet a scientist at the airport. But when he arrives, a military plane makes an emergency landing, repeating the events of the film's beginning. "The Nightmare Becomes Reality" indeed.

== Cast ==
- Hugo Stiglitz as Dean Miller
- Laura Trotter as Dr. Anna Miller
- Maria Rosaria Omaggio as Sheila Holmes
- Francisco Rabal as Major Warren Holmes
- Mel Ferrer as General Murchison
- Sonia Viviani as Cindy
- Eduardo Fajardo as Dr. Kramer
- Stefania D'Amario as Jessica Murchison
- Ugo Bologna as Mr. Desmond
- Sara Franchetti as Liz
- Manuel Zarzo as Colonel Donahue
- Tom Felleghy as Lieutenant Reedman
- Pierangelo Civera as Bob, Jessica's husband
- Achille Belletti as Jim, hospital patient

== Production ==
=== Development ===
The film, known early on as Terror 2 or Terror Two, was commissioned by Knud and Anna Hansen's Compix International, a Liechtenstein-based, Italian-operated sales company which was coming off the horror hit Cannibal Holocaust. It was produced through Diego Alchimede's Dialchi Film of Rome and Luis Méndez' Lotus Films International of Madrid. The latter was involved in Mexican co-productions, including with Emilio Azcárraga's upstart Televicine, who provided some of the financing. Enzo Castellari was originally offered to direct, but he passed in favor of another project. When Lenzi was approached, the script was a standard zombie affair, which he hated. He demanded that changes be made to the story, drawing his inspiration from the 1976 chemical disaster that took place near the Italian town of Seveso. As such, he has vehemently objected to the use of the term zombie, preferring the words "infected" or "contaminated".

=== Casting ===
Hugo Stiglitz, Francisco Rabal and Mel Ferrer all returned from the crime film Vultures Over the City, another effort involving Lotus and Televicine that started filming shortly before this one. Lenzi had hoped for Franco Nero, John Saxon or Tomas Milian to star but Stiglitz, a regular of Lotus' Mexican ventures, was hired against his will to meet the demands of their transatlantic partners. The director also did not care for Italian leading woman Laura Trotter, but was overruled by the Italian producer. Spanish star Francisco Rabal, best known for his collaborations with Luis Buñuel and William Friedkin, was in the middle of a career slump. This was one of four films he did at the turn of the decade for Lotus, one of the few companies to still value him.

=== Filming ===
Principal photography started on 26 March 1980. Location filming took place in Spain. The fictional Gliswick Airport was represented by Zaragoza Air Base. The C-130 Hercules holding the infected was provided by the 311th Squadron of the Spanish Air Force's 31st Wing, which is based there, and its elephant mascot can be seen on the fuselage. The budget was so low that only a parked airplane could be procured. The landing had to be cobbled together from footage of three scheduled flights that the crew waited to arrive. Other landmarks were found in Madrid. To pass it as an undisclosed Anglo-Saxon city, the filmmakers focused on the more modern areas, such as the AZCA district or the Chamartín railway station, for scenic shots. The hospital was actually a public nursing home, while the church belonged to the San Pedro Mártir Dominican parish in Valdefuentes. The finale used the Parque de Atracciones ('Amusement Park'), in particular the Jet Star roller coaster. Interiors followed at De Paolis Studios in Rome. Makeup artist Giuseppe Ferranti did Hell of the Living Dead the same year, and would return for Lenzi's Cannibal Ferox.

== Release ==
=== Domestic ===
In Italy, a database operated by trade group ANICA lists New FIDA as distributor, but contemporary publications state that it was released by a network of independent regional distributors. The earliest major market opening took place in Milan on 17 April 1981, and it arrived in the capital city of Rome on 10 July.

In Spain, the film was released on 23 February 1981, which happened to coincide with a coup attempt against the Suárez government. It was distributed by Cinema International Corporation and drew a mediocre 309,000 admissions.

==== Promotional art ====
The film's theatrical poster, used for the Italian and Spanish releases, was noted for its resemblance with artwork made by Les Edwards for Corgi's edition of the Fred Mustard Stewart novel Starchild. Strangely enough, the similarly named Canadian film Incubus, made right after this one, appeared to have copied the same piece.

=== United States ===
In the U.S., the film was picked up by the 21st Century Film Corporation and retitled City of the Walking Dead. It belatedly debuted on 14 October 1983 in the Carolinas. The film arrived in New York on 28 October for a special midnight preview at the Guild's Embassy cinema. It then opened citywide on 4 November. It had a decent start in the market for an exploitation film, drawing about $200,000 in its first week across 35 screens. As reported by trade magazine Variety, the U.S. prints were of noticeably poor quality and bore an erroneous 1984 copyright. It was also cut by four minutes for U.S. theatres.

== Reception ==
=== Contemporary ===
Lluís Bonet Mojica of Barcelona daily La Vanguardia found the picture to be "another illustration of Lenzi's mimetism, which combines a decent enough plot with the gory spectacle of modern cannibal cinema. His film even includes a fleeting but interesting representation of nuclear vampirism, a twist on the classic vampire. Sadly, what we have here is still a thinly veiled copy of Night of the Living Dead." He nonetheless added that "Lenzi manages to keep the viewer's attention" while "allowing himself a few digressions on freedom of the press, urban jungles and ecological suicide", and enjoyed the final twist which elevated it to an "adequate product". In L'Unità of Rome, Michele Anselmi noted that Nightmare City "bears the signature of Umberto Lenzi, a prolific workman of facile carnage. [...] Unsurprisingly, the 'message' is tossed aside almost right away, clouded by the 'sick' atmosphere of contamination. Looking to previous films of the genre, Lenzi stomps with both feet on suspense and jumps right to the point, that is the classic explosion of horror and violence. The fantasy, however, leaves to be desired. But maybe it is as it should be: nightmares [incubi] are serious things, and rivers of blood are not enough to convert them into emotions."

New York-based critic Lor. of Variety found the film "[r]outine and highly derivative" with monsters "noted for their cheap, black-tar-on-face-makeup." He granted that "[s]ince Lenzi is a seasoned pro [...], City is better made than most films of this type, but lacks the humorous gaffes that make grade-Z junk watchable." Bill Kelley of the South Florida Sun Sentinel disagreed, writing: "It's hard to keep track of all these cheap, Italian zombie movies. It shouldn't be hard to remember this one for posterity though—it's the worst by far. In fact it has a shot at being the worst movie I have ever seen. If someone talks you into seeing it, shove him in front of the first oncoming car as you leave the theater." He noted that while Dawn of the Dead was "stylish and scary, this one has some of the worst special effects imaginable (the makeup falls off the zombies' faces if they move too fast), and its plot seems to have been made up as the filmmakers went along."

=== Retrospective ===
Sight and Sound referred to the film as a "spirited, if preposterous, zombie saga" with a "deeply contrived ending". John Kenneth Muir, in his review of 1980s horror cinema, referred to Nightmare City as a "cobbled together disaster". Muir went on to say it's not the worst zombie film of the 1980s which he felt belonged to Hell of the Living Dead. Louisiana State University academic Danny Shipka described the film as "absolutely terrible in every way" as well as referring to poor make-up effects, poor acting and a plot that "makes no sense". In The Zombie Movie Encyclopedia, fellow academic Peter Dendle wrote that the film is "at the best of moments, a forced and pointless test of endurance". Dendle described the zombies as "utterly unconvincing". In his book Zombie Movies: The Ultimate Guide, Glenn Kay opined that the film is "way too silly to be taken seriously for even the briefest moments" and that it is "not a good movie, but it is a ridiculously good guilty pleasure with some genuine surprises". Buzz McClain of AllMovie deemed that at first "[f]ans of psychotronic gorefests will rejoice", before "the plot grows wearisome". He added that "[w]hile there is tension, the horror elements have become comical and the froth falls flat." He conceded that "[t]he makeup effects are okay [...] and the low-budget production details are not necessarily distracting for a genre movie." Andy Dursin, video columnist for Film Score Monthly, found it "a surprisingly well-executed, low-budget 1980 thriller that offers an interesting variation on the Dawn of the Dead/Resident Evil genre of apocalyptic zombie movies."

== Soundtrack ==
The film's original score was composed by Stelvio Cipriani. It was performed by Maurizio Guarini (keyboards), Fabio Pignatelli (bass) and Agostino Marangolo (drums), coming off the recently disbanded Goblin, a progressive rock group known for their soundtracks to several Italian genre films, including Dawn of the Dead. It was recording in a single session at Trafalgar Studios of Rome, on 30 July 1980. A pre-existing song by Grace Jones, "I'll Find My Way to You", was also included. It was released on LP by Cinevox to coincide with the film's release, and reissued on CD for the first time in 1997 by Lucertola Media.

== Post-release ==
=== Home media ===
The film was released on U.S. VHS by Continental Video in 1984, in a 4:3 aspect ratio that was poorly reframed. The film was brought to U.S. DVD by Anchor Bay Entertainment in 2002. However, Lenzi had previously collaborated to a 2000 all-region, English-language DVD by Dutch-based company Japan Shock, even recording supplemental material in English. It was the first release on their Italian Shock sublabel. It was brought to English-language Blu-ray by the U.S. branch of Italy's Raro Video, an imprint of Minerva Pictures. In 2015, the film was given a restoration by Arrow Video for another Blu-ray although, by its own admission, the British label struggled to greatly improve the poorly maintained source materials.

=== Special screenings ===
In 2020, the film received a 40th anniversary screening at the Artistic Metropol cinema in Madrid, in presence of actor Antonio Mayans. The film received a retrospective screening at the 2025 Sitges Film Festival, in conjunction with the presentation of the event's Nosferatu Award (for career contributions to European fantasy film) to Hugo Stiglitz.

== Legacy ==
I like a lot of the zombie movies, like City of the Walking Dead (Nightmare City), the Umberto Lenzi one... I just love the fact that the zombies in this movie run, shoot machine guns [...] and it was such a neat idea, based on the whole Nosferatu thing, to have the plane landing with all these zombies in it... Really cool, and I had a lot of fun with it.

— Quentin Tarantino

Nightmare City has been recognized by numerous publications, including Slate and Yahoo, as a precursor of the fast zombie trend. More specifically, the film was a major influence on Quentin Tarantino and Robert Rodriguez's Planet Terror, which has been acknowledged by the filmmakers themselves. According to Tarantino, Planet Terror actress Marley Shelton also watched and embraced the film.

Entertainment Weekly placed Nightmare City in 14th place on their 2024 list of the 30 best zombie movies of all time. Director Eli Roth placed the film in 1st place on a list of his top cult movies made for Film4 in 2010. In 2014, a joint special issue of Total Film and SFX ranked it as the 19th best zombie film to date.

In retrospective interviews, Lenzi has emphasized the film's anti-nuclear and anti-military message, and even presented the contamination angle as an AIDS parable. While genre historian Glenn Kay cast doubt on this high-brow stance, the film's ecological pretensions have been acknowledged in a few academic works, such as periodical Film Criticism and the 2012 book Toxic Matters: Narrating Italy's Dioxin.

=== Remake ===
Fangoria announced in 2015 that Tom Savini, who appeared in Planet Terror, would be directing an actual remake of the film. The project raised over $138,000 from fans via Indiegogo, which was meant to attract further interest from mainstream backers, for a projected 2016 filming start. However, as of 2026, the film has not gone into production.

== See also ==
- List of horror films of 1980
- List of Italian films of 1980
- List of zombie films
