= Suspiria (1977 soundtrack) =

1977 album by Goblin

Suspiria: The Complete Original Motion Picture Soundtrack

Soundtrack album by Goblin
- Released: June 15, 1977
- Genre: Progressive rock
- Length: 41:23
- Label: Cinevox

Goblin chronology
Roller (1976)	Suspiria: The Complete Original Motion Picture Soundtrack (1977)	La villa della droga (1977)

Original record cover

Professional ratings
Review scores
Source	Rating
AllMusic	4.5/5 stars

The soundtrack to the film Suspiria was composed and performed by the Italian band Goblin. A single version of the title track, "Suspiria", was released with the B-side "Blind Concert".

The title song from the soundtrack was featured in the trailer for the 2011 film Jane Eyre.

In 2018, Claudio Simonetti's incarnation of the band went on the Suspiria Tour to coincide with the release of the film's 2018 remake. The band performed the soundtrack in its entirety with a live screening of the original film.

== Legacy ==
Due to the film's success and legacy, the soundtrack remains one of Goblin's most popular albums. In an interview with Fact Magazine, Simonetti referred to the album as the band's masterpiece.

== Track listing ==
All tracks are written by Goblin.

No.	Title	Length
1.	"Suspiria"	6:01
2.	"Witch"	3:12
3.	"Opening to the Sighs"	0:32
4.	"Sighs"	5:16
5.	"Markos"	4:05
6.	"Black Forest"	6:08
7.	"Blind Concert"	6:16
8.	"Death Valzer"	1:51

20th Anniversary Edition bonus tracks
No.	Title	Length
9.	"Suspiria (Celesta and Bells)"	1:34
10.	"Suspiria (Narration)"	1:48
11.	"Suspiria (Intro)"	0:32
12.	"Markos" (alternate version)	4:09

30th Anniversary Edition track listing
No.	Title	Length
1.	"Suspiria"	6:01
2.	"Witch"	3:12
3.	"Opening to the Sighs"	0:32
4.	"Sighs"	5:16
5.	"Markos"	4:05
6.	"Black Forest" (Blind Concert Original Film Edit)	12:35
7.	"Death Valzer"	1:51
8.	"Suspiria (Celesta and Bells)"	1:34
9.	"Suspiria (Narration)"	1:48
10.	"Suspiria (Intro)"	0:32
11.	"Markos" (alternate version)	4:09
12.	"Suspiria" (alternate version)	3:51

40th Anniversary Edition bonus tracks
No.	Title	Length
9.	"Suspiria (Celesta and Bells)"	1:36
10.	"Dario Argento Speaks About the Genesis of the Soundtrack"	0:35
11.	"Suspiria (Narration)"	1:50
12.	"Suspiria (Intro)"	0:34
13.	"Agostino Marangolo Speaks About the Differences Between Suspiria and Profondo Rosso"	0:36
14.	"Claudio Simonetti Speaks About the Main Theme"	0:32
15.	"Markos" (alternate version)	4:12
16.	"Massimo Morante Speaks About the Use of the Bouzouki"	0:58
17.	"Fabio Pignatelli Speaks About Experimentation in Music"	0:32
18.	"Suspiria" (alternate take)	3:51
19.	"Suspiria (Intro #2)"	0:31
20.	"Suspiria (Main Titles)"	1:00
21.	"Witch (Film Version)"	2:40
22.	"Markos (Alternate Version #2)"	1:43

== Personnel ==
Goblin

- Agostino Marangolo: drums, percussion, vocals
- Massimo Morante: Electric guitars, acoustic guitars, bouzouki, vocals
- Fabio Pignatelli: Fender Precision Bass (fretless), Rickenbacker bass (fretted), tabla, acoustic guitar, vocals
- Claudio Simonetti: Mellotron (presets: 3-Violins, church organ and 8-Choir), Elka organ, Logan violin, Celesta, Fender Rhodes electric piano, grand piano, Moog synthesizers (Minimoog and System 55)

Additional

- Antonio Marangolo: Saxophone (on "Black Forest")
- Maurizio Guarini (uncredited): Additional keyboards, including the Moog synthesizers and other keyboards listed on Roller
