= Maurizio Guarini =

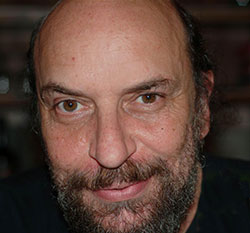
- Maurizio Guarini

Background information
- Born: Maurizio Guarini; January 25, 1955 (age 71); Rome, Italy
- Genres: prog rock, jazz rock, fusion
- Occupations: Musician, composer, record producer, arranger
- Instruments: Keyboards, bass
- Years active: 1974–present
- Label: BackToTheFudda
- Website: www.maurizioguarini.com

Maurizio Guarini is a self-taught keyboardist, multi-instrumentalist and composer, best known as a member of the progressive rock band Goblin.

== Biography ==
Born in Rome, Italy in 1955, Guarini started playing organ and guitar at the age of 10. He started playing live at high school concerts with some rock bands. Later, his music exploration moved on to progressive / jazz-rock. After graduating from high school in 1973, he attended the Math faculty at the University La Sapienza in Rome.

In spring 1975 Massimo Morante from Goblin invited Guarini to join the band, just after Deep Red was released. Starting with the very first concert in September 1975, Goblin, that reached top of the charts at that time, kept touring Italy until the end of 1976.
In March 1976 Goblin released the album Roller.

Just after three days of recording of the score for the movie Suspiria, on November 23, 1976, Guarini temporarily left the band. Late in 1978, after two years of studio work mainly in studio at RCA Records in Rome, Guarini re-joined Goblin, with a different line-up. Production of the band in the following years includes scores for the movies Patrick (1978), Buio Omega (1979), Contamination (1980), St.Helene's (1981), Notturno (1983) and the non-movie related album Volo (1982).

In parallel, during this years, Guarini collaborated with other musicians, mainly with the Italian composer Fabio Frizzi, and performed as session musician in several scores, mostly for movies directed by Italian director Lucio Fulci: The Beyond, City of Living Dead, Zombi 2 and others. Still about film scoring, in 1984 Maurizio started a cooperation with the Italian Composer Pino Donaggio, with whom he collaborated on 25 soundtracks.

Other non movie-related activities up to 1990 include collaborations with Italian artists, in studio production and in live concerts.

In 1993 Guarini earned a bachelor's degree in Computer Science.

In November 1998 Guarini and his wife moved to Toronto, Canada, and for a few years worked mainly in software development.

In 2003 former Goblin bandmates Massimo Morante and Fabio Pignatelli contacted Guarini with the idea to restart the dormant Goblin. The new band, under the name BackToTheGoblin, worked two years to realize the new album BackToTheGoblin 2005, released at the beginning of 2006, with the Canadian independent label BackToTheFudda.

In 2007 Guarini founded a trio with Great Bob Scott and Chris Gartner, former members of the Canadian band Look People. The band, named Orco Muto, played live in Canada, mostly performing revisited Goblin tunes, with the addition of some original compositions.

In 2009 Goblin started a European tour, but in December the band split again. In March 2010 Guarini and Morante asked the original founder Claudio Simonetti to re-join the band, and founded New Goblin, with a new line-up. New Goblin started a World tour that included Europe, Japan and Australia, and released two live albums recorded in Rome and in Tokyo in 2011.

Guarini released his first solo album, Creatures from a Drawer, in January 2013

Guarini has recently begun work on new material for his follow up record to 2013's Creatures from a Drawer.

Guarini was invited by legendary French progressive rock ensemble MAGMA to support and showcase live the world premiere of his new group MAURIZIO GUARINI CIRCLE in Toronto, Canada on April 2, 2016, at The Opera House. More plans for Canadian, U.S., Japanese and European festival appearances are in development.

== Discography ==
=== Solo albums ===
2013 Creatures from a Drawer

=== Goblin ===
- 1976 Chi
- 1976 Roller
- 1977 Suspiria
- 1979 Patrick
- 1979 Buio Omega
- 1980 Contamination
- 1981 St. Helens
- 1982 Volo
- 1983 Notturno
- 2006 BackToTheGoblin
- 2012 Two Concerts in Tokyo (DVD)
- 2012 Live in Roma
- 2015 Four of a Kind

=== Guest appearances and additional discography ===
- Enrico Simonetti - Gamma 1975
- Riccardo Cocciante - E io Canto 1979 + arrangements
- Dario Farina - Destinazione Tu 1979
- Antonello Venditti - Buona Domenica 1979
- Enzo Carella - Barbara e altri Carella 1979 + arrangements
- Starter - Pole Position 1979
- Rita Pavone - RP '80 1979
- Martine Michellod - Martine M. and the BVD' ensemble 1979
- Edoardo De Angelis - Anche meglio di Garibaldi 1980
- New Perigeo - Effetto Amore 1981
- Gianni Togni - Le mie strade 1981
- Massimo Morante - Corpo a corpo 1982
- Beppe Dati - Beppe Dati 1982
- Piero Finà - Indeformabile 1982
- Nada - Smalto 1983
- Massimo Morante - Esclusivo 1983
- Renato Zero - Calore 1983
- Adriano Pappalardo - Oh! Era ora 1983
- Scialpi - Estensioni 1983
- Anna Maria Nazzaro - Anna Maria Nazzaro 1984
- Nada - Noi non cresceremo mai 1984
- Patty Pravo - Occulte persuasioni/Per una Bambola 1984 + arrangements
- Franco Bracardi - Bracardevolmente 1986 + arrangements
- Lucio Quarantotto - Ehi la' 1986 + arrangements
- Grazia Di Michele - L'amore e' un pericolo 1988 + arrangements
- Patty Pravo - Oltre l'Eden 1989 + arrangements
- Enzo Carella - Carella De Carellis 1992 + arrangements
- Samsas Traum – Anleitung Zum Totsein 2011
- Various Artists - Prog Exhibition 2 (live with Goblin/Steve Hackett) 2012

=== Other collaborations in studio production ===
- Lucio Battisti
- Gianni Morandi
- Mia Martini
- Maurizio Giammarco
- Perigeo
- Camaleonti
- Alunni del sole
- Bruno Lauzi
- Goran Kuzminac
- Mario Zanotelli
- Alberto Macario
- Linda Lee
- Don Backy
- Ivan Graziani
- Sergio Caputo
- Gino Santercole
- Daniela Davoli
- Rokko
- Tony Esposito
- Sammy Barbot
- Donato Ciresi
- Gianni Bedori

== Film Scores ==
=== As Goblin ===
- The Solitude of Prime Numbers 2010 (Saverio Costanzo)- opening titles
- Notturno 1983 (Giorgio Bontempi)
- St. Helens 1981 (Ernest Pintoff)
- Contamination 1980 (Luigi Cozzi)
- Patrick 1979 (Richard Franklin)
- Buio Omega 1979 (Joe D'Amato)
- Martin 1977 (George A. Romero)
- Suspiria 1976 (Dario Argento)

=== Other soundtrack work as performer or composer ===
- - Gamma (TV) 1975 (Salvatore Nocita, E.Simonetti) Kb
- - Schock 1977 (Mario Bava, Libra) Kb
- - White Pop Jesus 1980 (Luigi Petrini, Bixio/Tempera) Kb
- - The Gates of Hell (City of the living Dead) 1980 (Lucio Fulci, F.Frizzi) Kb
- - Zombi 2 a.k.a. - Zombie 1980 (Lucio Fulci, F.Frizzi) Kb
- - Segni particolari: bellissimo 1983 (Franco Castellano, Gino Santercole) kb
- - Hercules 1983 (Luigi Cozzi, Pino Donaggio) kb
- - Conquest 1983 (Lucio Fulci, C. Simonetti) voice effects only
- - The Beyond aka - L'aldila 1983 (Lucio Fulci, F.Frizzi) Kb
- - Sotto il Vestito niente 1985 (Carlo Vanzina, P.Donaggio) Kb
- - Hotel Colonial 1986 (Cinzia Th. Torrini, P.Donaggio) Kb
- - Il caso Moro 1986 (Giuseppe Ferrara, P.Donaggio) Kb
- - Murder Rock - Dancing Death 1986 (Lucio Fulci, K.Emerson) Additional kb
- - La monaca di Monza a.k.a. - Devils of Monza 1986 (Luciano Odorisio, P.Donaggio) Kb
- - L'inchiesta a.k.a. - The Inquiry 1986 (Damiano Damiani, R.Ortolani) Kb
- - Crawlspace 1986 (David Schmoeller, P.Donaggio) Kb
- - Renegade 1987 (E.B.Clucher, M.Paoluzzi) Kb
- - Jenatsch 1987 (Daniel Schmid, P.Donaggio) Kb
- - Scirocco 1987 (Aldo Lado, P.Donaggio) Kb
- - My African Adventure 1987 (Boaz Davidson, P.Donaggio) Kb
- - Dancers 1987 (Herbert Ross, P.Donaggio) Kb
- - Sette chili in sette giorni 1987 (Luca Verdone, P.Donaggio) Kb
- - Appointment with Dead 1988 (Michael Winner, P.Donaggio) Kb
- - Phantom of Death - a.k.a. Un delitto poco comune 1987 (Ruggero Deodato, P.Donaggio) Kb
- - The Barbarians 1987 (Ruggero Deodato, P.Donaggio) Kb
- - Qualcuno in ascolto a.k.a. - High Frequency 1988 (Faliero Rosati, P.Donaggio) Kb
- - Catacombs 1988 (David Schmoeller, P.Donaggio) Kb
- - Don Camillo 1988 (Therence Hill, P.Donaggio) Kb
- - Kansas 1988 (David Stevens, P.Donaggio) Kb
- - Zelly and Me 1988 (Tina Rathborne, P.Donaggio) Kb
- - La partita 1988 (Carlo Vanzina, P.Donaggio) Kb
- - Indio 1989 (Antonio Margheriti, P.Donaggio) Kb
- - Il Portaborse 1991 (Daniele Luchetti, Dario Lucantoni) Kb
- - The Phantom of the Opera 1998 (Dario Argento, E.Morricone) composer of additional music only
- - Tophet Quorum (Profane Exhibit) 2013 (S.Stivaletti) - work in progress

=== Theatre works ===
- Macbeth (Vittorio Gassman, mus. G.Gazzola)
- Amleto (Gabriele Lavia, mus. Carnini)

== Live Music ==
- 1974 nov - dec Loy & Altomare
- 1975 sep - dec Goblin
- 1976 jan - nov Goblin
- 1978 jul - aug Francesco De Gregori
- 1979 apr - nov Riccardo Cocciante
- 1980 jul - oct Alberto Fortis
- 1981 nov - dec Luca Barbarossa
- 1982 jan - mar Luca Barbarossa
- 1982 jul - sep Riccardo Cocciante + New Perigeo
- 1984 apr - jun Patty Pravo
- 1985 jul - sep Fiorella Mannoia
- 1985 dec - dec Patty Pravo
- 1986 jan - mar Patty Pravo
- 1986 sep - oct Renato Zero
- 1987 apr - sep Mimmo Locasciulli
- 1988 jul - sep Luca Barbarossa
- 1989 may - jun Mario Castelnuovo
- 1990 nov - dec Nini Rosso, Japan
- 2007 aug - oct Goblinia (trio)
- 2008 aug - oct Orco Muto (trio)
- 2009 apr - jul Goblin
- 2010 New Goblin
- 2011 New Goblin
- 2012 New Goblin
- 2013–present Goblin
