= Suspiria (disambiguation) =

Suspiria is a 1977 Italian horror film.

Suspiria may also refer to:

- Suspiria (1977 soundtrack), the soundtrack to the 1977 film
- Suspiria (2018 film), a remake of the 1977 film
- Suspiria (2018 soundtrack), the soundtrack to the 2018 film
- Suspiria (Miranda Sex Garden album), 1993
- Suspiria (Darkwell album), 2000
- "Suspiria" (2010 song), a rock song by Rey Pila off their eponymous debut album Rey Pila (album)
- "Suspiria" (2000 song), a song from the eponymous album Suspiria (Darkwell album)
- "Suspiria" (1988 song), a flute tune by composer Jesús Rueda (composer)
- "Suspiria" (1977 song), a song from the eponymous soundtrack album Suspiria (soundtrack)
- Suspiria (band), an English gothic band from Bristol
- Suspiria de Profundis, an 1845 prose poem by English essayist Thomas De Quincey
- Suspiria, a character in Star Trek: Voyager; the female Caretaker, who appears in the episode Cold Fire
- Suspiria Mystery, a Japanese horror and mystery manga magazine

See also

- Susperia, a Norwegian thrash metal band
