= Satyricon (1969 Polidoro film) =

Italian film

- Italian theatrical release poster
- Directed by: Gian Luigi Polidoro
- Screenplay by: Rodolfo Sonego
- Based on: Satyricon by Petronius
- Produced by: Alfredo Bini
- Starring: Ugo Tognazzi; Don Backy; Franco Fabrizi; Francesco Pau; Mario Carotenuto
- Cinematography: Benito Frattari
- Edited by: Giancarlo Cappelli
- Music by: Carlo Rustichelli
- Production company: Arco Film
- Distributed by: Cineriz (Italy); United Artists (US, Europe)
- Release dates: 27 March 1969 (Italy); 17 March 1972 (Germany); 14 April 1972 (Finland)
- Running time: 120 minutes
- Country: Italy
- Language: Italian

Satyricon, also named The Degenerates, is an Italian film from 1969 directed by Gian Luigi Polidoro. Like the more famous version made by Federico Fellini, the film is loosely based on Petronius's work, Satyricon, a series of bawdy and satirical episodes written during the reign of the emperor Nero and set in imperial Rome.

== Plot ==
Encolpius and Ascyltus are two corrupt boys roaming the mean streets of Rome at the time of the empire of Nero. Both boys constantly engage in conflict with each other for the love of the young Gitone, who often prefers Ascyltus, infuriating lover Encolpius. Due to a misunderstanding, the three end up in the house of a rich freedman: the crude Trimalchio, who in his rich dinner amazes guests with exuberant courses.

Escaping from the house of the crude man, Ascyltus and Encolpius continue to fight for Gitone until Encolpius makes friends with the poet Eumolpus, while Ascyltus dies of diseases. Gitone is now only in the company of Encolpius, who cannot satisfy Gitone's amorous pleasures because of a curse hurled at him by the god Priapus, the protector of the cocks. After inheriting a rich mansion by chance by a senator named Pomponius, Encolpius, Eumolpus and Gitone go in a city where their troubles do not end because of the magic spells of a witch, soothsayer of the god Priapus.

== Cast ==
- Don Backy: Encolpio
- Franco Fabrizi: Ascilto
- Francesco Pau: Gitone
- Mario Carotenuto: Eumolpo
- Tina Aumont: Circe
- Valérie Lagrange: Trifena
- Amerigo Tot: Lica (Trifena's husband)
- Graziella Granata: Antonia
- Piero Gerlini: Abinna (Antonia's husband)
- Corrado Olmi: Seleuco
- Clara Colosimo: Seleuco's Wife
- Paola Tedesco: Criside
- Ugo Tognazzi: Trimalchione

== Content, changes, and controversy ==
The director and producer were accused of corruption and obscenity, and fined for the production.

== Rivalry over the title ==
Alfredo Bini had registered the Satyricon title in 1962. When Federico Fellini and Alberto Grimaldi started work on their film, Bini contracted Gian Luigi Polidoro to direct his own version. Grimaldi sued Bini to halt the competing film, but lost; as a result, Fellini's picture was titled Fellini Satyricon to distinguish it.

== Releases ==
To prevent the film from competing with Fellini's, United Artists reportedly bought the distribution rights to keep it off the market. However, lobby cards and posters for Italian, Belgian, Spanish, and English language screenings are known to exist, and are occasionally sold on the internet, although most of the non-Italian versions avoid the name of Satyricon and use The Degenerates (or translations of that word) instead. It has also been released on VHS by domovideo, and a cut and cropped version has been known to air on the Italian channels Iris and Mediaset Italia 1 at some time after the year 2000.

The soundtrack by Carlo Rustichelli has been released as a vinyl album in 1969 by Cinevox, and as a CD in 2010 by Saimel.
