= List of number-one hits of 1975 (Italy) =

This is a list of the number-one hits of 1975 on Italian Hit Parade Singles Chart.

Issue date	Song	Artist
January 4	"E la vita, la vita"	Cochi e Renato
January 11	"E la vita, la vita"	Cochi e Renato
January 18	"E la vita, la vita"	Cochi e Renato
January 25	"E la vita, la vita"	Cochi e Renato
February 1	"Un corpo e un'anima"	Wess & Dori Ghezzi
February 8	"Un corpo e un'anima"	Wess & Dori Ghezzi
February 15	"Un corpo e un'anima"	Wess & Dori Ghezzi
February 22	"Un corpo e un'anima"	Wess & Dori Ghezzi
March 1	"Un corpo e un'anima"	Wess & Dori Ghezzi
March 8	"Un corpo e un'anima"	Wess & Dori Ghezzi
March 15	"Un corpo e un'anima"	Wess & Dori Ghezzi
March 22	"Un corpo e un'anima"	Wess & Dori Ghezzi
March 29	"Un'altra donna"	I cugini di campagna
April 5	"You're the First, the Last, My Everything"	Barry White
April 12	"You're the First, the Last, My Everything"	Barry White
April 19	"You're the First, the Last, My Everything"	Barry White
April 26	"Piange... il telefono"	Domenico Modugno
May 3	"Piange... il telefono"	Domenico Modugno
May 10	"Piange... il telefono"	Domenico Modugno
May 17	"Piange... il telefono"	Domenico Modugno
May 24	"Piange... il telefono"	Domenico Modugno
May 31	"Piange... il telefono"	Domenico Modugno
June 7	"Piange... il telefono"	Domenico Modugno
June 14	"Parlami d'amore Mariù"	Mal
June 21	"Piange... il telefono"	Domenico Modugno
June 28	"Tornerò"	I Santo California
July 5	"Tornerò"	I Santo California
July 12	"Tornerò"	I Santo California
July 19	"Amore grande amore libero"	Il Guardiano del Faro
July 26	"Amore grande amore libero"	Il Guardiano del Faro
August 2	"Buonasera dottore"	Claudia Mori
August 9	"Buonasera dottore"	Claudia Mori
August 16	"Buonasera dottore"	Claudia Mori
August 23	"Sabato pomeriggio"	Claudio Baglioni
August 30	"Sabato pomeriggio"	Claudio Baglioni
September 6	"Sabato pomeriggio"	Claudio Baglioni
September 13	"Sabato pomeriggio"	Claudio Baglioni
September 20	"Sabato pomeriggio"	Claudio Baglioni
September 27	"Sabato pomeriggio"	Claudio Baglioni
October 4	"Sabato pomeriggio"	Claudio Baglioni
October 11	"Sabato pomeriggio"	Claudio Baglioni
October 18	"Sabato pomeriggio"	Claudio Baglioni
October 25	"Sabato pomeriggio"	Claudio Baglioni
November 1	"Sabato pomeriggio"	Claudio Baglioni
November 8	"Sabato pomeriggio"	Claudio Baglioni
November 15	"Sabato pomeriggio"	Claudio Baglioni
November 22	"Sabato pomeriggio"	Claudio Baglioni
November 29	"Profondo rosso"	Goblin
December 6	"Profondo rosso"	Goblin
December 13	"Profondo rosso"	Goblin
December 20	"Profondo rosso"	Goblin
December 27	"Profondo rosso"	Goblin

== Number-one artists ==
Position	Artist	Weeks #1
1	Claudio Baglioni	14
2	Domenico Modugno	8
3	Wess & Dori Ghezzi	8
4	Goblin	5
5	Cochi e Renato	4
6	Barry White	3
6	Claudia Mori	3
6	I Santo California	3
7	Il Guardiano del Faro	2
8	I cugini di campagna	1
8	Mal	1

== See also ==
- 1975 in music
