= Simulakrum Lab =

Simulakrum Lab 2016 Vinyl Record

Simulakrum Lab is an Italian synthwave/retrowave music project created by composer and sound designer Paolo Prevosto.

Guests who collaborated in the first album "Simulakrum Lab" (2013) were:

- Claudio Simonetti (composer, together with Goblin, of many Dario Argento’s movies soundtracks) who was keyboard player in track "Aggregat 4";
- Fabio Pignatelli (bass player, former Goblin member, known for Profondo Rosso and Suspiria soundtracks) who played bass guitar in track "Backlit";
- Kenneth Johnson (maker, producer and director of many TV series, including Visitors, Bionic Woman, The Incredible Hulk and Alien Nation) who was the voice in track "The Day The Vocoder Stood Still";
- Liz Enthusiasm (singer for the U.S.A. synth-pop band Freezepop) who performed vocals in "Quiet Girl" and "Far Worlds".

The first album was produced and arranged by Paolo Prevosto in collaboration with the Italian electronic artist Eugene, who also performed lead vocals on many of the tracks.

The music project concept uses advanced research technology with 1970s sound paradigms, inspired by electronic music pioneers such as Kraftwerk, Goblin and Moroder. The tracks are based almost exclusively on original analog synthesizers from the 70s, Moog, Korg and Doepfer, avoiding as much as possible the use of emulated computer synthesizers. The core of Simulakrum Lab is the balance between old school electronic music and groundbreaking future sound engineering.

The first album also containing two songs inspired by lost cosmonauts, titled: "Lost Cosmonauts" (a radio transmission fiction) and "Far Worlds", the lyric recounts and describes the sensations of a cosmonaut aboard his space capsule during an orbital flight.

The first work made by Simulakrum Lab was the remix of the song “Special Effects” by Freezepop in 2012. Subsequently, they released the first album titled Simulakrum Lab for the A5 label in 2013. In 2015 they made the remix of the track Killing from Demons soundtrack by Claudio Simonetti for the 30th Anniversary of the movie. In the same year the track Backlit was used for the ending titles of the French movie Mantoson Biotechnology.

In 2016 they released the Simulakrum Lab white vinyl published by Rustblade label.

In May 2017 Simulakrum Lab aka Paolo Prevosto remixed the track "Confusion" for the Dario Argento's movie "Opera" Soundtrack 30th Anniversary composed by Claudio Simonetti released by Rustblade.

The second album "Simulakrum Lab II", released on April 16, 2019, was composed, produced and arranged by Paolo Prevosto.

Guests who collaborated in the second album were:

- Cody Carpenter (musician son of the director John Carpenter) who was synths solo and piano player in the tracks "Wireframe I", "Wireframe II", "Wireframe I Reworked" and "Wireframe II Reworked";
- Dana Jean Phoenix (Canadian synthwave singer) who performed vocals in "Radical", "Here It Comes", "Radical HeartMode" and "New Constructs".

In the same year the video track “Wireframe I” was released in the “Encounter” movie Blu-Ray extras.

In February 2020 Simulakrum Lab released “Arcade Cyborg” single and in June "Ablative" single. In October released Night Fight EP featuring Cody Carpenter and Fulvio Gaslini.

In 2021 Simulakrum Lab released the single "Norris"; In the same year several tracks were used in the Italian TV docuseries "Mappe Criminali", and he participates in a tribute album to John Carpenter with the cover of Christine's soundtrack.

== Discography ==
Album

- 2019 Simulakrum Lab II (CD)
- 2016 Simulakrum Lab (LP White Vinyl)
- 2013 Simulakrum Lab (CD)

EP

- 2020 Night Fight (Digital)

Singles

- 2021 Norris (Digital)
- 2020 Ablative (Digital)
- 2020 Arcade Cyborg (Digital)
- 2019 Ad Astra (Digital)

Remixes

- 2021 Christine (Cover by Simulakrum Lab) by John Carpenter - The Way of Darkness – A Tribute to John Carpenter (CD, Album, Ltd, Num)
- 2017 Confusion (Remixed by Simulakrum Lab) by Claudio Simonetti - Opera (Original Soundtrack - 30th Anniversary Edition Limited Box) (CD, Album, Box, Ltd, Num)
- 2015 Killing (Remixed by Simulakrum Lab) by Claudio Simonetti - Demons (Original Soundtrack - 30th Anniversary Edition Limited Box) (CD, Album, Enh + CD, Comp + Box, Ltd, Num)
- 2014 Special Effects (Paolo Prevosto's Simulakrum Lab Remix) Freezepop - 15th Anniversary
- 2012 Special Effects (Paolo Prevosto's Simulakrum Lab Remix) Freezepop - Doppelganger EP
