= Francesco Pau =

Italian actor

- Born: February 1954
- Occupation: Actor
- Years active: 1968-1978

Francesco Pau (born February 1954) is an Italian actor. He is best known for his role as Giton in Satyricon (1969).

== Filmography ==
- Satyricon (1969)
- I ragazzi della Roma violenta (1976)
- A Sold Life (1976)
- Cugine mie (1978)
