= Gerardo Amato =

Italian actor (born 1948)

- Born: Gerardo Placido; 15 October 1948 (age 77); Ascoli Satriano, Foggia, Italy
- Occupation: Actor
- Relatives: Michele Placido (brother); Violante Placido (niece)

Gerardo Amato (born 15 October 1948) is an Italian actor and voice actor.

== Life and career ==
Born Gerardo Placido in Ascoli Satriano, the brother of the actor and director Michele Placido, Gerardo Amato at a young age moved to Milan where he trained as an electrical engineer. He later worked on stage, generally cast in roles of seducers, with Giorgio Strehler, Enrico Maria Salerno, and Ernesto Calindri, among others. Amato was also active in films and TV-series, but mostly in secondary roles. In 1977, he won the Grolla d'oro for best new actor thanks to his performance in A Sold Life.

== Filmography ==
- Una vita venduta (1976)
- Nina (1976)
- Difficile morire (1977)
- Blue Nude (1977)
- La notte dell'alta marea (1977)
- Eutanasia di un amore (1978)
- Io, Caligola (1979)
- Zappatore (1980)
- Passione d'amore (1981)
- Notturno con grida (1982)
- Caramelle da uno sconosciuto (1987)
- I frati rossi (1988)
- Ad un passo dall'aurora (1989)
- Io Gilda (1989)
- Ombre d'amore (1989)
- Ritorno a casa Gori (1996)
- Soft Air - Aria compressa (1998)
- Odi et amo (1998)
- Prigionieri di un incubo(2001)
- Tra due donne (2001)
- Manuale d'amore 2 - Capitoli successivi (2007)
- Il mattino ha l'oro in bocca (2007)
- Qui scorre il fiume (2008)
- Backward (2009)
- Uccidere per amare (2009)
- Vallanzasca - Gli angeli del male, (2010)
- Il sottile fascino del peccato (2010)
- Una diecimilalire (2015)
- 7 minuti (2016)
- Creed'C (2016)
