= The Red Monks =

- Original Italian release poster
- Directed by: Gianni Martucci
- Screenplay by: Pino Buricchi; Gianni Martucci
- Story by: Luciana Anna Spacca
- Produced by: Pino Buricchi
- Starring: Gerardo Amato; Lara Wendel; Malisa Longo; Chuck Valenti; Mary Maxwell
- Cinematography: Sergio Rubini
- Edited by: Vanio Amici
- Music by: Paolo Rustichelli
- Production company: Natmas Productions
- Distributed by: Chance Film
- Release date: 24 August 1989 (Italy)
- Running time: 83 minutes
- Country: Italy

The Red Monks (Italian: I frati rossi) is a 1989 Italian horror film directed by Gianni Martucci, and produced by Pino Buricchi. The screenplay was co-written by Martucci and Buricchi, based on a story by Luciana Anna Spacca. Buricchi began promoting the fact that famed Italian horror director Lucio Fulci had handled the special effects, or that Fulci had even co-directed the film. Fulci claimed he never worked on the film, and director Gianni Martucci even said that Fulci was way too ill at the time to have worked on the project with him. The film was later released to home video however with credits that still claimed that Lucio Fulci had collaborated on the film.

== Plot ==
Ramona Curtis marries Robert Garlini, and they move into Robert's ancestral mansion. Rather than spending time with his new bride, Robert vanishes for long periods of time into the creepy basement of the house, and Ramona begins wondering why he suddenly lost interest in being with her. She soon uncovers a dreadful family curse.

== Cast ==
- Lara Wendel (as Ramona)
- Gerardo Amato (as Robert Garlini)
- Malisa Longo (as Priscilla)
- Chuck Valenti (as Ben)
- Gaetano Russo (as Richard Garlini)
- Mary Maxwell
- Ludovico Della Jojo
- Claudio Pacifico
- Luca Intoppa

== Production ==
Prior to directing The Red Monks, director Gianni Martucci had a sporadic career in film, working on only 5 films between 1972 and 1988. His work predominantly followed the trends of Italian films, such as scripting the giallo film Naked Girl Killed in the Park, erotic films, crime films and slasher films such as Trhauma. His final film was The Red Monks, in which he attempted to revive the gothic film genre in Italy.

The film was aimed at foreign markets which led to its producer Pino Buricchi putting director Lucio Fulci's name in the credits initially as special effects supervisor. According to the film's script girl Anamaria Liguori, Fulci never once stepped on the set and had nothing to do with the film's special effects. Martucci commented on this, saying that Fulci had never set foot on set, but had agreed to lend his name to the film with the credit Lucio Fulci Presents, as the distributors desired a bigger name with which to market the film overseas. When asked about the film, Fulci replied that The Red Monks was a "terrible film" and that "the poster read, 'Lucio Fulci Presnets.' Presents what? The first time ever heard about The Red Monks was the day it was released on video. Believe me, when you read somebody's quote on a movie poster, think of how easy it is for a press agent to earn a living."

Shooting took place on location at Villa Giovanelli-Fogaccia in Rome. Martucci said there was some difficulty filming there as Prince Giovanelli would often wake up when they were filming and would get mad at the crew. Martucci did find the villa appropriate as Giovanelli only lived in one wing of the castle and it had a distinct fortress-like look, and the parts of the castle that were not lived in were nearly in a state of neglect which suited the film. Other locations used while filming included Forte Portuense.

During post-production on the film, Martucci was told the running time was too short for distribution, which led to him re-editing the film to include a wrap-around framing segment.

== Release ==
The Red Monks was distributed theatrically in Italy by Chance Film on 24 August 1989. It was quickly released on VHS in Italy through the Playtime label with text stating "Un film di Lucio Fulci" (transl. A Film by Lucio Fulci). Fulci threatened to sue which led to a sticker being added to each video sleeve's cover that properly credited Martucci as the director. As late as in 2015, sources still stated that Fulci contributed to the making of the film.
