= The Whale House =

Building in Freiburg im Breisgau, Germany

Coordinates: 47°59′47″N 7°51′02″E

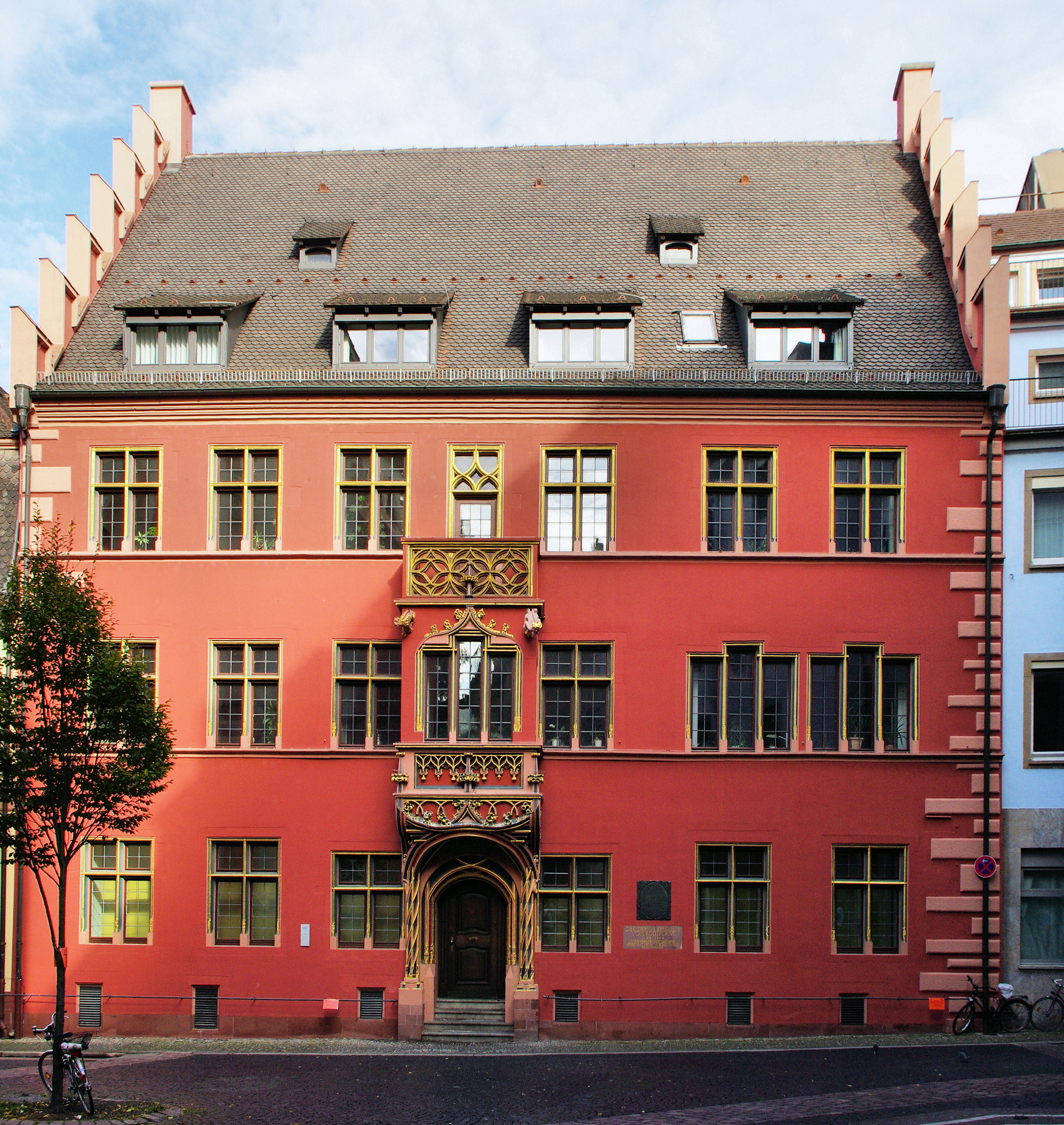
The front of the Whale House in Franziskanerstraße

The Whale House (Haus zum Walfisch) is a late Gothic bourgeois house in the old town of Freiburg im Breisgau, Baden-Württemberg, Germany and is under conservation. The building is currently used by the Sparkasse Freiburg-Nördlicher Breisgau bank. It is part of a complex which, in the past, was made up of 17 separate buildings. The front wall of the house opens onto the Franziskanerstraße, whilst the rear is on the Gauchstraße, near Kartoffelmarkt square.

The building was made internationally famous by Dario Argento's 1977 horror film Suspiria, where it appears as the Dance Academy, the film's central location.

== History ==
At the current location of the Whale House there used to be three farmsteads, 100×50 feet (ca. 30×15 m) in size: the Haus Zum Blattfuß, Haus Zum Sampson and Haus Zum Ofenhaus. Jakob Villinger von Schönenberg (1480–1529) had a house from 1506 in the Barfüßergasse (the present day Franziskanergasse). He is believed to have come from either Sélestat in Alsace or from Freiburg itself, and from 1510 he worked as Emperor Maxilimilian I’s treasurer general. After Jakob Villinger received his citizenship, he submitted a request to the city council to start the building works. Ludwig Villinger, possibly Jakob’s brother, purchased the adjacent building in 1514 and demolished it with the intention of constructing the “prestigious building”, though the city council did not grant the building permit until 1516. Only in 1517 could the Whale House, built on the spot where the original houses used to be, be inhabited. The existing continuous walls were incorporated to the new building. As Villinger had “built a noticeable house”, in the same year the city council let him expand his property further into farmsteads on the Gauchstraße to the rear of the House of the Whale, on the condition that new “domestic dwellings” were to be built in Schiffstraße. On the remaining ground, he built a “pleasure garden”. The name Haus zum Walfisch is documented in the Herrschaftsrechtsbuch (book of individual properties) from 1565, although the numbering of houses was established in Freiburg only in 1806. The Freiburg historian Peter Kalchthaler suggests there may be a connection between the name of the house and “the Story of Jonah and the Whale” in the Bible.

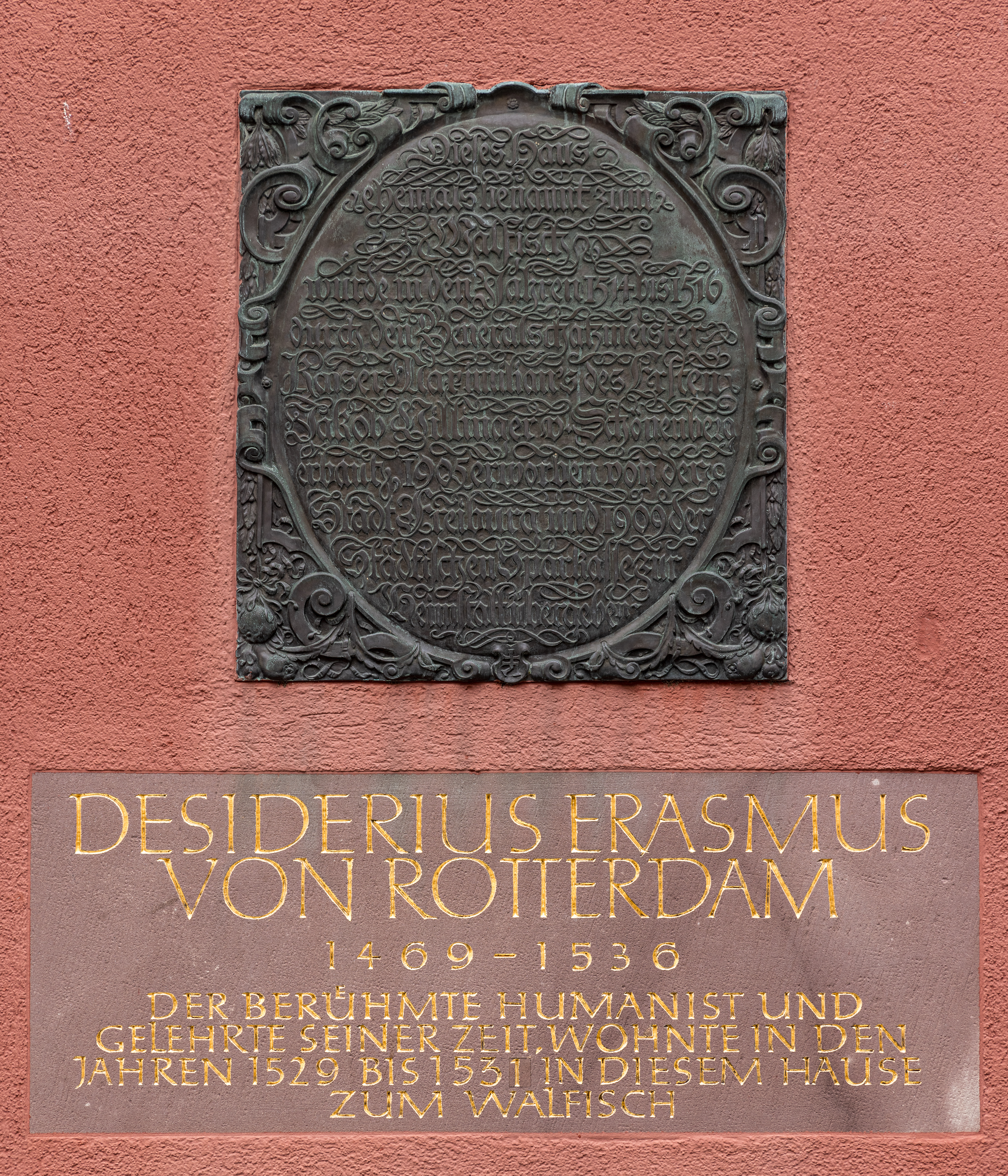
Walfisch Erasmus von Rotterdam

As recorded on the façade of the building, the humanist Erasmus of Rotterdam lived in the Villinger house after his escape from Basel. However, at the time of his arrival in Christmas 1529, the house was still unfinished.
