= A Sold Life =

- Directed by: Aldo Florio
- Written by: Aldo Florio; Bruno Di Geronimo; Fulvio Gicca Palli
- Starring: Enrico Maria Salerno; Gerardo Amato
- Cinematography: Franco Delli Colli; Riccardo Pallottini
- Music by: Ennio Morricone
- Release date: 1976
- Country: Italy
- Language: Italian

A Sold Life (Italian: Una vita venduta) is a 1976 Italian war-drama film written and directed by Aldo Florio and starring Enrico Maria Salerno and Gerardo Amato. It is loosely based on the novella L'antimonio by Leonardo Sciascia. For his performance in this film Gerardo Amato won the Grolla d'oro for best new actor.

== Cast ==
- Enrico Maria Salerno as Luigi Ventura
- Gerardo Amato as Michele Rizzuto
- Germano Longo as Major Limentani
- Sergio Gibello as Pellicioni
- Gianfranco Bullo as Coviello
- Rodolfo Bianchi as Lt. Bonelli
- Gabriele Tozzi as Major Milani
- Marino Cenna as Uras
- Toni De Leo as Vitta
- Marino Masé as Professor Marcelli
- Daniele Dublino as Federale
- Imma Piro as Miguel Atienza's Sister
- Angela Goodwin as Miguel Atienza's Mother
- Francesco Pau as Miguel Atinenza
- Andrea Aureli as Francoist Official
- Rik Battaglia

== See also ==
- List of Italian films of 1976
