= Tenebrae (soundtrack) =

Tenebre

Soundtrack album by Simonetti-Morante-Pignatelli
- Released: 1982
- Recorded: 1981
- Genre: Progressive rock; electronic
- Label: Cinevox (1982); Armadillo Music (2004 reissue)
- Producer: Simonetti-Morante-Pignatelli

Professional ratings
Review scores
Source	Rating
AllMusic	2.5/5 stars

Tenebre is the soundtrack to Dario Argento's film of the same title, first released as an album in 1982, and reissued most recently in 2006 with multiple bonus tracks. The score was composed and performed by Claudio Simonetti, Fabio Pignatelli, and Massimo Morante, three former members of the defunct rock group Goblin who briefly reunited at the request of Argento. Although the movie itself credits the score to "Simonetti-Pignatelli-Morante", the soundtrack album is credited to "Simonetti-Morante-Pignatelli".

In 2007, "Tenebre", the first track, was sampled by French electronic music duo Justice on their album Cross, in the songs "Phantom" and "Phantom Pt. II".

In April 2018, a double vinyl edition of the soundtrack was released by Waxwork Records in a limited edition.

== Track listing ==
1. "Tenebre" – 4:34
2. "Gemini" – 3:11
3. "Slow Circus" – 2:30
4. "Lesbo" – 5:17
5. "Flashing" – 6:23
6. "Tenebre" (Reprise) – 4:13
7. "Waiting Death" – 4:19
8. "Jane Mirror Theme" – 1:59
9. "Flashing" [film version] – 2:43
10. "Gemini" [film version suite] – 2:06
11. "Flashing" [intro film version] – 0:51
12. "Gemini" [alternate film version suite] – 2:57
13. "Jane Mirror Theme" [film version] – 0:39
14. "Tenebre" [alternate film version] – 0:57
15. "Slow Circus" [film version suite] – 4:55
16. "Lesbo" [film version] – 3:52
17. "Tenebre Maniac" [special effects bonus track] – 0:45
18. "Tenebre" [remix] – 5:08
19. "Flashing" [remix] – 5:32

== Personnel ==
- Claudio Simonetti – Roland Jupiter-8, organ, Roland VP-330 vocoder, Minimoog, piano, electric piano, Oberheim DMX, Roland TR-808, Roland MC4 Computer, percussion
- Fabio Pignatelli – Fretted and fretless bass guitars, percussion
- Massimo Morante – Electric and acoustic guitars, percussion
