= Il Guardiano del Faro =

Italian singer-songwriter and composer

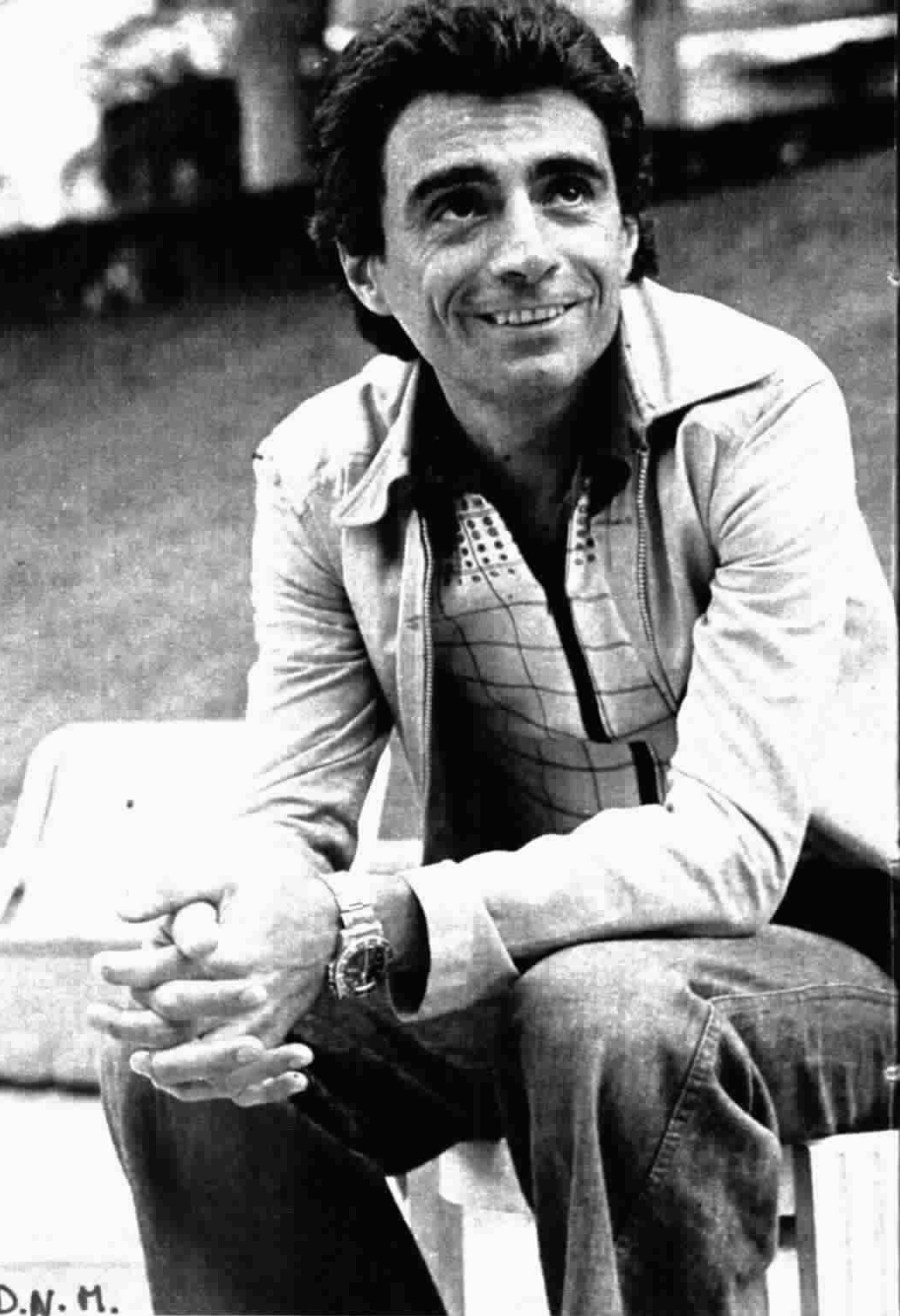
- Born: Federico Monti Arduini; 1 December 1940 (age 85); Milan, Italy

Federico Monti Arduini (born 1 December 1940), best known as Il Guardiano del Faro, is an Italian composer, producer and musician.

Born in Milan, Arduini was a child prodigy, who started studying piano at very young age and who made his first concerts aged eight years old. In 1957 he started composing songs, often being credited as Arfemo, and his collaborations included Mina, Gigliola Cinquetti, Frankie Avalon, Giorgio Gaber, Santo & Johnny and Orietta Berti. In 1967 he became general manager of Ricordi.

In the early 1970s Arduini adopted the stage name "Il Guardiano del Faro" (i.e. "The Lighthousekeeper") and was among the first musicians experimenting with the use of moog synthesizer through a series of best-selling instrumental songs. Notably, his debut single "Il gabbiano infelice" (an electronic adaption of "Amazing Grace") sold over 700,000 copies while his song "Amore grande, amore libero" won the 1975 Un disco per l'estate contest and sold over 3 million copies.

In 1976 Arduini opened a recording studio in Porto Santo Stefano, and in the later years he collaborated with several labels as an arranger.
