= Massimo Morante =

Italian guitarist (1952–2022)

Massimo Morante (6 October 1952 – 23 June 2022) was an Italian musician who was the guitar player for the Italian progressive rock band Goblin. Goblin provided soundtracks for several horror films, including Dario Argento's Deep Red (1975) and Suspiria (1977), and George A. Romero's Dawn of the Dead (1978). Morante died in June 2022, at the age of 69.

== See also ==
- Tenebrae (soundtrack)
