= Fabio Pignatelli =

Italian musician

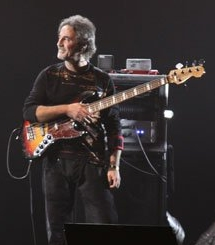
Fabio Pignatelli

Fabio Pignatelli is an Italian musician. He is the bass guitar player for the Italian progressive rock band Goblin. Goblin provided soundtracks for several horror films, most famously Dario Argento's Suspiria (1977) and George A. Romero's Dawn of the Dead (1978). The band was largely defunct by 1983, but Pignatelli kept the group together, as well as holding onto the name, and the group continued well until the end of the 1980s, with its main lineup restored briefly in 2000. Because of Pignatelli's operation of a band with the name, they were credited as Simonetti-Pignatelli-Morante for the film, Tenebrae, because the other band members (most importantly, Maurizio Guarini and Carlo Pennisi), most of whom had also worked with Simonetti and/or Morante, were not involved.

In 2013 he played bass guitar on "Backlit" track from Simulakrum Lab album, vintage synthesizers music project created by Paolo Prevosto.

== See also ==
- Tenebrae (soundtrack)
