= Claudio Simonetti =

Italian musician and film composer (born 1952)

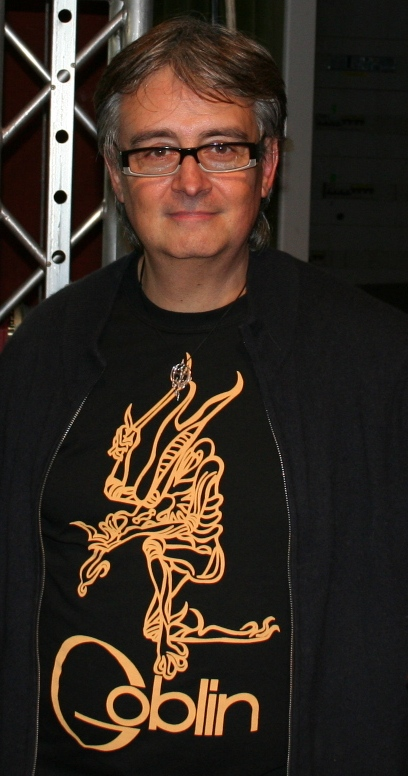

Background information
- Born: 19 February 1952 (age 74); São Paulo, Brazil
- Genres: Film score; progressive rock; heavy metal; Italo disco
- Occupations: Musician; composer
- Instruments: Keyboards; synthesizers
- Years active: 1972–present
- Label: Bella Casa
- Formerly of: Goblin; Daemonia

Claudio Simonetti (born 19 February 1952) is an Italian musician and film composer. The keyboardist of the progressive rock band Goblin, Simonetti has specialized in the scores for Italian and American horror films since the 1970s.

A long-time collaborator of director Dario Argento, Simonetti has worked on several of the director/producer's films including Deep Red, Suspiria, Dawn of the Dead, Tenebrae, Phenomena, Demoni, and Opera. His work has long been an iconic staple of Italian genre cinema, collaborating with directors like Ruggero Deodato, Umberto Lenzi, Lucio Fulci, Enzo G. Castellari, Lamberto Bava, and Sergio Martino. He studied at the Conservatorio di Santa Cecilia in Rome.

== Career ==
The son of composer and entertainer Enrico Simonetti, he was the keyboard player for the Italian progressive rock band Goblin, which initially formed under the name Cherry Five. He has been influenced by Keith Emerson, Brian Auger, Rick Wakeman and Tony Banks.

Simonetti's film work includes the scores to many popular and cult films such as Conquest (1983), The New Barbarians (1983), Cut and Run (1985), Midnight Killer (1986), Hands of Steel (1986), Body Count (1987), and The Versace Murder (1998).

Beginning in 1978, Simonetti founded a number of electronic disco projects. In 1979, with Giancarlo Meo, he formed perhaps his best-known project behind singer Vivien Vee (Viviana Andreattini), whose song "Give Me a Break" became a minor hit in the American dance charts. Later Vivien Vee tracks, particularly "Blue Disease" from 1983, showcased some of the darker and edgier sounds familiar from the Goblin years. Another project he was involved in was Easy Going, with "Baby I Love You" from 1978, and "Fear" from 1979. In 1983, he was the central member of the Italo disco group Crazy Gang.

In 1999, Simonetti formed the heavy metal band Daemonia, which has recorded updated versions of Goblin favorites in addition to original material. Daemonia has also contributed tracks to U.S. DVD releases of Italian horror movies. He composed the title track "Mater Lacrimarum" for The Mother of Tears soundtrack in 2007, which features background vocals by Dani Filth.

In 2008 Claudio Simonetti visited Kyiv with the aim of finding a unique voice that would harmonise with his music. The composer created a duet with Ukrainian countertenor Alex Luna.

In 2009, Simonetti collaborated with the Los Angeles heavy metal band Rusty Eye. He played keyboard on "Mondo Cane" and "Wings of the Demon" from the album Possessor. On 16 October 2010, Simonetti with his group Daemonia took part in the event Soundtracks – A tribute to Pino Rucher. The event was sponsored by the Municipal Authorities of San Nicandro Garganico and Manfredonia.

Also in 2010, Simonetti reunited with his former Goblin bandmates Massimo Moranti and Maurizio Guarani along with his group Daemonia's rhythm section to form New Goblin. They played several concerts around the world. This lasted until the fall of 2013 when he left New Goblin along with Daemonia's rhythm section to reform Daemonia under the new banner Simonetti's Goblin.

In 2013, he played keyboard on the "Aggregat 4" track from the Simulakrum Lab album, a vintage synthesizers music project created by Paolo Prevosto. 2015 released with the Murder Collections, new arranged version of his film themes, include Profondo Rosso, Suspiria, Tenebrae, and Dawn of the Dead.

== Solo filmography ==
- The Comoedia (1981), directed by Bruno Pischiutta
- Conquest (1983), directed by Lucio Fulci
- The New Barbarians (1983), directed by Enzo G. Castellari
- Vai Alla Grande (1983), directed by Salvatore Samperi
- Demoni (1985), directed by Lamberto Bava
- Cut and Run (1986), directed by Ruggero Deodato
- Hands of Steel (1986), directed by Sergio Martino
- Midnight Killer (1986), directed by Lamberto Bava
- Body Count (1987), directed by Ruggero Deodato
- Dial: Help (1988), directed by Ruggero Deodato
- Primal Rage (1988), directed by Vittorio Rambaldi
- The House of Witchcraft (1989), directed by Umberto Lenzi
- House of Lost Souls (1989), directed by Umberto Lenzi
- Nightmare Beach (1989), directed by Umberto Lenzi
- The Church (1989), directed by Michele Soavi
- The Washing Machine (1993), directed by Ruggero Deodato
- The Versace Murder (1998), directed by Menahem Golan
- Se lo fai sono guai (2001), directed by Michele Massimo Tarantini
- Apri gli occhi e... sogna (2002), directed by Rosario Errico
- La morte di pietra (2008), directed by Roberto Lippolis
- Frat House Massacre (2008), directed by Alex Pucci
- Symphony in Blood Red (2010), directed by Luigi Pastore
- Bloodline (2010), directed by Edo Tagliavini
- Necrophobia 3D (2013), directed by Daniel de la Vega
- Violent Shit: The Movie (2014), directed by Luigi Pastore
- The Editor (2014), directed by Adam Brooks and Matthew Kennedy
- Ballad in Blood (2016), directed by Ruggero Deodato
- Saturnalia (2025), directed by Daniel Lerch

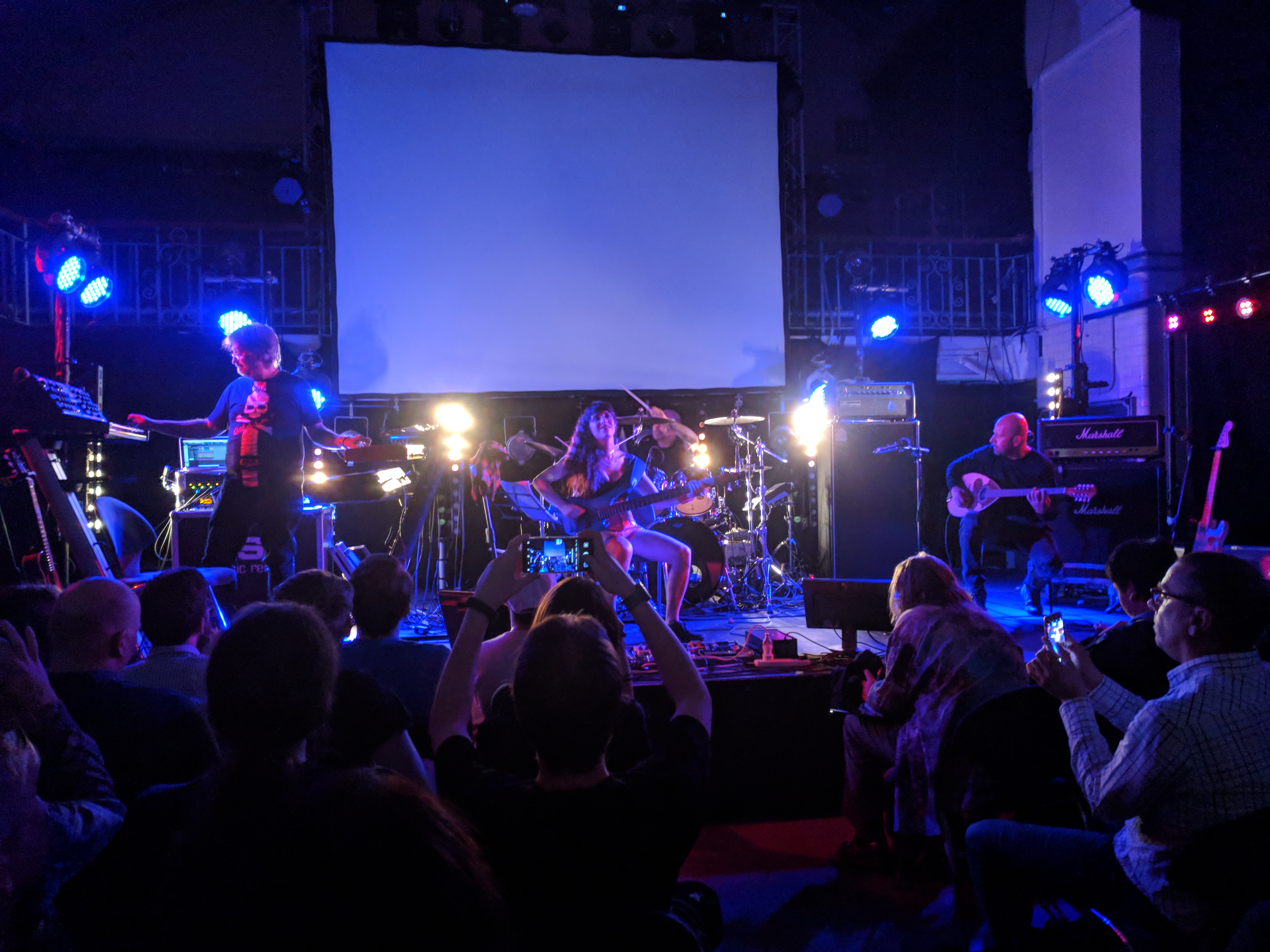
Goblin − Suspiria 2018 Edinburgh Fringe Festival

Works with Dario Argento

- Deep Red (1975)
- Suspiria (1977)
- Tenebrae (1982)
- Phenomena (1985)
- Opera (1987)
- Sleepless (2001)
- The Card Player (2004)
- Masters of Horror (2005, 2 episodes)
- The Mother of Tears (2007)
- Dracula 3D (2012)

== See also ==
- Tenebrae (soundtrack)
