= Goblin (band) =

Italian progressive rock band

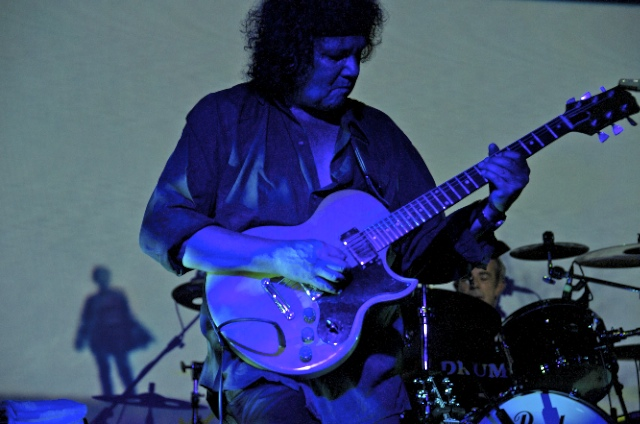
- Goblin performing at the Supersonic Festival, 2009

Background information
- Origin: Italy
- Genres: Progressive rock; film score; Italo disco
- Years active: 1972–1985; 2000; 2005–2009; 2010–present
- Members: Maurizio Guarini; Fabio Pignatelli; Agostino Marangolo; (see current incarnations)
- Past members: (see past incarnations)
- Website: goblinofficial.com

Goblin (also Goblin Legacy, Back to the Goblin, New Goblin, Goblin Rebirth, the Goblin Keys, the Goblins and Claudio Simonetti's Goblin) is an Italian progressive rock band known for their film scores. They frequently collaborate with Dario Argento, most notably creating the scores for Profondo Rosso in 1975 and Suspiria in 1977. Because their collaborator Dario Argento specializes in creating horror, suspense and slasher/giallo genre movies, scores made by Goblin in these movies often had eerie and ominous tones. CD re-releases of their scores have performed well, especially in Germany and Japan. Goblin returned with a series of live concerts in Europe in 2009 and in North America in 2013.

Initially recording as Cherry Five (they had done some live shows as Oliver), their early work spawned one eponymous progressive rock record, and they were then called in to compose the score for Profondo Rosso. The band changed their name to Goblin, rewriting most of the score, originally written by Giorgio Gaslini including the famous main theme. The 1975 soundtrack album was a huge hit. After a reshuffle in their line-up, they put out an instrumental progressive rock album Roller, before working with Argento again for 1977's Suspiria. Some tracks from the album Roller were used in the Italian version of George A. Romero's film Martin replacing those from the original soundtrack written by Donald Rubinstein. This was because at that time Goblin's music had become very popular in Italy following the successes of Profondo rosso. Other film scores and a concept album (Il Fantastico Viaggio Del Bagarozzo Mark) followed, then the score for the European version of George A. Romero's 1978 Dawn of the Dead. In both this and Suspiria's opening title sequences, they are credited as "The Goblins with Dario Argento". Tracks 1, 2 and 7 from the European version are also in the American version of the film.

Despite their success, membership continued to be a revolving door. The remaining members continued to work on further scores, and there was a partial reunification of three of the four band members for Argento's Tenebrae (1982), credited to the three band members, but not as Goblin. The last collaboration with Argento took place in 2001, with the film Sleepless.

== History ==
=== Oliver, 1972–1975 ===
Between 1972 and 1973, Claudio Simonetti (keyboards) and Massimo Morante (guitars), aided by Fabio Pignatelli (bass guitar) and Walter Martino (drums), recorded some demo tapes using the name Oliver.

On a trip to London, while looking for contacts, the band bumped into Eddy Offord, then producer of Yes. After listening to a demo tape, the tycoon producer expressed interest and asked them to move to England. By then, Fabio Pignatelli had become a steady member, and the band found a regular drummer, Carlo Bordini, and an English lead vocalist (Clive Haynes). After many months of rehearsing, they returned to London while Offord was on tour with Yes in the US; after many performances and various attempts at striking deals with record houses, they were forced to go back to Italy, due to lack of funds.

=== Cherry Five ===
Back home, they signed with Cinevox, and Clive Haynes was replaced by Tony Tartarini who had previously recorded with L'Uovo Di Colombo under the name Toni Gionta. The band's name was changed to Cherry Five by the label, and according to Claudio Simonetti for no apparent reason, as the members themselves had intended to continue as "Oliver." Whatever debate about the band's name there may have existed, their first LP was titled Cherry Five. Cinevox Records was active mainly in soundtrack publishing. Due to the band's peculiar sound, the band was frequently called to perform and arrange famous musicians' compositions. This helped them better understand the world of soundtracks and the particular techniques required. Their final act as Cherry Five was to drop new drummer Carlo Bordini and bring back Walter Martino on drums.

=== Success and film scores, 1975–1978 ===
At the beginning of 1975, the band began a cooperation with Giorgio Gaslini on the Profondo rosso film project. The band replaced Martino (who went on to join the band Libra) with Agostino Marangolo (of the band Flea on the Honey/Flea/Etna) during this period. Martino recorded on all but two cuts of Profondo rosso.

By chance, after three or four days of recording, Gaslini left the film after a conflict with Dario Argento, so Argento decided to try the band's hand at composing, giving them one night to write a score, and one day to record it. To distinguish this new release from their first LP which was just about to be marketed, the band changed their name again, this time to Goblin. Their success exceeded all expectations: more than one million copies sold, enjoying 52 weeks on the Italian hit charts and ranking first in both the singles and LP categories. It launched a highly successful period for the band, which came to an end in 1978 when the band split after the recording of Dario Argento's cut of George Romero's Zombi (also known as Dawn of the Dead). (On the score for the European version of the soundtrack, they were credited as "The Goblins.")

In 1976, they collaborated with Willy Brezza to compose the score to Perché si uccidono (the film was released in the US as "Percy is Killed", but this was a mis-translation and there is no character even called Percy in the film). For the only time, Goblin used the name Il Reale Impero Britannico due to the controversial subject matter of the movie (drug abuse and addiction). Willy Brezza wrote the original score, and the remaining tracks were written by the band together with Fabio Frizzi. The following year they scored the Italian crime film The Heroin Busters (La via della droga), directed by Enzo G. Castellari, and starring Fabio Testi and David Hemmings.

=== Fragmentation, 1978–1985 ===
Between 1978 and 1979, the band's core musicians recruited many new members consecutively. Fabio Pignatelli, Agostino Marangolo, his brother Antonio Marangolo (a saxophonist who contributed to several albums) and nephew Carlo Pennisi (a session man who often played in place of Massimo Morante when he was absent) all worked together from 1980 to 1982 in the band, Flea on the Honey, which managed to record several LPs. Pignatelli took part in all the recordings, with Agostino Marangolo ranking lead for number of performances. The remaining members continued to work on further scores, and there was a partial reunification for Argento's Tenebrae (1982) (although each member of the band was credited separately, not as Goblin). Over time, it was three of the "founding fathers" (Pignatelli, Simonetti and Morante), plus Marongolo, who became synonymous with the name Goblin.

=== Reunion for Sleepless score, 2000 ===
After 22 years of hiatus, in 2000, the group reformed to score the Dario Argento thriller Non ho sonno (Sleepless). The score was a great success and showed the group could still make great music, much to their fans' delight. The group were scheduled to perform in Tarrytown, New York for the infamous Cult-Con, but failed to appear. Simonetti did however appear at the show and informed fans that old wounds resurfaced during their brief reunion. With his horror theme tribute band, Daemonia (formed by Titta Tani, Bruno Previtali, Federico Amorosi, and Simonetti himself), he performed a nine-song set from the films of Dario Argento, and Goblin later officially disbanded.

=== Back To The Goblin, 2005–2009 ===
==== BackToTheGoblin2005 ====
Nevertheless, in 2005, with the release of Giovanni Aloisio's official Goblin biography and the opening of their official website, Morante and Pignatelli reformed the group once again and with Marangolo and Guarini recorded the album BackToTheGoblin2005 under the independent label BackToTheFudda. The album was available only through the official site and was not distributed in regular stores. It is also available on iTunes.

==== 2009 reunion tour ====
In 2009, Goblin, now Back To The Goblin, made their first live concert appearance in 32 years. Keyboardist Aidan Zammit has joined the band for their live performances. Excluding Simonetti, this is basically the "classic" line-up, with Maurizio Guarini contributing keyboard work to most of their original albums, playing on Roller, Chi?, Suspiria, Buio Omega, Patrick, Contamination, St. Helens, Notturno, Volo, BackToTheGoblin and more. The five members (Morante, Guarini, Pignatelli, Marangolo, and Aidan Zammit) performed a few concerts around Europe in 2009:

- Donaufestival in Krems, Austria on 23 April 2009
- La villette sonique in Paris - 29 May
- Dancity Festival at the Auditorium San Domenico - Foligno - 25 June
- Supersonic Festival in Birmingham, UK - 26 July
- Scala, London - 27 July

In December 2009, Back to the Goblin once again announced their dissolution due to internal conflict. The remaining scheduled concerts into 2010 were then canceled.

=== New Goblin/Goblin Rebirth and the Goblin Keys, 2010–present ===
New Goblin were scheduled to perform at Unsound Festival Kraków on 23 October 2010, consisting of Claudio Simonetti in the line-up, as well as Morante, Guarini, Bruno Previtali and Titta Tani. Essentially, it was three members of the classic lineup and two members of Simonetti's other band, Daemonia (Previtali and Tani being the bassist and drummer, respectively, of that band).

Yet another incarnation of the band, formed in December 2010 and called Goblin Rebirth, includes former Goblin members Fabio Pignatelli and Agostino Marangolo plus Giacomo Anselmi on guitars, Aidan Zammit and Danilo Cherni on keyboards.

In 2011, the monumental 450-page book, Goblin sette note in rosso (Goblin seven notes in red) was released, written by Fabio Capuzzo. It traces the full history of Goblin from 1973 to 2011 with a detailed analysis of all the albums and movies with music performed by Goblin (including all the works as session musicians). It also details full biographies, exclusive interviews and contains discographies and filmographies of the Italian composers who created scores for police, giallo and horror movies, and information about all the Italian rock bands with a role in movie soundtracks.

In 2011/2012, New Goblin (Morante, Guarini, Simonetti, Previtali and Tani) had activity around the world, including Japan (twice), Australia (twice) and New Zealand.

In April 2012, Claudio Simonetti and now-Greater Toronto based Maurizio Guarini performed with drummer Bob Scott and guitarist Chris Gartner, in Shock Stock 2012 on 14 April 2012 as The Goblin Keys. On 24 June 2013, the New Goblin line-up announced their first-ever North American tour and under their original banner, Goblin, played 17 dates in October 2013, with Secret Chiefs 3 as the opening act.

=== Tour and Simonetti's Goblin, 2013–present ===
Simonetti has since formed another incarnation of the band called Claudio Simonetti's Goblin, which features him and the other members of his horror film theme cover group Daemonia. In February 2014 they began touring and playing complete scores live during screenings of the films Deep Red, Suspiria and Dawn of the Dead. In April 2014, the band was slated to tour, performing the score to Dawn of the Dead live throughout North America, but in July the tour was canceled. In June 2014 Claudio Simonetti's Goblin released an album titled The Murder Collection, consisting of new versions of some of Goblin and Simonetti's most well-known compositions.

=== 4/5 of original Goblin members reunion, live and studio activity, 2013–present ===
Goblin returned for a second US tour leg in December 2013 with Simonetti, Bruno Previtali and Titta Tani being replaced by original members Fabio Pignatelli and Agostino Marangolo and additional keyboard player Aidan Zammit. The reunited band played 13 dates mostly in Midwest US.

In April and May 2014, Goblin returned in US for the third time. Aidan Zammit was replaced by Steve Moore of the band Zombi and Goblin played nine dates throughout the southern United States.

In October 2014, Massimo Morante, Maurizio Guarini, Fabio Pignatelli and Agostino Marangolo announced that, as Goblin, they released an album of new material titled Four of a Kind and started a crowdfunding campaign through the website pledgemusic.com to help complete it.

In June 2015, Goblin Rebirth released their self-titled debut album and did various live appearances.

Also in 2015, Cherry Five reformed with original members Carlo Bordini and Tony Tartarini along with new members Ludovico Piccinini (guitars), Gianluca De Rossi (keyboards) and Pino Sallusti (bass) and released an album titled Il Pozzo dei Giganti. On 3 April 2017. bassist Pino Sallusti died.

In early 2017, Goblin (Morante, Guarini, Pignatelli, Marangolo with Aidan Zammit) resumed live performance with three concerts in Europe: Sweden, Norway and Greece.

From 26 October 2017 through 12 November, Goblin toured North America on their 'Sound of Fear' tour with 13 dates in US and 2 in Canada.

In October 2017, the US publishing house Ajna published Fabio Capuzzo's Goblin Seven Notes in Red, the full revised and updated English version of the Italian book Goblin sette note in rosso.

In May 2018, Goblin appeared on the debut full-length Princess album with a new song called "God Save the Goblin" (Pignatelli/Wolf/Guarini/Morante/Marangolo) plus a couple of featuring (one by Fabio Pignatelli and another by Tony Tartarini).

Goblin appeared at the Psycho Las Vegas on 19 August 2018.

A Goblin album, Fearless, was released at the end of 2018.

Claudio Simonetti's Goblin actively toured Europe and North America from 2019 - 2022 with a break for COVID.

Massimo Morante died in June 2022, at the age of 69.

In 2023, Giacomo Anselmi former member of Goblin Rebirth joined Goblin on guitar, replacing Massimo.

In August 2024, due to internal conflict, both Agostino Marangolo and Fabio Pignatelli have left Goblin. Original Goblin drummer Walter Martino and "Fabio Frizzi Live" bassist Roberto Fasciani have since replaced them both. The band will now be known as Goblin Legacy.

Walter Martino died in Livorno on 7 March 2026, at the age of 72.

== Style and influences ==
Goblin has been described as "Italian prog-to-disco giallo soundtrack kings". AllMusic's review of Goblin's soundtrack for Deep Red describes the score as "an ambitious affair that blends jazz, prog rock, and heavy metal into an effective and totally distinctive style" and the track "Deep Shadows" as "a frenetic slice of King Crimson-style jazz-rock".

Influences cited by Goblin include Yes, Genesis, King Crimson, Gentle Giant and Emerson, Lake & Palmer. The band Zombi was influenced by Goblin. The band Opeth included an instrumental titled "Goblin" on their eleventh album, Pale Communion, in tribute to the band.

== Current Goblin incarnations ==
=== Claudio Simonetti's Goblin (aka Daemonia) ===
- Claudio Simonetti - keyboards
- Daniele Amador - guitars
- Cecilia Nappo - bass
- Federico Maragoni - drums

=== Goblin Legacy ===
- Maurizio Guarini - keyboards
- Roberto Fasciani - bass
- Walter Martino - drums
- Giacomo Anselmi - guitars

=== Goblin Rebirth ===
- Fabio Pignatelli - bass
- Gianluca Capitani - drums
- Aidan Zammit - keyboards
- Giacomo Anselmi - guitars
- Danilo Cherni - keyboards

=== Cherry Five ===
- Ludovico Piccinini - guitars
- Gianluca De Rossi - keyboards
- Pino Sallusti - bass (died 2017)
- Tony Tartarini - vocals
- Carlo Bordini - drums percussions

== Past Goblin incarnations ==
=== 1975 - Cherry Five ===
- Massimo Morante - guitars (died June 2022)
- Claudio Simonetti - keyboards
- Fabio Pignatelli - bass
- Tony Tartarini - vocals
- Carlo Bordini - drums percussions

=== 1975 - Reale Impero Britannico ===
- Massimo Morante - guitars (died June 2022)
- Claudio Simonetti - keyboards
- Fabio Pignatelli - bass
- Tony Tartarini - vocals
- Walter Martino - drums, percussions

=== 1975 - Profondo Rosso (Deep Red) ===
- Massimo Morante - Guitars (died June 2022)
- Claudio Simonetti - keyboards
- Fabio Pignatelli - bass
- Walter Martino - drums, percussions

=== 1975–1976 Roller and Chi? - Suspiria soundtracks ===
- Massimo Morante - guitars (died June 2022)
- Claudio Simonetti - keyboards
- Fabio Pignatelli - bass
- Agostino Marangolo - drums
- Maurizio Guarini - keyboards

=== 1977–1978 La Via Della Droga soundtrack and Il Fantastico Viaggio Del "Bagarozzo" Mark ===
- Massimo Morante - guitars, vocals (died June 2022)
- Claudio Simonetti - keyboards
- Fabio Pignatelli - bass
- Agostino Marangolo - drums, percussions

=== 1978 - Zombi/Dawn of the Dead ===
- Massimo Morante - guitars, vocals (died June 2022)
- Claudio Simonetti - keyboards
- Fabio Pignatelli - bass
- Agostino Marangolo - drums, percussions
- Antonio Marangolo - sax on "Zombi sexy" and "Oblio"
- Tino Fornai - violin on "Tirassegno"

=== 1979 - Squadra Antigangsters and Amo non-amo ===
- Claudio Simonetti - keyboards
- Fabio Pignatelli - bass, acoustic guitar
- Agostino Marangolo - drums, percussions
- Carlo Pennisi - guitars
- Antonio Marangolo - sax

=== 1979 - Patrick and Buio Omega ===
- Maurizio Guarini - keyboards
- Fabio Pignatelli - bass, acoustic guitar
- Agostino Marangolo - drums, percussions
- Carlo Pennisi - guitars
- Antonio Marangolo - sax

=== 1980 - Contamination ===
- Maurizio Guarini - keyboards
- Fabio Pignatelli - bass, acoustic guitar
- Agostino Marangolo - drums, percussions
- Roberto Puleo - guitars
- Antonio Marangolo - sax

=== 1981 - St. Helens ===
- Maurizio Guarini - keyboards
- Fabio Pignatelli - bass, guitars
- Agostino Marangolo - drums, percussions

=== 1982 - Volo ===
- Marco Rinalduzzi - guitars
- Fabio Pignatelli - bass
- Maurizio Guarini - keyboards
- Derek Wilson - drums
- Mauro Lusini - vocals
- Antonio Marangolo - saxophone

=== 1982 - Tenebre (as Simonetti/Pignatelli/Morante) ===
- Fabio Pignatelli - bass, drum programming
- Claudio Simonetti - keyboards, drum programming
- Massimo Morante - guitars (died June 2022)
- Walter Martino - percussions

=== 1983 - Il ras del quartiere ===
- Marco Rinalduzzi - guitars
- Fabio Pignatelli - bass
- Maurizio Guarini - keyboards
- Derek Wilson - drums
- Antonio Marangolo - sax

=== 1983 - Notturno ===
- Fabio Pignatelli - bass, guitars
- Maurizio Guarini - keyboards
- Walter Martino - drums
- Antonio Marangolo - sax

=== 1985 - Phenomena ===
- Fabio Pignatelli - bass, drum programming

=== 1989 - La Chiesa ===
- Fabio Pignatelli - bass, keyboards, drum programming

=== 2000 - Non Ho Sonno ===
- Massimo Morante - guitars (died June 2022)
- Fabio Pignatelli - bass
- Agostino Marangolo - drums
- Claudio Simonetti - keyboards

=== 2005–2009 - Back to the Goblin ===
- Massimo Morante - guitars (died June 2022)
- Fabio Pignatelli - bass
- Agostino Marangolo - drums
- Maurizio Guarini - keyboards
- Aidan Zammit - keyboards (joined 2009)

=== 2012 - The Goblin Keys ===
- Claudio Simonetti - keyboards
- Maurizio Guarini - keyboards
- Bob Scott - drums
- Chris Gartner - guitars

=== 2011–2013 - New Goblin ===
- Massimo Morante - guitars (died June 2022)
- Claudio Simonetti - keyboards
- Maurizio Guarini - keyboards
- Bruno Previtali - bass
- Titta Tani - drums

=== 2011–2022 - Goblin Rebirth - Goblin Rebirth ===
- Fabio Pignatelli - bass
- Gianluca Capitani - drums
- Aidan Zammit - keyboards
- Giacomo Anselmi - guitars
- Danilo Cherni - keyboards

=== 2013–2022 - Goblin - Four of a Kind ===
- Massimo Morante - guitars (died June 2022)
- Maurizio Guarini - keyboards
- Fabio Pignatelli - bass
- Agostino Marangolo - drums

with

- Aidan Zammit - keyboards (live concerts)

=== 2001–present - Claudio Simonetti's Goblin (aka Daemonia) - The Murder Collection ===
- Claudio Simonetti - keyboards
- Bruno Previtali - guitars, bass
- Titta Tani - drums
- Federico Amorosi - bass (left in July 2015)

=== 2015–present - Cherry Five - Il Pozzo dei Giganti ===
- Ludovico Piccinini - guitars
- Gianluca De Rossi - keyboards
- Pino Sallusti - bass (died 2017)
- Tony Tartarini - vocals
- Carlo Bordini - drums percussions

== Discography ==
=== Goblin ===
Year	Film	Directed by	Singles / on compilations	Latest CD / digital release
1975	Profondo Rosso film soundtrack	Dario Argento	Cinevox / MDF 070: Profondo Rosso (3:45) / Death Dies (3:37)	Cinevox / CD OST-PK 019 / 2015
1975	Gamma TV series soundtrack (with Enrico Simonetti)		Cinevox / MDF 084: Gamma (2:20) / Drug's Theme (3:43)	Bella Casa / CASA10CD / 2007
1975	Cherry Five (As Cherry Five)		The Swan Is A Murderer (Pt. 1) (4:26)	Cinevox / CD OST 703 / 2010
1976	Percy is Killed (As Il Reale Impero Britannico) (with Willy Brezza)	Mauro Macario	Edda (3:03)	Cinevox / CD OST-PK031 / 2017
1976	Chi? television theme		Cinevox / SC 1090: Chi? (3:15) / Chi? (Parte Seconda) (3:20)	Cinevox / CD OST PK 013 / 2015
1977	Suspiria film soundtrack	Dario Argento	Cinevox / MDF 107: Suspiria (5:58) / Blind Concert	Cinevox / CD OST 702/s / 2012
1977	Martin (1978 film)	George A. Romero	Wampir (1:40)	Digitmovies / CDDM283 / 2016
1977	The Heroin Busters film soundtrack	Enzo G. Castellari	La Via Della Droga (2:08)	Cinevox / CD OST-PK 015 / 2015
1978	Sette Storie Per Non Dormire		Cinevox / SC 1121: Yell (3:38) / ...E Suono Rock (4:33)	
1978	The Bloodstained Shadow film soundtrack (With Stelvio Cipriani)	Antonio Bido	Incubi Ricorrenti (Opening Titles) (2:21)	Chris' Soundtrack Corner / CSC 027 / 2018
1978	Zombi film soundtrack	George A. Romero	Seven Seas / FMS-90: L'alba Dei Morti Viventi (6:05) / Zombi (4:21)	Cinevox / CD OST 716/s / 2012
1978	Little Italy (1978 film)	Bruno Corbucci	E Lassame Perde	Beat Records / DDJ31DLX / 2023 (New recording)
1979	Together? film soundtrack	Armenia Balducci	Cinevox / MDF 121: Amo Non Amo (4:00) / Funky Top (3:45)	Cinevox / CD OST-PK 025 / 2016
1979	The Gang That Sold America film soundtrack	Bruno Corbucci	Squadra Antigangster (4:00)	Cinevox / OSTPK 046 / 2023
1979	Patrick film soundtrack	Richard Franklin	Patrick (4:21)	Cinevox / OST-PK 024 / 2016
1979	Beyond the Darkness (film) film soundtrack	Joe D'Amato	CMV Laservision: Buio Omega / Quiet Drops	Cinevox / CD MDF 631 / 2008
1980	Contamination film soundtrack	Luigi Cozzi	Connexion (3:27)	Cinevox / CD OST-PK 020 / 2016
1980	Hell of the Living Dead	Bruno Mattei		Quartet Records / QR483 / 2022
1981	St. Helens (film) film soundtrack	Ernest Pintoff	Saint Helen (Love theme) (2:08)	Digitmovies / CDDM283 / 2016
1982	Tenebre film soundtrack (as Simonetti / Pignatelli / Morante)	Dario Argento	Polydor / 813 028-7: Tenebre (4:33) / Waiting Death (4:15)	Cinevox / CD OST 713/s / 2012
1983	Spy Connection film soundtrack	Giorgio Bontempi	Notturno (4:13)	Cinevox / CD OST-PK 028 / 2017
1983	Il ras del quartiere film soundtrack	Carlo Vanzina		CAM / Digital /2026
1985	Phenomena film soundtrack	Dario Argento	Polydor / 883 188-7: Phenomena (4:24) / Jennifer's Friend (3:27)	Cinevox / CD OST 707/s / 2012
1989	The Church (1989 film) film soundtrack	Michele Soavi	La Chiesa (5:25)	Cinevox / CD MDF 329 / 2001
2001	Sleepless (2001 film) film soundtrack	Dario Argento	Non Ho Sonno	Cinevox / CD OST-PK 033 / 2017
2018	Fearless (37513 Zombie Ave.)			BackToTheFudda / BTTF-011 / 2018

=== Non-soundtrack albums (as Goblin) ===
- Roller (1976)
- Il fantastico viaggio del "bagarozzo" Mark (1978)
- Volo (1982)
- Back To The Goblin 2005 (2005)
- Four of a Kind (2015)
- Austinato: Live in Texas [live album] (2016)

=== Claudio Simonetti’s Goblin ===
- The Murder Collection CD/LP (2014)
- The Horror Box 3 LP (2015)
- Profondo Rosso / Deep Red 40th Anniversario CD / LP / Limited Box (2015)
- Bloody Anthology The Best of Claudio Simonetti & Goblin (2015)
- Profondo Rosso – 40° Anniversary (2016)
- LIVE IN JAPAN~THE BEST OF ITALIAN ROCK (2017)
- Dawn of the dead (2018)
- The Very Best Of Vol.1 (2019)
- The Devil Is Back (2019)
- Profondo Rosso (Deep Red) Soundtrack – 45 Anniversary (2020)
- The Very Best Of Vol.2 (2021)
- Suspiria: 45th Anniversary Edition - Prog Rock Version (2022)

=== New Goblin ===
- Live in Roma (2011)
- Two Concerts in Tokyo (2012)
- Tour 2013 EP (2013)

=== Goblin Rebirth ===
- Goblin Rebirth (2015)
- Alive (2016)
