= Suspiria =

1977 Italian horror film by Dario Argento

- Theatrical release poster
- Directed by: Dario Argento
- Screenplay by: Dario Argento; Daria Nicolodi
- Based on: Suspiria de Profundis by Thomas De Quincey
- Produced by: Claudio Argento
- Starring: Jessica Harper; Stefania Casini; Flavio Bucci; Miguel Bosé; Barbara Magnolfi; Susanna Javicoli; Eva Axén; Alida Valli; Joan Bennett
- Cinematography: Luciano Tovoli
- Edited by: Franco Fraticelli
- Music by: Goblin; Dario Argento
- Production company: Seda Spettacoli
- Distributed by: Produzioni Atlas Consorziate
- Release date: 1 February 1977 (Italy)
- Running time: 99 minutes
- Country: Italy
- Languages: English; Italian
- Box office: 1.43 billion lire (Italy); $1.8 million (North American rentals)

Suspiria is a 1977 Italian supernatural horror film directed by Dario Argento, who co-wrote the screenplay with Daria Nicolodi, partially based on Thomas De Quincey's 1845 essay Suspiria de Profundis. The film stars Jessica Harper as an American ballet student who transfers to a prestigious European dance academy but realizes, after a series of murders, that the school is a front for something sinister. It also features Stefania Casini, Flavio Bucci, Miguel Bosé, Alida Valli, Udo Kier, and Joan Bennett, in her final film role.

The film is the first of the trilogy Argento refers to as The Three Mothers, which also comprises Inferno (1980) and The Mother of Tears (2007). Suspiria has received a positive response from critics for its visual and stylistic flair, use of vibrant colors and its score by Argento and the progressive rock band Goblin.

Suspiria was nominated for two Saturn Awards: Best Supporting Actress for Bennett in 1978, and Best DVD Classic Film Release in 2002. It is recognized as one of the most influential films in the horror genre and has received acclaim from critics in retrospective reviews. It served as the inspiration for a 2018 film of the same title, directed by Luca Guadagnino.

== Plot ==
Suzy Bannion, a young American ballet student, arrives in Freiburg, West Germany, to study at the co-ed Tanz Akademie, a prestigious dance school. She sees another student, Pat Hingle, flee the school in terror. Suzy is refused entry to the school and forced to stay in town overnight. Pat takes refuge at a friend's apartment and tells her that something sinister happened at the school. Pat is ambushed by a shadowy figure who stabs her repeatedly before hanging her with a noose by throwing her through the apartment building's skylight. Pat's friend is also killed after being impaled by a falling shard of glass while trying to alert other tenants to the murder.

Suzy returns to the school the next morning, where she meets Miss Tanner, the head instructor, and Madame Blanc, the deputy headmistress. Tanner introduces Suzy to Pavlos, one of the school's servants. She also meets classmates Sara and Olga, her new roommate. Suzy experiences an unsettling encounter with one of the school's matrons and Blanc's nephew, Albert, before passing out during a dance class. When she regains consciousness, Suzy learns that Olga has thrown her out of her apartment, forcing her to live at the school with Sara in the room next door.

One night, maggots fall from the ceilings of the students' rooms due to a shipment of spoiled food in the attic, forcing them to sleep in one of the dance studios. During the night, a woman enters the room but is obscured by a curtain hung around the room's perimeter. Sara, frightened by her hoarse and labored breathing, recognizes her as the school's headmistress, who is supposedly out of town. The next day, the school's blind pianist, Daniel, is abruptly fired by Miss Tanner when his German Shepherd bites Albert. Daniel is stalked by an unseen force while walking through a plaza that night; his dog turns on him and viciously rips out his throat.

Sara tells Suzy that she was the one on the intercom who refused her entry the night Pat was murdered. She reveals that Pat was behaving strangely before her death and promises to show Suzy the notes that she left behind. Sara finds that Pat's notes are missing and is forced to flee when an unseen assailant enters the room. The assailant pursues her through the school before cornering her in the attic. She escapes through a small window, but falls into a pit of razor wire, entangling her before her pursuer kills her by slashing her throat.

The next morning, Tanner tells Suzy that Sara has fled the school. Suspicious, Suzy contacts Sara's friend and former psychiatrist, Frank Mandel. He reveals that the school was established in 1895 by Greek émigrée Helena Markos, an alleged witch. Suzy also consults with Professor Milius, a professor of the occult. He reveals that a coven of witches draws its strength and power from its leader, and without a leader, the coven will perish.

Suzy returns to the school to find that everyone has left to attend the Bolshoi Ballet. Recalling a conversation with Sara about footsteps, she follows the sound of them carefully, and is lead to Madame Blanc's office. Remembering that Pat uttered the words "secret" and "iris" the night that she was killed, Suzy discovers a hidden door that opens by turning a blue iris on a mural in Blanc's office. Suzy enters the corridor and finds the academy's instructors, led by Madame Blanc, plotting her demise as a human sacrifice. Albert alerts Pavlos to Suzy's presence. Suzy hides in an alcove, where she finds Sara's disfigured corpse.

Pursued by Pavlos, Suzy retreats to Helena Markos's bedroom. Suzy finds Markos sleeping, recognizing her as the headmistress by her labored breathing. She accidentally wakes her by breaking a decorative peacock. Markos renders herself invisible and taunts Suzy before reanimating Sara's mutilated corpse to murder her. When flashes of lightning inadvertently reveal Markos's silhouette, Suzy impales her through the neck with one of the peacock's broken glass quills. Markos's death causes Sara's corpse to vanish.

Suzy flees as the academy starts to explode. Tanner, Pavlos, and the rest of the coven perish without the power of Markos to sustain them. Suzy escapes into the rainy night as the school is consumed by fire.

== Cast ==
- Jessica Harper as Suzy Bannion
- Stefania Casini as Sara Simms
  - Silvia Faver as the English voice of Sara Simms
- Flavio Bucci as Daniel
- Miguel Bosé as Mark
- Barbara Magnolfi as Olga Ivanova
  - Carolyn De Fonseca as the English voice of Olga Ivanova
- Susanna Javicoli as Sonia
  - Susan Spafford as the English voice of Sonia
- Eva Axén as Patricia "Pat" Hingle
- Alida Valli as Miss Tanner
- Joan Bennett as Madame Blanc
- Margherita Horowitz as teacher
  - Louise Lambert as the English voice of the teacher
- Jacopo Mariani as Albert
- Franca Scagnetti as cook
- Renato Scarpa as Professor Verdegast
  - Ken Belton as the English voice of Professor Verdegast
- Giuseppe Transocchi as Pavlos
- Udo Kier as Dr. Frank Mandel
  - Frank von Kugelgen as the English voice of Dr. Frank Mandel
- Rudolf Schündler as Professor Milius (uncredited)
  - John Karlsen as the English voice of Professor Milius
- Giovanni Di Bernardo as police inspector (uncredited)
  - Ted Rusoff as the English voice of the police inspector
- Lela Svasta as Mater Suspiriorum/Helena Markos (uncredited)
  - Cicely Browne as the English voice of Mater Suspiriorum/Helena Markos

Director Dario Argento provides the narration in the original Italian version. In the English version, the narration is provided by Craig Hill.

== Production ==
=== Development ===
Argento based Suspiria in part on Thomas De Quincey's essay Suspiria de Profundis (1845). Critic Maitland McDonagh notes: "In Argento's reading [of the material], the three mothers generate/inhabit a cinematic world informed by Jungian archetypal imagery, each holding sway over a particular city." Argento said the idea for the film came to him after a trip through several European cities, including Lyon, Prague, and Turin. He became fascinated by the "Magic Triangle", a point where the countries of France, (at the time West) Germany, and Switzerland meet; this is where Rudolf Steiner, a controversial social reformer and occultist, founded an anthroposophic community. Commenting on witchcraft and the occult, Argento stated: "There's very little to joke about. It's something that exists." The title and general concept of "The Three Mothers"—a concept Argento would expand upon in Inferno and Mother of Tears—came from De Quincey's essay, which was an uncredited inspiration for the film. There is a section in the work entitled "Levana and Our Ladies of Sorrow". The piece asserts that just as there are three Fates and three Graces, there are three Sorrows: "Mater Lacrymarum, Our Lady of Tears", "Mater Suspiriorum, Our Lady of Sighs", and "Mater Tenebrarum, Our Lady of Darkness".

Daria Nicolodi helped Argento write the screenplay for the film, which combined the occult themes that interested Argento with fairytales that were inspiring to Nicolodi, such as Bluebeard, Pinocchio, and Alice's Adventures in Wonderland. Nicolodi also partially based her contributions to the screenplay on a personal story her grandmother had told her, in which her grandmother had gone to take a piano lesson at an unnamed academy where she believed she encountered black magic. The encounter terrified her grandmother, prompting her to flee. This story, however, was later said by Argento to have been fabricated. Using Nicolodi's core ideas, Argento helped co-write the screenplay, which he chose to set at a dance academy in Freiburg im Breisgau, near the West German borders with Switzerland and France. The lead character of Suzy Bannion was based on Snow White. Initially, the characters in the film were very young girls—around eight to ten years old—but this was altered when the film's producers were hesitant to make a film with all young actors. Additionally, the final sequence of the film was based on a dream Nicolodi had while she was staying in Los Angeles.

Argento also drew upon German Expressionism and earlier fantasy cinema when developing the film's visual style. The British Film Institute has identified films including The Cabinet of Dr. Caligari (1920) among the influences on Suspiria, noting Argento's interest in the Expressionist traditions of dreams, unreality and psychological disturbance.

=== Casting ===
American actress Jessica Harper was cast in the lead role of American ballet dancer Suzy Bannion, after attending an audition via the William Morris Agency. Argento chose Harper based on her performance in Brian De Palma's Phantom of the Paradise (1974). Upon being cast in the film, Harper watched Argento's Four Flies on Grey Velvet (1971) to better understand the director's style. Harper turned down a role in Woody Allen's Annie Hall (1977) in order to appear in the film.

Argento requested Italian actress Stefania Casini for the supporting role of Sara, a request which she obliged, having been an admirer of his films. Daria Nicolodi had originally planned on playing the role of Sara, but was unable to due to an injury, and Casini was brought in at the last minute. German actor Udo Kier was cast in the minor supporting role of Frank Mandel.

=== Filming ===
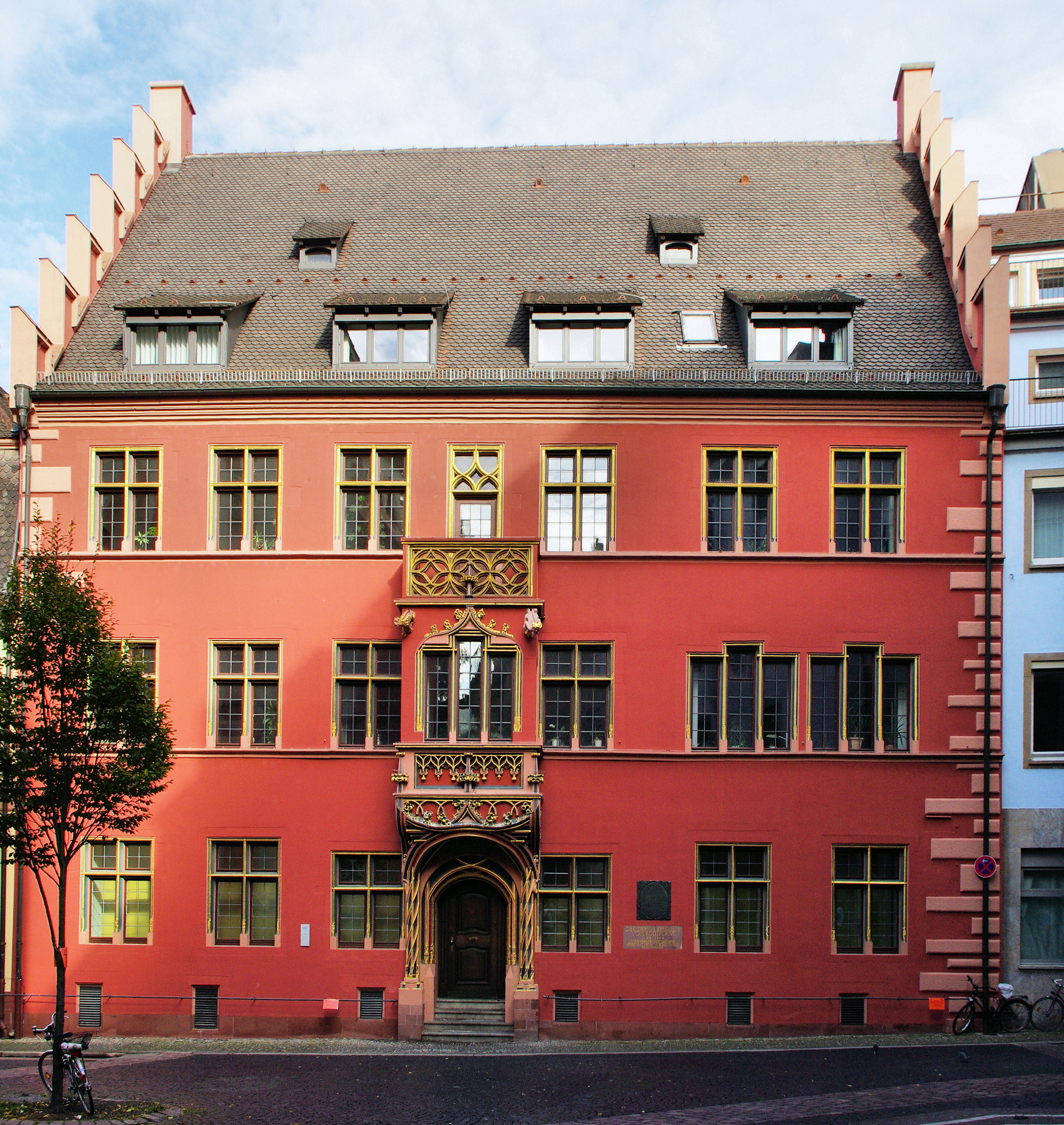
The façade of The Whale House in Freiburg was replicated for the film.

The majority of Suspiria was shot at De Paoli studios in Rome, where key exterior sets (including the façade of the academy) were constructed. Harper described the film shoot as "very, very focused", as Argento "knew exactly what he was looking for". The façade of the academy was replicated on a soundstage from the real-life Whale House in Freiburg. Additional photography took place in Munich, including Daniel's death scene in the Königsplatz square, as well as the opening scene of the film, which was shot on location at the Munich-Riem Airport (closed in 1992). The scene in which Suzy meets with Dr. Mandel was filmed outside the BMW Headquarters building in Munich.

Suspiria is noteworthy for several stylistic flourishes that have become Argento trademarks, particularly the use of set-piece structures that allow the camera to linger on pronounced visual elements. Cinematographer Luciano Tovoli was hired by Argento to shoot the film, based on color film tests he had completed, which Argento felt matched his vision, in part inspired by Snow White (1937). The film was shot using anamorphic lenses. The production design and cinematography emphasize vivid primary colors, particularly red, creating a deliberately unrealistic, nightmarish setting, emphasized by the use of imbibition Technicolor prints. Commenting on the film's lush colors, Argento said:

We were trying to reproduce the colour of Walt Disney's Snow White; it has been said from the beginning that Technicolor lacked subdued shades, [and] was without nuances—like cut-out cartoons.

The imbibition process, used for The Wizard of Oz (1939) and Gone with the Wind (1939), is much more vivid in its color rendition than emulsion-based release prints, therefore enhancing the nightmarish qualities of the film Argento intended to evoke. It was one of the final feature films to be processed in Technicolor, using the last remaining machine in Rome.

=== Post-production ===
==== Dubbing ====
Nearly all of the actors' dialogue was dubbed in post-production, a common practice in Italian filmmaking at the time. However, the scene at the academy after the first murder, where the police are investigating, features the original dialogue recorded on set.

==== Musical score ====
The Italian progressive rock band Goblin composed most of the film's score in collaboration with Argento himself. Goblin had scored Argento's earlier film Deep Red as well as several films following Suspiria. In the film's opening credits, they are referred to as "The Goblins". Like Ennio Morricone's compositions for Sergio Leone, Goblin's score for Suspiria was created before the film was shot. It has been reused in multiple Hong Kong films, including Yuen Woo-ping's martial arts film Dance of the Drunk Mantis (1979) and Tsui Hark's horror-comedy We're Going to Eat You (1980).

The main title theme was named as one of the best songs released between 1977 and 1979 in the book The Pitchfork 500: Our Guide to the Greatest Songs from Punk to the Present, compiled by music website Pitchfork. It has been sampled on the Raekwon and Ghostface Killah song "Legal Coke", from the R. A. G. U. mix tape, by RJD2 for the song "Weather People" by Cage, by Monkey Business on their song "Dirty" and by Army of the Pharaohs in their song "Swords Drawn".

== Release ==
Suspiria was released in Italy on 1 February 1977. 20th Century Fox acquired the American distribution rights; due to its violent content, they were hesitant to release Suspiria, but eventually premiered the film in July 1977 through a shell company, International Classics. The original American prints were cut by a total of eight minutes in order for the film to pass with an R-rating. Despite initial reservations, the film's American release was commercially successful, and proved to be Fox's seventh highest-grossing release of the year in theatrical rentals. Of all of Argento's films, Suspiria was his highest–grossing in the United States.

=== Critical response ===
Janet Maslin of The New York Times wrote a mixed review, saying the film had "slender charms, though they will most assuredly be lost on viewers who are squeamish." The Los Angeles Times's Kevin Thomas wrote that the film was "consistently suspenseful and diverting" despite being "marred by stilted, poorly dubbed English dialogue". John Stark of The San Francisco Examiner was critical, writing: "Suspiria is mostly gore, with little plot or intrigue." Gene Siskel of the Chicago Tribune expressed similar sentiments, criticizing Harper's character for being "reduced to cowering in corners" and "costumed to look much younger than her years"; while praising Argento's "visually stylish" direction, he felt that Suspiria was inferior to his directorial debut The Bird with the Crystal Plumage (1970) and played like a "weak imitation" of The Exorcist (1973).

Like Siskel, Bruce McCabe of The Boston Globe likened the film to The Exorcist and The Sentinel (1977), ultimately deeming it "a fitful, uneven piece of work too often more uncontrolled than the hysteria it's trying to create." Dave Kehr of the Chicago Reader gave a favorable review, claiming that "Argento works so hard for his effects—throwing around shock cuts, colored lights and peculiar camera angles—that it would be impolite not to be a little frightened". Although J. Hoberman of The Village Voice gave a positive review as well, he called it "a movie that makes sense only to the eye". Bob Keaton of the Fort Lauderdale News praised the film's "well-crafted plot", likening elements of it to the works of Edgar Allan Poe, adding: "For the seekers of superficially devilish thrills, Suspiria is just the thing." A review in the Colorado Springs Gazette deemed it "a film to experience and for lovers of cinematic suspense ... Suspiria may prove to be the most harrowing shocker ever filmed."

==== Retrospective assessment ====
In the years since its release, Suspiria has been cited by critics as a cult film. In the book European Nightmares: Horror Cinema in Europe Since 1945 (2012), the film is noted for being an "exemplar of Eurohorror ... it is excessive but here the excess seems to entail a more forceful retardation of a narrative drive, to the extent that the narrative periodically ceases to exist." Suspiria has been praised by film historians and critics for its emphasized employment of color and elaborate set-pieces; film scholar John Kenneth Muir notes that "each and every frame of Suspiria is composed with an artistic, remarkable attention to color."

The Village Voice ranked Suspiria #100 on their list of the 100 greatest films made in the 20th century. Adam Smith of Empire magazine awarded the film a perfect score of five out of five. Empire magazine also ranked Suspiria #312 on their list of the 500 greatest films ever as well as number 45 on their list 'The 100 Best Films of World Cinema'. AllMovie called it "one of the most striking assaults on the senses ever to be committed to celluloid ... this unrelenting tale of the supernatural was—and likely still is—the closest a filmmaker has come to capturing a nightmare on film." Entertainment Weekly ranked Suspiria #18 on their list of the 25 scariest films ever. A poll of critics of Total Film ranked it #3 on their list of the 50 greatest horror films ever. One of the film's sequences was ranked at #24 on Bravo's The 100 Scariest Movie Moments program. IGN ranked it #20 on their list of the 25 best horror films.

On the review aggregator Rotten Tomatoes, the film holds a 94% score based on 64 retrospectively collected reviews, with an average rating of 8.50/10. The website's critical consensus states: "The blood pours freely in Argento's classic Suspiria, a giallo horror as grandiose and glossy as it is gory." Rotten Tomatoes also ranked it #61 on their list of the top 100 horror movies. On Metacritic, the film has a weighted average score of 79 out of 100, based on 11 critics, indicating "generally favorable reviews".

=== Home media ===
Suspiria was released on DVD by Anchor Bay Entertainment in a three-disc set on 11 September 2001. This release, which was a limited edition run restricted to 60,000 units, features a THX-certified video master of the film, with a second disc consisting of a 52-minute documentary and other bonus material; the third disc is a CD consisting of the original film score. This release also includes a 28-page booklet and ten lobby card and poster reproductions. Goblin frontman Claudio Simonetti later formed the heavy-metal band Daemonia; the DVD also contains a video of the band playing a reworking of the Suspiria theme. A standard single-disc edition was released by Anchor Bay the following month.

On 19 December 2017, the independent home media distributor Synapse Films released the film for the first time on Blu-ray in the United States in a limited steelbook package. This release also consists of three discs which include a 4K restoration of the feature film, bonus materials, and the original score on a compact disc. A wide-release version not containing the soundtrack CD was released on 13 March 2018. On 19 November 2019, Synapse released its restoration on 4K Ultra HD Blu-ray without the soundtrack CD. The two-disc edition included a separate Blu-ray containing special features, but no standard Blu-ray presentation of the film.

In Japan, an HD Remastered Perfect Collection two-disc Blu-ray was released in 2016. The edition contained three different Japanese dubs: the 1979 TBS television broadcast dub, the 1986 TV Tokyo television broadcast dub and the Japanese dub produced for the 1998 DVD. The release also included interviews with Argento and a 25th-anniversary documentary. In 2019, a 4K Ultra HD Ultimate Collection was released which contained all three Japanese dubs as well as English and Italian audio. The limited edition included a 32-page booklet, a numbered message card bearing a printed Argento signature, interviews recorded in 2017 and 2019, and restoration comparisons.

In Germany, a 40th-anniversary edition was released in 2017 containing a Blu-ray, two DVDs, an 84-page booklet and a documentary about the restoration process. That same year, a 40th-anniversary 4K UHD edition was released in Italy.

In the United Kingdom, Shameless Films and CultFilms released a two-disc 4K UHD/Blu-ray collector's edition in 2026 featuring a new Dolby Vision HDR grade, commentary by Alan Jones and Kim Newman, interviews with Argento, Claudio Simonetti and other contributors, plus a book, art cards and a poster.

== Legacy ==
Suspiria has been cited as an influence by later horror filmmakers. British director Norman J. Warren stated that the film strongly influenced his approach to Terror (1978), particularly its use of unconventional coloured lighting, sound effects and dreamlike narrative logic. Warren said that seeing Suspiria was "liberating" because it demonstrated that a horror film could dispense with conventional realism and visual justification.

Director Prano Bailey-Bond cited the films of Dario Argento as an influence on the visual style of Censor (2021), whose use of vivid colour and increasingly dreamlike imagery drew upon Italian horror cinema.

== Related works ==
=== Subsequent films ===
Suspiria is the first of a trilogy of films by Argento, referred to as The Three Mothers. The trilogy centers around three witches, or "Mothers of Sorrow" who unleash evil from three locations in the world. In Suspiria, Helena Marcos is Mater Suspiriorum (lit. Latin: "Mother of Sighs") in Freiburg. Argento's 1980 film Inferno focuses on Mater Tenebrarum (lit. Latin: "Mother of Darkness"), in New York City. The final installment in the trilogy, The Mother of Tears (2007), focuses on Mater Lachrymarum (lit. Latin: "Mother of Tears") in Rome.

Film scholar L. Andrew Cooper notes "Aesthetic experience is arguably the ultimate source of 'meaning' in all of Argento's films, but Suspiria and the other films of the Three Mothers trilogy...take their emphasis on aesthetics further by self-consciously connecting their irrational worlds to nineteenth-century romanticism and the aestheticism that grew out of it."

=== Unfilmed remake ===
It was announced through MTV in 2008 that a remake of Suspiria was in production, to be directed by David Gordon Green, who directed films such as Undertow and Pineapple Express. The announcement was met with hostility by some, including Argento himself. The film was to be produced by Italian production company First Sun. In August 2008, it was reported that Natalie Portman and Annette Savitch's Handsome Charlie Films were set to produce the remake, and that Portman would play the lead role. The project was also announced to be produced by Marco Morabito and Luca Guadagnino. After a period of no news in which it was thought that the remake attempt had failed, Green said in August 2011 that he was still trying to remake the film. It was announced on 15 May 2012 that actress Isabelle Fuhrman would be cast as the lead. Later that year, however, the planned remake was put on hold. In January 2013, Green revealed that it might never happen due to legal issues. In April 2014, Green admitted the remake was too expensive to make during the "found-footage boom", and thus the film was ultimately not made.

In April 2015, an English-language television series based on the film—along with a series based on Sergio Corbucci's Django (1966)—was announced as being developed by Atlantique Productions and Cattleya. Both series were set to consist of a dozen 50-minute-long episodes, with the possibility of multiple seasons.

=== 2018 film ===
In September 2015, Italian director Luca Guadagnino announced at the 72nd Venice Film Festival that he would direct a new version of Suspiria, with the intention of using the cast of his film A Bigger Splash (Tilda Swinton, Matthias Schoenaerts, Ralph Fiennes, and Dakota Johnson). In the lead-up to filming, Johnson stated that she was undertaking ballet training to prepare. On 23 November 2015, Guadagnino revealed shooting would begin in August 2016. In October 2016, it was announced that Chloë Grace Moretz would co-star, alongside Johnson and Swinton. The film finished shooting on 10 March 2017 in Berlin. The film was described by Guadagnino as an "homage" to the 1977 film rather than a direct remake. Guadagnino's version is set in Berlin circa 1977 (the year in which Argento's film was released), with a thematic focus on "the uncompromising force of motherhood".

== Awards ==
- 1978 Nominated Saturn Award for Best Supporting Actress – Joan Bennett
- 2002 Nominated Saturn Award for Best DVD Classic Film Release
- 2018 Won Rondo Hatton Classic Horror Award in the following categories (Synapse):
  - Best DVD/Blu-ray
  - Best Restoration
  - Best DVD Commentary – David Del Valle and Derek Botelho
  - Best DVD extra – A Sigh from the Depths: 40 Years of Suspiri, directed by Daniel Griffith

== See also ==
- Gothic film § Notable films
- List of cult films
