= Cinevox =

Italian record label

Cinevox is an Italian record label specializing in the release of motion picture soundtrack albums. Founded in 1966, the label has released more than 200 titles, including numerous works by Ennio Morricone, Pino Donaggio, and various Dario Argento movie soundtracks composed by Goblin and Keith Emerson. According to their official website, the actual name of the label is Cinevox Record [sic].

== See also ==
- List of record labels
