= List of Italian films of 1982 =

A list of films produced in Italy in 1982 (see 1982 in film):

Title	Director	Cast	Genre	Notes
1990: The Bronx Warriors	Enzo G. Castellari	Vic Morrow, Christopher Connelly, Fred Williamson	Action	
Ad ovest di Paperino	Alessandro Benvenuti	Alessandro Benvenuti, Francesco Nuti	comedy	
Amici miei Atto II	Mario Monicelli	Ugo Tognazzi, Gastone Moschin, Philippe Noiret	Commedia all'italiana	
Angkor: Cambodia Express	Lek Kitiparaporn	Robert Walker Jr., Christopher George	action	
Ator, the Fighting Eagle	Joe d'Amato	Miles O'Keeffe, Sabrina Siani	—N/a	
Attila flagello di Dio	Castellano & Pipolo	Diego Abatantuono, Rita Rusic	comedy	
Banana Joe	Steno	Bud Spencer, Giorgio Bracardi	action-comedy	
Beyond the Door	Liliana Cavani	Marcello Mastroianni, Eleonora Giorgi, Tom Berenger	drama	
Bingo Bongo	Pasquale Festa Campanile	Adriano Celentano, Carole Bouquet	comedy	
Blow to the Heart	Gianni Amelio	Jean-Louis Trintignant	drama	
Blue Island (Due gocce d'acqua salata)	Enzo Doria, Luigi Russo	Sabrina Siani	adventure	
Bomber	Michele Lupo	Bud Spencer, Jerry Calà	action-comedy	
Il buon soldato	Franco Brusati	Mariangela Melato	drama	
I camionisti	Flavio Mogherini	Gigi e Andrea, Daniela Poggi	comedy	
La casa stregata	Bruno Corbucci	Renato Pozzetto, Gloria Guida	comedy	
Cavalleria rusticana	Franco Zeffirelli	Yelena Obraztsova	Opera	
Le Cadeau	Michel Lang	Pierre Mondy, Claudia Cardinale	comedy	
Cercasi Gesù	Luigi Comencini	Beppe Grillo, Maria Schneider, Fernando Rey	Comedy-drama	
Cicciabomba	Umberto Lenzi	Donatella Rettore, Anita Ekberg	comedy	
Count Tacchia	Sergio Corbucci	Enrico Montesano, Vittorio Gassman	historical comedy	
Daughter of the Jungle	Umberto Lenzi	Sabrina Siani	adventure	
Delitto sull'autostrada	Bruno Corbucci	Tomas Milian, Viola Valentino	Poliziottesco-Comedy	
Diamond Connection	Sergio Bergonzelli	William Berger, Barbara Bouchet	Crime	
Dio li fa e poi li accoppia	Steno	Johnny Dorelli, Marina Suma, Lino Banfi	comedy	
Di padre in figlio	Vittorio Gassman	Vittorio Gassman, Alessandro Gassman	comedy-drama	
Don't Play with Tigers	Bruno Corbucci	Edwige Fenech, Renato Pozzetto, Lino Banfi, Pippo Franco, Janet Agren	comedy	
Eccezzziunale... veramente	Carlo Vanzina	Diego Abatantuono, Stefania Sandrelli	comedy	
Ehrengard	Emidio Greco	Jean Pierre Cassel, Lea Padovani	drama	
Blood Link	Alberto De Martino	Michael Moriarty, Penelope Milford, Geraldine Fitzgerald	Giallo-Horror	
Giocare d'azzardo	Cinzia Th. Torrini	Piera Degli Esposti, Renzo Montagnani	drama	
Giovani, belle... probabilmente ricche	Michele Massimo Tarantini	Carmen Russo, Nadia Cassini	Commedia sexy all'italiana	
The Girl from Trieste	Pasquale Festa Campanile	Ben Gazzara, Ornella Muti, Mimsy Farmer	romance-drama	
La gorilla	Romolo Guerrieri	Lory Del Santo, Gianfranco D'Angelo	comedy	
Grand Hotel Excelsior	Castellano & Pipolo	Adriano Celentano, Enrico Montesano, Carlo Verdone	comedy	
Grog	Francesco Laudadio	Franco Nero, Sandra Milo, Gabriele Ferzetti, Claudio Cassinelli	comedy	
Grunt!	Andy Luotto	Andy Luotto, Gianni Ciardo, Giorgio Faletti, Roberto Della Casa	slapstick comedy-fantasy	Best known for featuring in the 1990 film, Troll 2
Heads I Win, Tails You Lose	Nanni Loy	Nino Manfredi, Renato Pozzetto, Paolo Stoppa	Commedia all'italiana	
Hunters of the Golden Cobra	Antonio Margheriti	David Warbeck	adventure	
I Know That You Know That I Know	Alberto Sordi	Alberto Sordi, Monica Vitti	Commedia all'italiana	
An Ideal Adventure	Stefano Vanzina	Edwige Fenech, Diego Abatantuono, Liù Bosisio	Comedy	
Identification of a Woman (Identificazione di una donna)	Michelangelo Antonioni	Tomas Milian, Daniela Silverio	Drama	
I'm Going to Live by Myself	Marco Risi	Jerry Calà, Lando Buzzanca	comedy	
Invito al viaggio	Ettore Scola	Laurent Malet, Aurore Clément, Mario Adorf	fantasy-drama	
Journey with Papa	Peter Del Monte	Alberto Sordi, Carlo Verdone	Comedy	
Madonna che silenzio c'è stasera	Maurizio Ponzi	Francesco Nuti	comedy	
Malamore	Eriprando Visconti	Nathalie Nell	melodrama	
Manhattan Baby	Lucio Fulci	Christopher Connelly, Brigitta Boccoli	horror	
Nana, the True Key of Pleasure	Dan Wolman	Jean-Pierre Aumont, Katya Berger	drama	
The New York Ripper	Lucio Fulci	Jack Hedley	giallo	
The Night of the Shooting Stars (La Notte di San Lorenzo)	Paolo Taviani, Vittorio Taviani	Omero Antonutti, Margarita Lozano	Fantasy	
No Thanks, Coffee Makes Me Nervous	Lodovico Gasparini	Lello Arena, Massimo Troisi	Giallo-Comedy	
Notturno con grida	Vittorio Salerno, Ernesto Gastaldi	Maria Chianetta, Gerardo Amato, Luciano Pigozzi	—N/a	
The Eyes, the Mouth	Marco Bellocchio	Lou Castel, Ángela Molina, Emmanuelle Riva	drama	
Pagliacci	Franco Zeffirelli	Teresa Stratas, Plácido Domingo	Opera	
Panic (Bakterion)	Tonino Ricci	David Warbeck, Janet Ågren	horror	
Il paramedico	Sergio Nasca	Enrico Montesano, Edwige Fenech	Comedy	
Pierino colpisce ancora	Marino Girolami	Alvaro Vitali, Michela Miti	comedy	
Più bello di così si muore	Pasquale Festa Campanile	Enrico Montesano, Ida Di Benedetto, Monica Guerritore	Comedy	
The Pool Hustlers	Maurizio Ponzi	Francesco Nuti, Giuliana De Sio	comedy-drama	
Porca vacca	Pasquale Festa Campanile	Renato Pozzetto, Laura Antonelli, Aldo Maccione	war-comedy	
Red Bells	Sergei Bondarchuk	Franco Nero, Ursula Andress	comedy	
Rome from the Window	Masuo Ikeda	Claudio Cassinelli, Delia Boccardo	Mystery	Italian-Japanese co-production
Sballato, gasato, completamente fuso	Steno	Edwige Fenech, Diego Abatantuono	comedy	
The Scorpion with Two Tails	Sergio Martino	John Saxon, Van Johnson	—N/a	
Scusa se è poco	Marco Vicario	Monica Vitti, Ugo Tognazzi, Diego Abatantuono	comedy	
Sciopèn	Luciano Odorisio	Michele Placido, Giuliana De Sio, Adalberto Maria Merli	Comedy	
She	Avi Nesher	Sandahl Bergman	post apocalyptic	
Sesso e volentieri	Dino Risi	Johnny Dorelli, Laura Antonelli, Gloria Guida	anthology-comedy	
Sogni mostruosamente proibiti	Neri Parenti	Paolo Villaggio, Janet Agren, Alida Valli	Comedy	
Spaghetti House	Giulio Paradisi	Nino Manfredi, Rita Tushingham	Commedia all'italiana	
Sturmtruppen 2	Salvatore Samperi	Massimo Boldi, Teo Teocoli, Alida Valli	Comedy	
The Sword of the Barbarians	Michele Massimo Tarantini	Peter McCoy, Sabrina Siani	fantasy-action	
Talcum Powder (Borotalco)	Carlo Verdone	Carlo Verdone, Eleonora Giorgi, Christian De Sica	comedy	
Tenebrae	Dario Argento	Anthony Franciosa, John Saxon, Daria Nicolodi, Giuliano Gemma	Giallo	
That Night in Varennes (Il mondo nuovo)	Ettore Scola	Jean-Louis Barrault, Marcello Mastroianni	Period drama	
Tiger Joe	Antonio Margheriti	David Warbeck, Annie Belle	adventure	
Tomorrow We Dance	Maurizio Nichetti	Maurizio Nichetti, Mariangela Melato, Paolo Stoppa	comedy	
Vai avanti tu che mi vien da ridere	Giorgio Capitani	Lino Banfi, Agostina Belli	crime-comedy	
Vatican Conspiracy	Marcello Aliprandi	Terence Stamp, Fabrizio Bentivoglio, Gabriele Ferzetti	thriller	
Via degli specchi	Giovanna Gagliardo	Nicole Garcia, Milva, Heinz Bennent	drama	
Vieni avanti cretino	Luciano Salce	Lino Banfi, Gigi Reder, Michela Miti	comedy	
Violence in a Women's Prison	Bruno Mattei	Laura Gemser, Gabriele Tinti	Women in prison	
Viuuulentemente mia	Carlo Vanzina	Laura Antonelli, Diego Abatantuono	comedy	
W la foca	Nando Cicero	Lory Del Santo, Michela Miti, Bombolo	comedy	
