= Sabrina Siani =

Italian actress (born 1963)

- Born: Sabrina Seggiani; August 13, 1963 (age 62); Rome, Lazio, Italy
- Other names: Sabrina Sellers, Sabrina Syan
- Occupation: Actress
- Years active: 1979-1989

Sabrina Siani (born Sabrina Seggiani in Rome, 1963) is an Italian film actress. She also used pseudonyms such as Sabrina Sellers and Sabrina Syan. She starred in numerous films, mostly violent cannibal films and sexy barbarian "sword-and-sandal" movies, and most of her films were made in a three-year period between the ages of 17 and 20. Siani retired from acting entirely in 1989, at age 26.

Her brief career included working with some of the most famous Italian horror film directors of the time, including Lucio Fulci, Umberto Lenzi, Antonio Margheriti, Joe D'Amato, Jesús Franco and Alfonso Brescia.

== Selected filmography ==
- Napoli... la camorra sfida, la città risponde (1979), Mafia film directed by Alfonso Brescia
- La liceale al mare con l'amica di papà (1980) aka High School Girl at the Beach with Dad's Friend
- Mondo Cannibale (1980), a.k.a. White Cannibal Queen, a.k.a. The Cannibals, directed by Jesús Franco
- Cannibal Terror (1981), co-written by Jesús Franco; used a lot of stock footage from Mondo Cannibale.
- Pierino medico della Saub (1981), directed by Giuliano Carnimeo
- 2020 Texas Gladiators (1982) a.k.a. Anno 2020 - I gladiatori del futuro, directed by Joe D'Amato
- Daughter of the Jungle (1982), a.k.a. Incontro nell'ultimo paradiso/ Encounter in the Last Paradise, directed by Umberto Lenzi
- The Invincible Barbarian (1982), a.k.a. Gunan the Warrior, a.k.a. Gunan il guerriero, a.k.a. Gunan, King of the Barbarians; directed by Franco Prosperi
- Ator l'invincibile / Ator the Invincible (1982), a.k.a. Ator the Fighting Eagle, directed by Joe D'Amato
- The Sword of the Barbarians (1982), a.k.a. Barbarian Master, a.k.a. Sangraal, the Sword of Fire, directed by Michele Tarantini
- Blue Island (1982) a.k.a. Due gocce d'acqua salata, scripted by Dardano Sacchetti
- Hunters of the Golden Cobra (1982), directed by Antonio Margheriti
- The Throne of Fire (1983) directed by Franco Prosperi
- Conquest (1983) a.k.a. Conquest of the Lost Land, directed by Lucio Fulci
- Black Cobra (1984), directed by Umberto Lenzi, starring Fred Williamson
- Good King Dagobert (1984), directed by Dino Risi
- Aenigma (1987, uncredited cameo), directed by Lucio Fulci
- Ten Zan: Ultimate Mission (1988)
