= Daughter of the Jungle =

Daughter of the Jungle may refer to:

- Daughter of the Jungle (1949 film), an American adventure film
- Daughter of the Jungle (1982 film), an Italian romantic adventure film
