= The Lady (web series) =

- Genre: Soap opera
- Written by: Lory Del Santo
- Directed by: Lory Del Santo
- Starring: Gloria Contreras: Lona / Lady; Natalia Bush: Giselle; Costantino Vitagliano: Luc; Guendalina Canessa: Guenda; Kateryna Tarkova: Doris; Francesco Allegra: Manuel; Roberto Perna: Roberto; Chanaka Hapugoda: Chang; Andrea Bellisario: Andrey; Eugenya Kuzmenko: Eugenya; Alexander Suriel: Ale; Gianny Mauriello: Gianny; Riccardo Messina: spia per Lady; Joy Corrigan: Joy; Aline Domingos: Ali; Alejandro Hidalgo: Alejandro; Anthony Lordi: Anthony; Antonio Galofaro: Antonio; Yuri Attili: Yuri; Nancy Bernacchia: Nancy; Amanda Panezo: Amanda; Simone Anedda: Simone; Mario Fiore: Mario; Olga De Mar: Zora; Sarah Altobello: Sarah; Fabrizio Gallucci: Body; Maccio Capatonda: Mio
- Country of origin: Italy
- Original language: Italian
- No. of seasons: 3
- No. of episodes: 37

Production
- Running time: 12–14 minutes

Original release
- Network: YouTube
- Release: 8 October 2014 – 17 April 2017

The Lady is an Italian mystery web series created by Lory Del Santo, starring Gloria Contreras, Natalia Bush and Costantino Vitagliano, produced from 2014 to 2017. Composed of webisodes published on YouTube, lasting between 12 and 14 minutes, the work is entirely written, directed, produced, edited and photographed by Lory Del Santo.

== Plot ==
=== Season 1: L'amore sconosciuto ===
Lona, a young advertising entrepreneur with a turbulent and mysterious past, is struggling with her emotions and a troubled relationship with Luc. She lives in Milan, where she owns a building overlooking the city.

Lona is represented throughout the series as a very attentive and practical person who knows the world in which she operates very well and does not allow herself to be manipulated. She travels a lot for work, Capri, Paris, London, even if she is shown practically working on a photographic set only in the Campania region. The love story she experiences with Luc torments her because of her fear of losing her freedom, and she therefore remains in contact with various men throughout the episodes, but without ever cheating. This attitude is explained as "a game". The screenplay doesn't say much about her past, an insight based on gossip is offered only in a dialogue between the personal trainer and a frequenter of Lona's gym, who explains how the Lady's family of origin was poor, but following a marriage to a very rich man she became emancipated. The man appears to have died under mysterious circumstances.

Among the various subplot, the main one centers on espionage and counter-espionage activity in Miami, where the Lady apparently has an important deposit. This location and also some dialogues quoting characters from the show show the international nature of Lona's fame and power.

Various figures and characters move around Lona and enrich the story with many subplots. Important to mention are the secretary Doris and the handyman butlers Samir and Chang, very positive characters, contrasted by Lona's nephew, Doris' boyfriend and many other idlers who abuse Lona's generosity.

=== Season 2: L'odio passionale ===
A conspiracy seems to be moving against Lona: her friend Manuel drugs her cocktail at a party and takes advantage of her faintness to steal the contents of her precious handbag; the mysterious Zora, leader of the "Black Angels", vows revenge against Lady. Despite the crises, Lona (single, after separating from Luc) continues her work.

The contrast between Zora's philosophy based on the total and visceral hatred that she feels for Lona and the increasingly introspective reflections on the meaning of love that The Lady offers us is the diptych on which the entire series is based.

=== Season 3: La perfidia patinata ===
Lady wants to tell her story. Giselle returns to the scene. New characters burst in asserting their own selves. Zora doesn't stop, she wants to go all the way and the Black Angels are always by her side, but friction arises within the group. Lona's secretary is replaced and the viewer realizes that the new arrival is a puppet sent to ruin the Lady.

The series ends with Lona making a metaphorical ascent from the edge of the sea to an observatory in the Alps, with a soliloquy from the Lady, with the aria of Carmen, regarding personal revenge, universal feelings and the value of art.

== Webisodes ==
Seasom	Webisodes	Original release
Season 1	10	2014
Season 2	12	2015-2016
Season 3	15	2017

== Production ==
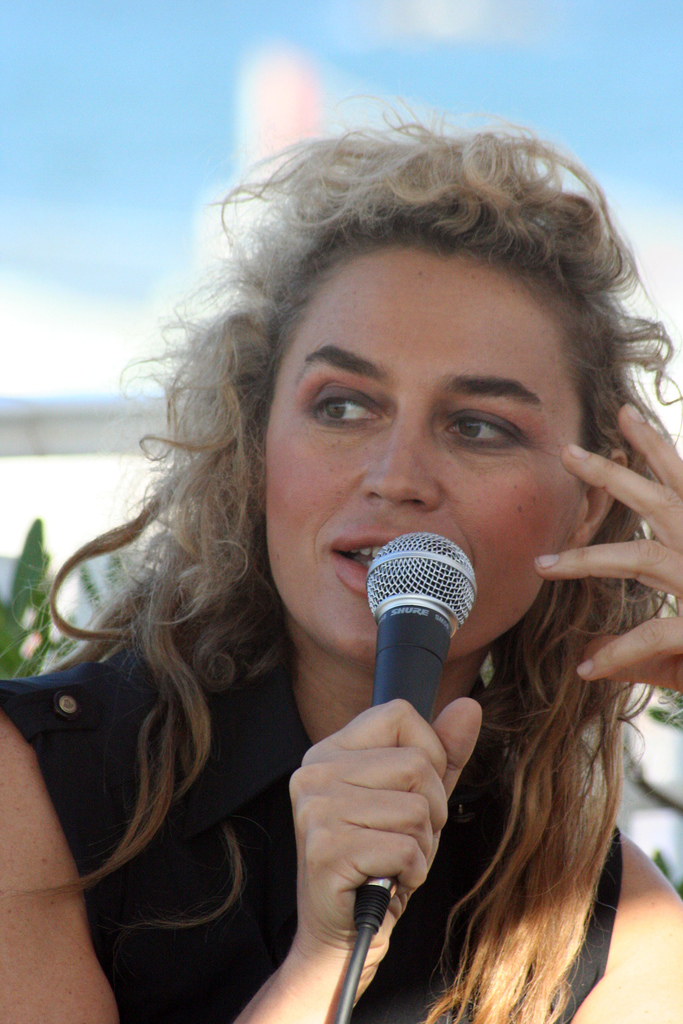
Lory Del Santo

Initially the web series was conceived by its creator Lory Del Santo as the second short film of a possible trilogy; the first, also distributed via the YouTube channel of the former showgirl April 2013, and similarly titled with a double English-Italian title, The Night Club - Osare per credere, which featured Gloria Contreras and Aída Yéspica. Subsequently, the duration of this second work reached that of a typical feature film, thus leading to the decision to be divided into webisodes of around ten minutes each, to be released on a weekly basis. The scenes of the first season were shot in two weeks in various locations, both Italian (Milan, Rome, Capri) and abroad (London, Paris, Miami), and the entire project was financed by Del Santo herself.

The provisional title of the web series was The Lady - L'amore questo sconosciuto, as Del Santo's press releases prior to publication attested.

== Reception ==
Following a successful ironic review on the Italian edition of Vice by Niccolò Carradori, views of the web series increased dramatically. The technical incompetence, the almost complete lack of plot, the amateurism of the performers and the disorganicity that pervades the entire production immediately consecrated it as a masterpiece of trash culture and the surreal. Several commentators have jokingly compared The Lady to a film by David Lynch, for the absurdity of the situations and the incoherence of the dialogues, which involuntarily lead to total nonsense.

The Italian edition of Wired, in an article signed by the film critic Gabriele Niola, defined it as "a pure trash masterpiece", believing that with this web series Del Santo gave life to the "compulsive-chi' genre, with protagonists were "badly dressed men but very fit and tattooed" and women with "unthinkable physiques" who "express their internal monologues out loud and justify cosmetic surgery as a massage". Again, Niola, this time on Punto Informatico, points out how the product, which has obtained a good response in terms of views, is not aimed so much at the typical audience of successful Italian web series, but rather at viewers more comparable to the traditional television audience, which until then had been little involved in productions for the network. The column written by actress Francesca Petretto on Il Fatto Quotidiano criticizes the work, which seems to have been involuntarily created «to explain easily and with chilling precision the concept of trash», considering both the acting skills of the actors and actresses present and the technical side (including incorrect shots and dubbing out of sync) to be poor, while inviting readers to see it as a «truly enlightening experience». Il Secolo XIX highlighted how it was precisely the defects of the web series and its "grotesque ingredients" of the plot that made it successful, making it "such a trash product that it creates addiction" and therefore capable of becoming "an eagerly awaited event for Internet users".

On 8 December 2014, a preview of the tenth and last episode of the first season of The Lady was broadcast on Rai 2's program Quanto manca, in which some members of the cast were also invited and interviewed. The growing notoriety of the web series, albeit due to negative reviews, meant that it was also parodied by another Rai 2 program, Quelli che il calcio, which dedicated a sketch of the imitator Lucia Ocone.

On 28 May 2017, Del Santo received the "Web Award" for directing The Lady at the Intercommunal Amateur Film Festival of Brescia.
