= Martufello =

Italian actor and comedian

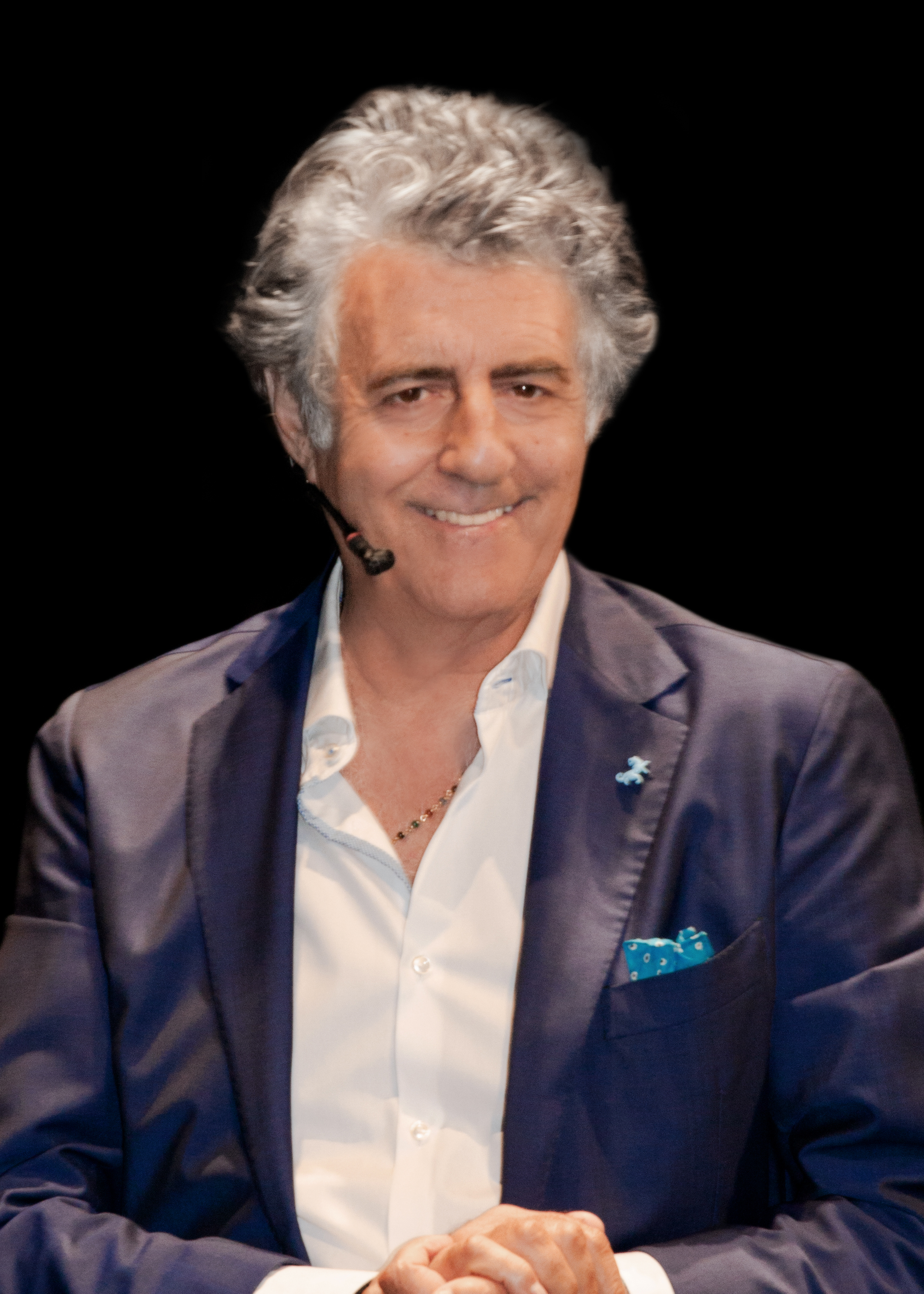
- Fabrizio Maturani (Martufello), (2017)
- Born: Fabrizio Maturani; 21 December 1951 (age 74); Sezze, Latina, Lazio, Italy
- Occupation: Actor
- Years active: 1979–present
- Height: 1.83 m (6 ft 0 in)

Fabrizio Maturani, known as Martufello (Sezze, 21 December 1951), is an Italian comedian, cabaret artist, humorist and actor.

== Biography ==
He began his career as a comedian and cabaret artist in village festivals and in the local province of Latina. During one of his shows in Latina, he is noticed by a manager who, in turn, signals him to Pier Francesco Pingitore. Towards the end of the seventies, he was called as a helper joke in his theater company "Il Bagaglino".

Martufello subsequently links his career to Bagaglino, becoming over time one of the most representative members of the theatrical, television and film shows staged by the group, until 2011 (year of dissolution of the company). Along the eighties, also acts in small parts in some films of Steno (Il tango della gelosia, Bonnie and Clyde Italian Style and An Ideal Adventure), in the censored W la foca by Nando Cicero and in the second and last film directed by Renzo Arbore "FF.SS." – Cioè: "...che mi hai portato a fare sopra a Posillipo se non mi vuoi più bene?".

In 1995 he wrote a book of jokes entitled Di più, nin zo', in which he reproposes his sketches based on the figure of the burino (as he defines himself); in the same year he is the protagonist of the film Chiavi in Mano by Mariano Laurenti, unfortunate remake of Ubalda, All Naked and Warm, in the role of Baccello da Sarnano. Since September 2014 he is part of the cast of Avanti un altro! on Canale 5, in the role of joke teller.

== Personal life ==
Martufello has married twice; he considers himself Roman Catholic.

On 25 July 2015, he is the victim of a car accident in Vetralla, reporting the fracture of the nasal septum and various other contusions to the head and legs.

== Career ==
=== Television ===
- Biberon (1987–1990) – Rai 1
- Cocco (1988–1989) – Rai 2
- Stasera mi butto (1990) – Rai 2
- Crème Caramel (1991) – Rai 1
- Saluti e baci (1993) – Rai 1
- Bucce di banana (1994) – Rai 1
- Beato tra le donne (1994–1997) – Rai 1, Canale 5
- Champagne! (1995) – Canale 5
- Rose Rosse (1996) – Canale 5
- Viva l'Italia! e Viva le italiane! (1997) – Canale 5
- Gran Caffè (1998) – Canale 5
- La Canzone del Secolo (1999) – Canale 5
- BuFFFoni (2000) – Canale 5
- Saloon (2001) – Canale 5
- Marameo (2002) – Canale 5
- Miconsenta (2003) – Canale 5
- Barbecue (2004) – Canale 5
- Tele fai da te (2005) – Canale 5
- Torte in faccia (2006) – Canale 5
- E io... pago! (2007) – Canale 5
- Zona Martufello (2007) – Teleuniverso
- Gabbia di matti (2008) – Canale 5
- Bellissima-Cabaret Anticrisi (2009) – Canale 5
- Avanti un altro! (2014) – Canale 5
- Magnamose tutto! (2017) – Canale 5
- Soliti ignoti (2020) – Rai 1

=== Theater ===
- 50 sfumature di Renzi, scripted and directed by Pier Francesco Pingitore (2015)
- L'imbianchino, scripted by Donald Churchill (2019)
- La Presidente – Valeria Marini eletta al Quirinale, scripted and directed by Pier Francesco Pingitore (2019–2020)

== Filmography ==
=== Cinema ===
- Ciao marziano, directed by Pier Francesco Pingitore (1980)
- Il casinista, directed by Pier Francesco Pingitore (1980)
- Il tango della gelosia, directed by Steno (1981)
- Biancaneve &amp; Co., directed by Mario Bianchi (1982)
- W la foca, directed by Nando Cicero (1982)
- Attenti a quei P2, directed by Pier Francesco Pingitore (1982)
- An Ideal Adventure, directed by Steno (1982)
- Bonnie and Clyde Italian Style, directed by Steno (1983)
- Il tifoso, l'arbitro e il calciatore, directed by Francesco Pingitore (1983)
- "FF.SS." – Cioè: "...che mi hai portato a fare sopra a Posillipo se non mi vuoi più bene?", directed by Renzo Arbore (1983)
- Sfrattato cerca casa equo canone, directed by Pier Francesco Pingitore (1983)
- Gole ruggenti, directed by Francesco Pingitore (1992)
- Chiavi in mano, directed by Mariano Laurenti (1996)
- La partita, cortometraggio (2007)
- Qui a Manduria tutto bene, directed by Enzo Pisconti (2008)
- Nemici, directed by Milo Vallone (2020)
- Il Divin Codino, directed by Letizia Lamartire (2021)

=== Television ===
- Ladri si nasce, directed by Pier Francesco Pingitore – film TV (1997)
- Ladri si diventa, directed by Pier Francesco Pingitore – film TV (1998)
- Villa Ada, directed by Pier Francesco Pingitore – film TV (2000)
- La casa delle beffe, directed by Pier Francesco Pingitore – film TV (2000)
- Di che peccato sei?, directed by Pier Francesco Pingitore – film TV (2007)

== Books ==
- Martufello (1995). Di più, nin zo' (in Italian). Rome: Gremese Editore. ICCU IT\ICCU\RMS\2479854.
- Martufello, Claudio; Napoleone (2007). Il riso fa buon sangue... figuriamoci il risotto (in Italian). Rome: CISU. ICCU IT\ICCU\BVE\0460566.
- Martufello, Claudio; Napoleone (2010). Ritete con me... cioè... io. Rome: MGC. ISBN 978-88-488-1177-4.

== Sister projects ==
- Media related to Martufello at Wikimedia Commons
