= The Throne of Fire (film) =

- Directed by: Franco Prosperi
- Screenplay by: Nino Marino
- Story by: Nino Marino; Giuseppe Buricchi
- Produced by: Ettore Spagnuolo
- Starring: Sabrina Siani; Pietro Torrisi; Harrison Muller, Jr.; Beni Cardoso
- Cinematography: Guglielmo Mancori
- Edited by: Alessandro Lucidi
- Music by: Carlo Rustichelli
- Production company: Visione Cinematografica
- Release date: 17 June 1983 (Italy)
- Running time: 89 minutes
- Country: Italy

The Throne of Fire (Italian: Il trono di fuoco) is a 1983 Italian film directed by Franco Prosperi, starring Sabrina Siani and Pietro Torrisi. The film is among the peplums of the 1980s to feature a woman as the central character, along with Red Sonja, Hundra and Barbarian Queen.

== Production ==
Parts of Throne of Fire were shot at Bracciano in Rome with interiors shot at De Paolis Studios and Elios studios in Rome. The film reuses the village raid sequence from the 1982 film Barbarian Master.

== Release ==
The Throne of Fire was released on 17 June 1983 in Italy and on 5 June 1986 in the United States.

== Reception ==
In his overview of 1980s action films, Daniel R. Budnik described the film as a "Conan rip-off from Italy" that was closer to "peplum from the late 1950s" and had a similar "meandering feel" that the films of that era had.
