= Ex 2: Still Friends? =

- Film poster
- Ex - Amici come prima! (Italian)
- Directed by: Carlo Vanzina
- Screenplay by: Enrico Vanzina; Carlo Vanzina
- Produced by: Federica Lucisano; Fulvio Lucisano
- Starring: Enrico Brignano; Tosca D'Aquino; Anna Foglietta; Alessandro Gassmann; Teresa Mannino; Ricky Memphis; Gabriella Pession; Paolo Ruffini; Liz Solari; Natasha Stefanenko; Vincenzo Salemme
- Cinematography: Carlo Tafani
- Edited by: Raimondo Crociani
- Music by: Giuliano Taviani; Carmelo Travia
- Production companies: Italian International Film; Rai Cinema
- Distributed by: RAI
- Release date: 7 October 2011
- Running time: 98 minutes
- Country: Italy
- Language: Italian

Ex 2: Still Friends? (Italian: Ex - Amici come prima!) is a 2011 Italian romantic comedy film directed by Carlo Vanzina.

It is a sequel to 2009 film Many Kisses Later (Ex) and it was produced by Italian International Film and distributed by 01 Distribution, a subsidiary of Rai Cinema.

== Plot ==
Fabio's girlfriend Esther dumps him with a text message. Devastated, he attempts to jump from the roof terrace of his office but his colleagues manage to hold him back. However, in their grapple they knock over a flowerpot, which falls onto the street below, narrowly missing the car of lawyer Sandra. Just then Max pulls into the parking space which Sandra had meant to occupy, after half an hour of searching. After a heated discourse she finally arrives at her office, late for an appointment with Mrs Marangoni, who wants to file for divorce after her husband left her. Believing he is cheating on her, she is seeking revenge. Sandra reveals her own recent breakup, and the two women quickly bond. Unbeknownst to Sandra, her client's husband is no one other than Max.

Antonio, a pharmacist from Sorrento and newly elected Member of the European Parliament, is celebrating his new position. His wife Nunzia appears to be more excited about it than himself, as she is seeking to exploit her husband's position for financial advantage. As Antonio is approached by two old friends asking for “favors”, she demands 30% of any profit Antonio helps them gain. As she accompanies Antonio to the airport (not without lecturing him on what she expects him to do in Brussels), she wishes him a good journey, though he insists that her good wishes will bring him bad luck.

Newlyweds Floriana and Marco are also at the airport, leaving for their honeymoon. As Marco parks the car, he encounters his old flame Consuelo. They had planned to go on a date five years earlier but waited for each other in different locations, believing the other had lost interest. Consuelo is still single, and Marco claims the same. They exchange phone numbers.

Fabio, somewhat calmed down after the incident on the roof, has been accompanied home by his colleague Paolo, who tries to cheer him up by repeating to him the pleasures of the single life he is enjoying himself, but Fabio is not convinced. Upon spotting a photography of Esther, right after Paolo has left, he attempts to jump from the balcony of his apartment. This time, Professor Rinaldi, a psychiatrist who has his practice on the floor below Fabio's apartment, manages to stop him and convinces him to seek his professional advice.

In a bar, Paolo is trying to hit on a girl named Alessia. Sandra is in the same bar with a friend, who is looking out for male company and also trying to get Sandra hooked up with someone, but Sandra is visibly not interested and leaves soon after. It is raining, and there are no taxis available. She tries to grab a free taxi, only to discover that Max had the same idea at the same moment. Another argument ensues, and after discovering they are both going to Lungotevere, they agree to share the taxi.

Paolo has been successful with Alessia and they arrive at her place. He is somewhat surprised to see that she lives with her parents, but she reassures him that they are “modern” and more worried about her not returning home at night that they are about her bringing a one-night stand home. Eventually she ends up summoning her entire family for help when Paolo has trouble putting on his preservative.

Antonio's flight to Brussels has been forced to land in Munich due to the eruption of an Icelandic volcano, in which Antonio sees the "curse" of his wife confirmed. In a crowded restaurant he encounters Olga, who is from the Baltics. The waiter, apparently from Campania like Antonio, had decided to serve Antonio first, even though Olga had ordered the same schnitzel almost an hour earlier. Antonio, put off by this favoritism, offers it to Olga, and they eventually agree to share Olga's schnitzel and Antonio's bottle of wine. The wine and their shared passion for Italian opera break the ice between them and when, after a long and pleasant evening, Antonio locks himself out of his hotel room, they spend the night together. In the morning, however, she reveals to him that she is married.

Upon arriving at her place, Sandra discovers that she has forgotten her keys. Max takes her to his place, eventually offering her to stay for the night, and she realizes he is not as rude and arrogant as she first thought. They spend the night together. In the morning, Max runs off in a hurry to take his kids to school, but not before exchanging phone numbers—and names—with Sandra. As he is staying at the place of a friend, who is away in New York City, Sandra does not recognize the name on the door and thus does not realize that he is the husband of her client. Even as they talk at the bar in the evening, and Sandra points out similarities between Max's divorce and her client, she dismisses the possibility.

Floriana and Marco are spending their honeymoon on a cruise ship, where Marco goes to great lengths to prevent his affectionate, albeit slightly suffocating wife from discovering his attempts to get in touch with Consuelo.

Fabio tries to start a new, active life, only to bump into Esther and her new boyfriend on his first day at the gym. He runs off to see Rinaldi. The latter is out of the office but is expected to be back in an hour. Fabio agrees to wait in his office while the receptionist goes on her lunch break. Just then, Valentina storms into the office. She has just been left by her boyfriend and threatens suicide if the professor (for whom she mistakes Fabio) will not listen to her immediately. Fabio plays the part and learns Valentina's boyfriend Guido has dumped her with a text message much like the one that Esther had sent him. Valentina is devastated, as she and Guido had agreed on everything, except for their choice of salad—the very difference Esther mentioned in her breakup message to Fabio. Realizing the professor will soon be back, Fabio interrupts the session and agrees to see Valentina again the next day, with whom he has fallen in love instantly.

It is Antonio's first day at the European Parliament and he encounters the other two Italian MEPs, Pasquale Lo Foco and Giovanni Ventolin. The first person to speak at the session is no one other than Olga Tammsaare, Antonio's acquaintance from Munich. Antonio is shocked to see her and learn that she is a prime minister. As the three Italians go for lunch, Lo Foco and Ventolin show Antonio the web sites of escorts the two are frequently seeing, but Antonio's mind is occupied with Olga and he is, again, put off by the same attitude he has come to dislike in his wife. He reprimands his colleagues for their behavior and leaves the restaurant.

Floriana and Marco have returned from their honeymoon, and it is their first day back at the bank where they both work. Consuelo has just returned from Paris and invites Marco to her place. Marco obtains an alibi from his colleague Marullo so he can sneak away. However, right in front of Consuelo's place, he is taken hostage by a terrorist trying to escape from the police. The hostage taking is televised live, and Marco scrambles to explain the incident to Floriana, who has followed it on TV.

Antonio receives a call from his wife, who lectures him once more and wishes him goodnight. The bad luck he expects it to bring about follows immediately: Lo Foco knocks on his door, asking him to hide an escort in his room, as his wife is coming for a surprise visit. He has just closed the door when Olga knocks outside, and Antonio tells the escort to hide under the bed. Olga, equally shocked upon seeing Antonio at the European Parliament, reminds him to not reveal to anyone what happened in Munich.

Valentina sees Fabio again and reveals that during a sleepless night she has decided to seek out one-night stands, as she has had only three men in her life. That night Fabio has a nightmare about Valentina making out with a plumber. He is woken up by a phone call from Valentina, who asks to postpone their next session because she needs to call the plumber. Terrified, Fabio tries to stop her until she reassures him that the plumber's visit will be a purely professional one. They meet again two days later, and Valentina reveals to Fabio (whom she still believes to be Professor Rinaldi) that she has fallen in love with him and wants to cancel their patient relationship, as the supposed professor's work ethics presumably prevent him from going any further.

Sandra is summoned to her boss's office, surprised to find Mrs Marangoni there, who has found out about her and Max through a detective. Her boss fires her on the spot, and she angrily confronts Max about it, believing he sought her out on purpose. Valentina has also discovered the truth when attempting to pay for her sessions with Professor Rinaldi, and makes Fabio an angry scene.

Antonio has travelled to Vilnius to meet Olga again, but she explains that her responsibilities make it impossible for her to continue their relationship. The same day, she phones him and unexpectedly invites him to spend the weekend with her. Antonio accepts, but to his surprise Olga's husband and two children are also present. During a conversation over dinner, both Olga and her husband mention the sacrifices Olga has made to enter politics, and that she cannot betray the trust her country has placed in her. Antonio is finally convinced not to pursue a romantic relationship with Olga any further.

After Consuelo has unexpectedly turned up at Mario's workplace and stormed out angrily upon learning that Mario is married to Floriana, Mario continues to pursue her. She demands that Mario choose between Floriana and her. As Floriana is spending an evening out with her friends, he leaves her a note, declaring he is leaving her, and arrives at Consuelo's door with a suitcase. However, when in an unattended moment he finds her diary, he discovers that she frequently changes partners and is just looking for financial security in him, already with no intentions of being faithful. Realizing what he has in Floriana, Marco remorsefully returns home, just in time to grab the note from the hands of Floriana (who has just returned home), "read" it to her—substituting the content with a declaration of his love for her—and swallows the letter.

Paolo, just having been turned down by a girl, receives a call from Fabio, asking him to deliver a eulogy if "something were to happen" to him. Fabio is ready to jump to his death from a bridge, but his plans are disrupted by the presence of Valentina, who is standing on the brim of the same bridge for the same reason. Fabio finally reveals how Esther dumped him the day before he met Valentina, the same way Guido broke up with Valentina, and falling in love with her kept him from committing suicide. As both abandon their suicide plans and slowly balance towards each other, Valentina slips and both fall off the bridge, only to land on a boat passing below.

As Sandra is collecting her things in the office, one of her clients comes in with a video of her husband that a friend of hers has filmed in a bar. Her boss is in court for the Marangoni case, so Sandra rushes there and presents the video. It shows Mrs Marangoni with her lover—the husband of her other client—discussing how Sandra and Max met by chance, neither of them knowing that Sandra represented Max's wife, and how they are going to use it against Max. Max ends up winning the case, and he and Sandra leave the courthouse together before parting ways, as Sandra is leaving the same evening for her new job in London.

Antonio returns home, having resigned from his office, and receives a cold welcome from his wife, who disapproves of his decision. He lectures her on values in politics, and declares that he will return to his pharmacy and divorce her.

One year later, Valentina and Fabio are about to go on vacation. As Valentina enters a shop at the airport, Fabio runs into Esther, who expresses regret at leaving Fabio and suggests that they give it another try. However, Fabio tells her it is too late, as he is now very happy. Meanwhile, inside the shop, Valentina has a similar unexpected encounter with Guido, and Valentina and Fabio walk off together.

Floriana and Marco are leaving for their second honeymoon. At the airport they meet Consuelo, who reveals that she is going on honeymoon as well, having recently married Paolo.

Max, on his way to Berlin, bumps into Sandra at the airport, who is returning to London after a visit to her parents. They meet again at the security queue. Max announces that he has changed his flight and is planning to go to London with Sandra, only to learn that she had a similar idea and has booked a flight to Berlin. They spontaneously decide to rebook once more and go to The Bahamas.

Antonio is enjoying the view of the sea from his favorite bench and is unexpectedly joined by Olga (whom he had told about this spot during their weekend in Vilnius). She is on her way to a G20 summit in Naples. Antonio reveals that he has resigned from politics and got divorced, while Olga is still married.

== Cast ==
- Alessandro Gassman as Max Marangoni
- Vincenzo Salemme as Antonio Schiavone
- Ricky Memphis as Fabio
- Enrico Brignano as Marco
- Teresa Mannino as Floriana
- Gabriella Pession as Valentina
- Tosca D'Aquino as Nunzia
- Natasha Stefanenko as Olga Tammsaare
- Paolo Ruffini as Paolo Groppi
- Anna Foglietta as Sandra
- Veronika Logan as Mrs Marangoni
- Elena Barolo as Esther

== Trivia ==
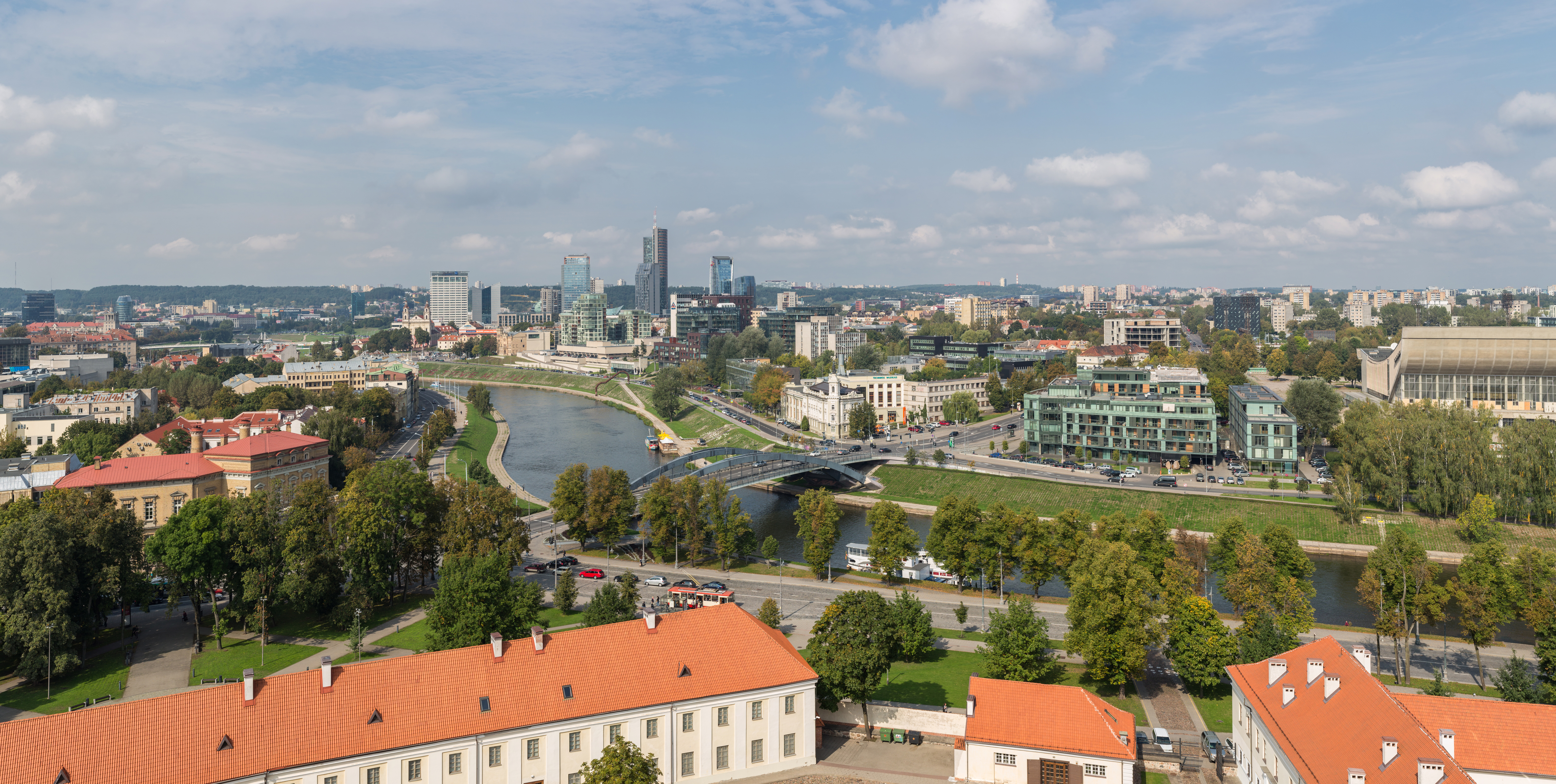
Vilnius, as viewed from Gediminas’ Tower looking north-west, a perspective similar to the one shown in the film.

- The country which Olga is from is never revealed directly. Her last name, Tammsaare, is Estonian, and when Olga is shown in what appears to be her office, the Estonian flag is seen in the background, next to the EU flag. However, Olga speaks Lithuanian at several points in the film. The scene in which Antonio travels to visit Olga opens with a view of Vilnius, and several of the vehicles shown have Lithuanian number plates.
- The film Floriana is watching prior to seeing the live footage of Marco being taken hostage is Many Kisses Later (Italian: Ex), the prequel to the film.
