= CentoVetrine =

Italian soap opera 2001–2016

- Genre: Soap opera
- Created by: Cristiana Farina
- Starring: See below
- Country of origin: Italy
- Original language: Italian
- No. of seasons: 15
- No. of episodes: 3318

Production
- Running time: 23 minutes
- Production company: Mediavivere

Original release
- Network: Canale 5
- Release: 8 January 2001 – 8 August 2016

CentoVetrine ("Hundred Windows") is an Italian soap opera which was broadcast on Canale 5 from 8 January 2001 to 8 August 2016. First-run episodes were briefly broadcast on Rete 4 from 15 December 2014 to 10 March 2015.

== Premise ==
The series is set in and around the shopping center CentoVetrine, located at the foot of the Alps, just outside Turin. It is owned by Ettore Ferri (Roberto Alpi), with Ivan Bettini (Pietro Genuardi) as CEO and Ettore's daughter, Anita Ferri (Daniela Fazzolari), as vice president and editor of Cento magazine. Other long running cast members include Elisabetta Coraini as Laura Beccaria, Sergio Troiano as Valerio Bettini, Melania Maccaferri as Francesca Bettini and Camillo Milli as Ugo Monti. CentoVetrine follows the lives, loves and conflicts of these and other characters related to the shopping center.

== Series overview ==
Series	Episodes	Originally released		
Series	Episodes	First released	Last released	Network
1	145	8 January 2001	27 July 2001	Canale 5
2	235	27 August 2001	12 July 2002	Canale 5
3	235	2 September 2002	11 July 2003	Canale 5
4	225	1 September 2003	23 July 2004	Canale 5
5	215	30 August 2004	22 July 2005	Canale 5
6	225	2 September 2005	11 August 2006	Canale 5
7	231	28 August 2006	27 July 2007	Canale 5
8	224	3 September 2007	1 August 2008	Canale 5
9	228	25 August 2008	31 July 2009	Canale 5
10	229	24 August 2009	30 July 2010	Canale 5
11	234	23 August 2010	5 August 2011	Canale 5
12	270	23 August 2011	6 July 2012	Canale 5
13	238	28 August 2012	12 September 2013	Canale 5
14	192	13 September 2013	24 September 2014	Canale 5
15	192	25 September 2014	12 December 2014	Canale 5
15	192	15 December 2014	10 March 2015	Rete 4
15	192	7 June 2016	8 August 2016	Canale 5

== Cast ==
Actor	Character	Season														
Actor	Character	1	2	3	4	5	6	7	8	9	10	11	12	13	14	15
Elisabetta Coraini	Laura Beccaria	Main	Main	Main	Main	Main	Main	Main	Main	Main	Main	Main	Main	Main	Main	Main
Sergio Troiano	Valerio Bettini	Main	Main	Main	Main	Main	Main	Main	Main	Main	Main	Main	Main	Main	Main	Main
Pietro Genuardi	Ivan Bettini	Main	Main	Main	Main	Main	Main	Main	Main	Main	Main	Main	Main	Main	Main	
Melania Maccaferri	Francesca Bettini	Main	Main	Main	Main	Main	Main	Main				Guest	Recurring			
Camillo Milli	Ugo Monti	Main	Main	Main	Main	Main	Main	Main				Guest				
Sabrina Marinucci	Rosa Bianco	Main	Main	Main	Main	Main	Main					Guest	Recurring			
Clemente Pernarella	Paolo Monti	Main	Main	Main	Main	Main	Main					Guest				
Massimo Bulla	Gabriele Andreasi	Main	Main	Main	Main	Main	Main									
Daniela Fazzolari	Anita Ferri	Main	Main	Main	Main	Main						Guest				
Daniela Fazzolari	Diana Cancellieri Ferri												Recurring	Main	Main	
Roberto Alpi	Ettore Ferri	Main	Main	Main	Main					Main	Main	Main	Main	Main	Main	Main
Francesca Reviglio	Benedetta Monti	Main	Main	Main	Main	Recurring	Recurring	Recurring				Guest				
Serena Bonanno	Elena Novelli Ferri	Main	Main	Main												
Roberto Farnesi	Giuliano Corsini	Main	Main	Main												
Mary Asiride	Fatima Hazim	Main	Main	Recurring												
Anna Stante	Beatrice Le Goff	Recurring	Main	Main	Main		Recurring									
Raffaella Bergé	Marina Kröeger		Recurring	Main	Main				Main							
Flavio Montrucchio	Alessandro Torre			Main	Main	Main	Main	Main								
Vanessa Gravina	Claudia Corelli			Main	Main											
Luca Ward	Massimo Forti			Main	Main											
Alessandro Mario	Marco Della Rocca				Main	Main	Main	Main	Main	Main						Main
Alessandro Mario	Lorenzo Marasco						Main	Main								
Anna Safroncik	Anna Baldi/Angelica Levi				Main	Main	Main	Main	Main							
Morena Salvino	Chiara Baldi/Priscilla Levi				Main	Main	Main	Main	Main							
Danilo Brugia	Stefano Della Rocca					Main	Main	Main	Main	Main						Main
Luca Biagini	Edoardo Della Rocca					Main	Main	Main	Main	Main	Guest				Guest	Guest
Mirca Viola	Asia Ricci					Main	Main	Main								
Elena Barolo	Vittoria Della Rocca					Main	Main	Recurring								
Marco Falaguasta	Michele Raggi						Main	Main	Main							
Francesca Rettondini	Gloria Santini						Main	Main	Main							
Marianna De Micheli	Carol Grimani							Main	Main	Main	Main	Main	Main	Main	Main	Main
Serena Iansiti	Lavinia Grimani							Main	Main	Main	Recurring	Recurring				
Ivan Bacchi	Walter Caridi							Main	Main							
Glenda Cima	Silvia Saint Clair							Main	Main							
Luca Ferrante	Matteo De Gregorio							Recurring	Main	Main						
Eleonora Di Miele	Alessia Righi								Main	Main	Main	Recurring	Recurring			
Luca Capuano	Adriano Riva								Main	Main	Main	Main	Main			
Carlotta Lo Greco	Bianca De Gregorio								Main	Main						
Enrico Mutti	Daniele Ferrari								Main	Main						
Sara Zanier	Serena Bassani									Main	Main	Main	Main	Main		
Raffaello Balzo	Niccolò Castelli									Main	Main	Main	Guest			
Caterina Vertova	Rossana Grimani									Main	Main	Main				
Stefano Davanzati	Corrado Braschi									Main	Main					
Jgor Barbazza	Damiano Bauer										Main	Main	Main	Main	Main	Main
Alex Belli	Jacopo Castelli										Main	Main	Main	Main	Main	Main
Linda Collini	Cecilia Castelli										Main	Main	Main	Main	Main	Main
Claudia Alfonso	Paola Ventura										Main	Main				
Alessandro Etrusco	Riccardo Braschi										Main					
Barbara Clara	Viola Castelli											Main	Main	Main	Main	Main
Michele D'Anca	Sebastian Castelli											Main	Main	Main	Main	Main
Giusi Cataldo	Matilda Herrera-Diaz												Main	Main	Main	Main
Luciano Roman	Leo Brera/Fernando Torrealta														Main	Main

== Production ==
The series was produced by Mediavivere and taped at Telecittà Studios in San Giusto Canavese, Turin.

== Broadcast ==
CentoVentrine debuted as an afternoon series on Canale 5 on 8 January 2001. The average audience over the show's first 10 years was 4 million viewers, with a 28% share and peaks of 36%.

The series was moved to Rete 4 on 15 December 2014, airing Monday through Friday in prime time at 8:05 PM. This put the series in direct competition with the popular Rai 3 drama Un posto al sole, which was Italy's most-watched soap opera at the time.

The last episode was broadcast on Rete 4 on 10 March 2015, though a number of unaired episodes remained. The remaining 72 episodes were later broadcast in Italy on Canale 5 in a morning time slot from 7 June to 8 August 2016.

Starting 15 June 2023, all episodes of the series have been made available for streaming on the Italian streaming platform Mediaset Infinity.
