= Teresa Mannino =

Italian comedian (born 1970)

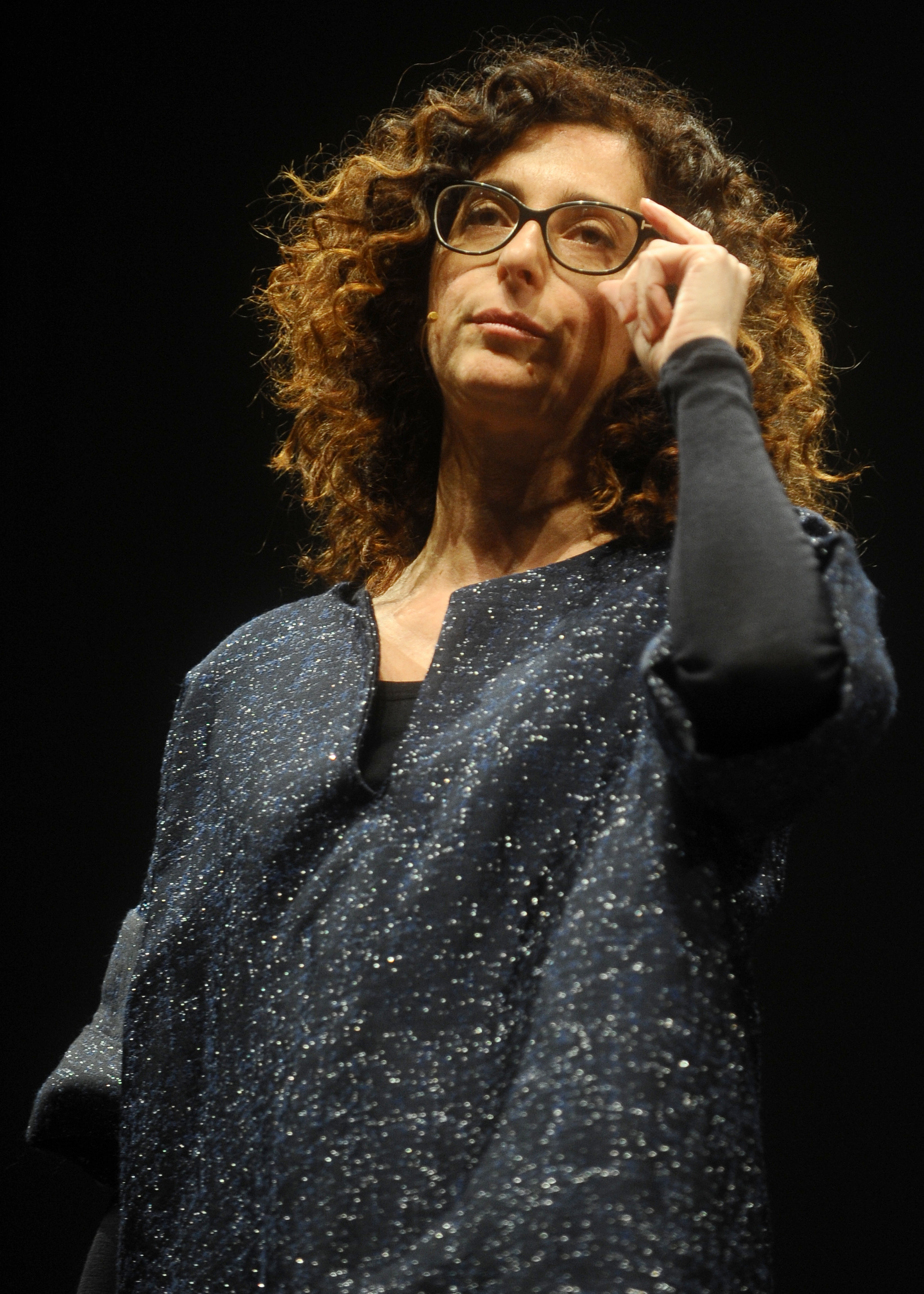
- Born: 23 November 1970 (age 55); Palermo, Italy
- Occupations: Comedian; actress

Teresa Mannino (born 23 November 1970) is an Italian comedian, actress, and television personality.

== Biography ==
Born in Palermo, Mannino graduated in philosophy, and then she moved to Milan, where she enrolled in the Teatro Carcano European Drama School.

After several other courses and workshops, she became a stand-up comedian and began appearing in the Canale 5 variety show Zelig. Mannino is active on stage, in films and in many TV commercials. In 2012 she hosted a one-woman-show on La 7, Se stasera sono qui. In an interview, she defined the latter show as a "show talk", rather than a "talk show", meaning that the show would host characters who would hold mini-talks on aspects of society and culture.

Mannino co-hosted the third night of the Sanremo Music Festival 2024 alongside Amadeus.

== Filmography ==
=== Film ===
Year	Title	Role(s)	Notes
2008	Love, Soccer and Other Catastrophes	Teresa	
2008	La fidanzata di papà	Luminosa	
2009	Meno male che ci sei	Barbara	
2010	A Natale mi sposo	Gina	
2011	Ex 2: Still Friends?	Floriana	
2012	Buona giornata	Rosaria Miccichè	
2016	Zootopia	Fru Fru	Italian dub; voice role
2019	La notte è piccola per noi	Enrica	
2023	Io e mio fratello	Aunt Tecla	

=== Television ===
Year	Title	Role(s)	Notes
2004–2022	Zelig Off	Herself / Co-host	Variety show (season 8-20)
2009	Checco Zalone Show	Herself / Co-host	Special
2009	Il commissario Manara	Teresa	Episode: "Un morto di troppo"
2012	Benvenuti a tavola	Lucia	Main role (season 1)
2012	Terrybilmente divagante	Herself / Host	Special
2013	Altrimenti ci arrabbiamo	Herself / Judge	Talent show
2014	Andrea Camilleri - Il maestro senza regole	Herself	Television documentary
2016	Sono nata il ventitré	Herself / Host	Special
2016	Inspector Montalbano	Lucia Gambardella	Episode: "La piramide di fango"
2024	Sanremo Music Festival 2024	Herself / Co-host	Music festival
