= Mortacci =

- Directed by: Sergio Citti
- Written by: David Grieco; Vincenzo Cerami; Ottavio Jemma; Sergio Citti
- Produced by: Gioanfranco Piccioli; Giorgio Leopardi
- Starring: Carol Alt; Malcolm McDowell; Gemelli Ruggeri; Galeazzo Benti; Andy Luotto; Aldo Giuffrè; Alvaro Vitali; Michela Miti; Nino Frassica; Sergio Rubini; Mariangela Melato; Vittorio Gassman
- Cinematography: Cristiano Pogany
- Edited by: Ugo De Rossi
- Music by: Francesco De Masi
- Release date: 1989
- Running time: 110 min
- Country: Italy
- Language: Italian

Mortacci is a 1989 Italian black comedy film, directed by Sergio Citti.

The film is set in a cemetery, where the dead souls gather every night, awaiting permission to enter the afterlife. They reminisce about their past lives and the circumstances surrounding their deaths, while observing the living and witnessing their misdeeds.

== Plot summary ==
In a small town cemetery, the deceased gather every night for a meeting. They are doomed to remain there until the last living person who remembers them passes away. Through recollections of their lives and deaths, various characters are introduced: Alma, a theater actress (Carol Alt) who witnesses every night the futile attempt of her ex-lover (Malcolm McDowell) to commit suicide over her grave; Angelo, a womanizer (Andy Luotto) who died out of shame; Felice and Giggetto, two beggars (Eraldo Turra and Luciano Manzalini) who leave the group when the last woman (Mariangela Melato) who remembers them dies during a visit to their grave.

The narration is interrupted by the arrival of Lucillo (Sergio Rubini), a soldier presumed dead in a Lebanese military mission, who is forced by his fellow villagers to actually die, as they have built a lucrative business around his hero status and fame. Cemetery warden Domenico (Vittorio Gassman) oversees the operations, from opening the gates to stealing valuables from the dead, unaware that the deceased observe him and everything that occurs in the small cemetery.

== Cast ==
- Vittorio Gassman as Domenico
- Carol Alt as Alma Rossetti
- Malcolm McDowell as Edmondo
- Galeazzo Benti as Tommaso Grillo
- Mariangela Melato as Jolanda
- Sergio Rubini as Lucillo Cardellini
- Nino Frassica as La guida
- Andy Luotto as Angelo Cuoco, aka "Scopone"
- Aldo Giuffrè as the undertaker
- Alvaro Vitali as Torquato
- Silvana Bosi as Torquato's mother
- Eraldo Turra as Felice
- Luciano Manzalini as Giggetto
- Donald O'Brien as Archibald Williams
- Michela Miti as the bartender
- Gina Rovere as Ada
