= Natalia Bush =

Spanish model

- Born: 14 December 1984 (age 40); Tenerife, Canary Islands

Natalia Mesa Bush (born 14 December 1984) is a Spanish model, showgirl and actress.

== Early life ==
Bush was born in Tenerife in the Canary Islands of Spain. She is a daughter of a Spanish mother and South African father of origins half U.S. and half Afrikaner. She was discovered at age 16, when she was on a beach in her country, as a talent scout noticed her while sunbathing with her friends.

== Biography ==
In 2005, Natalia Bush was named Miss Tenerife. In the same year, Natalia won another beauty contest in Italy, when she was elected Girl of the Year by the underwear line of Intimo Roberta: subsequently, she was chosen to advertise the brand's products; entry into television, Natalia, in the same year, became a showgirl in a television program on the private channel Canale Italia, as soubrette of the quiz game called In bocca al lupo and hosted by Marco Predolin. In the winter of 2006, Natalia Bush entered in the major national television because she participated as showgirl in the variety of Rai 1 I raccomandati conducted by Carlo Conti. Natalia in 2006 won the beauty contest Miss Fashion TV Greece and later she posed for two sexy calendars for the year 2007, one for Fapim and one for Roberta. In the winter of 2007, Natalia participated as showgirl in the game show of Italia 1 Distraction Italia, hosted by Enrico Papi. At the end of 2007 Natalia Bush posed for the 2008 nude calendar of the Spanish magazine Interviú. In the autumn of 2008 Natalia participated as a contestant in the third edition of La talpa, the Italian version of The Mole aired by Italia 1 and hosted by Paola Perego with Paola Barale. At the end of 2008 Natalia made her debut as actress of cinema with the feature film La fidanzata di papà, alongside Simona Ventura and Massimo Boldi. In the spring of 2009 Natalia participated, with the role of the primadonna, in the variety of Canale 5 Bellissima - Cabaret anticrisi produced by the Compagnia del Bagaglino. In 2014 she became one of the female lead of the Lory Del Santo's first webseries The Lady - L'amore sconosciuto. She recited in the Lory Del Santo's second webseries The Lady - L'odio passionale in 2016. She lives in Italy since 2005.

== Television ==
- In bocca al lupo (Canale Italia, 2005)
- I raccomandati (Rai 1, 2006)
- Distraction Italia (Italia 1, 2007)
- La talpa 3 (Italia 1, 2008)
- Bellissima - Cabaret anticrisi (Canale 5, 2009)
- Fenomenal (Italia 1, 2011)

== Filmography ==
- A Light of Passion (2008)
- La fidanzata di papà (2008)
- The Lady – webseries (2014–2016)
