= The Sword of the Barbarians =

- Sangraal, la spada di fuoco
- Directed by: Michele Massimo Tarantini
- Screenplay by: Piero Regnoli
- Story by: Michele Massimo Tarantini
- Produced by: Pino Buricchi; Umberto Innocenzi; Ettore Spagnuolo
- Starring: Pietro Torrisi; Sabrina Siani; Yvonne Fraschetti; Mario Novelli
- Cinematography: Pasquale Fanetti
- Edited by: Alessandro Lucidi
- Music by: Franco Campanino
- Release date: 27 November 1982 (Italy)
- Running time: 85 minutes
- Country: Italy
- Language: Italian

The Sword of the Barbarians (Italian: Sangraal, la spada di fuoco. Lit. Sangraal, the Sword of Fire) is an Italian 1982 sword-and-sorcery film directed by Michele Massimo Tarantini and starring Peter McCoy and Sabrina Siani. The film is also known as Barbarian Master. The village raid scene in this film was reused a year later in another Italian film, The Throne of Fire (1983).

== Plot ==
The movie introduces Sangraal, son of king Ator, whose realm and people are destroyed by evil warlord Nantuk. Sangraal and the remainder of his people flee his wrath and begin searching for a new home. After defending some villagers from an attack by Nantuk's troops, the villagers gladly accept the newcomers as part of their community. Their leader, Belem, even offers Sangraal co-rulership. Meanwhile, the warlord - who has assumed kinghood after Ator's fall - has angered the Goddess of Fire and Death, to whom he owes his power and whose cult he leads. She demands that Sangraal be sacrificed or Nantuk will lose his power, his kingdom, and his life.

Nantuk sends out more men to destroy the village sheltering Sangraal, and has his troops murder everyone while the captured and crucified protagonist must watch. He witnesses his wife's death at the hands of the Goddess of Fire and Death and falls unconscious before being freed by Belem's daughter, Ati, and Li Wo Twan, a travelling archer.

After Ati and Li Wo Twan patch the barbarian up, Sangraal decides to visit the powerful wizard Rudak, who might have the power to bring his wife back to life. Meanwhile, Nantuk promises his Goddess to torture Sangraal and cast him into her fiery altar with his own hands.

The trio narrowly manages to escape several ambushes and finally makes it to the mountain where Rudak dwells. Rudak, however, convinces Sangraal to finally let go of his dead wife, as no one has the power to bring back the dead. Instead, Sangraal must face his destiny and fight evil: he must seek out a shrine which contains everything he needs to win this battle.

The journey ahead is dangerous, even without Nantuk's servants and their ambushes, but the trio is able to overcome all the obstacles and escape the traps set up for them. Despite getting captured several times, Sangraal finally manages to find the shrine Rudak had mentioned, which contains a powerful, magical crossbow. However, Ati and Li Wo Twan are ambushed once more, leaving the archer dead and Ati captured.

Sangraal then pursues Ati and her capturers all the way to Nantuk's headquarters, which contains the Goddesses' altar. He challenges the evil king to a duel, and prevails over him, impaling him on his own dagger.

Afterwards, the protagonist returns to the late king's cave, to find Ati abandoned by Nantuk's servants. Before they can leave, the Goddess reappears and threatens to take both Sangraal and Ati's life, laughing at the blade Sangraal considers swinging at her and burning it, but her laughter ends when the barbarian loads his magical crossbow and kills her with a shot in the gut.

The movie ends with a shot of Sangraal and Ati riding into freedom.

== Cast ==
- Pietro Torrisi as Sangraal (credited as Peter McCoy)
- Sabrina Siani as The Goddess of Gold and Life
- Yvonne Fraschetti as Ati
- Mario Novelli as Nantuk
- Hal Yamanouchi as Li Wo Twan
- Xiomara Rodriguez as Rani, Goddess of Fire and Death
- Margareta Rance as Lenna
- Alex Partexano as Galeth
- Luciano Rossi as Belem

== Release ==
The Sword of the Barbarians was released in Italy on 27 November 1982 with an 85-minute running time. It was released in the United States on 4 November 1983 with an 83-minute run time.

== See also ==
- List of Italian films of 1982
