= La Fattoria season 4 =

La Fattoria 4. The fourth edition of The farm was broadcast from March 8, 2009 on Canale 5, for a total of seven episodes with the conduct of Paola Perego and Mara Venier, sent to Brazil. Opinion leaders in the study are fixed Bruganelli Sonia (also known as the wife of Paul Bonolis), the radio presenter Anna Pettinelli and Raffaello Tonon.

The contestants of the reality show are divided into "peasants" and in a smaller group that forms the "caste". Caste plays an important role: for they decide who to assign daily tasks, check if you have performed well and, most importantly, choose one of two competitors who must go to the nomination.

The transmission was won by Marco Baldini radio host who has donated the entire amount of the prize, consisting of 100,000 euros for the earthquake victims of Abruzzo.

== Contestants ==
- Marco Baldini – Radio Host.
- Morena Funari – widow of Gianfranco Funari.
- Milo Coretti – winner of Grande Fratello 7.
- Guillaume Goufan – Model.
- Ciro Petrone – Actor.
- Lory Del Santo – Showgirl.
- Barbara Guerra – Model.
- Marianne Puglia – Model.
- Linda Batista – Model.
- Rocco Pietrantonio – Model.
- Riccardo Sardonè – Model.
- Carla Velli – Uomini e Donne Contestant
- Fabrizio Corona – Photographer.
- Giovanna Rei – Actress.
- Marina Ripa di Meana – Wife of Alessandro Lante della Rovere.
- Daniela Martani – Housemate in Grande Fratello 9.

== Nominations ==
	Round 1	Round 2	Round 3		Round 4	Round 5	Round 6	Round 7	Final
Componenti della casta	–	Linda; Fabrizio; Marina	Marco; Linda; Ciro	Marco; Linda; Ciro	Milo; Lory; Barbara	Lory; Marianne	Milo; Morena	Guillame	
Marco Baldini	–	Barbara	Morena	Fabrizio	Marianne	Linda	Guillame	Ciro	Winner (Day 43)
Morena Funari	–	Barbara	Fabrizio	Barbara	Ciro	Linda	Lory	Ciro	Runner-Up (Day 43)
Milo Coretti				Exempt	Ciro	Ciro	Lory	Ciro	3rd Place (Day 43)
Guillame Goufan						Exempt	Ciro	Morena	Evicted (Day 43)
Ciro Petrone	–	Carla	Morena	Fabrizio	Carla	Milo	Barbara	Milo	Evicted (Day 43)
Lory Del Santo				Exempt	Morena	Barbara	Barbara	Evicted (Day 39)	
Barbara Guerra	–	Morena	Marianne	Rocco	Morena	Ciro	Ciro	Evicted (Day 39)	
Marianne Puglia	–	Morena	Riccardo	Riccardo	Riccardo	Barbara	Evicted (Day 29)		
Linda Batista	–	Giovanna	Morena	Carla	Carla	Morena	Evicted (Day 29)		
Rocco Pietrantonio	–	Carla	Carla	Carla	Carla	Evicted (Day 22)			
Riccardo Sardonè	–	Barbara	Marianne	Carla	Carla	Evicted (Day 22)			
Carla Velli	–	Rocco	Marianne	Rocco	Rocco	Evicted (Day 22)			
Fabrizio Corona	–	Morena	Riccardo	Morena	Evicted (Day 15)				
Giovanna Rei	–	–	Evicted (Day 8)						
Marina Ripa di Meana	–	Giovanna	Walked						
Daniela Martani	–	Evicted (Day 1)							
Nominated	Daniela; Giovanna	Giovanna; Barbara	Fake Eviction	Fabrizio; Carla; Rocco	Carla; Morena	Linda; Barbara	Ciro; Lory; Barbara	Morena; Ciro	
Evicted	Daniela Martani; 75%	Giovanna Rei; 74%	–	Fabrizio Corona; 56%	Carla Velli; 63%	Linda Batista; 72%	Barbara Guerra; 61%	Ciro Petrone; 67%	
