= La gorilla =

- Directed by: Romolo Guerrieri
- Written by: Romolo Guerrieri; Franco Mercuri
- Story by: Francesco Merli
- Starring: Lory Del Santo
- Cinematography: Roberto Girometti
- Music by: Fabio Frizzi
- Release date: 1982
- Running time: 103 minutes
- Language: Italian

La gorilla ("The female bodyguard") is a 1982 Italian comedy film directed by Romolo Guerrieri.

== Plot ==
Misadventure follows the bodyguard Ruby, a muscular girl in love with a shy designer in spite of her father, the owner of the security agency Securitas, who wants her married to a more rich and important suitor.

== Cast ==
- Lory Del Santo as Ruby
- Gianfranco D'Angelo as Ruby's father
- Tullio Solenghi as Adelmo Spallanzani
- Giorgio Bracardi as Professor Marcellini / Professor Aristide Pollastrini
- Ugo Fangareggi as Macrò

== See also ==
- List of Italian films of 1982
