= Elena Barolo =

Italian actress, showgirl and blogger

- Born: 14 December 1982 (age 43); Turin
- Occupation: television presenter
- Modeling information
- Height: 1.75 m (5 ft 9 in)
- Hair color: Blonde
- Eye color: Green

Elena Barolo (born 14 December 1982, in Turin) is an Italian actress, showgirl and blogger.

In 2002, Barolo began appearing as one of the veline on the Italian television program Striscia la notizia. Barolo appeared in this role alongside Giorgia Palmas until 2004. Barolo then developed a career as an actress, appearing as a main cast member in the soap opera CentoVetrine from 2005 to 2007, and again in the sitcom series 7 vite in 2007 and 2009. In 2011, she appeared in the feature films Ex - Amici come prima! and Un Natale per due.

In January 2012, Barolo started a fashion blog called "Affashionate".

== Filmography ==
=== Cinema ===
Year	Film	Role	Other notes
2005-2007	CentoVetrine	Vittoria Della Rocca	
2007	7 vite	Laura Ferrari	
2008	Tutti pazzi per amore	Vanessa	
2009	Terapia d'urgenza	El	
2009	7 vite 2	Laura Ferrari	
2009	Don Matteo 7	Laura Serafini	
2009	the restaurant		
2011	Ex 2: Still Friends?	Esther	Directed by Carlo Vanzina
2011	Un Natale per due	Giulia	

=== Television ===
Year	Film	Role	Other notes
2002-04	Striscia la notizia	Velina bionda	
2004	Lucignolo - Bellavita		
2004	Miss Universo Italia		
2004	Agrigento, la valle dei tempi		
2004	Meteo 4		
2004	Le festival de la comédie		
2004	Sipario estate		
2005	Topo Gigio		
2010	Festival internazionale del Tango		
2011	Striscia la Notizia	sent	
2015	Donnavventura	fashion blogger	
