= Buona giornata =

- Film poster
- Directed by: Carlo Vanzina
- Written by: Carlo Vanzina; Enrico Vanzina
- Starring: Diego Abatantuono; Lino Banfi; Teresa Mannino; Maurizio Mattioli; Vincenzo Salemme; Christian De Sica
- Edited by: Raimondo Crociani
- Music by: Manuel De Sica
- Release date: 30 March 2012
- Running time: 88 minutes
- Country: Italy
- Language: Italian

Buona giornata (lit. 'Good day') is a 2012 Italian comedy film directed by Carlo Vanzina.

== Cast ==
- Diego Abatantuono as Romeo Telleschi
- Lino Banfi as Senator Leonardo Lo Bianco
- Teresa Mannino as Rosaria Miccichè
- Maurizio Mattioli as Alberto Dominici
- Vincenzo Salemme as Luigi Pinardi
- Christian De Sica as Prince Ascanio Cavallini Gaetani
- Paolo Conticini as Cecco
- Chiara Francini as Chiara
- Tosca D'Aquino as Marisa
- Gabriele Cirilli as Settimio
- Antonio Stornaiolo as Nicola
- Valentina Persia as Patrizia Gallozzi
- Alessandro Bressanello as Zonin
- Giorgia Trasselli as Luciana, Alberto's wife
- Remo Remotti as Furio Bastianelli
- Fabrizio Frizzi as himself
