= La fidanzata di papà =

- Directed by: Enrico Oldoini
- Written by: Paolo Costella; Enrico Oldoini
- Starring: Massimo Boldi; Simona Ventura; Enzo Salvi; Biagio Izzo; Loredana De Nardis; Martina Pinto; Elisabetta Canalis; Teresa Mannino; Davide Silvestri; Nino Frassica
- Cinematography: Gianlorenzo Battaglia
- Edited by: Mauro Bonanni
- Music by: Alessandro Molinari
- Distributed by: Medusa Film
- Release date: 14 November 2008
- Running time: 96 minutes
- Country: Italy
- Language: Italian
- Box office: $9,471,031

La fidanzata di papà (lit. 'Dad's girlfriend') is a 2008 Italian comedy film directed by Enrico Oldoini. This film marks the first major acting role of Italian television presenter Simona Ventura.

== Cast ==
- Massimo Boldi as Massimo Bondi
- Simona Ventura as Angela Vandelli
- Enzo Salvi as Eros Bondi
- Biagio Izzo as Mario / Maria
- Loredana De Nardis as Lara Bondi
- Martina Pinto as Barbara
- Elisabetta Canalis as Felicity
- Fichi d'India as the policemen
- Teresa Mannino as Luminosa
- Davide Silvestri as Matteo Bondi
- Aurora Quattrocchi as Carmelina
- Natalia Bush as Gloria
- Alessandra Barzaghi as Jenny
- Nino Frassica as Nino
