= Pietro Torrisi =

Italian stuntman and actor

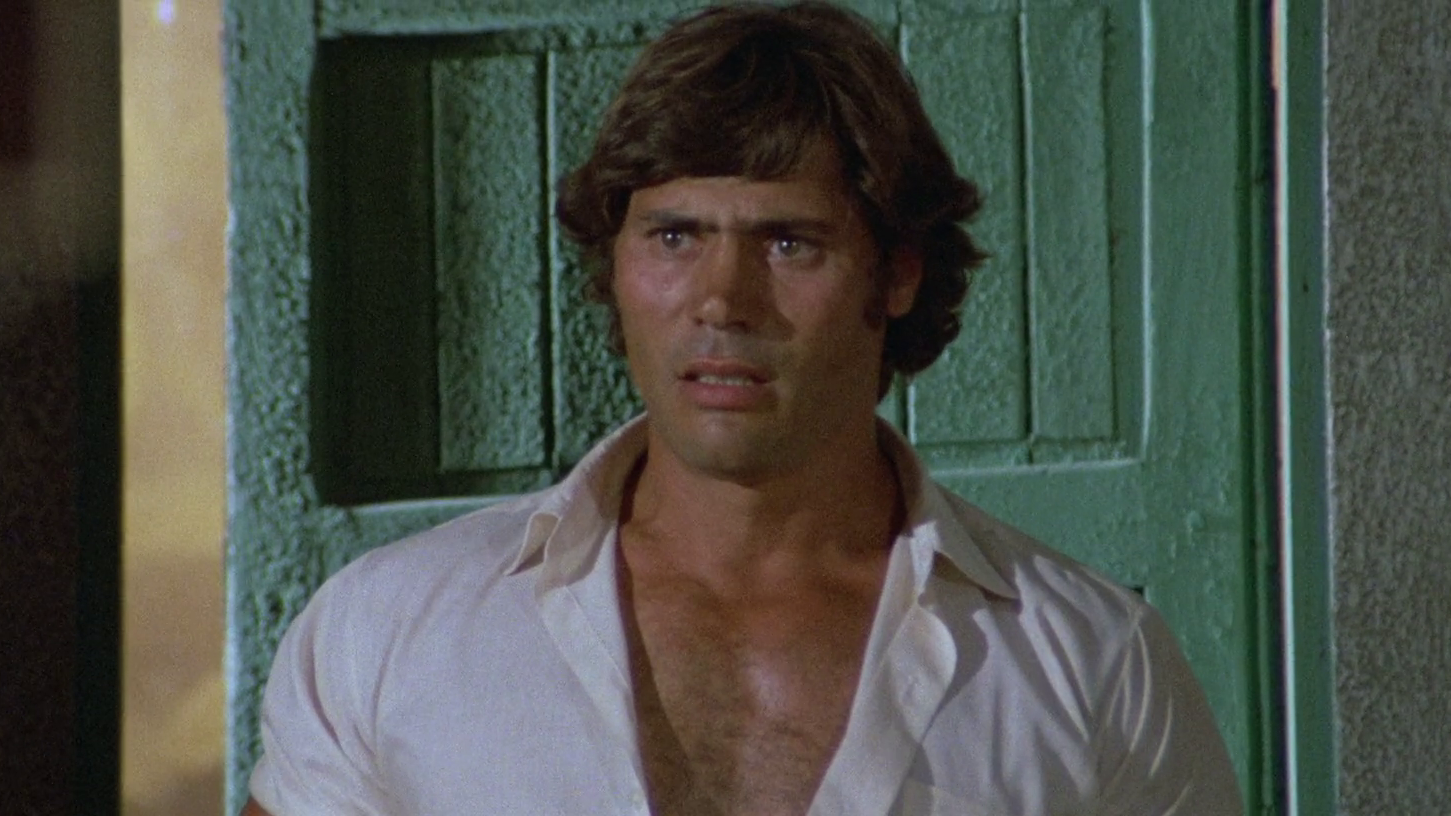
- Pietro Torrisi in 1974.
- Born: 20 January 1940 (age 86); Catania, Italy
- Occupations: Actor; adult actor
- Years active: 1960-present

Pietro Torrisi (born 20 January 1940), also known as Peter McCoy, is an Italian stuntman and actor who appeared in more than 100 films since 1960 and in some pornographic films as performer.

== Selected filmography ==
Year	Title	Role	Notes
1963	The Ten Gladiators		
1964	Hercules and the Tyrants of Babylon		
1967	The Witches		
1969	...e vennero in quattro per uccidere Sartana!		
1970	Paths of War		
1971	Vengeance Is a Dish Served Cold		
1971	Nights and Loves of Don Juan		
1972	Long Arm of the Godfather		
1972	Two Sons of Trinity		
1973	Heroes in Hell		
1973	Death Smiles at a Murderer		
1975	A Genius, Two Partners and a Dupe		
1975	Return of Shanghai Joe		
1976	Werewolf Woman		
1976	Black Emanuelle 2		
1982	Gunan, King of the Barbarians	Zukahn/Gunan	
1983	The Sword of the Barbarians		
1983	The Throne of Fire	Siegried	
