= Daughter of the Jungle (1982 film) =

1982 film by Umberto Lenzi

- Directed by: Umberto Lenzi
- Written by: Giovanni Lombardo Radice; Marina Garroni
- Starring: Sabrina Siani
- Cinematography: Giovanni Bergamini
- Edited by: Vincenzo Tomassi
- Music by: Roberto Donati
- Release date: 1982
- Language: Italian

Daughter of the Jungle (Italian: Incontro nell'ultimo paradiso/ Encounter in the Last Paradise) is a 1982 Italian romantic adventure film directed by Umberto Lenzi and starring Sabrina Siani.

== Plot ==
Ringo and Butch, young Americans who intend to explore a forest in Africa, rent a boat and venture out on a large river. Lost their way, after ending up in a rapid, they are captured by a tribe of indigenous people, who are then attacked by some adventurers in search of rubies. Ringo and Butch escape a net trap with help from Luana, a jungle girl in a primitive g-string bikini and primitive sandals who grew up in the jungle since she was a child. Ringo then finds an old, half-destroyed helicopter, which belonged to the Wilsons with Ringo identifying Luana as their missing daughter Susan Wilson. Ringo manages to repair it. Helped the natives to chase away the violent adventurers, they leave for the United States together with Susan, with whom Butch has fallen in love, with the rubies stolen from the criminals.

== Cast ==
- Sabrina Siani as Luana/Susan Wilson
- Rodolfo Bigotti as Ringo
- Renato Miracco as Butch
- Sal Borgese as Dupré
- Mario Pedone

== See also ==
- List of Italian films of 1982
