= Blue Island (1982 film) =

1982 film by Enzo Doria, Luigi Russo

- Directed by: Enzo Doria; Luigi Russo
- Written by: Enzo Doria; Dardano Sacchetti
- Starring: Fabio Meyer; Mario Pedone; Sabrina Siani
- Release date: 1982
- Running time: 92 minutes
- Country: Italy
- Language: English

Blue Island (Italian title Due gocce d'acqua salata) is a 1982 film directed by Luigi Russo (under the pseudonym John Wilder) and Enzo Doria, who also co-wrote the screenplay with Dardano Sacchetti. Filmed in the Seychelles, it stars Fabio Meyer, Mario Pedone and Sabrina Siani. Like the film Paradise of the same year, it was inspired by the success of the 1980 release The Blue Lagoon.

== Premise ==
After an airliner crashes over the ocean, two young passengers, Bonnie (Siani) and Billy (Meyer), meet in an inflatable life raft. Apparently the only survivors, they make it to a tropical island, but soon learn that they are not entirely alone.
