= Gunan, King of the Barbarians =

1982 film

- Directed by: Franco Prosperi
- Screenplay by: Piero Regnoli
- Story by: Piero Regnoli
- Produced by: Pino Buricchi
- Starring: Pietro Torrisi; Malisa Longo; Giovanni Ciangriglia; Emilio Messina; Rita Silva
- Cinematography: Pasquale Fanetti
- Music by: Roberto Pregadio
- Production company: Leader Films
- Release date: 9 September 1982 (Italy)
- Running time: 80 minutes

Gunan, King of the Barbarians (Italian: Gunan il guerriero), aka The Invincible Barbarian is a 1982 film directed by Franco Prosperi.

== Production ==
Gunan, King of the Barbarians uses footage from One Million Years B.C..

== Release ==
Gunan, King of the Barbarians was released in Italy on 9 September 1982. The film has also been released as The Invincible Barbarian.

As of 2016 the only available copies of Gunan, King of the Barbarians were home made DVDs sold on eBay that are sourced from pan-and-scan transfers from VHS tapes.

== Reception ==
Colin Greenland reviewed The Invincible Barbarian for Imagine magazine, and stated that "What makes this Invincible Barbarian invincible? Probably the fact that everybody he comes up against is even more stupid than he is. See how long you can watch this one without giggling."

From retrospective reviews, the German book Lexicon des Fantasy-Films referred to the film as a rip-off of Conan the Barbarian but "only dumber".
