= Michela Miti =

Italian actress and television presenter

- Born: Michela Macaluso; 12 June 1963 (age 62); Rome, Italy
- Height: 1.70 m (5 ft 7 in)
- Partner: Alberto Bevilacqua

Michela Miti (born Michela Macaluso; born 12 June 1963) is an Italian actress and television presenter.

== Life ==
From 1979 to 1980, Miti hosted the Italian children's television show 3, 2, 1... contatto!

Miti became known for her nude appearances in commedia sexy all'italiana. She acted in films along with Alvaro Vitali and Renzo Montagnani. Miti also appeared on the cover of adult magazines such as Playmen and Blitz.

She considers herself Roman Catholic.

== Filmography ==
- Gialloparma (1999) as Franca Gherardi
- Mortacci (1989) as Bartender
- Delitti (1987)
- Dolce pelle di Angela (1986) as Angela
- Sogni e bisogni (1985 TV miniseries) as the Seducer
- I racconti del maresciallo (1984 TV series) as Luisiana Moser in the episode "The white poodle dog"
- Questo e quello (1983) as Girlfriend of Giulio
- Vieni avanti cretino (1982) directed by Luciano Salce as Carmela
- Biancaneve & Co. (1982) as Snowhite
- W la foca (1982) as Marisa
- Pierino Strikes Again (1982) as the Teacher
- I figli... so' pezzi 'e core (1981) as Mariastella
- Pierino contro tutti (1981) La Supplente
- Cream Horn (1981)
