= W la foca =

1982 film by Nando Cicero

- Directed by: Nando Cicero
- Written by: Nando Cicero; Francesco Milizia; Stefano Sudriè
- Produced by: Galliano Juso
- Starring: Lory Del Santo; Michela Miti; Riccardo Billi; Bombolo; Dagmar Lassander
- Cinematography: Giorgio Di Battista
- Edited by: Daniele Alabiso
- Music by: Detto Mariano
- Release date: 1982
- Country: Italy
- Language: Italian

W la foca is a 1982 commedia sexy all'italiana directed by Nando Cicero.

== Plot ==
Andrea is a young and naïve nurse from Veneto who is employed by the Roman physician Dr. Filippo Patacchiola. Patacchiola lives with his nymphomaniac wife, raunchy daughter Marisa, senile father, intellectually disabled son Paolo, and African maid Domenica who Patacchiola wants to use as a "manmaker" for his son. The inevitable cycle of misunderstandings, couple exchange, and sexual seductions gets even more complicated when Andrea's lover Michele arrives in Rome to see Andrea.

== Cast ==
- Lory Del Santo as Andrea
- Michela Miti as Marisa Patacchiola
- Riccardo Billi as the Grandfather
- Bombolo as Dr. Filippo Patacchiola
- Dagmar Lassander as Signora Patacchiola
- Fabio Grossi as Paolo Patacchiola
- Anna Fall as Domenica
- Carlo Marini as Michele
- Victor Cavallo as painter
- Franco Bracardi as tramp
- Enzo Andronico as exhibitionist
- Moana Pozzi as girl on the train

== Production ==
The film was shot in Rome, between EUR and Elios studios.

== Release ==
The film was released on 4 March 1982. In 2004, it was restored and shown as part of the retrospective "Storia Segreta del Cinema Italiano: Italian Kings of the Bs" at the 61st Venice International Film Festival.

== See also ==
- List of Italian films of 1982
