= Franco Prosperi =

Italian film director (1926–2004)

- Born: Francesco Prosperi; 2 September 1926; Rome, Kingdom of Italy
- Died: 17 October 2004 (aged 78); Rome, Italy
- Other name: Frank Shannon
- Occupations: Film director, screenwriter

Franco Prosperi (2 September 1926 – 17 October 2004) was an Italian film director and screenwriter, active between the mid-1960s and the early 1980s.

== Career ==
Born in Rome, Prosperi began his career as an assistant director with Mario Bava and with whom he also wrote several screenplays. In 1966, he made his directorial debut, credited as Frank Shannon, with the thriller film, Tecnica di un omicidio and over the years, he built a solid reputation as a director of crime-action films. He also occasionally directed comedies (with Lando Buzzanca or Alighiero Noschese) and, in the final stage of his career, at the beginning of the 1980s, several low-budget sword and sorcery films.

== Selected filmography ==
- Tecnica di un omicidio (1966)
- Hired Killer (1966)
- Every Man Is My Enemy (1967)
- Ripped Off (1971)
- The Funny Face of the Godfather (1973) (parody of The Godfather)
- Unbelievable Adventures of Italians in Russia (1974)
- Meet Him and Die (1976)
- The Last House on the Beach (1978)
- Deadly Chase (1978)
- Gunan, King of the Barbarians (1982) (parody of Conan the Barbarian)
- The Throne of Fire (1983)
