= Lory Del Santo =

Italian actress, model and television personality (born 1958)

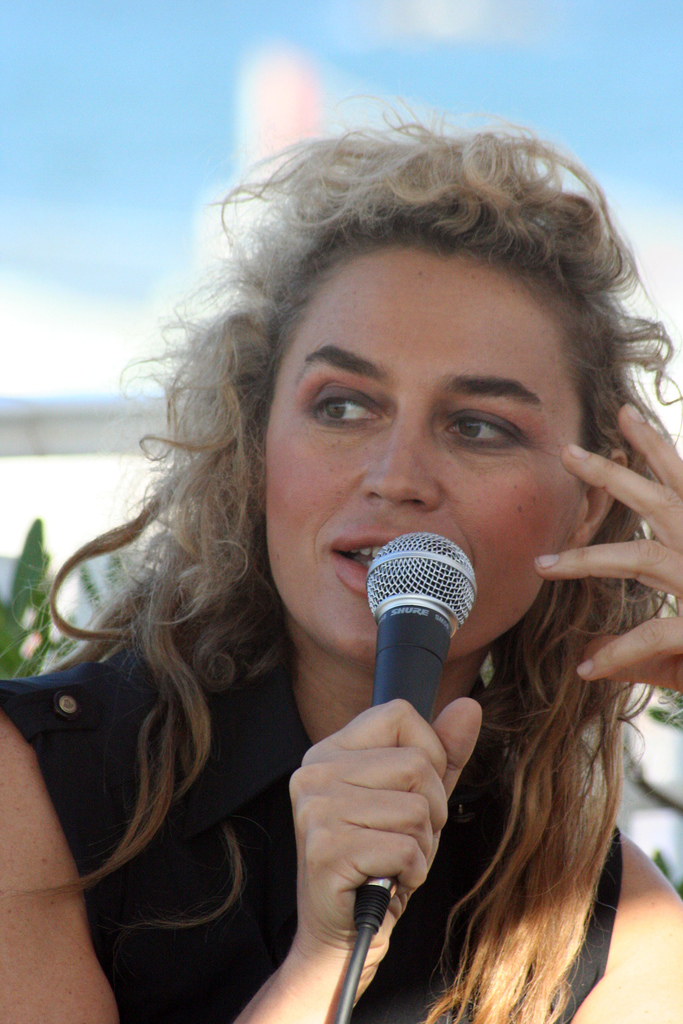
Lory Del Santo in 2007 in Milan

Loredana "Lory" Del Santo (born 28 September 1958) is an Italian actress, model and beauty pageant titleholder.

== Life and career ==
Born in Povegliano Veronese, Del Santo started her career as a valletta (presenter's assistant) in the 1975 edition of Festivalbar. In the late-1970s, she got her first film roles, mainly in sexy comedy films, and in 1980 she represented Italy at the Miss Universe competition. In the early-1980s, Del Santo became popular thanks to her participation in successful TV shows such as Antonio Ricci's Drive In and Renzo Arbore's Tagli, ritagli e frattaglie.

Del Santo was a focus of gossip columns, mainly for her relationship with Eric Clapton (who dedicated the song "Lady of Verona" to her). While he was still married to Pattie Boyd, Clapton fathered a son with Lory, Conor, who was born on 21 August 1986. Conor died on 20 March 1991, at the age of four and a half, when he fell out of an open bedroom window on the 53rd floor of the Galleria apartment building in Manhattan. The death of their son was the inspiration for Clapton's songs, "Tears in Heaven" and "Circus".

Starting from early 2000s, Del Santo has taken part in several Italian reality shows, winning the third season of L'isola dei famosi. In 2006, she wrote an autobiography, Piacere è una sfida.

In 2014, she released The Lady on her YouTube channel, a series known for its amateurish acting.

== Filmography ==
=== Films ===
Year	Title	Role(s)	Notes
1977	Ecco noi per esempio	Girl at disco	Uncredited
1978	Where Are You Going on Holiday?	Luisa	Segment: "Sarò tutta per te"
1978	Geppo il folle	Female student	Uncredited
1979	Dear Father	Party guest	Cameo appearance
1979	Gardenia	Laura	
1979	Where Can You Go Without the Little Vice?	Irma	
1979	Passione amore servizio completo	Lucy	
1979	Saturday, Sunday and Friday	Baby	Segment: "Saturday"
1979	The Great Alligator River	Jane	
1979	The Finzi Detective Agency	Pierpaola Moser	
1979	A Dangerous Toy	Girl at restaurant	Uncredited
1980	I'm Photogenic	Loredana	
1980	Desideria	Naisse	
1980	Sunday Lovers	Lory	Segment: "Roma"
1981	L'onorevole con l'amante sotto il letto	Battistoni's waitress	
1981	Bollenti spiriti	Lily	
1982	W la foca	Andrea	
1982	La gorilla	Ruby	
1983	"FF.SS." – Cioè: "...che mi hai portato a fare sopra a Posillipo se non mi vuoi più bene?"	Herself	Cameo appearance
1985	La donna giusta	Woman in Rome	Uncredited
2006	Vita Smeralda	Herself	Cameo appearance
2013	The Night Club	None	Short film; director

=== Television ===
Year	Title	Role(s)	Notes
1975	Festivalbar 1975	Herself / Co-host	Annual music festival
1980	Miss Universe 1980	Herself / Contestant	Beauty contest
1981	Tagli, ritagli e frattaglie	Herself / Co-host	Variety show
1982	Morto Troisi, viva Troisi!	Herself	Television film
1983–1988	Drive In	Various	Sketch comedy
2000	Ciao Darwin	Herself / Contestant	Game show (season 3)
2005	L'isola dei famosi	Herself / Contestant	Reality show (season 3)
2006	L'isola dei famosi	Herself / Opinionist	Reality show (season 4)
2006	Saturday Night Live from Milano	Herself / Host	Episode: "Lory Del Santo"
2009	La Fattoria	Herself / Contestant	Reality show (season 4)
2010–2011	Missione seduzione	Herself / Host	Docu-reality
2014–2015	My Bodyguard	Herself / Judge	Reality show
2014–2017	The Lady	None	Creator, director and writer; 37 episodes
2014–2023	Pomeriggio Cinque	Herself / Opinionist	Talk show
2016	Pechino Express	Herself / Contestant	Reality show (season 5)
2017–2021	Domenica Live	Herself / Opinionist	Talk show
2018	Grande Fratello VIP	Herself / Contestant	Reality show (season 3)
