= List of Italian actors =

This is a list of male actors from Italy, which generally includes those who have resided in Italy or have largely appeared in Italian film productions. This list includes all actors from Category:Italian male actors.

Persons are listed alphabetically by surname.

== A ==
- Michele Abruzzo
- Stefano Accorsi
- Antonio Acqua
- Giuseppe Addobbati
- Gianni Agus
- Antonio Albanese
- Giorgio Albertazzi
- Gigio Alberti
- Guido Alberti
- Giampiero Albertini
- Aldo, Giovanni & Giacomo
- Antonio Allocca
- Ernesto Almirante
- Luigi Almirante
- Roberto Alpi
- Tullio Altamura
- Gerardo Amato
- Claudio Amendola
- Ferruccio Amendola
- Pino Ammendola
- Giuseppe Anatrelli
- Felice Andreasi
- Oscar Andriani
- Enzo Andronico
- Nando Angelini
- Franco Angrisano
- Gaius Ummidius Actius Anicetus
- Corrado Annicelli
- Gabriele Antonini
- Omero Antonutti
- Renzo Arbore
- Giorgio Ardisson
- Lello Arena
- Maurizio Arena
- Henry Armetta
- Andrea Aureli

== B ==
- Salvatore Baccaro
- Don Backy
- Giancarlo Badessi
- Carlo Bagno
- Silvio Bagolini
- Ennio Balbo
- Raf Baldassarre
- Renato Baldini
- Franco Balducci
- Gigi Ballista
- Ignazio Balsamo
- Lino Banfi
- Luca Barbareschi
- Urbano Barberini
- Ciccio Barbi
- Guglielmo Barnabò
- Gianfranco Barra
- Giovanni Barrella
- Cesco Baseggio
- Rick Battaglia
- Gino Bechi
- Memo Benassi
- Carmelo Bene
- Roberto Benigni
- Francesco Benigno
- Galeazzo Benti
- Fabrizio Bentivoglio
- Alessandro Benvenuti
- Nerio Bernardi
- Toni Bertorelli
- Calisto Bertramo
- Ughetto Bertucci
- Enrico Beruschi
- Nino Besozzi
- Cesare Bettarini
- Giorgio Bianchi
- Roberto Bianchi
- Tino Bianchi
- Claudio Bigagli
- Oreste Bilancia
- Enzo Biliotti
- Riccardo Billi
- Roberto Bisacco
- Peppo Biscarini
- Claudio Bisio
- Gildo Bocci
- Federico Boido
- Massimo Boldi
- Ugo Bologna
- Bombolo
- Paolo Bonacelli
- Gianni Bonagura
- Massimo Bonetti
- Mike Bongiorno
- Alessio Boni
- Mario Bonnard
- Luigi Bonos
- Alberto Bonucci
- Sal Borgese
- Gianfabio Bosco, in arte Gian
- Giulio Bosetti
- Andrea Bosic
- Raoul Bova
- Franco Bracardi
- Giorgio Bracardi
- Arturo Bragaglia
- Andrea Brambilla, in arte Zuzzurro
- Gino Bramieri
- Armando Brancia
- Rossano Brazzi
- Mario Brega
- Fabrizio Brienza
- Enrico Brignano
- Paolo Briguglia
- Giulio Brogi
- Nando Bruno
- Tino Buazzelli
- Flavio Bucci
- Carlo Buccirosso
- Aldo Bufi Landi
- Luigi Maria Burruano
- Fred Buscaglione
- Gino Buzzanca
- Lando Buzzanca

== C ==
- Jerry Calà
- Giulio Calì
- Ernesto Calindri
- Romano Calò
- Carlo Campanini
- Stelio Candelli
- Enzo Cannavale
- Antonio Cantafora
- Giorgio Cantarini
- Lino Capolicchio
- Alberto Capozzi
- Pier Paolo Capponi
- Vittorio Caprioli
- Fabrizio Capucci
- Franco Caracciolo
- Ida Carloni Talli
- Paolo Carlini
- Pietro Carloni
- Siro Carme
- Tullio Carminati
- Piero Carnabuci
- Francesco Carnelutti
- Primo Carnera
- Mario Carotenuto
- Memmo Carotenuto
- Renato Carpentieri
- Tino Carraro
- Albano Carrisi
- Pino Caruso
- Antonio Casagrande
- Maurizio Casagrande
- Salvatore Cascio
- Maria Caserini
- Tino Caspanello
- Claudio Cassinelli
- Mario Castellani
- Sergio Castellitto
- Nino Castelnuovo
- Antonio Catania
- Luciano Catenacci
- Gino Cavalieri
- Victor Cavallo
- Gianni Cavina
- Massimo Ceccherini
- Carlo Cecchi
- Giuseppe Cederna
- Guido Celano
- Adriano Celentano
- Adolfo Celi
- Antonio Centa
- Ennio Cerlesi
- Enzo Cerusico
- Gino Cervi
- Ugo Ceseri
- Renato Cestiè
- Andrea Checchi
- Renato Chiantoni
- Walter Chiari
- Renato Cialente
- Giovanni Cianfriglia
- Sergio Ciani
- Eduardo Ciannelli
- Nando Cicero
- Antonio Cifariello
- Emilio Cigoli
- Luigi Cimara
- Tano Cimarosa
- Bruno Cirino
- Natale Cirino
- Roberto Citran
- Franco Citti
- Giancarlo Cobelli
- Pino Colizzi
- Ernesto Colli
- Alberto Collo
- Vittorio Congia
- Ugo Conti
- Franco Coop
- Bruno Corazzari
- Bruno Corelli
- Leonardo Cortese
- Romolo Costa
- Edoardo Costa
- Lorenzo Crespi
- Vasco Creti
- Erno Crisa
- Nino Crisman
- Olinto Cristina
- Carlo Croccolo
- Vincenzo Crocitti
- Elio Crovetto
- Riccardo Cucciolla
- Francesco Cura
- Alessandro Cutolo

== D ==
- Domiziano Arcangeli
- Diego Abatantuono
- Ugo D'Alessio
- Lucio Dalla
- Maurizio D'Ancora
- Carlo D'Angelo
- Gianfranco D'Angelo
- Guido Marini
- Nino D'Angelo
- Cesare Danova
- Carlo Dapporto
- Massimo Dapporto
- Rocco D'Assunta
- Ninetto Davoli
- Luciano De Ambrosis
- Renato De Carmine
- Eduardo De Filippo
- Luca De Filippo
- Luigi De Filippo
- Peppino De Filippo
- Gianni Dei
- Roberto Della Casa
- Carlo Delle Piane
- Duilio Del Prete
- Pupo De Luca
- Giorgio De Lullo
- Carlo De Mejo
- Christian De Sica
- Vittorio De Sica
- Angelo Dessy
- Pietro De Vico
- Luigi Diberti
- Mauro Di Francesco
- Franco Diogene
- Gioele Dix
- Ignazio Dolce
- Arturo Dominici
- Giulio Donadio
- Maurizio Donadoni
- Giulio Donnini
- Johnny Dorelli
- Mino Doro
- Umberto D'Orsi
- Attilio Dottesio
- Giustino Durano
- Checco Durante
- Carlo Duse
- Eugenio Duse
- Vittorio Duse
- Danny DeVito

== E ==
- George Eastman
- Salvatore Esposito

== F ==
- Antonino Faà Di Bruno
- Aldo Fabrizi
- Armando Falconi
- Ugo Fangareggi
- Franco Fantasia
- Ennio Fantastichini
- Cesare Fantoni
- Franco Fabrizi
- Francesco D'Adda
- Ferruccio De Ceresa
- Sergio Fantoni
- Alberto Farnese
- Antonello Fassari
- Mario Feliciani
- Riccardo Farscari
- Pino Ferrara
- Mario Ferrari
- Paolo Ferrari
- Carlo Ferreri
- Maurizio Ferrini
- Turi Ferro
- Gabriele Ferzetti
- Salvatore Ficarra
- Enzo Fiermonte
- Aurelio Fierro
- Nunzio Filogamo
- Aldo Fiorelli
- Beppe Fiorello
- Rosario Fiorello
- Fiorenzo Fiorentini
- Colin Firth
- Dario Fo
- Arnoldo Foà
- Daniele Formica
- Franco Franchi
- Armando Francioli
- Pippo Franco
- Nino Frassica
- Leopoldo Fregoli
- Giovanni Frezza
- Giacomo Furia

== G ==
- Giorgio Gaber
- Carlo Gaddi
- Corrado Gaipa
- Michele Gammino
- Antonio Gandusio
- Enzo Garinei
- Gabriel Garko
- Gianni Garko
- Ivo Garrani
- Riccardo Garrone
- Franco Gasparri
- Alessandro Gassman
- Vittorio Gassman
- Lauro Gazzolo
- Nando Gazzolo
- Giuliano Gemma
- Piero Gerlini
- Pietro Germi
- Sandro Ghiani
- Massimo Ghini
- Emilio Ghione
- Pietro Ghislandi
- Fosco Giachetti
- Gianfranco Giachetti
- Franco Giacobini
- Adriano Giannini
- Giancarlo Giannini
- Fabrizio Gifuni
- Beniamino Gigli
- Andrea Giordana
- Renzo Giovampietro
- Enio Girolami
- Remo Girone
- Massimo Girotti
- Aldo Giuffrè
- Carlo Giuffrè
- Carlo Giustini
- Loris Gizzi
- Enrico Glori
- Gene Gnocchi
- Tito Gobbi
- Francesco Golisano
- Claudio Gora
- Gilberto Govi
- Raoul Grassilli
- Giovanni Grasso
- Paolo Graziosi
- Ezio Greggio
- Beppe Grillo
- Orso Maria Guerrini
- Marco Guglielmi
- Leo Gullotta

== H ==
- Alessandro Haber
- Paolo Hendel
- Roberto Herlitzka
- Terence Hill
- Carlo Hintermann

== I ==
- Angelo Infanti
- Ciccio Ingrassia
- Flavio Insinna
- Franco Interlenghi

== L ==
- Gabriele Lavia
- Ubaldo Lay
- Marco Leonardi
- Ignazio Leone
- Guido Leontini
- Gino Leurini
- Enzo Liberti
- Alberto Lionello
- Oreste Lionello
- Daniele Liotti
- Giampiero Littera
- Virna Lisi
- Little Tony
- Luigi Lo Cascio
- Gina Lollobrigida
- Guido Lollobrigida
- Carlo Lombardi
- Germano Longo
- Sophia Loren
- Livio Lorenzon
- Ray Lovelock
- Enrico Lo Verso
- Folco Lulli
- Piero Lulli
- Luca Luongo
- Andy Luotto
- Roldano Lupi
- Alberto Lupo
- Daniele Luttazzi
- Lelio Luttazzi
- Enrico Luzi

== M ==
- Erminio Macario
- Valentino Macchi
- Aldo Maccione
- Stefano Madia
- Beniamino Maggio
- Dante Maggio
- Enzo Maggio
- Lamberto Maggiorani
- Achille Majeroni
- Michele Malaspina
- Renato Malavasi
- Paolo Malco
- Nicola Maldacea
- Nino Manfredi
- Leonard Mann
- Guido Mannari
- Ettore Manni
- Mario Maranzana
- Nino Marchesini
- Giulio Marchetti
- Nino Marchetti
- Saverio Marconi
- Renzo Marignano
- Luca Marinelli
- Peter Martell
- Alfredo Martinelli
- Marino Masé
- Valerio Mastandrea
- Leopoldo Mastelloni
- Marcello Mastroianni
- Maurizio Mattioli
- Glauco Mauri
- Roberto Mauri
- Mario Mazza
- Carlo Mazzarella
- Piero Mazzarella
- Umberto Melnati
- Ricky Memphis
- Furio Meniconi
- Adalberto Maria Merli
- Franco Merli
- Maurizio Merli
- Mario Merola
- Marco Messeri
- Geronimo Meynier
- Vittorio Mezzogiorno
- Maurizio Micheli
- Carlo Micheluzzi
- Armando Migliari
- Tomás Milián
- Camillo Milli
- Achille Millo
- Gianni Minervini
- Riccardo Miniggio, in arte Ric
- Felice Minotti
- Tiberio Mitri
- Domenico Modugno
- Massimo Mollica
- Alessandro Momo
- Carlo Monni
- Renzo Montagnani
- Renato Montalbano
- Enrico Montesano
- Luigi Montini
- Gianni Morandi
- Michele Morrone
- Nanni Moretti
- Gastone Moschin
- Silvio Muccino
- Francesco Mulé
- Tiberio Murgia
- Paul Müller
- Roberto Murolo
- Angelo Musco
- Vincenzo Musolino
- Tuccio Musumeci
- Gianni Musy Glori

== N ==
- Piero Natoli
- Amedeo Nazzari
- Franco Nero
- Claudio Nicastro
- Guido Nicheli
- Maurizio Nichetti
- Aldo Nicodemi
- Carlo Ninchi
- Alighiero Noschese
- Guido Notari
- Silvio Noto
- Nick Novecento
- Mario Novelli
- Ermete Novelli
- Novello Novelli
- Francesco Nuti

== O ==
- Andrea Occhipinti
- Egisto Olivieri
- Corrado Olmi
- Glauco Onorato
- Orazio Orlando
- Silvio Orlando
- Umberto Orsini

== P ==
- Bartolomeo Pagano
- Ugo Pagliai
- Marcello Pagliero
- Eros Pagni
- Mimmo Palmara
- Renzo Palmer
- Giuseppe Pambieri
- Giorgio Panariello
- Elio Pandolfi
- Turi Pandolfini
- Paolo Panelli
- Corrado Pani
- Francesco Paolantoni
- Marco Paolini
- Nando Paone
- Rocco Papaleo
- Adriano Pappalardo
- Giulio Paradisi
- Ruggero Pasquarelli
- Giorgio Pasotti
- Piero Pastore
- Livio Pavanelli
- Luigi Pavese
- Nino Pavese
- Nello Pazzafini
- Alfredo Pea
- Biagio Pelligra
- Vincenzo Peluso
- Nico Pepe
- Memé Perlini
- Alfonso Perugini
- Franco Pesce
- Gastone Pescucci
- Mario Petri
- Luigi Petrucci
- Lorenzo Piani
- Tina Pica
- Lamberto Picasso
- Valentino Picone
- Leonardo Pieraccioni
- Antonio Pierfederici
- Marina Pierro
- Luciano Pigozzi
- Camillo Pilotto
- Ezio Pinza
- Carlo Pisacane
- Luigi Pistilli
- Nicola Pistoia
- Mario Pisu
- Raffaele Pisu
- Michele Placido
- Cesare Polacco
- Afro Poli
- Paolo Poli
- Cochi Ponzoni
- Giuseppe Porelli
- Renato Pozzetto
- Giancarlo Prete
- Andrea Prodan
- Gigi Proietti
- Aldo Puglisi
- Romano Puppo
- Alessandro Preziosi

== R ==
- Alberto Rabagliati
- Corrado Racca
- Umberto Raho
- Sergio Raimondi
- Ermanno Randi
- Salvo Randone
- Massimo Ranieri
- Renato Rascel
- Ivan Rassimov
- Isarco Ravaioli
- Rolando Ravello
- Gigi Reder
- Remo Remotti
- Tony Renis
- Teddy Reno
- Franco Ressel
- Michele Riccardini
- Renzo Ricci
- Virgilio Riento
- Mariano Rigillo
- Adriano Rimoldi
- Giuseppe Rinaldi
- David Riondino
- Roberto Risso
- Checco Rissone
- Mario Riva
- Alfredo Rizzo
- Giacomo Rizzo
- Gianni Rizzo
- Enzo Robutti
- Carlo Romano
- Andrea Roncato
- Giacomo Rondinella
- Stelvio Rosi
- Gian Paolo Rosmino
- Paolo Rossi
- Renato Rossini
- Giacomo Rossi Stuart
- Kim Rossi Stuart
- Ermanno Roveri
- Sergio Rubini
- Sandro Ruffini
- Ruggero Ruggeri

== S ==
- Antonio Sabàto, Jr.
- Umberto Sacripante
- Corso Salani
- Luciano Salce
- Vincenzo Salemme
- Enrico Maria Salerno
- Antonio Salines
- Renato Salvatori
- Francesco Salvi
- Guido Salvini
- Tommaso Salvini
- Riccardo Salvino
- Gigi Sammarchi
- Vittorio Sanipoli
- Gino Santercole
- Walter Santesso
- Mario Santonastaso
- Pippo Santonastaso
- Jacopo Sarno
- Paolo Sassanelli
- Ugo Sasso
- Stefano Satta Flores
- Gigi Savoia
- Giancarlo Sbragia
- Mattia Sbragia
- Mario Scaccia
- Franco Scandurra
- Renato Scarpa
- Giulio Scarpati
- Eduardo Scarpetta (born 1853)
- Eduardo Scarpetta (born 1993)
- Filippo Scelzo
- Tito Schipa
- Tino Schirinzi
- Bruno Scipioni
- Tino Scotti
- Massimo Serato
- Gustavo Serena
- Jacques Sernas
- Domenico Serra
- Luigi Serventi
- Toni Servillo
- Rocco Siffredi
- Mario Siletti
- Franco Silva
- Aldo Silvani
- Guglielmo Sinaz
- Vinicio Sofia
- Gianni Solaro
- Emilio Solfrizzi
- Paolo Solvay
- Fabio Sonzogni
- Alberto Sordi
- Alberto Sorrentino
- Odoardo Spadaro
- Umberto Spadaro
- Erminio Spalla
- Ignazio Spalla
- Bud Spencer
- Tony Sperandeo
- Franco Sportelli
- Luca Sportelli
- Carletto Sposito
- Ivano Staccioli
- Enzo Stajola
- Sylvester Stallone
- Pippo Starnazza
- Benito Stefanelli
- Anthony Steffen
- Elio Steiner
- Luciano Stella
- Paolo Stoppa

== T ==
- Ferruccio Tagliavini
- Luciano Tajoli
- Vincenzo Talarico
- Alberto Talegalli
- Carlo Tamberlani
- Nando Tamberlani
- Carlo Taranto
- Nino Taranto
- Gianrico Tedeschi
- Teo Teocoli
- Gianfranco Terrin
- Dante Testa
- Eugenio Testa
- Nino Terzo
- Fabio Testi
- Aroldo Tieri
- Gabriele Tinti
- Giorgio Tirabassi
- Sergio Tofano
- Lino Toffolo
- Achille Togliani
- Gianmarco Tognazzi
- Ricky Tognazzi
- Ugo Tognazzi
- Fausto Tommei
- Edoardo Toniolo
- Pietro Tordi
- Luigi Tosi
- Otello Toso
- Totò
- Fausto Tozzi
- Fabio Traversa
- Leopoldo Trieste
- Amedeo Trilli
- Massimo Troisi
- Marco Tulli
- Gualtiero Tumiati
- Enzo Turco

== U ==
- Toni Ucci
- Claudio Undari
- Saro Urzì

== V ==
- Osvaldo Valenti
- Rudolph Valentino
- Romolo Valli
- Raf Vallone
- Massimo Vanni
- Luigi Vannucchi
- Raimondo Van Riel
- Alfredo Varelli
- Daniele Vargas
- Vittorio Vaser
- Venantino Venantini
- Milo Ventimiglia
- Lino Ventura
- Massimo Venturiello
- Carlo Verdone
- Raimondo Vianello
- Enrico Viarisio
- Marco Vicario
- Piero Vida
- Domenico Viglione Borghese
- Claudio Villa
- Roberto Villa
- Paolo Villaggio
- Nino Vingelli
- Gino Viotti
- Alvaro Vitali
- Fabio Volo
- Gian Maria Volonté
- Franco Volpi

== W ==
- Massimo Wertmüller

== Z ==
- Ermete Zacconi
- Gero Zambuto
- Elio Zamuto
- Bruno Zanin
- Luca Zingaretti
- Cesare Zoppetti

== See also ==
- Lists of actors
- List of Italians
