= Nino Terzo =

Italian actor (1923–2005)

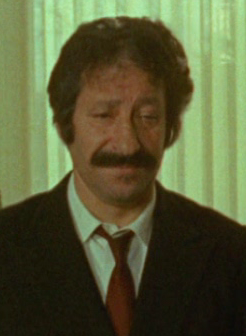
- Nino Terzo in Mezzanotte d'amore (1970)
- Born: 22 May 1923; Palermo, Kingdom of Italy
- Died: 8 May 2005 (aged 81); Marano di Napoli, Italy
- Occupation: Actor

Nino Terzo (22 May 1923 – 8 May 2005) was an Italian actor.

== Life and career ==
Born in Palermo as Antonino Terzo, he worked intensively in the avanspettacolo and revue theater, entering the stage companies of Totò, Peppino De Filippo, Franco and Ciccio, Domenico Modugno, among others. Terzo was also active as a singer, appearing in several operettas.

Terzo made his film debut in 1962, and he soon established himself as one of the most active character actors in the Italian comedy cinema, usually playing, with small variations, the character that made him famous in avanspettacolo, i.e. a man with extremely slow reflexes and a huge speech impediment, which does not allow him to speak before he loudly inhaled and exhaled. He retired in 1992 for health reasons.

== Selected filmography ==
- Colpo gobbo all'italiana (1962) as Maggiola
- Those Two in the Legion (1962) - Sergeant Tresport
- Le massaggiatrici (1962) - Brigadiere Calascione
- The Four Monks (1962) - Massaro Calogero
- The Two Colonels (1963) - Soldato La Padula
- Toto vs. the Four (1963) - Usciere Pappalardo
- Divorzio alla siciliana (1963)
- Le motorizzate (1963) - (uncredited)
- The Swindlers (1963) - Guard at the graveyard (segment "Siciliani")
- The Four Musketeers (1963) - Capitano della Guardia
- Two Escape from Sing Sing (1964) - Thompson
- Oh! Those Most Secret Agents! (1964) - Russian agent
- I due toreri (1964) - Jannot
- Two Sergeants of General Custer (1965) - Schultz
- Con rispetto parlando (1965)
- How We Got into Trouble with the Army (1965)
- Two Mafiosi Against Goldginger (1965) - Un Vigile (uncredited)
- Se non avessi più te (1965) - La Bennola
- Non son degno di te (1965) - Sergente balbuziente
- Two Sons of Ringo (1966) - Jimmy the Welsh (uncredited)
- Perdono (1966) - 'Tartaglione'
- Non mi dire mai good-bye (1967)
- I zanzaroni (1967) - (segment "Quelli qui partono")
- L'oro del mondo (1968) - First usher
- Better a Widow (1968) - Carmelo
- I 2 pompieri (1968) - Officier of Firemen
- Zum zum zum - La canzone che mi passa per la testa (1969) - Filiberto Caputo
- Il ragazzo che sorride (1969) - Male nurse
- Zum zum zum n° 2 (1969) - Filiberto Caputo
- Pensando a te (1969)
- Il suo nome è Donna Rosa (1969) - Gaetano
- Franco, Ciccio e il pirata Barbanera (1969)
- Lisa dagli occhi blu (1970) - Carmelino - the cook
- Ma chi t'ha dato la patente? (1970)
- W le donne (1970) - Sergeant
- Lady Barbara (1970) - The Gamekeeper Caruso
- Mezzanotte d'amore (1970) - Gaetano
- Venga a fare il soldato da noi (1971) - Cocuzza
- The Blonde in the Blue Movie (1971) - Customer at Sex Shop
- Armiamoci e partite! (1971) - Train Passenger with basket
- The Beasts (1971) - Orazio (segment "Il salvatore")
- Roma (1972) - Trattoria Waiter (uncredited)
- Il caso Pisciotta (1972) - Rocco Minotti
- Storia di fifa e di coltello - Er seguito d'er più (1972) - Zu' Nino
- Ku-Fu? Dalla Sicilia con furore (1973) - Ki Kaka Mai
- Bella, ricca, lieve difetto fisico, cerca anima gemella (1973) - Teresa's Servant
- Provaci anche tu Lionel (1973)
- 4 caporali e 1/2 e un colonnello tutto d'un pezzo (1973)
- Piedino il questurino (1974) - Fratello di Pascalone
- Farfallon (1974) - Capo delle guardie
- San Pasquale Baylonne protettore delle donne (1976) - Brigadiere dei carabinieri
- La figliastra (1976) - Fefè
- Il sergente Rompiglioni (1976) - Cpl. Baffo
- The Lady Medic (1976) - Pezzullo (uncredited)
- The Nurse on a Military Tour (1977) - Corporal at the depot
- The Soldier with Great Maneuvers (1978) - Infermiere
- La vedova del trullo (1979) - Maresciallo
- Café Express (1980) - Zappacosta, capostazione
- La dottoressa di campagna (1981) - Gustavo
- Chiamate 6969: taxi per signora (1981)
- Pierino il fichissimo (1981) - Maresciallo
- L'assistente sociale tutto pepe (1981) - 'Lacrima'
- Che casino... con Pierino! (1982) - Uncle Nino
- Giovani, belle... probabilmente ricche (1982)
- Messo comunale praticamente spione (1982) - Assessore Cipolla
- La sai l'ultima sui matti? (1982) - Matto che cerca l'oculista
- Paulo Roberto Cotechiño centravanti di sfondamento (1983) - Bachisio
- Il Bi e il Ba (1986) - Pippo Miallo
- Cinema Paradiso (1988) - Peppino's Father
