= The School Teacher =

1975 film by Nando Cicero

L'insegnante The School Teacher
- Directed by: Nando Cicero
- Written by: Tito Carpi; Nando Cicero
- Produced by: Luciano Martino
- Starring: Edwige Fenech; Vittorio Caprioli; Alvaro Vitali
- Cinematography: Giancarlo Ferrando
- Edited by: Eugenio Alabiso
- Music by: Guido De Angelis; Maurizio De Angelis
- Release date: 1975
- Running time: 95 minutes
- Country: Italy
- Language: Italian

L'insegnante (internationally released as The School Teacher and Sexy Schoolteacher) is a 1975 commedia sexy all'italiana directed by Nando Cicero. The film had a great commercial success and generated an "Insegnante" (Schoolteacher) film series, that consists of six titles, three of them starred by Edwige Fenech in the main role. L'insegnante represents the first major role for Alvaro Vitali, who in a short time would become a star of the genre. Fenech reprises the name of Giovanna from her previous box-office hit Giovannona Long-Thigh. The film was followed by The Schoolteacher Goes to Boys' High.

== Plot ==
A rich Sicilian, Fefè Mottola, is looking for a tutor for his failing son, and comes across the beautiful Giovanna, a wealthy graduate set on becoming a teacher. The boy, named Franco, is shocked by the physical beauty of the teacher, and so to restrain himself decides to pose as gay. But the deception does not last long, because the sexual impulses of Alfredo explode.

== Cast ==
- Edwige Fenech: Giovanna Pagaus
- Vittorio Caprioli: Fefe Mottola
- Alfredo Pea: Franco Mottola
- Alvaro Vitali: Tatuzzo
- Carlo Delle Piane: Professor Cali
- Enzo Cannavale: Peppino
- Mario Carotenuto: Margara
- Gianfranco D'Angelo: Professor Puntiglio
- Stefano Amato: La Rosa
- Francesca Romana Coluzzi: Amalia Mottola
