= High School Girl =

1974 film

- Directed by: Sergio Martino
- Written by: Sergio Martino; Fernando Popoli; Sauro Scavolini
- Produced by: Carlo Ponti
- Starring: Susan Player; Riccardo Cucciolla; Alfredo Pea; Hugh Griffith
- Cinematography: Giancarlo Ferrando
- Edited by: Eugenio Alabiso
- Music by: Claudio Mattone
- Production company: Champion Cinematografica
- Release date: 4 March 1974
- Running time: 90 minutes
- Country: Italy
- Language: Italian

High School Girl (Italian: Cugini carnali, also known as The Visitor, Loving Cousins and Hot and Bothered) is a 1974 commedia sexy all'italiana film co-written and directed by Sergio Martino and starring Susan Player.

== Plot ==
A shy and inexperienced 16-year-old boy enjoys an awakening when his fast-living cousin from the city comes to stay at the family villa.

== Cast ==
- Susan Player as Sonia
- Riccardo Cucciolla as Celio D'Altamura
- Alfredo Pea as Nico D'Altamura
- Hugh Griffith as Baron of Roccadura
- Claudio Nicastro as Don Savino
- Rosalba Neri as Altomare
- Fiorella Masselli as Berenice
- Renzo Marignano as Sonia' father
- Lia Tanzi as Baron of Roccadura's maid
- Mauro Perrucchetti as Arcalli
- Edda Ferronao as Berenice
- Raf Baldassarre
- Carla Mancini

== Production ==
The film was produced by Champion Cinematografica. It was Martino's second consecutive film produced by Carlo Ponti, following the success of The Violent Professionals. It had the working title La cugina ('The cousin'), that was changed because of the Aldo Lado's film with the same title. Martino's first choices for the main role were Monica Guerritore and Gloria Guida. It was shot in Apulia, between Lecce, Monopoli, Nardò, Conversano and Porto Cesareo. Michele Massimo Tarantini served as assistant director.

== Release ==
The film was distributed in Italian cinemas by Interfilm starting from 4 March 1974.

== Reception ==
Domestically, the film was a success, grossing over 800 million lire. La Stampa's film critic Achille Valdata noted that "Martino lacks the effortless wit needed to handle a genre already showing evident signs of fatigue, only superficially concealed by the familiar verbal and visual extravagances".
