= The Soldier with Great Maneuvers =

1978 film

- Directed by: Nando Cicero
- Written by: Annie Albert; Nando Cicero; Fiorenzo Fiorentini
- Starring: Edwige Fenech; Renzo Montagnani
- Cinematography: Giancarlo Ferrando
- Edited by: Daniele Alabiso
- Music by: Piero Umiliani
- Distributed by: Medusa
- Release date: 1978
- Language: Italian

The Soldier with Great Maneuvers (Italian: La soldatessa alle grandi manovre, French: La toubib prend du galon) is a 1978 commedia sexy all'italiana film co-written and directed by Nando Cicero and starring Edwige Fenech. It is the sequel of The Nurse on a Military Tour.

== Cast ==
- Edwige Fenech as Eva Marini
- Renzo Montagnani as Colonel Narciso Fiaschetta
- Alvaro Vitali as Alvaro Persichetti
- Michele Gammino as Gianluca Capretti
- Lino Banfi as Don Pagnotta
- Gianfranco D'Angelo as Medical Captain
- Lucio Montanaro as Salvatore
- Enzo Monteduro as Calogero
- Antonino Faà di Bruno as General Barattoli
- Renzo Ozzano as the Sergeant
- Tiberio Murgia as Carmelo
- Rita Di Lernia as Leoparda
- Grazia Di Marzà as Fiaschetta's mother
- [ [Nino Terzo]] as the male nurse
- Max Turilli as General Castigo di Dio
- Renato Malavasi as Pepito
- Jacques Stany as the Captain
- Enzo Maggio as the old man
- Salvatore Baccaro as Crispino

== Production ==
The film was a co-production between Devon Film, Medusa, Films Jacques Leitienne, and Imp.Ex.Ci. It was shot in Elba.

== Release ==
The film was released in Italian cinemas by Medusa in August 1978.

== Reception ==
Domestically the film was a hit, grossing over 1.100 million lire. Giovanna Grassi on Corriere della Sera described it as "a thin little story [...] that is nothing more than an alibi for stitching together already known jokes, gags and characterisations".
