= Creampuff (disambiguation) =

Creampuff typically describes a French choux pastry known as profiterole. It may refer to:

- Cornetti alla crema, also known as "Creampuffs"
- Creampuff, a character from the American television series Yogi's Treasure Hunt
- Cream Puff, a character from the American television series Mickey Mouse Funhouse
- Automobile culture slang for a vehicle for very high quality condition especially of vintage models
