= Una bella governante di colore =

1976 film by Luigi Russo

- Italian theatrical release poster
- Directed by: Luigi Russo
- Written by: Marino Onorati; Luigi Rosso
- Cinematography: Mario Capriotti
- Music by: Gianfranco Plenizio
- Release date: 1976
- Country: Italy
- Language: Italian

Una bella governante di colore is a 1976 Italian commedia sexy all'italiana directed by Luigi Russo and starring Renzo Montagnani with Pasolini muse Ines Pellegrini.

In France, the film was released in an adult version with addition of two French-produced hardcore sequences and under the title Poupées sur canapé in 1978.

== Plot ==
Nicola Salluzzi is the owner of an insecticide company and his teenage son Simone has the habit of sleeping with his female employees. After Simone has impregnated successive housemaids and put the family name in jeopardy, Nicola and his wife Aspasia decide to hire a black housemaid, presuming that she will be just too ugly. However, the new housemaid Myriam soon attracts Simone with her exotic beauty. On the other hand, Nicola is also troubled in his relationship with his mistress Dr. Santina.

== Cast ==
- Renzo Montagnani as Nicola Salluzzi
- Ines Pellegrini as Myriam
- Jean-Claude Verné as Simone Salluzzi
- Orchidea De Santis as Dr. Santina
- Marisa Merlini as Aspasia Salluzzi
- Carlo Delle Piane as Pasquale, Aspasia's brother
- Gianfranco D'Angelo as Prof. Klipper
- Lu-Maria Lise as Nicola's secretary
