= Giancarlo Ferrando =

Italian cinematographer

- Born: 4 November 1939; Rome, Italy
- Died: 13 August 2020 (aged 80); Rome, Italy
- Occupation: Cinematographer

Giancarlo Ferrando (4 November 1939 – 13 August 2020) was an Italian film cinematographer and director.

== Life and career ==
Born in Rome, Ferrando had his first cinema experience as a child, playing a bit part in Alessandro Blasetti's In Olden Days. In the late 1950s he became assistant operator under Augusto Tiezzi, and after working for over a decade as an operator and an assistant cinematographer, he made his debut as a cinematographer in 1971.

Ferrando is best known for his professional association with the Martino brothers, the director Sergio and the producer Luciano. In 1994 he directed his only film, La ragazza di Cortina (transl. "The Girl from Cortina"), starring Vanessa Gravina. He died of cancer on 13 August 2020, at the age of 80.

== Selected filmography ==
- And the Crows Will Dig Your Grave (1971)
- All the Colors of the Dark (1972)
- Your Vice Is a Locked Room and Only I Have the Key (1972)
- Torso (1973)
- The Violent Professionals (1973)
- The Visitor (1974)
- Ten Killers Came from Afar (1974)
- La bellissima estate (1974)
- Gambling City (1975)
- Silent Action (1975)
- The School Teacher (1975)
- The Suspicious Death of a Minor (1975)
- The Teasers (1975)
- Sex with a Smile (1976)
- Confessions of a Lady Cop (1976)
- Crimebusters (1976)
- Sex with a Smile II (1976)
- The Lady Medic (1976)
- The Virgo, the Taurus and the Capricorn (1977)
- Taxi Girl (1977)
- Per amore di Poppea (1977)
- The Nurse on a Military Tour (1977)
- Slave of the Cannibal God (1978)
- Loggerheads (1978)
- The School Teacher in the House (1978)
- The Soldier with Great Maneuvers (1978)
- Island of the Fishmen (1979)
- A Policewoman on the Porno Squad (1979)
- The Great Alligator River (1979)
- Il ladrone (1980)
- Qua la mano (1980)
- L'insegnante al mare con tutta la classe (1980)
- La moglie in vacanza... l'amante in città (1980)
- Sugar, Honey and Pepper (1980)
- Il casinista (1980)
- Manolesta (1981)
- Cornetti alla crema (1981)
- A Policewoman in New York (1981)
- Culo e camicia (1981)
- Don't Play with Tigers (1982)
- The Scorpion with Two Tails (1982)
- The Sword of the Barbarians (1982)
- Ironmaster (1983)
- 2019, After the Fall of New York (1983)
- Occhio, malocchio, prezzemolo e finocchio (1983)
- Warrior of the Lost World (1984)
- Monster Shark (1984)
- Hands of Steel (1986)
- Detective School Dropouts (1986)
- The Messenger (1986)
- The Opponent (1988)
- Casablanca Express (1989)
- Troll 2 (1990)
- Cop Target (1990)
- Door to Silence (1991)
- Dark Tale (1991)
- Un orso chiamato Arturo (1992)
- Spiando Marina (1992)
- Palermo - Milan One Way (1995)
- The Return of Sandokan (1996)
- Desert of Fire (1997)
- Uninvited (1999)
- L'allenatore nel pallone 2 (2008)
