= The Family Vice =

1975 film

- Directed by: Mariano Laurenti
- Written by: Marino Onorati; Cesare Frugoni; Gianfranco Couyoumdjian
- Starring: Edwige Fenech
- Cinematography: Federico Zanni
- Edited by: Alberto Moriani
- Music by: Gianni Ferrio
- Release date: 7 October 1975
- Country: Italy
- Language: Italian

The Family Vice (Italian: Il vizio di famiglia) is a 1975 commedia sexy all'italiana directed by Mariano Laurenti and starring Edwige Fenech.

== Plot ==
As the wealthy Count Giosuè is about to die, a no-holds-barred war between relatives opens around his bedside. These include his illegitimate daughter Suzie, his wife Ines, and his half-sister Magda, who hires a fake valet, Giacomo, to undermine the others' plans.

== Cast ==
- Edwige Fenech as Suzie
- Renzo Montagnani as Giacomo
- Juliette Mayniel as Magda
- Nieves Navarro (credited as Susan Scott) as Ines
- Gigi Ballista as Count Giosuè
- Roberto Pace as Marco
- Orchidea De Santis as Marisa
- Anna Melita as Noemi
- Enzo Andronico as Felice
- Renato Malavasi as Monsignor
- Gastone Pescucci as don Liborio

== Production ==
In spite of being set in Veneto, the film was actually shot in Tirrenia.

== Release ==
The film was released by Flora Film on 7 October 1975.

== Reception ==
In Italy, the film was a major hit, grossing over 1.187 million lira. It received mostly negative reviews from critics.
