= L'assistente sociale tutto pepe =

1981 film by Nando Cicero

- Directed by: Nando Cicero
- Written by: Michele Massimo Tarantini; Francesco Massaro; Stefano Canzio
- Starring: Nadia Cassini
- Cinematography: Antonio Rossati
- Music by: Andrea Lo Vecchio
- Release date: 1981
- Language: Italian

L'assistente sociale tutto pepe (The all pepper social worker), also known as L'assistente sociale tutta pepe e tutta sale, is a 1981 Italian commedia sexy all'italiana directed by Nando Cicero.

== Plot ==
Nadia, a social worker, is sent to a township where she meets strange people that in order to survive commit any sort of thefts and scams, usually without success ...

== Cast ==
- Nadia Cassini as Nadia
- Renzo Montagnani as Mr. Grappa
- Irene Papas as La fata
- Yorgo Voyagis as Bel Ami
- Nino Terzo as Lacrima
- Fiorenzo Fiorentini as the priest
- Gigi Ballista as the Bishop
