= Innocence and Desire =

1974 film by Massimo Dallamano

- Directed by: Massimo Dallamano
- Written by: Massimo Dallamano; Gianfranco Clerici
- Starring: Edwige Fenech
- Cinematography: Franco Delli Colli
- Music by: Renato Serio
- Release date: March 21, 1974
- Language: Italian

Innocence and Desire (Italian: Innocenza e turbamento) is a 1974 Italian commedia sexy all'italiana film directed by Massimo Dallamano.

== Plot ==
A young seminarian is back to his family to reflect on the sincerity of his mystical vocation. Here, in a pleasant Sicilian province, he has to face several sexual temptations, even encouraged by his grandfather Don Salvatore, who has satyriasis. When the grandfather dies, Carmela, his young stepmother, will definitively discourage the seminarian from his religious intentions.

== Cast ==
- Lionel Stander: Salvatore Niscemi
- Edwige Fenech: Carmela Paternò
- Roberto Cenci: Tonino Niscemi
- Vittorio Caprioli: Vincenzo Niscemi
- Anna Maria Pescatori: Lola
- Nerina Montagnani: Lola's maid
- Enzo Andronico: Driver

== See also ==
- List of Italian films of 1974
