= The School Teacher in the House =

1978 film by Michele Massimo Tarantini

- Directed by: Michele Massimo Tarantini
- Produced by: Luciano Martino
- Starring: Edwige Fenech
- Cinematography: Giancarlo Ferrando
- Music by: Franco Campanino
- Release date: 1978
- Country: Italy
- Language: Italian

L'insegnante viene a casa (internationally released as The School Teacher in the House) is a 1978 commedia sexy all'italiana directed by Michele Massimo Tarantini. The film is the third chapter in the "Schoolteacher" film series and the last one starring Edwige Fenech in the title role.

== Cast ==
- Edwige Fenech: Luisa De Dominicis
- Renzo Montagnani: Ferdinando Bonci Marinotti
- Lino Banfi: Amedeo
- Alvaro Vitali: Ottavio
- Carlo Sposito: Colonel Marullo
- Clara Colosimo: Colonel Marullo's wife
