= Roc Fleuri =

House in Nice, France

Coordinates: 43°41′21″N 7°17′43″E

Villa Roc Fleuri is an Art Deco house in the Mont Boron district of Nice, France. Locally it is known as the "Bond Villa", on account of its former owner having been Sean Connery.

The house was built in 1930.

In the 1970s and 1980s it was home to the actor Sean Connery and his wife, the artist Micheline Roquebrune, who was born in Nice.

The property has also been home to the French-Italian actress and producer Edwidge Fenech.

In 2025, it was listed for sale at Euro 23.5 million.
