= The Nurse on a Military Tour =

1977 film

- Directed by: Nando Cicero
- Written by: Annie Albert; Nando Cicero; Francesco Milizia
- Produced by: Luciano Martino
- Starring: Edwige Fenech; Renzo Montagnani
- Cinematography: Giancarlo Ferrando
- Edited by: Daniele Alabiso
- Music by: Piero Umiliani
- Distributed by: Medusa
- Release date: 1977
- Language: Italian

The Nurse on a Military Tour (Italian: La soldatessa alla visita militare, lit. 'The female soldier on the military visit') is a 1977 commedia sexy all'italiana film co-written and directed by Nando Cicero and starring Edwige Fenech.

== Cast ==
- Edwige Fenech as Eva Marini
- Renzo Montagnani as Colonel Narciso Fiaschetta
- Alvaro Vitali as Alvaro Quattromani
- Michele Gammino as Piras Gavino
- Mario Carotenuto as Colonel Farina
- Fiorenzo Fiorentini as Depot Marshal
- Lucio Montanaro as Montanaro
- Leo Gullotta as Captain Lopez
- Tiberio Murgia as General Patterson
- Enrico Beruschi as the priest
- Jacques Stany as Musumeci
- Nino Terzo as Depot Corporal
- Renzo Ozzano as Sergeant
- Dante Cleri as Commendator Guarducci
- Graziella Polesinanti as Graziella Guarducci

== Production ==
The film was produced by Dania Film. It had the working title Le soldatesse ('The women soldiers').

== Release ==
The film was released in Italian cinemas by Medusa on 2 September 1977.

== Reception ==
Domestically the film was a major hit, grossing over 1.330 million lire. Piero Virgintino on La Gazzetta del Mezzogiorno described it as "a crude, scabby spectacle saturated with the coarsest torpiloquy". A contemporary Corriere della Sera review called it a "crude farce" that "unblushingly explores every corner of unbridled profanity, and manages to turn any physical deformity or sordid misunderstanding into a heavy-handed, farcical gag".
