= Alfredo Pea =

Italian actor

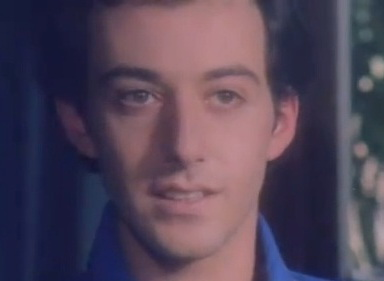
- Alfredo Pea in The School Teacher (1975)
- Born: 17 November 1954 (age 71); Rome, Italy
- Occupation: Actor

Alfredo Pea (born 17 November 1954) is an Italian stage, film and television actor.

== Life and career ==
Born in Rome, Pea studied acting at the "Studio di arti sceniche" drama school by Alessandro Fersen. He became first known in the mid-seventies thanks to a series of commedia sexy all'italiana films, in which he played the typical role of a shy teenager seduced by more experienced women. In the same period he started appearing, in secondary roles, in more ambitious art films, working with Giuliano Montaldo, Mario Monicelli, Marco Tullio Giordana and Giuseppe Ferrara, among others. From the late 1970s he is also active on television, in TV-movies and series of good success such as Il Capo dei Capi.

== Selected filmography ==
- High School Girl (1974)
- Classe mista (1975)
- The School Teacher (1975)
- And Agnes Chose to Die (1976)
- The Two Orphans (1976)
- The Lady Medic (1976)
- Closed Circuit (1978)
- To Love the Damned (1980)
- Control (1987)
- Weird Tales (1994)
- Oasi (1994)
- State Secret (1995)
- The Decameron (2024)
