= Armiamoci e partite! =

- Directed by: Nando Cicero
- Screenplay by: Leo Benvenuti; Piero De Bernardi; Nando Cicero; Giulio Scarnicci; Raimondo Vianello
- Story by: Giulio Scarnicci; Renzo Tarabusi; Steno
- Produced by: Luigi Rovere
- Starring: Franco Franchi; Ciccio Ingrassia
- Cinematography: Tino Santoni
- Music by: Piero Umiliani
- Release date: 1971
- Language: Italian

Armiamoci e partite! (Italian for "Let [us] arm ourselves and [you] go!") is a 1971 war comedy film directed by Nando Cicero and starring the comic duo Franco and Ciccio.

== Cast ==
- Franco Franchi as Franco
- Ciccio Ingrassia as Ciccio
- Martine Brochard as Lilì
- Philippe Clay as General McMaster
- Alfonso Tomas as Cpt. Dubois
- Anna Maestri
- Renato Baldini as Major Rembaud
- Gino Pagnani as French Captain
- Renato Pinciroli as French General
- Dante Cleri as Cafè Owner
- Alberto Sorrentino as Train Passenger
- Nino Terzo as Train Passenger
- Aldo Bufi Landi
- Luigi Bonos as Baron's Assistant
- Aldo Barberito as Lt. Duval
- Ignazio Leone as Doctor
- Corrado Olmi
