= Edwige Fenech =

French-Maltese actress, producer (born 1948)

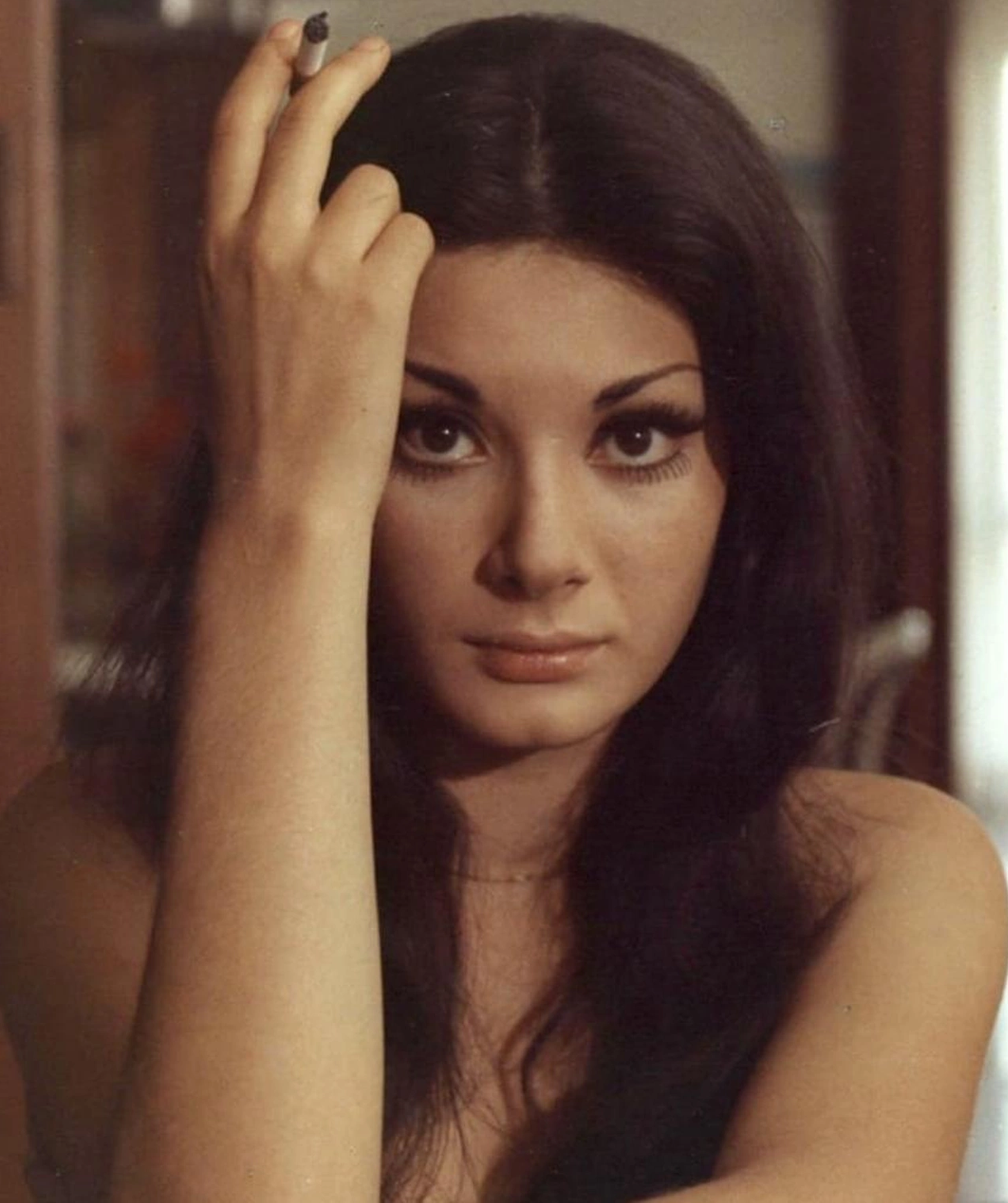
- Fenech in The Strange Vice of Mrs. Wardh (1971)
- Born: 24 December 1948 (age 77); Bône, French Algeria
- Occupations: Actress; producer
- Years active: 1968–present
- Known for: Five Dolls for an August Moon; The Strange Vice of Mrs. Wardh; The School Teacher; All the Colors of the Dark; Your Vice Is a Locked Room and Only I Have the Key
- Spouse: Luciano Martino (m. 1971; div. 1979)
- Children: 1

Edwige Fenech (French: [ɛdviʒ fənɛʃ], Italian: [edˈviʒ feˈnɛk, - ˈfɛːnek]; born 24 December 1948) is a French-Italian actress and film producer. She is known as the star of a series of commedia sexy all'italiana and giallo films released predominantly through her 20-year career in the 1970s and 80s, which turned her into a sex symbol.

== Early life ==
Fenech was born in Bône, Constantine, French Algeria (now Annaba, Annaba Province, Algeria) to an Algerian-Maltese father and an Italian mother from Ragusa, Sicily. Her parents divorced when she was a child, and Fenech was raised in Nice with her mother.

== Career ==
Fenech moved from Nice to Rome in 1967 for her first Italian film Samoa, Queen of the Jungle by Guido Malatesta. In 1968, she came under contract with Austrian director Franz Antel and from the late 1960s to early 1970s, she acted in various films of Antel (including his Frau Wirtin series) as well as that of Franz Marischka.

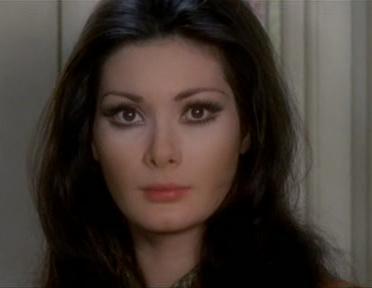
Fenech in All the Colors of the Dark (1972)

Fenech starred in many genres of cinema but her greatest commercial success came with commedia sexy all'italiana films, particularly including earlier works Ubalda, All Naked and Warm (1972) and Giovannona Long-Thigh (1973), as well as the following l'insegnante (school teacher), la soldatessa (soldier), la poliziotta (policewoman) series and other films that featured Fenech in stereotypical professions, which further bolstered Fenech's position as the most popular actress of the genre. She often paired with Carlo Giuffrè and later with Renzo Montagnani in commedia sexy films.

Fenech was also a regular in giallo films. Her works in this genre include The Seducers (1969), Five Dolls for an August Moon (1970), The Strange Vice of Mrs. Wardh (1971), Your Vice Is a Locked Room and Only I Have the Key (1972), All the Colors of the Dark (1972), The Case of the Bloody Iris (1972), Strip Nude for Your Killer (1975), and Phantom of Death (1987).

=== Later career ===
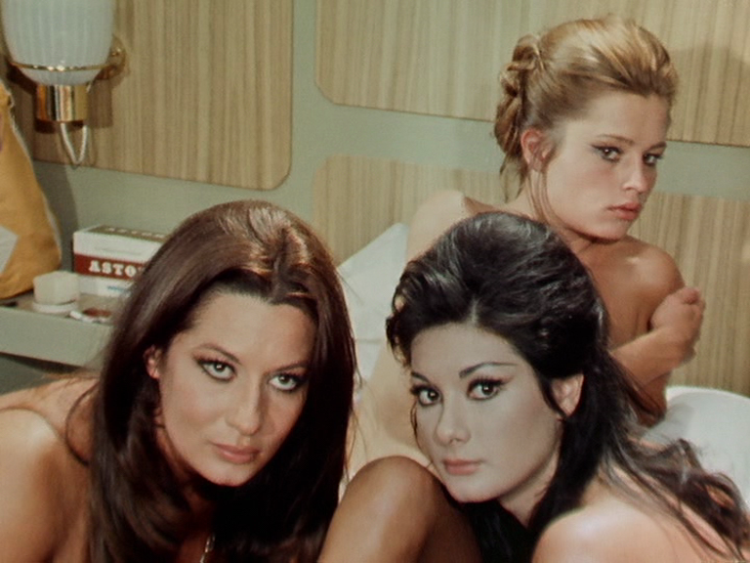
Fenech, Eva Thulin and Rosalba Neri in The Seducers (1969)

In the 1980s, she became a television personality, typically appearing with Barbara Bouchet on a chat show on Italian television. After many years of work in movie production, she co-produced The Merchant of Venice (2004) with Al Pacino, and later accepted Eli Roth's offer to appear in another movie, Hostel: Part II (2007). Quentin Tarantino named the character of General Ed Fenech in Inglourious Basterds (2009) in her honour, and invited Fenech to the Italian premiere of his film.

== Personal life ==
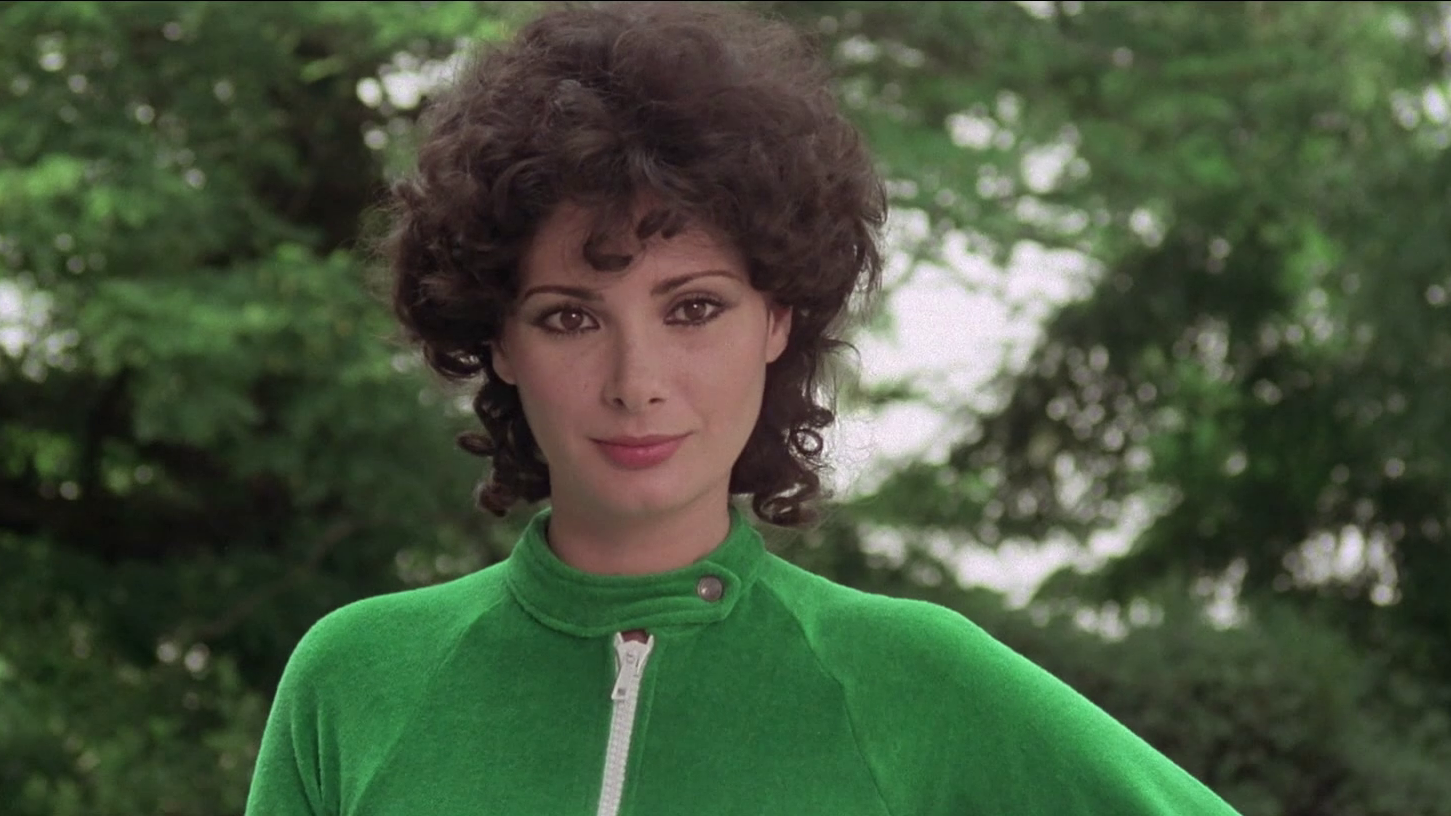
Fenech in The Family Vice (1975)

Fenech was married to Italian film producer Luciano Martino from 1971 to 1979.

In the mid-1990s, she was engaged to the Italian industrialist Luca di Montezemolo. Her son Edwin (born 1971) has worked at her production company and was the former CEO of Ferrari Asia-Pacific, Ferrari Greater China and Ferrari North America.

She considers herself Roman Catholic.

== In popular culture ==
The English metal band Cathedral wrote the song "Edwige's Eyes" on their album The Guessing Game as a tribute to the actress.

== Filmography ==
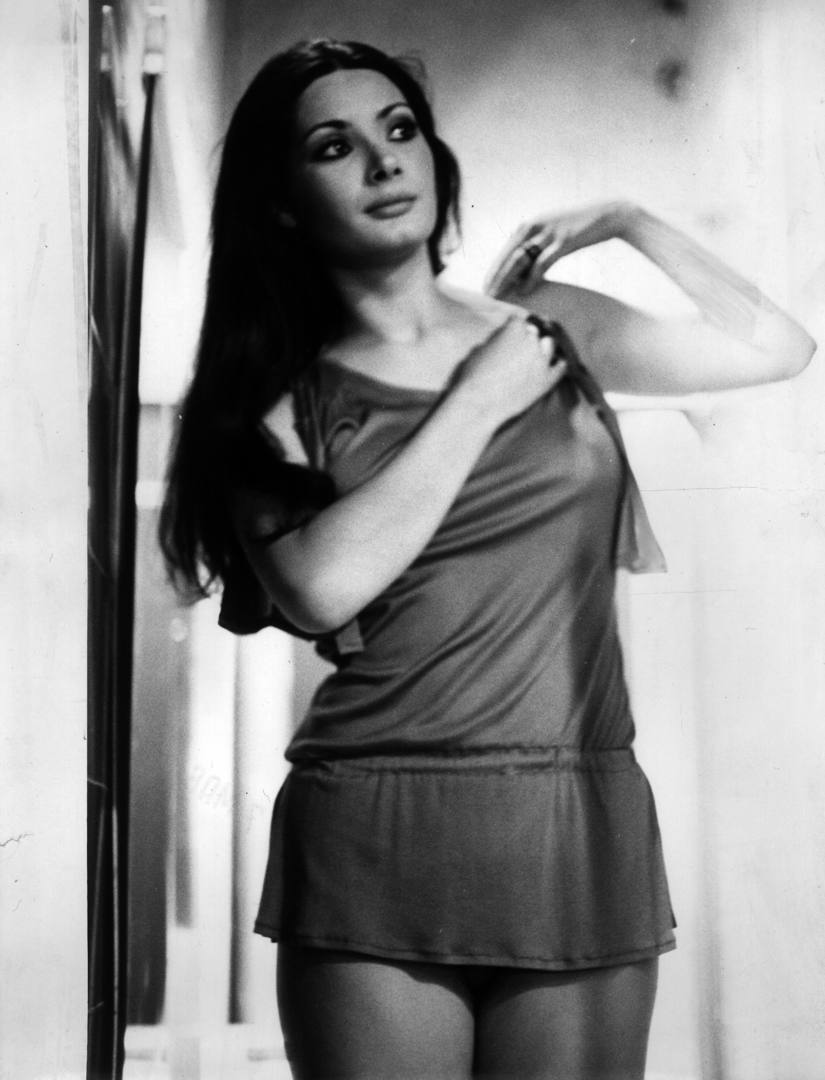
Fenech in Poker in Bed (1974)

| Year | Title | Role | Director | Notes |
|---|---|---|---|---|
| 1967 | All Mad About Him | Gina | Norbert Carbonnaux | |
| 1968 | Samoa, Queen of the Jungle | Samoa | Guido Malatesta | |
| 1968 | The Son of Black Eagle | Nastacia | Guido Malatesta | |
| 1968 | Sexy Susan Sins Again | Céline | Franz Antel | |
| 1969 | The Seducers | Ulla | Ottavio Alessi | |
| 1969 | House of Pleasure | Rosalie Bobinet | Franz Antel | |
| 1969 | The Brazen Women of Balzac | Felicitas | Giuseppe Zaccariello | |
| 1969 | Madame and Her Niece | Yvette | Eberhard Schröder | |
| 1969 | Heads or Tails | Manuela | Piero Pierotti | |
| 1969 | Let It All Hang Out | Hong-Kong | Franz Marischka | |
| 1969 | The Sweet Pussycats | Blande | Giuseppe Zaccariello | |
| 1969 | Madame Bovary | Emma Bovary | Hans Schott-Schöbinger | |
| 1970 | Satiricosissimo | Poppaea Sabina | Mariano Laurenti | |
| 1970 | Five Dolls for an August Moon | Marie Chaney | Mario Bava | |
| 1970 | Don Franco e Don Ciccio nell'anno della contestazione | Anna Bellinzoni | Marino Girolami | |
| 1970 | Le Mans, Shortcut to Hell | Cora | Osvaldo Civirani | |
| 1971 | The Strange Vice of Mrs. Wardh | Julie Wardh | Sergio Martino | |
| 1971 | Nights and Loves of Don Juan | Aisha | Alfonso Brescia | |
| 1971 | Desert of Fire | Juana | Renzo Merusi | |
| 1972 | All the Colors of the Dark | Jane Harrison | Sergio Martino | |
| 1972 | The Case of the Bloody Iris | Jennifer Osterman | Giuliano Carnimeo | |
| 1972 | Your Vice Is a Locked Room and Only I Have the Key | Floriana | Sergio Martino | |
| 1972 | When Women Were Called Virgins | Giulia Varrone | Aldo Grimaldi | |
| 1972 | Naughty Nun | Antonia | Mariano Laurenti | |
| 1972 | Ubalda, All Naked and Warm | Ubalda | Mariano Laurenti | |
| 1973 | Holy God, Here Comes the Passatore! | Mora | Giuliano Carnimeo | |
| 1973 | Giovannona Long-Thigh | Giovannona Coscialunga | Sergio Martino | |
| 1973 | The Inconsolable Widow Thanks All Those Who Consoled Her | Catarina Prevosti | Mariano Laurenti | |
| 1973 | Mean Frank and Crazy Tony | Orchidea | Michele Lupo | |
| 1973 | Anna, quel particolare piacere | Anna Lovisi | Giuliano Carnimeo | |
| 1974 | Innocence and Desire | Carmela Paternò | Massimo Dallamano | |
| 1974 | Poker in Bed | Eva | Giuliano Carnimeo | |
| 1975 | Lover Boy | Marianna Persiquetti | Marino Girolami | |
| 1975 | The School Teacher | Giovanna Pagaus | Nando Cicero | |
| 1975 | Strip Nude for Your Killer | Magda | Andrea Bianchi | |
| 1975 | The Family Vice | Suzie | Mariano Laurenti | |
| 1975 | La moglie vergine | Valentina | Marino Girolami | |
| 1976 | Sex with a Smile | Emilia Chiapponi | Sergio Martino | (segment "La cavallona") |
| 1976 | Confessions of a Lady Cop | Gianna Amicucci | Michele Massimo Tarantini | |
| 1976 | Evil Thoughts | Francesca Marani | Ugo Tognazzi | |
| 1976 | My Sister in Law | Viola Orlando / Rosa Orlando | Lucio Fulci | |
| 1976 | The Lady Medic | Dr. Elena Dogliotti | Nando Cicero | |
| 1977 | The Virgo, the Taurus and the Capricorn | Gioia Ferretti | Luciano Martino | |
| 1977 | Taxi Girl | Marcella | Michele Massimo Tarantini | |
| 1977 | The Nurse on a Military Tour | Eva Marini | Nando Cicero | |
| 1978 | The Greatest Battle | Danielle | Umberto Lenzi | |
| 1978 | The Schoolteacher Goes to Boys' High | Monica Sebastiani | Mariano Laurenti | |
| 1978 | The School Teacher in the House | Luisa De Dominicis | Michele Massimo Tarantini | |
| 1978 | The Soldier with Great Maneuvers | Dottoressa Eva Marini | Nando Cicero | |
| 1978 | Amori miei | Deborah | Steno | |
| 1979 | A Policewoman on the Porno Squad | Gianna D'Amico | Michele Massimo Tarantini | |
| 1979 | Dr. Jekyll Likes Them Hot | Barbara Wimply | Steno | |
| 1979 | Saturday, Sunday and Friday | Eng. Tokimoto | Sergio Martino | (segment "Sabato") |
| 1979 | Hot Potato | Maria | Steno | |
| 1980 | Il ladrone | Deborah | Pasquale Festa Campanile | |
| 1980 | I'm Photogenic | Cinzia Pancaldi | Dino Risi | |
| 1980 | La moglie in vacanza... l'amante in città | Giulia | Sergio Martino | |
| 1980 | Sugar, Honey and Pepper | Amalia Passalacqua | Sergio Martino | |
| 1980 | Catherine and I | Elisabetta | Alberto Sordi | |
| 1980 | Il ficcanaso | Susanna Luisetti | Bruno Corbucci | |
| 1981 | Asso | Silvia | Castellano & Pipolo | |
| 1981 | Tais-toi quand tu parles! | Béatrix | Philippe Clair | |
| 1981 | Cornetti alla crema | Marianna Tribalzi | Sergio Martino | |
| 1981 | A Policewoman in New York | Gianna Amicucci / La Pupa | Michele Massimo Tarantini | |
| 1982 | Don't Play with Tigers | Francesca Del Prà | Sergio Martino | |
| 1982 | Il paramedico | Nina Miglio | Sergio Nasca | |
| 1982 | An Ideal Adventure | Patrizia Reda | Steno | |
| 1984 | Vacanze in America | Miss De Romanis | Carlo Vanzina | |
| 1988 | Phantom of Death | Hélène Martell | Ruggero Deodato | |
| 1993 | Private Crimes | Nicole Venturi | Sergio Martino | 4 episodes |
| 2000 | Il fratello minore | | Stefano Gigli | |
| 2007 | Hostel: Part II | Art Class Professor | Eli Roth | |
| 2023 | La quattordicesima domenica del tempo ordinario | Sandra Rubin | Pupi Avati | |
