= The Schoolteacher Goes to Boys' High =

1978 film by Mariano Laurenti

- Directed by: Mariano Laurenti
- Written by: Mariano Laurenti; Francesco Milizia
- Produced by: Luciano Martino
- Starring: Edwige Fenech; Renzo Montagnani; Alvaro Vitali
- Cinematography: Federico Zanni
- Edited by: Alberto Moriani
- Music by: Gianni Ferrio
- Distributed by: Medusa Film
- Release date: 1977
- Running time: 92 min
- Country: Italy
- Language: Italian

L'insegnante va in collegio (internationally released as The Schoolteacher Goes to Boys' High and The School Teacher in College) is a 1977 commedia sexy all'italiana directed by Mariano Laurenti. The film is the second in the "Schoolteacher" film series.

== Plot ==
A commander of northern Italy is embroiled in a shady deal, and is forced to flee to Apulia. There, the man falls in love with his son's beautiful teacher: Monica Sebastiani. The son, however, loves also Monica Sebastiani, and so comes into the fight with his father.

== Cast ==
- Edwige Fenech: Monica Sebastiani
- Renzo Montagnani: Riccardo Pozzoni
- Leo Colonna: Carlo Bolzoni
- Alvaro Vitali: Armandino
- Lino Banfi: Peppino
- Gianfranco D'Angelo: Prof. Strumolo
- Carlo Sposito: Prof. Morlupo
- Lucio Montanaro: Student
