= La moglie vergine =

1975 film by Marino Girolami

- Directed by: Marino Girolami (as Franco Martinelli)
- Written by: Carlo Veo; Marino Girolami
- Produced by: Edmondo Amati
- Starring: Edwige Fenech
- Cinematography: Fausto Zuccoli
- Music by: Armando Trovajoli
- Release date: 20 December 1975
- Running time: 100 minutes
- Country: Italy
- Language: Italian

La moglie vergine, internationally released as The Virgin Wife, Valentina and You've Got to Have Heart, is a 1975 Italian commedia sexy all'italiana directed by Marino Girolami (here credited as Franco Martinelli).

== Plot ==
For their honeymoon, Giovannino and Valentina go to the villa of his uncle Federico on Lake Iseo. Their first and subsequent nights are a failure, as she is shy and he, despite no difficulties with other women, cannot perform. News of this non-consummation spreads through the family and even into the town. To counter the shame, both Federico and the family lawyer offer to initiate Valentina, but she refuses. Tension mounts when Giovannino's brother Gianfranco arrives with his insatiable German wife Brigitte.

Valentina's mother Lucia also turns up to encourage her increasingly stressed daughter who, after a fierce family argument, runs out to the lakeside. Afraid she might attempt suicide, Giovannino and Lucia take a motor boat in search of her, but it runs out of fuel. A ferocious storm breaks and a young French tourist finds the soaked and shivering Valentina. Taking her to his tent, after getting her to strip and dry herself he quietly and tenderly takes her virginity. Meanwhile the soaked and shivering Giovannino and Lucia have paddled to shore and found shelter in a fisherman's hut where, after stripping and drying, Lucia finds he has no difficulty in making love.

When all three have found their way back to Federico's house in the morning, Lucia announces that Giovannino and Valentina will now come to live with her.

== Cast ==
- Edwige Fenech: Valentina
- Ray Lovelock: Giovannino Arrighini
- Renzo Montagnani: Federico
- Antonio Guidi: Caldura
- Michele Gammino: Gianfranco Arrighini
- Maria Rozaria Riuzzi: Camilla
- Florence Barnes: Brigitte Arrighini
- Carroll Baker: Lucia
- Gabriella Giorgelli: Matilde
