= Giovani, belle... probabilmente ricche =

1982 film by Michele Massimo Tarantini

- Directed by: Michele Massimo Tarantini (as Michael E. Lemick)
- Written by: Tito Carpi; Francesco Milizia; Michele Massimo Tarantini
- Produced by: Luigi Borghese; Manuel Laghi
- Starring: Carmen Russo; Nadia Cassini
- Cinematography: Giuseppe Pinori
- Music by: Fabio Frizzi
- Release date: 1982
- Running time: 88 minutes
- Country: Italy
- Language: Italian

Giovani, belle... probabilmente ricche is a 1982 commedia sexy all'italiana film directed by Michele Massimo Tarantini and starring Carmen Russo and Nadia Cassini, most prominent stars of the genre in the early 1980s with Olinka Hardiman (credited as Olinka Link).

== Plot ==
Claudia, Rita, and Caterina are three friends who live in a conservative Italian town and lead seemingly neat and respectable married lives. One day, they are summoned to the notary public's office and learn that Anna, one of their peers in high school who got a bad name as a "whore" in the town because of them and was forced to leave is now dead. Furthermore, she had amassed a great fortune abroad and decided to bequeath it to the three. However, she has a strange condition: Claudia, Rita, and Caterina should cheat on their husbands within three days and provide photographic evidence or else the inheritance will be donated to the retirement home. Claudia is already running a secret affair with Caterina's husband Gabriele but has not considered that photographic evidence may be a problem in her plans whereas Caterina attempts to have sex with dim-witted Giacomo she has been seducing for a while. On the other hand, Rita tells of the inheritance to her husband Filippo, and greedy Filippo, incorrectly thinking that his wife will be too timid to accomplish the task, decides to intervene. As a result of the inevitable high jinks, the real face of the reputable town life and deeds of Claudia, Rita, and Caterina in particular will be exposed.

== Cast ==
- Carmen Russo: Claudia
- Nadia Cassini: Rita
- Olinka Hardiman: Caterina
- Michele Gammino: Gabriele, Caterina's husband
- Gianfranco D'Angelo: Filippo, Rita's husband
- Lucio Montanaro: Giacomo
- Sergio Leonardi: Alberto, Claudia's husband
- Gianni Ciardo: Cellist Giovanni
- Alessandra Canale: Gabriele's assistant

== See also ==
- List of Italian films of 1982
