= Renzo Montagnani =

Italian actor and voice actor (1930–1997)

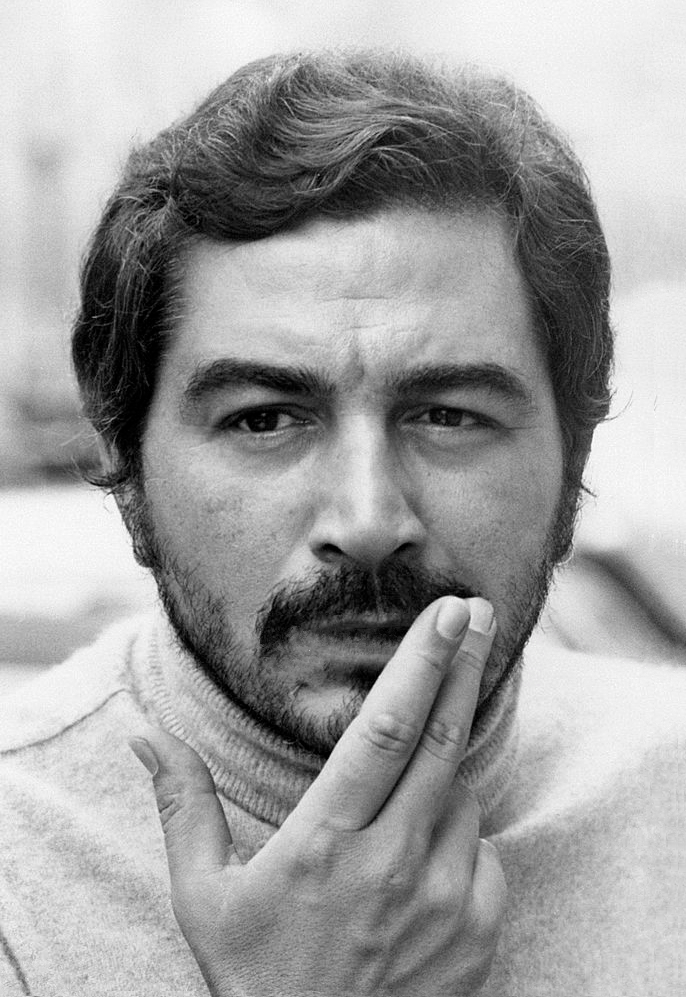
- Montagnani in 1972
- Born: 11 September 1930; Alessandria, Italy
- Died: 22 May 1997 (aged 66); Rome, Italy
- Occupations: Actor; voice actor
- Years active: 1961–1997
- Height: 1.77 m (5 ft 10 in)
- Spouse: Eileen Jarvis (m. 1959)
- Children: 1

Renzo Montagnani (pronounced [ˈrɛntso montaɲˈɲaːni]; 11 September 1930 – 22 May 1997) was an Italian actor and voice actor.

== Biography ==
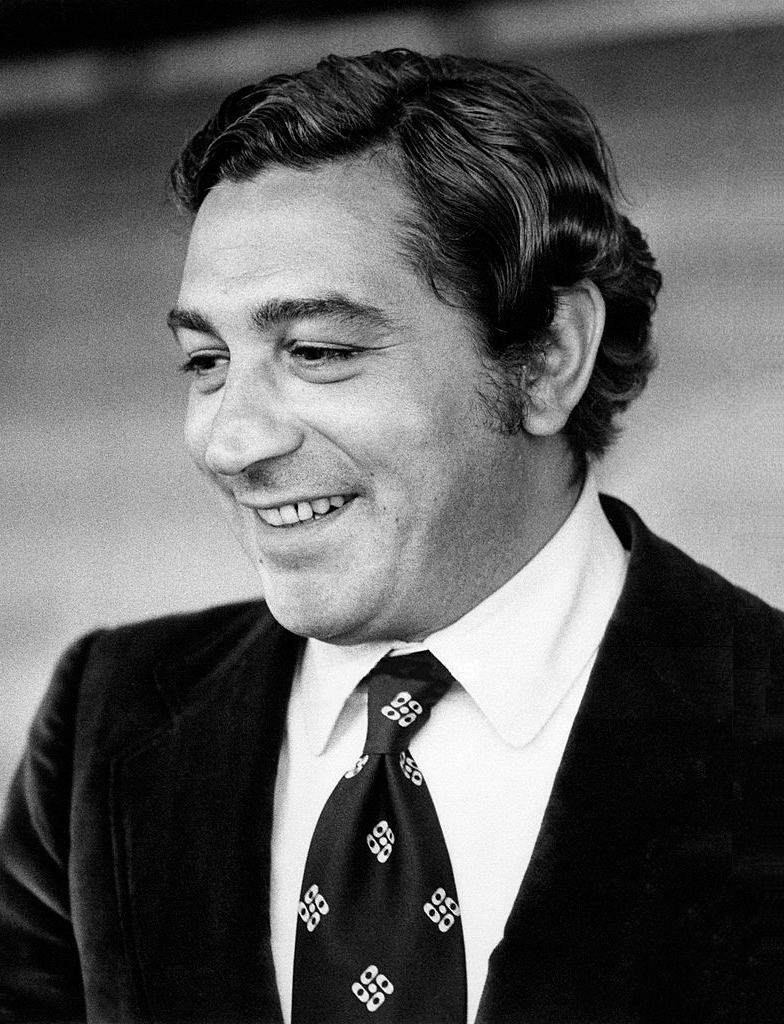
Renzo Montagnani in 1971

Montagnani was born in Alessandria, Piedmont, and debuted as theatre actor thanks to the help of Erminio Macario. His first cinema success was his dramatic role in Metello (1970), but he later switched to the commedia all'italiana with his roles in the last two chapters of the Amici miei series (1982 and 1985). In the 1980s he also participated to a TV show as Don Fumino, an easy-speaking Tuscan parish priest.

Montagnani also intensively worked as dubber, dubbing actors such as Michel Piccoli, Charles Bronson and Philippe Noiret for the Italian version of movies. He was also the Italian voice of Thomas O'Malley in the 1970 Disney film The Aristocats.

In his later years he participated to numerous commedia sexy all'italiana films, often pairing with Edwige Fenech, the most popular actress of the genre, and also with Alvaro Vitali as the comic sidekick.

=== Personal life ===
In 1959, Montagnani married Eileen Jarvis, who was a member of the Bluebell Girls. In 1963, they had one son, Daniele.

== Death ==
Montagnani died in Rome of lung cancer on 22 May 1997 at the age of 66. He was buried in England. His son Daniele, died of cancer in 2004 and was buried alongside his father.

== Filmography ==
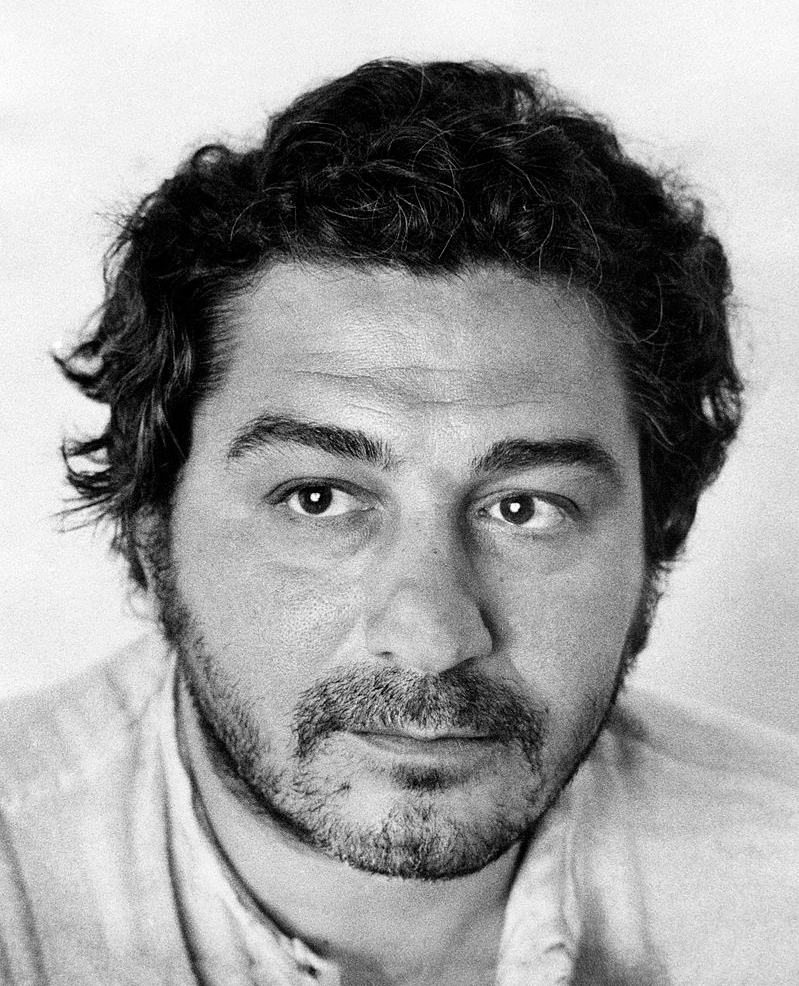
Renzo Montagnani in 1972

- Dreams Die at Dawn (1961) as Sergio
- Dal sabato al lunedi (1962) as custom man
- Honeymoon, Italian Style (1966) as Nicola
- The Seven Cervi Brothers (1968) as Ferdinando Cervi
- Donne, botte e bersaglieri (1968) as Luigi
- Faustina (1968) as Quirino
- La matriarca (1969) as Fabrizio
- Metello (1970) as Poldo Salani (uncredited)
- When Women Had Tails (1970) as Maluc
- Tre ipotesi sulla morte di Pinelli (1970, Short)
- Mazzabubù... Quante corna stanno quaggiù? (1971) as Bepi, the farmer
- Una cavalla tutta nuda (1972) as Gulfardo de Bardi
- Il sindacalista (1972) as Luigi Tamperletti
- La calandria (1972) as Gandolfo
- The Weapon, the Hour & the Motive (1972) as commissioner Franco Boito
- Il prode Anselmo e il suo scudiero (1972) as Ottone
- Fiorina la vacca (1972) as Compare Menico
- Number One (1973) as Vinci
- The Assassination of Matteotti (1973) as Umberto Tancredi
- Massacre in Rome (1973) as police chief Pietro Caruso
- The Mad Adventures of Rabbi Jacob (1973) as colonel Farès
- The Prey (1974) as Daniel Lester
- Scandal in the Family (1975, regia di Bruno Gaburro) as Carlo
- The Family Vice (1975) as Giacomo
- La nuora giovane (1975) as Accountant
- Private Lessons (1975) as Giulio - uncle of Alessandro
- The Virgin Wife (1975) as Uncle Federico Arrighini
- My Friends (1975) as Giorgio Perozzi (voice, uncredited)
- Quel movimento che mi piace tanto (1976) as Il 'marquis' Cecco Ottobuoni
- Sex Diary (1976) as Luca Reali
- My Father's Private Secretary (1976) as Armando Ponziani
- Donna... cosa si fa per te (1976) as Francesco 'Cecco' Balducci
- Cassiodoro il più duro del pretorio (1976)
- Ladies' Doctor (1977) as Dr. Franco Giovanardi
- Sins in the Country (1977) as Angelo Lo Curcio / Sindaco-Mayor
- L'appuntamento (1977) as Adelmo Bartalesi
- The Nurse on a Military Tour (1977) as colonel Narciso Fiaschetta
- When the Silver Crows Fly (1977) as Maineddu
- The Schoolteacher Goes to Boys' High (1978) as Riccardo Bolzoni
- Una bella governante di colore (1978) as Nicola Sallusti
- The School Teacher in the House (1978) as Ferdinando Bonci Marinotti
- The Soldier with Great Maneuvers (1978) as colonel Fiaschetta
- Lovers and Liars (1979) as Omero
- L'insegnante balla... con tutta la classe (1979) as Prof. Martorelli
- Where Can You Go Without the Little Vice? (1979) as Diogene Colombo
- La vedova del trullo (1979) as Nicola /Prof. Luigi Granini
- Scusi, lei è normale? (1979) as Gustavo Sparvieri
- Io zombo, tu zombi, lei zomba (1979) as undertaker
- Riavanti... Marsch! (1979) as Lieutenant Pietro Bianchi
- La giacca verde (1979, TV Movie) as Romualdi
- Il corpo della ragassa (1979) as Pasquale Aguzzi
- Qua la mano (1980) as Libero Battaglini
- La moglie in vacanza... l'amante in città (1980) as Andrea Damiani
- Prestami tua moglie (1980) as Mario Bonotto
- La liceale al mare con l'amica di papà (1980) as Massimo Castaldi
- Una moglie, due amici, quattro amanti (1980) as Luigi Frontoni
- Il casinista (1980) as Enrico Marcullo
- Tutta da scoprire (1981) as Arturo Bonafé
- C'è un fantasma nel mio letto (1981) as Baron Sir Archibald Trenton
- I carabbinieri (1981) as General Nencini
- Per favore, occupati di Amelia (1981) as Marcello
- Mia moglie torna a scuola (1981) as Aristide Buratti
- Perché non facciamo l'amore? (1981) as Dr. Bernardino Livi
- A Policewoman in New York (1981) as Maccarone
- La dottoressa preferisce i marinai (1981) as suicide
- L'assistente sociale tutto pepe (1981) as 'Gratta'
- Il marito in vacanza (1981) as Prof. Esposito / Cardinal Peppino
- I carabbimatti (1981) as Dallas (uncredited)
- Crema, cioccolata e pa... prika (1981) as Osvaldo Bonifazi
- Pierino la Peste alla riscossa (1982) as Pier Maria Delle Vedove
- Bankers Also Have Souls (1982) as L'émir Fayçal de Krator
- All My Friends Part 2 (1982) as Guido Necchi
- Giocare d'azzardo (1982) as Riccardo
- State buoni se potete (1983) as The Devil (Il diavolo)
- A Joke of Destiny (1983) as captain Pautasso of the DIGOS
- Occhio, malocchio, prezzemolo e finocchio (1983) as Aldovrandi
- Stesso mare stessa spiaggia (1983) as Il Trivella
- Champagne in Paradiso (1983) as Don Giovanni
- Amici miei atto III (1985) as Guido Necchi
- Quelli del casco (1988)
- Il volpone (1988) as Raffaele Voltore
- Rimini Rimini - Un anno dopo (1988) as Luciano Ambrosi ("La scelta")
- Zuppa di pesce (1992)
