= Lover Boy (1975 film) =

1975 film by Marino Girolami

- Italian theatrical release poster
- Directed by: Marino Girolami
- Screenplay by: Marino Girolami; Romano Scandariato
- Story by: Marino Girolami
- Starring: Edwige Fenech; Enrico Simonetti; Giusva Fioravanti
- Cinematography: Salvatore Caruso
- Edited by: Daniele Alabiso
- Music by: Enrico Simonetti
- Production company: CPM Cinematografica
- Release date: 1975
- Running time: 95 minutes
- Country: Italy

Lover Boy (Italian: Grazie... nonna) is an Italian sex comedy directed by Marino Girolami.

== Plot ==
Pino Persichetti (Enrico Simonetti) is a well-off engineer living in Pisa. He receives the news that his father who had emigrated to Venezuela years ago is now deceased and his widow is planning to visit Pisa and meet the family. Persichetti's adolescent son Carletto (Fioravanti) meets his "grandma" at the airport and while expecting an old woman, he sees that his late grandfather's wife Marianna (Fenech) is a very attractive young woman. He has an instant crush on Marianna but this will lead inexperienced Carletto to a concealed competition with other men interested in her, particularly his father and his older brother Giorgio (Fabrizio Cardinali).

== Cast ==
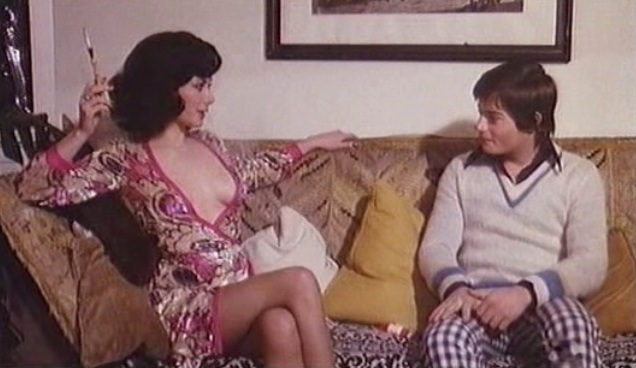
Fenech and Fioravanti in Lover Boy

- Giusva Fioravanti: Carletto Persichetti
- Edwige Fenech: Marianna
- Enrico Simonetti: Pino Persichetti
- Gianfranco D'Angelo: Friar Domenico
- Valeria Fabrizi: Celeste
- Fabrizio Cardinali: Giorgio Persichetti
- Graziella Mossini: Marinella

== Reception ==
From a contemporary review, John Pym reviewed the film in a dubbed 78 minute version. Pym stated the film was a "barely functional Italian sex comedy" and that "Patrons of this hackneyed fare may be disappointed to find that an older and larger stand-in substitutes for Carletto in his big scene."
