= Gianfranco D'Angelo =

Italian actor and comedian (1936–2021)

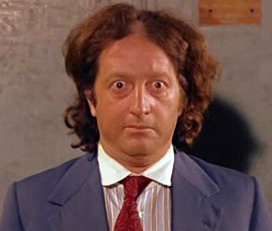
- D'Angelo in La liceale (1975)
- Born: 19 August 1936; Rome, Italy
- Died: 15 August 2021 (aged 84); Rome, Italy
- Occupations: Actor, comedian
- Height: 1.7 m (5 ft 7 in)

Gianfranco D'Angelo (19 August 1936 – 15 August 2021) was an Italian actor and comedian.

== Biography ==
Born in Rome into a very poor family, after losing his parents at the age of three, D'Angelo was raised by his aunt and uncle and graduated in accounting. While working for the telephone company TETI, he began acting with an amateur theatre company formed by his colleagues. He started his professional career as a comedian in the mid-1960s, achieving his first successes with the theatrical company Il Bagaglino. He had his breakout in the mid-1970s, with a series of successful television variety shows including Mazzabubù, C'era una volta Roma, La Sberla, and reached the peak of his popularity in the following decade with Drive In, Odiens and Striscia la notizia. D'Angelo was also very active in cinema between 1974 and 1982, but his film activity was limited to "sexy comedies" and B-movies.

D'Angelo died after a short illness on 15 August 2021 at the Gemelli Hospital in Rome, a few days before he turned 85. The funeral was celebrated on 17 August in the Church of the Artists in Piazza del Popolo in Rome.

== Filmography ==
- Zum zum zum - La canzone che mi passa per la testa (1969) - Party presenter
- Io non scappo... fuggo (1970)
- Bolidi sull'asfalto a tutta birra! (1970) - don Gelindo
- Lady Barbara (1970) - Fogarone
- Nel giorno del signore (1970) - Discepolo di Raffaello
- 4 marmittoni alle grandi manovre (1974) - Serafino
- Mondo candido (1975) - Barone
- Lover Boy (1975) - Fra' Domenico
- The School Teacher (1975) - Professor Puntiglio
- La liceale (1975) - Gianni Guidi / Professor
- Remo e Romolo (Storia di due figli di una lupa) (1976) - Tito Tazio
- Confessions of a Lady Cop (1976) - Onorevole Mannello
- Emmanuelle's Silver Tongue (1976) - Bobby
- Classe mista (1976) - Ciccio
- La professoressa di scienze naturali (1976) - Genesio
- The Lady Medic (1976) - Dottor Frustalupi
- Nerone (1977) - Tigellino
- Maschio latino cercasi (1977) - Il turista (segment "Accadde a Napoli")
- Kakkientruppen (1977) - Soldato Fritz
- Taxi Girl (1977) - Isidoro
- La compagna di banco (1977) - Professor Ilario Cacioppo
- Per amore di Poppea (1977) - Tizio
- Grazie tante - Arrivederci (1977) - Faustino
- The Schoolteacher Goes to Boys' High (1978) - Prof. Strumolo
- Scherzi da prete (1978) - Il Cardinale
- Una bella governante di colore (1978) - Professor Klipper
- La liceale nella classe dei ripetenti (1978) - Professor Pinzarrone
- The Soldier with Great Maneuvers (1978) - Capitano medico
- Io zombo, tu zombi, lei zomba (1979) - Buonanima
- Tutti a squola (1979) - Il preside
- 'Girls Will Be Girls (1980) - Piergallini
- Biancaneve & Co... (1982) - Lo specchio parlante
- Giovani, belle... probabilmente ricche (1982) - Filippo
- La gorilla (1982) - Ruby's Father
- Rimini Rimini - Un anno dopo (1988) - Alì ("Vuò cumprà")
- Se lo fai sono guai (2001) - Chirurgo
- Il crimine non va in pensione (2017) - Cesare
- W gli sposi (2019) - Sacrestano (final film role)
