= The Lady Medic =

1976 film by Nando Cicero

- Italian theatrical release poster by Enzo Sciotti
- Directed by: Nando Cicero
- Written by: Nando Cicero; Franco Milizia; Marino Onorati
- Produced by: Luciano Martino
- Starring: Edwige Fenech
- Cinematography: Giancarlo Ferrando
- Edited by: Daniele Alabiso
- Music by: Piero Umiliani
- Release date: 21 August 1976
- Running time: 93 minutes
- Country: Italy
- Language: Italian

The Lady Medic (Italian: La dottoressa del distretto militare) is a 1976 commedia sexy all'italiana film directed by Nando Cicero and starring Edwige Fenech.

== Plot ==
The official doctor is temporarily unable to carry out his service at the military hospital, so he is replaced by his sexy assistant (Fenech). The woman should face a parade of young men simulating the most absurd diseases to avoid their conscription.

== Cast ==
- Edwige Fenech as Dr. Elena Dogliotti
- Alfredo Pea as Gianni Montano
- Alvaro Vitali as Alvaro Pappalardo
- Carlo Delle Piane as Medical officer
- Gianfranco D'Angelo as Dottor Frustalupi
- Grazia Di Marzà as Nurse
- Alfonso Tomas as Nicola
- Renzo Ozzano as Soldier
- Angelo Pellegrino as Gay

== Release ==
The film was released in Italy on August 21, 1976.

== See also ==
- List of Italian films of 1976
