= Lo scippo =

1965 film

The Snatching
- Directed by: Nando Cicero
- Written by: Nando Cicero; Sandro Continenza
- Edited by: Maurizio Lucidi
- Music by: Piero Umiliani
- Release date: 1965
- Country: Italy
- Language: Italian

Lo scippo ('The snatching') is a 1965 Italian film. It marked the directorial debut of Nando Cicero.

== Plot ==
Speranza, a female company cashier, organizes with two young men with a motorcycle a snatching for stage a steal with money of customers. However, the bills are counterfeit because they have been changed out by Linzalone another bank's employee. But the money bag is unfortunely intercepted and steal to employee outside the bank by a couple of real thieves.

== Cast ==
- Paolo Ferrari
- Gabriele Ferzetti
- Fiorenzo Fiorentini
- Margaret Lee
- Didi Perego
- Mario Pisu : Frascà
- Maria Laura Rocca
- Enrico Maria Salerno : Linzalone
- Vinicio Sofia
- Annette Stroyberg
- Valeria Valeri : Speranza
