= Michele Gammino =

Italian voice actor

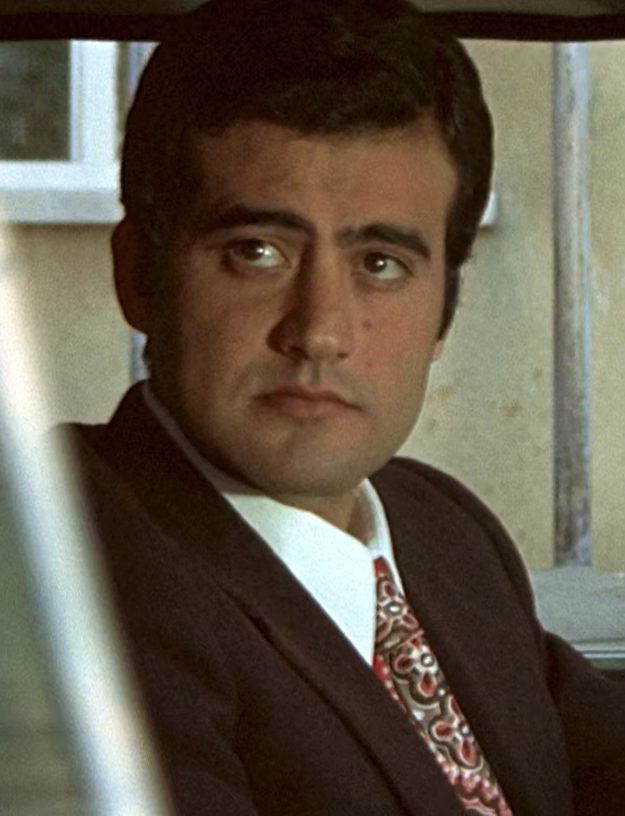
- Gammino in Confessions of a Police Captain (1971)
- Born: 16 June 1941 (age 85); Rome, Italy
- Occupations: Actor; voice actor; dubbing director; radio presenter; television presenter
- Years active: 1965–present
- Children: Roberto; Giampaolo
- Relatives: Letizia Scifoni (niece)

Michele Gammino (born 16 June 1941) is an Italian actor, voice actor and television presenter.

== Biography ==
Born in Rome to parents who originated from Palermo, Gammino began his career during the early 1970s. For his work on Italian television, Gammino has become famous on a number of occasions but mostly as presenter of Giochi senza frontiere, the Italian edition of Jeux sans frontières, which he co-hosted with Ettore Andenna and Milly Carlucci between 1979 and 1982. He also commentated for Italy at the 1980 Eurovision Song Contest. Gammino continued to act for television, he provided newly restored voices in a series of Italian films which include Le ragazze di Piazza di Spagna, Carabinieri 7, Una donna per amico, Linda e il brigadiere, Un medico in famiglia and the third season of I Cesaroni.

Gammino is probably best known in Italy for his roles in dubbing films into the Italian language. He is the primary Italian voice actor of Harrison Ford and Steven Seagal. He has even dubbed over 40 characters in films portrayed by actors such as Kevin Costner, Bill Murray, Jack Nicholson, Chevy Chase, Chazz Palminteri and Bob Hoskins. He also performed the Italian voice of James Bond in The Living Daylights and Licence to Kill which both starred Timothy Dalton as Bond.

In Gammino's animated roles, he dubbed the voices of Nando in Asterix and Cleopatra and Dr. Jekyll and Mr. Hyde in The Pagemaster. He also became the new voice of Morbo in Futurama after the death of Sandro Sardone in 2009. In the Disney period, he dubbed speaker of Goofy's shorts, Spyrus in the 2nd edition of the VHS Superstar Goofy and Walt Disney talking about action.

Since 2008, Gammino has been a presenter on Rai Radio 2.

=== Personal life ===
Gammino has two sons, Roberto, who is a voice actor, and Giampaolo, who is a dubbing director. His niece Letizia Scifoni is also a voice actress.

== Filmography ==
=== Cinema ===
Year	Title	Role(s)	Notes
1971	Confessions of a Police Captain	Gammino	
1971	In Prison Awaiting Trial	Don Paolo	
1972	The Sicilian Checkmate	Licata	
1973	Un ufficiale non si arrende	Captain Baisi	
1974	Commissariato di notturna	Brigadiere Frascà	
1974	Professore venga accompagnato dai suoi genitori	Professor Romanazzi	
1975	The Virgin Wife	Gianfranco Arrighini	
1975	Silent Action	Luigi Caprara	
1976	Confessions of a Lady Cop	Cecè	
1976	Coeds	Professor Finocchiaro	
1976	School Days	Baron Fifì Cacciapupolo	
1977	Taxi Girl	Walter	
1977	The Nurse on a Military Tour	Piras Gavino	
1977	The Virgo, the Taurus and the Capricorn	Raffaele	
1978	The Soldier with Great Maneuvers	Gianluca Capretti	
1981	Desirable Teacher	Professor Celani	
1982	Giovani, belle... probabilmente ricche	Gabriele	
1995	Mollo tutto	Franco Sola	
2001	Se lo fai sono guai	Carlo Nascimbene	
2008	Un'estate al mare		
2012	Young Europe	Alberto Marziani	
2013	Stay Away from Me		Uncredited
2017	Mr. Happiness	Rappresentante Sponsor	

=== Television ===
Year	Title	Role(s)	Notes
1998	Le ragazze di piazza di Spagna	Raffaele	Recurring role
1998	Una donna per amico		
2005	Il veterinario	Gualtiero Volterra	TV miniseries
2008	Carabinieri	Marcello Dei Casati	Recurring role (season 8)
2009	The Cesaronis	Carlotta’s father	1 episode (season 3x01)
2012	L'onore e il rispetto	Cupola Boss	4 episode (season 3)

== Voice work ==
Year	Title	Role(s)	Notes
1970	Formula 1 - Nell'inferno del Grand Prix	Narrator	Voice-over
1972	The Adventures of Pinocchio	Mangiafuoco	Animated film
1982	The Haunted House	Gaetano	Voice-over
2004	Mani pulite	Voice-over	Documentary
2010	Attraverso lo specchio	Voice-over	Documentary
2023	Bud Spencer & Terence Hill - Slaps and Beans 2	Terence Hill	Video game
2024	Degnità: aforismi, massime, postulati di una vita	Narrator ("Nocera Terinese" segment)	Short film

=== Dubbing ===
==== Films (Animation, Italian dub) ====
Year	Title	Role(s)	Ref
1968	Asterix and Cleopatra	Nando	
1978	Watership Down	Captain Holly	
1982	The Secret of NIMH	Farmer Fitzgibbons	
1991	Rock-a-Doodle	Chanticleer	
1994	The Pagemaster	Dr. Jekyll / Mr. Hyde	
1995	Memories	Nirasaki	
1996	All Dogs Go to Heaven 2	Red	
2004	Bionicle 2: Legends of Metru Nui	Turaga Dume	
2006	Paprika	Toshimi Konakawa	
2011	Arthur Christmas	Malcolm Claus	
2014	The Lego Movie	Pa Cop	
2019	The Secret Life of Pets 2	Rooster	
2019	Lady and the Tramp	Issac	
2020	Alien Xmas	Santa Claus	
2022	Lightyear	Emperor Zurg / Older Buzz	

==== Films (Live action, Italian dub) ====
Year	Title	Role(s)	Original actor	Ref
1967	The St. Valentine's Day Massacre	Dean O'Banion	John Agar	
1967	Monkeys, Go Home!	Marcel Cartucci	Bernard Woringer	
1969	That Splendid November	Sasà	André Lawrence	
1970	The Twelve Chairs	Ostap Bender	Frank Langella	
1970	Last Known Address	Greg	Michel Constantin	
1971	Drummer of Vengeance	The Stranger	Ty Hardin	
1972	The Godfather	Carlo Rizzi	Gianni Russo	
1974	Ransom	Ray Petrie	Ian McShane	
1975	Jaws	Leonard Hendricks	Jeffrey Kramer	
1976	The Cassandra Crossing	Haley	O. J. Simpson	
1976	Swindle	Tarcisio Pollaroli	Leo Gullotta	
1978	A Bridge Too Far	Robert Stout	Elliott Gould	
1978	Napoli... serenata calibro 9	Totonno 'O Pazzo	Nick Jordan	
1978	Stringimi forte papà	Andrea	Craig Hill	
1978	Goin' South	Henry Lloyd Moon	Jack Nicholson	
1978	Jaws 2	Leonard Hendricks	Jeffrey Kramer	
1980	The Blues Brothers	Bob	Jeff Morris	
1980	The Baltimore Bullet	Paulie	Michael Lerner	
1980	Ordinary People	Dr. Tyrone C. Berger	Judd Hirsch	
1981	Indiana Jones and the Raiders of the Lost Ark	Indiana Jones	Harrison Ford	
1981	The Postman Always Rings Twice	Frank Chambers	Jack Nicholson	
1981	Reds	Eugene O'Neill	Jack Nicholson	
1981	Shut Up When You Speak	Giacomo	Aldo Maccione	
1982	Blade Runner	Rick Deckard	Harrison Ford	
1982	The Border	Charlie Smith	Jack Nicholson	
1982	The Thing	R.J. MacReady	Kurt Russell	
1982	Missing	Ray Tower	Charles Cioffi	
1983	The World of Don Camillo	Don Camillo	Terence Hill	
1983	The Return of Martin Guerre	Martin Guerre	Gérard Depardieu	
1983	Silkwood	Morgan	Fred Ward	
1984	Terror in the Aisles	Jack Nicholson	Jack Nicholson	
1984	Double Trouble	Elliot Vance	Terence Hill	
1985	Fandango	Gardner Barnes	Kevin Costner	
1985	Marie	Charles Traughber	Morgan Freeman	
1985	Fletch	Irwin "Fletch" Fletcher	Chevy Chase	
1985	National Lampoon's European Vacation	Clark Griswold	Chevy Chase	
1985	Spies Like Us	Emmett Fitz-Hume	Chevy Chase	
1985	Miami Supercops	Doug Bennet / Jay Donell	Terence Hill	
1985	Day of the Dead	Henry Rhodes	Joseph Pilato	
1985	Rocky IV	Apollo Creed	Carl Weathers	
1985	The Goonies	Jake Fratelli	Robert Davi	
1986	Blue Velvet	Frank Booth	Dennis Hopper	
1986	The Texas Chainsaw Massacre 2	Boude "Lefty" Enright	Dennis Hopper	
1986	No Mercy	Eddie Jillette	Richard Gere	
1986	52 Pick-Up	Bobby Shy	Clarence Williams III	
1986	Iron Eagle	Charles "Chappy" Sinclair	Louis Gossett Jr.	
1986	Firewalker	Leo Porter	Louis Gossett Jr.	
1986	Top Gun	Tom "Stinger" Jardian	James Tolkan	
1986	The Fugitives	Jean Lucas	Gérard Depardieu	
1987	The Living Daylights	James Bond	Timothy Dalton	
1987	They Call Me Renegade	Luke	Terence Hill	
1987	Spaceballs	Colonel Sandurz	George Wyner	
1987	Near Dark	Jesse Hooker	Lance Henriksen	
1987	Street Smart	Leo Smalls, Jr. / Fast Black	Morgan Freeman	
1988	Who Framed Roger Rabbit	Eddie Valiant	Bob Hoskins	
1988	Action Jackson	Jericho "Action" Jackson	Carl Weathers	
1988	Frantic	Dr. Richard Walker	Harrison Ford	
1988	Funny Farm	Andy Farmer	Chevy Chase	
1988	Miles from Home	Frank Roberts, Jr.	Richard Gere	
1988	A Fish Called Wanda	George Thomason	Tom Georgeson	
1988	Zombi 3	Kenny	Deran Sarafian	
1988	Scrooged	Lee Majors	Lee Majors	
1988	Midnight Run	Tony Darvo	Richard Foronjy	
1988	Vibes	Nick Deezy	Jeff Goldblum	
1989	Jacknife	David "Dave" Flannigan	Ed Harris	
1989	Indiana Jones and the Last Crusade	Indiana Jones	Harrison Ford	
1989	Licence to Kill	James Bond	Timothy Dalton	
1989	Casualties of War	Lieutenant Reilly	Ving Rhames	
1989	Always	Al Yackey	John Goodman	
1989	Johnny Handsome	Rafe Garrett	Lance Henriksen	
1990	Dances with Wolves	John J. Dunbar	Kevin Costner	
1990	Goodfellas	Paulie Cicero	Paul Sorvino	
1990	Pretty Woman	Edward Lewis	Richard Gere	
1990	Arachnophobia	Delbert McClintock	John Goodman	
1990	Dick Tracy	Mumbles	Dustin Hoffman	
1990	Total Recall	Richter	Michael Ironside	
1990	Heart Condition	Jack Moony	Bob Hoskins	
1990	Presumed Innocent	Rusty Sabich	Harrison Ford	
1990	The Hot Spot	Harry Madox	Don Johnson	
1990	I Love You to Death	Harlan James	William Hurt	
1990	Quick Change	Grimm	Bill Murray	
1991	Highlander II: The Quickening	General Katana	Michael Ironside	
1991	Terminator 2: Judgment Day	Dr. Peter Silberman	Earl Boen	
1991	Regarding Henry	Henry Turner	Harrison Ford	
1991	What About Bob?	Bob Wiley	Bill Murray	
1991	Lucky Luke	Lucky Luke	Terence Hill	
1991	JFK	Jim Garrison	Kevin Costner	
1991	Hook	William Smee	Bob Hoskins	
1991	Shattered	Gus Klein	Bob Hoskins	
1991	The Rocketeer	Neville Sinclair	Timothy Dalton	
1991	Toy Soldiers	Dean Edward Parker	Louis Gossett Jr.	
1991	Bugsy	Count di Frasso	Giancarlo Scandiuzzi	
1992	A Few Good Men	Nathan R. Jessep	Jack Nicholson	
1992	Patriot Games	Jack Ryan	Harrison Ford	
1992	The Bodyguard	Frank Farmer	Kevin Costner	
1992	Army of Darkness	Ash Williams	Bruce Campbell	
1992	Army of Darkness	Evil Ash	Bruce Campbell	
1992	Under Siege	Casey Ryback	Steven Seagal	
1992	Deep Cover	Detective Taft	Clarence Williams III	
1992	Hero	Andy Farmer	Chevy Chase	
1992	Memoirs of an Invisible Man	Nick Halloway	Chevy Chase	
1992	Me and Veronica	Frankie	John Heard	
1992	The Babe	Babe Ruth	John Goodman	
1993	Geronimo: An American Legend	Geronimo	Wes Studi	
1993	Mr. Jones	Mr. Jones	Richard Gere	
1993	Groundhog Day	Phil Connors	Bill Murray	
1993	Mad Dog and Glory	Frank Milo	Bill Murray	
1993	Jurassic Park	Robert Muldoon	Bob Peck	
1993	The Firm	Wayne Tarrance	Ed Harris	
1993	Super Mario Bros.	Mario	Bob Hoskins	
1993	The Fugitive	Dr. Richard Kimble	Harrison Ford	
1993	A Perfect World	Robert "Butch" Haynes	Kevin Costner	
1993	Striking Distance	Jimmy Detillo	Robert Pastorelli	
1993	Philadelphia	Judge Lucas Garnett	Charles Napier	
1993	A Bronx Tale	Sonny	Chazz Palminteri	
1993	Guilty as Sin	David Greenhill	Don Johnson	
1994	On Deadly Ground	Forrest Taft	Steven Seagal	
1994	Clear and Present Danger	Jack Ryan	Harrison Ford	
1994	Jimmy Hollywood	Harrison Ford	Harrison Ford	
1994	Troublemakers	Travis	Terence Hill	
1994	Wolf	Will Randall	Jack Nicholson	
1994	Little Women	Friedrich Bhaer	Gabriel Byrne	
1994	Wyatt Earp	Wyatt Earp	Kevin Costner	
1994	The War	Stephen Simmons	Kevin Costner	
1994	A Good Man in Africa	Sam Adekunle	Louis Gossett Jr.	
1994	Blue Sky	Vince Johnson	Powers Boothe	
1995	Under Siege 2: Dark Territory	Casey Ryback	Steven Seagal	
1995	Waterworld	The Mariner	Kevin Costner	
1995	First Knight	Lancelot	Richard Gere	
1995	The Last Word	Ricky	Chazz Palminteri	
1995	The Perez Family	John Pirelli	Chazz Palminteri	
1995	Mute Witness	Aleksander Larsen	Oleg Yankovsky	
1995	Screamers	Joseph A. Hendricksson	Peter Weller	
1995	Sabrina	Linus Larrabee	Harrison Ford	
1995	Nixon	J. Edgar Hoover	Bob Hoskins	
1995	Jumanji	Homeless man	Lloyd Berry	
1995	Two Much	Gene	Danny Aiello	
1995	Seven	Dr. Beardsley	Richard Portnow	
1995	Heat	Sammy Casals	Wes Studi	
1996	Mulholland Falls	Detective Coolidge	Chazz Palminteri	
1996	Faithful	Tony	Chazz Palminteri	
1996	Executive Decision	Austin Travis	Steven Seagal	
1996	The Glimmer Man	Jack Cole	Steven Seagal	
1996	Larger than Life	Jack Corcoran	Bill Murray	
1996	The Juror	Louie Boffano	Tony Lo Bianco	
1996	Tin Cup	Roy "Tin Cup" McAvoy	Kevin Costner	
1997	As Good as It Gets	Melvin Udall	Jack Nicholson	
1997	Air Force One	President James Marshall	Harrison Ford	
1997	The Devil's Own	Tom O'Meara	Harrison Ford	
1997	Fire Down Below	Jack Taggert	Steven Seagal	
1997	The Postman	The Postman	Kevin Costner	
1997	The Man Who Knew Too Little	Wallace Ritchie	Bill Murray	
1997	The End of Violence	Ray Bering	Gabriel Byrne	
1997	Virtual Weapon	Skims	Terence Hill	
1997	Turbulence	Sam Bowen	Ben Cross	
1997	U Turn	Virgil Potter	Powers Boothe	
1998	Six Days, Seven Nights	Quinn Harris	Harrison Ford	
1998	Wild Things	Kenneth Bowden	Bill Murray	
1998	Rushmore	Herman Blume	Bill Murray	
1998	The Big Hit	Morton Shulman	Elliott Gould	
1998	American History X	Murray	Elliott Gould	
1998	The Patriot	Dr. Wesley McClaren	Steven Seagal	
1998	Blade	Abraham Whistler	Kris Kristofferson	
1998	The Man in the Iron Mask	Porthos	Gérard Depardieu	
1998	Star Trek: Insurrection	Ru'afo	F. Murray Abraham	
1998	Bulworth	Graham Crockett	Paul Sorvino	
1998	Wilbur Falls	Phillip Devereaux	Danny Aiello	
1999	Cradle Will Rock	Tommy Crickshaw	Bill Murray	
1999	Message in a Bottle	Garret Blake	Kevin Costner	
1999	For Love of the Game	Billy Chapel	Kevin Costner	
1999	Austin Powers: The Spy Who Shagged Me	Basil Exposition	Michael York	
1999	Random Hearts	Dutch Van Den Broeck	Harrison Ford	
1999	October Sky	John Hickam	Chris Cooper	
1999	Runaway Bride	Ike Graham	Richard Gere	
1999	The Bachelor	Dale Arden	Nicholas Pryor	
1999	Blue Streak	Detective Hardcastle	William Forsythe	
2000	What Planet Are You From?	Roland Jones	John Goodman	
2000	Animal Factory	James Decker	John Heard	
2000	What Lies Beneath	Dr. Norman Spencer	Harrison Ford	
2000	Charlie's Angels	John Bosley	Bill Murray	
2000	The Perfect Storm	Bob Brown	Michael Ironside	
2001	Exit Wounds	Orin Boyd	Steven Seagal	
2001	3000 Miles to Graceland	Thomas J. Murphy	Kevin Costner	
2002	Austin Powers in Goldmember	Basil Exposition	Michael York	
2002	K-19: The Widowmaker	Alexei Vostrikov	Harrison Ford	
2002	Half Past Dead	Sasha Petrosevitch	Steven Seagal	
2002	About Schmidt	Warren R. Schmidt	Jack Nicholson	
2003	Lara Croft: Tomb Raider – The Cradle of Life	Dr. Jonathan Reiss	Ciarán Hinds	
2003	Terminator 3: Rise of the Machines	Dr. Peter Silberman	Earl Boen	
2003	Underworld	Viktor	Bill Nighy	
2003	Hollywood Homicide	Joe Gavilan	Harrison Ford	
2003	Anger Management	Dr. Buddy Rydell	Jack Nicholson	
2003	Ruby & Quentin	Quentin	Gérard Depardieu	
2003	Bon Voyage	Jean-Étienne Beaufort	Gérard Depardieu	
2003	Mambo Italiano	Gino Barberini	Paul Sorvino	
2003	Identity	District Attorney	Marshall Bell	
2003	Sin	Eddie Burns	Ving Rhames	
2004	Eternal Sunshine of the Spotless Mind	Dr. Howard Mierzwiak	Tom Wilkinson	
2005	The Devil's Rejects	John Quincey Wydell	William Forsythe	
2005	The Jacket	Dr. Thomas Becker	Kris Kristofferson	
2005	Transamerica	Murray Schupak	Burt Young	
2005	Unleashed	Bart	Bob Hoskins	
2005	The Upside of Anger	Denny Davies	Kevin Costner	
2005	Rumor Has It	Beau Burroughs	Kevin Costner	
2005	Capote	Alvin Dewey	Chris Cooper	
2005	The Exorcism of Emily Rose	Father Richard Moore	Tom Wilkinson	
2005	The Lost City	The Writer	Bill Murray	
2005	The Interpreter	Jay Pettigrew	Sydney Pollack	
2006	The Good German	Colonel Muller	Beau Bridges	
2006	Firewall	Jack Stanfield	Harrison Ford	
2006	Shadow Man	Jack Foster	Steven Seagal	
2006	Attack Force	Marshall Lawson	Steven Seagal	
2006	Little Man	Mr. Walken	Chazz Palminteri	
2006	Underworld: Evolution	Viktor	Bill Nighy	
2006	Zoom	Dr. Ed Grant	Chevy Chase	
2006	The Guardian	Ben Randall	Kevin Costner	
2006	The Last Kiss	Stephen	Tom Wilkinson	
2007	Sweeney Todd: The Demon Barber of Fleet Street	Judge Turpin	Alan Rickman	
2007	The Bucket List	Edward Perriman Cole	Jack Nicholson	
2007	Michael Clayton	Marty Bach	Sydney Pollack	
2007	Flight of Fury	John Sands	Steven Seagal	
2007	Urban Justice	Simon Ballister	Steven Seagal	
2008	Last Chance Harvey	Harvey Shine	Dustin Hoffman	
2008	Indiana Jones and the Kingdom of the Crystal Skull	Indiana Jones	Harrison Ford	
2008	Get Smart	Agent 13	Bill Murray	
2008	Doomsday	Bill Nelson	Bob Hoskins	
2008	Made of Honor	Thomas Bailey, Sr.	Sydney Pollack	
2008	Saw V	Police Chief	Al Sapienza	
2009	Underworld: Rise of the Lycans	Viktor	Bill Nighy	
2009	Crossing Over	Max Brogan	Harrison Ford	
2009	Brüno	Harrison Ford	Harrison Ford	
2009	Driven to Kill	Ruslan Drachev	Steven Seagal	
2009	Against the Dark	Tao	Steven Seagal	
2009	The Keeper	Rolland Sallinger	Steven Seagal	
2009	A Dangerous Man	Shane Daniels	Steven Seagal	
2010	All Good Things	Sanford Marks	Frank Langella	
2010	Extraordinary Measures	Robert Stonehill	Harrison Ford	
2010	The Conspirator	Reverdy Johnson	Tom Wilkinson	
2010	How Do You Know	Charles Madison	Jack Nicholson	
2010	Machete	Rogelio Torrez	Steven Seagal	
2010	Born to Raise Hell	Robert Samuels	Steven Seagal	
2010	Sarah's Key	Édouard Tezac	Michel Duchaussoy	
2010	The Tourist	Chief Inspector Jones	Timothy Dalton	
2011	The Green Hornet	James Reid	Tom Wilkinson	
2011	Captain America: The First Avenger	Senator Brandt	Michael Brandon	
2011	Just Go with It	Adon	Kevin Nealon	
2011	Tower Heist	Mr. Simon	Judd Hirsch	
2011	J. Edgar	Kenneth McKellar	Michael O'Neill	
2012	The Dark Knight Rises	U.S. President	William Devane	
2012	Ruby Sparks	Dr. Rosenthal	Elliott Gould	
2012	A Dark Truth	Doug Calder	Al Sapienza	
2013	Man of Steel	Jonathan Kent	Kevin Costner	
2013	42	Branch Rickey	Harrison Ford	
2013	Paranoia	Jock Goddard	Harrison Ford	
2013	Ender's Game	Colonel Hyrum Graff	Harrison Ford	
2013	Anchorman 2: The Legend Continues	Mack Tannen	Harrison Ford	
2014	Interstellar	Williams	William Devane	
2014	The Expendables 3	Max Drummer	Harrison Ford	
2014	3 Days to Kill	Ethan Renner	Kevin Costner	
2014	Black or White	Elliot Anderson	Kevin Costner	
2014	Selma	Frank Minis Johnson	Martin Sheen	
2014	Grace of Monaco	Father Francis Tucker	Frank Langella	
2014	The Grand Budapest Hotel	The Author	Tom Wilkinson	
2015	The Age of Adaline	William Jones	Harrison Ford	
2015	Star Wars: Episode VII – The Force Awakens	Han Solo	Harrison Ford	
2015	Vacation	Clark Griswold	Chevy Chase	
2016	Garm Wars: The Last Druid	Wydd 256	Lance Henriksen	
2016	Batman v Superman: Dawn of Justice	Jonathan Kent	Kevin Costner	
2016	Rules Don't Apply	Vernon Scott	Paul Sorvino	
2017	The Foreigner	Liam Hennessy	Pierce Brosnan	
2017	Blade Runner 2049	Rick Deckard	Harrison Ford	
2017	Just Getting Started	Duke Diver	Morgan Freeman	
2017	Molly's Game	Larry Bloom	Kevin Costner	
2018	The Nutcracker and the Four Realms	Drosselmeyer	Morgan Freeman	
2019	The Last Laugh	Al Hart	Chevy Chase	
2019	Godzilla: King of the Monsters	Alan Jonah	Charles Dance	
2019	Star Wars: Episode IX – The Rise of Skywalker	Han Solo	Harrison Ford	
2019	Dumbo	J. Griffin Remington	Alan Arkin	
2019	The Highwaymen	Frank Hamer	Kevin Costner	
2020	The Call of the Wild	John Thornton	Harrison Ford	
2020	Let Him Go	George Blackledge	Kevin Costner	
2021	The French Dispatch	Arthur Howitzer Jr.	Bill Murray	
2021	Coming 2 America	Morgan Freeman	Morgan Freeman	
2021	Black Box	Philippe Rénier	André Dussollier	
2022	The Greatest Beer Run Ever	The Colonel	Bill Murray	
2023	Indiana Jones and the Dial of Destiny	Indiana Jones	Harrison Ford	
2023	Ant-Man and the Wasp: Quantumania	Lord Krylar	Bill Murray	
2023	Killers of the Flower Moon	Pitts Beatty	Gene Jones	
2023	Oppenheimer	James B. Conant	Steve Coulter	
2023	A Good Person	Daniel	Morgan Freeman	
2023	57 Seconds	Anton Burrell	Morgan Freeman	
2023	Rustin	A. Philip Randolph	Glynn Turman	

==== Television (Animation, Italian dub) ====
Year	Title	Role(s)	Notes	Ref
1993–1995	The Animals of Farthing Wood	Fox	Main cast	
1995–1997	Gargoyles	Coldstone	Recurring role	
1999–present	Futurama	Mayor Poopenmeyer	Recurring role (seasons 1–4)	
1999–present	Futurama	Donbot	Recurring role (seasons 2–3)	
1999–present	Futurama	Richard Nixon's head	Recurring role (season 5)	
1999–present	Futurama	Morbo	Recurring role (season 6+)	
2001	Invincible Steel Man Daitarn 3	Sandrake	2nd edition (2001)	
2010	Demon Lord Dante	Sasuke	Manga edition (2001)	
2017–2019	Mickey and the Roadster Racers	Dr. Waddleton Crutchley	2 episodes	
2019–present	Blue Eye Samurai	Master Eiji	Main cast	

==== Television (Live action, Italian dub) ====
Year	Title	Role(s)	Notes	Original actor	Ref
1977	Jesus of Nazareth	Saint Peter	TV miniseries	James Farentino	
1983	Bare Essence	Niko Theophilus	Main cast	Ian McShane	
1983–1986	Baretta	Tony Baretta	Main cast	Robert Blake	
1992	Lucky Luke	Lucky Luke	Main cast	Terence Hill	
1996	Escape Clause	Gil Farrand	TV film	Paul Sorvino	
2000	Songs in Ordinary Time	Omar Duvall	TV film	Beau Bridges	
2003	Recipe for Disaster	Patrick Korda	TV film	John Larroquette	
2003–2012	CSI: Miami	Frank Tripp	Main cast	Rex Linn	
2006	Pumpkinhead: Ashes to Ashes	Ed Harley	TV film	Lance Henriksen	
2008–2009	Las Vegas	A.J. Cooper	Main cast (season 5)	Tom Selleck	
2008–2014	Merlin	Uther Pendragon	Main cast	Anthony Head	
2011	Chuck	Alexei Volkoff	6 episodes (season 4)	Timothy Dalton	
2011–2013	True Justice	Elijah Kane	Main cast	Steven Seagal	
2011–2013	Game of Thrones	Jeor Mormont	12 episodes	James Cosmo	
2012–2021	Last Man Standing	Mike Baxter	Main cast	Tim Allen	
2013–2016	The Big Bang Theory	Mike Rostenkowski	Recurring role (seasons 6–9)	Casey Sander	
2016	The Grinder	Dean Sanderson Sr	Main cast	William Devane	
2016–2018	Ash vs Evil Dead	Ash Williams	Main cast	Bruce Campbell	

==== Video games (Italian dub) ====
Year	Title	Role(s)	Ref
1997	Blade Runner	Ray McCoy	
1999	Indiana Jones and the Infernal Machine	Indiana Jones	
2009	Ghostbusters: The Video Game	Peter Venkman	
2016	Lego Star Wars: The Force Awakens	Han Solo	
