= Il casinista =

1980 film

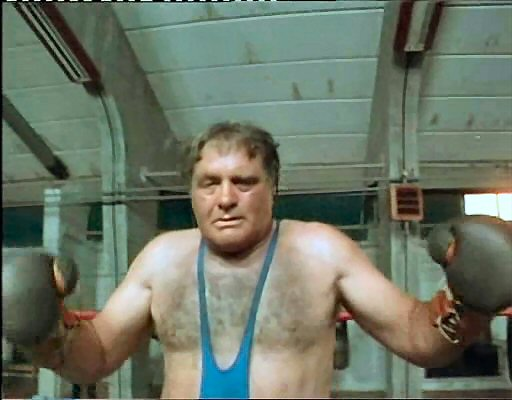
Screenshot from dal film Il Casinista

Il casinista is a 1980 Italian comedy film directed by Pier Francesco Pingitore. It stars Pippo Franco, Renzo Montagnani, Bombolo, and Simona Mariani.
