= Cornetti alla crema =

1981 film by Sergio Martino

- Italian theatrical release poster by Enzo Sciotti
- Directed by: Sergio Martino
- Written by: Romolo Guerrieri (story and screenplay); Franco Verucci (story and screenplay); Sergio Martino (screenplay)
- Produced by: Luciano Martino
- Starring: Edwige Fenech; Lino Banfi; Gianni Cavina; Milena Vukotic
- Cinematography: Giancarlo Ferrando
- Music by: Detto Mariano
- Distributed by: Medusa Produzione
- Release date: 12 September 1981 (Italy)
- Running time: 93 min.
- Language: Italian

Cornetti alla crema a.k.a. Cream Horn and Creampuffs is a 1981 Italian sex comedy film, directed by Sergio Martino.

Edwige Fenech, Lino Banfi and Milena Vukotic are featured in a comedic tale about a couple attempting to elude the woman's jealous boyfriend, a professional football player, as well as the man's wife.

== Plot ==
Italy, 1980s. Domenico (Lino Banfi), a tailor who tailors clothes to fit priests and prelates, married and a father, meets the glamorous and prosperous Marianna (Edwige Fenech), an aspiring opera singer. Attracted by the beauty of the girl, he tries to seduce her.

== Cast ==
- Lino Banfi: Domenico Petruzzelli
- Edwige Fenech: Marianna Tribalzi
- Gianni Cavina: Gabriele Arcangeli
- Milena Vukotic: Elena
- Marisa Merlini: Marianna's mother
- Armando Brancia: Eminenza
- Maurizio Tocchi: Ulrico
- Luigi Leoni: Don Giacinto
- Michela Miti: Una Squillo

== Release ==
The film was released in Italy on 12 September 1981
