= Paulo Roberto Cotechiño centravanti di sfondamento =

- Italian theatrical release poster by Enzo Sciotti
- Directed by: Nando Cicero
- Written by: Nando Cicero; Luciano Martino; Francesco Milizia
- Starring: Carmen Russo; Alvaro Vitali
- Cinematography: Federico Zanni
- Edited by: Alberto Moriani
- Music by: Ubaldo Continiello
- Production companies: Medusa; Nuova Dania
- Distributed by: Medusa Distribuzione
- Release date: September 2, 1983 (Italy)
- Running time: 88 minutes
- Country: Italy
- Language: Italian

Paulo Roberto Cotechiño centravanti di sfondamento (Lady Football) is a 1983 Italian comedy film written and directed by Nando Cicero and starring Alvaro Vitali.

== Plot ==
In Italy in the early 1980s, a Brazilian football ace (an idol for the Naples fans) is afflicted by nostalgia for his country and for his beautiful girlfriend.

== Cast ==
- Alvaro Vitali as Paulo Roberto Cotechiño
- Carmen Russo as Lucelia
- Mario Carotenuto as Uncle Mario
- Cristiano Censi as Marzotti
- Vittorio Marsiglia as Peppino Mergellina
- Bobby Rhodes as Mandingo
- Tiberio Murgia as Head of Brigades
- Franca Valeri as Countess
- Gian Carlo Fusco as Trombetti
- Enzo Andronico as Tancredi Cafiero
- Moana Pozzi as Cotechino's Wooer
- Alfonso Tomas as Referee

== Release ==
The film was released in Italy on September 2, 1983.

== See also ==
- List of Italian films of 1983
