= Nando Cicero =

Italian film director, screenwriter and actor

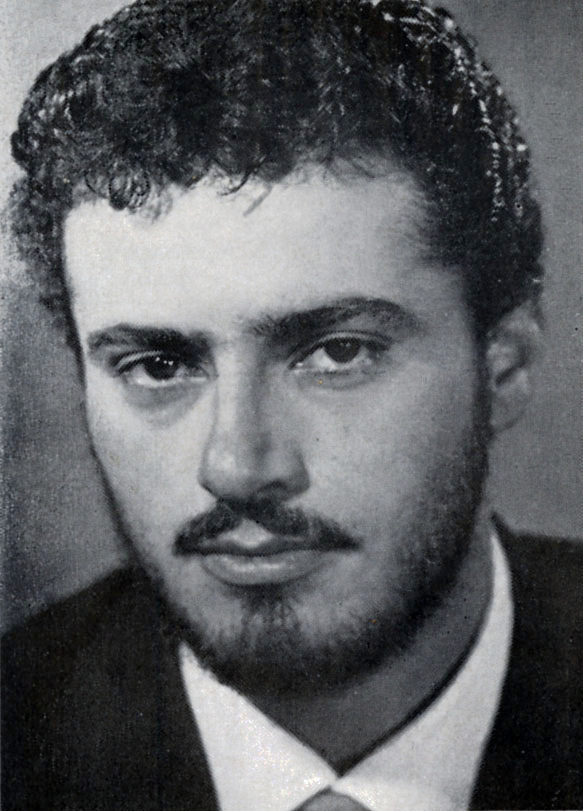
- Born: Fernando Cicero; 22 January 1931; Asmara, Italian Eritrea
- Died: 30 July 1995 (aged 64); Rome, Italy
- Occupation: film director

Fernando Cicero, better known as Nando Cicero (22 January 1931 – 30 July 1995), was an Italian film director, screenwriter and actor.

Born in Asmara, Cicero debuted as an actor, working with directors such as Luchino Visconti (Senso, 1953), Roberto Rossellini (Vanina Vanini, 1961), Francesco Rosi (Salvatore Giuliano, 1962) and Alberto Lattuada (The Steppe, 1962). He starred in eleven films between 1953 and 1962, always in supporting roles. After his directorial debut with Lo scippo he directed three Spaghetti Western films ( Professionals for a Massacre, Last of the Badmen, and Twice a Judas). From 1970 he focused on comedy genre, directing some parody films starred by Franco and Ciccio. Starting with The School Teacher Cicero established himself as one of the most important and successful directors of the commedia sexy all'italiana film genre. Following the decline of the genre, he retired in 1983; his last film was Paulo Roberto Cotechino, starring Alvaro Vitali and Carmen Russo. He died in 1995 at age 64.

== Filmography ==
Director

- Lo scippo (1965)
- Last of the Badmen (1967)
- Red Blood, Yellow Gold (1967)
- Shoot Twice (1969)
- Ma chi t'ha dato la patente? (1970)
- Armiamoci e partite! (1971)
- Ku-Fu? Dalla Sicilia con furore (1973)
- The Last Italian Tango (1973)
- Bella, ricca, lieve difetto fisico, cerca anima gemella (1973)
- The School Teacher (1975)
- Il gatto mammone (1975)
- The Lady Medic (1976)
- The Nurse on a Military Tour (1977)
- The Soldier with Great Maneuvers (1978)
- La liceale, il diavolo e l'acquasanta (1979)
- L'assistente sociale tutto pepe (1981)
- W la foca (1982)
- Paulo Roberto Cotechiño centravanti di sfondamento (1983)

Actor

Year	Title	Role	Notes
1954	Senso	Un soldato	Uncredited
1954	Folgore Division	Enrico Damiani	
1955	Andrea Chénier		
1955	Il campanile d'oro		
1956	Roland the Mighty	Oliviero	
1957	El Alamein		Uncredited
1959	Hercules Unchained	Lastene	
1959	L'inferno addosso	The young Police Commissioner	
1961	Legge di guerra		
1961	Vanina Vanini	Saverio Pontini	
1962	Salvatore Giuliano	Bandit	Uncredited, (final film role)
