= Fiorenzo Fiorentini =

Italian composer (1920–2003)

- Fiorentini in Teresa the Thief (1973)
- Born: 10 April 1920; Rome, Italy
- Died: 27 March 2003 (aged 82); Rome, Italy
- Occupation: Actor
- Children: Roberta Fiorentini

Fiorenzo Fiorentini (10 April 1920 – 27 March 2003) was an Italian actor, author, composer, screenwriter and radio personality.

== Life and career ==
Born in Rome, Fiorentini began his career as an author and radio actor, creating many successful macchiette (comic monologues caricaturing stock characters). He made his stage debut in 1954, in the revue Tutto fa Broadway. He later focused his stage activity on plays and shows related to Roman culture, often collaborating with Mario Scaccia. In 1980, he founded the Ettore Petrolini Study Centre in Rome.

Fiorentini appeared in numerous films, mostly comedies, sometimes even collaborating on the screenplays. He was also a television author and actor, a singer and a successful composer. He died from the after-effects of an intracerebral hemorrhage.

== Partial filmography ==
- Maracatumba... ma non è una rumba! (1949) - sor du fodere', l'intrattenitore
- Anthony of Padua (1949, writer)
- Viva il cinema! (1952) - Tonino
- A Mother Returns (1952, writer)
- Giovinezza (1952, writer)
- Good Folk's Sunday (1953) - Vincenzo
- Ci troviamo in galleria (1953) - Pippo
- Café chantant (1953) - Se stesso / Himself
- Cento serenate (1954) - Don Alfonso detto Fofò
- Le vacanze del sor Clemente (1955) - Mr. Cheri
- I pinguini ci guardano (1956)
- The Traffic Policeman (1960) - Padre di Otello (voice, uncredited)
- Paris, My Love (1962) - Claudio Nesti
- Carmen di Trastevere (1962) - Carmen's Guitar Player
- Canzoni a tempo di twist (1962)
- The Monk of Monza (1963) - Smilzo, un bravo
- Gli onorevoli (1963) - Professore
- I ragazzi dell'hully-gully (1964)
- Lo scippo (1965)
- How We Robbed the Bank of Italy (1966) - Romoletto, detto 'Il Genio del Male'
- Non faccio la guerra, faccio l'amore (1966)
- The Tiger and the Pussycat (1967) - Tazio
- Soldati e capelloni (1967) - Direttore del locale notturno
- Play-Boy (1967) - Tailor
- Mr. Kinky (1968) - Luigi
- Donne... botte e bersaglieri (1968) - Porter
- The Black Sheep (1968) - Bertieri
- The Two Crusaders (1968) - Ciccio counselor
- Il ragazzo che sorride (1969) - House-painter
- Zenabel (1969) - Cecco
- Gli infermieri della mutua (1969) - Marchese Renostowski
- Oh dolci baci e languide carezze (1970)
- La ragazza del prete (1970)
- I due maggiolini più matti del mondo (1970) - Il Giglio
- Er Più – storia d'amore e di coltello (1971) - Ignazio, il 'frascataro'
- Storia di fifa e di coltello - Er seguito d'er più (1972) - Er Frascataro
- Anche se volessi lavorare, che faccio? (1972) - Pasquina's Uncle
- La Tosca (1973) - Spoletta
- Teresa the Thief (1973) - Alvaro - Ciancastorta
- La notte dell'ultimo giorno (1973)
- Buona parte di Paolina (1973)
- Farfallon (1974) - Leonardo
- Tutto in comune (1974)
- Che notte quella notte! (1977) - Bernardino
- The Nurse on a Military Tour (1977) - Warrant Officer at the depot
- Ride bene... chi ride ultimo (1977) - Cardinal (segment "Prete per forza")
- Last Feelings (1978) - Anselmo
- Tanto va la gatta al lardo... (1978) - Friend of Dino / Oreste
- Ridendo e scherzando (1978) - Peppino
- Ciao cialtroni! (1979)
- L'assistente sociale tutto pepe (1981) - 'Monsignore'
- La Storia (1986, TV Movie) - Cucchiarelli
- Captain Fracassa's Journey (1990) - Pietro
- Only You (1994) - Old Man
- Un bugiardo in paradiso (1998)
- The Missing (1999) - Cardinal Valetti
- Gente di Roma (2003)
