= Commedia sexy all'italiana =

Italian film genre

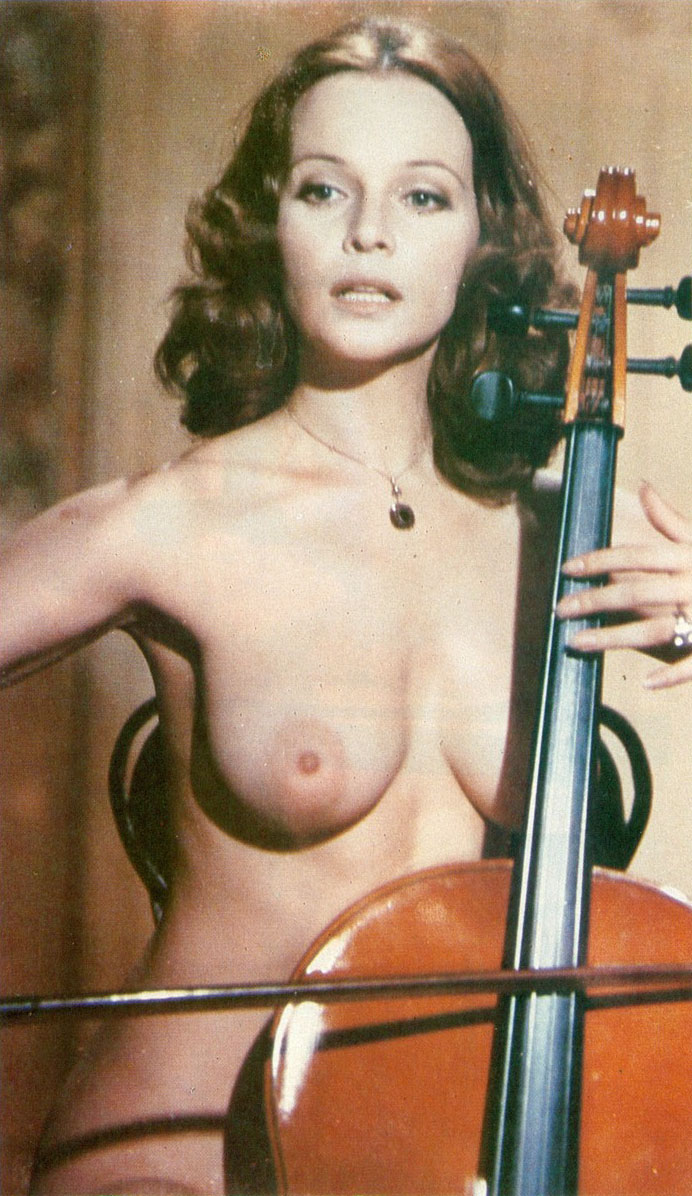
- Laura Antonelli in one of the commedia sexy's most iconic scenes, from Secret Fantasy (1971)
- Years active: 1970s–early 1980s
- Location: Italy
- Major figures: Actresses: Edwige Fenech, Barbara Bouchet, Laura Antonelli, Nadia Cassini and Gloria Guida Actors: Lando Buzzanca, Lino Banfi, Carlo Giuffrè, Pippo Franco, Alvaro Vitali, and Renzo Montagnani; Directors: Pasquale Festa Campanile, Mariano Laurenti, Sergio Martino, Nando Cicero Producers: Luciano Martino
- Influences: Commedia all'italiana

The commedia sexy all'italiana (Italian: [komˈmɛːdja ˈsɛksi allitaˈljaːna], lit. "sex comedy Italian style"), also known as commedia scollacciata ("low-cut comedy") or commedia erotica all'italiana, is a subgenre of the Italian commedia all'italiana film genre.

== Style ==
Commedia sexy is characterized typically by abundant female nudity, male nudity, and comedy, and by the minimal weight given to social criticism that was the basic ingredient of the main commedia all'italiana genre. Stories are often set in affluent environments such as wealthy households. It is closely connected to the sexual revolution, and it was something extremely new and innovative for that period. For the first time, films with female nudity could be watched at the cinema. Pornography and scenes of explicit sex were still forbidden in Italian cinemas, but partial nudity was somewhat tolerated. The genre has been described as a cross between bawdy comedy and humorous erotic film with ample slapstick elements which follows more or less clichéd storylines.

== History ==
=== Roots ===
This subgenre has its roots in several different series of films. The mondo film genre popularized nudity, shifting the limits of what could be shown in the Italian cinema. A series of successful commedia all'italiana of the sixties (such as Pietro Germi's Signore & Signori (1966) and Dino Risi's Vedo nudo (1969)) focused on Italian hypocrisy and shame about sexual taboos, popularizing sex-based plots.

=== Main era ===
The commedia sexy was very successful commercially between the 1970s and early 1980s, although it was generally panned by critics (with a few exceptions such as several comedies starring Lando Buzzanca), and then declined when female nudity became common in Italian mainstream cinema, television and magazines, and when pornographic films became more widely available.

==== The decamerotici (1971–1975) ====
Pier Paolo Pasolini's Trilogy of Life (consisting of The Decameron (1971), Canterbury Tales (1972) and Arabian Nights (1974), and inspired by the tales of Giovanni Boccaccio's Decameron, Geoffrey Chaucer's The Canterbury Tales and the One Thousand and One Nights) contained nudity and sex-based plots. However, Pasolini's Trilogy of Life is not an example of commedia sexy all'italiana because, despite its erotic content, it is rooted in literary adaptation and ideological critique rather than the commercialized, formulaic humor and titillation typical of the commedia sexy all'italiana genre. That being said, Pasolini’s trilogy did inspire the commedia sexy all'italiana indirectly, as its success helped popularize erotic themes and period settings, which commercial filmmakers then imitated and exaggerated in a more vulgar, comedic, and less intellectual style typical of the genre. The success of these films and the relaxation of Italian censors in the late 1960s and early 1970s, paved the way for dozens of soft-core productions set in medieval or Renaissance times, collectively known as decamerotici (singular: decamerotico; alternative terms include decameronico and decamerone, as well as boccaccesco). The wave of decamerotici lasted from 1971 (starting with In Love, Every Pleasure Has Its Pain) until the end of 1975, with an early peak in 1972. In total, about 50 decamerotici were produced.

==== Subgenres ====
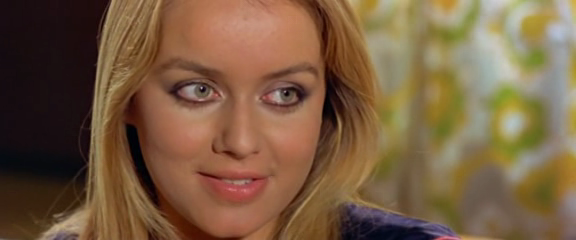
Gloria Guida, one of the commedia sexy's icons, here in La liceale (1975), a title from the "high school comedy" subgenre

Other very popular subgenres (Italian: sottofiloni) of the commedia sexy all'italiana included high school (Italian: scolastica), military (Italian: militare), hospital (Italian: ospedaliera), police (Italian: poliziottesca) and family comedies (Italian: familiare).

== Actors ==
The commedia sexy launched the careers of several actresses, including Edwige Fenech, commonly considered the quintessential star of the genre; María Baxa and Gloria Guida, the staple lead actress of coming-of-age films and the popular La liceale series in the mid-1970s; and Nadia Cassini who was promoted as a successor to Fenech in the late 1970s. Many actresses who had gained earlier success in other genres moved to commedia sexy and became well known within the genre, such as Femi Benussi in the mid-1970s and Barbara Bouchet in the late 1970s. The glamour models Anna Maria Rizzoli and Carmen Russo also followed this route in the early 1980s, a period when the genre was starting to fade in popularity.

The genre is also identified with a number of prominent male comedians and actors, including Lando Buzzanca, Lino Banfi, Carlo Giuffrè, Pippo Franco, Alvaro Vitali, and Renzo Montagnani.

== See also ==
- Category:Commedia sexy all'italiana films in the genre
- Argentine "comedia picaresca" – a similar genre in Argentinian cinema that also peaked between the 1970s and 1980s.
- Mexican "sexicomedias" – a similar genre in Mexican cinema that also peaked between the 1970s and 1980s.
- Nudity in film
- Pornochanchada – a Brazilian sex comedy genre
- Sex comedy
