= Giannetto De Rossi =

Italian make-up artist (1942–2021)

- Born: 8 August 1942; Rome, Italy
- Died: 11 April 2021 (aged 78); Rome, Italy
- Occupations: Makeup and special effects artist

Giannetto De Rossi (8 August 1942 – 11 April 2021) was an Italian makeup and special effects artist for motion pictures. His career included work for several high-profile directors, including Bernardo Bertolucci, Sergio Leone, Federico Fellini, Franco Zeffirelli, and David Lynch; as well as collaborations with cult filmmakers Lucio Fulci and Alexandre Aja. He was known particularly for his highly detailed and realistic prosthetic appliances, most visible in his horror output. He was nominated for the BAFTA Award for Best Special Effects for the Oscar-winning The Last Emperor (1987).

== Early career ==
One of his first special FX roles was as a make-up artist for Joe D'Amato, whose film Emanuelle in America required detailed special FX for the notorious snuff film sequences. The gruesome effects produced by De Rossi, which included a woman's breasts being hacked off and multiple floggings, were so convincing that many thought them real snuff film scenes, and one actress complained that she had been traumatised by the effects.

== International fame ==
Early in his career, De Rossi worked with a number of well-known Italian directors, including Sergio Leone and Federico Fellini. A particularly notable collaboration was with Lucio Fulci on his horror film Zombi 2. De Rossi also worked with Fulci in three other films: City of the Living Dead, The Beyond and The House by the Cemetery.

== Hollywood fame ==
Dino De Laurentiis hired De Rossi to create the on-set practical effects for two films in Mexico which he was producing, Dune and Conan the Destroyer. De Rossi created a number of memorable effects in the two films, including the fetus-shaped Spice Guild Navigator seen floating in a tank in Dune and the Dagoth monster suit worn by André the Giant in Conan the Destroyer.

In the late 1980s, he created the special makeup effects on Rambo III. For the scene in which Rambo heals himself by igniting gunpowder inside of a torso bullet wound, De Rossi rigged a device which caused flame to burst from both Sylvester Stallone's stomach and back at once. Stallone was so impressed by De Rossi's work that he hired him again for the make-up effects for Daylight, which was shot in Rome and put Stallone's son Sage Stallone in contact with Lucio Fulci.

De Rossi created the title monster in the film Killer Crocodile, and directed the film's sequel, Killer Crocodile 2.

He is also notable as the designer of the mask used in the film The Man in the Iron Mask.

== Later years ==
De Rossi continued creating FX for both Italian and American cinema, until his death on 11 April 2021 (coincidentally the same day as fellow Lucio Fulci collaborator Enzo Sciotti).

== Filmography (makeup artist and special effects) ==
- Obiettivo ragazze (1963)
- Le ore della'amore (The Hours of Love) (1963)
- Cadavere per signora (Corpse for the Lady) (1964)
- I maniaci (The Maniacs) (1964)
- Io, io, io...e gli altri (Me, Me, Me...and the Others) (1966)
- Svegliati e uccidi Wake Up and Die (1966)
- La donna del lago (The Possessed) (1965)
- The Taming of the Shrew (1967)
- C'era una volta il West (Once Upon a Time in the West) (1968)
- Waterloo (1970)
- Quando le donne avevano la coda (When Women Had Tails) (1970)
- The Invincible Six (1970)
- Quando gli uomini armarono la clava e...con le donne fecero din-don (When Men Carried Clubs and Women Played Ding-Dong a.k.a. When Women Played Ding Dong) (1971)
- II prode Anselmo e il suo scudiero (1972)
- La più bella serata della mia vita (1972)
- Nonostante le apparenze... e purché la nazione non lo sappia... all'onorevole piacciono le donne (The Eroticist) (1972)
- The Valachi Papers (1972)
- Ash Wednesday (1973)
- Valdez, il mezzosangue (Chino) (1973)
- Non si deve profanare il sonno dei morti (No profanar el sueno de los muertos a.k.a. The Living Dead at Manchester Morgue a.k.a. Let Sleeping Corpses Lie a.k.a. Don't Open the Window a.k.a. Do No Speak III of the Dead) (1974)
- Mussolini: Ultimo atto (The Last 4 Days) (1974)
- Il Casanova di Federico Fellini (Fellini's Casanova) (1976)
- Cattivi pensieri (1976)
- Novecento (1900)(1976)
- Emanuelle in America (1977)
- King of the Gypsies (1978)
- Zombi 2 (Zombie a.k.a. Zombie Flesh Eaters) (1979)
- L'umanoide (The Humanoid) (1979)
- Zombi Holocaust (Zombie Holocaust a.k.a. Dr. Butcher M.D.) (1980)
- Apocalypse domani (Cannibal Apocalypse a.k.a. Cannibals in the Streets a.k.a. Invasion of the Fleshhunters) (1980)
- City of the Living Dead (a.k.a. The Gates of Hell) (1980)
- Cannibal Ferox (1981)
- Le Notti Del Terrore (a.k.a. Burial Ground) (1981)
- Quella villa accanto al cimitero (The House by the Cemetery) (1981)
- E tu vivrai nel terrore-L'aldila (The Beyond a.k.a. Seven Doors of Death) (1981)
- Piranha II: The Spawning (1981)
- I predatori di Atlantide (The Atlantis Interceptors a.k.a. Atlantis Inferno) (1983)
- La traviata (1983)
- State buoni se potete (1984)
- Dune (1984)
- Conan the Destroyer (1984)
- Rambo III (1988)
- Killer Crocodile (1989)
- Dr. M (1990)
- The Inner Circle (1991)
- Catherine the Great (1995)(TV)
- Daylight (1996)
- Dragonheart (1996)
- Kull the Conqueror (1997)
- The Man in the Iron Mask (1998)
- Asterix et Obelix contre Cesar (1999)
- Vatel (2000)
- Harrison's Flowers (2000)
- Uprising (2001) (TV)
- Amici ahrarara (2001)
- Haute Tension (High Tension) (2003)
- Modigliani (2004)
- Ring of the Nibelungs (2004)(German TV)
- The Last Legion (2007)
- Pompei (2007) TV mini-series
- Christopher Roth (2010)

== Filmography (director and writer) ==
- Tummy (1995)
- Killer Crocodile 2 (1990)
- Cyborg - Il guerriero d'acciaio (1989)
