= La liceale, il diavolo e l'acquasanta =

1979 film by Nando Cicero

- Italian theatrical release poster
- Directed by: Nando Cicero
- Starring: Gloria Guida; Lino Banfi
- Music by: Ubaldo Continiello
- Release date: 1979
- Country: Italy
- Language: Italian

La liceale, il diavolo e l'acquasanta (The high school student, the devil and the holy water) is a 1979 commedia sexy all'italiana directed by Nando Cicero. It is the fourth chapter in the "Liceale" film-series and the last starred by Gloria Guida. Unlike the previous films, it is an anthology film in which the three main actors of the series (Gloria Guida, Lino Banfi and Alvaro Vitali) star in three separate segments.

== Cast ==
- Gloria Guida: Luna
- Lino Banfi: Lino
- Alvaro Vitali: Carmelo Petralia
- Pippo Santonastaso: Pupù, the Devil
- Maria Luisa Serena: Rosaria
- Alberto Ercolani (alias Claudio Saint-Just): Ciclamino
- Tiberio Murgia: Commendatore
- Salvatore Baccaro: the primeval man

== Related films ==
- La liceale (1975)
- La liceale nella classe dei ripetenti (1978)
- La liceale seduce i professori (1979)
- La liceale al mare con l'amica di papà (1980), without Gloria Guida
