= Carmen Russo =

Reality television personality, singer, actress, dancer

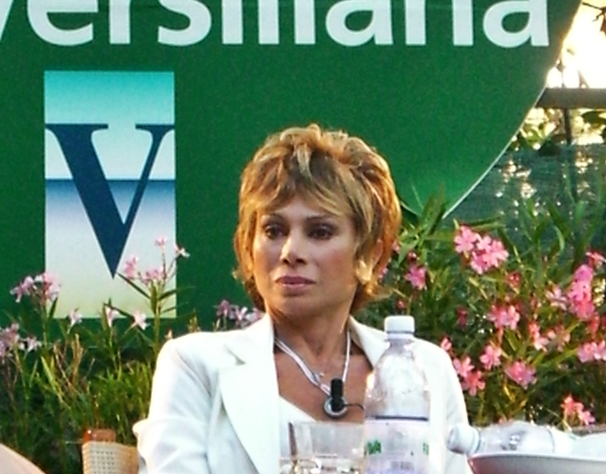
- Russo at the Versiliana Festival in 2008.
- Born: Carmela Carolina Fernanda Russo; 3 October 1959 (age 67); Genoa, Italy
- Occupations: Dancer; actress; television personality
- Years active: 1975–present
- Spouse: Enzo Paolo Turchi (m. 1987)
- Children: 1

Carmela Carolina Fernanda "Carmen" Russo (born 3 October 1959) is an Italian dancer, actress and television personality.

Russo started her career as a model in the mid-1970s participating in several beauty contests in Italy. She first came to the public's attention for her roles in the commedia erotica all'italiana (sex comedy) genre, such as Mia moglie torna a scuola, Giovani, belle... probabilmente ricche, and Paulo Roberto Cotechiño centravanti di sfondamento.

She subsequently established herself as a television star in the 1980s with the variety shows Drive In, Risatissima, and Grand Hotel. In 2003 and 2006, she also participated in the Italian and Spanish versions of the reality show Celebrity Survivor. She won in the Spanish version Supervivientes. In 2017, she also competed in Grande Fratello VIP 2, the Italian version of Celebrity Big Brother. During her career, she released also three unsuccessful studio albums, Stars on Donna, Le canzoni di "Drive in...", and Una notte italiana, and she was also chosen many times as a model for Playmen magazine during the 1980s.

== Early life ==
Russo was born in Genoa, on 3 October 1959. Her father, Giovanni Russo, was a Sicilian policeman, and her mother, Emilian Giuseppina Gherardini, worked as a cashier at the cinema "Olimpia". Her parents moved to Pavullo nel Frignano, a town in the province of Modena, Emilia-Romagna, and in 1969 her family returned to Genoa, where she joined a dance academy. In 1973, she finished middle school and her parents enrolled her at the Istituto Tecnico per il Turismo in Genoa, so that she would not give dance her full attention. She studied dance under Wanda Nardi, the most important dance school of the time in Genoa. She also began working as a model, appearing on a poster for the department store Coin.

== Career ==
=== 1974–1975: Beauty contests and night shows ===
In 1974, at the age of 13, Russo won her first important beauty contest, "Miss Liguria". The previous year, Russo also won the title of "Miss Emilia" held in Pavullo nel Frignano, but it was a qualification that had no value for the national contest. As the winner of "Miss Liguria", Russo qualified for the "Miss Italia" competition, but she was disqualified because she was too young.

=== 1975–1979: Rome, film appearances, and TV ===
In 1975, Russo and Mention moved to Rome, home of the major Italian film studios. The couple arrived in Rome and moved into an apartment close to Cinecittà. Every morning, Russo reportedly stood in long queues to submit auditions for a part in a movie. She was hired for a small part in the comedy movie Di che segno sei? with Adriano Celentano and Alberto Sordi.

In 1977, Russo was hired by Federico Fellini for a minor role in the film City of Women starring Marcello Mastroianni. In the movie, she shows her breasts, but was not credited. She then appeared in the crime movie Genova a mano armata as the cashier at the bar, and also made an appearance in Die linkshändige Frau (The Left-Handed Woman). The movie was a hit, especially in Germany, and was entered into the 1978 Cannes Film Festival.

During this time, she continued to work as a showgirl in nightclubs, and in 1978, she hosted, with Ettore Andenna, the TV show La bustarella, which aired on Antenna 3 Lombardia. In the same year, she appeared in Portobello with Enzo Tortora aired in Rai 2. Later, Russo appeared in many other films and debuted in the theatre supporting Walter Chiari in Hai mai provato con l'acqua calda?. With this play, Russo won the Premio de Curtis. Due to the expansion of her career, she decided to settle permanently in Rome, which was also the home of the agency "Gymnasium".

=== 1980–1983: Major roles, Playmen, and music ===
During the summer of 1979, Russo appeared for the first time in the Italian magazine for men Playmen, at the age of nineteen. After she appeared again in the magazine in late 1980, in 1981 and two times in 1982 and 1984. She became one of the highest-paid nude models in Italy.

In 1980, Russo participated in the making of two films: Patrick vive ancora with Gianni Dei and Girls Will Be Girls. During the filming of Girls Will Be Girls, she met Gianfranco D'Angelo, who helped Russo to enter the world of television. In this year, Russo also shot Le porno killers, her first role as a protagonist. In the film, Russo played a bisexual killer. In the movie, she was credited as Carmen Bizet. Her artistic breakthrough came in 1981. She left Mention and ended her job as a showgirl in nightclubs. Russo's next films were starring roles in the sex comedies La maestra di sci and Mia moglie torna a scuola.

At the end of 1981, Russo signed with Fontana Records for the release of a single. Her first single, "Notte senza luna", was promoted on Italian radio. In December 1981, Russo performed the B-side of the song "Stiamo insieme stasera" during the Italian TV show Blitz aired on Raiuno. The performance was shot on the Italian destroyer Ardito (D 550). Russo also performed "Stuntman", an unreleased song.

Russo saw significant career success in 1982 and 1983. During this time, she starred in four films. Russo began with Quella peste di Pierina with Marina Marfoglia and Oreste Lionello, a few months after turning Buona come il pane. She was subsequently chosen by Pierfrancesco Pingitore for the movie Il tifoso, l'arbitro e il calciatore with Pippo Franco, Alvaro Vitali, Marisa Merlini, and Daniela Poggi and then for Giovani, belle... probabilmente ricche with Gianfranco D'Angelo, Nadia Cassini, and Edwige Fenech. In early 1983, Russo also released her first full-length studio album Stars on Donna, released as Carmen. The album contains cover versions of songs by Donna Summer and Giorgio Moroder.

=== 1983–1986: Mediaset success and latest films ===
Cover of Russo "Sì" single

Brando Giordani and Emilio Ravel, journalists and authors, called Russo to participate in the program Colosseum, aired on Rai due. Later in 1983, Russo participated in the TV show Drive In, in which she played a sexy cashier. Russo was a primadonna in the show, where she sang, danced, and recited.

The theme of the show was originally sung by Cristina Moffa ("Zucchero, Zucchero"), later changed to the cover of Patty Pravo's 1968 hit "La Bambola", sung by Russo. The closing credits music, "Chiammame Ambresso", written by Cristiano Malgioglio, was also sung by Russo. During the show, Russo promoted her albums Stars on Donna and Le canzoni di "Drive In...". Le canzoni di "Drive In"...' contains selected tracks of songs performed by Russo in the show. From the album was also released one single, "Mi scusi signorina". In 1984, Russo also took part in the commercial for the candy "Morositas".

In the same year at the height of popularity, she took part in Ti spacco il muso, bimba with Oreste Lionello and Sergio Vasta, Paulo Roberto Cotechiño centravanti di sfondamento with Franca Valeri, and finally Cuando calienta el sol... vamos alla playa, a '60s musical-comedy film set with Claudia Vegliante and Edoardo Vianello.

In 1985, Russo returned to television, appearing in Risatissima and then in Grand Hotel on Canale 5. She also recorded the theme "Sì", an Italo disco song that had moderate success. In 1986, Russo hosted Un fantastico tragico venerdì with Lino Banfi and Massimo Boldi, which devoted Carmen as a star of classical ballet. Also for this show, she recorded the theme "Camomillati Venerdì".

=== 1987–1993: Marriage, return to Rai and Spanish TV ===
After a television-show pause in 1988, she performed her last film to date, Rimini, Rimini – Un anno dopo with Andrea Ronco and Eva Grimaldi. With this film, Russo turned 26 films, including six as the main role.

Russo participated in the TV musical Io Jane, tu Tarzan directed by Enzo Trapani. The show did not achieve success despite the ballets always being elaborate. Due to the failure of her last program in 1990, Russo did only some appearances as a guest on several TV shows: Buonasera con Tino Scotti, Blitz, Black- out, Mixer, Stasera niente di nuovo, Playboy di mezzanotte, Pop Corn, A botta calda, and Domenica, on which she was a permanent guest in the 1990–1991 season.

Later in 1991, Russo went to Spain to host VIP Noche on Tele 5 with Emilio Aragón for 60 episodes. The show was a surprise success, averaging a 41% share. Russo also worked on two editions of the Sunday program Batalla de las estrellas, which she co-hosted with José Luis Moreno on TVE for two years, as it aired at prime time on Saturdays.

=== Private life ===
On 26 June 1987, Russo married choreographer and dancer Enzo Paolo Turchi in a small church in Cassano delle Murge. They have a daughter, Maria. Carmen Russo considers herself Roman Catholic.

== Filmography ==
=== Film ===
Year	Title	Role(s)	Notes
1975	What's Your Sign?	Harassed Girl	Uncredited
1975	Mark Shoots First	Yacht Girl	Uncredited
1976	Merciless Man	Public Bath Owner	Cameo
1977	Nerone	Lucilla	
1977	Ecco noi per esempio	Club Dancer	Uncredited
1979	Liquirizia	Fulvio's Girl	Cameo
1979	Satan's Wife	The Dancer	
1979	The Nurse in the Military Madhouse	Model	Cameo
1979	I viaggiatori della sera	Girl at Radio Station	Uncredited
1979	Riavanti... Marsch!	Peppina	
1980	City of Women	Girl	Uncredited
1980	Le porno killers	Virginia	
1980	Patrick Still Lives	Sheryl Cough	
1980	Contes pervers	Luciana	
1980	Girls Will Be Girls	Orchidea	
1981	Ski Mistress	Celia Berni / Lucille Brown	
1981	Mia moglie torna a scuola	Valentina Buratti	
1981	Buona come il pane	Lisette	
1982	Odd Squad	The Prostitute	
1982	Quella peste di Pierina	Rosy Marcotulli	
1982	Giovani, belle... probabilmente ricche	Claudia De Santis	
1982	Il tifoso, l'arbitro e il calciatore	Manuela Presutti	
1982	Ti spacco il muso bimba	Duarda	
1983	Paulo Roberto Cotechiño centravanti di sfondamento	Lucelia	
1983	Cuando calienta el sol... vamos alla playa	Samantha	
2011	Centopercento Carmen – I balletti e gli sketch indimenticabili	Herself	Direct-to-video
2014	Un fidanzato modello	Carmen	Short film
2019	Sono solo fantasmi	Herself	Cameo
2026	La sobrietà †	TBA	Completed

=== Television ===
Year	Title	Role(s)	Notes
1978	Ma che sera	Herself / Dancer	Variety show
1978	La bustarella	Herself / Dancer	Game show
1978	Portobello	Herself / Dancer	Variety show
1978	Sam & Sally	Girl at Restaurant	Episode: "Lilli"
1980	Ma ce l'avete un cuore	Herself / Dancer	Variety show
1981	Signorine grandi firme	Herself / Co-host	Variety show
1981	Stasera niente di nuovo	Various	8 episodes
1983–1984	Drive In	Sexy Cashier / Various	Season 1
1985	Risatissima	Herself / Co-host	Variety show (season 2)
1985	Grand Hotel	Various	Season 1
1986–1987	Un fantastico tragico venerdì	Herself / Co-host	Variety show
1989	Io Jane, tu Tarzan	Jane	4 episodes
1990	Il vigile urbano	Herself	Episode: "Sarò famoso"
1990–1991	Domenica in	Herself / Opinionist	Talk show
1992–1993	Il canzoniere delle feste	Herself / Dancer	Variety show
1993	Stelle sull'acqua	Herself / Host	Variety show
1994–1995	Notte italiana	Herself / Co-host	Variety show
1996	Hostal Royal Manzanares	Giovanna	Episode: "¿Quién con niños se acuesta...?"
2003	L'isola dei famosi	Herself / Contestant	Reality show (season 1)
2006	Supervivientes: Perdidos en el Caribe	Herself / Contestant	Winner
2006–2008	Buona Domenica	Herself / Opinionist	Variety show (season 19-20)
2012	L'isola dei famosi	Herself / Contestant	Reality show (season 9)
2014	Chiringuito de Pepe	Francesca	3 episodes
2017, 2021	Grande Fratello VIP	Herself / Contestant	Reality show (season 2 and season 7)
2020	Tale e quale show	Herself / Contestant	Talent show (season 10)
2022	Alessandro Borghese: Celebrity Chef	Herself / Contestant	Season 2, episode 16
2024	Grande Fratello	Herself / Recurring guest	Reality show (season 18)
2025	Ne vedremo delle belle	Herself / Contestant	Talent show

== Discography ==
=== Albums ===
- 1983: Stars on Donna part one / Stars on Donna part two (Monkey Music Records Mr 31032)
- 1983: Stars on Donna (Monkey Music Records Mr 31721)
- 1984: Le canzoni di "Drive in..." (F1 Team 33318)
- 1992: Una notte italiana (Canaveral QR 1000)
- 1996: Macho Mambo EP/Mini album (Canaveral)

=== Singles ===
- 1981: "Notte senza luna"
- 1984: "Mi scusi, signorina"
- 1985: "Sì"
- 1985: "Mai, Mai, Mai"
- 1986: "Camomillati Venerdì"
- 1987: "Bravi, Settepiù"
- 1989: "Io Jane tu Tarzan"
- 1993: "Ciù Ciù Dance" EP (Real Sound RS5410)

== Sources ==
- Federazione italiana cineforum (1989). "none". Cineforum (in Italian). Vol. 29, no. 281–290.
- Bazan Giordano, Michele (2000). La commedia erotica italiana: vent'anni di cinema sexy "made in Italy" (in Italian). Contributions by Daniele Aramu and introduction by Barbara Bouchet. Rome: Gremese. ISBN 88-8440-035-X.
- Lancia, Enrico; Poppi, Roberto, eds. (2003). Le attrici: dal 1930 ai giorni nostri. Dizionario del cinema italiano (in Italian). Rome: Gremese Editore. ISBN 88-7605-596-7.
- Metz, Fioretta; Mondi, Edmondo (1994). La più bella sei tu: modi e mode degli italiani attraverso 50 anni del concorso di Miss Italia (in Italian). Rome: Edizioni dell'Ulisse. ICCU IT\ICCU\RAV\0244589.
- Red, Sylver; Blake, Paul (1983). Carmen Russo: L'atomica del sesso (in Italian). Milan: Forte Editore. ICCU IT\ICCU\LIG\0120692.
