= Sophia Lombardo =

Italian actress (born 1955)

- Born: September 14, 1955 (age 70); Rome, Lazio, Italy
- Occupation: Actress
- Years active: 1975 - 1987

Sophia Lombardo (born September 14, 1955) is an Italian actress.

== Biography ==
Lombardo began her career at a young age. She appeared in Italian style sex comedies, Spaghetti Westerns, as well as comedy films such as Sogni mostruosamente proibiti. She is perhaps best known for the role of the teacher Mazzacurati in two films of the saga of Pierino, Pierino contro tutti (1981) and Pierino colpisce ancora (1982). She retired from acting in 1987.

== Filmography ==
- Due sul pianerottolo (1975)
- Sex with a Smile II (Spogliamoci così, senza pudor) (1976)
- My Father's Private Secretary (1976)
- Classe mista (1976)
- The Virgo, the Taurus and the Capricorn (La vergine, il toro e il capricorno) (1977)
- Mannaja (1977)
- Sugar, Honey and Pepper (Zucchero, miele e peperoncino) (1980)
- Pierino contro tutti (1981)
- L'esercito più pazzo del mondo (1981)
- Crime at the Chinese Restaurant (Delitto al ristorante cinese) (1981)
- Manolesta (1981)
- Pierino colpisce ancora (1982)
- Sogni mostruosamente proibiti (1982)
- Zero in condotta (1983)
- A me mi piace (1985)
- Fotoromanzo (1986)
- Detective School Dropouts (Asilo di polizia) (1986)
- Animali metropolitani (1987)
