= Little Johnny =

Fictional character in jokes

Little Johnny jokes are about a fictional small boy named Little Johnny who naïvely poses questions and makes statements that are very embarrassing to adults, such as parents and teachers.

In 2011, an Australian animated comedy film was released entitled Little Johnny: The Movie with actress Genevieve Morris in the voiceover role of Little Johnny.

== Around the world ==
Joke characters similar to Little Johnny are known in many countries.

- Francophone world: Toto jokes and are encountered in film and books, to name a few:
  - Toto's Jokes, a French - Belgian - Luxembourgish film directed by Pascal Bourdiaux
  - Les Blagues de Toto, French animated television series broadcast since 2010
  - Les Blagues de Toto, French animated television series broadcast since 2020
  - Les Blagues de Toto, comic strip by Belgian author Thierry Coppée
- Germany: Klein Fritzchen (Little Fritzie)
- Greece: Τοτός (Totós). His girl counterpart is Annoula, or Little Anne.
- Italy: Pierino (diminutive of Peter): The character became famous in Italy between the 1970s and 1980s. Multiple films about Pierino were made, all starring Alvaro Vitali, including:
  - Desiderable Teacher (1981)
  - Desiderable Teacher 2 (1982)
  - Pierino la peste alla riscossa! (1982)
  - Desiderable Teacher 3 [it] (1990)
- Netherlands, Flanders: Jantje, a stereotype of the average little Dutch boy, a diminutive of Jan
- Spanish-speaking: Jaimito (diminutive of Jaime), Pepito: (diminutive of Pepe), and Benito. Jokes about these little travieso (mischievous) kids are part of the culture in Spanish-speaking countries, and they are a useful tool for language and culture acquisition. Many of these jokes have to do with school for with family. Many of them are of question-answer type, where the boy interprets the question is a way different from teacher's or parent's intention. Others are puns or plain silly.
  At school:
  "Pepito, please name five animals that give milk." – "Five cows, señorita."
  "Pepito, what do you think an ideal school should be?" – "Closed, maestra, closed."
  At home:
  "What will you be when you grow up, Pepito?" – mama asks. – "Much bigger."
- Sri Lanka: Amdan (Emden)
- Poland: In Poland, the naughty boy is Jasiu (mały Jasio, little Jan, also maly Jasiu). He is culturally close to Russian Vovochka, however in addition to traditional school and home environments, there is a layer of Jasiu jokes related to the Catholic Church.
  - After a mass, Jasiu approaches the priest:
  Your sermon was fucking good, padre!"
  You can't say that, my son! Repent!"
  But your sermon was real fucking good shit! I even decided to donate 1,000 złoty to the church."
  No shit???!"
- Russia: Vovochka (diminutive of Vova, which is itself a diminutive of Vladimir)
- Romania: Bulă, Alinuța
  - In 2006, TVR network conducted a vote to determine whom the general public considers the 100 Greatest Romanians of all time. Bulă was voted to be the 59th greatest Romanian.

== Female version ==
- Italy: Pierina [it] (female version of Pierino):
  - Quella peste di Pierina (1982), produced by Riccardo Billi

== See also ==
- Little Erna
- Little Willie
