= Fritzchen =

Fritzchen may refer to:

- An endearing diminutive of the name Friedrich->Fritz->Fritzchen
- Codename of Eddie Chapman
- Little Fritz, butt of German jokes, akin to Little Johnny
- Fritzchen (film), an upcoming American film directed by Joko Anwar
