= How to Seduce Your Teacher =

1979 film by Mariano Laurenti

- Italian theatrical release poster by Enzo Sciotti
- Italian: La liceale seduce i professori
- Directed by: Mariano Laurenti
- Screenplay by: Mariano Laurenti; Francesco Milizia
- Story by: Mariano Laurenti; Francesco Milizia
- Starring: Gloria Guida; Alvaro Vitali; Fabrizio Moroni; Lorraine De Selle; Donatella Damiani; Carlo Sposito; Ninetto Davoli; Lino Banfi
- Cinematography: Federico Zanni
- Edited by: Alberto Moriani
- Music by: Gianni Ferrio
- Production companies: Dania Film; Medusa Distribuzione
- Distributed by: Medusa Distribuzione
- Release date: 9 August 1979 (Italy)
- Running time: 93 minutes
- Country: Italy
- Language: Italian

How to Seduce Your Teacher (Italian: La liceale seduce i professori, lit. 'The High School Girl Seduces the Teachers') is a 1979 commedia sexy all'italiana directed by Mariano Laurenti. It is the third instalment in the "Liceale" film series and was followed by La liceale, il diavolo e l'acquasanta. Gloria Guida, who plays the main role, is also the performer of two songs of the soundtrack, "Come vuoi... con chi vuoi" and "Stammi vicino".

== Cast ==
- Gloria Guida as Angela Mancinelli
- Lino Banfi as Professor Pasquale La Recchiuta
- Carletto Sposito as Professor Caccioppo
- Alvaro Vitali as Salvatore Pinzarrone
- Ninetto Davoli as Arturo
- Lorraine De Selle as Fedora
- Donatella Damiani as Irma

== Related films ==
- La liceale (1975)
- La liceale nella classe dei ripetenti (1978)
- La liceale, il diavolo e l'acquasanta (1979), anthology film
- La liceale al mare con l'amica di papà (1980), without Gloria Guida
