= La liceale al mare con l'amica di papà =

1980 film by Marino Girolami

- Directed by: Marino Girolami
- Written by: Gino Capone
- Produced by: Camillo Teti
- Starring: Renzo Montagnani; Marisa Mell; Sabrina Siani
- Cinematography: Federico Zanni
- Music by: Ubaldo Continiello
- Release date: 10 December 1980
- Running time: 90 minutes
- Country: Italy
- Language: Italian

La liceale al mare con l'amica di papà (High School Girl at the Beach with Dad's Friend) is a 1980 commedia sexy all'italiana film directed by Marino Girolami and starring Renzo Montagnani. Although presented as the latest installment in the commercially successful Liceale series, the film, despite its title and the token blonde high school girl character, has little to no resemblance to earlier films starring Gloria Guida.

== Plot ==
Massimo Castaldi (Montagnani) is a social climber married to Violante (Marisa Mell), who comes from a rich family. His relationship with his mistress Laura (Cinzia De Ponti) is jeopardised when the family moves to its summer house on the Apulian coast of the Adriatic. Nevertheless, Massimo seems to find a solution. His raunchy daughter Sonia (Sabrina Siani) has failed in her Esame di Stato conclusivo del corso di studio di istruzione secondaria superiore exam, and he plans to present Laura as a nun who will give Sonia private lessons to re-take her exam. On the other hand, there are two dim-witted criminals, Terenzio (Alvaro Vitali) and Fulgenzio (Gianni Ciardo), who are planning to kidnap one of the Castaldi family for a large ransom.

== Cast ==
- Renzo Montagnani: Massimo Castaldi
- Marisa Mell: Violante Castaldi
- Alvaro Vitali: Terenzio
- Gianni Ciardo: Fulgenzio
- Cinzia De Ponti: Laura
- Sabrina Siani: Sonia Castaldi
- Andrea Brambilla: Arcibaldo
- Lucio Montanaro: Gustavo

== Reception ==
An Italian review of the time assesses the film as follows: "Predictable jokes, a few beautiful girls and a pair of low-rank avanspettacolo comedians."

== Related films ==
- La liceale (1975)
- La liceale nella classe dei ripetenti (1978)
- La liceale seduce i professori (1979)
- La liceale, il diavolo e l'acquasanta (1979), anthology film
