= A Policewoman on the Porno Squad =

1979 Italian sex comedy film directed by Michele Massimo Tarantini

La poliziotta della squadra del buon costume
- Directed by: Michele Massimo Tarantini
- Starring: Edwige Fenech
- Cinematography: Giancarlo Ferrando
- Edited by: Raimondo Crociani
- Music by: Gian Franco Reverberi
- Release date: 1979
- Country: Italy
- Language: Italian

La poliziotta della squadra del buon costume, internationally released as A Policewoman on the Porno Squad, is a 1979 commedia sexy all'italiana directed by Michele Massimo Tarantini. It is the sequel of Tarantini's La poliziotta fa carriera and it is followed by La poliziotta a New York.

== Cast ==
- Edwige Fenech: Gianna D'Amico
- Lino Banfi: Commissioner Scappavia
- Alvaro Vitali: Agent Tarallo
- Gianfranco Barra: Commissioner Nardecchia
- Marzio Honorato: Agent Arturo
- Franco Diogene: Joe Maccarone
- Giacomo Rizzo: Cocozza
- Sal Borgese: Pierre La Turraine
