= The New Godfathers =

- Directed by: Alfonso Brescia
- Screenplay by: Piero Regnoli; Ciro Ippolito
- Produced by: Ciro Ippolito
- Starring: Mario Merola; Antonio Sabàto; Gianni Garko; Jeff Blynn
- Cinematography: Silvio Fraschetti
- Production company: P.A.C.-Produzioni Atlas Consorziate
- Distributed by: P.A.C.
- Release date: 25 August 1979 (Italy)
- Country: Italy
- Box office: ₤342 million

The New Godfathers (Italian: I contrabbandieri di Santa Lucia, lit. 'The Smugglers of Santa Lucia') is a 1979 Italian poliziottesco film directed by Alfonso Brescia.

== Plot ==
A great quantity of drug travels undercovered from Iran and Turkey and arrives in port of Naples. An Italian Guardia di Finanza officer tries to intercept the stuff and achieves the collaboration of Don Francesco Autiero, the chief of illegal cigarettes trade in Naples.

== Cast ==
- Mario Merola: Don Francesco Autiero
- Antonio Sabàto: Don Michele Vizzini
- Gianni Garko: Captain Ivano Radevic
- Jeff Blynn: Salvatore Gargiulo
- Lorraine De Selle: Lorraine
- Edmund Purdom: Head of the International Commission on Narcotic Drugs
- Lucio Montanaro: Cassio Petrorio
- Rick Battaglia: Don Calogero Avallone
- Letizia D'Adderio: Stellatella
- Marco Girondino: Gennarino
- Nunzio Gallo: Dr. Martinelli
- Hassan Jaber: Vito
- Franco Diogene: Achmet
- Sabrina Siani: Lucy Avallone

== Production ==
The film was intended for the foreign market, unlike most other films in the subgenre.

Cior Ippolito's autobiography mentions that the film was made to help P.A.C.'s head Mario Bregni's recover costs that The Sicilian Connection which had lost a lot of money for the company.

Ippolito suggested the idea of using the action scenes from the film and apply them to a new film as not many people had seen the previous film. Ippolito stated that he had shot the new film in two weeks.

== Release ==
The New Godfathers was released in Italy on August 25, 1979 where it was distributed by P.A.C. The film grossed a total of 342 million Italian lire on its theatrical release.
