= Confessions of a Lady Cop =

1976 film directed by Michele Massimo Tarantini

La poliziotta fa carriera
- Directed by: Michele Massimo Tarantini
- Written by: Francesco Milizia; Marino Onorati; Michele Massimo Tarantini
- Starring: Edwige Fenech
- Cinematography: Giancarlo Ferrando
- Music by: Pulsar
- Release date: 1976
- Country: Italy
- Language: Italian

La poliziotta fa carriera, internationally released as Confessions of a Lady Cop, is a 1976 commedia sexy all'italiana directed by Michele Massimo Tarantini. It is an unofficial sequel of Steno's La poliziotta in which sex and nudity become more explicit, and at the same time it is a parody of the poliziottesco film genre. The film had two sequels, all starred by Edwige Fenech and directed by Tarantini, A Policewoman on the Porno Squad (La poliziotta della squadra del buon costume, 1979), and A Policewoman in New York (La poliziotta a New York, 1981).

== Cast ==
- Edwige Fenech: Gianna Amicucci
- Gigi Ballista: Questore Moretti
- Alvaro Vitali: Agente Tarallo
- Mario Carotenuto: Commissario Antinori
- Gianfranco D'Angelo: Onorevole Mannello
- Michele Gammino: Cecè
- Giuseppe Pambieri: Dr. Alberto Moretti
- Riccardo Garrone: Federico Innocenti
- Francesco Mulè: Alfredo Amicucci
- Gastone Pescucci: Tonino er mammola
- Nello Pazzafini: Mojefuma
- Gino Pagnani: Cecè's Friend
- Fortunato Arena: the man who falls into the fountain

== See also ==
- List of Italian films of 1976
