= Lorraine De Selle =

Italian actress

Lorraine de Selle
- Born: 13 August 1951 (age 74); Milan, Italy
- Occupations: Actress (former); Producer
- Years active: 1976–1988

Lorraine de Selle is an Italian-born former actress noted for her work in Italian genre cinema during the 1970s and 1980s.

Having worked with directors such as Joe D'Amato, Fernando di Leo, Ruggero Deodato and Umberto Lenzi, she remains best known for her roles in the horror films The House on the Edge of the Park and Cannibal Ferox, co-starring with Giovanni Lombardo Radice in both.

After retiring from acting, de Selle became a producer, responsible for the Italian TV series Carabinieri from 2002 to 2008.

== Selected filmography ==
- Emanuelle in America (1977) - Gemini
- Ladies' Doctor (1977) - Mara's lover
- Women's Camp 119 (1977) - Maria Black
- Damned in Venice (1978) - Christine's friend
- Where Are You Going on Holiday? (1978) - Girl at telephone
- Lovers and Liars (1979) - Jennifer
- Gardenia (1979) - Consuelo
- A Woman in the Night (1979) - Bianca Maria
- How to Seduce Your Teacher (1979) - Fedora
- The New Godfathers (1979) - Lorraine
- Madness (1980) - Paola
- The House on the Edge of the Park (1980) - Gloria
- Cannibal Ferox (1981) - Gloria Davis
- Violence in a Women's Prison (1982) - Head Warden
- Women's Prison Massacre (1983) - Colleen
- Wild Beasts (1984) - Laura Schwarz
