= Jantjes =

Jantjes is a surname. Notable people with the surname include:

- Conrad Jantjes (born 1980), South African rugby union footballer
- Gavin Jantjes (born 1948), South African painter, curator, writer, and lecturer

== See also ==
- Jantje, a given name
