= Serenate per 16 bionde =

1957 Italian musical comedy film

- Directed by: Marino Girolami
- Written by: Roberto Gianviti; Marino Girolami
- Produced by: Felice Felicioni
- Starring: Claudio Villa
- Cinematography: Giuseppe La Torre
- Music by: Ovidio Sarra
- Distributed by: Variety Distribution
- Release date: 1957
- Language: Italian

Serenate per 16 bionde (lit. Serenades for 16 Blondes) is a 1957 Italian musical comedy film written and directed by Marino Girolami and starring Claudio Villa.

== Cast ==
- Claudio Villa as Claudio
- Esther Masing as Isabella
- Simone Balmaine as Jeannette
- Wandisa Guida as Cristine
- Mario Riva as Peppe
- Riccardo Billi as Pippo
- Carlo Sposito as Raimondo
- Carlo Delle Piane as Mario
- Diana Rabito as Paulette
- Toni Ucci as Paolo
- Enzo Garinei as Ugo
- Pina Gallini as Corinne
- Loretta Capitoli as Odette
- Bibi Martellotti as Jacqueline
- Loris Gizzi as Camillo Triglia
- Giorgio Gandos as Buona Fortuna
- Silvio Bagolini
- Anna Campori
