= Franco Diogene =

Italian actor and comedian (1947–2005)

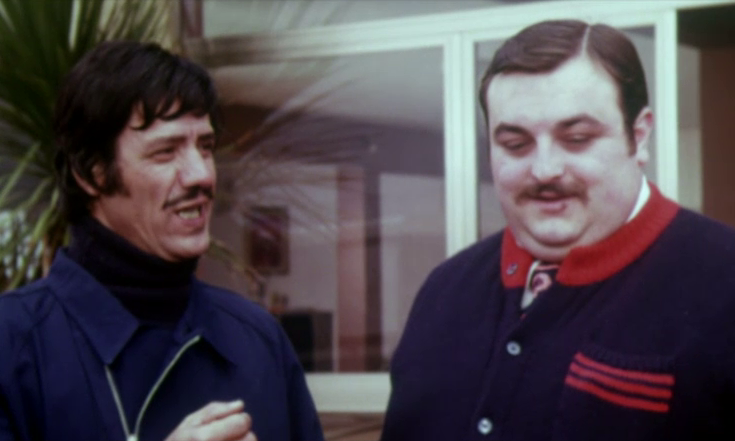
- Franco Franchi and Franco Diogene in Il giustiziere di mezzogiorno (1975)
- Born: Concetto Francesco Diogene; 20 October 1947; Catania, Italy
- Died: 27 May 2005 (aged 57); Genoa, Italy
- Occupation: Actor

Franco Diogene (20 October 1947 – 27 May 2005) was an Italian actor and comedian.

== Life and career ==
Born Concetto Francesco Diogene in Catania, he was the son of a Sicilian father and a Ligurian mother. At 5 years old, Diogene moved to Genoa with his family. In Genoa he completed his studies, and also started acting in a little theater of a parish. Since the early 1970s, he was one of the most active character actors in Italian cinema, often cast in humorous roles. He was also cast in several international productions, such as Midnight Express (in the role of Yesil, the Turkish lawyer who unsuccessfully defended Billy Hayes in court) and The Name of the Rose, mainly thanks to his foreign language skills. Diogene was also active as a stand-up comedian, and he was the organizer of the beauty contest "Miss Top Model Universe".

Diogene died of a heart attack, aged 57 years old.

== Selected filmography ==
- Due mafiosi contro Al Capone (1966) - Night club Announcer
- Maria Rosa la guardona (1973)
- Teresa the Thief (1973)
- Il colonnello Buttiglione diventa generale (1974)
- Kidnap (1974) - Nino
- Ante Up (1974) - Peppino il Barbiere
- Buttiglione diventa capo del servizio segreto (1975) - Tenente Parisi
- The Suspicious Death of a Minor (1975) - Pesce's Lawyer (uncredited)
- Nude per l'assassino (1975) - Maurizio
- Teasers (1975) - Monica's Lover
- La collegiale (1975) - Carlo De Marchi
- Il giustiziere di mezzogiorno (1975) - Vigile Corrotto
- Sex with a Smile (1976) - Ignazio, her husband (segment "I soldi in banca")
- La madama (1976) - Fruttivendolo
- As of Tomorrow (1976) - Garage Owner (uncredited)
- Roma, l'altra faccia della violenza (1976) - Lawyer
- Goodnight, Ladies and Gentlemen (1976) - Grocer (uncredited)
- Cuginetta, amore mio! (1976) - Sciaccaluga
- Tentacles (1977) - Chuck
- Taxi Girl (1977) - Sheik Abdul Lala
- Midnight Express (1978) - Yesil
- Gardenia (1979) - Friend of Gardenia
- A Policewoman on the Porno Squad (1979) - Joe Maccarone
- I contrabbandieri di Santa Lucia (1979) - Achmet
- Supersexymarket (1979)
- Saturday, Sunday and Friday (1979) - The lawyer (segment "Venerdì")
- Il viziaccio (1980)
- City of Women (1980) - Party Guest (uncredited)
- L'insegnante al mare con tutta la classe (1980) - Headmaster
- Delitto a Porta Romana (1980) - Busoni - the usurer
- Trhauma (1980) - Bitto
- Il terno a letto (1980)
- Madly in Love (1981) - Capo cameriere
- Il paramedico (1982) - 'Palletta'-The Car Wrecker
- La casa stregata (1982)
- Attenti a quei P2 (1982) - Emiro Kashieri
- Giovani, belle... probabilmente ricche (1982) - L'avvocato
- Grand Hotel Excelsior (1980) - Ing. Binotti
- Attila flagello di Dio (1982) - Mercante genovese
- Heads I Win, Tails You Lose (1982) - The soccer team's owner
- Stesso mare stessa spiaggia (1983) - Piero
- The World of Don Camillo (1984) - Binella
- Il ragazzo di campagna (1984) - 1st Recruitment Manager
- Madman at War (1985) - Nitti
- Killer contro killers (1985) - Hagen
- The Mines of Kilimanjaro (1986) - Tai-Ling
- The Name of the Rose (1986) - Päpstliche Gesandte #1
- 7 chili in 7 giorni (1986) - Assessore Turri
- Il burbero (1986) - Controllore vagoni letto
- Il lupo di mare (1987)
- Russicum - I giorni del diavolo (1988)
- The Big Blue (1988) - Receptionist
- Interzone (1989) - Rat
- There Was a Castle with Forty Dogs (1990) - Padre di Violetta
- The Bachelor (1990)
- Occhio alla perestrojka (1990) - Racist Receptionist
- Fuga da Kayenta (1991) - Sheriff Baker
- Acquitted for Having Committed the Deed (1992)
- Ci hai rotto papà (1993) - Colonnello Nardini
- Piccolo grande amore (1993)
- Caino e Caino (1993) - Direttore della Casa di Riposo
- The House of the Spirits (1993) - Man at the Party
- 18000 giorni fa (1993) - Dottor Bianchi
- Policemen (1995) - Bunny
- The Stendhal Syndrome (1996) - Victim's husband
- Esercizi di stile (1996)
- Con rabbia e con amore (1997) - Man with white Mercedes near the beach
- Il tocco - La sfida (1997) - Omaccio
- Figurine (1997) - Mister Atlas
- La classe non è acqua (1997) - Professore siciliano
- Boom (1999) - Coluso (Segment: Il figlio di Claudio Villa)
- Voci (2000) - Libraio
- Proibito baciare (2000)
- The Bankers of God: The Calvi Affair (2002) - Luigi Mennini
- Il compagno americano (2003) - Carboni
