= Seven Hours of Violence =

- Directed by: Michele Massimo Tarantini
- Starring: George Hilton; Rosemary Dexter
- Cinematography: Federico Zanni
- Music by: Alessandro Alessandroni
- Release date: 1973
- Country: Italy
- Language: Italian

Seven Hours of Violence (Italian: Sette ore di violenza per una soluzione imprevista) is a 1973 Italian crime-thriller film. It marked the directorial debut by Michele Massimo Tarantini.

== Cast ==
- George Hilton as George Anderson
- Rosemary Dexter as Helen Karlatis
- Giampiero Albertini as Inspector Athanasiadis
- Steffen Zacharias as Fastikopulos
- Ernesto Colli as Tomassian
- Claudio Nicastro as Kavafris
- Gianni Musy as Mchael Papadopoulos
- Greta Vayan as Greta Bapadopulos
- Iwao Yoshioka as Chinese thug
- George Wang as Chinese thug
