= Carlo Sposito =

Italian actor (1924–1984)

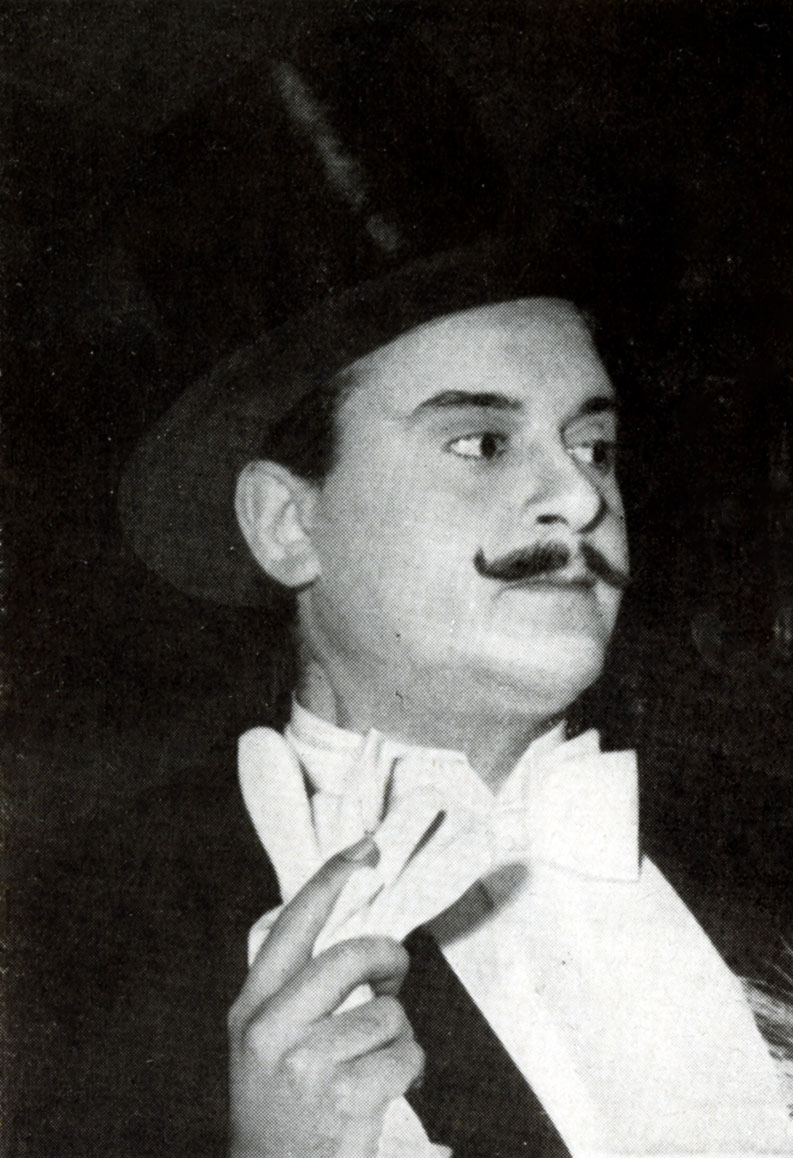
- Carlo Sposito in 1953
- Born: 1 May 1924; Palermo, Kingdom of Italy
- Died: 9 September 1984 (aged 60); Rome, Italy
- Other name: Carletto Sposito
- Occupation: Actor

Carlo Sposito (1 May 1924 – 9 September 1984) was an Italian character actor, sometimes credited as Carletto Sposito.

Born in Palermo, he was among the most active actors in the post-war Italian genre cinema. He was also pretty active on stage, radio and television.

He died at 60 of myocardial infarction, in Rome. He was the brother of the playwright Faele.

== Selected filmography ==
- For the Love of Mariastella (1946) - Rosalino
- Difficult Years (1948) - Riccardo
- Return to Naples (1949) - Vittorio
- Flying Squadron (1949) - Allievo
- Cintura di castità (1950)
- Women Without Names (1950) - Ciulian the Albanian Ice-cream Maker
- His Last Twelve Hours (1950) - Il duca Luca Sorino
- Il monello della strada (1950)
- The Crossroads (1951) - Il vice-commissario Sani
- The Ungrateful Heart (1951) - Anselmo
- The Young Caruso (1951) - Giovanni "Gianni" Palma
- Paris Is Always Paris (1951) - Toto Mancuso
- Una bruna indiavolata! (1951) - Giulio
- His Last Twelve Hours (1951) - Alfredo Bruca
- Falsehood (1952) - Il brigadiere Oriani
- Serenata amara (1952)
- Giovinezza (1952) - Venditore ambulante
- The Piano Tuner Has Arrived (1952)
- Cats and Dogs (1952) - Tonino
- Le marchand de Venise (1953)
- Noi peccatori (1953) - Francesco
- A Husband for Anna (1953) - Nicolino - l'aiuto del fotografo
- Ci troviamo in galleria (1953) - Poppo
- Processo contro ignoti (1954) - Operaio del garage
- Marriage (1954) - Epaminonda Maksimovich Aplombov, il sposo
- Theodora, Slave Empress (1954) - Scarpios
- Papà Pacifico (1954) - Itinerant vendor
- The Three Thieves (1954) - Michele
- Prima di sera (1954) - The Lawyer in Capena
- Milanese in Naples (1954) - Assistente del Prof. Simoni
- The Art of Getting Along (1955) - Il duca di Lanocita
- The Miller's Beautiful Wife (1955) - Pasqualino
- Il falco d'oro (1955) - Baccio
- Songs of Italy (1955)
- Donne, amore e matrimoni (1956) - Oreste
- Cantando sotto le stelle (1956) - Gelsomino
- Serenate per 16 bionde (1957) - Raimondo
- The Love Specialist (1957)
- Primo applauso (1957)
- Serenatella sciuè sciuè (1958) - don Liborio
- Marinai, donne e guai (1958)
- Le cameriere (1959)
- Le sorprese dell'amore (1959) - Gaspare Florio
- Ferdinando I° re di Napoli (1959) - (uncredited)
- La sceriffa (1960) - Gennarino - a.k.a. Gen
- Latin Lovers (1965) - L'amico di Fifì (segment "L'irreparabile")
- Con rispetto parlando (1965)
- I complessi (1965) - Massimo Tabusso (segment "Il Complesso della Schiava nubiana") (uncredited)
- Me, Me, Me... and the Others (1966) - Barman
- Ischia operazione amore (1966) - Maresciallo Francesco Capaci
- Don Juan in Sicily (1967) - Scannapieco
- Quando dico che ti amo (1967) - Guiducci - Male nurse
- I zanzaroni (1967) - (segment "Quelli qui partono")
- Un caso di coscienza (1970) - Benito Pozzi
- W le donne (1970) - Galluppi
- La prima notte del dottor Danieli, industriale, col complesso del... giocattolo (1970) - Totò
- Principe coronato cercasi per ricca ereditiera (1970) - Antonio 'Totò' Spampinato della Scaletta
- Le inibizioni del dottor Gaudenzi, vedovo col complesso della buonanima (1971) - Serpieri - the General Manager
- The Beasts (1971) - Avv. Apposito (segment "Il caso Apposito")
- When Women Were Called Virgins (1972) - Fra' Mariaccio
- Il fidanzamento (1975) - Totò
- My Sister in Law (1976) - Prosecutor
- The Schoolteacher Goes to Boys' High (1977) - Hauffmann
- The Schoolteacher Goes to Boys' High (1978) - Prof. Morlupo
- La liceale nella classe dei ripetenti (1978) - The Principal
- Cugine mie (1978) - Zio Federico
- The School Teacher in the House (1978) - Colonnello Marullo
- How to Seduce Your Teacher (1979) - Professor Cacioppo
- The Nurse in the Military Madhouse (1979) - Madman
- La ripetente fa l'occhietto al preside (1980) - Don Evaristo
