= Marino Girolami =

Italian film director (1914–1994)

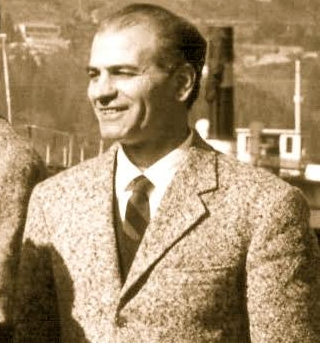
- Born: Marino Girolami; 1 February 1914; Rome, Italy
- Died: 20 February 1994 (aged 80); Rome, Italy
- Occupation: Film director
- Children: Ennio Girolami; Enzo G. Castellari

Marino Girolami (1 February 1914 – 20 February 1994) was an Italian film director and actor.

== Biography ==
Marino Girolami was born on 1 February 1914 in Rome, Italy. Formally a professional boxer, Girolami ended his boxing career when he was 20. Following this, he got a degree as a physical therapist and opened a gym which specialized in therapeutic massages. Girolami entered into Italy Centro Sperimentale di Cinematografia. Among the people Girolami met was Anna Magnani who took her son Luca to meet him which led to close relationship between them. Girolami gave her the script he had been working on of Campo de' fiori which was passed on to Aldo Fabrizi. The story was re-written by Girolami and Federico Fellini and directed by Mario Bonnard, which led to Girolami working in film. He debuted as an actor in 1940, and became an assistant director for Mario Soldati, Marcello Marchesi, Vittorio Metz. In 1949 he debuted as a director with La strada buia, a variation on the film Fugitive Lady. He pursued his career as film director with several musical comedies and melodramas.

Film historian and critic Roberto Curti described Girolami as one of Italy's most prolific genre directors, directing 78 films in three decades. Girolami worked in several genres and trends such as the Western with Between God, the Devil and a Winchester, the crime film (Violent Rome) and horror with Zombie Holocaust. Girolami also made hardcore pornography such as Sesso profondo. He died on 20 February 1994 in Rome.

== Personal life ==
Girolami was the older brother of director Romolo Girolami, who worked with Marino as an assistant director on some of his films, such as Il Mio amico Jekyll and later directed under the name Romolo Guerrieri. Marino Girolami is also the father of actor Ennio Girolami and director Enzo G. Castellari.

== Select filmography ==
Note: The films listed as N/A are not necessarily chronological.

Title	Year	Credited as				Notes	Ref(s)
Title	Year	Director	Screenwriter	Producer	Other	Notes	Ref(s)
Beatrice Cenci	—N/a				Yes	Actor	
L'ultimo combattimento	—N/a				Yes	Actor	
Villa da vendere	—N/a				Yes	Actor, as brigadiere di polizia	
Giarabub	—N/a				Yes	Actor	
Violette nei capelli	—N/a				Yes	Actor	
The Peddler and the Lady	1943				Yes	Screen story writer	
Miss Italia	—N/a				Yes	Film editor	
Fugitive Lady	—N/a	Yes					
Love and Blood	1951	Yes					
Era lui... sì! sì!	—N/a	Yes					
We Two Alone	—N/a	Yes					
Era lei che lo voleva	—N/a	Yes					
Lasciateci in pace	—N/a	Yes					
Riscatto	—N/a	Yes			Yes	Screen story writer	
Canto per te	—N/a	Yes					
Il cantante misterioso	—N/a	Yes					
Ore 10 lezione di canto	—N/a	Yes	Yes		Yes	Screen story writer	
La ragazza di via Veneto	—N/a	Yes			Yes	Screen story writer	
Cantando sotto le stelle	—N/a	Yes					
Buongiorno primo amore!	—N/a	Yes					
La canzone del destino	—N/a	Yes	Yes		Yes	Screen story writer	
C'è un sentiero nel cielo	—N/a	Yes	Yes		Yes	Screen story writer	
Serenate per 16 bionde	—N/a	Yes	Yes		Yes	Screen story writer	
7 canzoni per 7 sorelle	—N/a	Yes	Yes		Yes	Screen story writer	
Vivendo, cantando... che male ti fo?	—N/a	Yes	Yes		Yes	Screen story writer	
Quando gli angeli piangono	—N/a	Yes	Yes		Yes	Screen story writer	
Il romanzo di un giovane povero	—N/a	Yes	Yes				
Un canto nel deserto	—N/a	Yes					
Quanto sei bella Roma	—N/a	Yes	Yes				
Quel tesoro di papà	—N/a	Yes					
Caccia al marito	—N/a	Yes	Yes		Yes	Screen story writer	
Ferragosto in bikini	—N/a	Yes	Yes		Yes	Screen story writer	
My Friend, Dr. Jekyll	1960	Yes	Yes	Yes	Yes	Screen story writer	
Bellezze sulla spiaggia	—N/a	Yes					
Un figlio d'oggi	—N/a	Yes	Yes		Yes	Screen story writer	
Le magnifiche 7	—N/a	Yes					
La ragazza sotto il lenzuolo	—N/a	Yes	Yes		Yes	Screen story writer	
Scandali al mare	—N/a	Yes					
Walter e i suoi cugini	—N/a	Yes	Yes		Yes	Screen story writer	
L'assassino si chiama Pompeo	—N/a	Yes					
The Fury of Achilles	—N/a	Yes					
l medico delle donne	—N/a	Yes					
Twist, lolite e vitelloni	—N/a	Yes	Yes		Yes	Screen story writer	
La donna degli altri è sempre più bella	—N/a	Yes			Yes	Screen story writer	
Le motorizzate	—N/a	Yes					
Siamo tutti pomicioni	—N/a	Yes					
I magnifici Brutos del West	—N/a	Yes	Yes		Yes	Screen story writer	
Bullet in the Flesh	1964	Yes					
Queste pazze, pazze donne	—N/a	Yes					
Le tardone	—N/a	Yes					
Veneri al sole	—N/a	Yes	Yes		Yes	Screen story writer	
Veneri in collegio	—N/a	Yes	Yes		Yes	Screen story writer	
I 7 monaci d'oro	—N/a	Yes	Yes		Yes	Screen story writer	
Spiaggia libera	—N/a	Yes	Yes		Yes	Screen story writer	
Due Rrringos nel Texas	—N/a	Yes			Yes	Screen story writer	
Granada, addio!	—N/a	Yes					
Il lungo, il corto, il gatto	1967		Yes		Yes	Screen story writer	
Renegade Riders	1967				Yes	Screen story writer	
One by One	1968		Yes				
Between God, the Devil and a Winchester	1968	Yes	Yes				
Franco, Ciccio e le vedove allegre	—N/a	Yes			Yes	Screen story writer	
I due magnifici fresconi	—N/a	Yes	Yes		Yes	Screen story writer, film editor	
Raptus	—N/a	Yes	Yes		Yes	Screen story writer	
Don Franco e Don Ciccio nell'anno della contestazione	—N/a	Yes	Yes		Yes	Screen story writer	
African Story	—N/a	Yes	Yes		Yes	Screen story writer	
Los amantes del diablo	—N/a		Yes				
Decameron proibitissimo	—N/a	Yes					
Maria Rosa la guardona	—N/a	Yes			Yes	Screen story writer	
4 marmittoni alle grandi manovre	—N/a	Yes					
Rudeness	1975	Yes					
Lover Boy	—N/a	Yes	Yes		Yes	Screen story writer	
La moglie vergine	—N/a	Yes	Yes		Yes	Screen story writer	
Violent Rome	1975	Yes					
Amici più di prima	—N/a	Yes					
Roma, l'altra faccia della violenza	1976	Yes					
Special Cop in Action	1976	Yes					
Kakkientruppen	1977	Yes	Yes		Yes	Screen story writer	
Nudeodeon	—N/a	Yes	Yes		Yes	Screen story writer	
Where Can You Go Without the Little Vice?	—N/a	Yes					
Hunted City	1979				Yes	Screen story writer	
Sesso profondo	—N/a	Yes					
Zombie Holocaust	1980	Yes					
La liceale al mare con l'amica di papà	—N/a	Yes					
L'esercito più pazzo del mondo	—N/a	Yes					
Pierino contro tutti	—N/a	Yes		Yes			
Giggi il bullo	—N/a	Yes		Yes			
Pierino colpisce ancora	—N/a	Yes		Yes			
