= Marina Hedman =

Swedish-Italian pornographic actress

- Born: 29 September 1944 (age 81); Gothenburg, Sweden
- Occupation: Actress

Marina Hedman Bellis, also known as Marina Frajese, Marina Lotar and Marina Lothar (born 11 June 1944) is a Swedish retired pornographic actress. Her maiden name is Bellis Marina Hedman.

== Life and career ==
Hedman, who had been a well-known model, arrived in Italy as wife of an Italian journalist, Paolo Frajese, who in 1965 had gone to Sweden for a number of television reports. In 1976 she made her film debut with a small uncredited role in Lucio Fulci's sex comedy La pretora (My Sister In Law), starring Edwige Fenech. Later in 1976, she played a minor role in Emanuelle in America, appearing in her first hardcore scene. Then Hedman also appeared in the RAI show Carosello and posed for the Italian issue of Playboy Magazine. In 1979 she played a major role in Joe D'Amato's Immagini di un convento ("Images in a Convent"), an adaptation of La Religieuse.

Throughout the late 1970s and early 1980s, Hedman had supporting roles in mainstream films such as Primo Amore (First love) (1978) for Dino Risi and La città delle donne (City of Women) (1980) for Federico Fellini, as well as leading roles in pornographic cinema, in which she was considered one of the first Italian divas. 1984 and 1985 were prolific years for her, playing in films named after her, such as Marina e la sua bestia (Marina and her beast). She was also cast opposite John Holmes in the film The Devil in Mr. Holmes (1987). She appeared in her last film in the early 90s.

== Filmography ==
=== Mainstream roles ===
- La pretora (a.k.a. My Sister In Law, 1976)
- Il ginecologo della mutua (a.k.a. Ladies' Doctor, 1977)
- Un brivido di piacere (1978)
- Follie di notte (a.k.a. Crazy Nights, 1978)
- Le notti porno nel mondo n. 2 (a.k.a. Scandinavian Erotica, 1978)
- Primo amore (a.k.a. First Love, 1978)
- Come perdere una moglie...e trovare un'amante (a.k.a. How to Lose a Wife and Find a Lover, 1978)
- La bestia nello spazio (a.k.a. The Beast in Space, 1978)
- Le mani di una donna sola (1979)
- Gegè Bellavita (1979)
- Il mondo porno di due sorelle (a.k.a. Emanuelle and Joanna, 1979)
- Libidine (1979)
- Play Motel (1979)
- Quello strano desiderio (1979)
- La città delle donne (a.k.a. City of Women, 1980)
- Febbre a 40! (a.k.a. Happy Birthday, Harry, 1980)
- Una moglie, due amici, quattro amanti (a.k.a. Do It With the Pamango, 1980)
- Delitto a Porta Romana (a.k.a. Crime at Porta Romana, 1980)
- La compagna di viaggio (1980)
- Delitto sull'autostrada (1982)
- Satan's Baby Doll (1982)
- Fantozzi subisce ancora (1983)
- Delitto al Blue Gay (a.k.a. Cop in Drag, 1984)
- Appuntamento in nero (a.k.a. Scandal in Black, 1990)

=== Sexploitation and pornographic roles ===
Several of these films exist in both softcore and hardcore versions.

- Emanuelle in America (1976)
- Cameriera senza... malizia (1979)
- La Zia Svedese (1980)
- Albergo a ore (1981)
- Carnalitá morbosa (1981)
- Erotic Flash (1981)
- Lea (1981)
- Sesso allegro (1981)
- Attenti a quelle due... ninfomani (1981)
- Chiamate: 6969 taxi per signora (1981)
- L'Aristocratica perversa (1982)
- Giselas Liebesabenteuer in Rom (1982)
- Orgasmo esotico (1982)
- Orgasmo Non-Stop (1982)
- Sueca bisexual necesita semental (a.k.a. I Vizi della signora, 1992)
- L'Amica di Sonia (1983)
- La Casa delle hostess (1983)
- Deborah la bambola bionda (1984)
- L'Amante bisex (1984)
- Fashion Love (1984)
- Jojami (1984)
- Wendee (1984)
- Pin Pon (1984)
- Apprendiste viziose (1985)
- La Bionda e la bestia (1985)
- Marina vedova viziosa (1985)
- Una Novizia nel porno-harem (1985)
- Colossale débauche pour une femme frigide (1985)
- Adolescentes pour satyres (1986)
- Bas noirs et cuirs vernis (1986)
- L'Amore e la bestia (1986)
- La Sfida erotica (1986)
- Miele Selvaggio (1986)
- Poker di donne (1987)
- Slip caldo e bagnato (1987)
- Un bestiale triangolo erotico (1987)
- Bocca bianca, bocca nera (1987)
- Il Vizio nel ventre (1987)
- Osceno (1987)
- Baby lady, la provocazione carnale (1987)
- Un Bestiale... triangolo erotico (1987)
- Donna, un brivido di piacere (1987)
- Le Belve del sesso (1987)
- Un Desiderio bestiale (1987)
- The Devil in Mr. Holmes (1987)
- La Bottega del piacere (1988)
- Calda pioggia di sesso (1989)
- Avidità orale (1990)
- Baby nata per godere ovvero la figlia libidinosa (1991)
- Finalmente Marina (1991)
