= Pierino contro tutti =

- Italian theatrical release poster
- Directed by: Marino Girolami
- Written by: Gianfranco Clerici; Vincenzo Mannino
- Produced by: Filmes International
- Starring: Alvaro Vitali; Michela Miti; Sophia Lombardo; Michele Gammino
- Cinematography: Federico Zanni
- Edited by: Alberto Moriani
- Music by: Berto Pisano
- Distributed by: Medusa Film
- Release date: 1981
- Running time: 88 min
- Country: Italy
- Language: Italian

Pierino contro tutti (also known as Desirable Teacher) is a 1981 comedy film directed by Marino Girolami. The main character of the film is Pierino, an Italian variation of Little Johnny. The film was a massive success at the Italian box office, and generated a brief series of sequels (in the main part non-official sequels) including a female version of Pierino, as well as a short lived subgenre of joke-films in which the plot basically consists of a series of jokes placed side by side.

== Plot ==
Rome: Peter (Pierino) is a precocious but mischievous boy who often plays pranks and makes jokes at school. His enemy is his old teacher. One day Pierino pulls a dirty trick on her, making her break an arm. The substitute class teacher is a pretty girl Pierino falls in love with. However, a professor also falls in love with the beautiful teacher, and so Pierino must devise numerous jokes to save the teacher.

== Cast ==
- Alvaro Vitali as Pierino
- Michela Miti as Substitute
- Sophia Lombardo as Teacher Mazzacurati
- Michele Gammino as Teacher Celani
- Enzo Liberti as Pierino's Father
- Riccardo Billi as Pierino's Grandfather
- Deddi Savagnone as Pierino's Mother
- Cristina Moffa as Sabrina
- Marisa Merlini as Fortune Teller
- Enzo Garinei as Hardware Store Customer
