= My Friend, Dr. Jekyll =

- Directed by: Marino Girolami
- Written by: Giulio Scarnicci; Renzo Tarabusi; Carlo Veo; Marino Girolami
- Story by: Giulio Scarnicci; Renzo Tarabusi; Carlo Veo; Marino Girolami
- Produced by: Marino Girolami
- Cinematography: Luciano Trasatti
- Edited by: Franco Fraticelli
- Music by: Alexandre Derevitsky
- Distributed by: Incei Film (Italy)
- Release date: 11 August 1960 (Italy)
- Running time: 90 minutes
- Country: Italy
- Box office: ₤157 million

My Friend, Dr. Jekyll (Italian: Il mio amico Jekyll), is a 1960 Italian comedy film directed by Marino Girolami. It is a parody of the Robert Louis Stevenson's 1886 novella Strange Case of Dr Jekyll and Mr Hyde.

The film deals with the concept of a mind swap. A professor uses a mind swap technique to transfer his own mind to the body of a tutor. A later attempt to return the body to its original owner results in the professor's mind inhabiting the body of a monkey.

== Plot summary ==
In 20th century Italy, Giacinto Floria is a tutor in a rehabilitation center for former prostitutes. Floria is kidnapped each night by Professor Fabius who transfers his mind into Floria's, making him a crazed sex fiend. A detective later discovers this is happening and frees Floria from his kidnapper while the Professor's mind ends up within the body of a monkey at a zoo.

== Cast ==
- Ugo Tognazzi as Giacinto Floria
- Raimondo Vianello as Prof. Fabius
- Abbe Lane as Mafalda de Matteis
- Hélène Chanel as Rossana
- Carlo Croccolo as Arguzio
- Linda Sini as Adelaide
- Luigi Pavese as Colonel Rolando
- Anna Campori as Clarissa de Matteis
- Elena Fontana as Loredana
- Maria Fiè as Mara
- Angela Portaluri as Fanny
- Dori Dorika as Yvonne Trelati Norcia
- Ivanna Gilli as Margot

== Release ==
My Friend, Dr. Jekyll was released in Italy on August 11, 1960 where it was distributed by Incei Film. It grossed a total of 157 million Italian Lira on its initial theatrical run.

The film received a release in the United States in March 1965 through Union Film Distributors. The film was acquired by Dick Randall through the purchase of Sam Fleishmann's shares in the company. It has not been released on home video as of 2015.
