= Ski Mistress =

1981 film by Alessandro Lucidi

- Directed by: Alessandro Lucidi
- Written by: Piero Regnoli
- Starring: Carmen Russo; Andy Luotto
- Cinematography: Gastone Di Giovanni
- Music by: Stelvio Cipriani
- Release date: 1981
- Language: Italian

Ski Mistress (Italian: La maestra di sci) is a 1981 Italian sex comedy film directed by Alessandro Lucidi and starring Carmen Russo.

== Cast ==
- Carmen Russo as Celia Berni
- Andy Luotto as Franco
- Cinzia De Ponti as Carla
- Daniele Vargas as Emir Hussein
- Sonia Otero as Stella
- Renzo Ozzano as Walter A. Thompson
- Ghigo Masino as Hotel Manager
- Giacomo Rizzo as Kidnapper

== See also ==
- List of Italian films of 1981
