= Ladies' Doctor =

1977 film

- Directed by: Joe D'Amato
- Screenplay by: Tito Carpi
- Produced by: Fabrizio De Angelis
- Starring: Renzo Montagnani; Paola Senatore; Mario Carotenuto; Aldo Fabrizi
- Cinematography: Fausto Zuccoli
- Edited by: Vincenzo Tomassi
- Music by: Renato Serio
- Release date: 1977
- Language: Italian

Ladies' Doctor (Italian: Il ginecologo della mutua) is a 1977 commedia sexy all'italiana film directed by Joe D'Amato.

== Cast ==
- Renzo Montagnani as Dr. Franco Giovanardi
- Paola Senatore as Pamela
- Mario Carotenuto as Lawyer Augusto Natisone
- Aldo Fabrizi as Dr. Pietro Massone
- Massimo Serato as Dr. Guido Lo Bianco
- Daniela Doria as Tina Arlotti
- Loretta Persichetti as Mara
- Isabella Biagini as Giovanna
- Toni Ucci as Nestore Arlotti
- Riccardo Salvino as Filippo
- Lorraine De Selle as Mara's Lover
- Marina Hedman as Miss Natisone
- Anna Bonaiuto as Rosalia Saggarrò
- Stefania Spugnini as Pregnant girl
- Dirce Funari as Mimma
- Luciano Bonanni as Arlotti's Bodyguard

== Production ==
The film was produced by Kristal Film. Initially, the film was announced with Edmondo Amati serving as producer and with a different cast, which in addition of Renzo Montagnani and Paola Senatore included Gloria Guida, Jacques Dufilho, Silvia Dionisio and Simonetta Stefanelli. Alberto Lupo was offered a role but refused.

== Release ==
The film was released in Italian cinemas by Fida on 11 February 1977. The version released in the United Kingdom was heavily cut.

== Reception ==
Italian film critic Marco Giusti described it as the most expensive, yet also the most ordinary, among the erotic films directed by D'Amato, and pointed out that the film is highly derivative of Luigi Zampa's Be Sick... It's Free and of Mariano Laurenti's comedies of the time. Corriere della Sera film critic Maurizio Porro described it as a film that "trivializes everything it touches and involutes each and every joke".
