= Pierino medico della S.A.U.B. =

1981 film

- Directed by: Giuliano Carnimeo
- Written by: Gino Capone; Giorgio Mariuzzo
- Story by: Ugo Tucci
- Starring: Alvaro Vitali
- Cinematography: Federico Zanni
- Music by: Piero Piccioni
- Distributed by: Variety Distribution
- Release date: 1981
- Language: Italian

Pierino medico della S.A.U.B. is a 1981 Italian comedy film directed by Giuliano Carnimeo and starring Alvaro Vitali.

== Plot ==
Alvaro Gasperoni (nicknamed Pierino), a Roman simpleton, with a school career characterized by the elementary school certificate obtained in Rome, the middle one in Frosinone, the high school one in Catanzaro and the high school one in Canicattì, obtained with relative difficulty a coveted degree in medicine in Addis Ababa (Ethiopia); the more the school is southwards, the less it was demanding to issue diplomas. Thanks to his father's powerful recommendation obtained by the P2 Masonic lodge, he soon began working as a doctor in a Roman hospital, surrounded by rampant but equally incompetent colleagues.

The head physician of the clinic states that "the value of a doctor is measured by the number of patients he has", and therefore Alvaro has all his relatives hospitalized to obtain the vice-primary chair, which he actually obtains only to be fired by the councilor for health who, disguised as a simple patient, had been admitted to check the progress of the health facility.

== Cast ==
- Alvaro Vitali as Alvaro Gasperoni / Pippetto
- Mario Carotenuto as Mario Gasperoni
- Serena Bennato as Domenica
- Mario Feliciani as Dr. Tambroni
- Pino Ferrara as Dr. Ardito
- Angelo Pellegrino as Dr. Ragusa
- Anna Campori as Sister Celestina
- Ester Carloni as Grandma
- Enzo Garinei as Examiner
- Gianni Ciardo as Nicola
- Ennio Antonelli as Uncle Nando
- Sabrina Siani as Nurse
- Dino Cassio as Male Nurse
- Fernando Cerulli as Inspector

== See also ==
- List of Italian films of 1981
