= Giulio Scarnicci =

Italian screenwriter (1913–1973)

- Born: 5 May 1913; Florence, Tuscany, Italy
- Died: 13 July 1973 (aged 60); Rome, Lazio, Italy
- Occupation: Screenwriter
- Years active: 1951–1973 (film)

Giulio Scarnicci (5 May 1913 – 13 July 1973) was an Italian screenwriter. He worked on more than thirty films, including the screenplay for the 1960 horror film My Friend, Dr. Jekyll.

== Selected filmography ==
- The Two Sergeants (1951)
- My Friend, Dr. Jekyll (1960)
- His Women (1961)
- L'arbitro (1974)
