= Mia moglie torna a scuola =

1981 film by Giuliano Carnimeo

- Directed by: Giuliano Carnimeo
- Written by: Gianfranco Couyoumdjian; Carlo Veo; Giorgio Mariuzzo
- Produced by: Gianfranco Couyoumdjian
- Starring: Renzo Montagnani; Carmen Russo
- Cinematography: Sebastiano Celeste
- Music by: Walter Rizzati
- Distributed by: Variety Distribution
- Release date: 24 July 1981
- Running time: 94 minutes
- Country: Italy
- Language: Italian

Mia moglie torna a scuola is a 1981 commedia sexy all'italiana film directed by Giuliano Carnimeo and starring Renzo Montagnani with Carmen Russo, an early 1980s star of the genre.

== Plot ==
Aristide Buratti (Montagnani) is a wealthy grocer married to attractive Valentina (Russo). Although they seem to have a happy marriage, Valentina feels herself culturally inferior because she is a high school drop out. Despite her husband's objections, she enrolls at a private boarding liceo for her maturità. Valentina thinks her natural charms will bring her success before the examination board and she inevitably becomes the centre of attraction for the school staff, particularly the nerdy teacher Pier Capponi (Enzo Robutti). On the other hand, Aristide gets increasingly jealous of Valentina. He now seeks to infiltrate the school in disguise and starts bribing the janitor (Toni Ucci) to serve this end.

== Cast ==
- Renzo Montagnani as Aristide Buratti
- Carmen Russo as Valentina Buratti
- Enzo Robutti as Pier Capponi
- Toni Ucci as Gustavo, the janitor
- Marisa Merlini as principal
- Cinzia De Ponti as Giulia
