= Cinzia De Ponti =

Italian actress and Miss Italia 1979

- Born: Cinzia Fiordeponti; 3 October 1960 (age 65); Pescara, Italy
- Occupations: Actress; model; television host
- Title: • Miss Italia 1979 (Winner) • Miss Universe 1982 (2nd Runner-up)

Cinzia Fiordeponti, best known as Cinzia De Ponti (born 3 October 1960), is an Italian actress, model, television personality and beauty pageant titleholder who was crowned Miss Italia 1979 and second runner-up to Miss Universe 1982.

== Life and career ==
De Ponti was born in Pescara. In 1979, while a law student at Teramo University, she won the Miss Italia beauty contest. She later won the 1982 Miss Universo Italia contest and entered the Miss Universe 1982 competition, ranking third.

De Ponti studied as an actress at the "Studio di arti sceniche" drama school led by Alessandro Fersen. She appeared in a number of films in the 1980s, alternating main roles in comedy and genre films and minor roles in art films. Since the second half of the 1980s, she focused on television, working as an actress and a presenter.

== Filmography ==
Year	Title	Role	Notes
1980	La liceale al mare con l'amica di papà	Laura - lover of Massimo	
1981	Mia moglie torna a scuola	Giulia	
1981	Perché non facciamo l'amore?	Irene - Renato's wife	
1981	Ski Mistress	Carla	
1981	Il marito in vacanza	Antonietta Liberti	
1982	The New York Ripper	Rosie - Ferry victim	
1982	Vigili e vigilesse	Carolina Agnolotti	
1982	An Ideal Adventure	Zafferi's Daughter	
1982	Manhattan Baby	Jamie Lee	
1982	Sturmtruppen 2 (tutti al fronte)		
1983	Notturno	Carol Dexter	
1984	Monster Shark	Florinda	
1984	Uccelli d'Italia	Monsignor's Lover - The first slapping Actress	
1985	Power of Evil		
1985	Killer vs. Killers	His Excellency's Secretary	
1985	Carabinieri si nasce	Ragazza russa	
1986	Senza scrupoli	Clara	
1986	Fotoromanzo	Sissy	
1986	Yuppies - I giovani di successo	Woman in red	
1987	L'estate sta finendo	Monica	
1987	White Apache	Isabella	
1987	The Last Minute	Ornella	
1988	Un amore di donna	Cinzia	
