= Killer Crocodile 2 =

1990 Italian horror film

- Theatrical release poster
- Directed by: Giannetto De Rossi
- Written by: Fabrizio De Angelis; Giannetto De Rossi; Dardano Sacchetti
- Starring: Anthony Crenna; Debra Karr; Thomas Moore
- Music by: Riz Ortolani
- Production company: Fulvia Film
- Release date: 1990
- Running time: 87 minutes
- Country: Italy
- Language: Italian

Killer Crocodile 2 is a 1990 Italian horror film directed by Giannetto De Rossi, who also co-wrote the screenplay with Fabrizio De Angelis (credited as Larry Ludman) and Dardano Sacchetti (as David Parker Jr.). The film is the sequel to 1989's Killer Crocodile, and stars Anthony Crenna and Thomas Moore, reprising their roles from the previous film, along with Debra Karr.

== Plot ==
Some time after the events of the first film, efforts are made to clean up the radioactive waste from the tropical island to make it attractive as a tourist destination. However, a reporter soon discovers a conspiracy to hide the truth about the pollution and the supposed clean-up, and encounters Kevin and Joe, who maintain in the area. They soon face not only a group of violent thugs trying to silence them, but also another giantic crocodile.

== Cast ==
- Anthony Crenna as Kevin
- Debra Karr as Liza
- Thomas Moore as Joe

== Production ==
Killer Crocodile 2 was shot back-to-back with its predecessor, Killer Crocodile. Makeup artist Giannetto De Rossi, who created the crocodile and served as makeup artist on the first film, served as director on Killer Crocodile 2. The final cut also repurposes several shots from the first film, sometimes mirroring them to make the re-use less obvious.

== Reception ==
In a 2022 review of both Killer Crocodile 2 and its predecessor, Paul Lê of Bloody Disgusting wrote: "The recycling of past footage helps pad the runtime, the man-operated croc prop somehow seems more stiff this time around, and the conclusion is rushed. All in all, Killer Crocodile 2 is more of the same but now with only half the charm and spirit."

== Home media ==
2K restorations of both Killer Crocodile 2 and the first film were released as a limited edition 2-disc Blu-ray set on September 24, 2019, by Severin Films. Both films are available for streaming on Tubi.
