= L'arbitro (1974 film) =

1974 film

- Directed by: Luigi Filippo D'Amico
- Written by: Raimondo Vianello; Sandro Continenza; Giulio Scarnicci
- Produced by: Gianni Hecht Lucari
- Starring: Lando Buzzanca; Joan Collins
- Cinematography: Sergio D'Offizi
- Music by: Guido & Maurizio De Angelis
- Release date: 1974
- Country: Italy
- Language: Italian

L'arbitro (internationally released as Playing the Field, Football Crazy and The Referee) is a 1974 comedy film directed by Luigi Filippo D'Amico. The main character, Carmelo Lo Cascio, is inspired on the referee Concetto Lo Bello. The theme song, "Football Crazy", is sung by the football player Giorgio Chinaglia.

== Cast ==
- Lando Buzzanca as Carmelo Lo Cascio
- Joan Collins as Elena Sperani
- Gabriella Pallotta as Laura, wife of Lo Cascio
- Ignazio Leone as Fichera
- Marisa Solinas as Luisella, wife of Fichera
- Massimo Mollica as La Forgia
- Daniele Vargas as the president
- Maurizio Barendson as himself
- Alfredo Pigna as himself
- Bruno Pizzul as himself
- Nicolò Carosio as himself
- Antonio La Raina
- Gianfranco Barra as policeman in Terni
- Dino Curcio
- Giovanni Rosselli
- Umberto D'Orsi as the doctor
- Dante Cleri
- Renato Terra
- Pasquale Vitiello
- Orazio Stracuzzi
- Carla Mancini
- Alvaro Vitali as the postman

== See also ==
- List of Italian films of 1974
