= Toni Ucci =

Italian actor

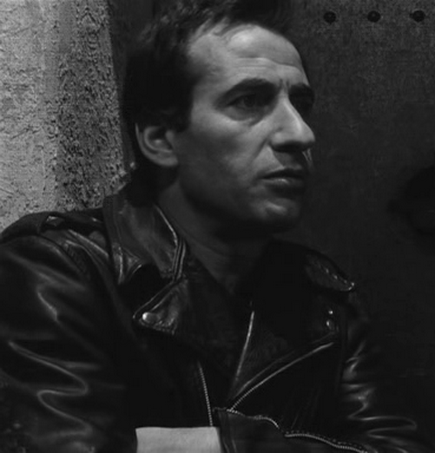
- Toni Ucci in the movie The Assassin (1961)
- Born: Antonio Ucci; 13 January 1922; Rome, Italy
- Died: 16 or 19 February 2014 (aged 92); Rome, Italy
- Occupation: Actor
- Years active: 1948–2000

Antonio "Toni" Ucci (13 January 1922 – 16 or 19 February 2014) was an Italian actor and comedian. He appeared in 86 films between 1948 and 2000.

Born in Rome, he started his career in the revue and got his first successes in cabaret. Ucci worked assiduously in the theater, playing comedies of all genres, including musical comedies. He had a distinguished career as a character actor in films and, since 1959, in television films and series.

== Selected filmography ==
- Cuore (1948)
- The Emperor of Capri (1949) - Pupetto Turacciolo
- Assi alla ribalta (1954) - Barman (uncredited)
- Wild Love (1956) - Il presentatore alla Forbici d'Oro
- Peccato di castità (1956)
- La canzone del destino (1957) - Gino
- Serenate per 16 bionde (1957) - Paolo
- The Love Specialist (1957) - Carlo (uncredited)
- Non cantare... baciami! (1957)
- The Friend of the Jaguar (1959) - Gettone
- La cento chilometri (1959) - The Race Walker Searching for His Watch
- Il terrore dell'Oklahoma (1959) - Joe
- The Facts of Murder (1959) - 2° Ladro (Er Patata)
- La cambiale (1959) - Ursus' Agent
- Audace colpo dei soliti ignoti (1959) - Totocalcio driver
- Simpatico mascalzone (1959) - Remo
- Il raccomandato di ferro (1959)
- Tough Guys (1960) - Beaurivage
- The Passionate Thief (1960) - L'amico di Milena
- Appuntamento a Ischia (1960) - Man at the Bar (uncredited)
- Le olimpiadi dei mariti (1960) - Waiter
- Ferragosto in bikini (1960) - Raffaele
- Psycosissimo (1961) - Augustarello (uncredited)
- The Assassin (1961) - Toni
- Pesci d'oro e bikini d'argento (1961) - Operaio
- Appuntamento in Riviera (1962) - Giacomo
- Sexy Toto (1963)
- The Two Colonels (1963) - Mazzetta
- Toto and Cleopatra (1963) - Nasone
- I terribili 7 (1963) - Romolo, Tramviere
- Corpse for the Lady (1964) - Michele
- Amore facile (1964) - Giulio (segment "Una domenica d'agosto")
- Three Nights of Love (1964) - Peppino (segment "La moglie bambina")
- Latin Lovers (1965) - Augusto (segment "La grande conquista")
- Spiaggia libera (1966) - Nando
- Mano di velluto (1966)
- Honeymoon, Italian Style (1966) - Pallino
- The Million Dollar Countdown (1967) - Theo
- Vacanze sulla Costa Smeralda (1968) - Schiavone
- I ragazzi di Bandiera Gialla (1968) - Burgunzi
- Indovina chi viene a merenda? (1969) - Paratroopers Commander
- Ninì Tirabusciò: la donna che inventò la mossa (1970) - Nando
- La ragazza del prete (1970) - Il Giaguaro
- Boccaccio (1972) - Pietro da Vinciolo
- Without Family (1972) - Male Nurse
- Il santo patrono (1972) - Brambilla
- Jus primae noctis (1972) - Guidone
- La calandria (1972) - Un Popolano
- Storia de fratelli e de cortelli (1973) - Silvio
- I racconti di Viterbury - Le più allegre storie del '300 (1973) - Nicolo
- Rugantino (1973) - Principe Niccolò Capitelli
- The Gamecock (1974) - The Friar
- 4 marmittoni alle grandi manovre (1974) - Caporale Riccardini
- Sesso in testa (1974) - Lanfranco Ceccarelli
- The Last Desperate Hours (1974) - Bellyache
- Attenti... arrivano le collegiali! (1975) - Commander
- The Messiah (1975) - Herod Antipas
- Strip First, Then We Talk (1975)
- San Pasquale Baylonne protettore delle donne (1976) - Renato - the castrate
- The Cop in Blue Jeans (1976) - Lando Rossi - aka Grottaferrata
- Hit Squad (1976) - Filotto
- A Special Cop in Action (1976) - Cacace
- Batton Story (1976) - Carlo
- Ladies' Doctor (1977) - Nestore Arlotti
- Per amore di Poppea (1977) - Tigellino
- How to Lose a Wife and Find a Lover (1978) - Brother Francesco
- Per favore, occupati di Amelia (1981) - Il maresciallo
- Mia moglie torna a scuola (1981) - Gustavo
- Care amiche mie (1981)
- Pierino colpisce ancora (1982) - Francesco - portiere del collegio
- Più bello di così si muore (1982) - Agenore
- I camionisti (1982)
- Porca vacca (1982) - Soldato romano
- Attila flagello di Dio (1982) - Fabio Massimo
- La ragazza del metrò (1989) - Barbone
- Fiori di zucca (1990) - Giovanni
- Breath of Life (1990) - Anziano
- Captain Fracassa's Journey (1991) - The tyrant
- Lia, rispondi (1992)
- Gole ruggenti (1992) - Gianni - the director
- The Heroes (1994) - Sor Pepe
- Ponte Milvio (2000) - Aldo (final film role)
