= Images in a Convent =

- Directed by: Joe D'Amato
- Written by: Tito Carpi (as Tom Salima)
- Produced by: Kristal Film [Franco Gaudenzi]
- Starring: Paola Senatore, Marina Hedman
- Cinematography: Joe D'Amato (as Aristide Massaccesi)
- Edited by: Vincenzo Vanni
- Music by: Nico Fidenco
- Distributed by: Variety Distribution
- Release date: August 7, 1979
- Running time: 83 minutes (2266 m); 93 minutes (NTSC hard version); 85 minutes (soft version)
- Country: Italy
- Language: Italian

Images in a Convent (Italian: Immagini di un convento) is a 1979 sexploitation horror film by Italian cult filmmaker Joe D'Amato starring Paola Senatore, Marina Hedman and Donald O'Brien.

The film belongs to the 'nunsploitation' subgenre. It contains strong scenes of graphic violence relating to demonic possession and is among few films containing original hardcore pornography that already passed Italian censorship in 1979 and were projected in some Italian cinemas. It includes explicit lesbianic depictions of digital penetration and cunnilingus.

== Plot ==
Behind the walls of a secluded convent, the nuns commit sexual acts at night with each other, while living in fear that their Mother Superior may learn of their transgressions.

One day, an injured man appears at the convent and the sisters take him in. One by one, the nuns become attracted to the man and take turns visiting his room at night. Unbeknownst to them, Satan has also entered the convent and is turning the nuns into horny sinners.

Finally, an exorcist is sent to the convent to drive out Satan and restore godliness to the monastery's lustful inhabitants.

== Cast ==
Credited:

- Paola Senatore: Isabella
- Marina Hedman: suor Marta
- Paola Maiolini: suor Consolata
- Angelo Arquilla: Lieutenant Guido Bencio
- Aïché Nana: Sister Angela, the Mother Superior
- Maria Rosaria Riuzzi: Sister Giulia
- Giovanna Mainardi: Sister Veronica
- Ferrucio Fregonese: Cardinal Del Lario
- Plard Sylviane Anne Marie
- Pietro Zardini: Cesco, the gardener
- Brunello Chiodetti: Don Ascanio, Isabella's uncle and lover
- Donald O'Brien: Father Arnoldo, the exorcist

Uncredited:

- Giuseppe Curia: one of the two bandits who rape Sister Marta
- Sisto Brunetti: the other bandit

== Production ==
The film's working title was La casa del dio sconosciuto (literal translation: "The house of the unknown god"). The initial cast as officially deposited was Gloria Guida as Isabella and Gabriele Tinti as Guido Bencio, Paola Arduini as Sister Lucrezia and Anna Maria Romoli as Sister Marta.

== Literary and cinematic influences ==
On the pages preceding the copy of the script deposited at the Ministerio Dello Spettacolo on February 24, 1979, it says that the film is "very loosely inspired by Prosper Mérimée's La Vénus d'Ille before quoting Blaise Pascal's saying, "The last function of reason is to recognize that there are an infinity of things which surpass it".

The main cinematic influence was Walerian Borowczyk's Interno di un convento (1977; literally: Interior of a Convent; English title: Behind Convent Walls), which claimed to be influenced by Stendhal's Promenades romaines just as Immagini di un convento claims to be inspired by La Religieuse by Denis Diderot. However, the only parallels between the film and Diderot's novel are the general immorality of the clergy, the arrival of an aristocratic novice without vocation at a convent, and the wounded officer.

== Release ==
=== Theatrical ===
The film was released in Italy on August 7, 1979, and was screened in 4 cities (including Turin and Milan) with a total of 14.307 spectators in the first year.

In France, the film was released theatrically in February 1981 under the title Les amours interdites d'une religieuse.

=== Home video ===
In Italy, the film was released on VHS in its soft version by Avo, Vega Video, and New Video, and in a hard version by Shendene & Moizzi, which however lacks the introductory part with Paola Senatore and Brunello Chiodetti.

In the Netherlands, the Italian version was published under the title Intieme Kloosterbeelden by VFP (Video for Pleasure). In Greece, the hard version was published on VHS in Italian with Greek subtitles with a few cuts, among them the sequence with Senatore and Chiodetti.

In the United States, the film was released on June 14, 2005, as Images in a Convent on DVD by Media Blasters in its hard version from which three minutes of Marina Ambrosini's scene of diabolical possession were cut. It contains the film only in its Italian dub with no menu option to remove the yellow English subtitles, though they are easily switched off via the user's control.

== Film connections ==
In 1986, D'Amato directed another nunsploitation film, Convent of Sinners.

== Reception ==
When he first saw the film at the red light cinema "Il Filodrammatico" in Trieste, film critic Marco Giusti remembers being impressed, also because he did not expect real penetrations; "after all, it was about nuns...".

== Bibliography ==
- Giusti, Marco (1999). dizionario dei film italiani STRACULT [sic]. Cles: Sterling & Kupfer. ISBN 88-200-2919-7.
- Grattarola, Franco; Napoli, Andrea (2014). Luce Rossa. La nascita e le prime fasi del cinema pornografico in Italia. Roma: Iacobelli Editore. ISBN 9788862522137.
