= Paola Senatore =

Italian film and pornographic actress (born 1949)

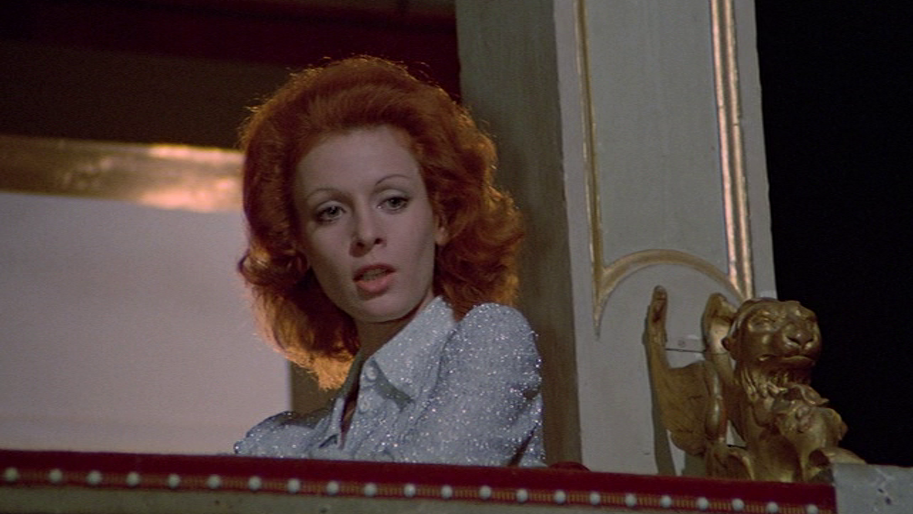
- Senatore in The Killer Reserved Nine Seats 1974
- Born: 9 November 1949 (age 76); Rome, Italy
- Occupations: Actress; pornographic actress

Paola Senatore (born 9 November 1949) is an Italian retired pornographic and film actress.

== Biography ==
Born in Rome, Paola Senatore worked in Italian genre films during the 1970s, including poliziotteschi, commedia sexy all'italiana and giallo films. These included cult films such as Ricco the Mean Machine (1973), Story of a Cloistered Nun (1973), The Flower with the Petals of Steel (1973), The Killer Reserved Nine Seats (1974), Salon Kitty (1976), Emanuelle in America (1977), Images in a Convent (1979) and Umberto Lenzi's cannibal film Eaten Alive! (1980). In the mid-1980s, after two soft-core erotic films directed by Joe D'Amato and because of drug problems and pregnancy, she accepted starring in pornographic magazines and in a hard-core film, Non stop... sempre buio in sala.

Her film career ended in September 1985 when she was arrested for possession and trafficking of drugs. She was sentenced to five months of imprisonment followed by a year of house arrest.

== Partial filmography ==
- Robin Hood: the Invincible Archer (1970)
- A.A.A. Massaggiatrice bella presenza offresi... (1972) - Cristina Graziani
- Donnez-nous notre amour quotidien (1973) - Beatrice
- Women in Cell Block 7 (1973) - 'Mammasantissima' lover
- Ricco the Mean Machine (1973) - Concetta Aversi
- Servo suo (1973)
- Story of a Cloistered Nun (1973) - Michela
- The Flower with the Petals of Steel (1973) - Daniela
- Provaci anche tu Lionel (1973)
- The Killer Reserved Nine Seats (1974) - Lynn Davenant
- Madeleine, anatomia di un incubo (1974) - Mary
- Erotomania (1974) - Onorevole Belloni
- Un amour comme le nôtre (1974) - Béatrice
- Zig Zig (1975) - Madame Bruyère
- Salon Kitty (1976) - Marika
- Càlamo (1976) - Serena
- Like Rabid Dogs (1976) - Germana
- Emanuelle in America (1977) - Laura Elvize
- Ladies' Doctor (1977) - Pamela
- Oil! (1977) - Diana Astor
- Impossible Love (1977) - Rosa
- Nenè (1977) - Ju and Pa's Mother
- La mujer de la tierra caliente (1978) - Ángela
- Bersaglio altezza uomo (1978) - La pupa dei gangsters
- Night Nurse (1979) - Zaira
- Where Can You Go Without the Little Vice? (1979) - Simona
- Images in a Convent (1979) - Isabella
- Don't Trust the Mafia (1979) - Paulette Maurice
- Action (1980) - Ann Shimpton
- Eaten Alive! (1980) - Diana
- The Week at the Beach (1981) - Margareth
- La dottoressa preferisce i marinai (1981) - Paola
- Ti spacco il muso, bimba! (1982) - Lidia
- Malombra (1984) - Carlotta / Marco's aunt
- Maladonna (1984) - Maria / Osvaldo's Wife
- Non stop sempre buio in sala (1985)
- La sfida erotica (1986)
- Penombra (1987) - Maria / Carlotta (final film role)
