= Ennio Girolami =

Italian actor (1935–2013)

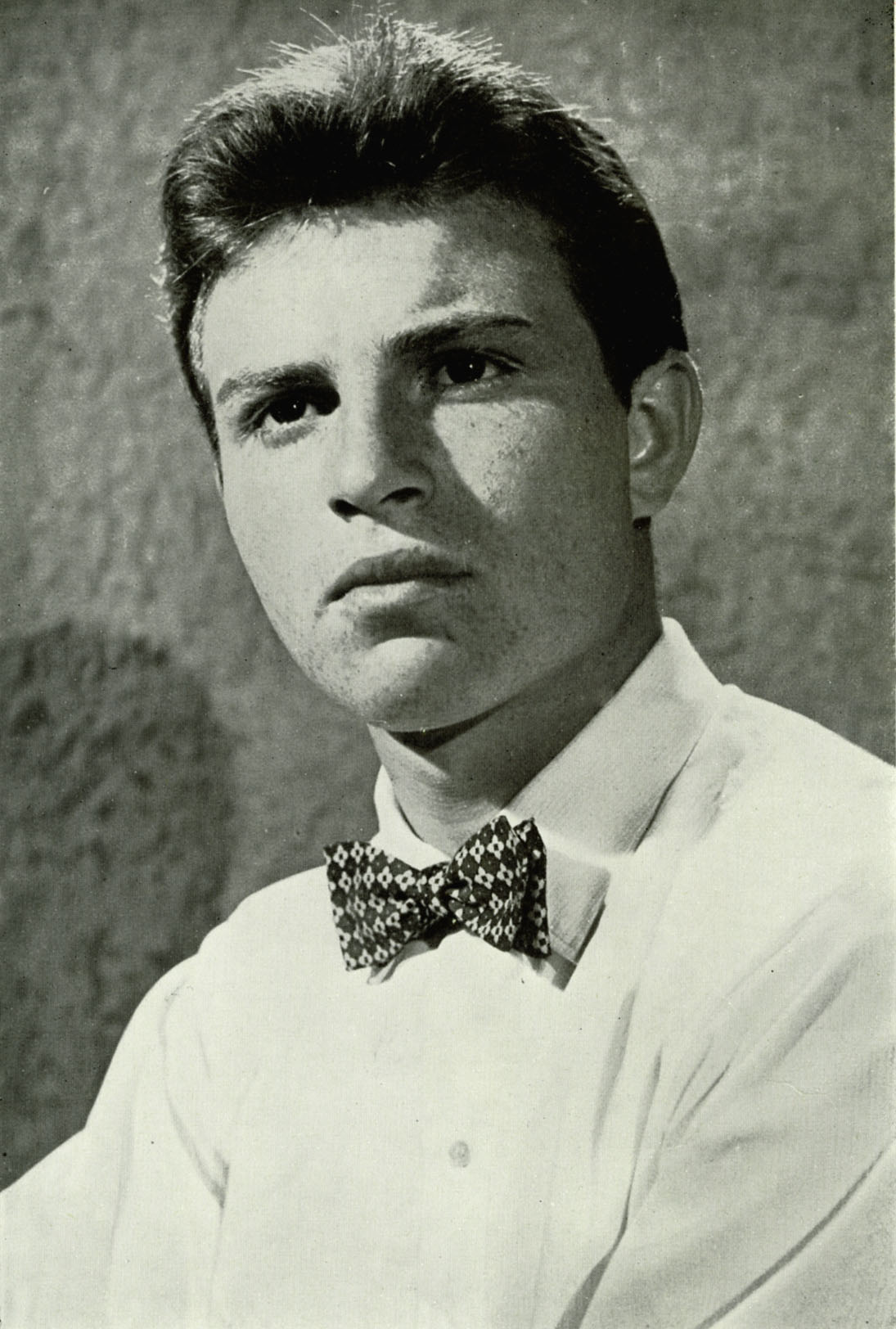
- Born: 14 January 1935; Rome, Italy
- Died: 16 February 2013 (aged 78); Rome, Italy
- Other name: Thomas Moore
- Occupation: Actor
- Years active: 1952–2003

Enio Girolami (14 January 1935 – 16 February 2013), sometimes credited as Thomas Moore, was an Italian film and television actor.

Born in Rome, son of director Marino Girolami and brother of director Enzo G. Castellari, Girolami made his film debut at 18 with a role of weight in Fratelli d'Italia by Fausto Saraceni. He then appeared in many films, sometimes as main actor, working among others with Alberto Lattuada, Federico Fellini, Mauro Bolognini and Giuseppe De Santis. From 1960 he worked almost exclusively with his father and brother.

== Selected filmography ==
- Brothers of Italy (1952) - Sergio
- Poppy (1952) - Marocchi
- Il viale della speranza (1953) - Piazzoni (uncredited)
- Ci troviamo in galleria (1953) - Uno spettatore intransigente
- The Beach (1954) - Riccardo
- Il seduttore (1954) - The Singer with a Guitar in the Restaurant (uncredited)
- Ho ritrovato mio figlio (1954) - Marco
- Loves of Three Queens (1954) - Minor Role (uncredited)
- Ultima illusione (1954)
- Il cantante misterioso (1955) - Paolo
- Ore 10: lezione di canto (1955) - Ennio - uno dei Five Jolly
- Faccia da mascalzone (1956)
- Il suo più grande amore (1956) - Giangiacomo - il figlio di Rita
- I miliardari (1956) - Pinella
- Nights of Cabiria (1957) - Amleto, 'il magnaccia'
- Sette canzoni per sette sorelle (1957) - Luigi
- Marisa (1957) - Soldier
- C'è un sentiero nel cielo (1957) - Emilio Hernandez
- Vacanze a Ischia (1957) - Furio
- Young Husbands (1958) - Franco Marchetti
- Si le roi savait ça (1958)
- Quando gli angeli piangono (1958) - Ennio
- Girls for the Summer (1958) - Walter
- I ragazzi dei Parioli (1959) - Fabrizio
- Quel tesoro di papà (1959) - Franco
- Le notti dei Teddy Boys (1959) - Nino
- Quanto sei bella Roma (1959) - Carlo
- Spavaldi e innamorati (1959) - Romano
- Il principe fusto (1960) - Amico di Ettore
- Caccia al marito (1960) - Claudio Massa - Giulia's fiancé
- La garçonnière (1960) - Alvaro
- Ferragosto in bikini (1960) - Dario
- La ragazza sotto il lenzuolo (1961) - Gianni - the barman (uncredited)
- Bellezze sulla spiaggia (1961) - Franco
- Le magnifiche 7 (1961) - Marco
- Un figlio d'oggi (1961) - Renzo
- The Fury of Achilles (1962) - Patroclus
- Gli italiani e le donne (1962) - Nando (segment "I Galli del Colosseo")
- Twist, lolite e vitelloni (1962) - Vittorio Emmanuele
- L'assassino si chiama Pompeo (1962) - Carlo Landi
- The Shortest Day (1963) - Soldato (uncredited)
- Le motorizzate (1963) - Activist of Communist Party (segment "Carmelitane Sprint")
- Siamo tutti pomicioni (1963) - Ennio (segment "Colonnello e signora")
- Jacob and Esau (1963) - Esaù giovane - Young Esau
- Cleopazza (1964)
- Queste pazze pazze donne (1964) - Nando ('Il gentil sesso')
- Bullets and the Flesh (1964) - Sam Masters
- Veneri in collegio (1965)
- Veneri al sole (1965) - Mario Giorgetti (segment "Intrigo al mare")
- Spiaggia libera (1966) - Ciccio
- A Few Dollars for Django (1966) - Sam Lister
- The Hellbenders (1967) - Lieutenant Soublette
- Da Berlino l'apocalisse (1967) - (scenes deleted)
- Renegade Riders (1967) - Chamaco Gonzales
- A Ghentar si muore facile (1967) - Kim
- Due rrringos nel Texas (1967) - Bruce
- Johnny Hamlet (1968) - Ross
- One Dollar Too Many (1968) - Stagecoach Guard (uncredited)
- Between God, the Devil and a Winchester (1968) - Marco Serraldo
- I 2 magnifici fresconi (1969) - Berti - Police Commissioner
- Don Franco e Don Ciccio nell'anno della contestazione (1969) - Tenente dei Carabinieri
- Reverend's Colt (1970) - Mestizo
- Las amantes del diablo (1971) - Dr. Carlos Ferrer
- Decameron proibitissimo (Boccaccio mio statte zitto) (1972) - Rinaldo
- Maria Rosa la guardona (1973)
- Roma, l'altra faccia della violenza (1976) - Commissario Ferreri
- Day of the Cobra (1980) - Martino
- Great White (1981) - Matt Rosen
- Giggi il bullo (1982) - Discotheque manager
- Tenebrae (1982) - Department Store Manager
- 1990: The Bronx Warriors (1982) - Samuel Fisher
- The New Barbarians (1983) - Shadow
- Escape from the Bronx (1983) - President Henry Clark
- Tuareg – The Desert Warrior (1984)
- Light Blast (1985) - Dr. Yuri Soboda
- Operation Nam (1986)
- Sinbad of the Seven Seas (1989) - Viking
- Killer Crocodile (1989) - Joe
- Killer Crocodile 2 (1990) - Joe
- Jonathan of the Bears (1994) - Goodwin's Mercenary
- Li chiamarono... briganti! (1999)
- Maximum Velocity (V-Max) (2002) - Padre di Stefano
