= La liceale nella classe dei ripetenti =

1978 film by Mariano Laurenti

- Italian theatrical release poster
- Directed by: Mariano Laurenti
- Starring: Gloria Guida; Lino Banfi
- Music by: Gianni Ferrio
- Release date: 1978
- Country: Italy
- Language: Italian

La liceale nella classe dei ripetenti (literally The high school girl in the class of repeaters) is a 1978 commedia sexy all'italiana directed by Mariano Laurenti. It is the second chapter in the "Liceale" film-series and was followed by La liceale seduce i professori. Alvaro Vitali, who played a student in the first film, plays a teacher in this one.

== Plot ==
Angela is studying in the school where her father teaches. She is a beautiful girl and despite her boyfriend Tonino's lack of physical charms, she insists to be faithful to him. But when she discovers that she had been repeatedly betrayed, she decides to take revenge allowing herself to Carlo, who has been in love with her for a lifetime.

== Cast ==
- Gloria Guida: Angela Cantalupo
- Lino Banfi: Zenobio Cantalupo
- Gianfranco D'Angelo: Prof. Pinzarrone
- Alvaro Vitali: Prof. Modesti
- Rodolfo Bigotti: Carlo
- Carlo Sposito: The principal
- Ria De Simone: Tecla, the Bolognese

== Related films ==
- La liceale (1975)
- La liceale seduce i professori (1979)
- La liceale, il diavolo e l'acquasanta (1979), anthology film
- La liceale al mare con l'amica di papà (1980), without Gloria Guida
