= Crimebusters (film) =

1976 film by Michele Massimo Tarantini

- Directed by: Michele Massimo Tarantini
- Screenplay by: Adriano Belli; Michele Massimo Tarantini; Franco Ferrini; Sauro Scavolini
- Story by: Adriano Belli; Michele Massimo Tarantini
- Produced by: Giulio Scanni
- Starring: Henry Silva; Antonio Sabàto
- Cinematography: Giancarlo Ferrando
- Edited by: Attilio Vincioni
- Music by: Guido and Maurizio De Angelis
- Production companies: Staff Professionisti Associati; Capitol International
- Distributed by: Capitol
- Release date: May 11, 1976 (Italy)
- Running time: 92 minutes
- Country: Italy
- Box office: ₤699 million

Crimebusters (Italian: Poliziotti violenti), is a 1976 Italian poliziottesco film directed by Michele Massimo Tarantini.

== Cast ==
- Henry Silva as Major Paolo Altieri
- Antonio Sabàto as Police Commissioner Paolo Tosi
- Ettore Manni as Lawyer Vieri
- Silvia Dionisio as Anna
- Claudio Nicastro as General
- Daniele Dublino as Lieutenant
- Rosario Borelli as Officer in Turin
- Benito Stefanelli as thug
- Franca Scagnetti as woman in the park

== Release ==
The film was shot at the Elios Film studios in Rome.

== Release ==
Crimebusters was released theatrically in Italy on May 11, 1976, where it was distributed by Capitol. It grossed a total of 698,998,550 Italian lire.

== Reception ==
Roberto Curti, author of Italian Crime Filmography, 1968-1980 stated that the film was "standard fare", finding the political angle of the film rushed.

== See also ==
- List of Italian films of 1976
