= A Policewoman in New York =

1981 film by Michele Massimo Tarantini

La poliziotta a New York
- Italian theatrical release poster by Enzo Sciotti
- Directed by: Michele Massimo Tarantini
- Starring: Edwige Fenech
- Cinematography: Giancarlo Ferrando
- Music by: Berto Pisano
- Release date: November 21, 1981 (Italy)
- Running time: 91 minutes
- Country: Italy
- Language: Italian

La poliziotta a New York (internationally released as A Policewoman in New York) is a 1981 commedia sexy all'italiana directed by Michele Massimo Tarantini. It is the final chapter in the "poliziotta" trilogy directed by Tarantini and starred by Edwige Fenech, with the first two films being Confessions of a Lady Cop (La poliziotta fa carriera, 1976) and A Policewoman on the Porno Squad (La poliziotta della squadra del buon costume, 1979).

== Cast ==
- Edwige Fenech as Gianna Amicucci/La Pupa
- Alvaro Vitali as Alvaro Tarallo/Joe Dodiciomicidi
- Aldo Maccione as Big John
- Renzo Montagnani as Mac Caron
- Giacomo Rizzo as Il Turco
- Enzo Andronico as the teacher of dialect
- Fidel Mbanga-Bauna as Gedeone
