= Giggi il bullo =

- Directed by: Marino Girolami
- Written by: Marino Girolami; Carlo Veo
- Starring: Alvaro Vitali; Adriana Russo
- Cinematography: Vincenzo Morozzi
- Edited by: Alberto Moriani
- Music by: Paolo Rustichelli
- Release date: 1982
- Language: Italian

Giggi il Bullo (transl. Giggi the bully) is a 1982 Italian comedy film directed by Marino Girolami.

== Cast ==
- Alvaro Vitali as Giggi
- Adriana Russo as Adriana
- Anna Campori as Giggi's mother
- Marcello Furgiuele as Peppe
- Susanna Fassetta as Raffaella
- Ennio Girolami as Ennio
- Gianfranco Barra as Totocalcio officer
- Diana Dei as Landlord's wife
- Venantino Venantini as Don Salvatore
- Cinzia De Carolis as Marietta
- Stefano Onofri as Ucelletto
