= Taxi Girl (film) =

1977 film by Michele Massimo Tarantini

- Directed by: Michele Massimo Tarantini
- Written by: Michele Massimo Tarantini; Francesco Milizia
- Produced by: Luciano Martino
- Starring: Edwige Fenech; Aldo Maccione
- Cinematography: Giancarlo Ferrando
- Edited by: Raimondo Crociani
- Music by: Pulsar
- Release date: 1977
- Country: Italy
- Language: Italian

Taxi Girl is a 1977 commedia sexy all'italiana co-written and directed by Michele Massimo Tarantini.

== Plot ==
A sexy hooker comes up with a plan to operate her own taxi service for her fellow streetwalkers as a safe way to make easy money.

== Cast ==
- Edwige Fenech: Marcella
- Aldo Maccione: Adone Adonis
- Michele Gammino: Walter
- Gianfranco D'Angelo: Isidoro
- Alvaro Vitali: Alvaro
- George Hilton: Ramon
- Enzo Cannavale: Commissioner Angelini
- Giacomo Rizzo: Rocco, Adonis' Secretary
- Gastone Pescucci: film director
- Rossana Di Lorenzo: Ornella
- Franco Diogene: sheikh Abdul Lala
- Franca Scagnetti: Arab woman
- Enzo Liberti: Marcella's father
- Adriana Facchetti: Marcella's mother

== See also ==
- List of Italian films of 1977
