= Spiaggia libera =

- Directed by: Marino Girolami
- Written by: Tito Carpi; Marino Girolami
- Cinematography: Alberto Fusi
- Release date: 1965
- Country: Italy
- Language: Italian

Spiaggia libera is a 1965 Italian comedy film directed by Marino Girolami.

== Cast ==
- Dominique Boschero: Pallina
- Riccardo Garrone: Riccardo
- Aldo Giuffrè: Cuccurallo
- Aroldo Tieri: Mario
- Raimondo Vianello: Captain Oliviero
- Alberto Lupo: The Engineer
- Sandra Mondaini: Maria
- Franca Polesello: Friend of Anna
- Toni Ucci: Nando
- Enzo Andronico: Maresciallo
- Ennio Girolami: Ciccio
- Francesco Mulé: False Priest
- Luigi Pavese: Colonel
- Nietta Zocchi: Countess
