= La dottoressa preferisce i marinai =

1981 film by Michele Massimo Tarantini

- Directed by: Michele Massimo Tarantini (as Michael E. Lemick)
- Written by: Francesco Miliazi; Gino Capone
- Produced by: Camillo Teti
- Starring: Alvaro Vitali; Gianni Ciardo]] Paola Senatore
- Cinematography: Federico Zanni
- Music by: Franco Campanino
- Release date: 1981
- Running time: 88 minutes
- Country: Italy
- Language: Italian

La dottoressa preferisce i marinai (translation: The Lady Doctor Prefers Sailors) is a 1981 commedia sexy all'italiana directed by Michele Massimo Tarantini, starring Alvaro Vitali with Gianni Ciardo as a comic duo.

== Plot ==
The ship of the Italian Navy commander Carlo Morelli (Renzo Palmer) anchors at Bari port and he arranges a rendezvous with his mistress Dr. Paola (Paola Senatore) at a hotel but who arrives is his wife Clara (Marisa Mell). Meanwhile, cleaners Alvaro (Vitali) and Gianni (Ciardo) witness a murder at the hotel and the assassin (Gordon Mitchell) starts trying to kill them. They are now in the middle of an international conspiracy.

== Cast ==
- Alvaro Vitali as Alvaro
- Gianni Ciardo as Gianni
- Renzo Palmer as Carlo Morelli
- Paola Senatore as Dr. Paola
- Marisa Mell as Clara Morelli
- Gordon Mitchell: Soviet spy
- Renzo Montagnani as suicide man
- Sabrina Siani as massage therapist
- Bruno Minniti as Lieutenant Ardenzi
- Renzo Ozzano as Captain Smith
- Lucio Montanaro as hotel attendant
