= Fidel Mbanga-Bauna =

- Born: 16 July 1948; Yangambi
- Occupations: Journalist, actor
- Height: 1.83 m (6 ft 0 in)

Fidel Mbanga-Bauna (born 16 July 1948 in Yangambi) is an Italian journalist. He was the first non-Mediterranean broadcaster on RAI and at the time the only non-Italian newsreader of the main evening news.

== filmography ==
- A Policewoman in New York (1981)
