= Ricco the Mean Machine =

1973 film

- Italian film poster
- Directed by: Tulio Demicheli
- Screenplay by: Santiago Moncada; José Gutiérrez Maesso; Mario Di Nardo
- Produced by: José Gutiérrez Maesso
- Starring: Christopher Mitchum; Barbara Bouchet; Malisa Longo; Arthur Kennedy
- Cinematography: Francisco Fraile
- Edited by: Ángel Serrano
- Music by: Nando De Luca
- Production companies: Tecisa; B.R.C. Produzione
- Distributed by: Excisa (Spain); Alpherat (Italy)
- Release date: August 23, 1973 (Italy)
- Running time: 94 minutes
- Countries: Spain; Italy
- Box office: ₤229.985 million (Italy)

Ricco the Mean Machine is a 1973 Italian-Spanish crime-thriller film directed by Tulio Demicheli and starring Christopher Mitchum and Barbara Bouchet. It acquired a cult following because of its violent and gory scenes, including a graphic castration. The US title was actually a misspelling of the main character's name Rico.

== Cast ==
- Christopher Mitchum as Rico Aversi
- Barbara Bouchet as Scilla Calogero
- Malisa Longo as Rosa Calogero
- Arthur Kennedy as Don Vito
- Eduardo Fajardo as Cyrano
- Manolo Zarzo as Tony
- José María Caffarel as The Marseillese
- Ángel Álvarez as Giuseppe Calogero
- Paola Senatore as Concetta Aversi
- Luis Induni as Don Gaspare Aversi
- Tomás Blanco as Police Commissioner
- Víctor Israel as Cicala, the Nightclub Owner
- José Canalejas as Don Vito's Henchman
- Luigi Antonio Guerra as Concetta's Husband
- Rina Franchetti as Mrs. Aversi
- Goyo Lebrero as Vittorio, the Truck Driver
- Antonio Mayans as Nightclub Bartender
- Lorenzo Robledo as Pepe, Don Vito's Henchman
- Domenico Maggio as Don Vito's Henchman
- Andrea Scotti as Policeman
- Carla Mancini as Girl at Bar
- Sergio Testori as Don Vito's Assassin (uncredited)

Credits adapted from Italian Crime Filmography, 1968–1980.
