= Jantje =

Jantje is a given name. Notable people with the name include:

- Jantje Friese (born 1977), German film producer and screenwriter
- Jantje Hagenou-Bathoorn (born 1934), Dutch speed skater
- Jantje Visscher, American painter, printmaker, photographer, sculptor, teacher, and mentor

== See also ==
- Jantjes
