= Killer Crocodile =

1989 Italian horror film

- Theatrical release poster
- Directed by: Fabrizio De Angelis
- Written by: Fabrizio De Angelis; Dardano Sacchetti
- Produced by: Fabrizio De Angelis
- Starring: Anthony Crenna; Ann Douglas; Thomas Moore; Wohrman Williams; Van Johnson
- Cinematography: Federico Del Zoppo
- Edited by: Vincenzo Tomassi
- Music by: Riz Ortolani
- Release date: 30 July 1989 (Italy)
- Running time: 90 minutes
- Country: Italy
- Languages: Italian; English

Killer Crocodile is a 1989 Italian horror film directed by Fabrizio De Angelis (credited as Larry Ludman), who co-wrote the screenplay with Dardano Sacchetti (as David Parker Jr.). It stars Anthony Crenna, Ann Douglas, Thomas Moore, Wohrman Williams and Van Johnson. The film's plot centers around a group of ecologists who, while investigating the illegal dumping of hazardous waste in a swamp, encounter an enormous, man-eating crocodile.

The film was shot back-to-back with a sequel, Killer Crocodile 2 (1990).

== Plot ==
On a tropical island, a team of ecologists are travelling through a polluted wetland, investigating the cause of the pollution. They trace its source to barrels of radioactive toxic waste that have been dumped in the waters. Deeming the waste too dangerous to examine further, they set up camp that night in the nearby woods. When the group's dog, Candy, disappears, their local guide Conchita ventures off to search for him; she finds Candy's collar and is killed by a gigantic crocodile.

The next morning, the ecologists notice that Conchita and Candy have disappeared, but are unable to find them. They dock their boat at a nearby village and head into town. They request help in finding Conchita from the local law enforcement official, Judge, but he insists there is nothing he can do. An argument ensues, during which Pamela accuses Judge of having been paid off by the company responsible for dumping the radioactive waste. After the group leaves, Judge requests of the shady Jim Foley that he temporarily cease his illegal dumping, but Foley dismisses him.

The ecologists head back out into the swamp, and accidentally run their boat into mud. Team members Kevin, Mark, Bob and Pamela enter the water to attempt to dislodge the boat, and Pamela discovers Conchita's mutilated corpse in the water. Her body is brought to a doctor in town, who suggests an animal or boat propeller as the cause of death; Judge and Foley, however, downplay these possibilities. Resident hunter Joe arrives and, after looking at Conchita's remains, determines she was killed by a crocodile. Later, the crocodile attacks a dock, killing two men and nearly eating a young girl whom the ecologists save.

Judge and Joe resolve to kill the crocodile, though the ecologists are against the notion, believing the creature to be an important discovery, and possibly a endling or endangered species. Bob hypothesizes that the crocodile's enormous size is a result of it being mutated by the radioactive waste. While Joe hunts for the crocodile, the ecologists again set up camp by the river. That night, Pamela sees the crocodile in the water, prompting Mark to get in their boat to take a photograph of it. Kevin and Bob follow to stop him, and the crocodile severs their anchor rope and begins destroying the vessel. Bob falls overboard and is eaten, and Kevin swims to shore, allowing them to tow the boat back to land.

The following day, the ecologists are picked up by Joe in his boat. The ecologists stay at Joe's house that night, where Kevin indicates that he now agrees the crocodile should be killed. The next day, Judge and Foley take a boat to one of their dumping sites in the swamp, where Foley rigs the drums of waste with explosives. Judge voices his opposition to detonating the barrels, as doing so will destroy the entire swamp; Foley punches Judge, sending him overboard, and drives off, only to be killed by the crocodile. The unmanned boat runs aground and explodes, attracting the attention of Joe and the ecologists.

Kevin and Joe head out on the river by boat, and come across Judge and Foley's corpses. Joe lures the crocodile to them and fires a gun at it to no avail. He jumps on the creature's back to stab it, and is taken underwater. Kevin returns to Joe's house and retrieves Mark. The two journey back out into the swamp, where the crocodile attacks the boat. A bloodied Joe calls out to Kevin from the shore, telling him to use the disconnected boat propeller to kill the creature. Kevin activates the propeller and throws it into the crocodile's mouth, causing the creature to explode. The three men depart, sailing past a crocodile egg that begins to hatch.

== Cast ==
- Anthony Crenna as Kevin
- Julian Hampton as Mark
- John Harper as Bob
- Sherrie Rose as Pamela
- Ann Douglas as Jennifer
- Thomas Moore as Joe
- Van Johnson as Judge
- Wohrman Williams as Foley

== Production ==
Killer Crocodile was shot back-to-back with its sequel Killer Crocodile 2 in the Dominican Republic. It was filmed on 35 mm film.

== Reception ==
In 2003, author Scott Aaron Stine criticized the film's score as derivative of the music in Jaws while commending the design of the crocodile, and wrote: "Having seen just about every killer animal film ever made, I actually found Killer Crocodile to be much better than expected, if only because of some good performances and an engaging storyline."

In 2019, Anthony Arrigo of Dread Central gave Killer Crocodile a score of 2.5/5 stars, similarly characterizing its score as "sound[ing] like [Ortolani] was directed to copy John Williams' legendary two-note motif", and writing that, "Killer Crocodile delivers by sheer force of will, packing as much insanity as possible into 94 minutes and hoping audiences will be too inundated with processing the craziness to notice there's only a threadbare plot holding everything together. Fans of killer crocodile movies, yea, you're gonna want this one."

In a 2022 review of both Killer Crocodile and its sequel, Bloody Disgusting's Paul Lê wrote that the first film "admittedly adds nothing new to its respective subgenre. Merciful and curious B-movie seekers, however, are sure to find enjoyment in this schlocky series. Ardent creature-feature fans are in the same boat; they can hardly pass up such a middling but entertaining croc flick."

== Home media ==
A 2K restoration of Killer Crocodile was released on Blu-ray in the U.S. on September 24, 2019, by Severin Films. Severin issued both a standard Blu-ray edition of the film, as well as a limited edition 2-disc release containing Blu-rays of both Killer Crocodile and Killer Crocodile 2. Both films are available for streaming on Tubi.

== See also ==
- List of killer crocodile films
- List of natural horror films
