= Roma, l'altra faccia della violenza =

- Film poster
- Directed by: Marino Girolami
- Screenplay by: Gianfranco Clerici; Vincenzo Mannino; Marie Claire Sinko Solleville
- Story by: Gianfranco Clerici; Vincenzo Mannino; Marie Claire Sinko Solleville
- Produced by: Fulvio Lucisano
- Starring: Marcel Bozzuffi; Anthony Steffen
- Cinematography: Gianna Bergamini
- Edited by: Daniele Alabiso
- Music by: Franco Bixio; Fabio Frizzi; Vincenzo Tempera
- Production companies: Italian International Films; Fox Europa
- Distributed by: 20th Century Fox
- Release dates: 27 July 1976 (Italy); 6 July 1977 (Paris)
- Running time: 91 minutes
- Countries: Italy; France

Roma, l'altra faccia della violenza (transl. Rome, the other side of violence) is a 1976 "poliziottesco" film directed by Marino Girolami and starring Marcel Bozzuffi.

== Cast ==
- Marcel Bozzuffi as Commissioner Carli
- Anthony Steffen as Dr. Alessi
- Enio Girolami as Commissioner Ferreri
- Roberta Paladini as Carol Alessi
- Jean Favre as Giulio Laurenti
- Stefano Patrizi as Giorgio Alessi
- Franco Citti as Berté
- Sergio Fiorentini as Nardi
- Umberto Liberati as Stefano
- Valerio Merola as Andrea
- Enzo Andronico as Tarantini, the lawyer
- Massimo Vanni as Vanni

== Release ==
Roma, l'altra faccia della violenza was distributed in Italy by 20th Century Fox on 27 July 1976. It was distributed in Paris on 6 July 1977 as L'autre cote de la violence.

== See also ==
- List of Italian films of 1976
