= Emanuelle in America =

1977 Italian sexploitation film

- Film poster
- Directed by: Joe D'Amato
- Screenplay by: Maria Pia Fusco
- Story by: Ottavio Alessi; Piero Vivarelli
- Starring: Laura Gemser; Gabriele Tinti; Roger Browne; Riccardo Salvino; Maria Piera Regoli; Matilde Dall'Aglio; Stefania Nocilli; Paola Senatore
- Cinematography: Aristide Massaccesi
- Edited by: Vincenzo Tomassi
- Music by: Nico Fidenco
- Production company: New Film Production
- Distributed by: Fida Cinematografica
- Release date: 5 January 1977 (Italy)
- Running time: 100 minutes
- Country: Italy
- Language: Italian

Emanuelle in America is a 1977 Italian sexploitation film, the third in the Black Emanuelle series starring Laura Gemser. It is the second in the series to be directed by Joe D'Amato and has journalist Emanuelle investigate the production of snuff films, among other things. In some cuts, which were only released in certain markets, the film contains scenes of hardcore pornography, graphic violence and bestiality.

== Plot ==
In a Manhattan studio, Emanuelle shoots a nude photo shoot. There, model Janet talks about her boyfriend Tony, a virgin philosopher who thinks sex is the root of all of modern society's evils. She complains that they do nothing but talk. In her car, Emanuelle gets hijacked by Tony, who threatens to kill her because of her sexual immorality. Emanuelle finds out about his sexual childhood trauma, argues for the cleanliness of sex, and starts to fellate him. Panic-stricken, Tony runs away.

At her apartment, Emanuelle's boyfriend Bill plays with Tony's gun while she prepares to leave for a meeting. Craving sex, he playfully threatens to commit suicide with the gun and gets Emanuelle to postpone and have sex with him.

Planning to investigate billionaire Van Darren, Emanuelle visits a boxing gymnasium, where Joe, a former fighter turned trainer after being replaced as Van Darren's bodyguard, provides her with false papers. Van Darren's harem consists of twelve zodiacal women, the only current opening being for a Virgo.

At Van Darren's villa, Emanuelle infiltrates the harem. At the pool, she joins two of the women for a lesbian underwater game. Investigating the stables, she finds a weapons stash labeled "horse shoes". A guest there, the Duke of Elba Alfredo Elvize, has a monogamous attitude, unlike his host. In the evening, everyone watches a woman give a hand job to a horse. Alone with Van Darren, Emanuelle ridicules him for his power-centered and money-centered approach to sex. In the game room, she beats him at poker dice, taking a lot of money from him. She flees in Elvize's car and is invited to his Venetian palazzo.

There, the duke catches his wife with another man, and in turn, sleeps with Emanuelle. When his wife joins them, Emanuelle leaves, happily reuniting the couple. Emanuelle's boyfriend Bill later pays her a visit, the couple have sex during a rehearsal of the Spring concerto. At a party in the mansion, Emanuelle learns of a Caribbean island resort which offers beautiful men to sex-starved women. She also discovers the duke's hidden stash of forged paintings. When a pop out cake is opened, the party turns into an orgy, and Emanuelle takes pictures.

Back at the Manhattan studio, Janet reveals that sex is all that Tony thinks of now. Alone again, Emanuelle has phone sex with Bill.

Emanuelle poses as a client to infiltrate the island resort. She takes pictures of the couples and their sexual role plays. One of the women watches an 8 mm snuff film during sex, which shocks Emanuelle. Her cover is blown when a male sex worker recognizes her from one of her journals. She escapes by seducing, drugging and raping the resort's lesbian director and getting into the cab of the chauffeur with whom she came. They have sex in the car.

The trail of the snuff film leads her to a US senator in Washington, whom Emanuelle seduces. Presenting himself as a conservative patriot, he invites her to his studio. There, she convinces him of showing her his snuff film collection. Enamored, the senator has sex with her and drugs her drink. Emanuelle goes into a drug trip in which she travels with him to South America and witnesses torture and rape with her own eyes. In the morning, she promises the senator to visit him again.

Emanuelle does not know if what she saw was real until her editor shows her pictures she took. Emanuelle sees it as the scoop of the century, but the editor tells her he has received orders from the top not to publish them. Angered, Emanuelle decides to take an indefinite break from her job.

Vacationing in an island with Bill, Emanuelle gets caught by a native tribe and is to become the local chieftain's twelfth wife. Bill confesses he has sold her for a shell necklace and beer. After the ceremony, a US film crew appears. The tribe are used as actors. Not wanting to take part in a film, Bill and Emanuelle elope, running along the beach in the sunset.

== Cast ==
- Laura Gemser as Emanuelle
- Gabriele Tinti as Alfredo Elvize, The Duke of Mont'Elba
- Roger Browne as The Senator
- Riccardo Salvino as Bill
- Lars Bloch as Eric Van Darren
- Paola Senatore as Laura Elvize
- Maria Piera Regoli as Diana Smith
- Lorraine De Selle as Gemini
- Marina Frajese as Woman At The Beach
- Giulio Bianchi as Tony
- Efrem Appel as Joe
- Matilde Dall'Aglio
- Carlo Foschi
- Maria Renata Franco
- Giulio Massimini
- Stefania Nocilli as Janet

== Background ==
Alternate scenes were shot back to back so that the film could be edited at a later date to accommodate the different markets where it would eventually be released. The result was confusion, with multiple versions with varying running times. The Dutch version omits the hardcore sex scenes, and the extreme violence. In Britain, the British Board of Film Classification, removed all the hardcore sex scenes, and the plot was trimmed to remove any reference to snuff films. In the United States, the offensive material and some hardcore content was edited out. In Canada, the Ontario Film Review Board used portions of the snuff material in order to justify the review board was necessary to censor objectionable content.

One of the actresses in the snuff scenes sued Joe D'Amato and members of the crew claiming the experience was too brutal and realistic, and that she had been traumatized. As a consequence of her legal action, "D'Amato's passport was confiscated for five years, meaning he could not leave Italy until he paid her compensation."

== Reception ==
Film critic Scott Stine wrote "from nude photography to white slavery, gun-running, to aristocratic debauchery to, well, snuff films, this film tries to cover all the bases; sex and skin is in abundance; sex is power, to be sure, but the credo is quite insincere, as the scriptwriter tries desperately to obscure the film's exploitive nature with feeble-minded rhetoric."

Author Derek Jones wrote "in its fullest, hard-core version, it is one of the few commercial feature films in which images of really horrendous sexual violence to women, images that carefully exploit the rhetoric of amateur and vérité filmmaking in order to persuade us that what we are watching is real, are presented not simply in a directly sexual context but as sexually arousing." Critic Erik Sulev opined that "starting off as goofy sexploitation, it eventually moves into the realms of graphic and exploitive horror; you really have to wonder what D’Amato was thinking when he put this movie together; when even the activities of Pedro the horse are overshadowed by the visceral footage, you know that you have something really unpleasant in your hands.

David Kerekes and David Slater wrote in Killing for Culture, that "in its uncut form, the movie steps beyond mere exploitation; the scene where our heroine first stumbles upon the mysterious snuff footage is on a par with any grotesque in D'Amoto's extensive cinematic canon; sequences that show victims being blow-torched, branded with irons, and beaten and strangled while gang-raped, play over the sounds of orgasm; it's off the wall even by D'Amoto's purient standards."

Film critic Michael Weldon said "this movie is so extreme that David Cronenberg was inspired by it to make Videodrome." He went on to state the "original 100-minute uncut version features Mondo and snuff footage (all incredible fakes), gore, hardcore sex, and horse masturbation." In his review for Rue Morgue, Aaron Lupton opined "sure you might be thinking that rolling hardcore pom, bestiality, and brutal images of torture would make for a pretty kick-ass exploitation film experience; but with no conventional film elements like plot or character development, the movie comes off as little more than an unremarkable ’70s porn film with some gruesome snuff film segments to add more notoriety to D’Amato’s sleazy filmography."

== See also ==
- List of Italian films of 1977

== Sources ==
- Jones, Derek (2015). Censorship: A World Encyclopedia. Routledge. ISBN 978-1-136-79863-4.
- Kerekes, David; Slater, David (3 June 2016). killing for culture: From Edison to ISIS: A New History of Death on Film. SCB Distributors. ISBN 978-1-909394-35-3.
- Lupton, Aaron (September–October 2003). "Cinemacabre: Emanuelle in America". Rue Morgue. No. 35. ISSN 1481-1103.
- Milligen, Stephen (2017). The Bloodiest Thing That Ever Happened In Front Of A Camera. SCB Distributors. ISBN 978-1-909394-09-4.
- Stine, Scott Aaron (2015). The Gorehound's Guide to Splatter Films of the 1960s and 1970s. McFarland & Company. ISBN 978-0-7864-9140-7.
- Sulev, Erik (1994). "My Baby Was Black Emanuelle". European Trash Cinema. Vol. 12, no. 10.
- Weldon, Michael (1996). The Psychotronic Video Guide To Film. Macmillan Publishers. ISBN 978-0-312-13149-4.
