= Pierino colpisce ancora =

- Italian theatrical release poster
- Directed by: Marino Girolami
- Written by: Gianfranco Clerici; Vincenzo Mannino
- Produced by: Filmes International
- Starring: Alvaro Vitali
- Cinematography: Federico Zanni
- Edited by: Alberto Moriani
- Music by: Berto Pisano
- Distributed by: Medusa Film
- Release date: 23 February 1982 (Italy)
- Running time: 90 min
- Country: Italy
- Language: Italian

Pierino colpisce ancora (also known as Desirable Teacher 2) is a 1982 comedy film directed by Marino Girolami.

== Plot ==
Rome: Pierino has again flunked the exams. Therefore, his desperate parents send him to boarding school in Grosseto.

== Cast ==
- Alvaro Vitali as Pierino
- Michela Miti as Substitute
- Sophia Lombardo as Teacher Mazzacurati
- Enzo Robutti as Teacher Pomari
- Enzo Liberti as Pierino's Father
- Riccardo Billi as Pierino's Grandfather
- Toni Ucci as Francesco
- Nicoletta Piersanti as Enrichetta
- Gianfranco Barra as Teacher
- Serena Grandi as Rosina
- Stefania Stella as Waitress

== Release ==
The film was released in Italy on 23 February 1982.
