= Michele Massimo Tarantini =

Italian film director (1942–2026)

- Born: 7 August 1942; Rome, Italy
- Died: 3 April 2026 (aged 83); Rio de Janeiro, Brazil
- Occupation: Film director

Michele Massimo Tarantini (7 August 1942 – 3 April 2026) was an Italian film director.

== Life and career ==
Born in Rome, at young age Tarantini was assumed by the production company Dania Cinematografica, for which he held various positions including secretary of production, set designer, film editor and assistant director for Sergio Martino, Giuliano Carnimeo, Nando Cicero and Mariano Laurenti.

Tarantini made his directorial debut in 1973 with a giallo-crime film, Seven Hours of Violence, but his first commercial success was the 1975 sexy comedy La liceale, which launched the career of Gloria Guida. After then, Tarantini became one of the prominent and most successful directors in the commedia sexy all'italiana film genre.

In 1983 Tarantini moved to Brazil, where he kept directing low-budget genre films, often under the stage name Michael E. Lemick. His last film was the 2001 comedy Se lo fai sono guai.

Tarantini died in Rio de Janeiro on 3 April 2026, at the age of 83.

== Selected filmography ==
- Seven Hours of Violence (1973)
- Teasers (1975)
- La professoressa di scienze naturali (1976)
- Confessions of a Lady Cop (1976)
- Crimebusters (1976)
- Taxi Girl (1977)
- A Man Called Magnum (1977)
- The School Teacher in the House (1978)
- La dottoressa ci sta col colonnello (1980)
- L'insegnante al mare con tutta la classe (1980)
- La moglie in bianco... l'amante al pepe (1980)
- La dottoressa preferisce i marinai (1981)
- L'assistente sociale tutto pepe (1981)
- A Policewoman in New York (1981)
- Giovani, belle... probabilmente ricche (1982)
- The Sword of the Barbarians (1983)
- Massacre in Dinosaur Valley (1985)
