= Alvaro Vitali =

Italian actor (1950–2025)

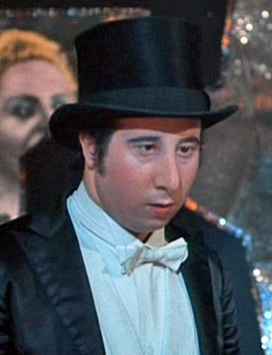
- Vitali in Federico Fellini's film Roma (1972)
- Born: 3 February 1950; Rome, Italy
- Died: 24 June 2025 (aged 75); Rome, Italy
- Occupation: Actor
- Years active: 1969–2025
- Spouse: Stefania Corona (m. 2006)
- Children: 1

Alvaro Vitali (Italian: [alˈvaːro viˈtaːli]; 3 February 1950 – 24 June 2025) was an Italian actor and comedian.

== Life and career ==
Born in Rome, Vitali was the son of a small construction company owner and a Titanus studio worker. He left high school to work as an electrician. Spotted by Federico Fellini during an audition, he made his film debut with a small part in Satyricon (1969), before taking on increasingly more prominent roles in subsequent Fellini films such as The Clowns, Roma, and Amarcord.

In the 1970s, Vitali became one of the major stars in the commedia sexy all'italiana genre. In the early 1980s, starting from Pierino contro tutti, he had a personal success in a series of films featuring Pierino, a Little John variation. During the same decade, his success began to decline, and opportunities to work became increasingly scarce. In the 2000s his career was briefly relaunched by the Canale 5 satirical show Striscia la notizia, where he portrayed a comic version of Jean Todt and other humorous characters. In 2006, he took part in the reality show La fattoria, the Italian version of The Farm, retiring soon after because of his asthma.

Vitali's style was characterized by "exaggerated facial expressions, strong physicality, and slapstick-style comic timing". He has been described as "probably one of the most underrated [Italian] film actors, deserving renewed recognition".

=== Personal life and death ===
Vitali was married twice and had a son, Ennio, from his first marriage. He considered himself Roman Catholic.

On 24 June 2025, Vitali died in Rome from a recurrent bronchopneumonia, for which he had been hospitalized two weeks earlier. He was 75.

== Selected filmography ==
- Satyricon (1969) .... Blue-Faced 'Emperor' on Stage (uncredited)
- The Clowns (1970, TV Movie) .... Himself
- Roma (1972) .... Alvaro - Tap Dancer at Teatrino (uncredited)
- Meo Patacca (1972) .... Bit Part (uncredited)
- What? (1972) .... Cross-Eyed Painter
- Halleluja to Vera Cruz (1973)
- Dirty Weekend (1973) .... Member of Camera Team (uncredited)
- Even Angels Eat Beans (1973) .... Tailor Assistant (uncredited)
- La Tosca (1973) .... Un derelitto
- Polvere di stelle (1973) .... (uncredited)
- Amarcord (1973) .... Naso
- Rugantino (1973) .... Beggar (uncredited)
- L'arbitro (1974) .... Il postino (uncredited)
- 4 marmittoni alle grandi manovre (1974) .... Soldato Viola (uncredited)
- Il colonnello Buttiglione diventa generale (1974) .... Infermiere (uncredited)
- Come Home and Meet My Wife (1974) .... Paolo, conoscente di Giulio e Vincenzina
- Policewoman (1974) .... Fantuzzi
- Scent of a Woman (1974) .... Vittorio
- Sex Pot (1975) .... Taxi Driver
- The School Teacher (1975) .... Tatuzzo
- Vergine, e di nome Maria (1975) .... Rocco
- Due cuori, una cappella (1975) .... Tassista strabico
- La liceale (1975) .... Petruccio Sciacca
- Frankenstein all'italiana (1975)
- Season for Assassins (1975)
- La dottoressa sotto il lenzuolo (1976) .... Alvaro
- The Career of a Chambermaid (1976) .... The Son in the Brothel (uncredited)
- Confessions of a Lady Cop (1976) .... Tarallo
- Live Like a Cop, Die Like a Man (1976) .... Concierge at Pasquini's building
- La professoressa di scienze naturali (1976) .... Peppino Cariglia
- Classe mista (1976) .... Angelino Zampanò
- My Father's Private Secretary (1976) .... Oscar
- Sex with a Smile II (1976) .... Broccolini, Aka Xx2 (Segment "Il Detective")
- The Lady Medic (1976) .... Alvaro Pappalardo
- The Virgo, the Taurus and the Capricorn (1977) .... Alvaro
- Taxi Girl (1977) .... Alvaro
- Per amore di Poppea (1977, directed by Mariano Laurenti) .... Caio
- La compagna di banco (1977) .... Salvatore
- The Nurse on a Military Tour (1977) .... Alvaro Quattromani
- The Schoolteacher Goes to Boys' High (1978) .... Armandino Fusecchia
- La liceale nella classe dei ripetenti (1978) .... Professor Modesti
- The School Teacher in the House (1978) .... Ottavio - Amedeo's son
- The Soldier with Great Maneuvers (1978) .... Alvaro
- Scherzi da prete (1978) .... Alvaro (uncredited)
- Night Nurse (1979) .... Peppino
- L'insegnante balla... con tutta la classe (1979) .... Anacleto Petruccio
- Where Can You Go Without the Little Vice? (1979) .... Aroldo / Carlotta Angulo / Gigetto
- How to Seduce Your Teacher (1979) .... Salvatore Pinzarrone
- A Policewoman on the Porno Squad (1979) .... Appuntato Tarallo
- The Nurse in the Military Madhouse (1979) .... Peppino
- Cocco mio (Gros câlin, 1979) .... Brancardier
- La liceale, il diavolo e l'acquasanta (1979) .... Carmelo Petralia
- L'insegnante al mare con tutta la classe (1980) .... Cocò
- La ripetente fa l'occhietto al preside (1980) .... Beccafico
- La liceale al mare con l'amica di papà (also known as La liceale al mare con tutta la classe, 1980) .... Terenzio
- La dottoressa ci sta col colonnello (1980) .... Arturo Mazzancolla
- L'onorevole con l'amante sotto il letto (1981) .... Teo Mezzabotta
- Pierino contro tutti (1981) .... Pierino
- A Policewoman in New York (1981) .... Alvaro Tarallo / Joe Dodiciomicidi
- Pierino medico della Saub (1981) .... Alvaro Gasperoni / Pippetto
- La dottoressa preferisce i marinai (1981) .... Alvaro
- Pierino colpisce ancora (1982) .... Pierino
- Giggi il bullo (1982) .... Giggi il bullo
- Gianburrasca (1982) .... Giannino Stoppani / Gian Burrasca
- Paulo Roberto Cotechiño centravanti di sfondamento (1983) .... Paulo Roberto Cotechiño / Idraulico
- Il tifoso, l'arbitro e il calciatore (1984) .... Alvaro Presutti
- Zanzibar (1986, Episode: "La vedova") .... Lino
- Mortacci (1989) .... Torquato
- Pierino torna a scuola (1990) .... Pierino
- Club Vacanze (1995) .... Alvaro / Pierino
- Se lo fai sono guai (2001)
- Ladri di barzelette (2004)
- Impotenti esistenziali (2009)
- Vacanze a gallipoli (2011)
- È il cancro il mio amante (2012)
- Tutti a Ostia Beach - Il film (2013)
- Effetti indesiderati (2015)
- Supposte (2016)
- Mò vi mento - Lira di Achille (2018)
- Buon lavoro (2018)
- Vivi la vita (2019)
- GG Turbo (2020)
- Gli imprevisti (2024)
- Vita da Carlo (2025) – TV series
