= La liceale =

1975 Italian film

- Directed by: Michele Massimo Tarantini
- Written by: Francesco Milizia; Marino Onorati
- Produced by: Luciano Martino
- Starring: Gloria Guida; Giuseppe Pambieri
- Cinematography: Giancarlo Ferrando
- Edited by: Raimondo Crociani
- Music by: Victorio Pezzolla
- Distributed by: Inter Record Cinematografica
- Release date: 1975
- Running time: 90 minutes
- Country: Italy
- Language: Italian
- Box office: $2.2 million

La liceale (internationally released as The Teasers, Under-Graduate Girls and Sophomore Swingers) is a 1975 commedia sexy all'italiana directed by Michele Massimo Tarantini. The film is considered the real breakout title for Gloria Guida and generated a "Liceale" film-series which consists of five titles, four of them starring Gloria Guida. It was followed by La liceale nella classe dei ripetenti.

== Plot ==
Loredana d'Amico is a restless teenager, who has the advantage of being very beautiful. Her parents do not understand her, and she does not understand them, judging them immature and not authoritarian. While Loredana's father has flings with PYTs, her mother is in a physical relationship with another man. Loredana, since she has bad grades, likes to seduce the teachers of high school to have good results. She helps the classmates out by seducing the professors when they are in trouble.

One day, her classmate, who is also a budding artist, invites her home to paint a naked portrait of her, but when he sees her undressed, he gets aroused and wants to take advantage. She hits him on the head and he faints as she leaves for home in disgust. One day a new student Gianni comes to her class. He has curly hair and has lived in America (the USA) since his father used to work there. She is instantly attracted to him and him to her.

After a brief fling, they go to the outskirts and enjoy skinny dipping near a waterfall. They kiss passionately and are about to take it to the next step when she suddenly leaves as she thinks "men want only one thing". Gianni gets angry that she led him on and then did nothing. He rides off on his bike alone, leaving her in the wild. Loredana takes a lift to get home to Rome. All this while, Loredana is also in constant touch with another close friend, who, formerly unbeknownst to her, has acquired wealth via a "profession of ill-repute". To make Gianni jealous, Loredana openly flirts with the new professor. He gets angry and attacks the professor at night with his friends' support. The professor fights them off quite ably and is able to recognise Gianni from his class. Later Gianni and the professor are both angry at each other and the professor, being a mature adult, explains to Gianni that Loredana had duped both of them.

Loredana meets an associate of her father's, and engineer from Turin named Silvi and is charmed by his personality and gentlemanly appearance. He doesn't speak much, from which she infers that he wasn't married or else he would have talked about his wife and his family. She confesses to her friend Lucia that he is a very different man, one who treats her with respect and not one to jump to the physical stuff. Some time later, with mutual consent Loredana and Silvi have intercourse. Loredana is saddened and in pain because now she has been deflowered. Silvi tells her he would have preferred her to be a non-virgin and had she told him she was a virgin, he would have been gentle; but not that he didn't like what they did.

After his work in Turin is done, Silvi says that he is returning home soon. Loredana expresses a desire to run away with him. He is silent, obviously not wanting this. On the day he is to leave, a jealous Gianni follows him with the aim of beating him up and his bike gets into an accident. Meanwhile, Loredana is given a letter by the hotel where Silvi was staying, stating that their love should be only a beautiful memory and the reason why he cannot take her will be clear to her when she grows up. Heartbroken, she returns to meet Lucia. All this while, her divorced parents are out looking for her in worry. They come to know that she had planned to run away to Turin for a man, from which Loredana's father Signor d'Amico infers that it must be Silvi; but dismisses the idea as he knows Silvi is happily married.

She confesses to Lucia that all men are the same and she does not want to believe in love any more. Lucia says that Gianni truly loved her. At this moment, the artist friend from school shows up and informs them of the accident. They rush to meet Gianni in the hospital. Loredana is truly sad to see his state, but he calls her a bitch and wards her off as she had caused him so much physical and emotional trouble. Silently, she goes away to meet her friend who was in the profession of carnal pleasure. She laments to her that all men she met have duped her under pretense of love. She expresses a desire to have a paid physical relation with a client of hers. He arrives but she backs out at the last moment, realising her mistake.

At home, she finds her mother's lover waiting outside for her mother. He says that her mother loves him for him and if he were a stronger man, she may not love him any more; because then he would have become a changed man, not the one she loved to begin with. In short, he explains that one should always be oneself and stop pretending - stop lying to yourself and the world. Loredana realises that she was trying to grow up too fast and there is more to life than infatuation and sex. When her parents arrive, she says that all is fine now, but it would be better if they were to become a couple again. While they do not accept, they do agree (after she leaves) that she is now becoming mature and she has a point.

Loredana tries to seduce the professor again but when she sees Gianni, she realises her true feelings (being oneself) and renews their relationship. The professor is left confused while the artist friend is ravaged by Lucia in the bushes as the credits roll.

== Cast ==
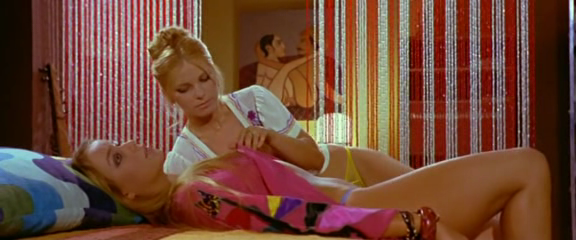
Scene featuring Gloria Guida and Ilona Staller

- Gloria Guida as Loredana D'Amico
- Giuseppe Pambieri as Dr. Marco Salvi
- Gianfranco D'Angelo as Prof. Guidi
- Renzo Marignano as Prof. Mancinelli
- Rodolfo Bigotti as Gianni Montrone
- Alvaro Vitali as Petruccio Sciacca
- Gisella Sofio as Elvira D'Amico
- Mario Carotenuto as Comm. D'Amico
- Enzo Cannavale as Osvaldo
- Ilona Staller as Monica
- Franco Diogene as Monica's lover
