= List of Italian films of 1980 =

This is a list of Italian films that premiered or were originally released in 1980 (see 1980 in film).

Italian films released in 1980
Title	Director	Cast	Genre	Notes
3 Supermen Against the Godfather			Comedy science fiction	
Action	Tinto Brass	Luc Merenda, Adriana Asti	—N/a	
Alien 2: On Earth	Ciro Ippolito	Belinda Mayne, Mark Bodin, Robert Barrese	Science fiction, horror	
Antropophagus	Joe D'Amato	Tisa Farrow, George Eastman	Horror	
Arrivano i bersaglieri	Luigi Magni	Ugo Tognazzi, Giovanna Ralli, Pippo Franco	Comedy	
Il Bisbetico Domato	Castellano & Pipolo	Adriano Celentano, Ornella Muti, Edith Peters	Comedy, romance	
Blow Job (Soffio erotico)	Alberto Cavallone	Danilo Micheli, Anna Massarelli, Anna Bruna Cazzato	—N/a	
The Blue-Eyed Bandit	Alfredo Giannetti	Franco Nero	Crime	
Café Express	Nanni Loy	Nino Manfredi, Adolfo Celi, Vittorio Caprioli	Comedy, crime	
Cannibal Apocalypse	Antonio Margheriti	John Saxon, Elizabeth Turner, Giovanni Lombardo Radice	Horror	Italian-Spanish co-production
Cannibal Holocaust	Ruggero Deodato	Robert Kerman, Francesca Ciardi, Perry Pirkanen	Horror	
Catherine and I	Alberto Sordi	Alberto Sordi, Edwige Fenech, Catherine Spaak	comedy	
Ciao marziano	Pier Francesco Pingitore	Pippo Franco, Silvia Dionisio	Science fiction, comedy	
City of the Living Dead	Lucio Fulci	Christopher George, Catriona MacColl, Carlo De Mejo	Horror	
City of Women	Federico Fellini	Marcello Mastroianni	Fantasy	Italian-French co-production
Contamination	Luigi Cozzi	Ian McCulloch, Louise Marleau, Marino Masé	Horror, science fiction	Italian-West German co-production
Contraband	Lucio Fulci	Fabio Testi, Ivana Monti, Marcel Bozzuffi	Crime	
The Cricket	Alberto Lattuada	Virna Lisi, Anthony Franciosa	Drama	
Day of the Cobra	Enzo G. Castellari	Franco Nero, Sybil Danning	Crime	
La dottoressa ci sta col colonnello	Michele Massimo Tarantini	Lino Banfi, Nadia Cassini, Alvaro Vitali	Commedia sexy all'italiana	
Eaten Alive!	Umberto Lenzi	Robert Kerman, Janet Agren, Ivan Rassimov	Horror	
Erotic Nights of the Living Dead	Joe D'Amato	Laura Gemser, George Eastman	erotic-horror	
Everything Happens to Me	Michele Lupo	Bud Spencer, Cary Guffey	Comedy	
Fantozzi contro tutti	Neri Parenti , Paolo Villaggio	Paolo Villaggio, Milena Vukotic	Comedy	
Fico d'India	Steno	Renato Pozzetto, Aldo Maccione, Gloria Guida	Comedy	
Flatfoot in Egypt	Steno	Bud Spencer, Robert Loggia	crime-comedy	
Fontamara	Carlo Lizzani	Michele Placido, Ida Di Benedetto	drama	
Fun Is Beautiful	Carlo Verdone	Carlo Verdone, Mario Brega, Renato Scarpa	Comedy	Won a Special David di Donatello Award and a Nastro d'Argento Award for Best New Actor.
The Garden of Eden	Yasuzô Masumura	Ronni Valente, Leonora Fani, Antonella Lualdi, Massimo Rinaldi, Guido Mannari, Angela Goodwin, Giorgio Valente, Loris Zanchi, Massimo Seranto	Comedy, Drama, Romance	Italian-Japanese co-production
Hell of the Living Dead	Bruno Mattei	Margit Evelyn Newton	Horror	
The House on the Edge of the Park	Ruggero Deodato	David Hess, Annie Belle, Giovanni Lombardo Radice	Horror	
I Hate Blondes	Giorgio Capitani	Enrico Montesano, Jean Rochefort, Corinne Cléry	comedy	
I Made a Splash	Maurizio Nichetti	Maurizio Nichetti, Angela Finocchiaro	comedy	
I'm Getting a Yacht	Sergio Corbucci	Johnny Dorelli, Laura Antonelli	comedy	
I'm Photogenic	Dino Risi	Renato Pozzetto, Edwige Fenech, Aldo Maccione	comedy	Entered into the 1980 Cannes Film Festival
Immacolata and Concetta: The Other Jealousy	Salvatore Piscicelli	Ida Di Benedetto	romance drama	
Inferno	Dario Argento	Irene Miracle, Leigh McCloskey, Daria Nicolodi	Horror	
L'insegnante al mare con tutta la classe	Michele Massimo Tarantini	Lino Banfi, Anna Maria Rizzoli, Alvaro Vitali	Commedia sexy all'italiana	
In the Pope's Eye	Renzo Arbore	Renzo Arbore, Roberto Benigni, Isabella Rossellini	Comedy	
Il ladrone	Marco Bellocchio	Enrico Montesano, Edwige Fenech, Bernadette Lafont	comedy	
A Leap in the Dark	Marco Bellocchio	Michel Piccoli, Anouk Aimée, Michele Placido	Drama	
La liceale al mare con l'amica di papà	Marino Girolami	Marisa Mell, Renzo Montagnani, Alvaro Vitali	Commedia sexy all'italiana	
La locandiera	Paolo Cavara	Adriano Celentano, Paolo Villaggio, Claudia Mori	comedy	
Love in First Class	Salvatore Samperi	Enrico Montesano, Sylvia Kristel, Franca Valeri	comedy	
Il lupo e l'agnello	Francesco Massaro	Tomas Milian, Michel Serrault	comedy	
Macabre	Lamberto Bava	Stanko Molnar	Horror	
Madness	Fernando Di Leo	Joe Dallesandro	Crime	
Il medium	Silvio Amadio	Vincent Mannari Jr., Sherry Buchanan, Stefano Mastrogirolamo	Drama	
Men or Not Men	Valentino Orsini	Flavio Bucci, Monica Guerritore	Drama	
Mia moglie è una strega	Castellano & Pipolo	Renato Pozzetto, Eleonora Giorgi	Comedy	
La moglie in bianco... l'amante al pepe	Michele Massimo Tarantini	Lino Banfi, Pamela Prati	Commedia sexy all'italiana	
La moglie in vacanza... l'amante in città	Michele Massimo Tarantini	Lino Banfi, Edwige Fenech, Barbara Bouchet	Commedia sexy all'italiana	
The Mystery of Oberwald	Michelangelo Antonioni	Monica Vitti, Franco Branciaroli, Paolo Bonacelli	Drama	
Nightmare City	Umberto Lenzi	Hugo Stiglitz, Francisco Rabal, Mel Ferrer	Horror	
Oggetti smarriti	Giuseppe Bertolucci	Mariangela Melato, Bruno Ganz, Renato Salvatori	Comedy drama	
Ombre	Giorgio Cavedon	Lou Castel, Monica Guerritori, Laura Belli	—N/a	
La pagella	Ninì Grassia	Mario Trevi, Marc Porel	Drama	
Patrick Still Lives	Mario Landi	Sacha Pitoëff, Mariangela Giordano	Horror	
The Precarious Bank Teller	Luciano Salce	Paolo Villaggio, Catherine Spaak, Anna Maria Rizzoli	Comedy	
The Pumaman	Alberto De Martino	Donald Pleasence, Sydne Rome	superhero	
Qua la mano	Pasquale Festa Campanile	Enrico Montesano, Adriano Celentano, Lilli Carati	comedy	
The Rebel	Umberto Lenzi	Maurizio Merli, Jutta Speidel	poliziottesco	
La ripetente fa l'occhietto al preside	Mariano Laurenti	Lino Banfi, Anna Maria Rizzoli, Alvaro Vitali	Commedia sexy all'italiana	
La settimana bianca	Mariano Laurenti	Anna Maria Rizzoli, Gianfranco D'Angelo	Commedia sexy all'italiana	
Si salvi chi vuole	Roberto Faenza	Gastone Moschin, Claudia Cardinale	Comedy drama	
Speed Cross	Stelvio Massi	Fabio Testi, Vittorio Mezzogiorno, Daniela Poggi	crime-action	
Super Fuzz	Sergio Corbucci	Terence Hill, Ernest Borgnine, Joanne Dru	—N/a	
Sugar, Honey and Pepper	Sergio Martino	Lino Banfi, Edwige Fenech, Renato Pozzetto	comedy	
La terrazza	Ettore Scola	Marcello Mastroianni, Ugo Tognazzi, Vittorio Gassman	Drama	Best Screenplay and Best Supporting Actress (Carla Gravina) awards at the Cannes Film Festival. 2 Nastro d'Argento Awards
To Love the Damned	Marco Tullio Giordana	Flavio Bucci	drama	Entered into the 1980 Cannes Film Festival
Savage Breed	Pasquale Squitieri	Saverio Marconi, Stefano Madia, Enzo Cannavale	drama	Entered into the 12th Moscow International Film Festival
Voltati Eugenio	Luigi Comencini	Dalila Di Lazzaro, Saverio Marconi, Bernard Blier	Comedy drama	
Zappatore	Alfonso Brescia	Mario Merola, Regina Bianchi	drama	

== Footnotes ==
=== References ===
- Curti, Roberto (2013). Italian Crime Filmography, 1968-1980. McFarland. ISBN 978-0786469765.
- Curti, Roberto (2019). Italian Gothic Horror Films, 1980-1989. McFarland. ISBN 978-1476672434.
- Shipka, Danny. Perverse Titillation: The Exploitation Cinema of Italy, Spain and France, 1960-1980. McFarland, 2011. ISBN 0786448881.
- Curti, Roberto (2016). Diabolika: Supercriminals, Superheroes and the Comic Book Universe in Italian Cinema. Midnight Marquee Press. ISBN 978-1-936168-60-6.
