= Jimmy il Fenomeno =

Italian actor (1932–2018)

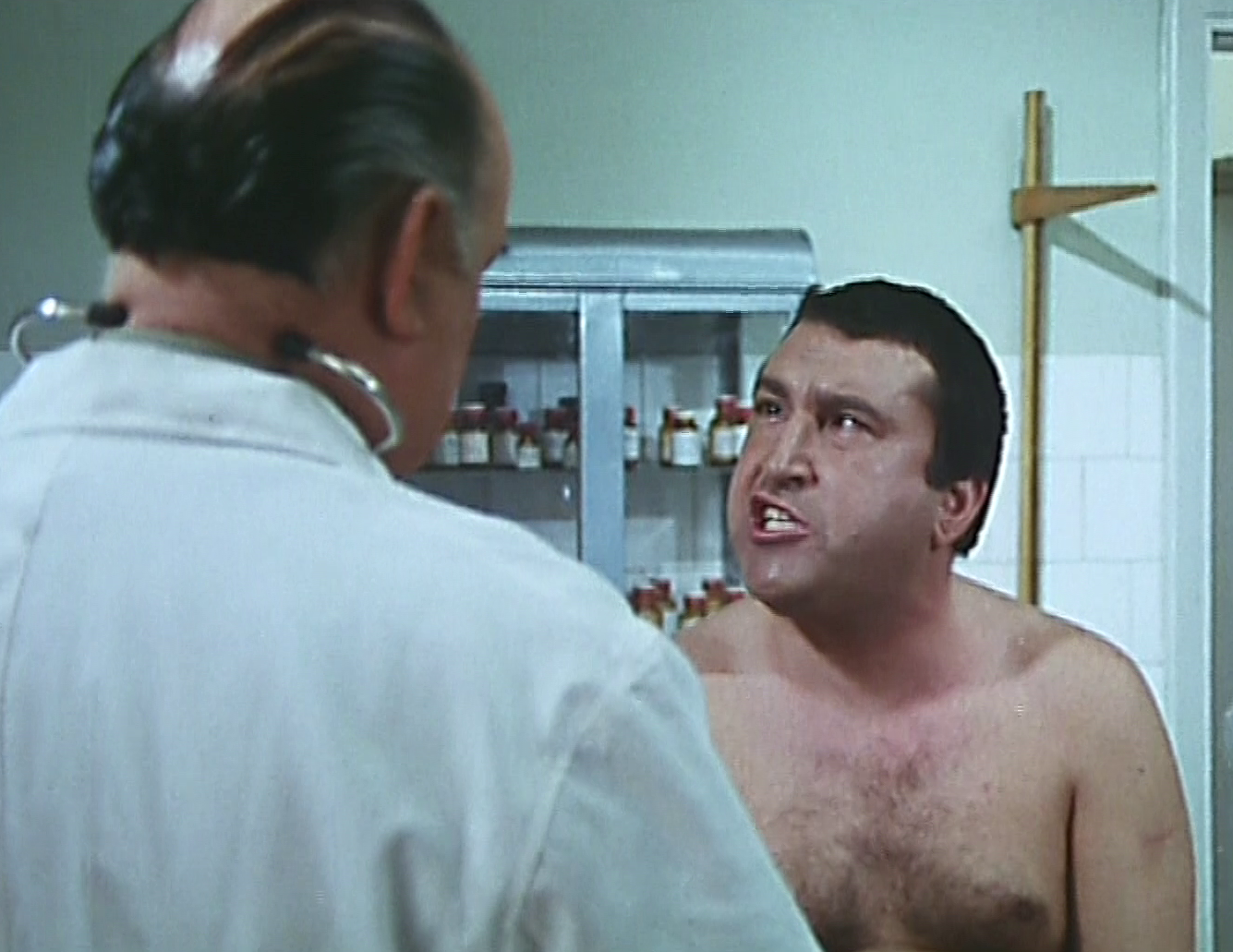
- Jimmy il Fenomeno in Donne... botte e bersaglieri (1968)
- Born: Luigi Origene Soffrano; 22 April 1932; Lucera, Italy
- Died: 6 August 2018 (aged 86); Milan, Italy
- Occupations: Actor; comedian
- Years active: 1957–2003

Luigi Origene Soffrano, better known by his stage name Jimmy il Fenomeno (22 April 1932 – 6 August 2018) was an Italian actor who played supporting roles within the Italian cinema.

== Biography ==
Born in Lucera, Jimmy il Fenomeno began his acting career in 1957 starring in the film Legs of Gold starring Totò which was released a year later. He landed the role after an audition with the film production company Titanus. An actor spanning nearly 50 years, Jimmy il Fenomeno participated in over 150 films usually playing minor or supporting roles in a commedia sexy all'italiana. He suffered from strabismus, which contributed greatly to his comedic roles as well as his odd laugh exposure.

In the 1980s, Jimmy il Fenomeno explored a career in television, He appeared in the successful Italian television program Drive In directed by Giancarlo Nicotra and Beppe Ricchia. By the 1990s, there was a decline in his career due to serious health issues. He eventually needed to use a wheelchair. In 2003, Jimmy il Fenomeno retired and settled into an elderly home.

In several of his films. Jimmy il Fenomeno's voice was dubbed by voice artists such as Piero Tiberi, Franco Latini, Ferruccio Amendola and Enzo Garinei. Jimmy il Fenomeno's name in English translates to "Jimmy the Phenomenon".

== Death ==
Jimmy il Fenomeno died on August 6, 2018, in his home in Milan as a result of his depleting health. He was 86 years old. He was buried in a cemetery within the district of Chiaravalle.

== Filmography ==
=== Cinema ===
- Legs of Gold (1958)
- The Fascist (1961)
- Hercules and the Conquest of Atlantis (1961)
- Day by Day, Desperately (1961)
- His Women (1961)
- Crazy Desire (1962)
- A Girl... and a Million (1962)
- The Changing of the Guard (1962)
- The Monk of Monza (1963)
- Messalina vs. the Son of Hercules (1964)
- I figli del leopardo (1965)
- Lola Colt (1967)
- Cuore matto... matto da legare (1967)
- Ten Thousand Dollars for a Massacre (1967)
- Be Sick... It's Free (1968)
- A Black Veil for Lisa (1968)
- The Longest Hunt (1968)
- Dismissed on His Wedding Night (1968)
- I See Naked (1969)
- Poppea's Hot Nights (1969)
- The Last Italian Tango (1973)
- Italian Graffiti (1973)
- Ku-Fu? Dalla Sicilia con furore (1973)
- Hospitals: The White Mafia (1973)
- Paolo il freddo (1974)
- The Big Snail (1974)
- Alla mia cara mamma nel giorno del suo compleanno (1974)
- The Exorcist: Italian Style (1975)
- The Noonday Executioner (1975)
- Loaded Guns (1975)
- Fantozzi (1975)
- Confessions of a Lady Cop (1976)
- The Lady Medic (1976)
- Scandal in the Family (1976)
- Swindle (1977)
- Destruction Force (1977)
- Double Murder (1977)
- Brothers Till We Die (1977)
- The Criminals Attack, The Police Respond! (1977)
- Le braghe del padrone (1978)
- The Schoolteacher Goes to Boys' High (1978)
- La liceale nella classe dei ripetenti (1978)
- The School Teacher in the House (1978)
- Liquorice (1979)
- Where Can You Go Without the Little Vice? (1979)
- Assassination on the Tiber (1979)
- Night Nurse (1979)
- How to Seduce Your Teacher (1979)
- A Policewoman on the Porno Squad (1979)
- Pardon Me, Are You Normal? (1979)
- The Nurse in the Military Madhouse (1979)
- I'm Photogenic (1980)
- L'insegnante al mare con tutta la classe (1980)
- La ripetente fa l'occhietto al preside (1980)
- Girls Will Be Girls (1980)
- Crime at Porta Romana (1980)
- Prickly Pears (1980)
- My Wife is a Witch (1980)
- The Taming of the Scoundrel (1980)
- Mia moglie torna a scuola (1981)
- L'onorevole con l'amante sotto il letto (1981)
- I carabbimatti (1981)
- I fichissimi (1981)
- Madly in Love (1981)
- Bomber (1982)
- Viuuulentemente mia (1982)
- Vieni avanti cretino (1982)
- Giovani, belle... probabilmente ricche (1982)
- W la foca (1982)
- Eccezzziunale... veramente (1982)
- Attila flagello di Dio (1982)
- Acqua e sapone (1983)
- Time for Loving 2 - One Year Later (1983)
- The Country Boy (1984)
- Hearts in the Storm (1984)
- To Love a Little (1984)
- Holidays in America (1984)
- Il ragazzo del Pony Express (1986)
- Superfantozzi (1986)
- Bellifreschi (1987)
- Rimini Rimini - Un anno dopo (1988)
- The Invisible Wall (1991)
- Vacanze di Natale '91 (1991)
- Fantozzi in Heaven (1993)
