= List of Italian films of 1979 =

A list of films produced in Italy in 1979 (see 1979 in film):

Title	Director	Cast	Genre	Notes
Gli anni struggenti	Vittorio Sindoni	Gabriele Ferzetti	comedy	
Assassinio sul Tevere	Bruno Corbucci	Tomas Milian, Marina Ripa Di Meana	poliziottesco-comedy	
Beyond the Darkness	Joe D'Amato	Kieran Canter, Cinzia Monreale, Franca Stoppi	Horror	
Caligula	Tinto Brass, Bob Guccione	Malcolm McDowell, John Gielgud, Peter O'Toole	Adult, Drama, History	
Christ Stopped at Eboli	Elio Petri	Gian Maria Volonté, Lea Massari, Paolo Bonacelli, Alain Cuny, Irene Papas	Political drama	Golden Prize at Moscow, David di Donatello for Best Film, BAFTA Award for Best Film
Cindy's Love Games	Aldo Grimaldi	Cindy Leadbetter	Commedia sexy all'italiana	
Il corpo della ragassa	Pasquale Festa Campanile	Lilli Carati, Enrico Maria Salerno	Commedia sexy all'italiana	
A Dangerous Toy	Giuliano Montaldo	Nino Manfredi, Marlène Jobert, Vittorio Mezzogiorno	crime drama	
Dear Father	Dino Risi	Vittorio Gassman, Andrée Lachapelle, Aurore Clément	drama	Entered into the 1979 Cannes Film Festival
Dedicated to the Aegean Sea	Masuo Ikeda	Ilona Staller, Stefania Casini, Olga Karlatos	Drama, Romance	Italian-Japanese co-production
Don Giovanni	Joseph Losey	Ruggero Raimondi, John Macurdy, Kiri Te Kanawa	Opera	
Don't Trust the Mafia	Mario Bianchi	Gabriele Tinti, Paola Senatore, Pino Mauro	Crime	
Un dramma borghese	Florestano Vancini	Franco Nero, Dalila Di Lazzaro	drama	
Dr. Jekyll Likes Them Hot	Steno	Paolo Villaggio, Edwige Fenech	Comedy	
Encounters in the Deep	Italo Zingarelli	Andrés García, Gianni Garko, Gabriele Ferzetti	science fiction	
Ernesto	Salvatore Samperi	Virna Lisi, Michele Placido, Turi Ferro	drama	Entered into the 29th Berlin International Film Festival
The Finzi Detective Agency	Bruno Corbucci	Renato Pozzetto, Enzo Cannavale	crime-comedy	
From Corleone to Brooklyn	Umberto Lenzi	Maurizio Merli, Mario Merola, Laura Belli	Crime	
From Hell to Victory	Umberto Lenzi	George Peppard, George Hamilton, Horst Buchholz	war	
From the Clouds to the Resistance	Straub–Huillet	Olimpia Carlisi	drama	
The Gang That Sold America	Bruno Corbucci	Tomas Milian, Asha Puthli	poliziottesco-comedy	
Gardenia	Domenico Paolella	Franco Califano, Martin Balsam, Robert Webber	—N/a	
Giallo a Venezia	Mario Landi	Leonora Fani	giallo	
The Great Alligator River	Sergio Martino	Barbara Bach, Claudio Cassinelli, Mel Ferrer	Horror	
Happy Hobos	Sergio Citti	Vittorio Gassman, Philippe Noiret, Gigi Proietti	comedy	
Hot Potato	Steno	Renato Pozzetto, Edwige Fenech	comedy	
The House by the Edge of the Lake	Enzo G. Castellari	Vincent Gardenia, Leonora Fani, Wolfango Soldati	horror	
How to Seduce Your Teacher	Mariano Laurenti	Lino Banfi, Gloria Guida, Alvaro Vitali	Commedia sexy all'italiana	
Hunted City	Stelvio Massi	Maurizio Merli, Mario Merola	poliziottesco	
Hurricane Rosy	Mario Monicelli	Gérard Depardieu, Faith Minton	sport comedy	
Images in a Convent	Joe D'Amato	Paola Senatore, Marina Hedman	sexploitation	
L'imbranato	Pier Francesco Pingitore	Pippo Franco, Laura Troschel	comedy	
I'm for the Hippopotamus	Tonino Ricci	Terence Hill, Bud Spencer	adventure-comedy	
L'insegnante balla... con tutta la classe	Giuliano Carnimeo	Lino Banfi, Nadia Cassini, Alvaro Vitali	Commedia sexy all'italiana	
Island of the Fishmen	Sergio Martino	Claudio Cassinelli, Barbara Bach, Richard Johnson, Joseph Cotten	adventure-fantasy	
La liceale, il diavolo e l'acquasanta	Nando Cicero	Lino Banfi, Gloria Guida, Alvaro Vitali	Commedia sexy all'italiana	
Life Is Beautiful	Grigory Chukhray	Giancarlo Giannini, Ornella Muti	Drama	
Lobster for Breakfast	Giorgio Capitani	Enrico Montesano, Claude Brasseur	comedy	
Lovers and Liars (Viaggio con Anita)	Mario Monicelli	Goldie Hawn, Giancarlo Giannini	Romantic comedy	
La luna	Bernardo Bertolucci	Jill Clayburgh, Matthew Barry, Renato Salvatori, Alida Valli, Tomas Milian, Franco Citti, Roberto Benigni	Drama	
Malabimba – The Malicious Whore	Andrea Bianchi		—N/a	
Il malato immaginario	Tonino Cervi	Alberto Sordi, Laura Antonelli, Bernard Blier, Giuliana De Sio	comedy	
A Man on His Knees	Damiano Damiani	Giuliano Gemma, Michele Placido, Eleonora Giorgi	crime-drama	
The Meadow	Paolo and Vittorio Taviani	Michele Placido, Saverio Marconi, Isabella Rossellini	drama	
Neapolitan Mystery	Sergio Corbucci	Marcello Mastroianni, Ornella Muti, Renato Pozzetto, Michel Piccoli	Giallo comedy	
Night Nurse	Nando Cicero	Lino Banfi, Gloria Guida, Alvaro Vitali	Commedia sexy all'italiana	
The Nurse in the Military Madhouse	Mariano Laurenti	Nadia Cassini, Lino Banfi, Alvaro Vitali	Commedia sexy all'italiana	
Ogro	Gillo Pontecorvo	Gian Maria Volonté, José Sacristán, Eusebio Poncela, Ángela Molina	Drama	Spanish co-production. David di Donatello winner
Il piccolo Archimede	Gianni Amelio	Laura Betti, John Steiner	poliziottesco	
A Policewoman on the Porno Squad	Michele Massimo Tarantini	Edwige Fenech, Lino Banfi, Alvaro Vitali	Commedia sexy all'italiana	
Porci con la P 38	Paolo and Vittorio Taviani	Marc Porel, Laura Belli	poliziottesco	
Play Motel	Mario Gariazzo	Anna Maria Rizzoli, Ray Lovelock	giallo	
Ratataplan	Maurizio Nichetti	Maurizio Nichetti, Angela Finocchiaro	Comedy	
Le rose di Danzica	Alberto Bevilacqua	Franco Nero, Helmut Berger, Olga Karlatos	war drama	
Saturday, Sunday and Friday	Castellano & Pipolo, Pasquale Festa Campanile, Sergio Martino	Adriano Celentano, Edwige Fenech, Barbara Bouchet, Lino Banfi	Comedy	
Scusi lei è normale?	Umberto Lenzi	Renzo Montagnani, Ray Lovelock, Anna Maria Rizzoli	Commedia sexy all'italiana	
Seeking Asylum (Chiedo asilo)	Marco Ferreri	Roberto Benigni, Dominique Laffin	Comedy	Berlin Award
The Shark Hunter	Enzo G. Castellari	Franco Nero, Werner Pochath	Adventure	filmed in Mexico
The Sheriff and the Satellite Kid	Michele Lupo	Bud Spencer, Cary Guffey	Comedy	
Le strelle nel fosso	Pupi Avati	Lino Capolicchio, Gianni Cavina, Carlo Delle Piane	—N/a	
Supersonic Man	Juan Piquer Simón	Cameron Mitchell	superhero	
Terror Express	Ferdinando Baldi	Silvia Dionisio, Werner Pochath	rape and revenge	
Tigers in Lipstick	Luigi Zampa	Ursula Andress, Monica Vitti, Roberto Benigni, Sylvia Kristel	Comedy	
Together?	Armenia Balducci	Jacqueline Bisset, Maximilian Schell, Terence Stamp, Monica Guerritore	romance drama	
To Forget Venice	Franco Brusati	Erland Josephson, Mariangela Melato, Erland Josephson	Drama	David di Donatello Best Film winner. Academy Award nominee. Gay interest
Traffic Jam	Luigi Comencini	Gérard Depardieu, Ugo Tognazzi, Marcello Mastroianni, Stefania Sandrelli, Alberto Sordi	drama	
Velvet Hands	Castellano & Pipolo	Adriano Celentano, Eleonora Giorgi	comedy	
The Visitor	Giulio Paradisi	Mel Ferrer, Glenn Ford, John Huston, Franco Nero, Sam Peckinpah	psychological thriller	
I viaggiatori della sera	Ugo Tognazzi	Ugo Tognazzi, Ornella Vanoni, Corinne Cléry	science fiction-drama	
Where Can You Go Without the Little Vice?	Marino Girolami	Renzo Montagnani, Paola Senatore, Alvaro Vitali	Commedia sexy all'italiana	
Zombi 2	Lucio Fulci	Tisa Farrow	Horror	
Zombie Holocaust	Marino Girolami	Ian McCulloch	Horror	
