= The Week at the Beach =

1981 film

- Directed by: Mariano Laurenti
- Screenplay by: Mariano Laurenti; Francesco Milizia
- Produced by: Giovanni Di Clemente
- Starring: Anna Maria Rizzoli
- Cinematography: Maurizio Maggi
- Edited by: Alberto Moriani
- Music by: Gianni Ferrio
- Distributed by: Titanus
- Release date: 1981
- Language: Italian

The Week at the Beach (Italian: La settimana al mare) is a 1981 commedia sexy all'italiana film directed by Mariano Laurenti.

== Cast ==
- Anna Maria Rizzoli as Angela Marconcini
- Enzo Cannavale as Antonio Martinelli
- Bombolo as Orazio Canestrari
- Andrea Occhipinti as Carlo Martinelli
- Francesca Romana Coluzzi as Elvira Martinelli
- Paola Senatore as miss Margaret
- Vincenzo Crocitti as Tito
- Lucio Montanaro as Tazio
- Annamaria Clementi as Rosalia
- Brigitte Petronio as Maria
- Jimmy il Fenomeno as Cheated Man

== Production ==
The film was shot back-to-back with Girls Will Be Girls, sharing most of its cast and crew. The working title was L'insegnante di nuoto ('The swimming teacher'), and it was filmed in Bagheria, with principal photography starting on 14 July 1980. It was produced by Cleminternazionale.

== Release ==
The film was released in Italian cinemas by Titanus on 5 March 1981.

== Reception ==
Corriere della Sera's film critic Giovanna Grassi described it as a film "full of banalities and discolored characters [...] in a genre that seems to have been exploited to the hilt".
