= Liquirizia =

- Directed by: Salvatore Samperi
- Written by: Giorgio Basile; Gianfranco Manfredi; Salvatore Samperi
- Starring: Massimo Anzellotti; Enzo Cannavale; Christian De Sica; Simona Mariani; Eros Pagni; Stefano Ruzzante; Tino Schirinzi; Jenny Tamburi; Teo Teocoli; Barbara Bouchet
- Cinematography: Pasqualino De Santis
- Music by: Gianfranco Manfredi; Ricky Gianco
- Distributed by: Titanus
- Release date: 1979
- Running time: 103 minutes
- Country: Italy
- Language: Italian

Liquirizia (Italian for "Liquorice") is a 1979 Italian teen comedy film written and directed by Salvatore Samperi and starring Massimo Anzellotti, Enzo Cannavale, Christian De Sica, Simona Mariani, Eros Pagni, Stefano Ruzzante, Jenny Tamburi, Teo Teocoli, Tino Schirinzi, and Barbara Bouchet.

The film has frequently been labeled as Italy's answer to American Graffiti.

== Plot ==
In 1959, in Padua, Fulvio and Carletto are two friends in their final year of school. Fulvio attends an accounting institute and comes from a working-class family. Despite his father's attempts to introduce him to socialism, Fulvio prefers to follow the latest trends—sports, cars, rock music, and women. Carletto, on the other hand, is enrolled in a classical high school, comes from a wealthy bourgeois family, and dreams of moving to Rome to become a theatrical director.

The two decide to organize their end-of-year celebration together, bringing together high school students and accounting students. Their plan is to raise money from the event and have fun. Carletto is responsible for preparing and directing the show, while Fulvio travels to Milan to persuade singer Adriano Celentano to participate. Instead of meeting Celentano, Fulvio encounters a boastful rock singer named Flynt, whom he invites to perform at the show.

With some effort, Carletto convinces Mrs. Raffaella, the mother of a younger student, to lend them a family-owned theater free of charge for the show. The theater is managed by a Neapolitan caretaker who idolizes Eduardo De Filippo and keeps a close eye on the students. The high schoolers prepare various performances, from ballet and opera to Shakespeare, while the accounting students focus on rock songs and variety acts. Among the high school students are Gian Galeazzo Lo Cascio, a naïve wealthy heir engaged to Marina; Giulia, who has a crush on Carletto; the friendly and playful Baffi; and Bartolozzi, the redheaded daughter of a wealthy shoemaker, who is infatuated with Fulvio. The accounting students include the aggressive Maiale and Coen, who often clash with the others.

Raffaella develops feelings for Carletto and helps him believe in himself, encouraging him to keep the show on track. However, when the day of the performance arrives, everything goes wrong. The dance and acting acts are booed by the audience, Flynt proves to be a failure and is kicked out, and a group of former students, led by rock singer Tonazzi, known as "Be-Bop-A-Lula", storms onto the stage and takes control of the scene. The event ends in a violent brawl. Carletto realizes he has failed and asks Raffaella to go to Rome with him, but she politely declines.

After summer vacation, before leaving for the capital, Carletto visits Fulvio at Bartolozzi's shop, where Fulvio now works. There, he hints that he has given in to the girl's advances. Bartolozzi, smiling, looks at them, voraciously chewing a licorice stick.

== Cast ==
- Massimo Anzellotti as Fulvio
- Enzo Cannavale as the theatre caretaker
- Christian De Sica as Gian Galeazzo Lo Cascio
- Simona Mariani as Giulia
- Eros Pagni as Pierone
- Stefano Ruzzante as Carletto
- Tino Schirinzi as professor Martini
- Jenny Tamburi as Marina
- Teo Teocoli as Flynt
- Barbara Bouchet as Raffaella
- Gigi Ballista as Mr. Bartolozzi
- Paolo Baroni as Giampiero
- Cristiana Borghi as a student
- Diego Cappuccio as a student
- Francesca Codispoti as a student
- Sergio Di Pinto as Maiale
- Benedetta Fazzini as Bartolozzi
- Sandro Ghiani as Coen
- Ricky Gianco as Tonazzi "Be-Bop-A-Lula"
- Enzo Liberti as Fulvio's father
- Giancarlo Magalli as Baffi
- Gianfranco Manfredi as the marginalized student
- Gianni Monti as the Neapolitan singer
- Paolo and Pietro Zambiasi as the "duo Mauthausen"
- Alberto Fortis as the singer at the recording studio (uncredited)
- Carmen Russo as Fulvio's interest (uncredited)
- Peter Bark as the dwarf (uncredited)

== See also ==
- List of Italian films of 1979
