= The Finzi Detective Agency =

1979 Italian crime comedy film

- Directed by: Bruno Corbucci
- Written by: Mario Amendola; Bruno Corbucci
- Produced by: Galliano Juso
- Starring: Renato Pozzetto
- Cinematography: Giovanni Ciarlo
- Music by: Guido & Maurizio De Angelis
- Release date: December 21, 1979
- Running time: 92 minutes
- Language: Italian

The Finzi Detective Agency (Italian: Agenzia Riccardo Finzi... praticamente detective) is a 1979 Italian crime-comedy film written and directed by Bruno Corbucci and starring Renato Pozzetto. It is loosely based on the novel character Riccardo Finzi created by Max Bunker.

== Plot ==
Riccardo Finzi is a private investigator who moves to Milan in search of fortune. On his first night in town, he meets a mysterious girl named Susy, who is later found dead. Convinced of foul play, he and his assistant Giuseppe decide to investigate.

== In pop culture ==
Investigator Riccardo Finzi, a supporter of football club A.C. Monza, declared in a sentence: "I support Monza, we will never be able to reach the Serie A". The quote became a classic in Monza culture, and was made part of a fan chant: "Il nostro Calcio Monza è in C1, e non andremo mai in Serie A. Ma io non mollerò, questa è la mia mentalità. segui anche tu la squadra della tua città" (Our Calcio Monza is in [Serie] C1, and we will never go to Serie A. But I will not give up, this is my mentality. You too follow the team of your city).

== Cast ==
- Renato Pozzetto as Riccardo Finzi
- Simona Mariani as Samantha
- Enzo Cannavale as Giuseppe aka Ciammarica
- Olga Karlatos as Clara Moser
- Silvano Tranquilli as Augusto Moser
- Elio Zamuto as Commissioner Salimbeni
- Massimo Belli as Pellegrini
- Lory Del Santo as Pierpaola Moser
- Luca Sportelli as Doorman
- Barbara De Bortoli as Arista
- Adriana Facchetti as Pina Parenti
- Franco Caracciolo as Moser's Butler

== See also ==
- List of Italian films of 1979
