= Una vacanza del cactus =

1981 film by Mariano Laurenti

- Italian theatrical release poster
- Directed by: Mariano Laurenti
- Written by: Mariano Laurenti; Alessandro Metz; Francesco Milizia; Franco Verucci
- Starring: Anna Maria Rizzoli
- Edited by: Mauro Bonanni
- Music by: Gianni Ferrio
- Production company: Cleminternazionale Cinematografica
- Distributed by: Titanus, Italia 1, Odeon
- Release date: August 18, 1981 (Italy)
- Running time: 95 minutes
- Country: Italy
- Language: Italian

Una vacanza del cactus is a 1981 Italian commedia sexy all'italiana directed by Mariano Laurenti.

== Plot ==
Rome, Italy, in early 1980s. Mr. Zerboni (Enzo Cannavale) goes on vacation in Rhodes, Greece with his wife Fedora(Graziella Polesinanti) and a group of employees: Mr. Pistilli, Augusto (Bombolo) and Angela (Anna Maria Rizzoli). Misunderstandings and troubles multiply while Mr.Zerboni tries to seduce Angela, and his wife Fedora messes up for her high myopia despite she got her first ever pair of strong eyeglasses. Fedora doesn't realizes that her husband is trying to seduce Angela due to her extremely poor eyesight which couldn't be fully corrected even with the eyeglasses.

== Cast ==
- Anna Maria Rizzoli as Angela Marconcini
- Bombolo as Augusto Squarciarelli
- Enzo Cannavale as Giuseppe Zerboni
- Bruno Minniti as Bruno
- Xiomara Rodriguez as Amina
- Mario Brega as Uncle
- Graziella Polesinanti as Fedora
- Vincenzo Crocitti as Pistilli
- Ennio Antonelli as Peppone
- Dino Cassio as Infermiere greco
- Franca Scagnetti as Katina

== Release ==
The film was released in Italy on August 18, 1981.

== Critics ==
IMDB ratings 5.1/10 (92 reviews), MYmovies 2.1/5 (12 reviews), ComingSoon.it 3.7/5 (6 reviews)

== See also ==
- List of Italian films of 1981
