= Poker in Bed =

1974 film by Giuliano Carnimeo

- Directed by: Giuliano Carnimeo
- Written by: Tito Carpi; Mariano Laurenti; Francesco Milizia
- Produced by: Luciano Martino
- Starring: Edwige Fenech
- Cinematography: Federico Zanni
- Edited by: Eugenio Alabiso
- Music by: Alessandro Alessandroni
- Release date: 1974
- Language: Italian

La signora gioca bene a scopa?, internationally released as Poker in Bed, is a 1974 commedia sexy all'italiana directed by Giuliano Carnimeo.

== Plot ==
Michele, owner of a shoe store in Parma, is an avid but unlucky poker player: to repay his debts, he decides to become a prostitute

== Cast ==
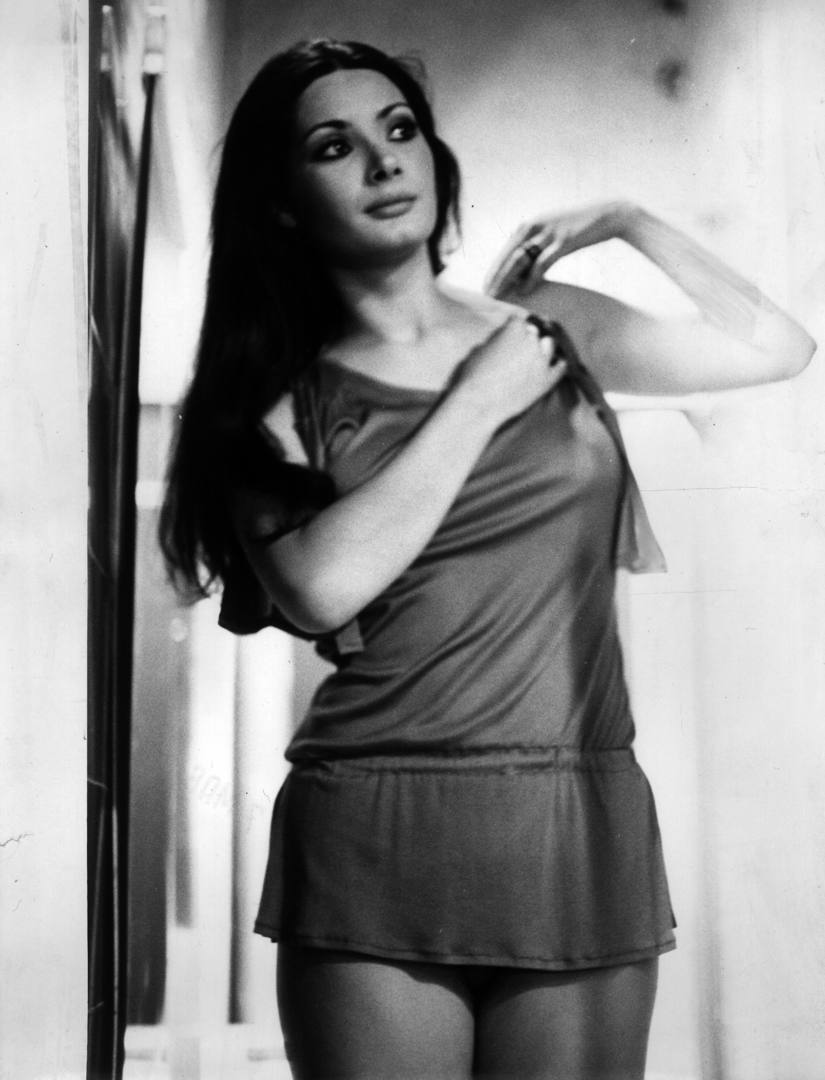
Fenech as Eva in Poker in Bed

- Edwige Fenech as Eva
- Carlo Giuffrè as Michele Cammagliulo
- Carlo Delle Piane as Tonino
- Oreste Lionello as Alberto
- Enzo Cannavale as Peppino
- Franca Valeri as Giulia Nascimbeni
- Didi Perego as Monica
- Gigi Ballista as Gervasio Caminata
- Lia Tanzi as Marisa
- Enzo Andronico as the Doctor

== See also ==
- List of Italian films of 1974
