= Bombolo =

Italian character actor and comedian

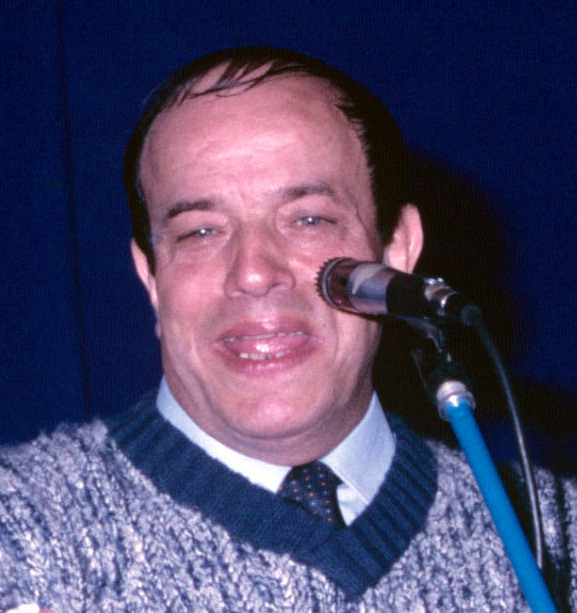
- Born: Franco Lechner; 22 May 1931; Rome, Italy
- Died: 21 August 1987 (aged 56); Rome, Italy
- Occupation: Actor
- Years active: 1966–1987
- Height: 1.68 m (5 ft 6 in)

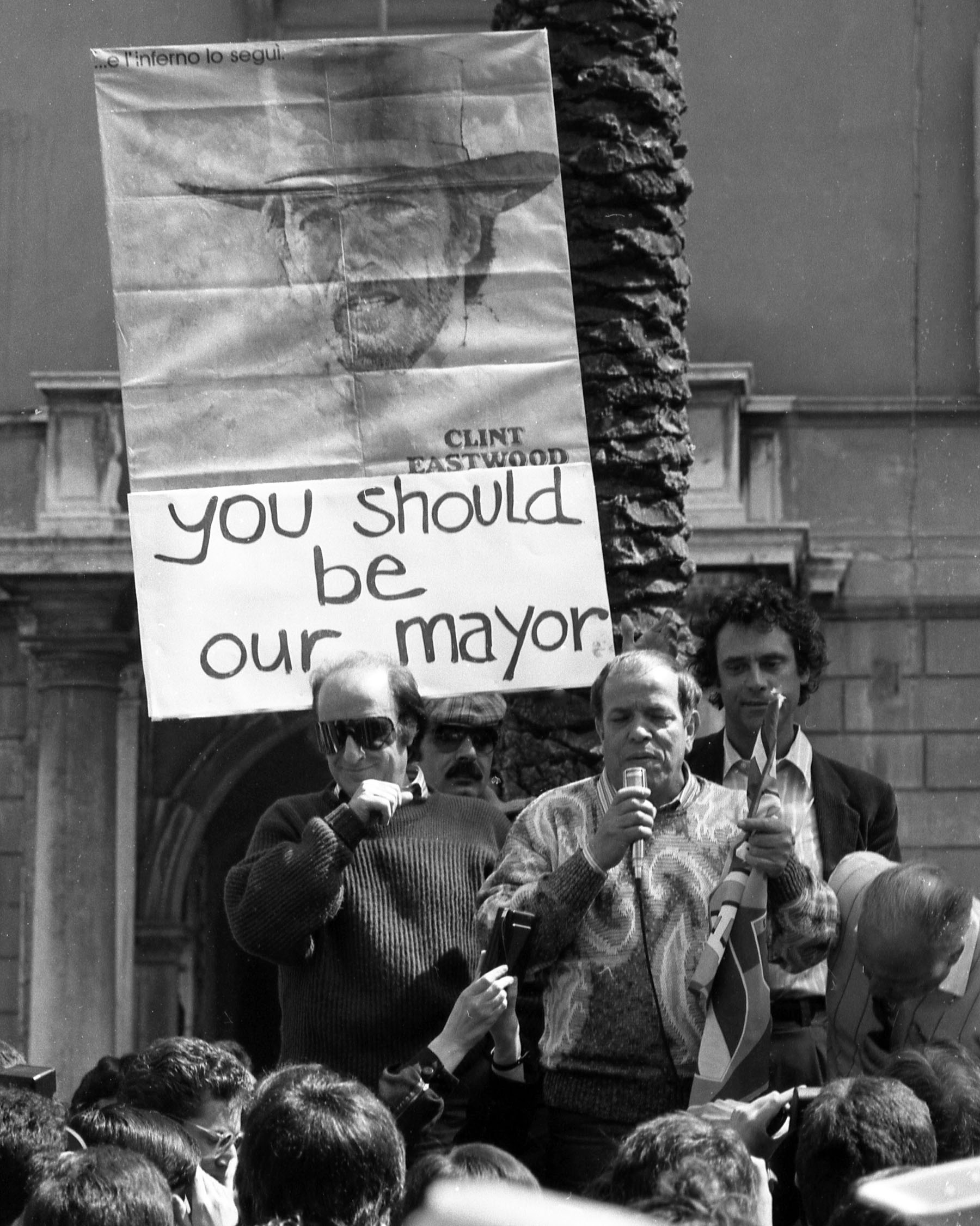
Giorgio Bracardi, Renato Nicolini, and Bombolo, at an anti-fast food demonstration in Piazza di Spagna, 20 April 1986

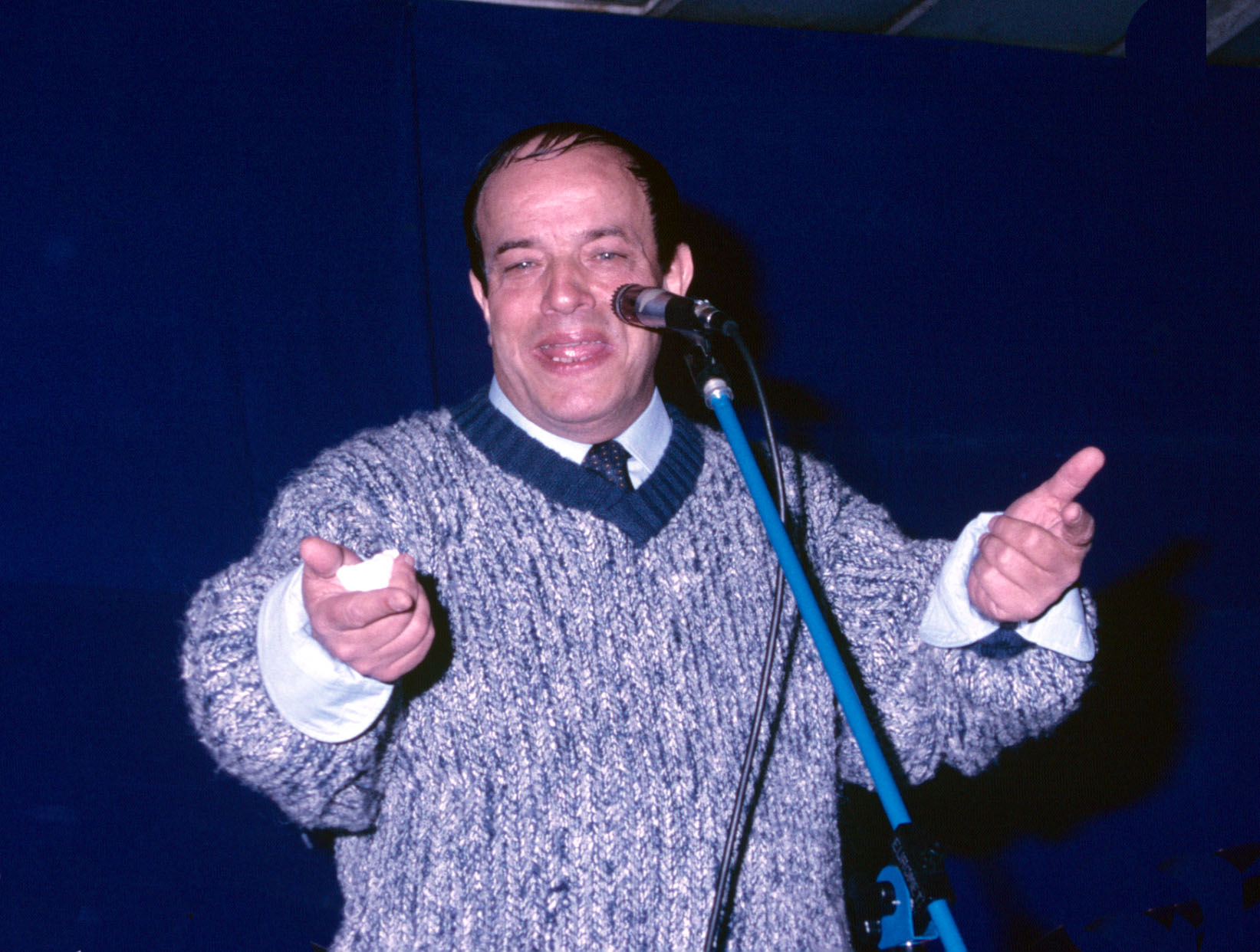
Bombolo, 1983

Franco Lechner, best known as Bombolo (Note: colloquially meaning tubby person.) (22 May 1931 – 21 August 1987), was an Italian character actor and comedian.

== Life and career ==
Born in Rome into a poor family, a former peddler of dishes, Lechner was discovered in a tavern by Franco Castellacci and Pierfrancesco Pingitore, who entered him in their cabaret company "Il Bagaglino". He got a large popularity in cinema as the sidekick of Tomas Milian in a successful series of poliziottesco films directed by Bruno Corbucci. He was also partner of Enzo Cannavale in a number of comedy films. He died at age 56 as a result of complications following a major surgical operation. Even after several decades, younger generations continue to embrace his characteristic slang, particularly his distinctive and iconic "tze tze".

== Partial filmography ==
- Remo e Romolo (Storia di due figli di una lupa) (1976) – Pappo
- La prima notte di nozze (1976)
- Hit Squad (1976) – Er Trippa
- Nerone (1977) – Roscio
- Il marito in collegio (1977) – Killer
- Messalina, Messalina (1977) – Zenturio Bisone
- Swindle (1977) – Franco 'Venticello' Bertarelli
- Little Italy (1978) – Venticello
- Scherzi da prete (1978) – Bombolo
- Assassinio sul Tevere (1979) – Franco 'Venticello' Bertarelli
- Tutti a squola (1979) – Bombolo il bidello
- L'imbranato (1979) – Bombolo, il genero
- Ciao marziano (1980) – Pietro
- Girls Will Be Girls (1980) – Giulio Cesare
- Delitto a Porta Romana (1980) – Franco 'Venticello' Bertarelli
- Il casinista (1980) – Poldo
- L'amante tutta da scoprire (1981) – Bombolo
- The Week at the Beach (1981) – Orazio Canestrari
- Uno contro l'altro, praticamente amici (1981) – Capoccione
- I carabbinieri (1981) – Mozzarella
- Una vacanza del cactus (1981) – Augusto Squarciarelli
- Crime at the Chinese Restaurant (1981) – Bombolo
- Miracoloni (1981) – Taxista
- Il marito in vacanza (1981) – Agenore
- W la foca (1982) – Doctor Filippo Patacchiola
- Attenti a quei P2 (1982) – Bombolo il portiere
- Il sommergibile più pazzo del mondo (1982) – Il Postino
- Delitto sull'autostrada (1982) – Venticello
- Sturmtruppen 2 (tutti al fronte) (1982)
- La sai l'ultima sui matti? (1982) – Caciotta
- È forte un casino! (1982) – Cicciobello
- Un jeans e una maglietta (1983)
- Sfrattato cerca casa equo canone (1983) – Maciste
- La discoteca (1983) – Bombolo
- Crime in Formula One (1984) – Venticello
- Cop in Drag (1984) – Franco 'Venticello' Bertarelli
- Vacanze d'estate (1985) – Cardinale
- Giuro che ti amo (1986) – (final film role)

== Notes and references ==
Notes
