= An Average Little Man =

An Average Little Man (Un borghese piccolo piccolo)
- Italian film poster
- Directed by: Mario Monicelli
- Written by: Vincenzo Cerami; Sergio Amidei; Mario Monicelli
- Based on: Un borghese piccolo piccolo by Vincenzo Cerami
- Produced by: Aurelio De Laurentiis; Luigi De Laurentiis
- Starring: Alberto Sordi; Shelley Winters; Romolo Valli; Vincenzo Crocitti
- Cinematography: Mario Vulpiani
- Edited by: Ruggero Mastroianni
- Music by: Giancarlo Chiaramello
- Distributed by: Cineriz
- Release date: 17 March 1977
- Running time: 118 minutes
- Country: Italy
- Language: Italian

An Average Little Man (Italian: Un borghese piccolo piccolo, literally meaning a petty petty bourgeois, also known in English as A Very Little Man) is a 1977 Italian drama film directed by Mario Monicelli. It is based on the novel of the same name written by Vincenzo Cerami. The movie mixes "Italian-Style Comedy" (commedia all'italiana) with psychological drama tragedy. The film was an entrant in the 1977 Cannes Film Festival. In 2008, the film was included on the Italian Ministry of Cultural Heritage’s 100 Italian films to be saved, a list of 100 films that "have changed the collective memory of the country between 1942 and 1978."

== Plot ==
Giovanni Vivaldi (Alberto Sordi) is a petty bourgeois, modest white-collar worker nearing retirement in a public office in the capital. His life is divided between work and family. With his wife Amalia (Shelley Winters) he shares high hopes for his son, Mario (Vincenzo Crocitti), a newly qualified accountant, not a particularly bright boy who willingly assists his father's efforts to make him hired in the same office.

The father, in an attempt to guide his son, emphasizes the point of practicing humility in the presence of his superiors at work, and he enrolled himself in a Masonic lodge to help him gain friendships and favoritisms that, at first, he would never hope to have.

Just as the attempts of Giovanni Vivaldi seems to turn to success, his son Mario is killed, hit by a stray bullet during a shootout that erupts following a robbery in which the father and son are accidentally involved.

Misfortune and sufferings consequently distort the lives, beliefs and morality of the Vivaldis. Amalia becomes ill, loses her voice and becomes seriously handicapped. Giovanni, now blinded by grief and hatred, throws himself headlong into an isolated and desperate quest. He identifies his son's murderer, abducts him, takes him to a secluded cabin and submits him to torture and violence, eventually bringing the killer of his child to a slow death.

Then, for Giovanni arrives - at his set date - his retirement and, only a day later, the death of his wife, who had by now been overcome by her disability.

Giovanni is now prepared with serenity and resignation to live into old age, but a spontaneous verbal confrontation with a young idler revives in him the role of an executioner who will, presumably, kill again.

== Cast ==
- Alberto Sordi - Giovanni Vivaldi
- Shelley Winters - Amalia Vivaldi
- Vincenzo Crocitti - Mario Vivaldi
- Romolo Valli - Dr. Spaziani
- Renzo Carboni - Robber
- Enrico Beruschi - Toti
- Marcello Di Martire
- Francesco D'Adda - (as Francesca D'Adda Salvaterra)
- Edoardo Florio
- Ettore Garofolo - Young Man on Street

== Awards ==
- 3 David di Donatello : Best Film, Best Director and Best Actor (Alberto Sordi).
- 4 Nastro d'Argento :Best Actor, Best Script, Best New Actor (Vincenzo Crocitti), Best Supporting Actor (Romolo Valli).
