= Where Can You Go Without the Little Vice? =

1979 film by Marino Girolami

- Italian theatrical release poster
- Directed by: Franco Martinelli
- Written by: Gianfranco Couyoumdjian; Carlo Veo
- Produced by: Fabrizio De Angelis; Gianfranco Couyoumdjian
- Starring: Renzo Montagnani; Alvaro Vitali; Paola Senatore; Mario Carotenuto
- Cinematography: Federico Zanni
- Edited by: Alberto Moriani
- Music by: Berto Pisano
- Production companies: Flora Film; Fulvia Film; Gico Cinematografica
- Distributed by: Variety Distribution
- Release date: 1979
- Language: Italian

Where Can You Go Without the Little Vice? (Italian: Dove vai se il vizietto non ce l'hai?) is a 1979 commedia sexy all'italiana film directed by Marino Girolami (under the pseudonym "Franco Martinelli").

The film stars Renzo Montagnani, Alvaro Vitali, Paola Senatore and Mario Carotenuto.

== Plot ==
A private investigator is hired by a seductive woman, who undertakes to find out if there are other women in the life of her husband, a wealthy and powerful businessman. To avoid arousing the suspicions of her husband, the detective and his assistant are forced to pass himself off, respectively, for the butler homosexual Diogenes and for Carlotta cook and, with the complicity of his wife, they are taken inside the house, along the rest of the servants.

But the task is quite difficult for the two investigators, one dealing with three women that they assiduously court, and the other with an abusive gardener sex maniac. During a shadowing of her husband, the two detectives discover that this is actually a homosexual who likes to wear women's clothes, and has a relationship with a transvestite, a former boxer middleweight champion Lazio. Accordatisi with her husband for a double-digit compared to the promise from the lady, the two pretend not to have seen anything, so as to receive double compensation by both spouses.

Having completed the task, the two return home, giving a lift to two Finnish women, which are actually two men who rob them of all the money and car.

== Cast ==
- Renzo Montagnani as Diogene Colombo
- Alvaro Vitali as Aroldo / Carlotta / Gigetto
- Paola Senatore as Miss Beltramelli
- Mario Carotenuto as Mr. Beltramelli
- Stefano Amato as Beniamino Colombo
- Lory Del Santo as Irma
- Sabrina Siani as Mrs. Francesca
- Angie Vibeker as Emma
- Franco Caracciolo as a transvestite
- Vittorio De Bisogno: Anselmo
- Franco Caracciolo as Commander
- Ronald Mardenbro as Calypso

== Reception ==
The Italian Cinema Dictionary wrote that "with Renzo Montagnani as the butler, swaying his hips and singing in a falsetto voice, and Alvaro Vitali disguised as a bungling cook, the film immediately settles into farce; but, with a screenplay by Carlo Veo and direction by Franco Martinelli, it inevitably descends into vulgarity, lascivious winks, and a heavy-handed play of jokes now devoid of any double meaning."

LongTake opined that the film has "a frenetic pace, classic lines, stellar actors, and textbook erotic allusions; profanity abounds and the humor is heavy, but the playful and irreverent spirit that pervades the film is irresistible, even despite the shoddy production." Gay.it observed "this lighthearted and chaotic comedy is an irresistible mix of romantic misunderstandings and comical situations, brought to life by the talent of its protagonists, Lando Buzzanca is brilliant as Franco."

Film critic Massimiliano Schiavoni said the film "is a shining example of a tattered and stylistically botched sexy comedy, which doesn't even stand out for any particular merit in the overall construction of the narrative device, but it's permeated throughout by a clear and delightful sense of moral freedom." Girolami went on to say that over the years, the film has become notable "essentially for the fresh boldness with which the film addressed the theme of homosexuality."

== See also ==
- Cinema of Italy
- List of Italian films of 1979
- List of Italian film directors
- List of LGBTQ-related films of 1979
