= Chaste and Pure =

1981 film by Salvatore Samperi

- Directed by: Salvatore Samperi
- Written by: Michel Gast; Ottavio Jemma
- Starring: Laura Antonelli; Fernando Rey; Christian De Sica; Enzo Cannavale; Gabrielle Lazure; Jean-Marc Bory; Vincenzo Crocitti; Massimo Ranieri
- Cinematography: Alberto Spagnoli
- Music by: Alfonso Santisteban
- Release date: 1981
- Running time: 88 minutes
- Language: Italian

Casta e pura (internationally released as Chaste and Pure) is a 1981 Italian erotic film directed by Salvatore Samperi.

== Cast ==
- Laura Antonelli: Rosa
- Fernando Rey: Antonio
- Massimo Ranieri: Fernando
- Enzo Cannavale: Bottazzi, the priest
- Christian De Sica: Carletto Morosini
- Valeria Fabrizi: second wife of Bottesini
- Riccardo Billi: father of Caletto
- Vincenzo Crocitti: Picci
- Sergio Di Pinto: Gustavo Bottesini
- Gabrielle Lazure: Lisetta
- Diego Cappuccio: Dario Di Maggio
- Jean-Marc Bory
- Elsa Vazzoler
- Luis Ciges
