= Night Nurse (1979 film) =

1979 film by Mariano Laurenti

- Directed by: Mariano Laurenti
- Written by: Francesco Milizia; Mariano Laurenti
- Produced by: Luciano Martino
- Starring: Gloria Guida; Lino Banfi
- Cinematography: Mario Vulpiani
- Edited by: Alberto Moriani
- Music by: Gianni Ferrio
- Release date: 1979
- Running time: 95 minutes
- Country: Italy
- Language: Italian

L'infermiera di notte, internationally released as Night Nurse, is a 1979 commedia sexy all'italiana film written and directed by Mariano Laurenti.

== Plot ==
Doctor Nicola Pischella is an unrepentant womanizer who systematically cheats on his jealous wife Lucia between visits to his dental office. Things get complicated when the old and weird Saverio, Lucia's uncle, arrives at the Pischella house, who says he is ill and now close to death.

In exchange for hospitality and assistance, she promises a generous bequest to his niece. To provide for the elderly relative, the beautiful Angela Della Torre is hired as a night nurse with whom Carlo, a young and shy student son of Nicola, will fall in love, and who will make the dentist himself and his clumsy assistant Peppino lose their heads.

Between misunderstandings, betrayals and mistaken identities, which will also include Zaira, Nicola's historical lover, and a busty neighbor, Angela will get engaged to Carlo, while it will be discovered that Saverio is not Lucia's real uncle, but an impostor who had entered his house only to steal a precious diamond hidden in the chandelier.

== Cast ==
- Gloria Guida – Angela Della Torre
- Lino Banfi – Nicola Pischella
- Alvaro Vitali – Peppino
- Leo Colonna – Carlo Pischella
- Mario Carotenuto – Zio Saverio / Alfredo
- Francesca Romana Coluzzi – Lucia, wife of Nicola
- Paola Senatore – Zaira
- Anna Maria Clementi – Moglie del pugile
- Lucio Montanaro – D.J.

== See also ==
- List of Italian films of 1979
