= Play Motel =

- Directed by: Mario Gariazzo
- Written by: Mario Gariazzo
- Produced by: Armando Novelli
- Starring: Anna Maria Rizzoli; Ray Lovelock
- Cinematography: Aldo Greci
- Music by: Ubaldo Continiello
- Release date: 1979
- Running time: 90 minutes
- Language: Italian

Play Motel is a 1979 Italian giallo film written and directed by Mario Gariazzo (credited as Roy Garrett) and starring Anna Maria Rizzoli and Ray Lovelock.

Play Motel was released on blu-ray in a region 1 release by Raro Video in August 2015. The release contains an extra feature of the hardcore inserts.

== Plot ==
Patrizia and Roberto, theatrical actors and spouses, after having stayed at the Play Motel, accidentally find a body in the trunk of their car. They leave the car at the scene and go to call the police, and when they arrive, they discover with amazement the removal of the body, which is then found in a completely different place: the police then discover that it was Maria Luisa Longhi, wife of Commendator Rinaldo Cortesi. At the request in particular of Patrizia, the two spouses improvise as investigators to help the police solve the case.

== Cast ==
- Anna Maria Rizzoli as Patrizia
- Ray Lovelock as Roberto Vinci
- Mario Cutini as Willy
- Antonella Antinori as Anna De Marchis
- Patrizia Behn as Maria Luisa Longhi
- Enzo Fisichella as Commendator Rinaldo Cortesi
- Marina Hedman as Loredana Salvi
- Marino Masé as Massimo "Max" Liguori
- Patrizia Webley as Valeria Marzotti
- Vittorio Ripamonti as Inspector Guido Toselli
- Anthony Steffen as Commissioner De Santis
- Mario Novelli as The Doorman

== See also ==
- List of Italian films of 1979
