= Blazing Flowers =

1978 film

- Directed by: Gianni Martucci
- Screenplay by: Ludovica Marineo; Luca Sportelli; Gianni Martucci
- Story by: Luca Sportelli
- Starring: Marc Porel; George Hilton; Anna Maria Rizzoli; Barbara Magnolfi; Music Gianni Ferrio
- Cinematography: Richard Grassetti
- Release date: 5 February 1978
- Language: Italian
- Box office: ₤593,395 million

Blazing Flowers (Italian: Milano... difendersi o morire, literally: "Milan ... to defend or to die"), is a 1978 Italian Poliziesco film co-written and directed by Gianni Martucci and starring Marc Porel, George Hilton and Anna Maria Rizzoli.

== Cast ==
- Marc Porel as Pino Scalise
- George Hilton as Commissioner Morani
- Anna Maria Rizzoli as Marina 'Fiorella'
- Al Cliver as Domino
- Barbara Magnolfi as Teresa
- Anthony Freeman as Nosey
- Guido Leontini as Don Chicco
- Parvin Tabriz as Virginia Mallo
- Nino Vingelli as Nicola

== Reception ==
In Italy, the film was distributed by Lark and it grossed 593,395,110 lire.

In his analysis of the film, Roberto Curti heavily criticized it, noting "the film's half-baked plot, filled with clichés worthy of a bad sceneggiata" and "the tone [...] closer to that of a lurid comic book".

== See also ==
- List of Italian films of 1978
