= Per amore di Poppea =

1977 film by Mariano Laurenti

- Directed by: Mariano Laurenti
- Produced by: Luciano Martino
- Cinematography: Giancarlo Ferrando
- Music by: Gianni Ferrio
- Release date: 1977
- Country: Italy
- Language: Italian

Per amore di Poppea (For the Love of Poppaea) is a 1977 Italian commedia sexy all'italiana directed by Mariano Laurenti and set in ancient Rome.

== Cast ==
- María Baxa as Poppaea Sabina
- Gianfranco D'Angelo as Tizio
- Alvaro Vitali as Caio
- Oreste Lionello as Nero
- Renato Chiantoni as Seneca
- Toni Ucci as Tigellinus
- Tiberio Murgia

== See also ==
- List of Italian films of 1977
