= The Boss and the Worker =

1975 film

- Theatrical release poster by Renato Casaro
- Directed by: Steno
- Written by: Sergio Donati; Luciano Vincenzoni
- Produced by: Carlo Ponti
- Starring: Renato Pozzetto; Teo Teocoli; Francesca Romana Coluzzi; Gianfranco Barra; Gillian Bray
- Cinematography: Luigi Kuveiller
- Music by: Gianni Ferrio
- Release date: 1975
- Language: Italian

The Boss and the Worker (Italian: Il padrone e l'operaio) is a 1975 Italian comedy film directed by Steno.

== Plot ==
Gianluca Tosi, owner of a tap factory, is exhausted: the management of the company is an overwhelming task. Both his wife and his mistress have exhausted him. He has run out of energy. One of his workers, Luigi Carminati, is instead a fury: a monster of sexual vigor that has enormous success with women.

== Cast ==
- Renato Pozzetto:Gianluca Tosi
- Teo Teocoli: Luigi Carminati
- Francesca Romana Coluzzi: Maria Luce Balestrazzi
- Gillian Bray: Silvana
- Gianfranco Barra: Vismara
- Loris Zanchi: Commendator Balestrazzi
- Guido Nicheli: Guido
- Walter Valdi: Bauer lo psichiatra
- Loredana Bertè: Maria Grazia Marigotti
- Anna Maria Rizzoli: Violante

== See also ==
- List of Italian films of 1975
