= The Gang That Sold America =

1979 Italian crime comedy film

- Directed by: Bruno Corbucci
- Screenplay by: Mario Amendola; Bruno Corbucci
- Story by: Mario Amendola; Bruno Corbucci
- Produced by: Galliano Juso
- Starring: Tomas Milian; Enzo Cannavale; Margherita Fumero; Gianni Musy
- Cinematography: Giovanni Ciarlo
- Edited by: Daniele Alabiso
- Music by: Goblin
- Production company: Cinemaster
- Distributed by: Titanus
- Release date: 1 March 1979
- Running time: 90 minutes
- Country: Italy
- Box office: ₤569 million

The Gang That Sold America (Italian: Squadra antigangsters) is a 1979 Italian "poliziottesco"-comedy film directed by Bruno Corbucci. It is the fifth chapter in the Nico Giraldi film series starred by Tomas Milian. The Italian progressive rock band Goblin created the soundtrack for the film.

== Cast ==
- Tomas Milian as Nico Giraldi
- Enzo Cannavale as Salvatore Esposito
- Asha Puthli as Fiona Strike
- Leo Gavero as Don Vito
- Isa Danieli as Salvatore Esposito's Wife
- Margherita Fumero as Maria Sole Giarra
- Gianni Musy as Gitto Cardone
- Tomas Milian Jr. as Antonio, Salvatore Esposito's Child
- Andrea Aureli as Don Mimì
- Irwin Keyes as Support Killer

== Production ==
The Gang That Sold America is one of the 11 films in which the Cuban actor Tomas Milian portrayed the character of Commissioner Nico Giraldi between 1976 and 1984.

== Release ==
The Gang that Sold America was released on March 1, 1979 where it was distributed by Titanus. It grossed a total of 569 million Italian lire.

== See also ==
- List of Italian films of 1979

== Notes ==
=== References ===
- Curti, Roberto (2013). Italian Crime Filmography, 1968-1980. McFarland. ISBN 978-0786469765.
