= L'onorevole con l'amante sotto il letto =

1981 film by Mariano Laurenti

- Directed by: Mariano Laurenti
- Written by: Luciano Martino; Francesco Milizia
- Starring: Lino Banfi; Janet Agren
- Cinematography: Federico Zanni
- Music by: Gianni Ferrio
- Release date: 1981
- Language: Italian

L'onorevole con l'amante sotto il letto (transl. The honorable with his lover under the bed) is a 1981 commedia sexy all'italiana directed by Mariano Laurenti.

== Plot ==
Anna Vinci is a teacher in a private school in Milan. Due to some pupils, she comes into conflict with the principal of the school who fires her. She decides to go to Rome to visit the parliamentarian Battistoni with whom he previously had a relationship. Due to a misunderstanding of the secretary Sgarbozzi, Anna is sent to Battistoni's villa, from where he tries to hide her from his rigid wife.

== Cast ==
- Lino Banfi: On. Armando Battistoni
- Janet Agren: Professor Anna Vinci
- Alvaro Vitali: Teo Mezzabotta
- Leo Gullotta: On. Sgarbozzi/sister of Sgarbozzi
- Teo Teocoli: Ferroviere
- Marisa Merlini: Virginia Battistoni
- Giacomo Furia: Cardinale Efisio
- Gigi Reder: Monsignore
- Lory del Santo: Cameriera casa Battistoni
- Jimmy il Fenomeno: Suor Consuelo
- Enzo Andronico: Major Pacetti

== See also ==
- List of Italian films of 1981
