= Legs of Gold =

1958 film

- Directed by: Turi Vasile; Antonio Margheriti
- Written by: Turi Vasile; Antonio Margheriti
- Produced by: Danilo Marcione
- Starring: Totò; Memmo Carotenuto; Rossella Como
- Cinematography: Carlo Bellero
- Edited by: Mario Serandrei
- Music by: Lelio Luttazzi
- Production companies: Film del Centauro; Titanus
- Distributed by: Titanus
- Release date: 1958
- Running time: 109 minutes
- Country: Italy
- Language: Italian

Legs of Gold (Italian: Gambe d'oro) is a 1958 Italian sports film directed by Turi Vasile and Antonio Margheriti and starring Totò, Memmo Carotenuto and Rossella Como.

== Plot ==
The football team of Cerignola is about to advance to Serie C when a recruiter from Milan seeks to buy its two top players. The offer forces the disinterested owner of the team, Baron Luigi Fontana, to make a choice between his own material gain and the harmony of the town.

== Cast ==
- Totò as Baron Luigi Fontana
- Memmo Carotenuto as Armando
- Rossella Como as Carla Fontana
- Scilla Gabel as Gianna
- Paolo Ferrari as Aldo Maggi
- Rosario Borelli as Franco Savelli
- Dolores Palumbo as Emma, moglie di Armando
- Elsa Merlini as Luisa Fontana
- Giampiero Littera as Riccardo
- Turi Pandolfini as Sindaco
- Luigi Pavese as commendatore Renzoni
- Enzo Furlai
- José Jaspe as assistente di Renzoli
- Nino Vingelli as Carmine
- Bruno Carotenuto
- Walter Santesso as Teodoro
- Cristina De Angelis
- Maria Vitale
- Gabriele Ladogana as Peppiniello
- Attilio Martella
- Jimmy il Fenomeno as Cerignola supporter

== Bibliography ==
- Ennio Bìspuri. Totò: principe clown : tutti i film di Totò. Guida Editori, 1997.
