= My Father's Private Secretary =

1976 comedy film

- Directed by: Mariano Laurenti
- Written by: Francesco Milizia
- Produced by: Luciano Martino
- Starring: Maria Rosaria Omaggio; Renzo Montagnani
- Cinematography: Pasquale Rachini
- Edited by: Alberto Moriani
- Music by: Gianni Ferrio
- Release date: 26 December 1976
- Country: Italy
- Language: Italian

My Father's Private Secretary (Italian: La segretaria privata di mio padre) is a 1976 commedia sexy all'italiana directed by Mariano Laurenti and starring Maria Rosaria Omaggio and Renzo Montagnani.

== Plot ==
An unfaithful businessman kowtows to his jealous wife by hiring unattractive secretaries, when a newly hired female employee attracts both his son's and his attention.

== Cast ==
- Maria Rosaria Omaggio as Luisa
- Renzo Montagnani as Armando Ponziani
- Stefano Patrizi as Franco Ponziani
- Anita Strindberg as Ingrid
- Aldo Massasso as Dottor Mingozzi
- Rina Franchetti as Domestica
- Sophia Lombardo as Olivia
- Giuliana Calandra as Ersilia Ponziani
- Enzo Cannavale as Giuseppe
- Alvaro Vitali as Oscar

== Production ==
The film is a loose remake of Goffredo Alessandrini's Telefoni Bianchi film The Private Secretary.

== Release ==
The film was released in Italian cinemas by Titanus on 26 December 1976.

== Reception ==
In Italy, the film was a hit, grossing over 800 million lira. Corriere della Sera film critic Giovanna Grassi described it as a pochade filled with stereotypes, which "depicts women as prostitutes, nymphomaniacs, or sleazy social climbers, and degrades the Italian man to a macchietta [caricature] of his worst flaws".
