= Teo Teocoli =

Italian actor

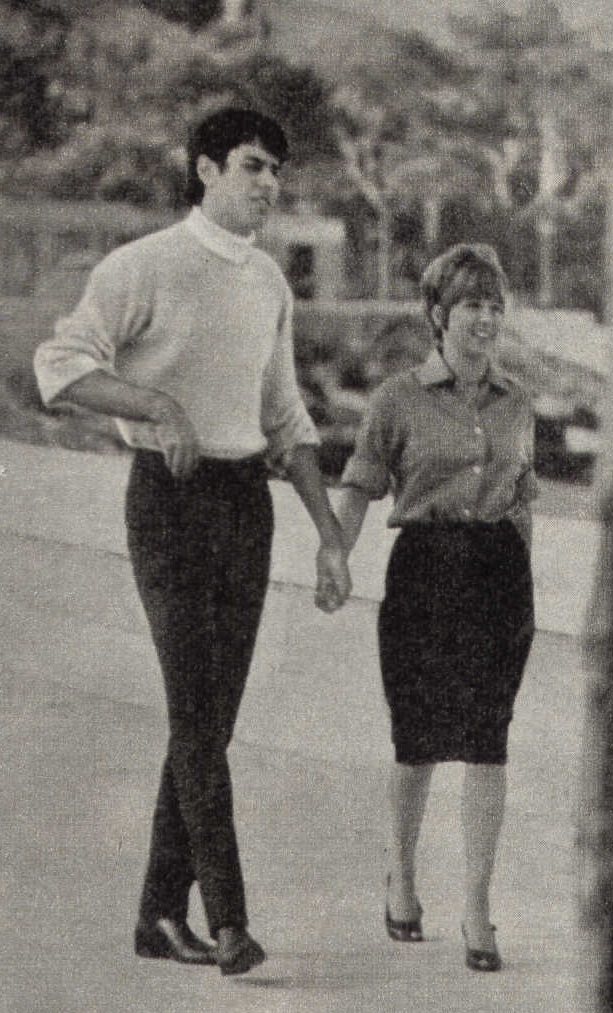
- Born: Antonio Teocoli; 25 February 1945 (age 81); Taranto, Italy
- Occupation: Actor
- Height: 1.86 m (6 ft 1 in)
- Spouse: Elena Facchini (m. 1985)
- Children: 3

Antonio "Teo" Teocoli (born 25 February 1945) is an Italian actor, comedian, cabaret performer, showman, TV conductor, singer and writer appearing in about 30 mostly Italian productions since 1975.

== Selected filmography ==
- Paolo e Francesca (1971)
- The Boss and the Worker (1975)
- L'Italia s'è rotta (1976)
- Sturmtruppen (1976)
- Valentina, una ragazza che ha fretta (1977)
- L'inquilina del piano di sopra (1978)
- Il balordo (1978)
- L'imbranato (1979)
- Saxophone (1979)
- Liquirizia (1979)
- Profumo di classe (1979)
- Ciao marziano (1980)
- L'onorevole con l'amante sotto il letto (1981)
- Spaghetti a mezzanotte (1981)
- Una vacanza bestiale (1981)
- Tutto compreso (1981)
- Si ringrazia la regione Puglia per averci fornito i milanesi (1982)
- Stormtroopers II (1982)
- Eccezzziunale... veramente (1982)
- Drive in (1983)
- Diego al 100% (1984)
- Grand Hotel (1985)
- Grandi magazzini (1986)
- Missione eroica – I pompieri 2 (1987)
- Tutti in palestra (1987)
- My First Forty Years (1987)
- Days of Inspector Ambrosio (1988)
- Abbronzatissimi (1991)
- I tre moschettieri (1991)
- L'odissea (1991)
- Mai dire TV (1991)
- Striscia La Notizia (1991–1992)
- I vicini di casa (1992)
- Croce e delizia (1995)
- Papà dice messa (1996)
- Bibo per sempre (2000)
- Bar Sport (2011)
- I 2 soliti idioti (2012)
- Forever Young (2016)
