= La compagna di banco =

1977 film by Mariano Laurenti

- Italian theatrical release poster
- Directed by: Mariano Laurenti
- Music by: Gianni Ferrio
- Release date: 1977

La compagna di banco is a 1977 commedia sexy all'italiana directed by Mariano Laurenti.

== Cast ==
- Lino Banfi: Teo D'Olivo
- Lilli Carati: Simona Girardi
- Gianfranco D'Angelo: Professor Ilario Cacioppo
- Alvaro Vitali: Salvatore
- Antonio Melidoni: Mario D'Olivo
- Francesca Romana Coluzzi: professoressa Malimonti
- Gigi Ballista: Girardi
- Nikki Gentile: Elena Mancuso
- Paola Maiolini: Vera
- Brigitte Petronio: Mirella
- Giacomo Furia: commissario Acavallo
