= Per una manciata d'oro =

- Directed by: Carlo Veo
- Distributed by: Variety Distribution
- Release date: 1965
- Country: Italy
- Language: Italian

Per una manciata d'oro is a 1965 Italian adventure film.

== Cast ==
- Mario Novelli (credited as Anthony Freeman) as Tarzak
- Brad Euston as Nelson
- Luigi Batzella (credited as Paolo Solvay) as Fred
