= Mario Novelli =

Italian actor

- Born: 26 February 1940; Rome, Italy
- Died: 21 August 2016 (aged 76)
- Occupation: Actor
- Years active: 1962-2016

Mario Novelli (26 February 1940 – 21 August 2016) was an Italian actor. He appeared in more than sixty films from 1962. He died on 21 August 2016.

== Filmography ==
Year	Title	Role	Notes
1962	The Rebel Gladiators	Gladiator	Uncredited
1964	Seven Slaves Against the World		
1964	La vendetta di Spartacus		
1964	The Invincible Brothers Maciste	Maciste the Younger	
1964	Three Swords for Rome	Julio	
1965	Seven Rebel Gladiators	Physios	
1965	Hercules and the Princess of Troy	Botus	TV movie
1965	Per una manciata d'oro	Tarzak	
1966	Texas, Adios	Bounty Hunter	
1966	Star Pilot	Ingegner Paolo Bardi	
1967	Agente Sigma 3 - Missione Goldwather	Joey, Sigma 3's Best Friend	
1967	Two Crosses at Danger Pass	Charlie Moran	
1967	Ballad of a Gunman	Chiuchi	
1967	The Stranger Returns	Austin	
1968	3 Supermen a Tokio		
1969	Fräulein Doktor	Sgt. Otto Latemar	
1969	Ein dreifach Hoch dem Sanitätsgefreiten Neumann	Lt. Romeo	
1969	Ms. Stiletto	Mayer, the Baron's Captain	
1970	A Big Grey-Blue Bird	Herbert	
1970	Rendezvous with Dishonour	Yani	
1971	Uccidi Django... uccidi per primo!!!		
1971	Dead Men Ride	Alan, Redfield Henchman	Uncredited
1971	Beware of a Holy Whore		
1971	Ore di terrore	Josef Daniels	
1971	Kreuzfahrt des Grauens	Osman	
1971	Holy Water Joe	Donovan Henchman	
1972	Caliber 9	Pasquale Talarico	
1972	Un uomo chiamato Dakota	John Lead	
1973	Si può essere più bastardi dell'ispettore Cliff?		
1975	Violent Rome	Lazari	
1975	Syndicate Sadists	Franco	
1975	Faccia di spia	Feltrinelli's Brother	Uncredited
1975	L'arbre de Guernica	Ramiro	
1976	Like Rabid Dogs	Righi	
1976	La lozana andaluza		
1976	The Desert of the Tartars		
1976	Mister Scarface	The Whipman	Uncredited
1976	Liebes Lager		
1976	Fear in the City	Bankrobber	
1976	Hanno ucciso un altro bandito		
1977	California	Brother of northern soldier	
1978	Blazing Flowers	Nosey	
1978	Eyes Behind the Stars	The Silencers Henchman	
1978	Scorticateli vivi	Barney	
1978	The Perfect Crime	Saboteur	
1978	Alessia... un vulcano sotto la pelle	Biagio / farmer	
1979	Play Motel	Receptionist	
1980	La vera storia della monaca di Monza	Molteno	
1982	Nerone e Poppea		
1982	The Secret Nights of Lucrezia Borgia		
1982	The Scorpion with Two Tails	Maria's Bodyguard	
1982	The Sword of the Barbarians	Nantuk	
1982	Vai avanti tu che mi vien da ridere	L'uomo che telefona nella cabina telefonica	
1983	Il trono di fuoco	Barbar	Uncredited
1984	Warriors of the Year 2072	Tango	
1985	Ladyhawke	Fornac's Man	Uncredited
1988	Delta Force Commando		
1989	Afghanistan - The last war bus (L'ultimo bus di guerra)		
1989	Beyond the Door III	Engineer	
1991	Year of the Gun	Gunman	
1995	Ivo the Genius	Operaio ENEL	
1998	Coppia omicida	Miccari	
2000	Alex l'ariete		(final film role)
