= I'm Getting a Yacht =

- Italian theatrical release poster
- Directed by: Sergio Corbucci
- Written by: Ernesto Gastaldi; Mario Amendola; Bruno Corbucci
- Starring: Laura Antonelli; Johnny Dorelli
- Cinematography: Luigi Kuveiller
- Music by: Gianni Ferrio
- Release date: 1980
- Country: Italy
- Language: Italian

I'm Getting a Yacht (Italian: Mi faccio la barca) is a 1980 Italian comedy film directed by Sergio Corbucci.

== Plot ==
Piero is a dentist who lives apart from his wife Roberta. To spend the traditional two weeks of vacation with his children Fiorella and Claudio he decides to buy a boat called Biba, Roberta's nickname, with which to leave Civitavecchia for Sardinia; Roberta also arrives from Milan to board the Kabir, a yacht owned by the engineer Casorati, full of rich snobs including Attilio.

Piero's holiday does not start under the best auspices, the Biba is actually a half-hut, which as soon as it is handed over to him immediately loses the propeller, forcing him to jump into the water to get it back; after a few miles of navigation he is forced to return to Civitavecchia for having damaged the net of a group of fishermen. Finally, having landed on the shores of the Argentario, Roberta, worried about the fate of her children, decides to leave the Kabir and join Piero and the boys on the Biba.

After several hardships, Biba reaches Sardinia and the journey brings Piero and Roberta closer together, but, in Porto Cervo, Piero meets Alessia, his nurse and lover, who asks him to recommend her to a well-known dentist. Piero with an excuse goes to dinner with Alessia, but is discovered by Roberta and, after yet another fight, the two understand that they still love each other and want to get back together.

In the meantime, however, Biba is taking off, Piero and Roberta manage to reach her with a rubber boat, but they will find themselves hostages of two prison escapees, who have taken the boat to go to Corsica. The couple, however, with cunning manage to knock out the two fugitives, but in the meantime the Biba is sunk by Claudio and Fiorella who believed that their parents had been killed by bandits; stranded in the middle of the sea they are saved by Attilio and finally they can start their life together again, perhaps by buying a bigger boat.

== Cast ==
- Johnny Dorelli: Dr. Piero Savelli
- Laura Antonelli: Roberta
- Christian De Sica: Attilio
- Daniela Poggi: Alessia
- Daniele Formica: L'ingegnere
- Franco Giacobini: Evaso
- Sal Borgese: Marò
- Vittorio Musy Glori: Casorati

== See also ==
- List of Italian films of 1980
