= Flatfoot (film) =

- Directed by: Steno
- Screenplay by: Lucio de Caro
- Story by: Luciano Vincenzoni; Nicola Badalucco
- Produced by: Sergio Bonotti
- Starring: Bud Spencer; Adalberto Maria Merli; Raymond Pellegrin; Angelo Infanti
- Cinematography: Silvano Ippoliti
- Edited by: Daniel Alabiso
- Music by: Guido and Maurizio De Angelis
- Production companies: Mondial Televisione Film; C.A.P.A.C.
- Distributed by: Titanus
- Release dates: 25 October 1973 (Italy); 23 July 1975 (Paris)
- Running time: 110 minutes
- Countries: Italy; France
- Box office: ₤2.972 billion

Flatfoot (Italian: Piedone lo sbirro) is a 1973 poliziottesco-comedy film directed by Steno. The film starring Bud Spencer obtained a great commercial success, generated three sequels. It is followed by Flatfoot in Hong Kong, Flatfoot in Africa and Flatfoot in Egypt. The title song is performed by Santo & Johnny.

== Plot summary ==
In Naples the Inspector Rizzo, nicknamed "Flatfoot", defeats a gang of drug traffickers. The criminals, from Marseille, were peddling drugs using frozen fish, but Flatfoot has managed to arrest them, with the help of a boss of the Neapolitan underworld, called Manomozza (snipped hand). After the arrest however, Flatfoot discovers that Manomozza did the double game and now intends to forge an alliance with the traffickers "Marseilles". Flatfoot, thanks to the tip from a friend, finds the place and time of the meeting between drug dealers, subdues them and sends everyone to jail.

== Cast ==
- Bud Spencer: Inspector "Flatfoot" Rizzo
- Adalberto Maria Merli: Police Commissioner Tabassi
- Raymond Pellegrin: Lawyer De Ribbis
- Juliette Mayniel: Maria
- Mario Pilar: Manomozza
- Angelo Infanti: Ferdinando Scarano, "'O Barone"
- Enzo Cannavale: Deputy Inspector Caputo
- Nino Vingelli: Old Man of Camorra

== Production ==
Steno stated, "For better or worse, Flatfoot was a crime flick, and I think that hadn't I directed Execution Squad, producers wouldn't have allowed me to do it."

Flatfoot was shot at Elios Film and Incir - De Paolis in Rome and on location in Naples.

== Release ==
Flatfoot was released theatrically in Italy on 25 October 1973 where it was distributed by Titanus. The film grossed a total of 2.972 billion Italian lira on its release making Flatfoot the first and most commercially successful attempt at mixing the crime genre with comedy.

== Footnotes ==
=== References ===
- Curti, Roberto (2013). Italian Crime Filmography, 1968-1980. McFarland. ISBN 978-0786469765.
