= Turi Vasile =

Italian producer, director, playwright, screenwriter, film critic and author

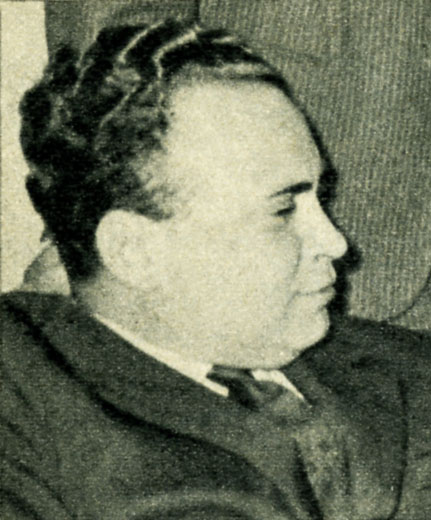
- Vasile in 1956
- Born: 22 March 1922; Messina, Italy
- Died: 1 September 2009 (aged 87); Rome, Italy
- Occupations: Producer; Director

Turi Vasile (22 March 1922 - 1 September 2009) was an Italian producer, director, playwright, screenwriter, film critic and author.

== Life and career ==
Born in Messina, Sicily, Vasile started working as a playwright and a theatre director in the early 1940s. After being assistant of Augusto Genina, starting from the mid-1940s he wrote a number of screenplays for films directed by Mario Camerini, Eduardo De Filippo, Gianni Franciolini and Alessandro Blasetti. From the 1950s Vasile focused into producing, and produced many art films by notable directors such as Federico Fellini, Michelangelo Antonioni, Dino Risi, Luigi Comencini, Antonio Pietrangeli, Franco Brusati. He was also active as a film director, a film critic and an author, and he was president of the National Institute of Ancient Drama.

== Selected filmography ==
- Husband and Wife (1952)
- Legs of Gold (1958)
- The Cats (1968)
- Invasion (1970)
- The Most Gentle Confessions (1971)
