= Gigi Ballista =

Italian actor (1918–1980)

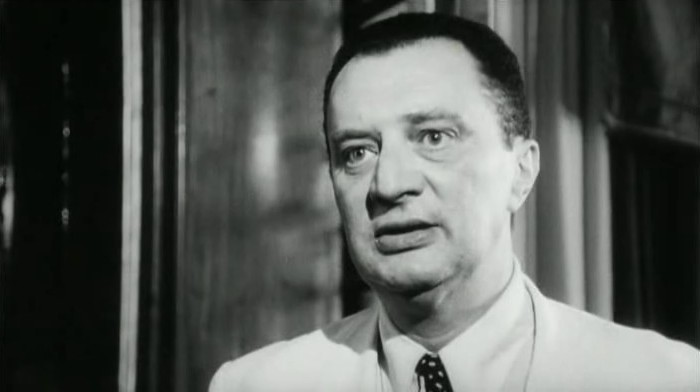
- Gigi Ballista (1966)
- Born: 1 December 1918; Florence, Italy
- Died: 2 August 1980 (aged 61); Rome, Italy
- Occupation: Actor
- Years active: 1961–1980

Gigi Ballista (1 December 1918 – 2 August 1980) was an Italian film and television actor. He appeared in 60 films between 1961 and 1980.

== Life and career ==
Born in Florence, Ballista graduated in law, then he started working as a PR consultant in the field of advertising and industrial documentaries. He debuted as an actor at a mature age in the early 1960s with some minor roles, but his breakout came in 1966 with a role of weight in Pietro Germi's The Birds, the Bees and the Italians.

Following the critical and commercial success of the film, Ballista decided to pursue a professional career as an actor, and he became, mainly thanks to his characteristic hoarse and dysphonic voice, one of the most recognizable character actors in Italian cinema and television.

== Selected filmography ==
- A Day for Lionhearts (1961) - Il frate
- I maniaci (1964) - Count at the party (segment "l'hobby") (uncredited)
- The Dreamer (1965) - Medico
- The Birds, the Bees and the Italians (1966) - Giacinto Castellan
- How I Learned to Love Women (1966) - Sir Archibald
- Pleasant Nights (1966) - Luca di Montemerlo
- Sex Quartet (1966) - The Priest (segment "Fata Marta")
- The Seventh Floor (1967) - Dr. Claretta
- The Climax (1967) - Don Michele
- L'Homme qui trahit la mafia (1967) - Aldo
- Galileo (1968) - Trial Judge
- Torture Me But Kill Me with Kisses (1968) - Engineer
- Emma Hamilton (1968) - Le cardinal Ruffo
- Colpo di sole (1968)
- Fellini Satyricon (1969) - (uncredited)
- The Secret of Santa Vittoria (1969) - Padre Polenta
- Una storia d'amore (1970) - Borgognini
- Kill the Fatted Calf and Roast It (1970) - Il medico
- Lady Caliph (1970) - Il principe industriale
- The Blonde in the Blue Movie (1971) - Commendatore Silvio Borellon
- Roma Bene (1971) - Vitozzi
- Trastevere (1971) - Il conte
- Do Not Commit Adultery (1971) - Padre Spiridone
- Snow Job (1972)
- Beati i ricchi (1972) - Commendatore
- Black Turin (1972) - Marinotti
- House of 1000 Pleasures (1973) - Genie in lamp
- Giovannona Long-Thigh (1973) - Commendatore La Noce
- Crescete e moltiplicatevi (1973) - Dottore
- Blume in Love (1973) - Older Man
- The Lady Has Been Raped (1973) - Carini
- Stregoni di città (1973)
- Brigitte, Laura, Ursula, Monica, Raquel, Litz, Florinda, Barbara, Claudia, e Sofia le chiamo tutte... anima mia (1974)
- Unbelievable Adventures of Italians in Russia (1974) - Dottore
- Fischia il sesso (1974) - Mr. Lewis
- Claretta and Ben (1974) - Gino's Friend
- Stavisky (1974) - Gaston Henriet
- Sesso in testa (1974) - Father of Carletto
- Poker in Bed (1974) - Il commendator Gervasio Caminata
- Policewoman (1974) - L'avvocato
- Piange... il telefono (1975)
- The Family Vice (1975) - The Count
- The Sunday Woman (1975) - Vollero
- Mala, amore e morte (1975) - avv. Carlo Alberto Giorgi
- La banca di Monate (1975) - The Bishop
- Il giustiziere di mezzogiorno (1975) - Direttore Rossetti
- Il fratello (1975)
- La madama (1976) - Il Veneziano
- Confessions of a Lady Cop (1976) - Questore Moretti
- Salon Kitty (1976) - General
- La dottoressa sotto il lenzuolo (1976) - Prof. Ciotti
- Febbre da cavallo (1976) - Conte Dallara
- Un amore targato Forlì (1976)
- Cassiodoro il più duro del pretorio (1976)
- La compagna di banco (1977) - Girardi
- Midnight Express (1978) - Chief Judge
- Liquirizia (1979) - Bartolozzi
- I Hate Blondes (1980) - Psychiatrist
- L'assistente sociale tutto pepe (1981) - Bishop
