= Vincenzo Crocitti =

Italian cinema and television actor

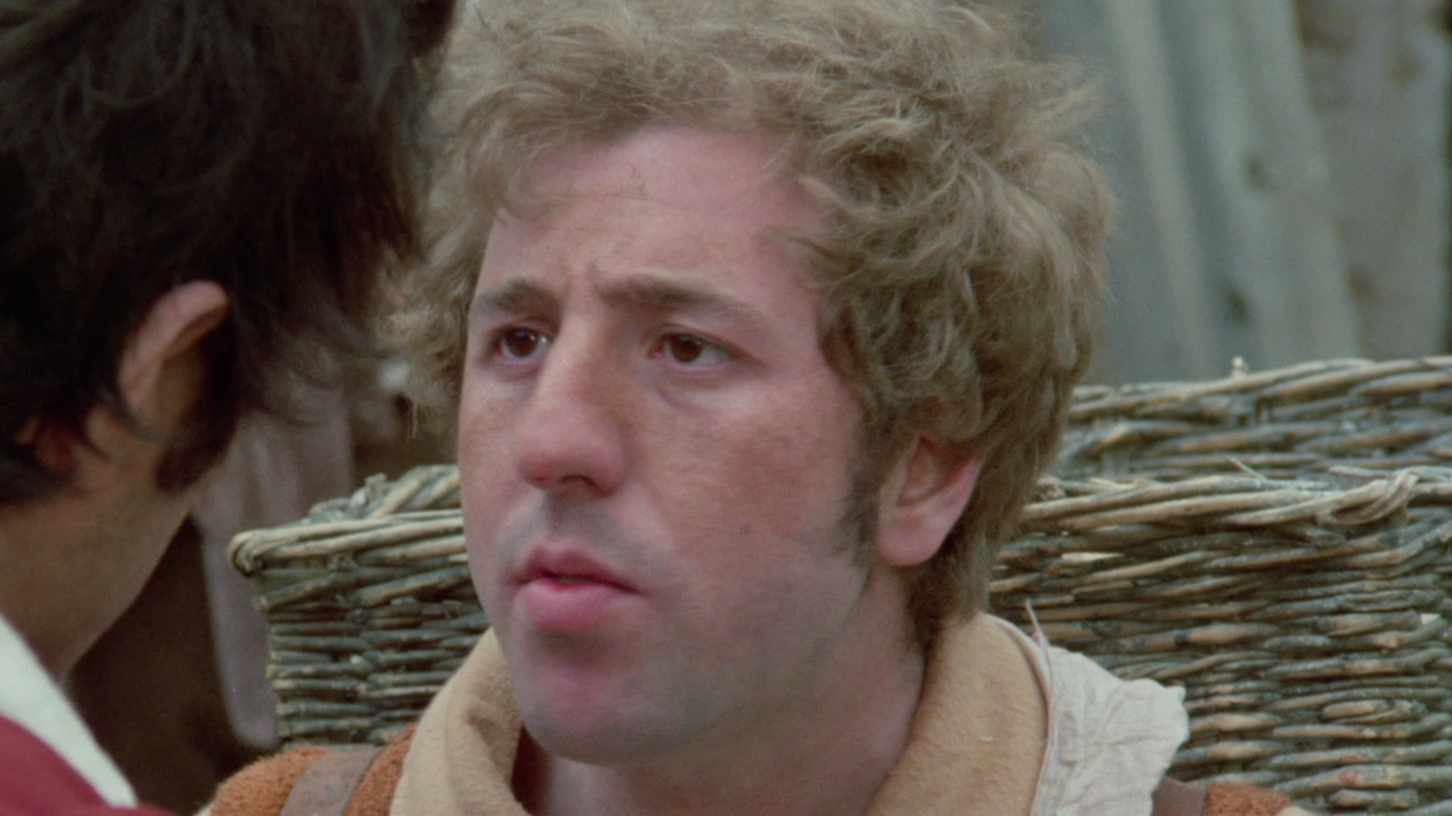
- Born: 16 July 1949; Rome, Italy
- Died: 29 September 2010 (aged 61); Rome, Italy
- Years active: 1967–2010
- Height: 1.68 m (5 ft 6 in)

Vincenzo Crocitti (16 July 1949 – 29 September 2010) was an Italian cinema and television actor. Crocitti was born in Rome. He won a David di Donatello and a Nastro d'Argento for the role of Mario Vivaldi in An Average Little Man.

== Selected filmography ==
- Nel sole (1967) – Pupil
- Roy Colt & Winchester Jack (1970) – Deaf Man
- L'uccello migratore (1972) – Agente Giovanni Nicotera (uncredited)
- Torso (1973) – Delivery man
- Giovannona Long-Thigh (1973) – Train conductor
- Il colonnello Buttiglione (1973) – Lieutenant
- Rugantino (1973) – Burino
- Il colonnello Buttiglione diventa generale (1974)
- The Gamecock (1974) – Elena's 'Whoremaster'
- Come Home and Meet My Wife (1974) – Tizio Maronati
- Il trafficone (1974) – BastianoTaddei
- I sette magnifici cornuti (1974)
- The "Human" Factor (1975) – Lupo's Driver
- Il giustiziere di mezzogiorno (1975) – Trippa
- Sexycop (1976) – Meccanico
- The Cop in Blue Jeans (1976) – The Stuttering Thief
- Amore grande, amore libero (1976)
- The Best (1976)
- An Average Little Man (1977) – Mario Vivaldi
- Melodrammore (1977) – Augusto di Belluogo
- Being Twenty (1978) – Riccetto
- American Fever (1978)
- Midnight Blue (1979) – Mario
- La supplente va in città (1979) – Leo Romiti – the son
- Polvos mágicos (1979) – Paco
- Ciao cialtroni! (1979) – Saro
- Tesoro mio (1979)
- L'affittacamere (1979) – Patient (uncredited)
- Baila guapa (1979)
- The Precarious Bank Teller (1980) – Il ragionere Ciuffini
- Girls Will Be Girls (1980)
- The Week at the Beach (1981) – Tito
- Help Me Dream (1981)
- There is a Ghost in My Bed (1981) – Camillo Fumagalli, Clerk
- Una vacanza del cactus (1981) – Pistilli
- Pierino contro tutti (1981) – Uomo morso da una vipera
- Chaste and Pure (1981) – 'Picci'
- Pierino il fichissimo (1981) – Ernesto
- Il sommergibile più pazzo del mondo (1982) – Giovanni Cassiodoro
- Attila flagello di Dio (1982) – Osvaldo
- Odd Squad (1983) – Soldato Meniconi
- A Proper Scandal (1984) – The Journalist
- Carabinieri si nasce (1985) – Chef
- Ödipussi (1988) – Herr Mancini
- Le finte bionde (1989) – Felice
- Magnificat (1993) – Agnello
- Italia Village (1994)
- Uomini sull'orlo di una crisi di nervi (1995) – Vincenzo
- Ha-Italkim Ba'im (1996)
- L'amico di Wang (1997) – Il tassinaro abusivo
- Il peso dell'aria (2007) – Gianfranco
- La vita è una cosa meravigliosa (2010) – Augusto Rossetti
- A Second Childhood (2010) – Don Nico (final film role)
