= L'affittacamere =

1976 film

- Film poster
- Directed by: Mariano Laurenti
- Written by: Paolo Brigenti; Bruno Corbucci
- Produced by: Galliano Juso
- Starring: Gloria Guida
- Cinematography: Franco Vitale; Federico Zanni
- Edited by: Alberto Moriani
- Music by: Ubaldo Continiello
- Release date: 1976
- Running time: 100 minutes
- Country: Italy
- Language: Italian

L'affittacamere is a 1976 Italian comedy film directed by Mariano Laurenti and starring Gloria Guida.

== Plot ==
Giorgia and Angela Mainardi are two sisters: the first is very beautiful, and the second is fat and has problems with sleepwalking. One day the sisters receive an inheritance from their aunt, a countess in debt, a farmhouse in the countryside near Bologna and decided to turn it into a pension. Over time, many people are invited to the board from Georgia, believing that going to sleep there and paying 50,000 lire per night; they will be "rewarded" very well by the same girl. It spreads as some 'time on board' begins to turn into bad rumors. Worried, the boyfriend of Angela, Lillino, decides to spend one night there to check.

The others also come to judge - Damiani, avid defender of morality, who decide to go and visit the board, but we will go at the same night that his wife and her lover, Anselmo Bresci, have gathered there. That same evening a doctor, Professor Settebeni, tells his wife to go out to buy a new clinic, and will go to retirement. His wife is informed by his nephew that her husband is going into that infamous board and so he decides to go and find him. The judge after checking for good throughout the hotel; finds himself and all people hidden in the bed of a room, including his wife with her lover. The wife of Professor Settebeni, Adele Bazziconi, will fail to find her husband and the others in the bed; because Georgia manages to find a plan that will slow down the doctor's wife. In the meantime, everyone will be able to dress and simulate the sale; which the retired Professor, Settebeni, will turn into clinic.

The sale does not become [however] a simulation as Settebeni really buys the property and gives Giorgia 50 million lire. After this incident, Angela and Lillino get married and move to a big house in Puglia with Giorgia.

From here it is born that "the idea of transforming a house into a pension"; Giorgia will always use the same methods of her to attract customers.

== Cast ==
- Gloria Guida as Giorgia Mainardi
- Lino Banfi as Lillino Scalabrin
- Enzo Cannavale as Ramazzini
- Vittorio Caprioli as onorevole Vincenzi
- Adolfo Celi as judge Damiani
- Giancarlo Dettori as advocate Mandelli
- Fran Fullenwider as Angela
- Giuseppe Pambieri as Anselmo Bresci
- Luciano Salce as Settebeni
- Marilda Donà as Rosaria Damiani
- Giuliana Calandra as Adele Bazziconi
- Dino Emanuelli as the notary
- Vincenzo Crocitti as patient
- Franco D'Adda as the notary's nephew
- Flora Carosello
- Artemio Antonini
- Ettore G. Mattia

== Release ==
Released in Germany as Das Hotel der heißen Teens.

== Reception ==
Marco Giusti calls the film a weakish "porno-pochade" despite Laurenti's involvement, and sees the story's setting as its main problem. Giusti still praises Gloria Guida's shower scene ("grandissima").

== Bibliography ==
- Giusti, Marco (1999). dizionario dei film italiani STRACULT [sic]. Cles: Sterling & Kupfer. ISBN 88-200-2919-7.

== See also ==
- List of Italian films of 1976
