= Giovannona Long-Thigh =

1973 film by Sergio Martino

- Directed by: Sergio Martino
- Starring: Edwige Fenech; Pippo Franco
- Cinematography: Stelvio Massi
- Music by: Guido & Maurizio De Angelis
- Release date: 1973
- Running time: 94 minutes
- Country: Italy
- Language: Italian

Giovannona Coscialunga disonorata con onore (literally "Joanna Longthigh, honorably dishonored", internationally released as Giovannona Long-Thigh) is a 1973 commedia sexy all'italiana directed by Sergio Martino. The film reteams the two main actors of the 1972 film Quel gran pezzo dell'Ubalda tutta nuda e tutta calda and, as with the previous film, it was very successful commercially. The original title reprises Lina Wertmüller's Mimì metallurgico ferito nell'onore.

== Plot ==
When a newly appointed judge shuts down a cheese factory for pollution violations, its owner, La Noce, bribes a monsignor to fix the problem. He discovers the judge has a liking for other men's wives. La Noce sends his assistant, Albertini, to hire a woman to pretend to be La Noce's wife. Albertini finds Cocò, a virginal-looking prostitute with a dirty mouth. The girl's train ride from Rome to Sicily is filled with mix-ups but they hope that once she's in Sicily, La Noce's plan to compromise the judge will succeed. All the characters come together to create a comedic storyline … La Noce, his real wife, the whore, her pimp, Albertini, the judge, his wife, and his jealous secretary.

== Cast ==
- Edwige Fenech: Giovannona "Cocò" Coscialunga
- Pippo Franco: Ragionier Mario Albertini
- Vittorio Caprioli: Onorevole Pedicò
- Gigi Ballista: Commendatore La Noce
- Riccardo Garrone: Robertuzzo
- Francesca Romana Coluzzi: Mary
- Vincenzo Crocitti: Conducente del treno
- Nello Pazzafini: Franceschino
- Gino Pagnani: Hearse Driver helping Albertini
- Danika La Loggia: Signora La Noce
- Patrizia Adiutori: Luisella
