= Francesca Romana Coluzzi =

Italian actress (1943–2009)

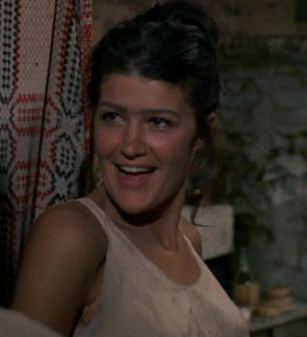
- Coluzzi in Serafino (1968)
- Born: 20 May 1943; Tirana, Albania
- Died: 15 July 2009 (aged 66); Rome, Italy
- Occupation: Actress
- Years active: 1965–2005

Francesca Romana Coluzzi (20 May 1943 – 15 July 2009) was an Italian actress. A respected dramatic actress on stage, she is probably best known for her roles in the commedia sexy all'italiana.

== Life and career ==
Born in Tirana, Albania, of Italian parents, Coluzzi soon moved to Italy with her family to Perugia.

As a teenager, during a student twist dancing contest, Federico Fellini noticed her and offered her a role in 8½. Coluzzi declined the offer to continue her studies, but however the encounter with Fellini marked her life, and she eventually decided to leave the university to pursue a career in the cinema.

She started her career as a body double, first of Mylène Demongeot in Fantômas and later of Marisa Mell in Danger: Diabolik. In 1965, at 22, Coluzzi made her acting debut in the Lucio Fulci's comedy film 002 Operazione Luna.

Her breakout role came in 1969, with the role of Asmara, the Adriano Celentano's lover in Pietro Germi's Serafino. One year later she played Tarsilla Tettamanzi in Alberto Lattuada's Come Have Coffee with Us, and for this role she won a Nastro d'Argento for Best Supporting Actress and a Globo d'oro in the same category. In the following years Coluzzi was mainly active in comedy films, especially in the commedia sexy all'italiana genre, often playing roles of unbearable and jealous wives. In 1985, she founded in Rome a theater workshop for children, Associazione Culturale Minestrone d'Arte. She died at 66 of lung cancer.

== Selected filmography ==
- 002 Operazione Luna (1965)
- The Two Parachutists (1965)
- Will Our Heroes Be Able to Find Their Friend Who Has Mysteriously Disappeared in Africa? (1968)
- Code Name: Red Roses (1968)
- Serafino (1968)
- Come Have Coffee with Us (1970)
- We Are All in Temporary Liberty (1971)
- Sting of the West (1972)
- Lover of the Great Bear (1972)
- The Italian Connection (1972)
- Il sergente Rompiglioni (1973)
- Themroc (1973)
- Giovannona Long-Thigh (1973)
- The Cousin (1974)
- The School Teacher (1975)
- The Boss and the Worker (1975)
- Sins Without Intentions (1975)
- Dracula in the Provinces (1975)
- La portiera nuda (1976)
- La compagna di banco (1977)
- In the Highest of Skies (1977)
- L'insegnante balla... con tutta la classe (1978)
- L'insegnante al mare con tutta la classe (1979)
- Night Nurse (1979)
- Pierino contro tutti (1981)
- The Week at the Beach (1981)
- Bollenti spiriti (1981)
- Champagne in paradiso (1983)
- The Last Days of Pompeii (1984)
- Red Sonja (1985)
- Banzai (1997)
- Midsummer Night's Dance (1999)
