= Barbara Magnolfi =

Franco-Italian actress

- Born: Rennes, France
- Occupations: Actress; producer
- Years active: 1975–present
- Spouse: Marc Porel (m. 1977; died 1983)

Barbara Magnolfi is a French-Italian actress. She appeared in more than thirty films and three TV series since 1975

== Selected filmography ==
Year	Film	Role
2019	Deathcember	Ilse
1985	Cut and Run	Rita
1978	Blazing Flowers	Teresa
1978	The Sister of Ursula	Ursula Beyne
1977	Ready for Anything	Paola
1977	Suspiria	Olga
1975	The Suspicious Death of a Minor	Floriana
