= Savage Breed =

1980 film

- Film poster
- Directed by: Pasquale Squitieri
- Written by: Ennio De Concini; Pasquale Squitieri
- Produced by: Luigi Borghese
- Starring: Saverio Marconi
- Cinematography: Giulio Albonico
- Music by: Tullio De Piscopo
- Release date: 13 September 1980
- Running time: 106 minutes
- Country: Italy
- Language: Italian

Savage Breed (Italian: Razza selvaggia) is a 1980 Italian drama film directed by Pasquale Squitieri. It was entered into the 12th Moscow International Film Festival.

== Cast ==
- Saverio Marconi as Mario Gargiulo
- Stefano Madia as Umberto Saraceni
- Imma Piro as Michelina
- Simona Mariani as Anna Saraceni
- Enzo Cannavale as Don Peppino
- Cristina Donadio as Giuliana
- Angelo Infanti as Carlo Esposito
- Victoria Zinny
- Manuel Laghi
- Geoffrey Copleston
