= Flatfoot in Egypt =

Piedone d'Egitto (Flatfoot in Egypt)
- Directed by: Steno
- Written by: Massimo Franciosa; Adriano Bolzoni; Steno
- Starring: Bud Spencer; Enzo Cannavale; Angelo Infanti
- Cinematography: Luigi Kuveiller
- Edited by: Mario Morra
- Music by: Guido & Maurizio De Angelis
- Production company: Merope Film
- Distributed by: Titanus; Medusa Film
- Release date: 1980
- Running time: 103 minutes
- Country: Italy
- Language: Italian

Piedone d'Egitto (internationally released as Flatfoot in Egypt and Flatfoot on the Nile) is a 1980 Italian "poliziottesco"-comedy film directed by Steno and starring Bud Spencer. It is the fourth and last chapter in the "Flatfoot" film series. It is preceded by Flatfoot, Flatfoot in Hong Kong and Flatfoot in Africa. It was the most popular film released in Hungary in 1981, with over 3 million admissions.

== Plot ==
The Neapolitan Commissioner Rizzo, also known as "Flatfoot", leaves for Egypt to search for a major Italian scientist who has disappeared. The scientist was doing a research on the oil fields in Egypt when a gang of criminals kidnapped him. Now Flatfoot must find him.

== Cast ==
- Bud Spencer as Insp. "Flatfoot" Rizzo
- Enzo Cannavale as Caputo
- Baldwin Dakile as Bodo
- Robert Loggia as Edward Burns
- Angelo Infanti as Hassan
- Cinzia Monreale as Connie Burns
- Leopoldo Trieste as Professor Cerullo
- Karl-Otto Alberty as The Swede
- Adel Adham as Elver Zakar
- Mahmoud Kabil as Lt. Kebir
- Riccardo Pizzuti as Salvatore Coppola
- Giovanni Cianfriglia
- Percy Hogan
