= Scusi lei è normale? =

1979 film by Umberto Lenzi

- Directed by: Umberto Lenzi
- Written by: Carlo Gentili
- Story by: Umberto Lenzi; Dardano Sacchetti
- Starring: Renzo Montagnani; Ray Lovelock; Anna Maria Rizzoli
- Cinematography: Guglielmo Mancori
- Edited by: Eugenio Alabiso
- Music by: Franco Micalizzi
- Distributed by: Variety Distribution
- Release date: 1979
- Running time: 90 minutes
- Language: Italian

Scusi lei è normale? (i.e. "Pardon Me, Are You Normal?") is a 1979 commedia sexy all'italiana directed by Umberto Lenzi and starring Renzo Montagnani, Ray Lovelock and Anna Maria Rizzoli.

== Cast ==
- Renzo Montagnani as Gustavo Sparvieri
- Anna Maria Rizzoli as Anna Grisaglia
- Ray Lovelock as Franco Astuti
- Aldo Maccione as Police Commissioner Aldo Lo Curcio
- Enzo Cerusico as Nicola Proietti/Nicolè
- Marco Tulli as Grisaglia
- Luca Sportelli as Friar Martino
- Tom Felleghy as Pharmacist
- Sammy Barbot

== See also ==
- List of Italian films of 1979
