= Girls Will Be Girls (1980 film) =

1980 film by Mariano Laurenti

- Directed by: Mariano Laurenti
- Written by: Gianfranco D'Angelo; Mariano Laurenti; Franco Mercuri
- Starring: Anna Maria Rizzoli
- Cinematography: Maurizio Maggi
- Edited by: Alberto Moriani
- Music by: Gianni Ferrio
- Distributed by: Titanus
- Release date: August 22, 1980
- Country: Italy
- Language: Italian

Girls Will Be Girls (Italian: La settimana bianca) is a 1980 Italian commedia sexy all'italiana directed by Mariano Laurenti.

== Plot ==
A group of employees, on a winter vacation (in Italian Settimana Bianca), rather than skiing, spend their time in an attempt to impress the beautiful Angela and a sexy servant girl.

== Cast ==
- Annamaria Rizzoli as Angela Marconcini
- Gianfranco D'Angelo as Piergallini
- Enzo Cannavale as Enzo Ercolani
- Bombolo as G. Cesare
- Jimmy il Fenomeno as spinster
- Carmen Russo as sexy maid
- Vincenzo Crocitti as Tarcisi
- Giacomo Furia as Cavalier Pasquarelli
- Paolo Giusti as Fabio
- Sal Borgese as Sardo
- Franca Mantelli as Matilde Marconcini
- Renzo Ozzano as Bruno Bartocci
- Gianluca Manunza as Tonino
- Graziella Polesinanti as Mr. Ercolani

== See also ==
- List of Italian films of 1980
