= La ripetente fa l'occhietto al preside =

1980 film by Mariano Laurenti

- Italian theatrical release poster by Enzo Sciotti
- Directed by: Mariano Laurenti
- Written by: Mariano Laurenti; Francesco Milizia
- Produced by: Luciano Martino
- Starring: Anna Maria Rizzoli; Lino Banfi
- Cinematography: Federico Zanni
- Music by: Gianni Ferrio
- Release date: 14 August 1980
- Language: Italian

La ripetente fa l'occhietto al preside (The repeating student winked at the principal) is a 1980 Italian commedia sexy all'italiana film directed by Mariano Laurenti.

== Plot ==
The film is set in Italy in 1980. After some breaks, Angela Pastorelli, daughter of a wealthy industrialist, resumes her interrupted studies. Among her classmates is the handsome Carlo Lucignani whom the girl becomes interested in. However, Carlo has been forbidden by his father, an employee of the Pastorelli family, to date Angela.

== Cast ==
- Anna Maria Rizzoli: Angela Pastorelli
- Lino Banfi: Principal Rodolfo Calabrone
- Loredana Martinez: Lisetta
- Alvaro Vitali: Professor Beccafico
- Carlo Sposito: Don Evaristo
- Ria De Simone: professoressa Monica Zappa
- Leo Colonna: Carlo
- Walter Valdi: father of Carlo
- Chris Avram: Pastorelli

== See also ==
- List of Italian films of 1980
