= Love in First Class =

- Directed by: Salvatore Samperi
- Written by: Giorgio Basile; Gianfranco Manfredi; Salvatore Samperi
- Produced by: Fulvio Lucisano
- Starring: Enrico Montesano; Sylvia Kristel
- Cinematography: Camillo Bazzoni
- Edited by: Sergio Montanari
- Music by: Paolo Conte; Roberto Colombo; Gianfranco Manfredi
- Release date: 1980
- Language: Italian
- Box office: 79,738 admissions (France)

Love in First Class (Italian: Un amore in prima classe) is a 1980 Italian romantic comedy film co-written and directed by Salvatore Samperi.

== Cast ==
- Enrico Montesano: Carmelo
- Sylvia Kristel: Beatrice
- Lorenzo Aiello: Malcolm
- Franca Valeri: Signora Della Rosa
- Felice Andreasi: Oscar Della Rosa
- Memmo Carotenuto: Vecchio ferroviere cieco
- Sergio Di Pinto: Bipo
- Gianfranco Manfredi: Controllore
- Enzo Cannavale: Prete
- Luc Merenda: Poliziotto
- Christian De Sica: Venditore in stazione
- Adriana Russo
