= Gianni Ferrio =

Italian composer (1924–2013)

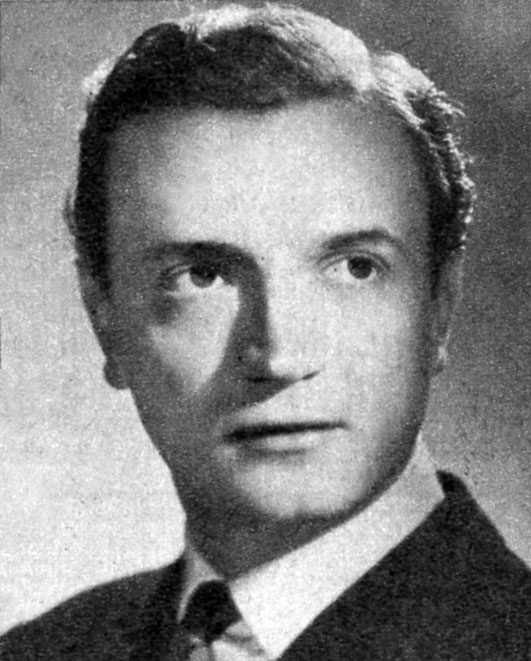
- Born: 16 November 1924; Vicenza, Italy.
- Died: 21 October 2013 (aged 88); Rome, Italy
- Occupations: composer, conductor and music arranger
- Spouse: Alba Arnova

Gianni Ferrio (16 November 1924 – 21 October 2013) was an Italian composer, conductor and music arranger.

== Life and career ==
Born in Vicenza, Ferrio studied at the conservatories of Vicenza and Venice. Starting in the late 1950s, he was active as a composer of film scores. He composed some 120 soundtracks, mostly for Spaghetti Westerns and commedie sexy all'italiana films. His piece "One Silver Dollar", the main theme to Giorgio Ferroni's Blood for a Silver Dollar (1965), was later included in the soundtrack of Quentin Tarantino's Inglourious Basterds. Ferrio is also well known for his work in pop music, particularly for his collaboration with Mina, for whom he composed hit songs such as "Parole parole" and wrote arrangements and orchestrations for many songs and albums. The last collaboration with Mina was on her 2012 album 12 (American Song Book), for which Ferrio provided the string arrangements.

Ferrio served as conductor for the Sanremo Music Festival in 1959 and 1962, for the Eurovision Song Contest 1965, and for several Italian TV shows.

Ferrio was married to ballerina and film actress Alba Arnova.

He died on October 21, 2013 in Rome, Lazio, Italy.

== Selected filmography ==
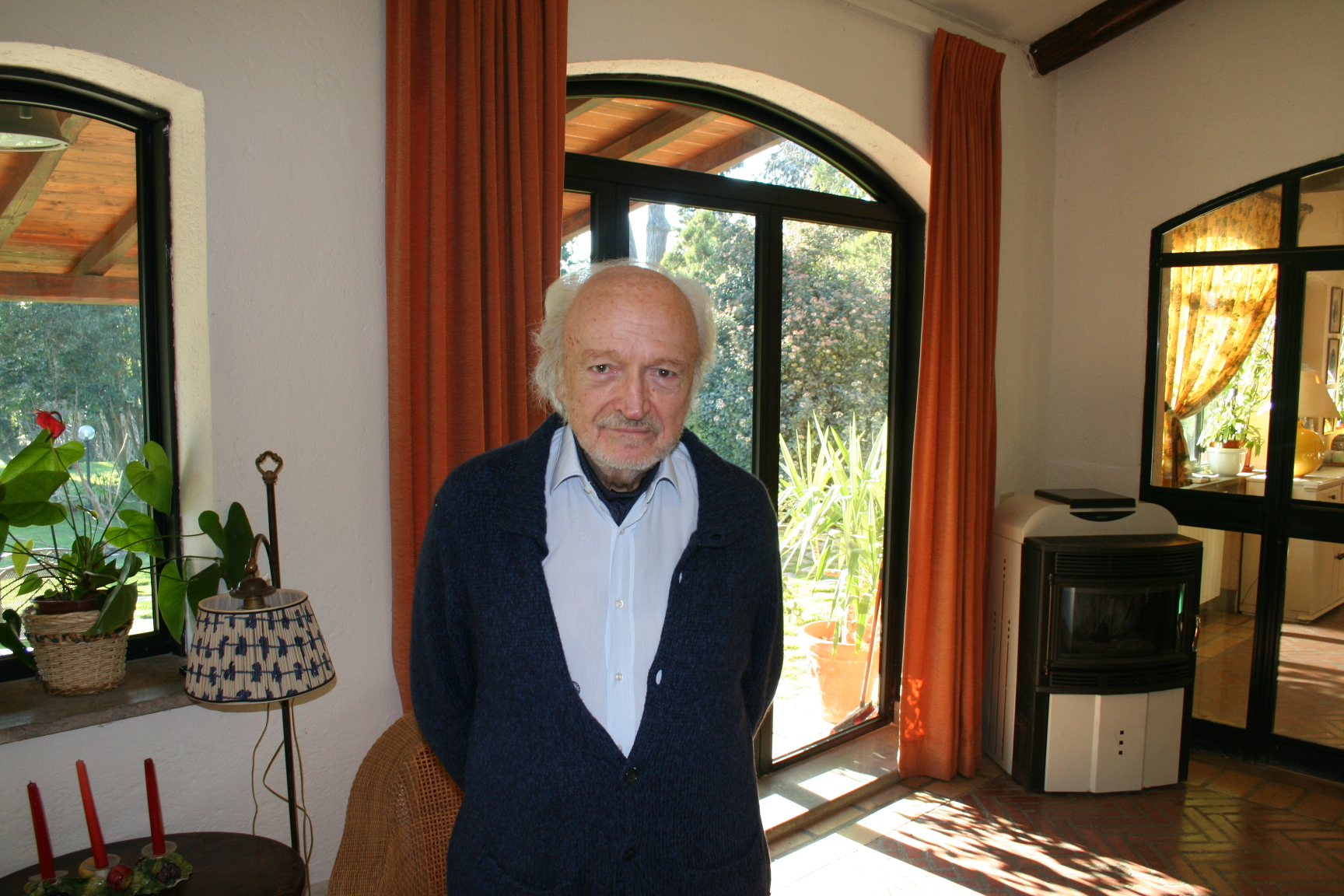
Gianni Ferrio (2008)

- Who Hesitates Is Lost (1960)
- Toto, Fabrizi and the Young People Today (1960)
- A Dollar Of Fear (1960)
- Gentlemen Are Born (1960)
- Hercules in the Valley of Woe (1961)
- 5 marines per 100 ragazze (1961)
- Appuntamento in Riviera (1962)
- The Two Colonels (1963)
- Obiettivo ragazze (1963)
- The Four Musketeers (1963)
- Heroes of the West (1963)
- Blood for a Silver Dollar (1965)
- Three Dollars of Lead (1965)
- Johnny Golden Poker (1966)
- Fort Yuma Gold (1966)
- The Tough One (1966)
- Danger!! Death Ray (1967)
- The Sweet Sins of Sexy Susan (1967)
- Wanted (1967)
- The Dirty Outlaws (1967)
- Death Sentence (1968)
- Find a Place to Die (1968)
- Sexy Susan Sins Again (1968)
- Why Did I Ever Say Yes Twice? (1969)
- Sundance and the Kid (1969)
- House of Pleasure (1969)
- A Man for Emmanuelle (1969)
- A Bullet for Sandoval (1969)
- A Man Called Sledge (1970)
- Rendezvous with Dishonour (1970)
- Death Occurred Last Night (1970)
- Reverend's Colt (1970)
- The Bloodstained Butterfly (1971)
- Long Live Your Death (1971)
- Long Live Robin Hood (1971)
- Alta tensión (1972)
- Fasthand (1972)
- Death Walks at Midnight (1972)
- Tony Arzenta (1973)
- La isla misteriosa y el capitán Nemo (1973)
- The Gamecock (1974)
- Puzzle (1974)
- Policewoman (1974)
- The Boss and the Worker (1975)
- Classe mista (1976)
- My Father's Private Secretary (1976)
- Per amore di Poppea (1977)
- La compagna di banco (1977)
- California (1977)
- The Schoolteacher Goes to Boys' High (1978)
- Blazing Flowers (1978)
- La liceale nella classe dei ripetenti (1978)
- How to Lose a Wife and Find a Lover (1978)
- Swept Away by Family Affection (1978)
- How to Seduce Your Teacher (1979)
- Tutti a squola (1979)
- The Nurse in the Military Madhouse (1979)
- La ripetente fa l'occhietto al preside (1980)
- I Don't Understand You Anymore (1980)
- I'm Getting a Yacht (1980)
- Girls Will Be Girls (1980)
- The Week at the Beach (1981)
- L'onorevole con l'amante sotto il letto (1981)
- Una vacanza del cactus (1981)
- Delitto passionale (1994)
- Look Who's Back (2015)

Preceded by (Denmark) Kai Mortensen	Eurovision Song Contest conductor 1965	Succeeded by (Luxembourg) Jean Roderès
