= Anna Maria Rizzoli =

Italian actress (born 1951)

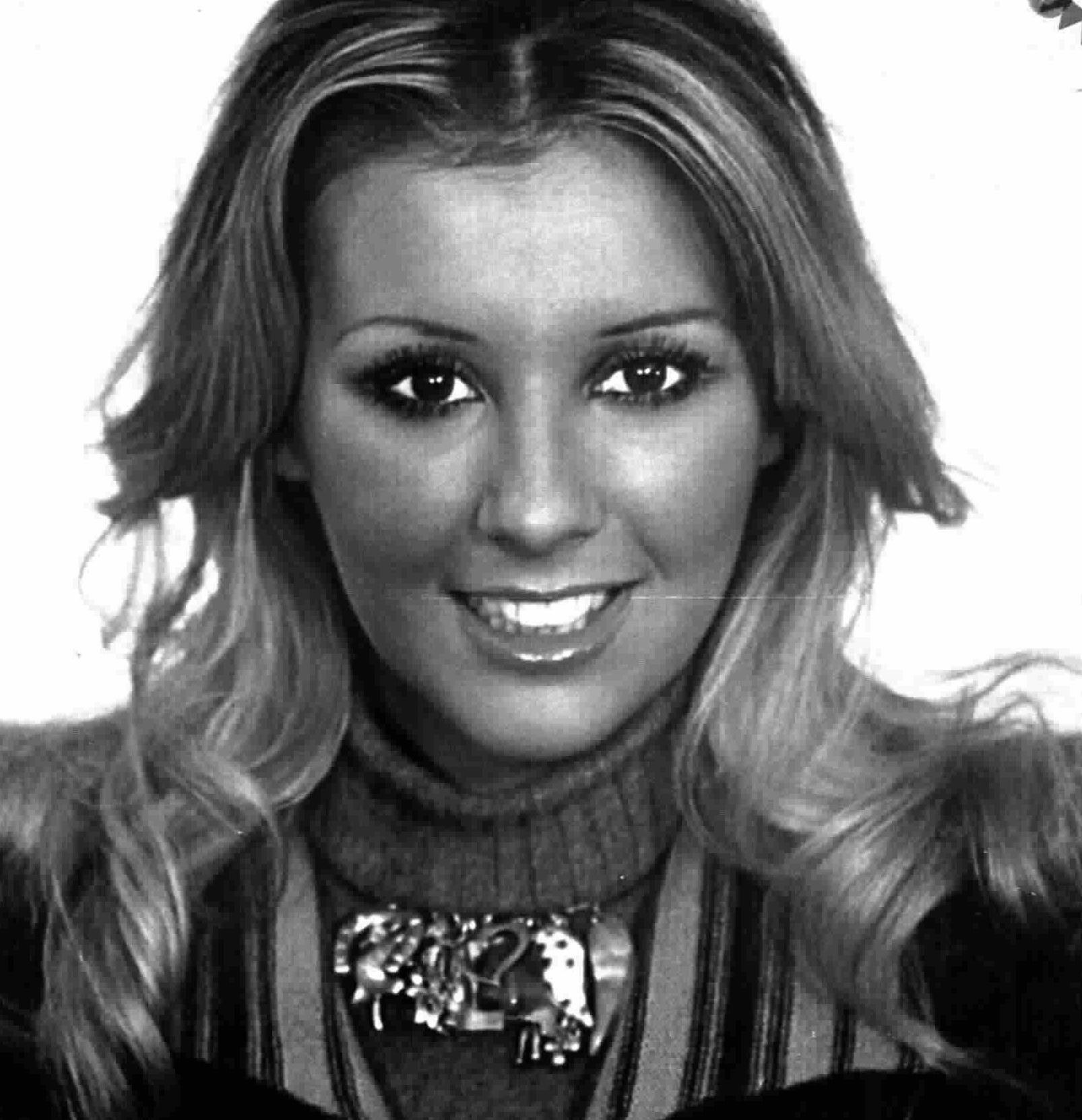
- Born: 26 August 1951 (age 74); Rome, Italy
- Occupation: Actress

Anna Maria Rizzoli (born 26 August 1951) is an Italian actress.

Rizzoli started her career as glamour model and in the second half of the 1970s entered the cinema industry, becoming a star of the commedia sexy all'italiana. She also worked in television, appearing in several TV-series and hosting some shows, including the 1979 Sanremo Music Festival, and on stage where she worked with Giorgio Strehler.

== Partial filmography ==
- Sins Within the Family (1975) - The Girl taking Milo by car (uncredited)
- The Boss and the Worker (1976)
- Ride bene... chi ride ultimo (1977) - Domizia Benti-Contini (segment "Prete per forza")
- Blazing Flowers (1978) - Nadina / Fiorella
- Where Are You Going on Holiday? (1978) - Margherita (segment "Sì buana")
- Scusi lei è normale? (1979) - Anna Maria Immacolata Grisaglia
- Riavanti... Marsch! (1979) - Immacolata-Francesco's Wife
- Play Motel (1979) - Patrizia
- The Precarious Bank Teller (1980) - Vanna
- L'insegnante al mare con tutta la classe (1980) - Lisa Colombi
- La cameriera seduce i villeggianti (1980) - Marina - la moglie di Orazio
- La ripetente fa l'occhietto al preside (1980) - Angela Pastorelli
- Girls Will Be Girls (1980) - Angela Marconcini
- Arabella (1980, TV Mini-Series) - Olimpia Rosier
- La compagna di viaggio (1980) - Lilly
- The Week at the Beach (1981) - Angela Marconcini
- Uno contro l'altro, praticamente amici (1981) - Silvana
- Una vacanza del cactus (1981) - Angela
- I ragazzi di celluloide (1981, TV Mini-Series) - Marilde
- Attenti a quei P2 (1982) - Madame J. De Groschild / Marisa Pappalardo
- Il sommergibile più pazzo del mondo (1982) - Angela
- La sai l'ultima sui matti? (1982) - Vanessa Lelli, dottoressa
- Le Bourreau des cœurs (1983) - Ginette (final film role)
