= The Nurse in the Military Madhouse =

1979 film by Mariano Laurenti

- Italian theatrical release poster
- Directed by: Mariano Laurenti
- Cinematography: Federico Zanni
- Music by: Gianni Ferrio
- Release date: 1979
- Running time: 89 min.
- Country: Italy
- Language: Italian

L'infermiera nella corsia dei militari, internationally released as The Nurse in the Military Madhouse, is a 1979 commedia sexy all'italiana directed by Mariano Laurenti.

== Plot ==
Grazia Mancini is an aspiring night club singer. Her boss Eva has a lover, John who is a trafficker of stolen artworks. The two learn of valuable paintings hidden in a military mental asylum managed by mentally unstable Professor Amedeo Larussa. They blackmail Grazia and send her to the mental asylum in the guise of a substitute nurse to learn the whereabouts of the paintings.

== Cast ==
- Nadia Cassini as Grazia Mancini
- Lino Banfi as Professor Amedeo Larussa
- Alvaro Vitali as Peppino de Tappis
- Karin Schubert as Eva
- Susan Scott as Veronica Larussa
- Lucio Montanaro as Michele
- Renato Cortesi as Ugolini (who believes himself to be Erwin Rommel)
- Carlo Sposito as Michele (who believes himself to be Moshe Dayan)
- Gino Pagnani as Ottavio
- Ermelinda De Felice as Sister Fulgenzia
- Enzo Andronico as Cav. Galeazzo Gedeoni
- Luigi Uzzo as Gustavo
- Elio Zamuto as John, Eva's lover
- Carmen Russo as model
