= L'insegnante al mare con tutta la classe =

1980 film by Michele Massimo Tarantini

- Directed by: Michele Massimo Tarantini
- Produced by: Luciano Martino
- Music by: Franco Campanino
- Release date: 1980
- Country: Italy
- Language: Italian

L'insegnante al mare con tutta la classe (The teacher at the beach with the whole class) is a 1980 Italian commedia sexy all'italiana directed by Michele Massimo Tarantini.

== Cast ==
- Anna Maria Rizzoli: prof. Lisa Colombi
- Lino Banfi: commendator Ercole Cubetti
- Francesca Romana Coluzzi: Enrichetta Cubetti
- Marco Gelardini: Mario Cubetti
- Alvaro Vitali: Cocò
- Franco Diogene: Paolo
- Gisella Sofio: wife of Paolo
