= Franco Caracciolo =

Italian conductor (1920–1999)

- Franco Caracciolo (photo with dedication)
- Occupation: conductor

Franco Caracciolo (29 March 1920 – 28 September 1999) was an Italian conductor.

== Life ==
He was born in Bari in 1920. He studied piano and composing at the Conservatoire of S. Pietro a Majella in Naples, and conducting at the Accademia di Santa Cecilia in Rome.

== Career ==
He toured widely as a concert and opera conductor, was leading conductor of the Scarlatti Orchestra of Naples from 1949 to 1964 and became the permanent conductor of the Sinfonica di Milano Orchestra of Radiotelevisione Italiana. His repertory ranged from baroque to contemporary, including operas by Cherubini, Cimarosa, Haydn, Paisiello, and Scarlatti, and 20th century works by Darius Milhaud, Riccardo Malipiero, Nino Rota, and Gino Marinuzzi. He retired in 1987.

== Main positions held ==
- 1944–5 Conductor of the Amici della Musica SO in Bari.
- 1949–64 Conductor of Alessandro Scarlatti Orchestra, Naples.
- 1964 to 1971 Conducted the Radio Orchestra of Milan.
- 1971–87 Second period as conductor of Alessandro Scarlatti Orchestra, Naples.
