= Enzo Cannavale =

Italian actor (1928–2011)

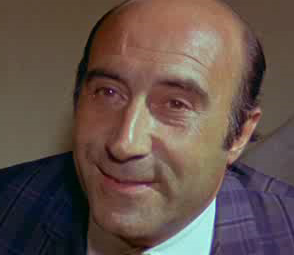
- Cannavale in La liceale (1975)
- Born: Vincenzo Cannavale; 5 April 1928; Castellammare di Stabia, Campania, Italy
- Died: 18 March 2011 (aged 82); Naples, Campania, Italy
- Occupation: Actor
- Years active: 1949–2011
- Height: 1.58 m (5 ft 2 in)
- Relatives: Bobby Cannavale (nephew); Jake Cannavale (grandnephew)

Vincenzo "Enzo" Cannavale (5 April 1928 – 18 March 2011) was an Italian film actor. He appeared in more than 100 films since 1949, including Cinema Paradiso, which won the Academy Award for Best Foreign Language Film at the 62nd Academy Awards in 1990. He was awarded the Nastro d’Argento for Best Supporting Actor in 32 dicembre (December 32nd) by Luciano De Crescenzo.

== Selected filmography ==
- Yvonne of the Night (1949) - Il maggiordomo (uncredited)
- Sogno di una notte di mezza sbornia (1959) - Fish-monger
- Leoni al sole (1961) - Il commissario
- The Four Days of Naples (1962) - Partigiano (uncredited)
- Treasure of San Gennaro (1966) - Gaetano
- More Than a Miracle (1967)
- Stasera mi butto (1967) - Waiter
- Chimera (1968) - Porter in Capocabana Hotel
- Operazione ricchezza (1968)
- Zum zum zum - La canzone che mi passa per la testa (1969) - Filippo - Brother of Tosca
- Zum zum zum n° 2 (1969) - Valerio
- Il suo nome è Donna Rosa (1969) - Gennarino
- Mezzanotte d'amore (1970) - Gennarino
- Cose di Cosa Nostra (1971) - Priest
- Between Miracles (1971) - Paziente 'sano' della clinica
- Faccia da schiaffi (1971)
- Il furto è l'anima del commercio!?... (1971) - Mortaretto
- Roma Bene (1971) - Tognon
- Trastevere (1971) - Straccaletto
- White Sister (1972) - Quinto
- Gang War in Naples (1972) - Nicola Cafiero - 'Sciancato'
- Alfredo, Alfredo (1972) - Alfredo's Lawyer
- The Adventures of Pinocchio (1972, TV Mini-Series) - Oste
- Flatfoot (1973) - Deputy Inspector Caputo
- Sgarro alla camorra (1973) - Vincenzo
- Poker in Bed (1974) - Peppino
- Il domestico (1974) - Salvatore Sperato
- Il trafficone (1974) - Gennarino
- Professore venga accompagnato dai suoi genitori (1974) - School caretaker
- Flatfoot in Hong Kong (1975) - Inspector Caputo
- The School Teacher (1975) - Peppino
- Vergine e di nome Maria (1975) - Simone
- Teasers (1975) - Osvaldo
- Eye of the Cat (1975) - Lolò
- Quel movimento che mi piace tanto (1976) - Salvatore Siniscalchi
- Soldier of Fortune (1976) - Bracalone da Napoli
- My Father's Private Secretary (1976) - Giuseppe
- Taxi Girl (1977) - Commissario Angelini
- A Man Called Magnum (1977) - Sergeant Nicola Capece
- Orazi e curiazi 3-2 (1977) - Sempronio
- Cara sposa (1977) - Salomone
- Flatfoot in Africa (1978) - Caputo
- Little Italy (1978) - Salvatore
- How to Lose a Wife and Find a Lover (1978) - The Guru
- L'inquilina del piano di sopra (1978) - Gennaro
- Gegè Bellavita (1978) - Gennarino's Friend
- L'anello matrimoniale (1979) - Ernesto
- The Gang That Sold America (1979) - Salvatore Esposito
- The Face with Two Left Feet (1979) - Caruso
- Liquirizia (1979) - Custode
- The Finzi Detective Agency (1979) - Giuseppe Marchini
- L'imbranato (1979)
- L'affittacamere (1979) - Pasquale Esposito
- Flatfoot in Egypt (1980) - Maresc. Caputo
- Love in First Class (1980) - Il reverendo
- Savage Breed (1980) - Don Peppino
- Girls Will Be Girls (1980) - Enzo
- Il casinista (1980) - Don Totò
- L'amante tutta da scoprire (1981) - Gaetano
- The Week at the Beach (1981) - Antonio Martinelli
- Per favore, occupati di Amelia (1981) - Padre adottivo di Amelia
- Una vacanza del cactus (1981) - Giuseppe Zerboni
- Chaste and Pure (1981) - Don Bottazzi
- Crime at the Chinese Restaurant (1981) - Vincenzo
- Il marito in vacanza (1981) - Vinicio
- Il paramedico (1982) - Generoso Gallina-The lawyer
- Il sommergibile più pazzo del mondo (1982) - Il Ladro
- Sturmtruppen 2 (tutti al fronte) (1982)
- La sai l'ultima sui matti? (1982) - Babà
- Giuramento (1982) - Raffaele
- È forte un casino! (1982) - Michele
- Un jeans e una maglietta (1983)
- Sfrattato cerca casa equo canone (1983) - Gildo
- La discoteca (1983) - Hotel Director
- Il tifoso, l'arbitro e il calciatore (1984) - Sposito
- Il ragazzo di campagna (1984) - Blind man
- My Friends Act III (1985) - Cavalier Ferrini
- Vacanze d'estate (1985) - Commendator Turati
- Il coraggio di parlare (1987) - Vincenzino's father
- Le vie del Signore sono finite (1987) - Il padre di Camillo
- 32 December (1988) - Alfonso Caputo (segment "I penultimi fuochi")
- Man spricht deutsh (1988) - Paolo, italian beach observer
- Cinema Paradiso (1988) - Spaccafico
- What if Gargiulo Finds Out? (1988) - Padre di Teresa
- Sabato, domenica e lunedì (1990) - Don Antonio
- Le comiche (1990) - Il prete
- The House of Smiles (1991) - Avvocato
- Pacco, doppio pacco e contropaccotto (1993) - Il portiere della bisca clandestina
- Condannato a nozze (1993) - Ivano
- Amore a prima vista (1999) - Il cannibale
- L'uomo della fortuna (2000) - Armandino
- Our Tropical Island (2001) - Sciallero
- Ho visto le stelle (2003) - Prete
- I mostri oggi (2009) - Nonno di Alessia
