= Salvatore Samperi =

Italian film director (1944–2009)

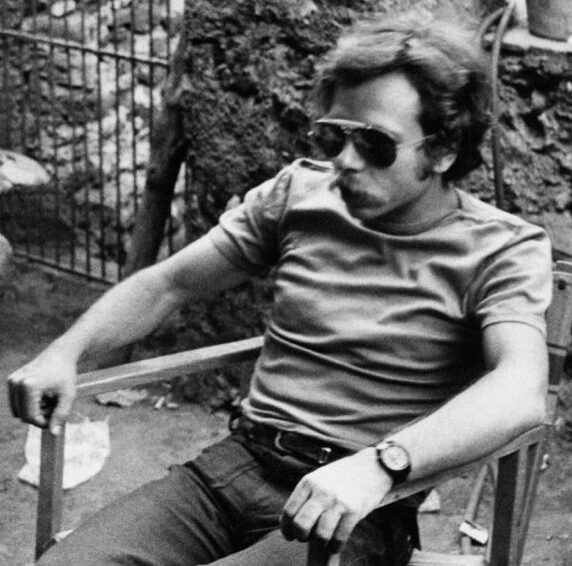
- Born: 26 July 1944; Padua, Italy
- Died: 4 March 2009 (aged 64); Rome, Italy
- Occupation: Film director
- Years active: 1968–2009

Salvatore Samperi (26 July 1944 – 4 March 2009) was an Italian film director. His 1973 film Malicious was entered into the 23rd Berlin International Film Festival and his 1979 film Ernesto was entered into the 29th Berlin International Film Festival.

== Selected filmography ==
- Come Play with Me (1968)
- Cuore di mamma (1969)
- Kill the Fatted Calf and Roast It (1970)
- Million Dollar Eel (1971)
- Beati i ricchi (1972)
- Malicious (1973)
- Lovers and Other Relatives (1973)
- La sbandata (supervising director, 1974)
- Sturmtruppen (1976)
- Submission (1976)
- Nenè (1977)
- Ernesto (1979)
- Love in First Class (1980)
- Chaste and Pure (1981)
- The Dark Side of Love (1984)
- La Bonne (1986)
