= Mariano Laurenti =

Italian film director (1929–2022)

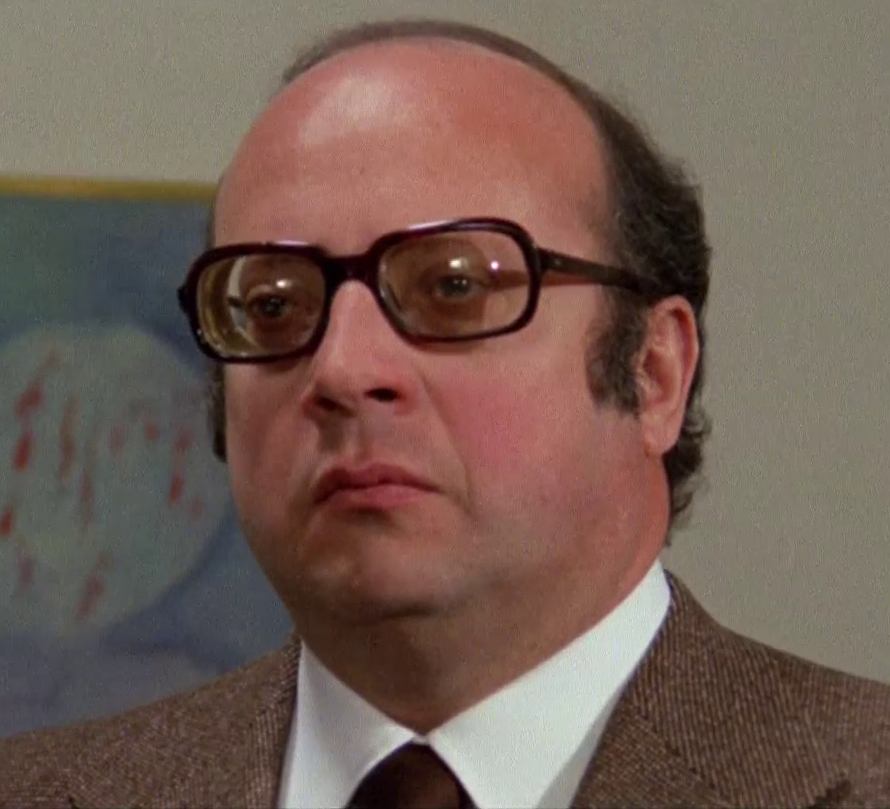
- Laurenti in Almost Human
- Born: 15 April 1929; Rome, Italy
- Died: 6 January 2022 (aged 92); Gubbio, Italy
- Other name: Francesco Martino
- Occupations: Film director, actor
- Years active: 1966–1999

Mariano Laurenti (15 April 1929 – 6 January 2022) was an Italian film director and actor.

== Career ==
Laurenti started as a script supervisor and later became an assistant director for, among others, Mauro Bolognini and Stefano Vanzina. He directed 50 films between 1966 and 1999, being mainly active in the "commedia sexy all'italiana" genre. Laurenti died in Gubbio on 6 January 2022, aged 92.

== Selected filmography ==
- Il vostro super agente Flit (1966)
- Zingara (1969)
- Satiricosissimo (1970)
- I due maghi del pallone (1970)
- Ubalda, All Naked and Warm (1972)
- Naughty Nun (1972)
- Il figlioccio del padrino (1973)
- The Inconsolable Widow Thanks All Those Who Consoled Her (1973)
- The Family Vice (1975)
- L'affittacamere (1976)
- Classe mista (1976)
- My Father's Private Secretary (1976)
- The Schoolteacher Goes to Boys' High (1977)
- La compagna di banco (1977)
- Per amore di Poppea (1977)
- La liceale nella classe dei ripetenti (1978)
- How to Seduce Your Teacher (1979)
- L'infermiera di notte (1979)
- The Nurse in the Military Madhouse (1979)
- La ripetente fa l'occhietto al preside (1980)
- Girls Will Be Girls (1980)
- Il ficcanaso (1981)
- L'onorevole con l'amante sotto il letto (1981)
- The Week at the Beach (1981)
