= List of Italian films of 1976 =

A list of films produced in Italy in 1976 (see 1976 in film):

Title	Director	Cast	Genre	Notes
1976
1900 (Novecento)	Bernardo Bertolucci	Robert De Niro, Gérard Depardieu, Dominique Sanda, Donald Sutherland, Alida Valli, Burt Lancaster, Laura Betti, Sterling Hayden	Drama	Restored and uncut DVD in 2006
L'adolescente	Alfonso Brescia	Dagmar Lassander, Sonia Viviani	Commedia sexy all'italiana	
L'affittacamere	Mariano Laurenti	Gloria Guida, Lino Banfi, Vittorio Caprioli, Adolfo Celi	Commedia sexy all'italiana	
Allegro Non Troppo	Bruno Bozzetto	Maurizio Nichetti, Maurizio Micheli	animation	parody of Fantasia
Al piacere di rivederla	Marco Leto	Ugo Tognazzi, Françoise Fabian, Miou-Miou	giallo-comedy	
And Agnes Chose to Die	Giuliano Montaldo	Ingrid Thulin, Michele Placido, Aurore Clément	Drama	
Atti impuri all'italiana	Oscar Brazzi	Maurizio Arena, Dagmar Lassander	Commedia sexy all'italiana	
Basta che non si sappia in giro	Luigi Comencini, Nanni Loy, Luigi Magni	Nino Manfredi, Monica Vitti, Johnny Dorelli	Commedia all'italiana	
Batton Story	Mario Landi	Femi Benussi, Daniela Giordano	Commedia sexy all'italiana	
Una bella governante di colore	Luigi Russo	Ines Pellegrini, Renzo Montagnani, Orchidea De Santis	Commedia sexy all'italiana	
Big Pot	Bruno Paolinelli	Carole Andre, Claudine Auger, Pier Luigi Conti	poliziottesco	
The Big Racket	Enzo G. Castellari	Fabio Testi, Vincent Gardenia, Renzo Palmer	poliziottesco	
Black Cobra Woman (Eva Nera)	Joe D'Amato	Jack Palance, Laura Gemser	Sexploitation film	
The Black Corsair	Sergio Sollima	Kabir Bedi, Carole André, Mel Ferrer	Adventure	
Black Emanuelle 2	Bitto Albertini	Shulamith Lasri, Angelo Infanti, Dagmar Lassander	erotic drama	
Blood and Bullets	Alfonso Brescia	Jack Palance, George Eastman, Jenny Tamburi	poliziottesco	
Bloody Payroll	Mario Caiano	Claudio Cassinelli, Silvia Dionisio, John Steiner, Vittorio Mezzogiorno	poliziottesco	
Bruciati da cocente passione	Giorgio Capitani	Cochi Ponzoni, Catherine Spaak, Aldo Maccione, Jane Birkin	Comedy	
La cameriera nera	Mario Bianchi	Carla Brait, Femi Benussi	Commedia sexy all'italiana	
La campagnola bella	Mario Siciliano	Franca Gonella, Gianni Dei, Femi Benussi	Commedia all'italiana	
The Career of a Chambermaid (Telefoni bianchi)	Dino Risi	Ugo Tognazzi, Vittorio Gassman, Agostina Belli	Commedia all'italiana	
Carioca tigre	Giuliano Carnimeo	Aldo Maccione, Michael Coby	action comedy	
Caro Michele	Mario Monicelli	Mariangela Melato, Delphine Seyrig		Monicelli won the Silver Bear for Best Director at Berlin
Che dottoressa ragazzi!	Gianfranco Baldanello	Femi Benussi, Maria Pia Conte	Commedia sexy all'italiana	
Colt 38 Special Squad	Massimo Dallamano	Marcel Bozzuffi, Carole André, Ivan Rassimov	poliziottesco	
Come cani arrabbiati	Mario Imperoli	Annarita Grapputo, Jean-Pierre Sabagh, Paola Sentore	poliziottesco	
Come ti rapisco il pupo	Lucio De Caro	Walter Chiari, Stefania Casini, Teo Teocoli, Franca Valeri	Comedy	
Il comune senso del pudore	Alberto Sordi	Alberto Sordi, Claudia Cardinale, Florinda Bolkan, Philippe Noiret	Comedy	
The Con Artists (Bluff - storia di truffe e di imbroglioni)	Sergio Corbucci	Adriano Celentano, Anthony Quinn, Corinne Cléry, Capucine	Comedy	
Confessions of a Frustrated Housewife	Andrea Bianchi	Carroll Baker, Adolfo Celi, Femi Benussi, Jenny Tamburi	Comedy	
Confessions of a Lady Cop (La poliziotta fa carriera)	Michele Massimo Tarantini	Edwige Fenech, Alvaro Vitali, Giuseppe Pambieri	Commedia sexy all'italiana	
The Cop in Blue Jeans	Bruno Corbucci	Tomás Milián, Jack Palance, Maria Rosaria Omaggio	poliziottesco	
Crimebusters	Michele Massimo Tarantini	Henry Silva, Antonio Sabàto	poliziottesco	
Cross Shot	Stelvio Massi	John Saxon, Lee J. Cobb, Renzo Palmer	poliziottesco	
Cuore di cane	Alberto Lattuada	Max von Sydow, Eleonora Giorgi, Mario Adorf	Comedy-drama	
Death Rage	Antonio Margheriti	Yul Brynner, Barbara Bouchet, Martin Balsam, Massimo Ranieri	Crime	
The Desert of the Tartars (Il deserto dei Tartari)	Valerio Zurlini	Jacques Perrin, Vittorio Gassman, Francisco Rabal, Giuliano Gemma, Helmut Griem, Philippe Noiret, Fernando Rey, Jean-Louis Trintignant, Max von Sydow	Drama	David di Donatello Best Film winner. Based on the famous Dino Buzzati's The Tartar Steppe novel
Deported Women of the SS Special Section	Rino De Silvestro	John Steiner, Lina Polito, Erna Schürer	Nazisploitation	
The Diamond Peddlers	Giuliano Carnimeo	Michael Coby, Paul L. Smith	action comedy	
Donna... cosa si fa per te	Giuliano Biagetti	Renzo Montagnani, Jenny Tamburi	comedy	
La dottoressa del distretto militare	Nando Cicero	Edwige Fenech, Alvaro Vitali	Commedia sexy all'italiana	
Down and Dirty (Brutti, sporchi e cattivi)	Ettore Scola	Nino Manfredi, Marcella Michelangeli, Zoe Incrocci	commedia all'italiana	Cannes Award for best actor (Manfredi)
Due sul pianerottolo	Mario Amendola	Erminio Macario, Rita Pavone	Comedy	
Emanuelle in Bangkok	Joe D'Amato	Laura Gemser, Ely Galleani, Ivan Rassimov	Erotic	
Evil Thoughts	Ugo Tognazzi	Ugo Tognazzi, Edwige Fenech	Comedy	
Febbre da cavallo	Steno	Gigi Proietti, Enrico Montesano, Catherine Spaak	Comedy	
Fellini's Casanova	Federico Fellini	Donald Sutherland, Tina Aumont	Felliniesque	Academy Award for Costume Design winner
Free Hand for a Tough Cop	Umberto Lenzi	Tomás Milián, Claudio Cassinelli, Henry Silva	Poliziottesco	
Giovannino	Paolo Nuzzi	Christian De Sica, Tina Aumont, Jenny Tamburi	Comedy	
Goodnight, Ladies and Gentlemen	Luigi Comencini, Nanni Loy, Luigi Magni, Mario Monicelli, Ettore Scola	Marcello Mastroianni, Vittorio Gassman, Ugo Tognazzi, Paolo Villaggio, Senta Berger	Comedy	
Hit Squad	Bruno Corbucci	Tomás Milián, Robert Webber, Lilli Carati	poliziottesco	
The House with Laughing Windows	Pupi Avati	Lino Capolicchio, Francesca Marciano, Gianni Cavina, Giulio Pizzirani	Giallo	
I Am Self Sufficient (Io sono un autarchico)	Nanni Moretti	Nanni Moretti, Fabio Traversa	Comedy	
Illustrious Corpses	Francesco Rosi	Lino Ventura, Tino Carraro, Max von Sydow, Fernando Rey	Thriller	
The Inheritance (L'eredità Ferramonti)	Mauro Bolognini	Anthony Quinn, Dominique Sanda, Fabio Testi, Adriana Asti	Drama	Cannes Award for best actress (Sanda)
The Innocent (L'innocente)	Luchino Visconti	Giancarlo Giannini, Laura Antonelli, Jennifer O'Neill, Massimo Girotti	Drama	
Keoma	Enzo G. Castellari	Franco Nero, William Berger, Woody Strode	Spaghetti Western	
Languid Kisses, Wet Caresses	Alfredo Angeli	Gigi Proietti, Giovanna Ralli	Comedy	
The Last Round	Stelvio Massi	Carlos Monzón, Luc Merenda, Leonora Fani	crime	
The Last Woman (L'ultima donna)	Marco Ferreri	Ornella Muti, Gérard Depardieu, Michel Piccoli, Renato Salvatori	Drama	
Il letto in piazza	Bruno Gaburro	Renzo Montagnani, Rossana Podestà, John Ireland	Comedy	
Live Like a Cop, Die Like a Man	Ruggero Deodato	Marc Porel, Ray Lovelock, Adolfo Celi, Silvia Dionisio	Poliziottesco	
The Loves and Times of Scaramouche	Enzo G. Castellari	Michael Sarrazin, Ursula Andress, Aldo Maccione	Comedy	
Luna di miele in tre	Carlo Vanzina	Renato Pozzetto, Stefania Casini, Vincent Gardenia, Harry Reems	Comedy	
Lunatics and Lovers (Culastrisce nobile veneziano)	Flavio Mogherini	Marcello Mastroianni, Lino Toffolo, Claudia Mori, Adriano Celentano	Comedy	
Mark Strikes Again	Stelvio Massi	Franco Gasparri, John Saxon	poliziottesco	
Il medico... la studentessa	Silvio Amadio	Gloria Guida, Jacques Dufilho	Commedia sexy all'italiana	
Meet Him and Die	Franco Prosperi	Ray Lovelock, Martin Balsam	Crime	
The Merciless Man	Mario Lanfranchi	Tony Lo Bianco, Adolfo Celi, Barbara Vittoria Calori	poliziottesco	
Mister Scarface	Fernando Di Leo	Jack Palance, Harry Baer, Vittorio Caprioli	Poliziottesco	
The Mistress Is Served				
Mr. Robinson	Sergio Corbucci	Paolo Villaggio, Zeudi Araya	comedy	
My Sister in Law	Lucio Fulci	Edwige Fenech, Gianni Agus	Commedia sexy all'italiana	
Nick the Sting	Fernando Di Leo	Luc Merenda, Lee J. Cobb, Gabriele Ferzetti, Luciana Paluzzi	Crime-comedy	
Oedipus Orca	Eriprando Visconti	Rena Niehaus, Gabriele Ferzetti, Michele Placido	Drama	sequel of La Orca
Oh, Serafina!	Alberto Lattuada	Renato Pozzetto, Dalila Di Lazzaro	Comedy-drama	
La Orca	Eriprando Visconti	Michele Placido, Rena Niehaus	Drama	
Paura in città	Giuseppe Rosati	Maurizio Merli, James Mason, Cyril Cusack, Silvia Dionisio	Poliziottesco	
Per amore di Cesarina	Vittorio Sindoni	Walter Chiari, Cinzia Monreale, Gino Bramieri	Comedy	
Perdutamente tuo... mi firmo Macaluso Carmelo fu Giuseppe	Vittorio Sindoni	Stefano Satta Flores, Macha Méril, Leopoldo Trieste, Cinzia Monreale	Comedy	
Plot of Fear	Paolo Cavara	Corinne Cléry, Tom Skerritt, Michele Placido, Eli Wallach	Giallo	
La portiera nuda	Luigi Cozzi	Irene Miracle, Erika Blanc, Giorgio Bracardi	Commedia sexy all'italiana	
Private Vices, Public Pleasures	Miklós Jancsó	Lajos Balázsovits, Pamela Villoresi		Entered into the 1976 Cannes Film Festival
La professoressa di scienze naturali	Mariano Laurenti	Lilli Carati, Alvaro Vitali	Commedia sexy all'italiana	
I prosseneti	Brunello Rondi	Stefania Casini, Alain Cuny, Silvia Dionisio	Drama	
Quanto è bello lu murire acciso	Ennio Lorenzini	Giulio Brogi, Stefano Satta Flores	drama	
Quel movimento che mi piace tanto	Franco Rossetti	Carlo Giuffrè, Martine Brochard, Renzo Montagnani, Cinzia Monreale	Commedia sexy all'italiana	
I ragazzi della Roma violenta	Renato Savino	Gino Milli, Cristina Businari, Emilio Locurcio	poliziottesco	
Ragazza alla pari	Mino Guerrini	Gloria Guida, Carlo Giuffrè	Commedia sexy all'italiana	
Roma, l'altra faccia della violenza	Marino Girolami	Marcel Bozzuffi, Anthony Steffen	poliziottesco	Italian-French co-production
Rome Armed to the Teeth	Umberto Lenzi	Maurizio Merli, Tomas Milian, Arthur Kennedy	poliziottesco	
Safari Express	Michele Lupo	Giuliano Gemma, Ursula Andress, Jack Palance	Comedy Adventure	
Salon Kitty	Tinto Brass	Helmut Berger, Ingrid Thulin, Teresa Ann Savoy	erotic-drama	
San Babila-8 P.M.	Carlo Lizzani	Brigitte Skay		
Savana violenta	Antonio Climati, Mario Morra	Giuseppe Rinaldi (narrator)	Mondo	Follow-up film to Ultime grida dalla savana
Scandalo in famiglia	Marcello Andrei	Gloria Guida, Carlo Giuffrè, Gianni Nazzaro	Commedia sexy all'italiana	
Il secondo tragico Fantozzi	Luciano Salce	Paolo Villaggio, Gigi Reder	Comedy	sequel of Fantozzi
La segretaria privata di mio padre	Mariano Laurenti	Maria Rosaria Omaggio, Renzo Montagnani	Commedia sexy all'italiana	
Sex with a Smile	Sergio Martino	Marty Feldman, Giovanna Ralli, Dayle Haddon, Edwige Fenech	Commedia sexy all'italiana	
Sex with a Smile II	Sergio Martino	Ursula Andress, Johnny Dorelli, Barbara Bouchet, Nadia Cassini	Commedia sexy all'italiana	sequel of Sex with a Smile
Sexycop	Duccio Tessari	Christian De Sica, Ines Pellegrini, Oreste Lionello	Comedy	
Sharks and Men	Michel Laubreaux Bruno Vailati	Bernard Tiphaine	Documentary	Italian-Japanese co-production
Il solco di pesca	Maurizio Liverani	Martine Brochard, Gloria Guida	erotic-drama	
Soldier of Fortune	Pasquale Festa Campanile	Bud Spencer, Andréa Ferréol	Comedy	
A Sold Life	Aldo Florio	Enrico Maria Salerno, Gerardo Amato	War	
Sorbole... che romagnola	Alfredo Rizzo	Maria Rosaria Riuzzi, Massimo Ciavarro	Commedia sexy all'italiana	
Special Cop in Action	Marino Girolami	Maurizio Merli, John Saxon	poliziottesco	
Special Squad Shoots on Sight	Giulio Giuseppe Negri	Beba Loncar, Irfan Atasoy, Gordon Mitchell	Action	Italian-Turkish co-production
Strange Shadows in an Empty Room	Alberto De Martino	Stuart Whitman, John Saxon, Martin Landau		Italian-Panama co-production
Strange Occasion	Luigi Comencini, Nanni Loy, Luigi Magni	Nino Manfredi, Alberto Sordi, Paolo Villaggio, Stefania Sandrelli	Commedia all'italiana	
Street People	Maurizio Lucidi	Roger Moore, Stacy Keach, Ivo Garrani	Crime	
Sturmtruppen	Salvatore Samperi	Renato Pozzetto, Lino Toffolo, Cochi Ponzoni	Comedy	
Submission	Salvatore Samperi	Franco Nero, Lisa Gastoni	Erotic drama	
Take All of Me	Luigi Cozzi	Richard Johnson, Pamela Villoresi	Melodrama	Italian-Japanese co-production
Terror in Rome	Sergio Grieco & Massimo Felisatti	Antonio Sabàto	poliziottesco	
Todo modo	Elio Petri	Gian Maria Volonté, Marcello Mastroianni, Mariangela Melato, Franco Citti, Renato Salvatori, Michel Piccoli, Ciccio Ingrassia	Politics	Based on a Leonardo Sciascia's novel
L'unica legge in cui credo	Claudio Giorgiutti	Raika Juri, Claudio Giorgi, Bianca Maria Roccatani		
Victory March	Marco Bellocchio	Franco Nero, Michele Placido, Miou-Miou	Drama	
Violent Naples	Umberto Lenzi	Maurizio Merli, John Saxon, Barry Sullivan	Crime	
Werewolf Woman	Rino Di Silvestro	Dagmar Lassander, Frederick Stafford, Howard Ross	Horror	
A Whisper in the Dark	Marcello Aliprandi	John Phillip Law, Nathalie Delon, Olga Bisera		
Young, Violent, Dangerous	Romolo Guerrieri	Tomas Milian, Eleonora Giorgi	Poliziottesco	
