= Return from Death (Frankenstein 2000) =

1992 Italian horror film directed by Joe d'Amato

- Original poster art
- Directed by: Aristide Massaccesi (as David Hills)
- Written by: Donatella Donati (as Joan Russell); Antonio Tentori; Michele Soavi (uncredited)
- Produced by: Aristide Massacessi
- Starring: Donald O'Brien; Cinzia Monreale; Maurice Poli
- Cinematography: Aristide Massaccesi (as Frederico Slonisko)
- Edited by: Rosanna Landi (as Kathleen Stratton)
- Music by: Piero Montanari
- Production company: Filmirage
- Distributed by: Eureka Film International
- Release date: 13 June 1993; (Fantafestival)
- Running time: 92 minutes
- Country: Italy
- Language: English
- Budget: US$1.6 million

Return from Death (Frankenstein 2000) (Italian: Ritorno dalla morte (Frankenstein 2000)) is a 1992 Italian horror film directed by Aristide Massaccesi, and starring Donald O'Brien, Cinzia Monreale and Maurice Poli. In it, a crippled former boxer gets framed for beating a psychic woman into a coma, but the two form a telepathic bond during a neurological experiment, and her mind turns him into an unstoppable creature who wreaks vengeance on the real culprits. It was the final horror film directed by Massaccesi, also known as Joe d'Amato.

== Cast ==
- Donald O'Brien as Ric
- Cinzia Monreale as Georgia
- Maurice Poli as Hoffner
- Robin Tazusky as Stephen
- Riccardo Acerbi as Thomas
- Dan Dustman as Hans
- Mark Frank as Kurt
- Mark Quail as Erik
- Walter Travor as Strolls
- Martin Dansky as Dr. Frankenstein

== Production ==
The film marked Aristide Massaccesi's comeback as a horror director after several years away from the genre (excluding uncredited work on a few embattled shoots). This was in part due to his willingness to allocate his Filmirage company's best budgets to other members of his stable. At an early stage, the project was attached to Alberto Lonardi, usually an assistant director, perhaps for bureaucratic reasons. Initially known as just Ritorno dalla morte, it originated from an unproduced script written by Masaccessi's protégé Michele Soavi, which did not contain Frankenstein themes and which Massaccesi compared to Patrick. That incarnation was due to enter production in November 1990. As with other Filmirage fantasy films, it would begin shooting in Italy, but would also include some location work in the U.S. to broaden its commercial appeal.

Ultimately, it did not proceed and Massaccesi decided to transform the film into a modern re-imagining of Frankenstein. He asked fellow director Lucio Fulci, for whom he was producing Door to Silence, to introduce him to his writer at the time, Antonio Tentori. Tentori started the rewrites in early 1991, teaming up with Massaccesi's partner Donatella Donati while retaining sizeable components of Soavi's draft. Massaccesi re-watched James Whale's classic 1931 adaptation so that he could add visual nods to it during key scenes. He considered both Return from Death and Frankenstein 2000 as the title, and advertised the film under the latter name at the MIFED (Mercato internazionale del film e del documentario) trade show. The picture had a listed budget of slightly less than ITL 2 billion, equivalent to about US$1.6 million at the time.

As the project marked Massaccesi's return to horror, he cast Cinzia Monreale, who had starred in his well regarded Buio Omega, in the female lead. Although Italian-based Donald O'Brien had previously worked for him as well, the Irish actor was hired through a twist of fate, after a domestic accident left him with a limp that reminded the director of the creature's gait in the classic Universal films. Despite the Anglophone pseudonyms found in the credits, the make-up effects were done by Fantastudio Produzioni, an Italian team headed by Danilo Del Monte.

Photography started in the Rome agglomeration in March 1992, using the former Dino De Laurentiis studios, then known as Kinepolis. Early into production, D'Amato announced that he intended to shoot the film's exteriors in Vienna, Austria, as he wanted the investigation scenes to have a different feel than the mafia movies that often used the Italian capital as a backdrop. The finished product does include a few establishing shots of Mariazell, an Austrian town which was a principal location of Filmirage's contemporary erotic thriller Sul filo del rasoio. However, exteriors featuring the main actors were all filmed around Rome and the neighboring city of Viterbo.

== Soundtrack ==
Original Soundtrack Music from the Films: La Casa 3 – Ghosthouse / Frankenstein 2000 – Ritorno dalla morte

Film score by Piero Montanari
- Released: 1999
- Genre: Electronic, ambient
- Length: 60:45
- Label: Beat Records Company

The film's soundtrack was composed and produced by Filmirage regular Piero Montanari. A compilation album featuring thirteen tracks from this film, as well as cuts from another Filmirage production, Ghosthouse, was released by Italian label Beat Records Company in 1999.

== Release ==
=== Festival screenings ===
Return from Death was presented on June 13, 1993, at the Fantafestival in Rome. Audience reaction was reportedly unfavorable, and it was the film's only theatrical showing in Italy. It was also seen at Eurofest in London, United Kingdom, on 7 October 1995 in what was promoted as an international premiere.

=== Home media ===
The film failed to gain traction, and general release eluded it for years in Italy as in many other territories. In 2007, Raro Video, an imprint of Italian major Minerva Pictures, issued it as part of their "Horror Club" collection, in what was billed as collector's edition DVD. The version offered on that disc features English language dialogue, although it has been described as sounding unnatural in places.

== Critical response ==
Louis Paul, author of the book Italian Horror Film Directors, was unimpressed, deeming Frankenstein 2000 "disappointing" and "an unsuccessful attempt at a comeback within the confines of the science-fiction and horror genres". He added that it suffered from "a low budget" and "an obvious lack of enthusiasm, which even affects the cast". In his Horror and Science Fiction Films compendium, Donald C. Willis concurred and summed up the film as a "[c]lumsy attempt to transfer the myth of Frankenstein to modern times." Massaccesi later felt that the audience had missed a number of the film's Frankenstein references, which contributed to its underwhelming reception.
