= Carambola (disambiguation) =

Carambola, also known as star fruit, is the fruit of Averrhoa carambola.

Carambola may also refer to:

- Carambola!, a 1974 western comedy film
- Carom billiards, the overarching title of a family of billiards games generally played on cloth-covered pocketless tables
