= House of Horror =

House of Horror or House of Horrors may refer to:

== In film and television ==
- The House of Horror, a 1929 horror comedy film
- House of Horrors, a 1946 Universal Pictures horror film
- Hammer House of Horror, a television series produced by Hammer Film Productions
- New Line Cinema's House of Horror, a licensing division of New Line Cinema

== Other uses ==
- Universal's House of Horrors, an attraction at the Universal Studios Hollywood theme park
- 25 Cromwell Street, sometimes referred to as the "house of horrors", a house associated with serial killers Fred West and Rosemary West
- "House Of Horrors", a song by horrorcore group Insane Clown Posse
- Turpin case, referred to as the "house of horrors"
- "House of Horrors match", a professional wrestling match between Bray Wyatt and Randy Orton that took place at WWE Payback (2017)
- Haunted attraction (simulated)

== See also ==
- Dr. Terror's House of Horrors, a 1965 British horror film
- The Haunted House of Horror, an early "slasher" film first released in 1969
- The Sweet House of Horrors, a 1989 Italian horror film
- Hugo's House of Horrors, a 1990 computer adventure game
- Treehouse of Horror, a series of Halloween-based The Simpsons anthology episodes
