= Convoy Buddies =

1975 film

- Directed by: Giuliano Carnimeo
- Screenplay by: Pier Luigi Alberti; Gabriella Giustini; Tulio Demicheli
- Story by: Sergio Bazzini
- Produced by: Ugo Tucci
- Starring: Paul Smith; Michael Coby; Eduardo Fajardo; Angel del Pozo; Dominic Barto; Giuliana Calandra; Tony Norton; Fernando Bilbao
- Cinematography: Vicente Minaya
- Edited by: Amedeo Giomini
- Music by: JUNIPER
- Release date: 1975
- Countries: Italy; Spain
- Language: Italian

Convoy Buddies (Italian: Simone e Matteo - Un gioco da ragazzi, Spanish: Simón y Mateo, also known as Kid Stuff) is a 1975 Italian-Spanish adventure-comedy film directed by Giuliano Carnimeo and starring Paul Smith and Michael Coby, a couple formed with the purpose of copying the successful films of the duo Terence Hill and Bud Spencer. It was followed by The Diamond Peddlers.

The film was selected for American release by Film Ventures International, and producer Edward L. Montoro changed Smith's name to Bob Spencer and Cantafora's name to Terrence Hall. Smith sued, successfully arguing that an actor's name recognition is vital to his career. The judicial system agreed and ruled against FVI, which paid Smith damages and court costs.

== Plot ==
Having stolen a piece of meat, hungry small time crooks Toby and Butch are running through the streets of an Italian city. With no money in their pockets, they spot a sign, "Employment office, truck drivers section", go inside and are seen by a shifty man who offers them cash for driving to Marseille a truck supposedly loaded with insecticide.

Carelessly driving the truck out of the warehouse, they crush some of the wooden boxes in their load, spilling out a gun. On the road, they engage in an extended argument with drivers of the same type of truck, with the two trucks bumping into each other, going off the road and then resuming their rivalry while squeezing a small passenger car between them.

At the French border, they barely avoid having one of the spilled guns spotted by a customs agent. As they continue driving, the gunrunners who hired them are radioing the truck's location. While in the truck's cab, they play with the gun, then stop along the road and continue their gun games, eventually shooting a hole through one of their own tires. The four gunrunning henchmen, led by Lucky, create a roadblock to take the truck, but Toby and Butch drive right through.

== Cast ==
- Paul Smith as Toby (Simone)
- Michael Coby as Butch (Matteo)
- Dominic Barto as Lucky
- Giuliana Calandra as Rosy
- Angel del Pozo as navy official
- Mario Brega as gang leader's henchman
- Francisco Merino as transportation official
- Riccardo Petrazzi as Paul
- Enrico Chiappafreddo
- Emilio Messina as Jean
- Giovanni Pazzafini as French sailor
- Fernando Bilbao as gang leader's bodyguard
- Tony Norton as Frou-Frou
- Eduardo Fajardo as gang leader

Uncredited

- Gino Pagnani as Fiat 500 driver
- Franca Scagnetti as farmer
- Pietro Torrisi as assassin

== Reception ==
Preston McLaurin from The Sun News said the movie "might be a loose rambling film, but it never lets down the comedy or the pace it sets in the beginning, and it also "lumps its whole cast into a likable bunch and even gets some boyish charm out of Hall and Spencer". Richard Labonté of The Ottawa Citizen wrote in his review that the film reminded him of The Three Stooges, in that the virtue of the film is that "though the humor is rooted in violence, it's a cartoon violence in which nothing suffers". He was quick to point out that "much of the action consists of heads being hit by balled fists, bodies being tossed through panes of glass, inanimate objects – doors, hammers, beds, bottles, – rendering animate objects – people – inanimate".

In her review for the Los Angeles Times, Linda Gross said that director Giuliano Carnimeo "is very adept at slapstick and at action and demolition sequences, but unfortunately, screenwriter Tulio Demicheli doesn't give him very much to work with". She complained that "every car crash, every joke, every encounter with a woman is milked beyond the limits of entertainment, and the story line is fairly predictably too". She did note that Spencer and Hall "work well together" and Karen Blake is "amusing".

== See also ==
- List of Italian films of 1975

== Bibliography ==
- Hughes, Howard (2004). Cinema Italiano: The Complete Guide from Classics to Cult. Bloomsbury Publishing. ISBN 978-0-85771-978-2.
