= Quel movimento che mi piace tanto =

1976 film by Franco Rossetti

- Directed by: Franco Rossetti
- Written by: Francesco Milizia; Franco Rossetti
- Starring: Carlo Giuffrè; Martine Brochard; Cinzia Monreale
- Cinematography: Carlo Giuffre
- Music by: Manuel De Sica
- Distributed by: Stefano Film
- Release date: 1976
- Country: Italy
- Language: Italian

Quel movimento che mi piace tanto (That movement which I love so much) is a 1976 Italian comedy film written and directed by Franco Rossetti. It is often credited as a commedia sexy all'italiana film.

== Cast ==
- Carlo Giuffrè as Lawyer Fabrizio Siniscalchi
- Martine Brochard as Livia Bonoli-Serpieri
- Renzo Montagnani as Marquis Cecco Ottobuoni
- Cinzia Monreale as Anna Gilioli
- Francesca Benedetti as Lucia Guarnieri aka 'Lucy'
- Enzo Cannavale as Salvatore Siniscalchi
- Enzo Guarini as Agenore Fantecchi
- Mario Colli as Piero
- Carlo Verdone as Man at the Bar

== Production ==
The film marked the film debut, both as actor and as assistant director, of Carlo Verdone. It was shot between Siena, Monteriggioni, and the De Paolis studios in Rome.

== Release ==
The film was released in Italian cinemas by Stefano Film on 16 January 1976.

== See also ==
- List of Italian films of 1976
