= Ettore G. Mattia =

Italian journalist and actor

Ettore Mattia
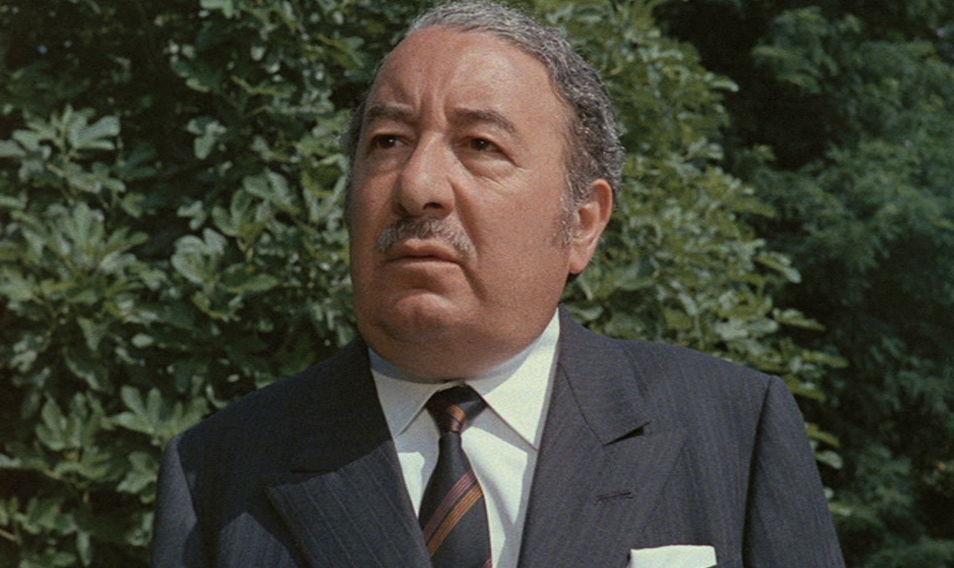
- Born: 30 May 1910; Potenza, Italy
- Died: 10 October 1982 (aged 72); Rome, Italy
- Occupation: Actor

Ettore Mattia (30 May 1910 – 10 October 1982) was an Italian journalist and actor.

== Life and career ==
Born in Potenza, Mattia was a journalist and a film critic for several newspapers and magazines, and was also press officer of Titanus.

Mattia was mainly active as a character actor, and in 1969 he won a Nastro d'Argento for best supporting actor for his performance in Luciano Salce's La pecora nera. He died of heart attack.

== Filmography ==
Year	Title	Role	Notes
1947	I fratelli Karamazoff		
1948	Hey Boy	Commissario	
1952	The Overcoat	Il segretario generale	
1953	I Chose Love		
1960	Two Women	Il passeggero sul treno	Uncredited
1964	The Magnificent Cuckold	Commendator Calise	Uncredited
1965	La Celestina P... R...	Cantelli	
1967	Don Juan in Sicily	Dr. Giorgini	
1968	The Black Sheep	Minister Mattia	
1970	Basta guardarla	The Priest	
1971	Black Belly of the Tarantula	La catapulta	Uncredited
1972	Anche se volessi lavorare, che faccio?	Il 'dottore' - The Antique Dealer	
1974	Claretta and Ben	Falabrino	
1976	Per amore di Cesarina		
1976	Per amore di Cesarina		
1976	L'affittacamere		
1976	La prima notte di nozze		
1979	The Face with Two Left Feet	Uomo basso al telefono	
1980	The Cricket	Insegnante di musica	
1982	Monsignor	Pietro	(final film role)
