= Zaat =

- Theatrical poster
- Directed by: Don Barton; Uncredited: Arnold Stevens
- Written by: Don Barton; Ron Kivett; Lee O. Larew
- Produced by: Don Barton
- Starring: Marshall Grauer
- Cinematography: Jack McGowan
- Edited by: George Yarbrough
- Music by: Jamie DeFrates; Barry Hodgin; Jack Tamul (electronic)
- Production company: Barton Films
- Distributed by: Aquarius Releasing
- Release date: January 1971 (United States)
- Running time: 100 minutes
- Country: United States
- Language: English
- Budget: $50,000

Zaat is a 1971 American independent science fiction horror film produced and directed by Don Barton, and co-written by Barton, Lee O. Larew and Ron Kivett. Produced on a $50,000 budget, the film stars Marshall Grauer as a mad scientist who aims to transform himself into a fishman to seek revenge on those who spurned him.

Critical reception has been predominantly negative, with criticism directed at the film's script, acting, and poor monster design. Cited as one of the worst films ever made, it gained significant exposure when it was used in an episode of the movie-mocking television series Mystery Science Theater 3000 in May 1999, under its alternate title Blood Waters of Dr. Z.

== Plot ==
In his laboratory, mad scientist Dr. Kurt Leopold contemplates his former colleagues' derision of his formula Z_{a}A_{t}, a compound that can transform humans into sea creature hybrids. He injects himself with the serum and immerses himself in a tank, emerging as a catfish-like monster. In his new form, Leopold releases walking catfish across the town's lakes and rivers, and releases "Zaat" into the water supply, rendering many of the townspeople ill. Meanwhile, Sheriff Lou Krantz and marine biologist Rex Baker investigate strange occurrences with the local catfish and waterways.

Leopold turns his attention to killing those who mocked his work. He murders former colleague Maxson and his family on a boat, followed by associate Ewing in his home. Afterward, Leopold kidnaps a young female camper at a lake. Taking her back to his lab, the doctor straps her into a mesh basket beside a large water tank, with the intention of making her his mate. However, due to her struggling, the equipment malfunctions, and her corpse, partially transformed, is pulled from the tank.

Baffled by the deaths, Rex contacts an organization known as INPIT, which dispatches scientists Martha Walsh and Walker Stevens to investigate. Following the kidnapping of Martha, Leopold heads again towards his lab, surreptitiously followed by Walker, who has picked up Leopold's radioactive trail. The doctor arrives at the lab with Martha, where Rex and Lou happen to be searching. Lou attempts to apprehend Leopold outside his laboratory but is killed in the process; inside, Rex also tries to stop the doctor as he prepares Martha for her transformation. After seriously wounding Rex, he injects Martha with "Zaat", readies her to be dunked into the tank, and makes his getaway with canisters of the compound, while Walker attempts to stop him before dying from an earlier snake bite. Martha's transformation fails, and she is saved from the tank by a dying Rex, although she appears to be in a trance and immediately follows Leopold into the sea.

== Cast ==
- Marshall Grauer as Dr. Kurt Leopold
- Wade Popwell as The Monster
- Paul Galloway as Sheriff Lou Krantz
- Gerald Cruse as Marine Biologist Rex Baker
- Sanna Ringhaver as INPIT Agent Martha Walsh
- Dave Dickerson as INPIT Agent Walker Stevens
- Archie Valliere as Deputy Sheriff
- Nancy Lien as Girl Camper
- Jamie DeFrates as Acoustic Guitarist
- Edward Nick Wildrick
- Jimmy Merrill (Victim)

== Production ==
Jacksonville, Florida resident Don Barton serves as director, producer and co-writer, alongside Lee O. Larew and Ron Kivett.

Filming took place over one month in 1970 on a $75,000 budget, $50,000 for production and $25,000 for film prints and advertising. Locations include various Florida locales, such as Rainbow Springs, Green Cove Springs and Marineland.

== Release ==
The film was originally distributed by Horizon Films. It was shown in Jacksonville as well as in theaters in mostly southern states during its original theatrical release. It was also shown in a theater in Manhattan's 42nd Street through Aquarius Releasing, known for distributing exploitation films. It was shown in the theater for one day before being pulled, with the movie only making $200. In 1983, the movie was re-released by Capitol Productions. In 1985, it was released under the title Attack of the Swamp Creatures, which had new cast and production credits added to it. Zaat was originally released on video by ThrillerVideo under the Attack of the Swamp Creature title, with popular horror hostess Elvira hosting and spoofing the film throughout. In 2001, the film was released on video for its thirtieth anniversary under the Zaat title. Limited to five hundred copies, the videotapes were autographed by Don Barton and co-writer Ron Kivett.

In February 2012, it was later issued on DVD and Blu-ray for the first time by Film Chest and HD Cinema Classics. Digitally restored in HD and transferred from original 35mm elements, the DVD/Blu-ray combo pack also contained a feature-length audio commentary by cast and crew, the original 35mm trailer, television spots, outtakes, a radio interview, a before-and-after restoration demo, and an original movie art postcard.

== Reception ==
Dennis Schwartz from Ozus' World Movie Reviews, grading the film on an A+ to F scale, awarded the film a "C". In his review, Schwartz called the film "[an] overlong and boring mad scientist monster film", criticizing the film's acting, direction, excessive use of filler scenes, and an unimaginative climax. Dave Sindelar on his Fantastic Movie Musings and Ramblings wrote, "The concept is ridiculous (let’s face it – catfish just aren’t scary), the plot is primitive, the acting is very weak, and the direction isn’t good. Nonetheless, the film is full of unintentionally funny dialogue, the use of sound and music is unique (if wrongheaded), and it’s more charmingly primitive than excruciatingly dull." Robert L. Jerome from Cinefantastique, while noting the movie had the right ideas in it, called it a "fiasco" for its implementation. VideoHound's Golden Movie Retriever by Jim Craddock gave it zero stars. Keith Phipps for The A.V. Club described the film as being simultaneously "Awful" and "Awfully charming".

Critic Jeffrey Kauffman said, "this is the sort of film Ed Wood, Jr. might have made—on a bad day" and added, "Lovers of fantastically bad films rate Zaat one of the worst". Patrick Naugle of DVD Verdict stated, "The acting in Zaat is below subpar. Actors seem to be whispering their lines and trying hard not to fully comprehend that they're in one of the worst films ever made", while Michael Rubino of DVD Verdict also claimed, "Zaat may be one of the worst films ever created". NPR called it a "sci-fi fiasco" when it became "the winner — er, loser —" on IMDb's Bottom 100.

== Legacy ==
=== Mystery Science Theater 3000 ===
Under the title Blood Waters of Dr. Z, the cult television series Mystery Science Theater 3000 featured the movie in episode #1005. The episode, which originally aired May 2, 1999, on the Sci-Fi Channel, mocked the film's low-budget effects and self-experimenting scientist villain. Writer/performer Bill Corbett writes the movie had many elements that make a good MST3K episode: "a pompous mad scientist; a ridiculous, badly costumed monster; a fat redneck sheriff; a few vapid good-looking heroes; and a nice silly theme song."

Director Don Barton reportedly felt that the Sci-Fi Channel had failed to properly secure the rights to the film; he issued a cease and desist, followed by a lawsuit. This caused Sci-Fi to pull the episode, only rerunning it twice in 2001 when they had cleared the issue with Barton out of court.

Writer Jim Vorel gave the episode a middling ranking in his examination of all the episodes from the first twelve seasons, placing the episode at #105. (Note: Ranking based on 197 episodes as of 2018.) He calls the movie "a pug-fugly slice of monster movie, all dull, earthy colors and poorly articulated fish-man suits." His evaluation is that the villain's plan, "turning himself into a fish monster ... [to] somehow aid him in “ruling the world”, seems "profoundly unlikely" to work.

The episode featuring the film was released on the Mystery Science Theater 3000: Volume XVII DVD collection by Shout! Factory on March 16, 2010. The Blood Waters of Dr. Z disc includes two TV promos for the movie, its theatrical trailer, and a stills gallery. Other episodes in the collection include The Crawling Eye (episode #101), The Beatniks (episode #415), and The Final Sacrifice (episode #910). The box set was later discontinued, and the episode was repackaged with "The Lost and Found Collection" in 2018.

== See also ==
- List of American films of 1971
- List of 20th century films considered the worst
- Creature from the Black Lagoon
