= Per amore di Cesarina =

- Directed by: Vittorio Sindoni
- Written by: Ghigo De Chiara; Vittorio Sindoni
- Cinematography: Safai Teherani
- Music by: Enrico Simonetti
- Release date: 1976
- Language: Italian

Per amore di Cesarina (For Love of Cesarina) is a 1976 Italian comedy film directed by Vittorio Sindoni.

== Cast ==
- Walter Chiari: Davide Camporesi
- Gino Bramieri: Vindice Forattini
- Cinzia Monreale: Cesarina
- Valeria Moriconi: Elvira Camporesi
- Roberto Chevalier: Paolino Mariani
- Deddi Savagnone: Adalgisa
- Ettore Mattia

== See also ==
- List of Italian films of 1976
