= Ernesto Colli =

Italian actor (1940–1982)

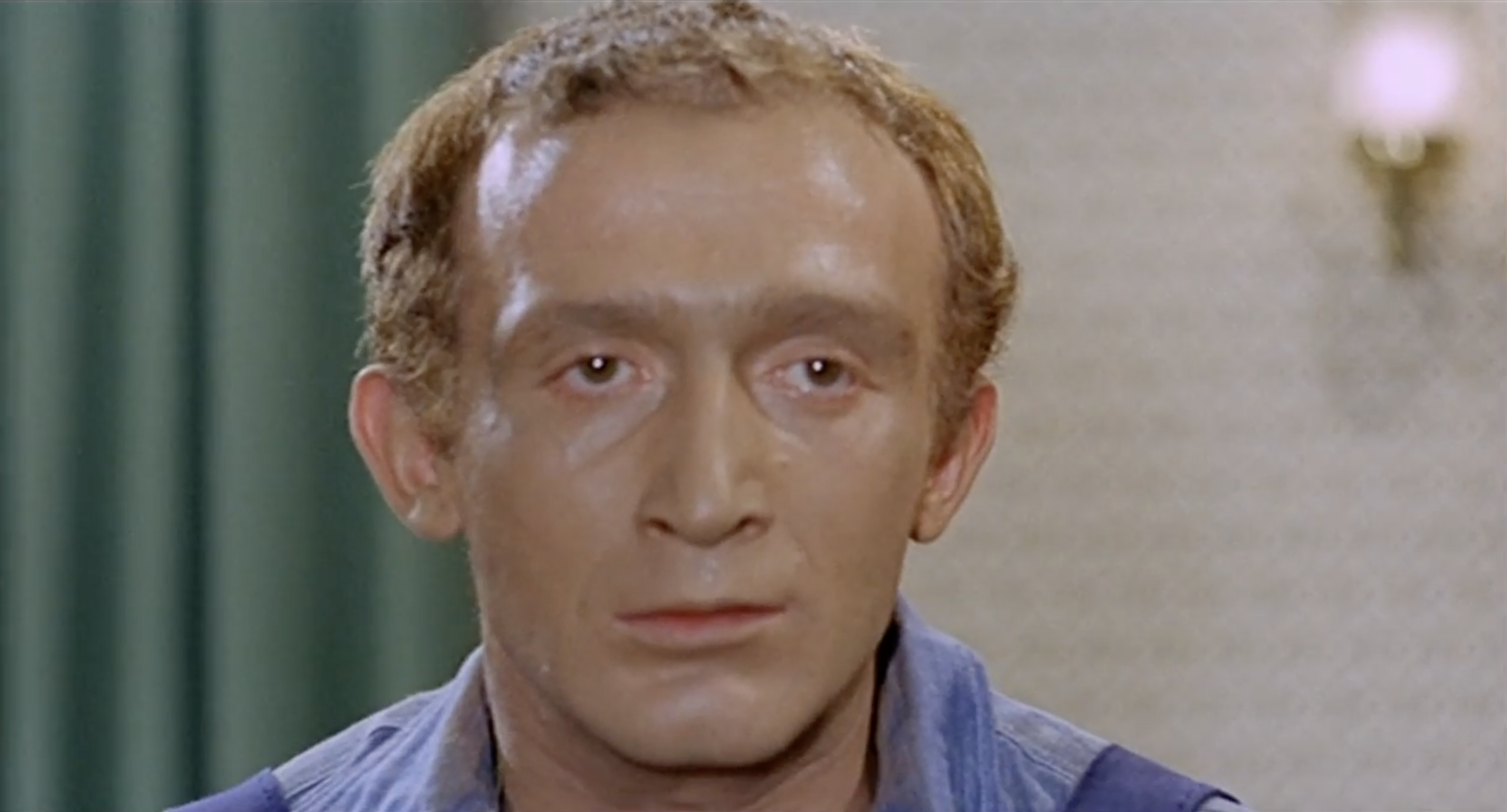
- Colli in Deadly Inheritance (1968)
- Born: 16 May 1940; Biella
- Died: 19 November 1982 (aged 42); Rome

Ernesto Colli (16 May 1940 – 19 November 1982) was an Italian film, television and stage actor.

== Life and career ==
Born in Biella, Colli graduated from liceo classico, then he started acting in some amateur dramatics and starred in two lost Super 8 films. After one year of university he decided to abandon his studies to enroll the Fersen drama school in Rome.

A real life friend of Vittorio Gassman, Colli often acted alongside him, especially on stage, and he made his film debut playing a small role in the Gassman's film The Devil in Love. He then appeared in a large number of movies and TV-series, even if usually in character roles. He was a character actor who acted actively especially during the seventies.

Equipped with a particularly disturbing face, Ernesto Colli always recited customized roles for him, from the crazy to the delinquent and from the possessed to the weird man; probably the films where he had a most significant part were The Pleasure Shop on 7th Avenue and Deadly Inheritance.

The last role he played was that of a porter of a stable in Rome, in the movie Pierino La Peste Alla Riscossa!, shot a few months before his death and in which he already appeared with the face and the physique excavated by disease.

== Selected filmography ==
=== 1960s ===
- Il morbidone (1965) - Monsignor's man (uncredited)
- Pleasant Nights (1966) - Baccio
- The Devil in Love (1966)
- Deadly Inheritance (1968) - Janot
- Lucrezia (1968) - Ambassador Veletto
- Spirits of the Dead (1968) - One of the Manetti brothers - director (segment "Toby Dammit") (uncredited)
- Faustina (1968) - Vespasiano - Lover of Faustina's mother
- Italiani! È severamente proibito servirsi della toilette durante le fermate (1969)
- The Conspiracy of Torture (1969) - Chief Guard (uncredited)

=== 1970s ===
- Belle d'amore (1970) - Magnaccia (uncredited)
- Quella chiara notte d'ottobre (1970)
- Lady Caliph (1970) - A worker
- La Poudre d'escampette (1971)
- Er Più – storia d'amore e di coltello (1971) - Gigi
- Per amore o per forza (1971)
- Maddalena (1971)
- Stanza 17-17 palazzo delle tasse, ufficio imposte (1971) - Parking attendant
- Caliber 9 (1972) - Alfredo Bertolon
- Bronte: cronaca di un massacro che i libri di storia non hanno raccontato (1972)
- Hai sbagliato... dovevi uccidermi subito! (1972) - Dr. Torres
- Decameron nº 3 - Le più belle donne del Boccaccio (1972) - Renutio (segment "The Mummy")
- Winged Devils (1972) - Lieutenant Ernesto del Prete
- The Infamous Column (1972) - Judge
- Rugantino (1973)
- Torso (1973) - Gianni Tomasso, the scarf vendor
- Non ho tempo (1973)
- Hospitals: The White Mafia (1973) - Patient on the bus
- Seven Hours of Violence (1973) - Tomassian
- Buona parte di Paolina (1973)
- Claretta and Ben (1974) - Remengo
- The Antichrist (1974) - Possessed man
- Bello come un arcangelo (1974) - Cicillo, sacristan
- Autopsy (1975) - Ivo
- The Suspect (1975) - Party functionary in Paris
- Giubbe rosse (1975) - Photographer (uncredited)
- The Peaceful Age (1975) - House painter
- Go Gorilla Go (1975) - The watchman of Builder's Yard (uncredited)
- Illustrious Corpses (1976) - Detective on night duty
- Free Hand for a Tough Cop (1976) - Roschetto
- Meet Him and Die (1976) - Settecapelli (Seven hairs)
- Puttana galera! (1976)
- Io tigro, tu tigri, egli tigra (1978) - News anchor (uncredited)
- Il Porno Shop Della Settima Strada (1979) - Bob
- Switch (1979) - The sick
- Pierino la Peste Alla Riscossa! (1982) - Doorman of Via Piccolomini

=== 1980s ===
- Porca vacca (1982) - (final film role)
