= We Are No Angels (1975 film) =

- Directed by: Gianfranco Parolini
- Written by: Antonio Corti; Gianfranco Parolini
- Produced by: Edmondo Amati; Maurizio Amati
- Starring: Michael Coby; Paul L. Smith
- Cinematography: Guglielmo Mancori
- Music by: Sante Maria Romitelli
- Release date: 1975
- Language: Italian

We Are No Angels (Italian: Noi non siamo angeli) is a 1975 Italian comedy film directed by Gianfranco Parolini and starring Michael Coby and Paul L. Smith, a couple formed with the purpose of copying the successful films of the duo Terence Hill and Bud Spencer.

== Plot ==
In the United States of the 1920s, Raphael McDonald is a boxer who fights in some matches being assisted by his brother and works as a mechanic in their own workshop. So when Angel keeps the money Raphael won in his meeting with Black Bull for himself and shows up for work with a new car, an argument occurs between the two in which Raphael is convinced that Angel spent the money while Angel replies that for to earn a lot of it must be invested in more profitable activities.

Meanwhile, in the western town called Highfalls, a confrontation takes place between the progressives and the conservatives supported by the bad Mr. Shark who hides his personal interests behind the principle of tradition and so the mayor, tired of the continuous dispute, announces a race between cars and carriages, the former represent progress and the others tradition.

On the idea of Angel, who manages to convince Raphael, the two go to get Professor Arcangelo and then go to Highfalls and when they arrive in the town square Raphael meets Willy, a lively child who shakes his hand by pricking his palm with thorns and while Angel meets the look of the young Evelyn who returns his every look even as they walk away. Angel's car, however, is not well seen by Shark's men who begin to smear it and this causes the two brothers to start a fight that ends after Raphael sends everyone to the back of a truck that takes them away and so the two brothers, Professor Arcangelo, Willy and Evelyn go for lunch to Linda Sutton, that is the mother of Evelyn as well as of Willy and little sister Polly.

Between small attacks by Shark's men and the numerous teasing of Willy and his little sister Polly, who often make Raphael run (and angry), the first contacts and kisses take place between Angel and Evelyn but unfortunately also Angel (who this time drank the purge of Willy after Raphael) has to run to the bathroom like his brother. Sark's men, however, arrive in large numbers in the city and begin to demolish a wagon of Angel's transport company which, playing on the susceptibility of his brother (still angry with him) manages to make him help him to defeat them in a new fight that involves golf and baseball shots. Raphael, who is still looking for the money he won in the boxing match and which Angel has hidden, first finds a banknote during the fight and then the whole swag inside a music case and keeps it to himself, until he enters a warehouse and finds himself again in front of Black Bull with whom he starts a fight and with whom he soon decides to stop to respect each other. Raphael also does not give in to Angel's requests interested in investing his money and decides to return to town with Black Bull but Polly and Willy, crying, inform him that Shark's men have kidnapped and cooked their little lamb and he attacks them. generating a new brawl which, after degenerating, also involves the two progressive and conservative factions of the country.

The opportunity for the smart Angel to take his brother's money has thus presented itself and in fact he takes advantage of a moment in which Raphael is in contact with several men and throws himself into the fight managing to take the money that he then uses to buy land. But the little lamb still bleats and this makes it clear that Willy and Polly's latest joke was organized by Angel and once he understood that his money is also gone, he doesn't have time to attack his brother who is challenged by Black Bull. in a challenge between two cars and to be raced in the race against the carriages previously called.

Angel and Raphael, however, are unable to start because their car now lacks the engine and so Angel shows Raphael the invention of Professor Arcangelo (a hang glider) and through it they fly towards the end of the race course being first seen by Black Bull, who admired decides to go astray to favor them. Landed near the finish line, they approach a barn where Angel had hidden another car and with that they win the race.

In the final Angel and Raphael quarrel again ending up in the previously purchased land and in a hole near a well where Professor Arcangelo found oil.

== Cast ==
- Michael Coby as Angel
- Paul L. Smith as Raphael
- John Ireland as Mr. Shark
- Woody Strode as Bill "Black Bill"
- Renato Cestiè as Willy
- Fiona Florence as Linda Sutton
- Evelin Kaye as Evelyn Sutton
- Franco Pesce as Professor Berberg
- Fausta Avelli as Polly
- John Bartha as Sheriff

== See also ==
- List of Italian films of 1975

== Sources ==
- Hughes, Howard (2004). Once Upon a Time in the Italian West. I. B. Tauris. ISBN 1-85043-430-1.
