= Gabriella Andreini =

Italian actress and voice actress (1938–2024)

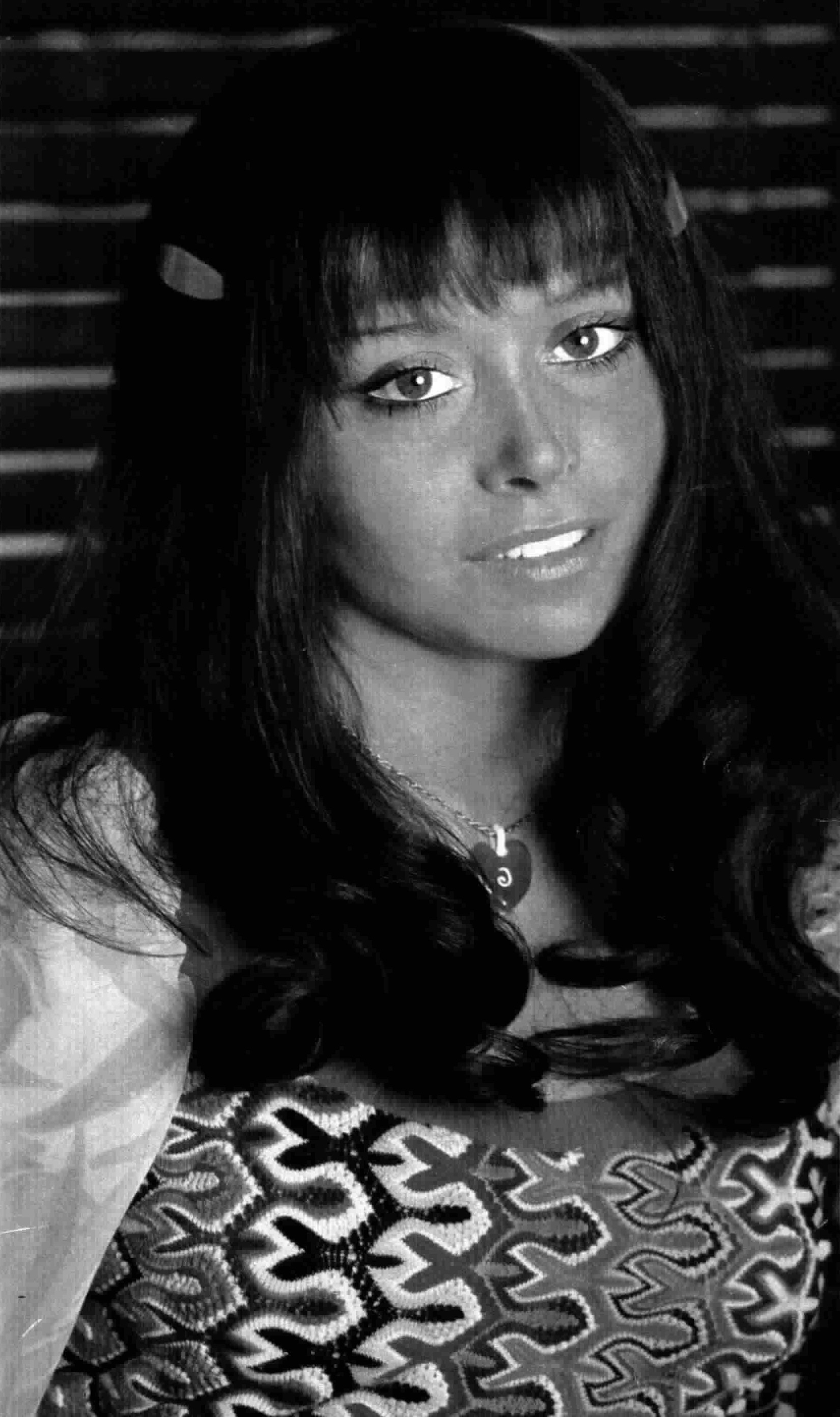
- Gabriella Andreini in 1975
- Born: Gabriella Baistrocchi; 16 April 1938; Naples, Italy
- Died: 28 April 2024 (aged 86)
- Occupations: Actress, voice actress
- Years active: 1957–1980s

Gabriella Andreini (née Baistrocchi; 16 April 1938) is an Italian actress and voice actress. Active in cinema, television, and theatre from the late 1950s through the 1980s, she appeared in numerous films of the commedia all'italiana and adventure genres.

== Biography ==
Andreini was born in Naples on 16 April 1938. The daughter of an army general, she studied acting in Rome at the Accademia Nazionale d'Arte Drammatica Silvio D'Amico. Her early stage work included performances with the Gassman–Randone company in Otello and with Alberto Lupo in Anton Chekhov's Platonov; she also appeared in the musical comedy Io e la margherita alongside Walter Chiari.

She made her television debut in 1957 in Fermenti by Eugene O'Neill, directed by Carlo Ludovico Bragaglia. She later appeared in Un mese in campagna by Ivan Turgenev and in several episodes of Le inchieste del commissario Maigret, directed by Mario Landi.

== Film career ==
Her film career began in the early 1960s, with roles in historical and adventure films such as Invasion 1700 (1962), Toto vs. Maciste (1962), and Captain from Toledo (1965).

Andreini continued to work in cinema throughout the 1970s, with appearances in films such as Carambola's Philosophy: In the Right Pocket (1975) and the television miniseries Ma che cos'è questo amore (1979).

== Selected filmography ==
- Invasion 1700 (1962)
- Toto vs. Maciste (1962)
- Le motorizzate (1963)
- Captain from Toledo (1965)
- Zorro il ribelle (1966)
- Il brigadiere Pasquale Zagaria ama la mamma e la polizia (1973)
- Carambola's Philosophy: In the Right Pocket (1975)
- Ma che cos'è questo amore (TV, 1979)
