= Idoli controluce =

- Directed by: Enzo Battaglia
- Written by: Enzo Battaglia; Franco Prosperi
- Cinematography: Guido Cosulich
- Music by: Ennio Morricone
- Release date: 12 November 1965
- Running time: 97 minutes
- Country: Italy
- Language: Italian

Idoli controluce is a 1965 Italian film directed by Enzo Battaglia.

== Cast ==
- Omar Sivori as himself
- Massimo Girotti as Ugo Sanfelice
- Valeria Ciangottini as Liliana
- Joanna Shimkus as Alexandra
- Riccardo Garrone as Arturo Baldi
- Gaspare Zola as Nanni Moretti
- Angela Freddi as Ada Mauri
- Nicole Tessier as Olivia Cesarini Argan
- John Charles as himself
- Edy Biagetti as Sporting manager
- Giuseppe Adami as himself
- Beppe Barletti as Newspaperman
- Alfredo Dari as Renato Cesarini

== Music ==
Idoli controluce

Soundtrack album by Ennio Morricone
- Released: 1965 (Original album)
- Genre: Soundtrack
- Label: Columbia/EMI

Ennio Morricone chronology
For a Few Dollars More (1965)	Idoli controluce (1965)	The Return of Ringo (1965)

All music by Ennio Morricone.

1. "Le Cose Piu' Importanti" – 2:09 (Lyrics by Sergio Bardotti; Sung by Pierfilippi)
2. "Sophisticated Boy" – 2:06
3. "Le Meno Importanti" – 04:10
4. "Relax In Solitudine" – 2:28
5. "Rendez-Vous" – 2:32
6. "Le Meno Importanti" – 2:23 (version with guitar)
7. "Le Meno Importanti" – 2:03 (version with choir)
