= Desert Raiders =

- Directed by: Tanio Boccia
- Written by: Tanio Boccia; Alberto De Rossi; Mario Moroni
- Produced by: Luigi Rovere
- Starring: Kirk Morris; Rosalba Neri; Hélène Chanel
- Cinematography: Aldo Giordani
- Edited by: Alba Di Salvo
- Music by: Carlo Rustichelli
- Production company: Cineluxor
- Release date: 7 August 1964
- Running time: 105 minutes
- Country: Italy
- Language: Italian

Desert Raiders (Italian: Il dominatore del deserto) is a 1964 Italian adventure film directed by Tanio Boccia and starring Kirk Morris, Rosalba Neri and Hélène Chanel. It was one of a large number of peplum films made during the era.

The story consists of a hero saving a beautiful young princess from a forced marriage to an evil villain.

== Plot ==
The cruel Sultan Yussuf chooses the beautiful Fatima as his wife. To celebrate their wedding, the people are forced to send valuable gifts, which increases discontent among them. Nadir, a young man, discovers that Yussuf is responsible for his mother's death. Fatima, unwilling to marry Yussuf, escapes to the desert where she's rescued by Nadir, and they fall in love. Yussuf offers a reward for Fatima's capture, leading to her abduction. Nadir, with the help of Zais, infiltrates Yussuf's palace and rescues Fatima. They join forces with rebels to overthrow the tyrant. With inside information from Yussuf's jealous favorite, the rebels succeed in taking the city. Nadir defeats Yussuf in a duel, reclaiming Fatima and ending the tyranny.

== Cast ==
- Kirk Morris as Nadir
- Rosalba Neri as Fátima
- Hélène Chanel as Zaira
- Paul Muller as Yussuf
- Aldo Bufi Landi as Salad
- Ugo Sasso as Omar
- Furio Meniconi as El Krim
- Rinaldo Zamperla
- Geneviève Audry as Shireen
- Edda Ferronao
- Franco Pechini
- Nadir Moretti as Ibrahim
- Rina Mascetti
- Luigi Scavran
- Wladimiro Tuicovich

== Bibliography ==
- Susanna Buffa. Un musicista per il cinema: Carlo Rustichelli, un profilo artistico. Carocci, 2004.
