= The Black Sheep (1968 film) =

1968 film

- Directed by: Luciano Salce
- Written by: Ennio De Concini; Adriano Baracco; Luciano Salce
- Produced by: Mario Cecchi Gori
- Cinematography: Aldo Tonti
- Edited by: Marcello Malvestito
- Music by: Luis Enríquez Bacalov
- Release date: 1968
- Country: Italy
- Language: Italian

La pecora nera, internationally released as The Black Sheep, is a 1968 Italian comedy film directed by Luciano Salce.

For his performance Ettore Mattia won the Nastro d'Argento for best supporting actor.

== Plot ==
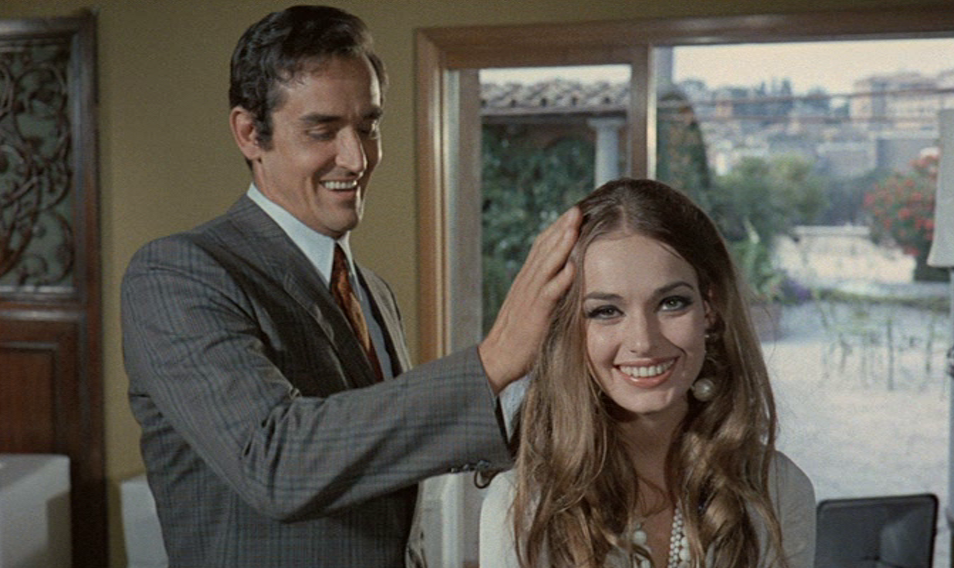
Adrienne La Russa and Vittorio Gassman in The Black Sheep (1968)

Mario and Filippo are twin brothers. One is a small-time schemer who jeopardizes the career of his brother, a respected member of Parliament.

== Cast ==
- Vittorio Gassman: Mario/Filippo Agasti
- Lisa Gastoni: Alma
- Adrienne La Russa: Kitty
- Ettore Mattia: Minister Mattia
- Antonio Centa: Mannocchi
- Umberto D'Orsi: Roberto Franceschini, a.k.a. "Pampero"
- James Riley: Felix Désiré Tombalassa
- Ennio Balbo: Senator Galletti
- Giampiero Albertini: Senator Santarini
- Fiorenzo Fiorentini: commissioner
- Eugene Walter: Priest
