= Carioca tigre =

1976 film directed by Giuliano Carnimeo

- Directed by: Giuliano Carnimeo
- Written by: Leila Buongiorno; Tito Carpi; Luiz Antônio Piá
- Story by: Tito Carpi
- Produced by: Salvatore Argento
- Starring: Aldo Maccione; Michael Coby
- Cinematography: Sebastiano Celeste
- Edited by: Eugenio Alabiso
- Music by: Chico Buarque; Vinicius de Moraes; Toquinho
- Release date: 1976
- Language: Italian

Carioca tigre is a 1976 Italian-Brazilian adventure-comedy film directed by Giuliano Carnimeo and starring Aldo Maccione and Michael Coby.

== Plot ==
Arrived clandestinely in Rio de Janeiro, Carletto runs into the smuggler "Tigre" and his assistant Augusto and being mistaken by the two for a spy he risks being killed until the "Tigre" discovers that Carletto is Italian like him and decides to spare his life appropriating part of the inheritance that Carletto came to collect. From the notary, the three discover that the inheritance consists in a precious pistol stolen from the mafia boss Don Rosolino and hidden in a place called "Capolinea"; the boss wants to retrieve the gun, proof of his murders, and tries to kill Carletto through some hit men and fails. Carletto, Augusto and the "Tigre" set off on a journey and manage to escape from a kidnapping hatched by the boss, giving up the white suit of the "Tiger" to another man who is mistaken for the smuggler. Later, Carletto and Augusto are captured but manage to escape, while the "Tiger" meets a woman who reveals to him that the "Capolinea" is actually a prison duty Carletto's father had been locked up. Don Rosalino also arrives at the penitentiary thanks to the report of a prisoner trying to steal the gun found by the "Tiger" hidden in an aquarium: after a fight the mafia boss is arrested while the three pretending to be police officers manage to escape with the gun. Back in Rio, the "Tigre" and Carletto discover they have won the lottery, but the ticket is in the suit of the "Tigre" given to a man in the forest: the three decide to leave for a new journey.

== Cast ==
- Aldo Maccione as Tigre
- Michael Coby as Carlo Parodi
- Augusto Enrique Alves as Augusto
- Cesar Romero as Don Rosalindo Y Guana
- Luciana Turina as Melisanda
- Luigi Bonos as Talazar
- Milton Gonçalves as Macumbeiro
- Jacques Herlin as Kibbutz
- Grande Otelo as Omero
- Enzo Robutti as Baltazar

== See also ==
- List of Italian films of 1976
