= Una cavalla tutta nuda =

1972 film by Franco Rossetti

- Directed by: Franco Rossetti
- Written by: Franco Rossetti; Francesco Milizia
- Story by: Giovanni Boccaccio: Decameron
- Produced by: Franco Rossetti; Jack Lauder
- Starring: Barbara Bouchet; Don Backy; Renzo Montagnani
- Cinematography: Roberto Girometti
- Edited by: Mario Morra
- Music by: Detto Mariano
- Release date: 1972
- Running time: 100 min
- Country: Italy
- Language: Italian

Una cavalla tutta nuda (literally A Totally Naked Mare) is a 1972 commedia sexy all'italiana directed by Franco Rossetti. It stars Don Backy, Barbara Bouchet, and Renzo Montagnani.

== Plot ==
The story is set in the Middle Ages. The youngsters Folcacchio and Guffardo must bring an embassy to the Bishop of Volterra, and during the trip, the two boys meet the beautiful Gemmata. The woman is a poor peasant who is married to Nicholas. Folcacchio and Guffardo, to have a night of love with the girl, pretend to be magicians who can turn humans into beasts. In fact Gemmata wants to be transformed into a horse to plow the land of her property without fatigue. So Folcacchio and Guffardo invent a magic ritual.

== Cast ==
- Don Backy as Folcacchio de' Folcacchieri
- Barbara Bouchet as Gemmata
- Renzo Montagnani as Gulfardo de' Bardi
- Vittorio Congia as Matias
- Pietro Torrisi as Torello, the 'Stallion'
- Leopoldo Trieste as Nicolò
- Edda Ferronao as Moglie dell'oste
- Carla Romanelli as Pampinea

== Reception ==
La Stampa summed up that the only (and predictable) purpose of the film was to put its story, which was clearly foreshadowed in the title, as frankly as possible into images, which, thanks to the good Barbara Bouchet, was achieved within a modest framework.

Segnalazioni Cinematografiche said that although the film, inspired by the classical sources, was not really badly produced and made, some images and situations seemed reprehensible, and the author also disapproved of the vulgarity of the dialog.

== See also ==
- Carla Romanelli
