= One of the Family (film) =

One Of The Family
- Theatrical release poster
- Directed by: Alessio Maria Federici
- Starring: Pietro Sermonti; Lucia Ocone; Sarah Felberbaum; Nino Frassica
- Cinematography: Roberto Forza
- Edited by: Christian Lombardi
- Music by: Rodrigo D'Erasmo
- Production companies: Warner Bros. Entertainment Italia; Cinemaundici
- Distributed by: Warner Bros. Pictures
- Release date: 25 October 2018
- Running time: 97 minutes
- Country: Italy
- Language: Italian
- Box office: $969,131

One Of The Family (Italian: Uno di famiglia) is a 2018 Italian comedy film directed by Alessio Maria Federici.

== Cast ==
- Pietro Sermonti as Luca
- Lucia Ocone as Zia Angela
- Nino Frassica as Don Peppino Serranò
- Sarah Felberbaum as Regina
- Moisé Curia as Mario
- Neri Marcorè as Alfredo
- Giampiero Judica as Stefano
- Massimo De Lorenzo as Carmine
- Antonio Cantafora as Cicciuzzo
- Vincenzo Leto as Pino Minollo Junior
