= I Chose Love =

1953 French film by Mario Zampi

- Directed by: Mario Zampi
- Written by: Vittorio Calvino; Achille Campanile; C. Campanile; Giorgio Prosperi; Vittorio Veltroni; Mario Zampi
- Starring: Renato Rascel; Marisa Pavan
- Cinematography: Mario Albertelli; Rodolfo Lombardi
- Edited by: Giulio Zampi
- Music by: Roman Vlad
- Production company: Film Costellazione Produzione
- Distributed by: Variety Distribution
- Release date: 23 February 1953
- Running time: 100 minutes
- Countries: France; Italy
- Language: Italian

I Chose Love (French: J'ai choisi l'amour, Italian: Ho scelto l'amore) is a 1953 French-Italian comedy film directed by Mario Zampi and starring Renato Rascel and Marisa Pavan. It was shot at the Cinecittà studios in Rome.

== Plot ==
Boris Popovic, third class undersecretary, accompanies the head of the delegation Ivan Ivanovic and two other delegates to Italy to participate in the Feast of the Brotherhood. Fearful and suspicious of anyone, he has with him a precious "symbol" to be absolutely hidden from the eyes of the curious, a white dove locked in a cage. During a stop on the train, a gust of wind takes away his hat where he has hidden all his money: he goes down to retrieve it, but his sudden departure separates him from the rest of the delegation. The hat with the money is recovered by Mario, an aspiring sacristan accompanied by a priest in the convent, who chases it in vain to try to return it: thanks to a ride in the car, he ends up in Venice but finds himself lost and alone. Having met Marisa, a beautiful flower girl whom he soon falls in love with, he involuntarily frees the dove, symbol of peace in Piazza San Marco, which flies away with the pigeons and seeks help in the party's city headquarters. Due to various misunderstandings, he is chased first by a fanatic Communist and then by a fervent republican. Refugee in the house of the relatives of the flower girl, his mild nature soon leads him into trouble: after having attended a wedding dinner he finds himself in the house of a count where he is coveted by an aristocrat. Discovered by Marisa, he is soon forgiven, but the three of the delegation discover him and, considering him a traitor, they pursue him to bring him back to his homeland. Boris, in the throes of nightmares, is therefore forced to make a decision, which will be the most obvious one: he will stay in Italy with the girl.

== Distribution ==
The film obtained the censorship visa no. 13,743 of February 23, 1953 for a film length of 2,540 meters and had its first screening on March 3, 1953.

== Cast ==
- Renato Rascel: Boris Popovic
- Tina Lattanzi
- Marisa Pavan: Marisa
- Nino Manfredi
- Carlo Mazzarella
- Margherita Bagni: la fioraia
- Dina Perbellini
- Eduardo Passarelli
- Cesco Baseggio
- Giulio Calì
- Pietro Tordi: un comunista
- Michele Abbruzzo
- Ave Ninchi: Giovanna
- Ignazio Leone
- Gianni Rizzo
- Kiki Urbani
- Paolo Panelli
- Frederick Valk
- Gino Cavalieri
- Ettore Mattia

== Bibliography ==
- Parish, Robert. Film Actors Guide. Scarecrow Press, 1977.
