= Deadly Inheritance =

- Directed by: Vittorio Sindoni
- Written by: Romano Migliorini; Vittorio Sindoni; Aldo Bruno
- Produced by: Sergio Baldachinno
- Starring: Tom Drake; Femi Benussi; Ernesto Colli
- Cinematography: Ascenzio Rossi
- Edited by: Maria Schettino
- Music by: Stefano Torossi
- Release date: 1969
- Running time: 81 minutes
- Country: Italy
- Language: Italian

Deadly Inheritance (Italian: Omicidio per vocazione), is a 1969 Italian giallo film directed by Vittorio Sindoni.

== Plot ==
An old man named Oscar is "accidentally" run over by a train in France. According to his will, his heirs must wait until the youngest among them, Janot, reaches the age of 21 before the estate can be settled.

Events begin with our crossing guard switching the points for a scheduled train early one morning. Unfortunately, his hearing aid is on the blink and when the points mysteriously switch back, his next ride proves to be right to the end of the line.

After his death, it turns out that the money he supposedly lost through reckless business speculation is still in his bank account, and amounts very high. This taken as good news for his three daughters, who will have to wait until their sibling Janot comes of age to receive their share.

Youngest Collette (Valeria Ciangottini) does not seem all that bothered by the delay, even if her policeman boyfriend Etienne (Virgilio Gazzolo) is a little disappointed. It is much worse for her sisters though, who are both saddled with far more demanding partners. Dark-haired Simone (Fem Benussi) is having an affair with smarmy club owner Jules (Isarco Ravaioli) and Rosalie (Giovanna Lenzi, billed here as Jeanette Len) is saddled with the obnoxious Leon (Ivo Garrani) who is in deep with a loan shark.

Of course, Janot turns up dead in fairly short order dismembered by a train as well, in another "accident", and a mysterious killer starts working their way through the rest of the cast. Rosalie and her husband meet untimely deaths, then Jules is killed, and a young family member named Collette is next on the killer's list. Enter out of town detective Chief inspector Gerard (Tom Drake) who is not happy with Etienne's investigation, and forces prime suspect Garrani to go on the run, which results in a citywide chase, Garrani convinces Collette to hide him but an unseen assailant axes her to death, and when the police arrive, Garrani flees knowing he will be blamed but when he is cornered on the roof he leaps to his death.

Simone inherits the money. Gerard takes her to catch the train home but it still suspicious. When Simone arrives at home she is attacked by a still alive Janot, who reveals he put Oscar's body in his clothing on the tracks to make it look as though he'd been run over. A number of plot twists pile up to wrong-foot the audience before things are finally resolved and the killer unmasked. He staged his death to hasten his inheritance and killed the others so he would not have to share. He also revealed Jules was his partner in crime but he got rid of him because he planned to blackmail and betray him.

Janot cuts the phone cord when Etienne calls and she tries to warn him, and he forces her to write postcards to make it look as though she is traveling since she is planning to leave town anyway. He also reveals he knew Oscar had tripped earlier and broken his hearing aid.

Simone throws a checkerboard at Janot and flees, trying to lock him in the room. Gerard arrives, but he turns out to be Janot's partner in crime because he is tired of struggling on a cop's salary and he found Janot in a psych ward. Janot does the killing and he does the investigating. Luckily, Etienne has arrived too, and overhears the whole thing and pulls a gun on Gerard from the outside window. Gerard's gun is shot out of his hand, but he tries to flee with Simone as a hostage. Janot opens fire from the upstairs window but Etienne fires back and Janot is hit and falls to his death. Gerard flees. Etienne follows him to the railroad tracks and they end up in a fight in a box car. Gerard overpowers him when the fight leads back outside but Simone shows up and covers them both with a gun. Gerard pleads with her to shoot Etienne and they can run away together and have a good life, but she heeds Etienne's pleas and shoots Gerard instead. The dying Gerard says this was her last chance and she will be alone for the rest of her life. He dies and Simone and Etienne walk away into the night.

== Cast ==
- Tom Drake as Inspector Greville
- Femi Benussi as Simone
- Virgilio Gazzolo as Etienne
- Ernesto Colli as Janot
- Isarco Ravaioli as Jules
- Ivo Garrani as Len
- Valeria Ciangottini as Colette
- Giovanna Lenzi (credited as Jeanette Len) as Rosalie
- Aurelio Marconi
- Andrea Fantasia

== Production ==
Director Vittorio Sindoni stated that the film was initially set to film in France, but ended on location in Anguillara Sabazia, just outside of Rome. The director stated they had tried to pass off the location as Aix-les-Bains. Film critic and historian Roberto Curti stated that the film was low budget and barely had time to complete and mix the film.

== Release ==
Before the film's initial release, the Italian rating board rejected it in January 1968 due to scenes of Femi Benussi nude. It was only distributed the following year in 1969. The film was later re-released as L'assassino ha le mani pulite lit. 'The Killer Has Clean Hands' on home video in the early 1980s.
