= Valeria Ciangottini =

Italian actress

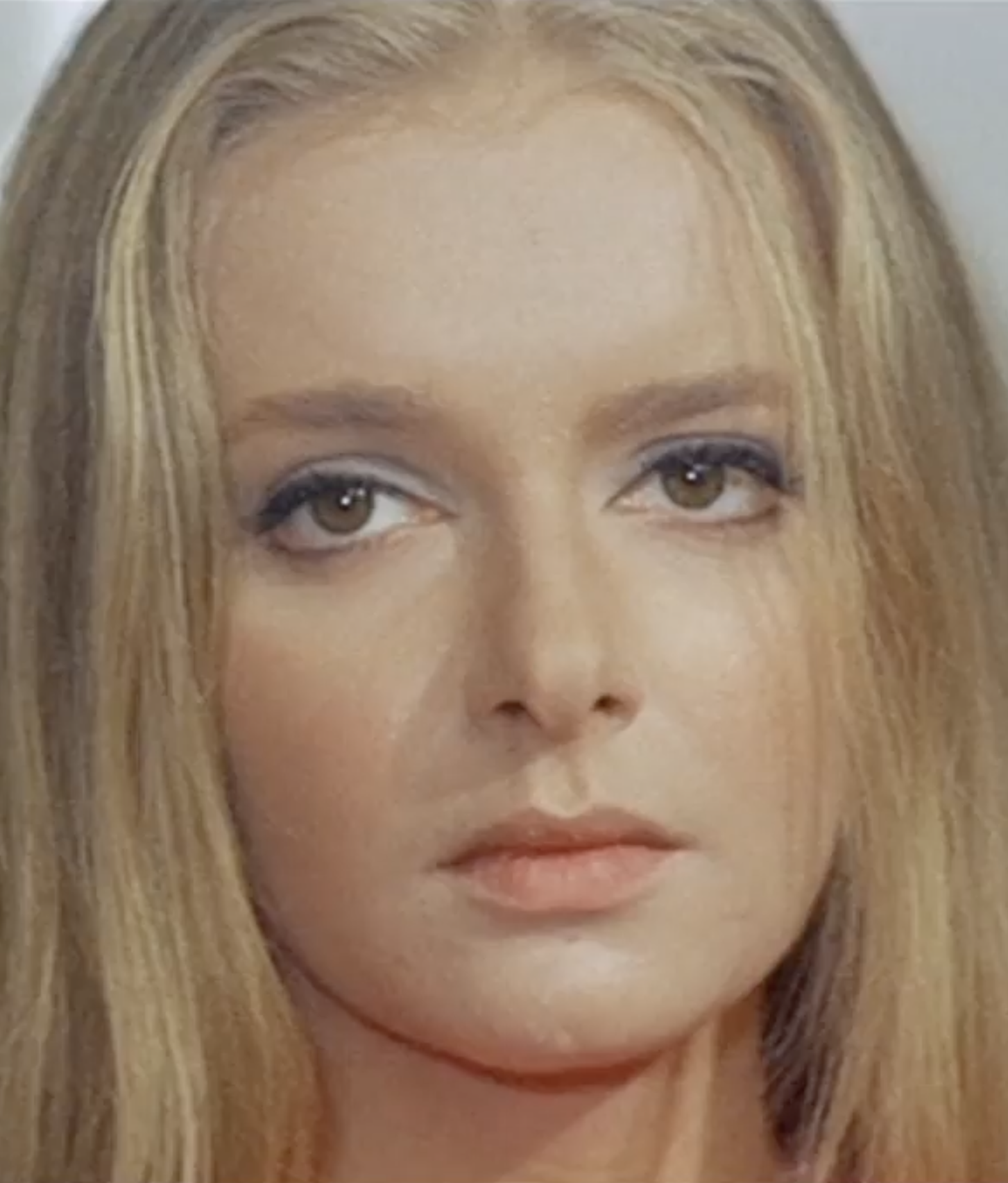
- Ciangottini in Deadly Inheritance (1968)
- Born: 6 August 1945 (age 80); Rome, Kingdom of Italy
- Occupation: Actress

Valeria Ciangottini (born 6 August 1945) is an Italian film, television, and stage actress.

== Life and career ==
Born in Rome, at fourteen years old Ciangottini was chosen by Federico Fellini, after he noticed her at the exit of the school, for the role of Paola in La Dolce Vita (1960). From then she started a successful acting career, being usually cast in the stereotypical role of young, pure, and tender girls. She is also active on television, in which she played main roles in several TV-movies and -series, and she hosted several programs for children. Over the years Ciangottini has essentially focused her career on theater, in particular on comedy plays. She is married to journalist Fabrizio Ricci.

== Selected filmography ==
- La Dolce Vita (1960)
- From a Roman Balcony (1960)
- Don Camillo: Monsignor (1961)
- Family Diary (1962)
- I Giacobini (1962, TV series)
- Vice and Virtue (1963)
- Giuseppe Verdi (1963, TV series)
- Mastro Don Gesualdo (1964, TV series)
- Il treno del sabato (1964)
- Tight Skirts, Loose Pleasures (1965)
- Idoli controluce (1965)
- The Exterminators (1965)
- For a Few Dollars Less (1966)
- Una questione privata (1966)
- A Handful of Heroes (1967)
- The Two Orphans (1965)
- Deadly Inheritance (1968)
- Darling Caroline (1968)
- La legion d'onore (1970, TV-movie)
- Purgatory (1971)
- La pietra di luna (1972, TV series)
- Il commissario De Vincenzi (1974, TV series)
- Il pane altrui (1974, TV-movie)
- Anna Karenina (1974, TV-series)
- The Unnaturals (1976)
- La regia è finita (1977)
- D'improvviso al terzo piano (1977)
- Racconti di fantascienza (1979, TV series)
- Luigi Ganna detective (1979, TV series)
- Il matto (1979)
- Orient-Express (1979, TV series)
- L'ultimo spettacolo di Nora Helmer (1980, TV-movie)
- L'assedio (1980, TV series)
- Il fascino dell'insolito (1982, TV series)
- Il passo falso (1983, TV-movie)
- In punta di piedi (1984)
- Murder of a Moderate Man (1985, TV series)
- L'estate sta finendo (1987)
- Appointment in Liverpool (1988)
- Colletti bianchi (1988, TV series)
- Una storia importante (1988)
- Errore fatale (1992, TV-movie)
- Il maresciallo Rocca (1988, TV series)
- I ragazzi del muretto (1988, TV series)
- Le madri (1988, TV-movie)
- Un posto tranquillo (2003, TV-movie)
- Part Time (2004, TV-movie )
- Amanti e segreti (2004, TV series)
- Famiglia Campione (2004, short)
- Amanti e segreti 2 (2005, TV series)
- L'enigma Tewanna Ray (2006, TV-movie)
- E poi c'è Filippo (2006, TV series)
- Un passo dal cielo (2015, TV series)
- Cronaca di una passione (2016)
