= Perdutamente tuo... mi firmo Macaluso Carmelo fu Giuseppe =

- Directed by: Vittorio Sindoni
- Written by: Ghigo De Chiara; Vittorio Sindoni
- Produced by: Luciano Giotti
- Starring: Stefano Satta Flores; Macha Méril
- Cinematography: Safai Teherani
- Music by: Enrico Simonetti
- Release date: 1976
- Language: Italian

Perdutamente tuo... mi firmo Macaluso Carmelo fu Giuseppe (Italian for "Desperately yours ... I sign Macaluso Carmelo late Giuseppe") is a 1976 satirical comedy film written and directed by Vittorio Sindoni and starring Stefano Satta Flores and Macha Méril.

== Cast ==
- Stefano Satta Flores as Carmelo Macaluso
- Macha Méril as Baroness Valeria Lamia
- Leopoldo Trieste as Don Calogero Liotti
- Cinzia Monreale as Jessica
- Luciano Salce as Baron Alfonso Lamia
- Umberto Orsini as Lawyer Vito Orsini
- Marisa Laurito as Tindara Liotti
- Pino Ferrara as Defense Attorney
- Deddi Savagnone as Don Calogero's Wife
- Roberto Della Casa as Bank Teller

== See also ==
- List of Italian films of 1976
