= Carambola's Philosophy: In the Right Pocket =

1975 film

- Directed by: Ferdinando Baldi
- Screenplay by: Mino Roli; Nico Ducci; Ferdinando Baldi
- Story by: Mino Roli; Nico Ducci
- Produced by: Armando Todaro
- Starring: Michael Coby; Paul Smith
- Cinematography: Aiace Parolin a.i.c.
- Edited by: Antonietta Zita
- Music by: Vince Tempera; Franco Bixio
- Production company: Aetos Produzioni Cinematografiche s.r.l.
- Release date: 1975
- Language: Italian

Carambola's Philosophy: In the Right Pocket (Italian: Carambola filotto.... tutti in buca, also known as The Crazy Adventures of Len and Coby and Trinity and Carambola) is a 1975 Italian comedic Spaghetti Western film co-written and directed by Ferdinando Baldi. Starring the duo Michael Coby and Paul Smith, a couple formed by producer Manolo Bolognini with the purpose of copying the successful films of the duo Terence Hill and Bud Spencer. It is the sequel of Carambola!.

== Plot ==
Coby and Len ride into an Old West ghost town where they find a Gatling gun attached to a motorcycle. An outlaw leader known as The Supreme and his deputy Gonzales as well as another outlaw named Ward go after them. Arriving in a populated town, they create havoc and destroy property, forcing the local sheriff to assign Coby as an assistant to coffin maker Jones and Len as a helper to passionate bakery owner Miss Peabody. A Union Army colonel is also after Coby and Len, aiming to retrieve the Gatling gun.

== Cast ==
- Michael Coby as Coby
- Paul Smith as Len
- Glauco Onorato as The Supreme
- Gabriella Andreini as Miss Peabody
- Ray O'Connor as Gonzales
- Pino Ferrara as sheriff
- Piero Lulli as colonel
- Enzo Monteduro as coffin maker Jones
- Benjamin Lev as sheriff's deputy
- Emilio Messina as Word
- Rodolfo Licari as saloon keeper

Uncredited

- Enzo Maggio as bandit
- Osiride Pevarello as photographer

== See also ==
- List of Italian films of 1975
