= Cinzia Monreale =

Italian actress (born 1957)

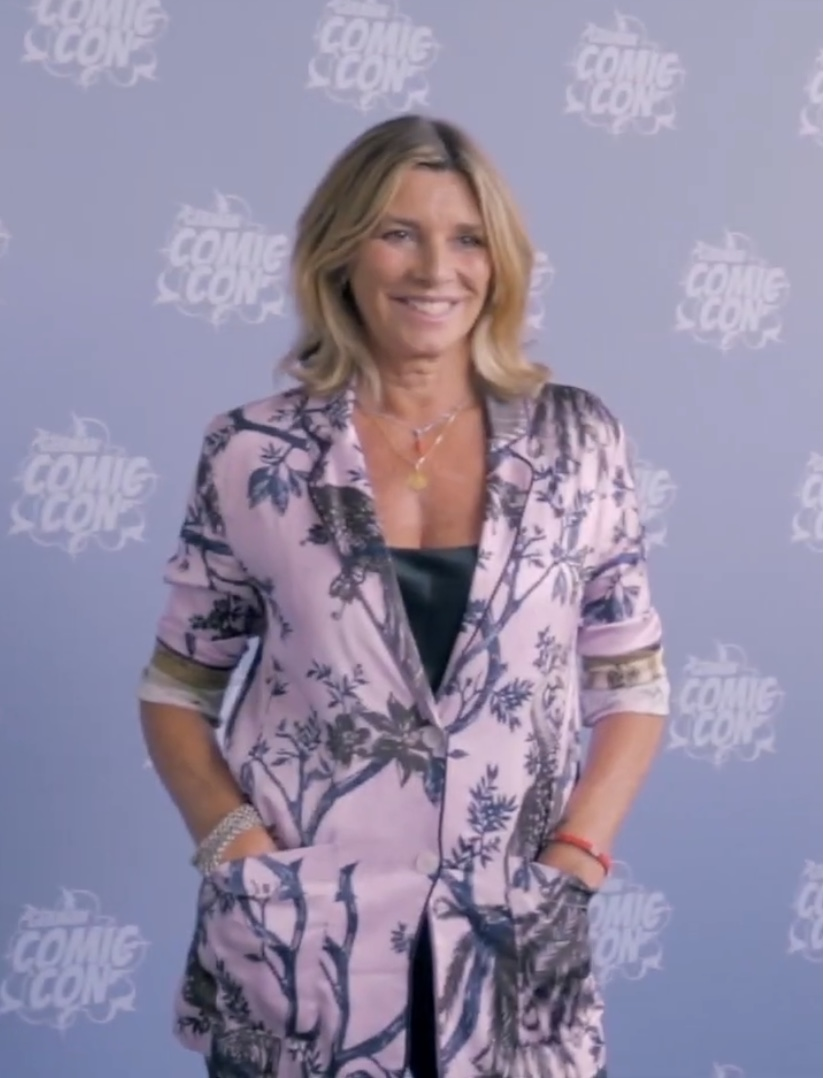
- Monreale in 2021
- Born: Cinzia Moscone; 22 June 1957 (age 69); Genoa, Italy
- Other name: Sarah Keller
- Occupations: Actress; producer
- Years active: 1975–present

Cinzia Monreale (born Cinzia Moscone; 22 June 1957) is an Italian actress best known for her roles in the horror classics Beyond the Darkness and The Beyond.

== Early life ==
Monreale was born in Genoa. She is the daughter of lyric singer Mirella Zaza.

== Career ==
Monreale was active as a runway model before starting her film career. In 1975, at age 17, she made her film debut in a minor role in the Vittorio Sindoni's comedy Son tornate a fiorire le rose, then she got her first main roles again with Sindoni, in the comedies Perdutamente tuo... mi firmo Macaluso Carmelo fu Giuseppe and Per amore di Cesarina.

Monreale appeared in several films throughout the seventies, including the Spaghetti Western Silver Saddle, which was her first time working with famed horror film director Lucio Fulci. In 1979, at age 22, she starred in a leading role with director Joe D'Amato in Buio Omega (Beyond the Darkness), and in 1981, again working with Fulci, she appeared as 'Emily' in the cult horror classic The Beyond, with Catriona MacColl and David Warbeck. Other roles include Joe D'Amato's Return From Death (a.k.a. Frankenstein 2000), Lucio Fulci's Warriors of the Year 2072 and The Sweet House of Horrors, the award-winning Festival directed by Pupi Avati, Under the Skin, and When a Man Loves a Woman.

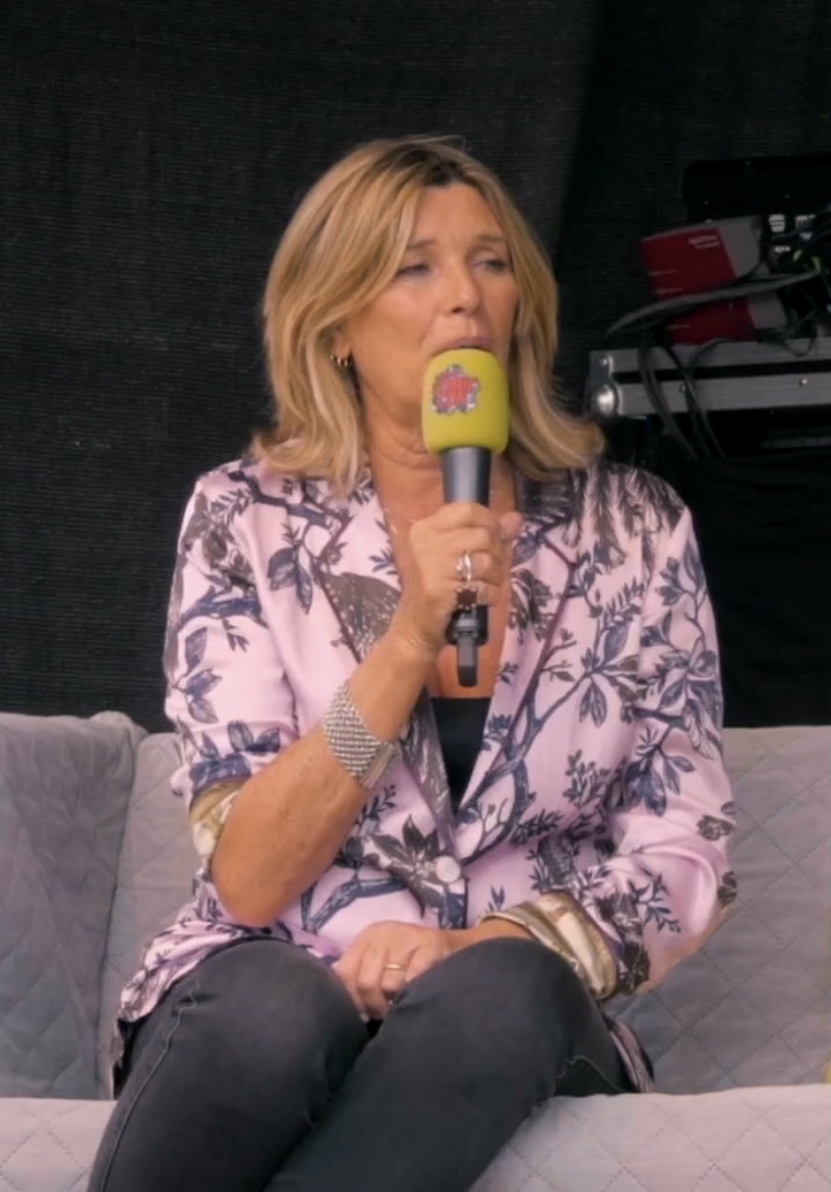
Monreale at the 2021 German Comic Con Limited Edition

Monreale has also worked as a producer. She served as a videographer in the 2005 original documentary Kill Gil: Volume 1 and she produced the 2006 documentary Kill Gil: Volume 2. She has also been involved in TV movies and television series.

== Filmography ==
Year	Title	Role	Notes
1975	Son tornate a fiorire le rose	Gioia	uncredited
1976	Perdutamente tuo... mi firmo Macaluso Carmelo fu Giuseppe	Jessica	
1976	Quel movimento che mi piace tanto	Anna Gilioli	
1976	Per amore di Cesarina	Cesarina	
1978	Silver Saddle (Sella d'argento)	Margaret Barrett	
1978	Bermuda: Cave of the Sharks	Girl on Boat	
1979	Beyond the Darkness (Buio Omega)	Anna Völkl & Elena Völkl	
1980	Flatfoot in Egypt	Connie	
1981	The Beyond	Emily	credited as Sarah Keller
1984	Illusione		
1984	The New Gladiators (I guerrieri dell'anno 2072)	Linda	uncredited
1986	La vallée des peupliers	Christiane	TV series
1987	Under the Chinese Restaurant	La rapinatrice	
1989	The Sweet House of Horrors	Marcia	made for Italian TV film; a.k.a. La dolce casa degli orrori
1992	Return from Death (Frankenstein 2000)	Georgia	
1993	Nel continente nero	Francesca	
1993	Kreola	Jo Ann	
1996	The Stendhal Syndrome	Alfredo Grossi's wife	
1996	Festival		
1997	Mamma per caso		TV mini-series
1999	Il popolo degli uccelli		
2000	Under the Skin		
2000	Turbo		TV series
2000	When a Man Loves a Woman	Gloria	
2001	L'accertamento	Elsa	
2002	La casa dell'angelo	Chicca	television film
2003	The Cruelest Day		
2004	Madre come te		television film
2009	Kommissar Rex		television series; episode: "La mamma è sempre la mamma"
2010	My House Is Full of Mirrors		television film
2024	Compulsion	Madam Karmelina	
