= Edda Ferronao =

Italian actress (1934–1986)

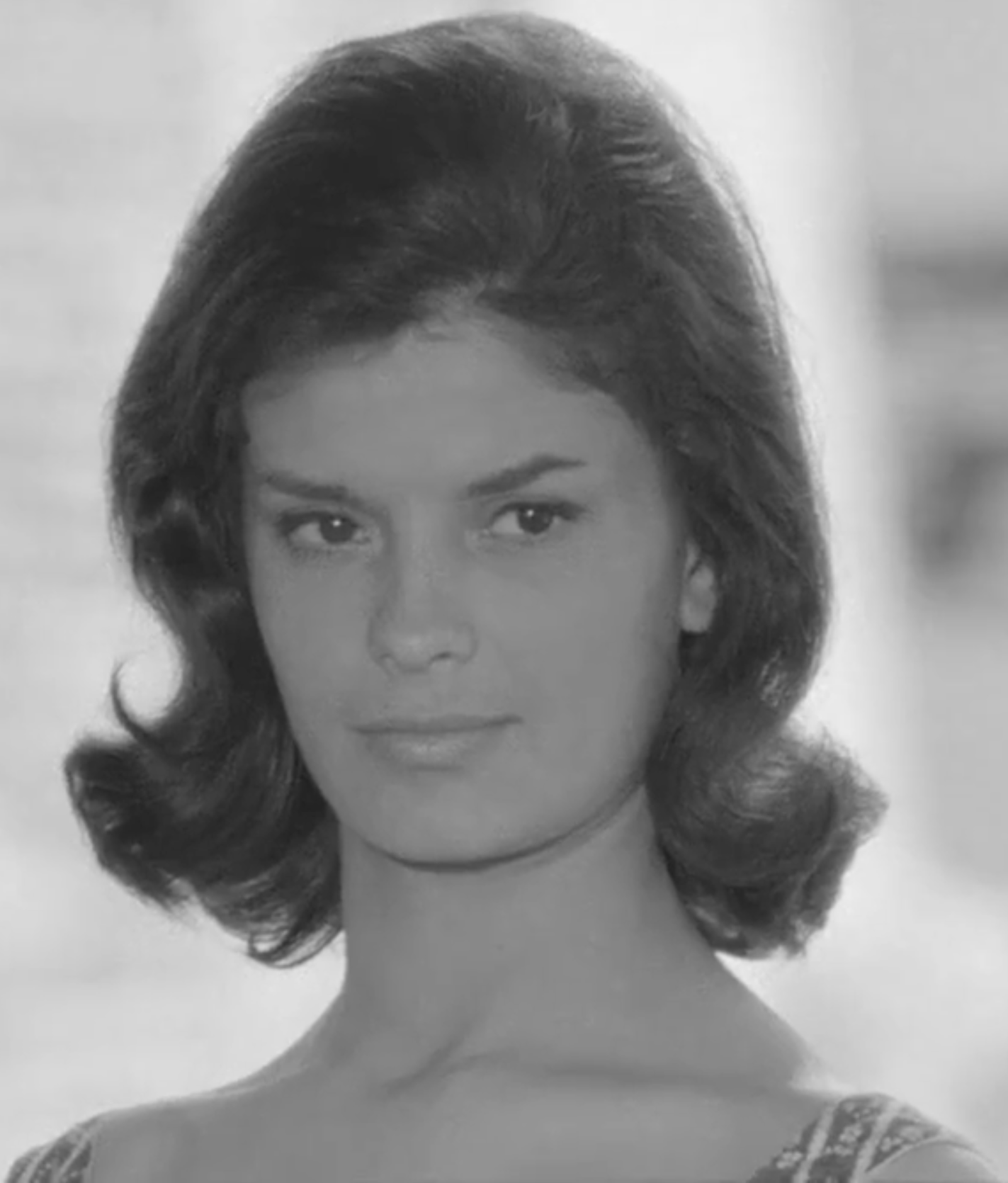
- Ferronao in Il Sorpasso (1962)
- Born: 24 January 1934; Verona, Italy
- Died: 25 January 1986 (aged 52); Rome, Italy
- Occupation: Actress
- Years active: 1957–1985 (film and television)

Edda Ferronao (24 January 1934 – 25 January 1986) was an Italian former stage, film and television actress.

Ferronao died in Rome on 25 January 1986, at the age of 52.

== Filmography ==
| Year | Title | Role | Notes |
|---|---|---|---|
| 1958 | March's Child | Venetian maid | Uncredited |
| 1958 | Toto, Peppino and the Fanatics | Brigitte | Uncredited |
| 1958 | Caporale di giornata | Carmela | Uncredited |
| 1959 | My Wife's Enemy | RCA Worker | Uncredited |
| 1959 | The Great War | | |
| 1960 | Adua and Her Friends | Concetta | Uncredited |
| 1960 | Via Margutta | Mariangela | Uncredited |
| 1960 | Fountain of Trevi | Cliente bella | Uncredited |
| 1960 | The Conqueror of the Orient | Fatima's Maid #1 | |
| 1960 | Everybody Go Home | | |
| 1960 | Il vigile | Filomena | Uncredited |
| 1960 | A Qualcuna Piace Calvo | Invitata | |
| 1961 | Nel blu dipinto di blu | Woman at the Employment Agency | Uncredited |
| 1961 | Man nennt es Amore | Inge | |
| 1961 | Sword of the Conqueror | Woman in Delfo village | |
| 1962 | Slaughter of the Vampires | Doctor's Maid | |
| 1962 | Vulcan, Son of Giove | Erida, Goddess of Hate | |
| 1962 | The Triumph of Robin Hood | Giovanna McLeach | |
| 1962 | Il Sorpasso | La ragazza della valigia smarrita a Civitavecchia | |
| 1962 | March on Rome | Ostessa | |
| 1963 | Le monachine | Waitress | |
| 1963 | The Organizer | Maria | |
| 1963 | I cuori infranti | The Prostitute Virginia | (segment "E vissero felici"), Uncredited |
| 1964 | Let's Talk About Women | Willing Maid | |
| 1964 | Desert Raiders | Meride | |
| 1964 | The Magnificent Cuckold | The younger Maid at the Artusis | |
| 1966 | Ischia operazione amore | The Spa Orderly | |
| 1966 | Amore all'italiana | Pasqualina | Uncredited |
| 1968 | Torture Me But Kill Me with Kisses | Teresa amica di Marisa | |
| 1968 | The Libertine | Maria | |
| 1969 | L'amore è come il sole | | |
| 1969 | I See Naked | | Uncredited |
| 1969 | Madame Bovary | Anastasia | |
| 1969 | Check to the Queen | Maria | |
| 1970 | Lonely Hearts | | |
| 1970 | Una storia d'amore | | |
| 1970 | Ma chi t'ha dato la patente? | | |
| 1970 | Brancaleone at the Crusades | | |
| 1971 | The Blonde in the Blue Movie | Zeigler, Sex Party's Guest | |
| 1971 | Secret Fantasy | Costanza's Relative | |
| 1971 | In the Name of the Italian People | Cameriera di Santenocito | |
| 1972 | The Mattei Affair | Mrs. Mattei | |
| 1972 | Una cavalla tutta nuda | La moglie dell'oste | |
| 1972 | Man Called Amen | Adelaide, Stage Passenger | |
| 1972 | Beati i ricchi | Madre di Lucia | |
| 1972 | Racconti proibiti... di niente vestiti | | |
| 1972 | Il generale dorme in piedi | Suor Celeste | |
| 1972 | Decameroticus | Agnese | |
| 1972 | Amore e ginnastica | | |
| 1973 | Teresa the Thief | | |
| 1973 | Ci risiamo, vero Provvidenza? | Winchester Lady | |
| 1974 | The Devil Is a Woman | Kitchen maid | |
| 1974 | Cugini carnali | | |
| 1974 | Anno uno | Nilde Jotti | |
| 1975 | My Friends | Nun | |
| 1975 | The Boss and the Worker | Wife of Bauer | |
| 1976 | 1900 | Stella's Daughter | |
| 1978 | How to Lose a Wife and Find a Lover | Alfonso's Wife | |
| 1984 | Windsurf - Il vento nelle mani | | |
| 1985 | Woman of Wonders | | (final film role) |

== Bibliography ==
- Bayman, Louis. Directory of World Cinema: Italy. Intellect Books, 2011.
