= ThrillerVideo =

Horror home video series

ThrillerVideo was a horror home video series that began being released in February 1985 to 1987 by U.S.A. Home Video and International Video Entertainment (I.V.E.).

== Background ==
Released on VHS and Betamax, many of the "films" released by ThrillerVideo were actually episodes of the British TV shows Thriller and Hammer House of Horror. Many of the titles in the series were hosted by TV horror hostess Elvira, Mistress of the Dark, who declined to be associated with slasher movies and films involving animal cruelty, so titles such as Make Them Die Slowly, Seven Doors of Death, and Buried Alive as well as later videos featuring episodes of Thriller were simply released without her. Several of the Thriller episodes included two to three minutes of additional footage that was not seen in the original British broadcasts.

== Releases ==
=== Hosted by Elvira ===
- Alabama's Ghost
- Attack of the Swamp Creature
- The Carpathian Eagle
- Charlie Boy
- Children of the Full Moon
- The Cyclops
- Dead of Night (1977)
- Dracula
- Frankenstein
- Growing Pains
- Guardian of the Abyss
- The House That Bled to Death
- The Human Duplicators
- The Monster Club
- NATAS: The Reflection
- The Picture of Dorian Gray
- Rude Awakening
- The Silent Scream
- The Strange Case of Dr. Jekyll and Mr. Hyde
- The Turn of the Screw (1974)
- The Thirteenth Reunion
- The Two Faces of Evil
- Visitor from the Grave
- Witching Time

=== Non-Elvira releases ===
- Anatomy of Terror
- Buried Alive
- Death in Deep Water
- The Devil's Web
- Doctor Butcher, M.D.
- If It's a Man, Hang Up
- I'm the Girl He Wants to Kill
- In the Steps of a Dead Man
- The Invasion of Carol Enders
- A Killer in Every Corner
- Make Them Die Slowly
- Murder Motel
- The Next Victim
- NightStalker
- One Deadly Owner
- Screamer
- Seven Doors of Death
- Tales from the Darkside (seven volumes)
