= The Diamond Peddlers =

1976 film

- Directed by: Giuliano Carnimeo
- Screenplay by: Pier Luigi Alberti; Gabriella Giustini
- Story by: Pier Luigi Alberti; Ugo Tucci; Gabriella Giustini
- Produced by: Ugo Tucci
- Starring: Paul Smith; Michael Coby; Dominic Barto; Jacques Herlin; Giuseppe Maffioli
- Cinematography: Sebastiano Celeste
- Edited by: Amedeo Giomini
- Music by: JUNIPER
- Production company: P.A.C. Produzioni Atlas Cinematografica S.r.l.
- Release date: 1976
- Language: Italian

The Diamond Peddlers (Italian: Il vangelo secondo Simone e Matteo, also known as Diamond Pedlars) is a 1976 Italian comedy film directed by Giuliano Carnimeo and starring Paul Smith and Michael Coby, a comedic duo teamed with the purpose of copying the successful films of Terence Hill and Bud Spencer. It is structured as a sequel to the previous year's Convoy Buddies.

== Plot ==
Toby and Butch, working as pack carriers in Africa, climb through a window into a lodging, discover a gun in a suitcase and, upon stealing and attempting to sell the weapon, are assumed to be criminals or terrorists and find themselves chased by military police through collapsing marketplace stalls. They hide in a village church, dress in priestly cassocks and are tricked by deceitful smugglers into delivering a statue of the Virgin Mary to Amsterdam. The statue is filled with diamonds which the duo unknowingly pass through customs and are subsequently chased through the city's streets and canals by gangsters and the police, with the diamond-filled pouch ultimately landing in the path of a roller-compactor and its contents crushed into dust while Toby and Butch, still in their clerical robes, continue running from their pursuers.

== Cast ==
- Paul Smith as Toby (Simone)
- Michael Coby as Butch (Matteo)
- Dominic Barto as Morgan
- Jacques Herlin as Inspector Nelson
- Giuseppe Maffioli as Priest
- Riccardo Petrazzi as Massimo
- Enrico Chiappafreddo as Morgan's thug
- Emilio Messina as Morgan's thug
- Giovanni Pazzafini as convict
- Franco Pesce as Father Mansueto
- Claudio Gora as Mr. Robinson
- Domenico Di Costanzo
- Claudio Ruffini as convict
- Artemio Antonini
- Roberto Dell'Acqua as fugitive
- Gianlorenzo Bernini
- Andrea Aureli

== See also ==
- List of Italian films of 1976

== Sources ==
- Hughes, Howard (2004). Once Upon a Time in the Italian West. I. B. Tauris. ISBN 1-85043-430-1.
