= Claretta and Ben =

- Directed by: Gian Luigi Polidoro
- Written by: Rafael Azcona; Leo Benvenuti; Piero De Bernardi; Gian Luigi Polidoro
- Produced by: Carlo Ponti
- Cinematography: Mario Vulpiani
- Edited by: Antonio Siciliano
- Music by: Carlo Rustichelli
- Release date: 1974
- Country: Italy
- Language: Italian

Claretta and Ben (Italian: Permettete signora che ami vostra figlia?) is a 1974 Italian comedy film directed by Gian Luigi Polidoro.

== Plot ==
Gino Pistone, manager of a provincial company, makes ends meet as best he can. The company is dissolved by the lead actress and he, to reunite it, has a stroke of genius: to stage the story of Benito Mussolini and his latest lover, Claretta Petacci.

The idea works, and Pistone identifies himself too much in the role of Mussolini.

== Cast ==
- Ugo Tognazzi as Gino Pistone
- Bernadette Lafont as Sandra Pensotti
- Felice Andreasi as Peppino Lo Taglio
- Ernesto Colli as Remengo
- Franco Fabrizi as Franco De Rosa
- Lia Tanzi as Ornella Fiocchi
- Gigi Ballista as friend of Gino
- Luigi Leoni as Carlo Maria
- Germano Longo as Burino
- Ettore Mattia as Falabrino
- Rossana Di Lorenzo as Adriana
- Quinto Parmeggiani as Chimiste
- Pietro Tordi as Naples actor
- Gianfranco Barra as client

== See also ==
- List of Italian films of 1974
