= Paul L. Smith =

American actor (1936–2012)

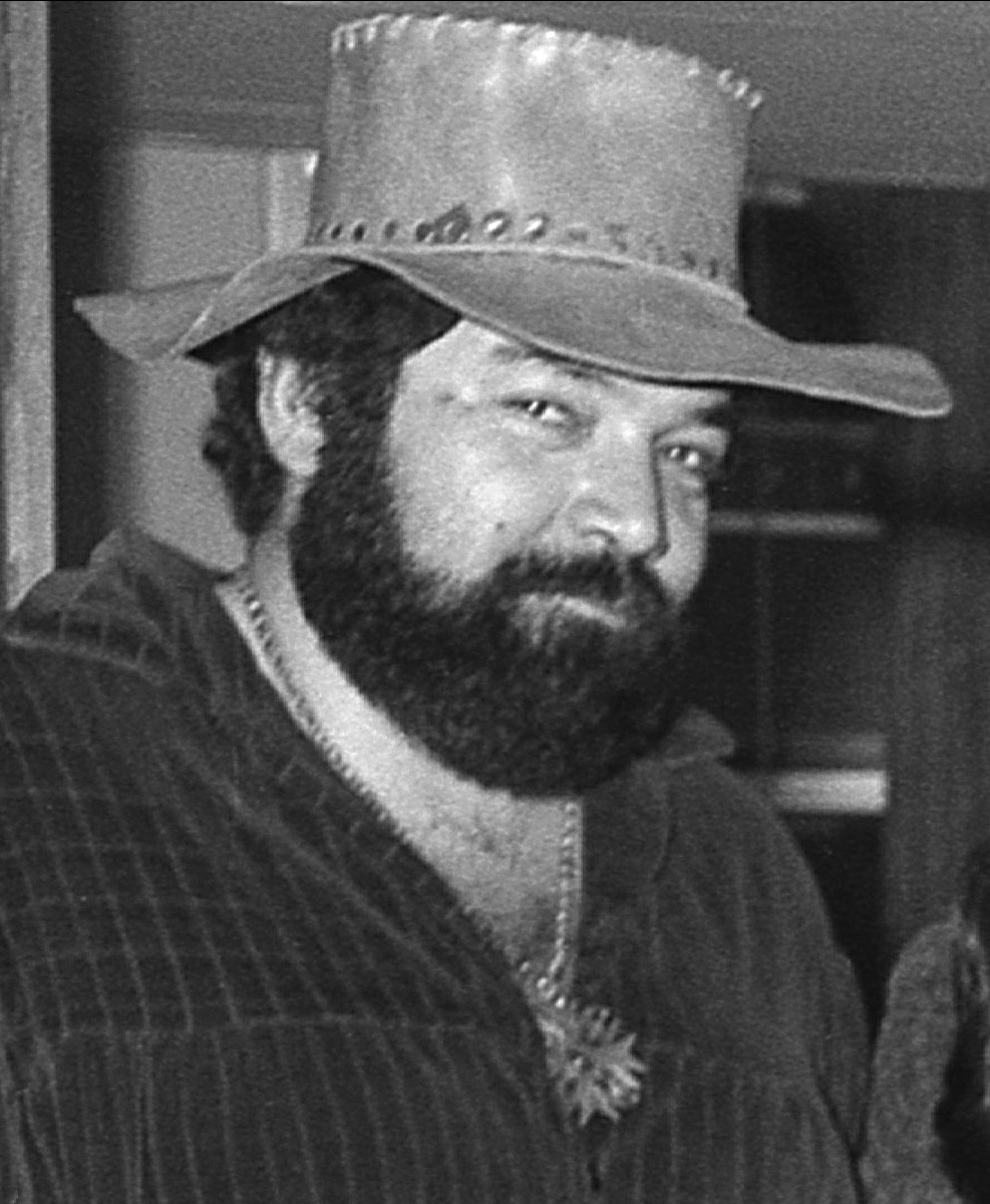
- Smith in 1973
- Born: Paul Lawrence Smith; June 24, 1936; Everett, Massachusetts, U.S.
- Died: April 25, 2012 (aged 75); Ra'anana, Israel
- Other names: Paul Smith; Paul Lawrence Smith; Bob Spencer; Adam Eden
- Education: Brandeis University, Florida State University
- Occupation: Actor
- Years active: 1960–1999
- Spouses: Norma Kalman (div. 1960); Eve Smith (m. ?–2012)
- Children: 1

Paul Lawrence Smith (June 24, 1936 – April 25, 2012) was an American-Israeli actor. Burly, bearded and imposing, he appeared in feature films and occasionally on television since the 1960s, generally playing "heavies" and bad guys. His most notable roles include Hamidou, the vicious prison guard in Midnight Express (1978), Bluto in Robert Altman's Popeye (1980), Gideon in the ABC miniseries Masada (1981), Glossu "Beast" Rabban in David Lynch's Dune (1984) and Falkon in Red Sonja (1985). He was most frequently credited as Paul Smith or Paul L. Smith, but was also billed as P. L. Smith and Paul Lawrence Smith.

== Career ==
Smith's first acting role, at age 24, was in Otto Preminger's 1960 epic Exodus, which was filmed in Israel. This was his first visit to the country. In 1967, Smith returned to Israel as a Mahal volunteer in the Six-Day War and remained for six years, appearing in locally filmed features and television productions. He received director credit on the 1970 documentary Milhemet 20 HaShanim (War of 20 Years) and the 1972 crime drama Jacko Vehayatzaniot (Jacko and the Prostitute or Tel Aviv Call Girls).

Between 1973 and 1977, Smith made a series of Italian films with Michael Coby (pseudonym of Antonio Cantafora), a couple formed with the purpose of copying the successful films of the duo Terence Hill and Bud Spencer. Smith played Bud Spencer-like characters while Coby was a Terence Hill lookalike in Bud & Terence-fashion. One of these films, Convoy Buddies, was selected for American release by Film Ventures International, and producer Edward L. Montoro changed Smith's name to "Bob Spencer" and Cantafora's name to "Terrence Hall". Smith sued, successfully arguing that an actor's name recognition is vital to his career. The judicial system agreed and ruled against FVI, which paid Smith damages and court costs.

Smith made appearances in such films as 21 Hours at Munich (1976), Midnight Express (1978), as Bluto in Popeye (1980), and as Glossu Rabban in Dune (1984). On television, he appeared in such established series as Emergency!, CHiPS, Wonder Woman, Barney Miller and Hawaii Five-O.

== Personal life ==
On April 25, 2012, Smith died in Ra'anana from undisclosed causes, at the age of 75.

== Filmography ==
Year	Title	Role	Notes
1960	Exodus	Jewish Prisoner Peretz Geffner	Uncredited
1963	Have Gun – Will Travel	Sven	Episode: "The Eve of St. Elmo"
1965	Homicide	Dudley Stark	Episode: "Dead on Two"
1970	Alle hatten sich abgewandt	Feister	TV movie
1970	Madron	Gabe Price	Uncredited
1970	Milhemet 20 HaShanim		Director
1971	Fishke Bemilu'im	Shmil	
1972	Nahtche V'Hageneral		Also director
1972	Jacko Vehayatzaniot		
1973	Koreyim Li Shmil	Shmiel	
1973	Gospel Road: A Story of Jesus	Peter	Also production manager
1974	Moses the Lawgiver	Rebel	TV miniseries
1974	Carambola!	Clem Rodovam	
1974	Emergency!	Security Director	Episode: "The Bash"
1974	Alcohol: The Choice		Short film
1975	Carambola's Philosophy: In the Right Pocket	Len	
1975	Convoy Buddies	Simone / Toby	
1975	Conspiracy of Terror	Pound Supervisor	TV movie
1975	We Are No Angels	Raphael McDonald	
1976	The Diamond Peddlers	Simone / Toby	
1976	21 Hours at Munich	Gutfreund	TV movie
1977	Return of the Tiger	Paul the Westerner	
1978	CHiPs	Announcer	Episode: "Disaster Squad"
1978	Midnight Express	Hamidou	
1979	Wonder Woman	Simon Rohan	Episode: "Spaced Out"
1979	Barney Miller	Leon Stipanich	Episode: "Graveyard Shift"
1979	The In-Laws	Mo	
1979	The Frisco Kid	Person on Philadelphia dock	Uncredited
1979	Hawaii Five-O	Andy Kamoku	Episode: "A Lion in the Streets"
1979	Disaster on the Coastliner	Jim Waterman	TV movie
1979	Going in Style	Radio Announcer	Voice
1980	Popeye	Bluto	
1980	The Toni Tennille Show	Self	Episode: "#1.44"
1981	Masada	Gideon	TV miniseries
1981	The Salamander	The Surgeon	
1982	When I Am King	Sir Blackstone Hardtack	
1982	Pieces	Willard	
1983	Sadat	King Farouk	TV miniseries
1983	Raiders in Action	Saul the Priest	
1984	Jungle Warriors	Cesar Santiago	
1984	Dune	Glossu Rabban	
1985	Crimewave	Faron Crush	
1985	The Protector	Mr. Booar	Uncredited
1985	Red Sonja	Falkon	
1985	Sno-Line	Duval	
1986	Haunted Honeymoon	Dr. Paul Abbot	
1987	Gor	Surbus	
1987	Terminal Entry	Stewart	Also associate producer
1988	Outlaw Force	Inspector Wainright	
1988	Death Chase	Steele	
1989	Sonny Boy	Slue	
1989	Ten Little Indians	Elmo Rodgers	
1989	You're Famous	Paul	
1989	The Hired Gun	Wounded Man	
1989	Crazy Camera		
1990	Crossing the Line	Joe Kapinski	
1990	Caged Fury	Head Guard	Also associate producer
1991	Eye of the Widow	Elko	
1992	Desert Kickboxer	Santos	
1994	Maverick	Archduke	
1999	D.R.E.A.M. Team	Vladimir Corzon	TV movie
2008	Paul Smith: The Reddest Herring	Himself	Extended interview featured on the North American DVD release of Pieces, where he discusses the film, his life, and career

== Discography ==
- I'm Mean (1980)

== Sources ==
- Hughes, Howard (2004). Once Upon a Time in the Italian West. I. B. Tauris. ISBN 1-85043-430-1.
