= Antonio Cantafora =

Italian film and television actor (1944–2024)

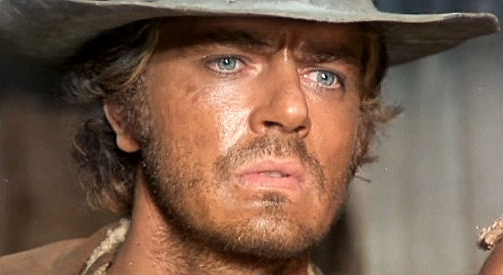
- Cantafora in Carambola's Philosophy: In the Right Pocket (1975)
- Born: 2 February 1944; Crotone, Calabria, Italy
- Died: 20 April 2024 (aged 80); Rome, Lazio, Italy
- Other name: Michael Coby

Antonio Cantafora (2 February 1944 – 20 April 2024) was an Italian actor, also credited under the stage name Michael Coby.

== Life and career ==
Born in Crotone, Calabria, Cantafora studied acting with Alessandro Fersen, then he made his film debut in 1967's The Dirty Outlaws. He appeared in a string of Spaghetti Westerns, including opposite Klaus Kinski in And God Said to Cain (1970) and Black Killer (1971). He took on a number of leading man roles, including in Mario Bava's horror film Baron Blood (1972) and in the Italian-Hong Kong co-production Supermen Against the Orient (1973).

Between 1973 and 1977, he made a series of films with American actor Paul L. Smith, a couple formed with the purpose of copying the successful films of the duo Terence Hill and Bud Spencer. Smith played Bud Spencer-like characters, while Cantafora (under the new stage name 'Michael Coby') was thanks to a vague resemblance a Terence Hill lookalike. In Italy, these films were known as the Simone and Matteo cycle, after the names of their titular characters.

Later Cantafora continued his career mainly as a character actor, working with prominent directors such as Federico Fellini, Dario Argento, Jerzy Skolimowski, Bruno Barreto, Alberto Lattuada, and Mauro Bolognini. He largely retired from acting by the late 2000s, save for a brief comeback in the 2018 comedy One of the Family.

== Personal life ==
After retirement, Cantafora took up painting, and worked with the Calabria Film Commission. At the time of his death, he was developing a project about Pythagoras.

=== Death ===
Cantafora died of a heart attack in Rome on 20 April 2024, aged 80.

== Partial filmography ==
- The Dirty Outlaws (1967) - Bill
- Lo stato d'assedio (1969) - Umberto
- Ombre roventi (1970)
- And God Said to Cain (1970) - Dick Acombar
- Shoot Joe, and Shoot Again (1971) - Jack's Man
- Black Killer (1971) - Ramon O'Hara
- Baron Blood (1972) - Peter Kleist
- Decameron proibitissimo (Boccaccio mio statte zitto) (1972) - Fra' Domenico
- Novelle galeotte d'amore (1972)
- Bounty Hunter in Trinity (1972) - Pizarro
- Metti lo diavolo tuo ne lo mio inferno (1973) - Ricciardetto
- L'affaire Crazy Capo (1973) - Antonio Marchesi
- Supermen Against the Orient (1973) - Max
- ...e continuavano a mettere lo diavolo ne lo inferno (1973) - Ricciardo
- Carambola! (1974) - Toby
- La badessa di Castro (1974) - Giulio Branciforti
- Carambola's Philosophy: In the Right Pocket (1975) - Coby
- Convoy Buddies (1975) - Matteo / Butch
- We Are No Angels (1975) - Angel
- The Diamond Peddlers (1976) - Matteo / Butch
- La casa (1976) - Philip
- Carioca tigre (1976) - Carlo Parodi
- Sahara Cross (1977)
- Enfantasme (1978) - Flavio, le hippy
- Midnight Blue (1979) - Pier Luigi
- Supersonic Man (1979) - Paul
- The Bitch (1979) - Nico Cantafora
- The Cricket (1980) - Alberto 'Cipria' Antonelli
- Gabriela (1983) - Tonico Bastos
- Scream for Help (1984) - Man At Motel
- Demons 2 (1986) - Ingrid's Father
- Puro cashmere (1986) - Jody
- Intervista (1987) - Spouse
- Il coraggio di parlare (1987) - Caporale
- Der Commander (1988) - Nick De Carlo
- Donna d'ombra (1988) - Vincenzo
- Torrents of Spring (1989) - Richter
- Vacanze di Natale '90 (1990) - Pippo
- Il ritorno del grande amico (1990)
- In camera mia (1992) - Mannari
- Giovanni Falcone (1993) - Totuccio Inzerillo
- Power and Lovers (1994) - Toto
- A spasso nel tempo (1996) - Casanova
- Marquise (1997)
- Il decisionista (1997)
- Hammamet Village (1997)
- Buck and the Magic Bracelet (1998) - Sergeant O'Connor
- The Card Player (2004) - Vice Squad Chief Marini
- I Viceré (2007)
- One Of The Family (2018) - Cicciuzzo

== Sources ==
- Hughes, Howard (2004). Once Upon a Time in the Italian West. I. B. Tauris. ISBN 1-85043-430-1.
