= Carambola (film) =

1974 film by Ferdinando Baldi

Carambola!
- Italian theatrical release poster
- Directed by: Ferdinando Baldi
- Screenplay by: Mino Roli; Nico Ducci; Ferdinando Baldi
- Story by: Mino Roli; Nico Ducci
- Produced by: Armando Todaro
- Starring: Paul Smith; Michael Coby
- Cinematography: Aiace Parolin
- Edited by: Antonietta Zita
- Music by: Franco Bixio; Vince Tempera
- Release date: 1974
- Language: Italian

Carambola! (Italian: Carambola, also known as Strange Adventures of Coby and Ben) is a 1974 Italian comedic Spaghetti Western film co-written and directed by Ferdinando Baldi. It was the first film starring the pair Paul Smith and Michael Coby, a duo formed by producer Manolo Bolognini with the purpose of copying the successful films of the duo Terence Hill and Bud Spencer. It was followed by Carambola's Philosophy: In the Right Pocket.

== Plot ==
Coby, a former soldier and champion of pool and his gigantic and irascible friend Clem accepted, for $50.000, to investigate arms trafficking that would take place between the US and Mexico. The two devise a trick.

== Cast ==
- Paul Smith as Clem
- Michael Coby as Coby
- Horst Frank as Clydeson
- William Bogart as Kelly
- Pino Ferrara as sheriff
- Luciano Catenacci as Cpt. Howard Johnson
- Franco Fantasia as professor
- Pedro Sanchez as Mexican leader
- Melissa Chimenti as Pamela
- Gaetano Russo as billiard player
- Pietro Torrisi as murdered warden
- Carla Mancini c.s.c.
- Giovanni Pazzafini as Clydeson's henchman
- Gianlorenzo Bernini as Howard's helper
- Mike Morris
- Luigi Antonio Guerra c.s.c.

Uncredited

- Remo De Angelis as Lt. Stevens
- Fred Robsahm as Sinz, Howard's helper

== See also ==
- List of Italian films of 1974
