= Franco Rossetti =

Italian film director and screenwriter (1930–2018)

- Born: 1 October 1930; Siena, Tuscany, Italy
- Died: 11 June 2018 (aged 87); Rome, Italy
- Other names: Fred Gardner, Frank Ross
- Occupations: Film director, screenwriter

Franco Rossetti (1 October 1930 – 11 June 2018) was an Italian film director and screenwriter.

== Life and career ==
Born in Siena, Rossetti started his career as a film critic, then in the early 1950s he entered the film industry as an assistant director. With the rise of the Spaghetti Western genre, Rossetti developed a solid reputation as a screenwriter, especially thanks to the screenplays of Django, Texas, Adios and Johnny Oro. He made his directorial debut in 1967 with the western The Dirty Outlaws, and then he directed seven more films, spanning different genres. Rossetti died in Rome on 11 June 2018, at the age of 87.

== Filmography ==
- 1967: The Dirty Outlaws
- 1969: Delitto al circolo del tennis
- 1972: Una cavalla tutta nuda
- 1974: Nipoti miei diletti
- 1975: Quel movimento che mi piace tanto
- 1978: Il mondo porno di due sorelle
- 1984: Il lebbroso
- 1984: Al limite, cioè, non glielo dico
