= The Sweet House of Horrors =

1989 television film directed by Lucio Fulci

- DVD cover for The Sweet House of Horrors
- Italian: La dolce casa degli orrori
- Genre: Horror
- Screenplay by: Vincenzo Mannino; Gigliola Battaglini
- Story by: Lucio Fulci
- Directed by: Lucio Fulci
- Starring: Jean-Christophe Brétigniere; Cinzia Monreale; Ilary Blasi; Lubka Cibulova
- Composer: Vince Tempera

Production
- Producers: Massimo Manasse; Marco Grillo Spina
- Cinematography: Nino Celeste
- Editor: Alberto Moriani
- Running time: 84 minutes
- Production companies: Dania Film; Reteitalia

The Sweet House of Horrors (Italian: La dolce casa degli orrori) is an Italian made-for-television horror film directed by Lucio Fulci. The film is about a young couple who are brutally murdered by a burglar and return as spirits to watch over their two young orphaned children, to seek revenge against their murderer, and try to prevent their house from being demolished.

== Plot ==
Mary and Roberto Valdi return home from a party to find a masked intruder ransacking their elegant country house. The masked man attacks and brutally kills both of them and then disguises their deaths as an auto accident by driving their dead bodies to an isolated hilltop in their car and pushing it over the edge.

At their parents' funeral, bereaved children Sarah and Marco exhibit a strange mixture of grief and stifled hilarity, chewing gum while weeping and giggling at the elderly priest conducting the graveside ceremony. The children's Aunt Marcia, Mary Valdi's younger sister, and Uncle Carlo, her husband, decide to stay with the children at the Valdi house. At the same time, arrangements are made to sell the property. When Carlo is called away on business, Marcia spends an uneasy night at the Valdi house without him. Disturbed during the night, she explores the attic and is frightened by a giant toy fly that seems to attack her.

Over the next few days, Sarah and Marco are adamant that they wish to continue living at the house and are openly hostile to Mr. Colby, the real estate agent whom Carlo brings to the house. When the overweight Mr. Colby suffers an accident after falling down a flight of stairs, the children laugh maliciously. Meanwhile, the Valdi's gardener, Guido, observes the events with suspicion. A flashback recalled by Guido reveals that he was the masked intruder who broke into the house to rob it, only to be surprised when his employers returned sooner than anticipated, and he was forced to kill them. Elsewhere, Marcia becomes more and more scared of the house, and supernatural presences make themselves felt.

That night, Sarah and Marco are visited by floating flames in their beds, which they suspect represent their dead parents. The following morning, Guido is about to accept a generous check from Carlo for the house's renovation when a violent flashback, brought on by the supernatural forces within the house, shocks him into screaming his guilt for all to hear. He runs off and accidentally gets run over and killed by an oncoming truck on the road.

The injured Mr. Colby returns the following day, but a violent windstorm attacks him in the hallway. Supernatural flames appear and heat up his crutches, burning his hands, making him fall down. Terrified but defiant, he leaves the house again. That evening, Sarah and Marco conduct a masked ritual to contact the spirit world. They ask their parents to manifest themselves and to look after them. Their wish is somehow granted, and their parents' ghosts greet them. Sarah and Marco are finally happy and able to spend more time with their loving but non-corporeal parents at any time they wish. But Marcia and Carlo cannot see the ghosts, and they try to bundle the children into their car, intending to leave the house and return to their own home. However, a ghostly fog prevents them from getting very far, and they are forced to return. The frightened couple brings in a medium, an arrogant, caped 'spirit challenger' to exercise the house of the children's parents.

After a brief skirmish with the ghostly forces in the house, the spiritualist returns with a wrecking crew and a giant bulldozer and again commands the spirits of Mary and Roberto to leave the house before it is smashed to rubble. For a while, the children try to inhabit an old lean-to playhouse they'd constructed, while the spiritualist, Mr. Colby, Marcia, and Carlo are outside trying to persuade them to leave the building. The spirits of Sarah and Marco's parents enter two small stones as a way of staying with them forever wherever they go. The children finally walk out of the house, where the spiritualist sees them hiding something in their pockets and tries to confiscate the stones. But when he picks up one, his right hand is melted away as he screams in agony. The family of living children and ghostly parents will apparently remain together.

== Production ==
The Sweet House of Horrors is one of four films made for the Italian television series La case maledette (transl. The Houses of Doom). The series was developed by Luciano Martino following the release of Brivido Giallo. The series was intended to be part of six films to be directed by Fulci, Umberto Lenzi and Lamberto Bava. Due to other commitments, Bava stepped out of the project to be replaced by Marcello Avallone, who also dropped out of the project leading to only four films being made. For his two films, Fulci asked to replace the two stories he was given with two of his own design. The films were shot on 16 mm film outside of Rome on a schedule of four weeks each.

Immediately after finishing work on his first film in the series The House of Clocks on February 25, 1989, Fulci started work on The Sweet House of Horrors which finished filming in March. The film was shot in Ponte Pattoli. The information in the film's credits and the facade seen in the film indicate the filming location "Agriturismo Il Covone" in Ponte Pattoli. A last minute casting change happened involving Alexander Vernon Dobtcheff replacing Cosimo Cinieri.

== Release ==
Along with the other films made for La case maledette, The Sweet House of Horrors was shelved. When asked about the films being released in the early 1990s, Fulci responded that the series had been sold to elsewhere in the world, they would have to ask Reiteitalia when they would be shown in Italy. The films were only shown in 2000 in Italy when they were released on VHS thanks to the efforts of the magazine Nocturno Cinema. It was screened on Quadrifoglio Odeon TV on January 13, 2001. They were shown on Italian satellite television in 2006. The film was released on DVD in the United States by Shriek Show on November 19, 2002.

Fulci spoke very positively on his two films made for La case maledette, calling them "Fantastic! Excellent Filmmaking!" and that they were "Two of his best films [he'd] made!".
