= Beyond the Darkness (film) =

1979 Italian horror film directed by Joe D'Amato

- Italian film poster by Renato Casaro
- Italian: Buio Omega
- Directed by: Joe D'Amato
- Screenplay by: Ottavio Fabbri
- Story by: Giacomo Guerrini
- Based on: The Third Eye (1966 film) by: Mino Guerrini; Piero Regnoli
- Produced by: Dario Rossetti; Ermanno Donati
- Starring: Kieran Canter; Cinzia Monreale; Franca Stoppi; Sam Modesto
- Cinematography: Joe D'Amato
- Edited by: Ornella Micheli
- Music by: Goblin
- Production company: D.R. Per le Comunicazioni di Massa
- Release date: 15 November 1979 (Italy)
- Running time: 94 minutes
- Country: Italy
- Language: Italian
- Box office: ₤153.7 million

Beyond the Darkness (Italian: Buio Omega, lit. 'Omega Darkness') is a 1979 Italian exploitation horror film directed by Joe D'Amato. It follows Francesco Koch (Kieran Canter), an orphaned taxidermist who inherits a house in the woods where he lives with his housekeeper Iris (Franca Stoppi), who is determined to become the new owner. After Iris kills his girlfriend Anna (Cinzia Monreale) with a voodoo curse, Francesco steals her corpse from the local cemetery. He then commits murders connected to his enduring passion for her. A local undertaker (Sam Modesto) investigates and meets Teodora (also Monreale), Anna's twin sister.

Filmed in two weeks in South Tyrol, Beyond the Darkness is a remake of the 1966 film The Third Eye. It was released in Italy to what Italian film historian Roberto Curti described as relatively poor box office, and was re-released in Italy in 1987 as In quella casa Buio omega to associate it with the La casa film series.

== Plot ==
Since his parents died in a car accident nine years before, the affluent Francesco Koch (Note: In the Italian version, he is twenty-five years old. In the English version, he is a 22-year-old.) has been living with his wet nurse and housekeeper Iris in a villa at the outskirts of a South Tyrolian town. Wanting to marry Francesco and become the new lady of the house, Iris hires a witch to curse his fiancée, Anna. When the witch sticks needles into a voodoo doll, Anna falls ill. At a hospital, Anna reveals she wants to make love with Francesco at least once before she dies. As he kisses Anna, her heart stops beating and she dies. At the villa, Francesco mourns his loss. Iris later breastfeeds Francesco, calling him her "little baby boy".

At the morgue, Francesco injects Anna's body with preservatives. Unbeknownst to Francesco, the mortician sees him making the injection. The funeral is attended by Francesco, Anna's parents and her twin sister Teodora, who studies at a nearby school.

At night, Francesco drives to the cemetery and digs up Anna's body. While Francesco has to change a blown tire on the ride home, a tourist hitchhiker (Note: In the Italian version, she is American. In the English version, she is British.) enters the car, and due to the presence of a police car, Francesco is forced to take her with him. After smoking a joint, she falls asleep in the car. At the villa, Francesco unloads Anna's body and starts disemboweling it in his workshop. In the process, he bites into her heart and installs glass eyes into the sockets. After waking up and spotting the corpse, the hitchhiker panics. A struggle ensues, in which she scratches Francesco, who in turn rips off some of her fingernails with pliers. He then chokes her to death.

Iris and Francesco dress up Anna's body and put her on one side of a double bed. Assisted by Francesco, Iris chops up the hitchhiker's corpse and dissolves the pieces in a bathtub filled with acid, then disposes of the liquid in a hole in the garden. She later eats tripe in a way that reminds Francesco of the dissolved body and makes him vomit. This makes her laugh. Later, as he sits at the bedside looking at Anna's corpse, Iris approaches Francesco and masturbates him.

Days later, a jogger twists her ankle near Francesco's home, and he invites her in. They have sex on his bed, until Francesco reveals Anna's corpse right next to them. Another fight ensues. Francesco bites her neck and eats a chunk of her flesh. He and Iris burn her corpse in the furnace downstairs. When Iris threatens to dispose of Anna's body, Francesco gives in and offers to marry her and make her mistress of the house.

Iris invites her old relatives to dinner and announces her engagement to Francesco. Yet Francesco leaves her humiliated. The following day, while Iris is drunk and Francesco is out for a jog, the mortician enters the house to investigate, discovers Anna's body, photographs it and leaves. That night, Francesco picks up a woman at a disco but sends her off after seeing Teodora. When alone in a room, darkness falls in and she can hear Anna's voice warning her of a curse on the house. Walking down the stairs, she spots Anna's corpse sitting on a chair in the hall. Iris, who fears Francesco will actually marry Teodora, opens the door holding a knife, forming a silhouette that makes Teodora faint. As Iris is about to stab her, Francesco intervenes. In the ensuing fight, Iris stabs him on his hand and near his groin. He in turn wrestles her to the floor and bites a cheek off. She gouges out his left eye, and he stabs her in the heart, killing her. Francesco listens to Teodora's heartbeat, then carries her downstairs. After incinerating Anna's body, he dresses and makes up Teodora like Anna's corpse.

When the mortician returns, he finds Iris' corpse and Francesco badly injured near the furnace burning with human remains. As Francesco collapses and dies, the mortician takes Teodora, whom he thinks to be Anna's corpse, returns to the cemetery and places her in a coffin for burial. While he and his assistant are about to nail down the lid, Teodora pushes the coffin open and lets out a scream.

== Cast ==
- Kieran Canter as Francesco Koch ('Frank Wyler' in the English dub)
- Cinzia Monreale as Anna Völkl / Teodora Völkl ('Elenor Völkl' in the English dub)
- Franca Stoppi as Iris
- Sam Modesto as Mr. Kyle
- Anna Cardini as Jogging victim
- Lucia D'Elia as Jan
- Mario Pezzin as Priest
- Simonetta Allodi as Disco girl
- Walter Tribus as Dealer
- Klaus Rainer as Doctor
- Edmondo Vallini as Police inspector

== Production ==
Beyond the Darkness was a remake of the 1966 film The Third Eye, which had Franco Nero as its protagonist. Its director Mino Guerrini was friends with D'Amato, and they had devised a number of unfilmed stories together. For the new screenplay, Ottavio Fabbri is credited.

The film was shot in two weeks in South Tyrol province, in the towns of Brixen and Sand in Taufers, in late June and early July 1979. On working with D'Amato, actress Franca Stoppi recalled him saying on set that "We're making a movie to make people throw up. We must make 'em vomit!" D'Amato said in an interview "I personally opted for the most unrestrained gore, since I don't consider myself very skillful at creating suspense....It's my most successful horror movie, and still stands out today above many others of its kind. It did very well commercially."

The special effects for the gore scenes in the film were made by using animal intestines, pig skin and a sheep's heart which were provided by an abattoir. D'Amato said "In all four (of my) horror films....we created the splatter effects by using butcher's scraps. There was no real special effects expert....At that time, censorship was fairly mild". D'Amato said the Italian prints were edited a bit, mainly shortening "the embalming scene and the one of the girl who gets cut to pieces in the bath...."

The film's score was by Goblin, who were hired by producer Marco Rossetti, and included music that would later be re-used in The Other Hell and Hell of the Living Dead.

== Release ==
Beyond the Darkness was distributed theatrically in Italy by Eurocopfilms on 15 November 1979. The film grossed a total of 153.7 million Italian lire domestically. Italian film historian Roberto Curti stated that Beyond the Darkness performed "rather poorly at the Italian box office". The film has been released in a myriad of titles abroad, the most well-known being Beyond the Darkness. A version of the film was released in the United States titled Buried Alive in 1985 by ThrillerVideo. This version of the film has anglicized the names of the characters and is missing parts of the Italian theatrical version.

In the United States, the film had a theatrical release under the title Buried Alive through Aquarius Releasing in 1984.

In Italy, the film was re-released in 1987 as In quella casa Buio omega in an attempt to pass the film off as being related to the American films The Evil Dead and Evil Dead II which were released in Italy as La casa and La casa 2. In Spain, the film was marketed as being a sequel in the House franchise as House 6: El terror continua and in Mexico as part of the Zombi series of film as Zombi 10.

== Reception ==
From retrospective reviews, in his 2001 book reviewing gory horror films from the decade, Scott Aaron Stine declared that Beyond the Darkness was D'Amato's "strongest contributions to the [horror] genre", while still finding the film to be "cheap Italian trash [...] but it approaches the subject with a certain amount of flair not found in similar productions." Danny Shipka, who in 2011 authored a book on exploitation films from Italy, France and Spain commented on the film, referring to it as "one sick puppy" and noting it "doesn't purport to offer any deep insight other than revulsion, and if the test of good Eurocult is to make the viewer wish he had a bath after watching one of its films, than [sic] Buio omega would be a classic."
