= Vittorio Sindoni =

Italian director and screenwriter (born 1939)

- Born: 21 April 1939 (age 87); Capo d'Orlando, Italy
- Occupations: Director; Screenwriter

Vittorio Sindoni (born 21 April 1939) is an Italian director and screenwriter.

== Life and career ==
Born in Capo d'Orlando, Sicily, Sindoni started his career on stage directing the theater group "Il Collettivo" ("The Collective") in Rome, and worked for some years as author of several RAI cultural programs. In the late 1960s he entered the film industry as director and screenwriter, directing numerous comedies. He is known to Italian giallo fans for his 1968 film Deadly Inheritance. For his film Gli anni struggenti he won the Mario Gromo Plate at the 1979 Grolle d'oro Awards. Since the 1980s he devoted himself to television.

== Selected filmography ==
- Deadly Inheritance (1969)
- The Lady Has Been Raped (1973)
- Don't Hurt Me, My Love (1974)
- Per amore di Cesarina (1976)
- Perdutamente tuo... mi firmo Macaluso Carmelo fu Giuseppe (1976)
- Positano (1996, TV)
- Non lasciamoci più (1999-2001, TV)
- Butta la luna (2006-2009, TV)
