= Villas of the Papal Nobility =

Villas of the Papal Nobility (Italian: Ville della nobiltà pontificia nel Lazio) is a serial site submitted by Italy to the UNESCO Tentative List of World Heritage Sites on June 1, 2006. The nomination includes a collection of suburban villas and stately homes constructed from the second half of the 16th century onwards for the higher clergy, cardinals, and aristocratic families connected to the Papal Court in Rome.

The villas are recognized for forming a "high level residential system" that profoundly influenced the development of the Lazio countryside through their grand architecture, formal Italian gardens, and sophisticated integration with the natural landscape.

== Description and Outstanding Universal Value ==
The villas represent a unique period of cultural and architectural expression in the Papal States, particularly during the late Renaissance and the rise of the Baroque style. They served as symbols of political strength and dynastic accomplishment for the families who commissioned them, reflecting the zenith of the temporal power and wealth of the papacy.

The main common feature is the great importance accorded to the vast parklands, where highly engineered water works (giochi d'acqua), elaborate nymphaea, and large-scale terracing perfectly integrated the "artificial" formal gardens into the pre-existing natural environment.

=== Architectural and Artistic Significance ===
The development of these villas involved the most celebrated architects and artists of the era.

- Architects: Works include designs by Baldassarre Peruzzi, Antonio da Sangallo the Younger, Vignola, Giacomo della Porta, Carlo Maderno, Gian Lorenzo Bernini, Francesco Borromini, and Luigi Vanvitelli.
- Artists: Decorations feature frescoes and works by artists such as Taddeo Zuccari and Federico Zuccari, Domenichino, Pietro da Cortona, and Giovanni Paolo Pannini.

=== Comparison with Similar Properties ===
The Lazio ‘Ville Pontificie’ are geographically and typologically comparable to other World Heritage serial sites in Italy, such as the Palladian Villas of Veneto and the Medici Villas and Gardens in Tuscany. However, the Papal Villas are distinct due to:

- A greater architectural variety, having been built over a longer period.
- A primary function centred on social activities, entertainment, and the projection of status, rather than agriculture.
- A unique, dramatic relationship with the surrounding natural landscape (particularly the volcanic Alban Hills), which was consciously incorporated into the design.

== Component Estates ==
The serial nomination is divided between villas located in two main areas of the Lazio region: the Ville Tuscolane (Roman Castles area) and the area around Viterbo.

=== Province of Rome (Colli Tuscolani) ===
This area, appreciated since Ancient Roman times, hosts numerous villas famous for their dramatic water features and views toward Rome.

- Villa Mondragone (Monte Porzio Catone): Built over the Roman Villa dei Quintili, works by Vignola, completed by Martino Longhi the Elder, with 17th-century additions by Carlo Maderno, Giovanni Fontana, and Vasanzio. Famous for the "Giardino della girandola" and monumental nymphaeum.
- Villa Taverna Parisi (Monte Porzio Catone): Nymphaeum connected to the upper formal garden by a double staircase; renovations by Girolamo Rainaldi.
- Villa Falconieri (Frascati): The oldest of the Tuscolan villas (originally Villa Rufina), enlarged by Francesco Borromini. Features a suggestive lake lined with cypress trees.
- Villa Tuscolana (Frascati): Restructured by Luigi Vanvitelli; the park was redesigned in the 19th century by Lucien Bonaparte.
- Villa Aldobrandini (Frascati): Known for its complex design of monumental fountains and the grandiose Teatro delle Acque (Theatre of Waters), with contributions from Giacomo Della Porta, Carlo Maderno, and Giovanni Fontana.
- Villa Lancellotti (Frascati)
- Villa Sora (Frascati)
- Villa Torlonia, Frascati (Frascati): Gardens remain largely unmarked and maintain an impressive theatre of waters.
- Villa Grazioli (Grottaferrata): Noteworthy for its gallery decorated by Giovanni Paolo Pannini.
- Villa Arrigoni-Muti (Grottaferrata): Park shows historical stratification of landscape gardening.
- Palazzo Chigi (Ariccia): A 16th-century re-visitation by Carlo Fontana and Gian Lorenzo Bernini, surrounded by 28 hectares of parkland.

=== Province of Viterbo ===
- Palazzo Farnese (Caprarola): Transformed from a pentagonal fortress into an elegant Mannerist palace by Vignola. Features a fine circular courtyard and spiral staircase (Scala Regia).
- Villa Lante (Bagnaia): Designed by Vignola and completed by Carlo Maderno. Features a formal Italian garden with a prospective axis decorated by fountains.
- Monsters' Grove (Bomarzo): A unique monumental complex (Sacro Bosco) created for Vicino Orsini, reflecting Roman Mannerism through larger-than-life fantastic sculptures.
- Palazzo Giustiniani (Bassano Romano): Restored by Vincenzo Giustiniani with the involvement of Carlo Maderno and Domenichino.

== Status ==
The property is on Italy's Tentative List of World Heritage Sites. The submission of the full nomination dossier for inscription on the World Heritage List is a pending action by the Italian Ministry of Culture.
