= Ville Tuscolane =

16th- and 17th-century villas complex in Lazio, Italy

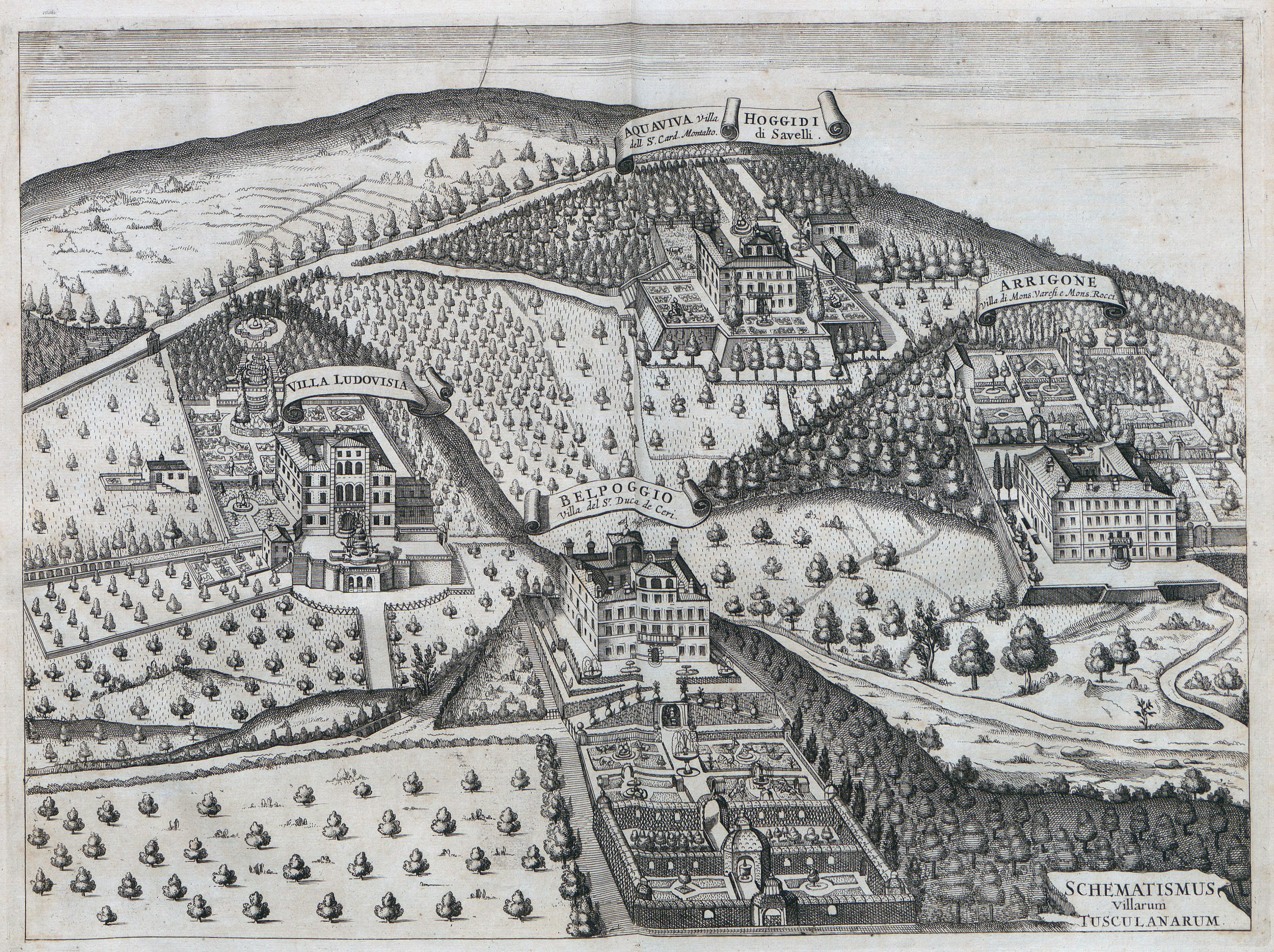
Tusculan Villas, illustration in Athanasius Kircher, Latium (1671)

The Tusculan Villas (Italian: Ville Tuscolane) are a complex of twelve villas in the Castelli Romani area near Rome. They are considered unique in their architectural and artistic value and their integration of gardens and landscape. Thus they are in the application process for UNESCO World Heritage. The villas belong to the territory of the towns of Frascati, Monte Porzio Catone and Grottaferrata.

== History ==
Already in classical antiquity, members of the Roman aristocracy built their own villas near Tusculum, at the foot of the mountain of the same name, appreciating the proximity to the Urbs of Rome and the mild, pleasant climate. From the Renaissance onwards, the area was once again affected by a flourishing of villas: in fact, the nobility of the Papal States, drawn by the same attractions, chose the area as a place of retreat.

From initial country houses surrounded by cultivated lands and woods, they became true stately palaces, resulting from the work of the most talented architects and artists of the 16th century and 17th century. They are linked to the concept of the Imperial-era Roman villa as a place of gathering and meditation, with the use of the nymphaeum as a decorative feature in the design of the 'castle' garden. The intuition that water could be a source of delight, combined with sculpture and architectural staging, proposed new stylistic attitudes and trends realized through various constructive typologies. The Classicist, Cortona-school, and Baroque schools, both in painting and in sculpture, found in the Tusculan Villas the place for their expression both inside the palace-castle and externally, in the surrounding garden.

The villas today fall within the territory of the three municipalities of Frascati, Monte Porzio Catone, and Grottaferrata, all bordering each other and located in the Metropolitan City of Rome. They have almost all reached the 21st century intact, with some exceptions: the main buildings of Villa Vecchia in Monte Porzio Catone and Villa Sciarra in Frascati were destroyed during World War II and the current ones are reconstructions. The same fate befell Villa Torlonia in Frascati, although its park survived, maintaining its original layout, and today serves as a municipal garden.

In 1992, the regional administration of Lazio founded the Istituto Regionale Ville Tuscolane (IRVIT), a public body for the promotion of the Tusculan Villas. In 2006, the ten surviving villas were officially entered on the list of Italian candidatures for the list of World Heritage Sites under the name Villas of the Papal Nobility in Lazio, along with five other properties.

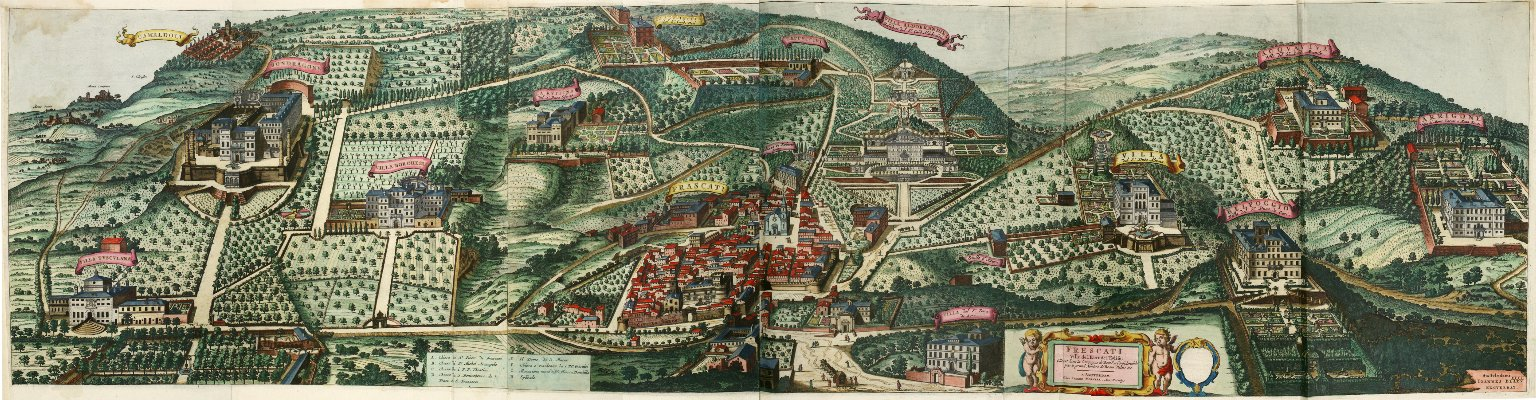
Engraving by Matteo Greuter depicting Frascati and the Tusculan Villas (1620)

== List of Villas ==
| Image | Name | Current Ownership | Municipality | Coordinates |
|---|---|---|---|---|
| | Villa Aldobrandini | Private (Aldobrandini family) | Frascati | 41.80343°N 12.6836°E |
| | Villa Falconieri | Public (State-owned, granted for use to the Accademia Vivarium Novum) | Frascati | 41.8072°N 12.68925°E |
| | Villa Lancellotti | Private (Lancellotti family) | Frascati | 41.8065°N 12.6833°E |
| | Villa Sciarra | Public (Comprehensive Institute Villa Sciarra) | Frascati | 41.8044°N 12.673°E |
| | Villa Sora | Private (Salesian College Villa Sora) | Frascati | 41.80982°N 12.67049°E |
| | Villa Torlonia | Public (Frascati municipality) | Frascati | 41.8036°N 12.67927°E |
| | Villa Tuscolana | Private (hotel) | Frascati | 41.8033°N 12.6897°E |
| | Villa Mondragone | Public (University of Rome Tor Vergata) | Monte Porzio Catone | 41.809111°N 12.696889°E |
| | Villa Parisi | Private (Parisi family) | Monte Porzio Catone | 41.81°N 12.691°E |
| | Villa Vecchia | Private (hotel) | Monte Porzio Catone | 41.813781°N 12.693483°E |
| | Villa Grazioli | Private (hotel) | Grottaferrata | 41.799753°N 12.664691°E |
| | Villa Muti | Private | Grottaferrata | 41.8017°N 12.6726°E |

== World Heritage Application ==
The villas are part of a larger serial site nomination titled Villas of the Papal Nobility (Italian: Ville della nobiltà pontificia nel Lazio), which was submitted by Italy to the UNESCO Tentative List of World Heritage Sites on June 1, 2006.

The nomination includes a total of ten Tusculan Villas (among others in the Viterbo area) and recognizes them as a unified "high level residential system" that profoundly influenced the development of the Lazio countryside and inspired living culture in other parts of Europe. The site is proposed under the following criteria and themes:

- Criteria: (i), (ii), (iii), (iv)
- Category: Cultural
- Themes: Cultural landscapes
- Reference Number: 351

Outstanding Universal Value

The UNESCO dossier highlights the Villas' significance based on several factors:

- Architectural Synthesis (Criterion i & ii): The villas represent an exceptional display of late Renaissance and Baroque styles, involving the most renowned architects (e.g., Vignola, Giacomo della Porta, Carlo Maderno, Gian Lorenzo Bernini, Francesco Borromini, Luigi Vanvitelli) and artists (e.g., Taddeo Zuccari, Domenichino, Pietro da Cortona, Giovanni Paolo Pannini).
- Unique Cultural Landscape (Criterion iii & iv): The properties served as symbols of political and dynastic status for the Roman aristocracy and high clergy connected to the Papal Court. Their main common feature is the integration of vast, formal gardens with the natural landscape, utilizing large-scale terracing and sophisticated water engineering works to create extravagant nymphaea and jeux d'eau, water features like fountains, artificial waterfalls and grottos.

Component Villas in the Nomination

The following Tusculan Villas are specifically included in the serial nomination (in the Province of Rome, Lazio):

- Frascati: Villa Falconieri, Villa Tuscolana, Villa Aldobrandini, Villa Lancellotti, Villa Sora, and Villa Torlonia.
- Monte Porzio Catone: Villa Mondragone and Villa Parisi.
- Grottaferrata: Villa Grazioli and Villa Muti.
- Note: The nomination also includes Palazzo Chigi in Ariccia, and four sites in the Province of Viterbo: Palazzo Farnese, Villa Lante, Monsters' Grove in Bomarzo, and Villa Giustiniani Odescalchi.

Comparison with Similar Sites

The "Villas of the Papal Nobility" are of comparable quality as other serial sites of Italian World Heritage, such as the Palladian Villas of Veneto and the Medici Villas and Gardens in Tuscany. However, they are distinguished by:

- Greater Variety and Time Span: They were built over a longer period and display a wider architectural range.
- Primary Function: They were primarily focused on social life and entertainment rather than agriculture.
- Relationship with Landscape: They share a particularly close and dramatic relationship with the surrounding landscape, integrating the environment as a deliberate backdrop.

== Bibliography ==
- F. Grossi Gondi, Le Ville Tuscolane, 1901
