= Villa Vecchia =

Villa in Frascati, Italy

Coordinates: 41°48′50″N 12°41′37″E

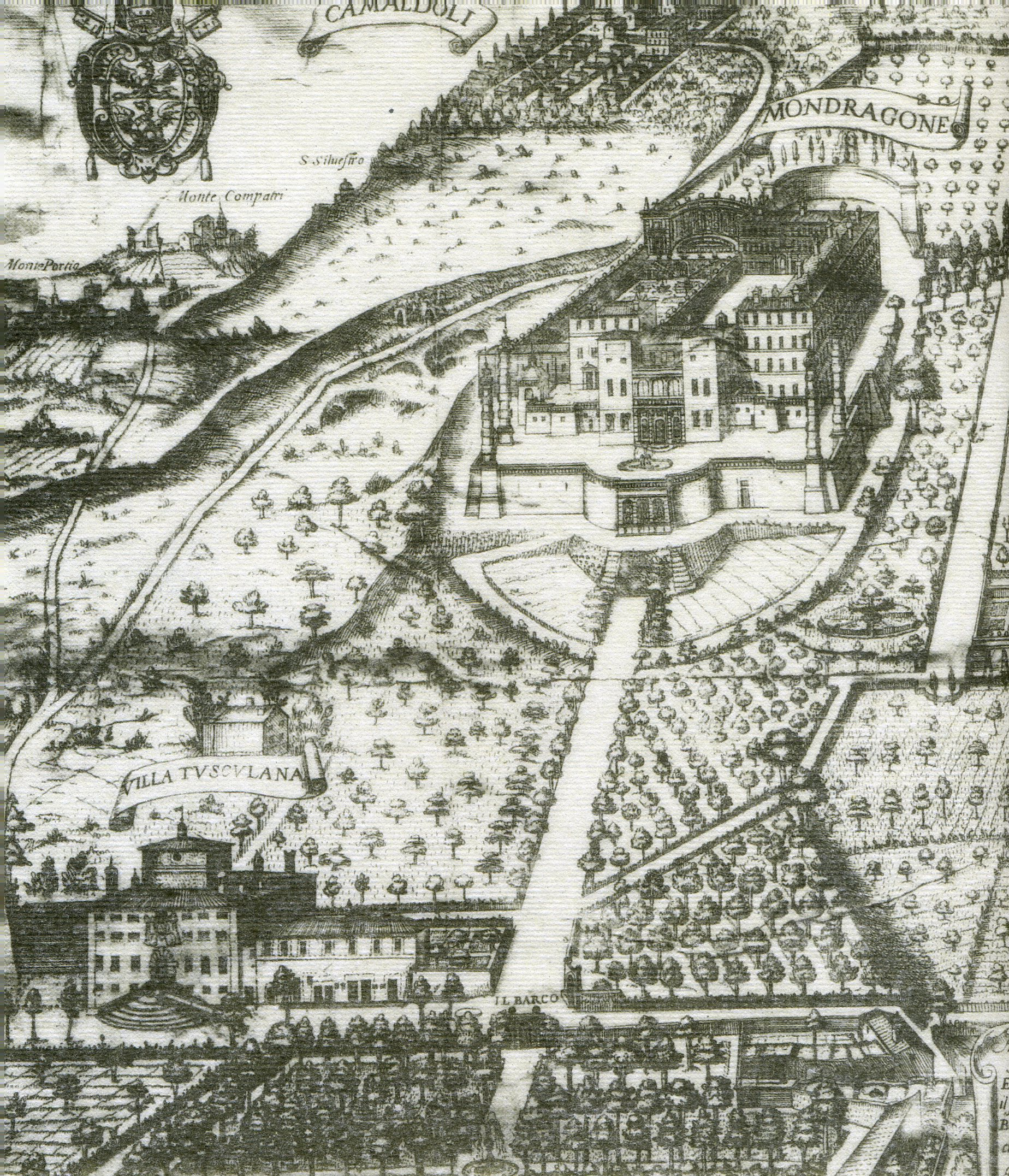
Villa Vecchia - print of 1620 - Matteo Greuter

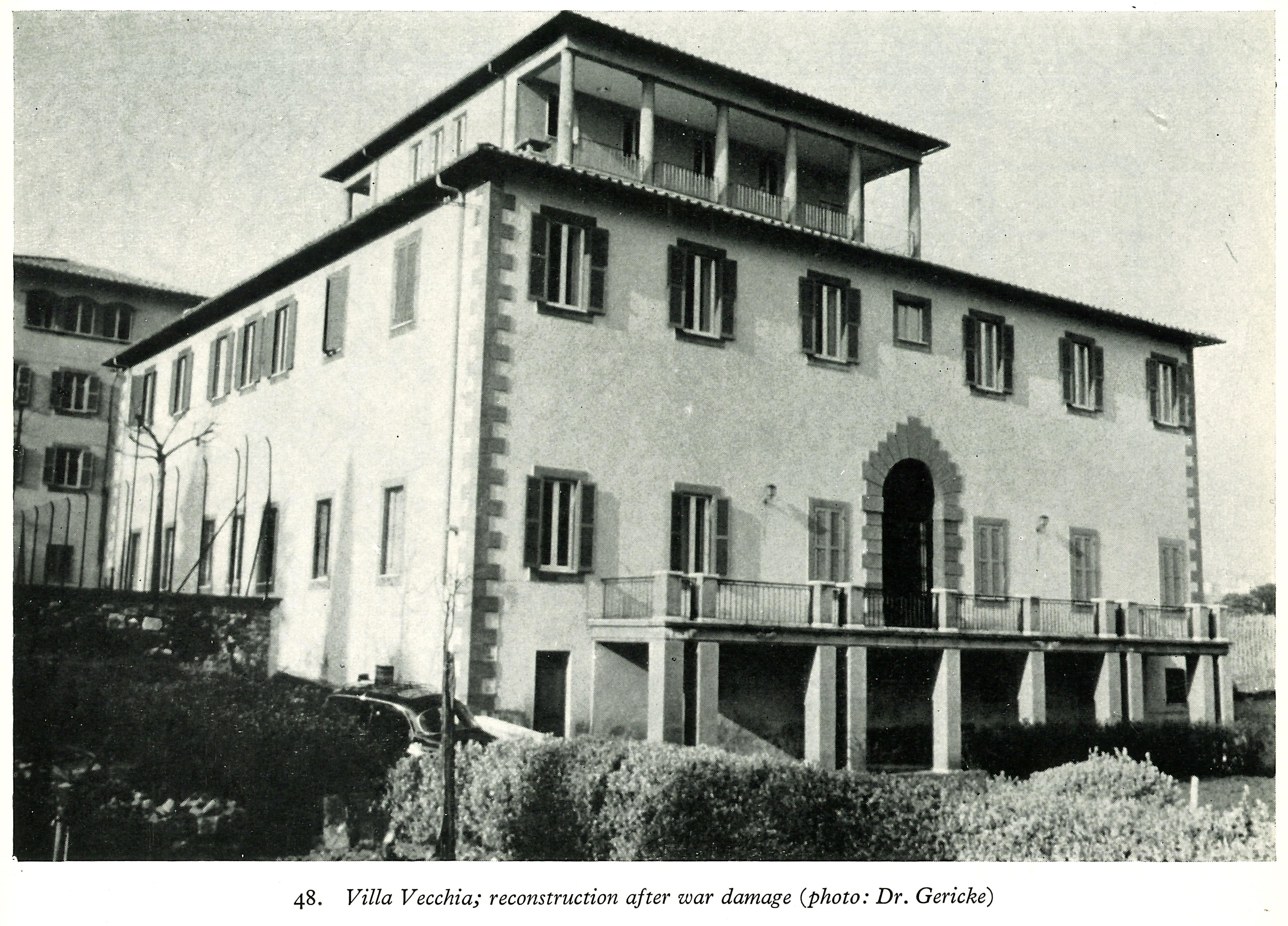
The rebuilt Villa Vecchia in 1960.

Villa Vecchia is a patrician villa near Frascati, Italy, in the territory of the commune of Monte Porzio Catone. In the villa's garden there is a long stretch of a well kept Roman road. It was founded in 1560 by the cardinal Giovanni Ricci of Montepulciano. Frascati is known for 12 such villas, the Ville Tuscolane.

In 1562 the villa sold to the Cardinal Ranuccio Farnese, it was the first residence in Frascati by the Farnese family, with the name Villa Tusculana, and was restored by Vignola for the occasion. Pope Gregory XIII sometimes used it as summer residence.

The villa was damaged by air attacks in the Second World War (1943–1944) because it was used as German military depot.

The villa now houses a hotel and restaurant.
