= Odescalchi Castle =

Odescalchi Castle may refer to:

- Orsini-Odescalchi Castle, in Bracciano, Italy
- Odescalchi Castle, Ilok, Croatia

== See also ==
- Villa Giustiniani Odescalchi
