= Mario Titi =

Italian painter (1921–1982)

- Born: Mario Titi; 1921; Frascati
- Died: 1982 (aged 60–61); Frascati
- Known for: Painting
- Movement: Futurism

Mario Titi (1921–1982) was a painter of the Roman and Castelli Romani artistic scene of the 20th century; his works are shown in churches and museums of the Lazio, and all over the world. The artist frequented from a young age the academy of Belle Arti of Rome, sticking to the futurist movement. He was a follower of Tato (Guglielmo Sansoni) and then of Pippo Rizzo. In the Vernissage of Rome, Naples and Frascati he exposed for the first time works with a new technique, the "Drip painting" exploited by Jackson Pollock, soon becoming the Italian leader of the style.

He continued with the Vernissage in Paris, New York, Munich, Milan, Madrid and other cities of the world. In the 1970s he produced 120 "castings" inspired by the epic poem The Divine Comedy.

== See also ==
- Futurism

== Photo gallery ==
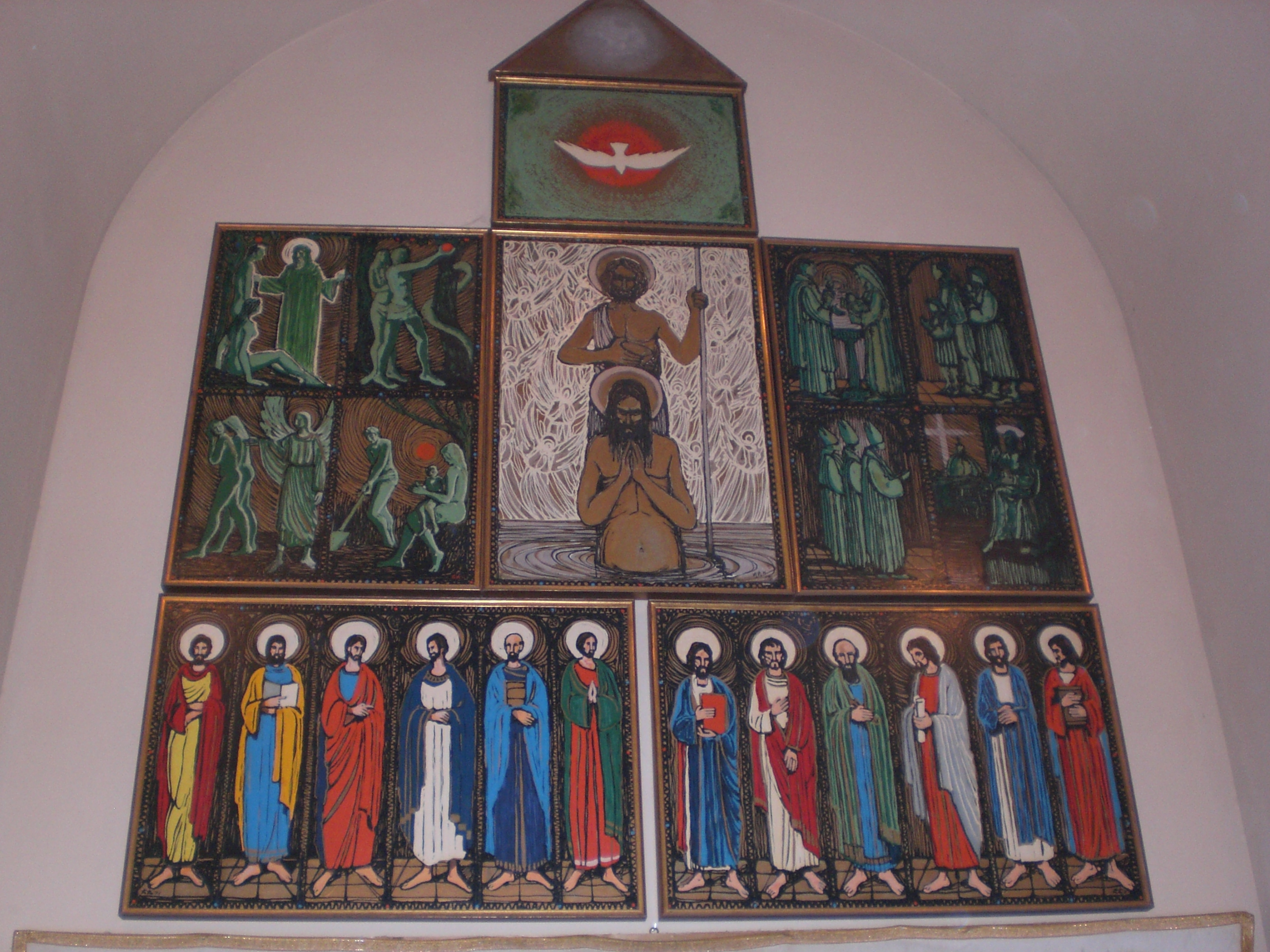
Altar-piece of Mario Titi in Capocroce Church Frascati
