= Lancellotti =

Lancellotti is an Italian surname. Notable people with the surname include:

- Francesca Lancellotti (1917–2008), Italian layperson declared venerable
- Giovan Paolo Lancellotti (1522–1590), Italian jurist
- Rick Lancellotti (born 1956), American baseball player

== See also ==
- Villa Lancellotti, a villa in Frascati, Italy
