= Villa Sciarra =

Villa in Frascati, Italy

Coordinates: 41°48′16″N 12°40′23″E

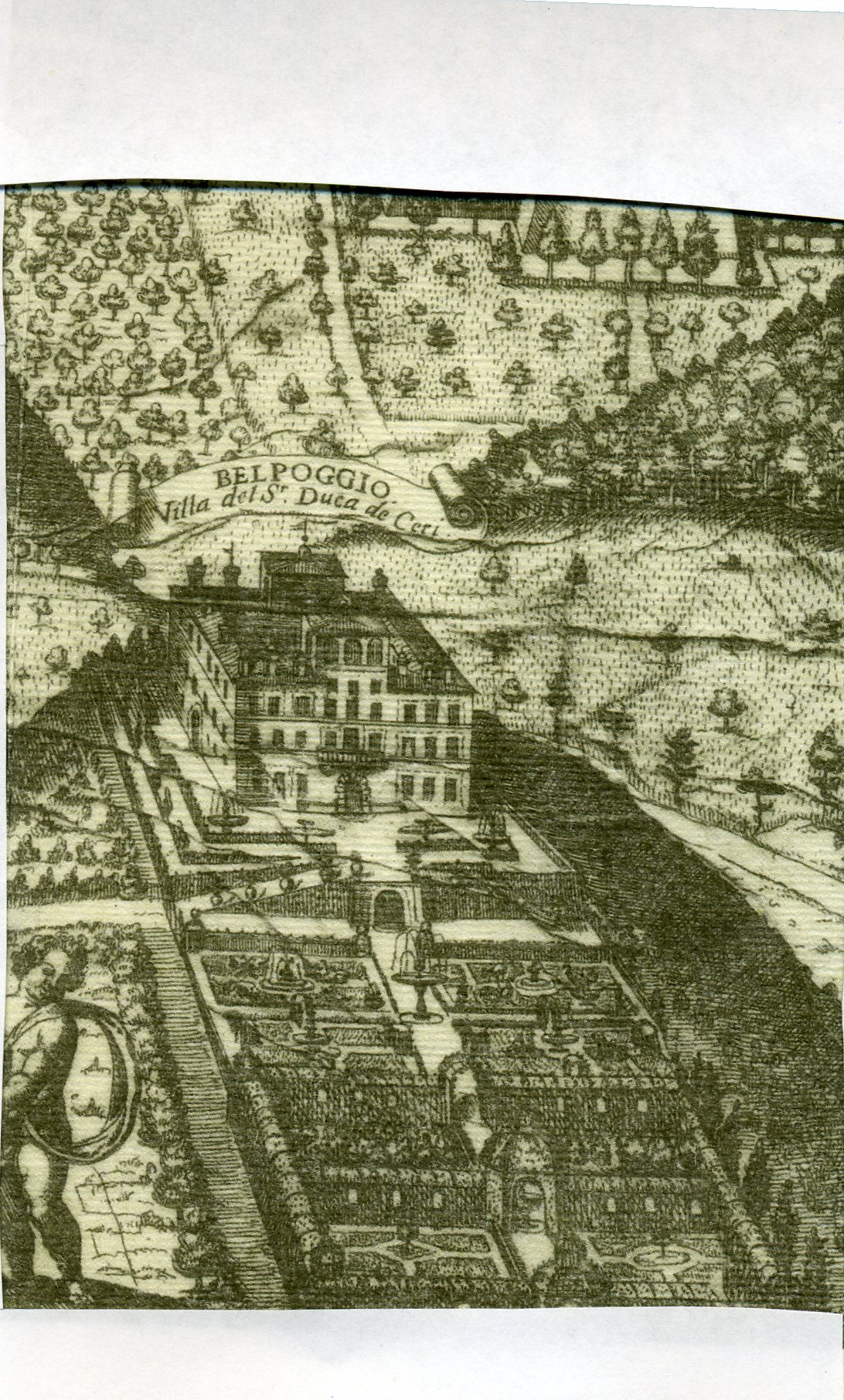
Print of Matteo Greuter 1620 - Villa Sciarra

The Villa Sciarra is a villa in Frascati, Italy.

Also called Villa Bel Poggio, the Villa Sciarra was built in 1570 at the orders of Ottaviano Vestri.

The portal gate of the gardens is to ascribe to Nicola Salvi. The main edifice of the villa was destroyed when Frascati was bombed by Americans on September 8, 1943.

The gardens are now a public park.
