= Clara Louisa Wells =

American writer and inventor

- Born: 29 October 1838; Hallowell, Maine
- Died: 28 December 1925 (aged 87); Murcia - Spain
- Other names: Miss C. L. Wells
- Education: Degree in Science
- Employer(s): Writer and Inventor

Clara Louisa Wells (also known as Miss C. L. Wells; 29 October 1838 – 28 December 1925) was an American writer and inventor.

== Biography ==
She was born in Maine, studied in Boston and took a degree in science. She had very good knowledge of Latin, Greek, Italian and French. She started work with her first publication, "Alban Hills - Vol. I - Frascati". Throughout her life she continued to write in Europe - (France) and America.

Near the end of her life she wrote a series of peace pamphlets on the League of Nations and European politic.

One copy of each of her French works is kept in the public library "Médiathèque Publique et Universitaire" de Valence (Drome) - France.

== Publications ==
- Wells, Clara Louisa (1878). The Alban Hills, Vol. I: Frascati. Rome, Italy: Barbera. OCLC 21996251.
- Wells, Clara Louisa (1883). The Amphitheatres of Ancient Rome. Boston, USA: Cupples. OCLC 916916.
- Wells, Clara Louisa (1887). Progetto per ottenere acqua potabile da tutti i mari. Pompeii, Italy. Pompeii, Italy.
- Wells, Clara Louisa (1905). Arrondissement de Privas in the Department of Ardeche, France. Annonay, France: Becombe & Bon.
- 1906 Arrondissement of Valence in the Department of the Drome - France - ed. L'imprimerie valentinoise - Valence - Drome - Pos. A 525 Archives départementales de Valence - France
- 1915 A League between Nation - ed. L'imprimerie valentinoise - Valence (Drome) France - Series:Pamphlets on peace. No. 89 - LC Classification: JX1937.P3 n. 89.
- Wells, Clara Louisa (1917). The Arrondissement of Grasse in the Department of the Alpes Maritimes, France. Grasse, France: Valence (Drome) L'Imprimerie valentinoise. OCLC 35523685.

== Inventions ==
- 1897-05-29 Improvements in Aerial Routes, and connected with the Distillation, Storage, and Supply of Water. List of UK Intellectual Property Office - Publication info:GB189613715 (1)
- 1897-10-16 Center providing Means for Controlling and Utilizing Volcanic, Aqueous, and Meteorological Forces. List of UK Intellectual Property Office - Publication info:GB189712836 (1)
- 1899-05-13 Secure Modes of Exploring the Cold and Hot Regions of the Earth by Means of Centers of Elevation and Depression, with Reference to Volcanic, Aqueous, and Meteorological Forces, and of Routes Suspended with or without Ballons. List of UK Intellectual Property Office - Publication info: GB189815679 (1)
- 1909-10-22 Improvements in, and relating to, the Propulsion, by Balloons, of Ships and other Vessels Navigable in Water. List of UK Intellectual Property Office- Publication info:GB190822417 (1)
