= Villa Giustiniani Odescalchi =

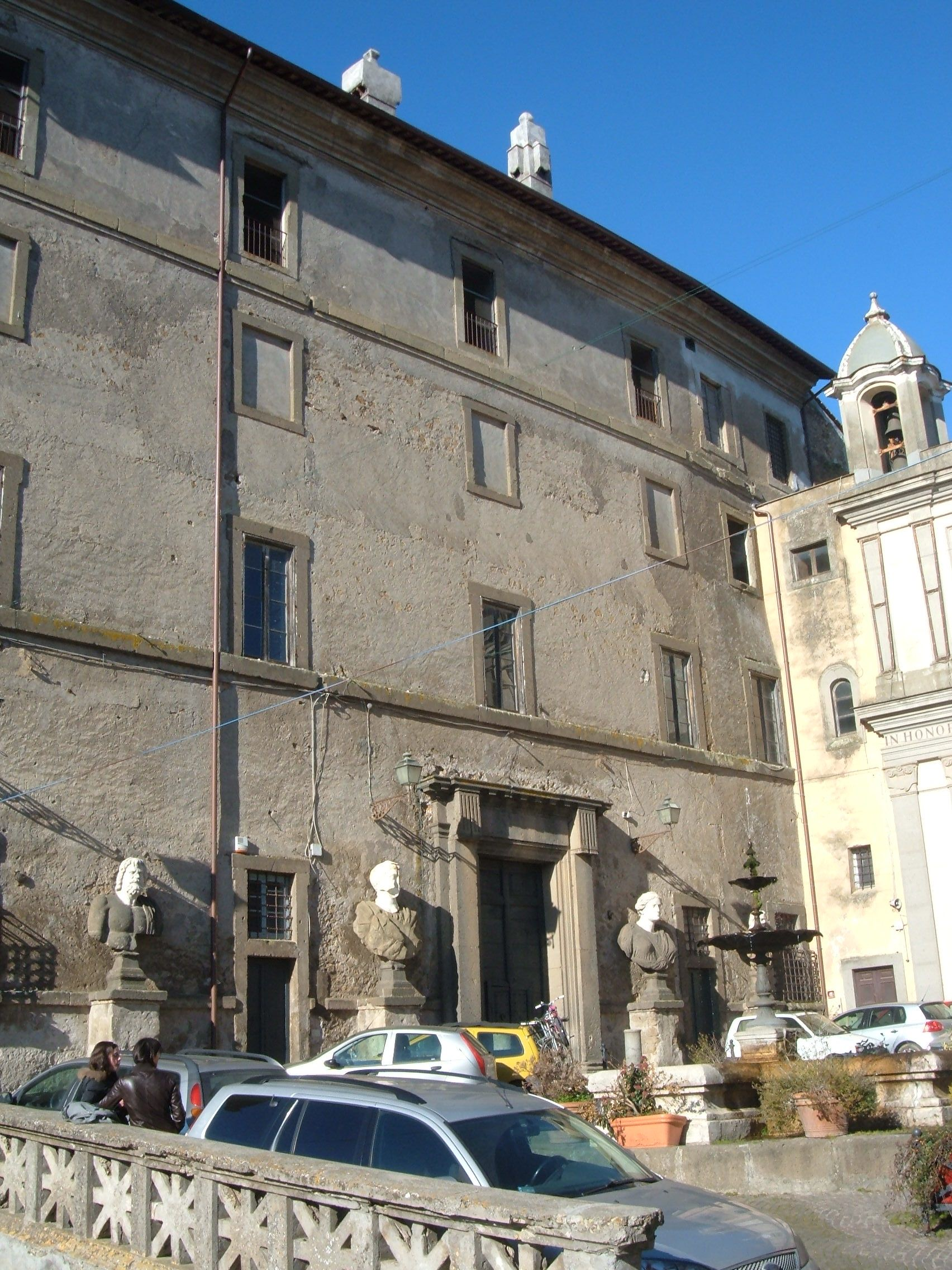
- Facade of the palace
- Interactive map of the Villa Giustiniani Odescalchi area

General information
- Status: Under restoration, partially open
- Location: Bassano Romano, Italy
- Owner: MiBAC

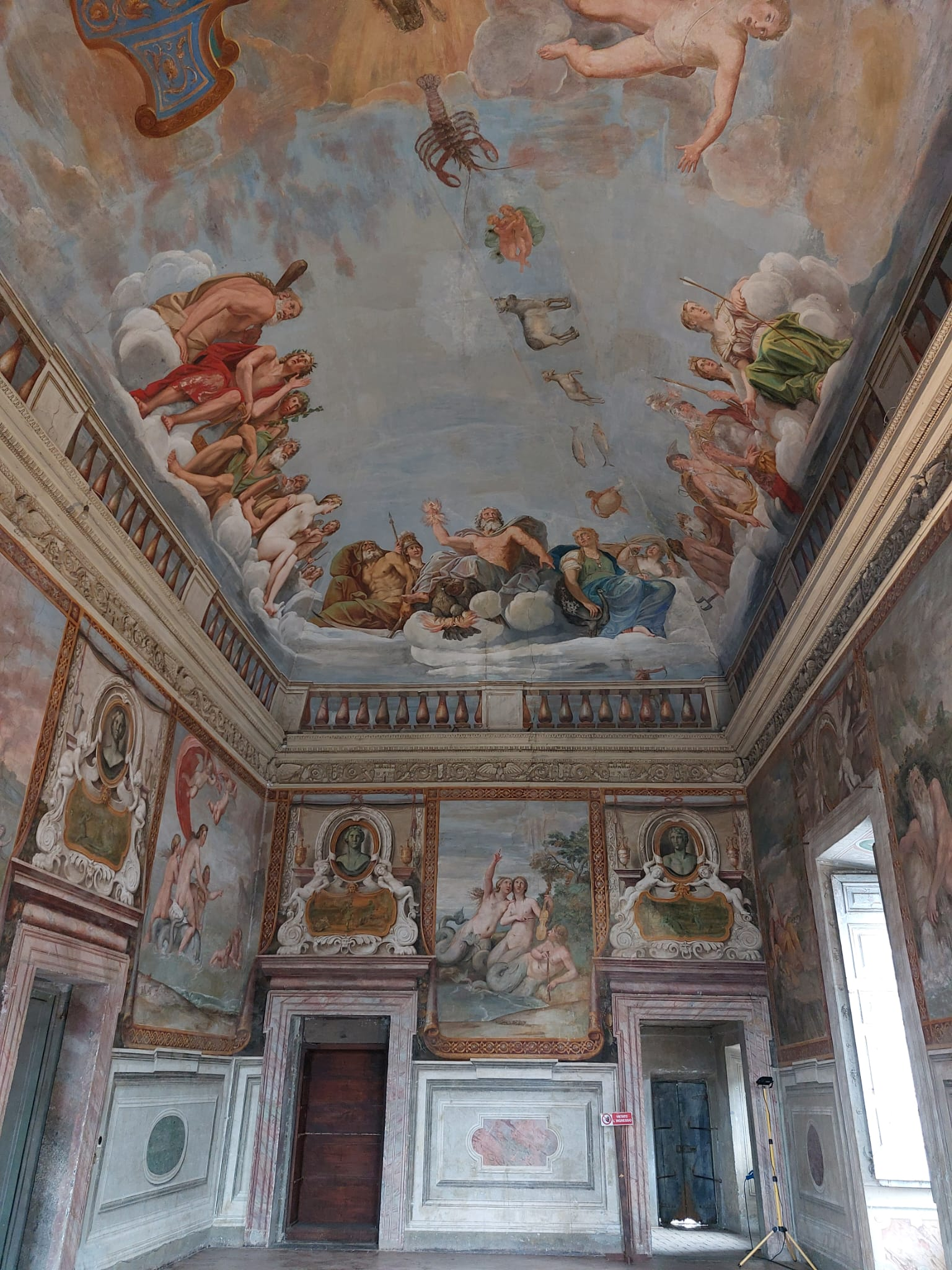
The gallery frescoed by Francesco Albani

The Palazzo Giustiniani Odescalchi, also known as Villa Giustiniani Odescalchi, is located in Bassano Romano, a municipality in the Province of Viterbo.

It is artistically relevant and since 2006 part of the application for UNESCO World Heritage titled Villas of the Papal Nobility. Numerous artists worked inside the palazzo, including Antonio Tempesta, Bernardo Castello, Marcantonio Piemontese, Antonio Gaio, Domenico Zampieri (known as Domenichino), Paolo Guidotti (known as Cavalier Borghese), and Francesco Albani.

Since December 2014, the Ministry of Cultural Heritage and Activities has managed the site through the Museum Pole of Lazio, which became the Regional Directorate of Museums in December 2019.

== History ==
Formerly owned by the Anguillara family, the palace underwent its first transformation in the 16th century. However, the most massive works were carried out during the 17th century, commissioned by Marquis Vincenzo Giustiniani. The Giustiniani family moved here after about 300 years of residence on the island of Chios (Scio), a Genoese merchant base in the Aegean, seeking a quiet place following the Turkish invasion.

The Marquis was responsible for a grandiose building program here, which involved not only the palace but also the vast park behind it, connected to the piano nobile (main floor) of the building via a viaduct with a drawbridge. The architecture and designs were by Giacomo Barozzi da Vignola. From the palace loggia, one can admire a good part of the garden and the long perspective avenue leading to the Rocca, a crenellated and turreted hunting lodge that reproduces the heraldic fortress of the Giustiniani family. A subsequent phase of work occurred towards the end of the 17th century, during which the small theater was built.

In 1854, due to significant financial difficulties, the Giustiniani family ceded the palace to Livio Odescalchi. After the mid-20th century, the Odescalchi family began to lose interest in the palace and the park, which fell into a state of desolate abandonment.

The palace, with the annexed park and hunting lodge, was purchased by the Italian State in 2003. Slow restoration works began (initially mostly emergency interventions) overseen by the Superintendency for Architectural Heritage of Lazio, aimed at remedying decades of neglect (especially evident in the park and the Casina). However, in 2012, the degradation affecting the villa was highlighted by the disappearance of the head of the Bearded Divinity located on the main facade, which was stolen and never recovered.

Following the restoration of the roofs, the main building of the villa—containing the principal fresco decorations—was reopened to the public on May 24, 2016; it is currently visitable every Saturday morning with a free guided tour. In 2016, it recorded 1,049 visitors.

== Description ==
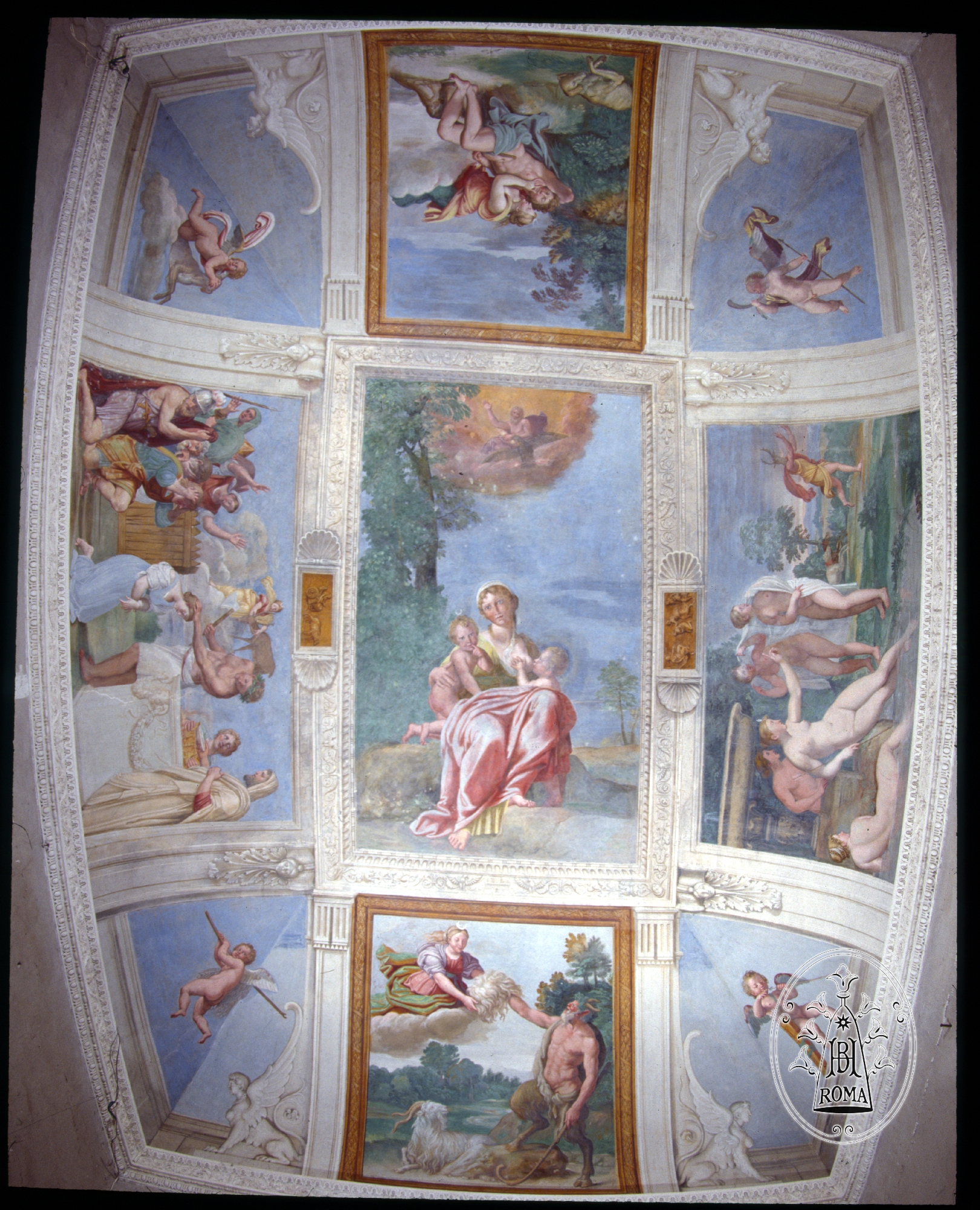
Frescoes by Domenichino in the Villa Giustiniani Odescalchi

The main entrance is located on the square which also faces the parish church. It consists of a massive wooden door, flanked by four peperino stone busts supporting four marble heads dating back to the Roman era (2nd century AD). The walls of the internal courtyard were frescoed with fantastic scenes of triumphs created by Antonio Tempesta; also in the courtyard, a statue overlooking a small fountain can be seen. Access to the piano nobile is gained via a loggia frescoed with grotesques around 1570–1580. Inside, there are numerous rooms, all splendidly frescoed with various motifs: the coat of arms of the House of Giustiniani; the fable of Cupid and Psyche; the Four Seasons; Mount Parnassus consecrated to Apollo and home of the Muses; the port of Genoa (city of origin of the Giustiniani) and the port of Chios (the island where they established flourishing mercantile trades); biblical episodes related to the figure of Moses; a domed vault (painted to visually expand the space of a pavilion vault); an allegory of the victory of the soul over sin; the Stories of Diana by Domenichino; the Fall of Phaeton by Francesco Albani; and numerous other frescoes and decorations.

The heritage contained in this palace, consisting of pieces of armor, busts, statues, furnishings, and all kinds of objects typical of a long-inhabited palace, was transferred and concentrated in the Palazzo Odescalchi in nearby Bracciano by the Odescalchi family themselves.

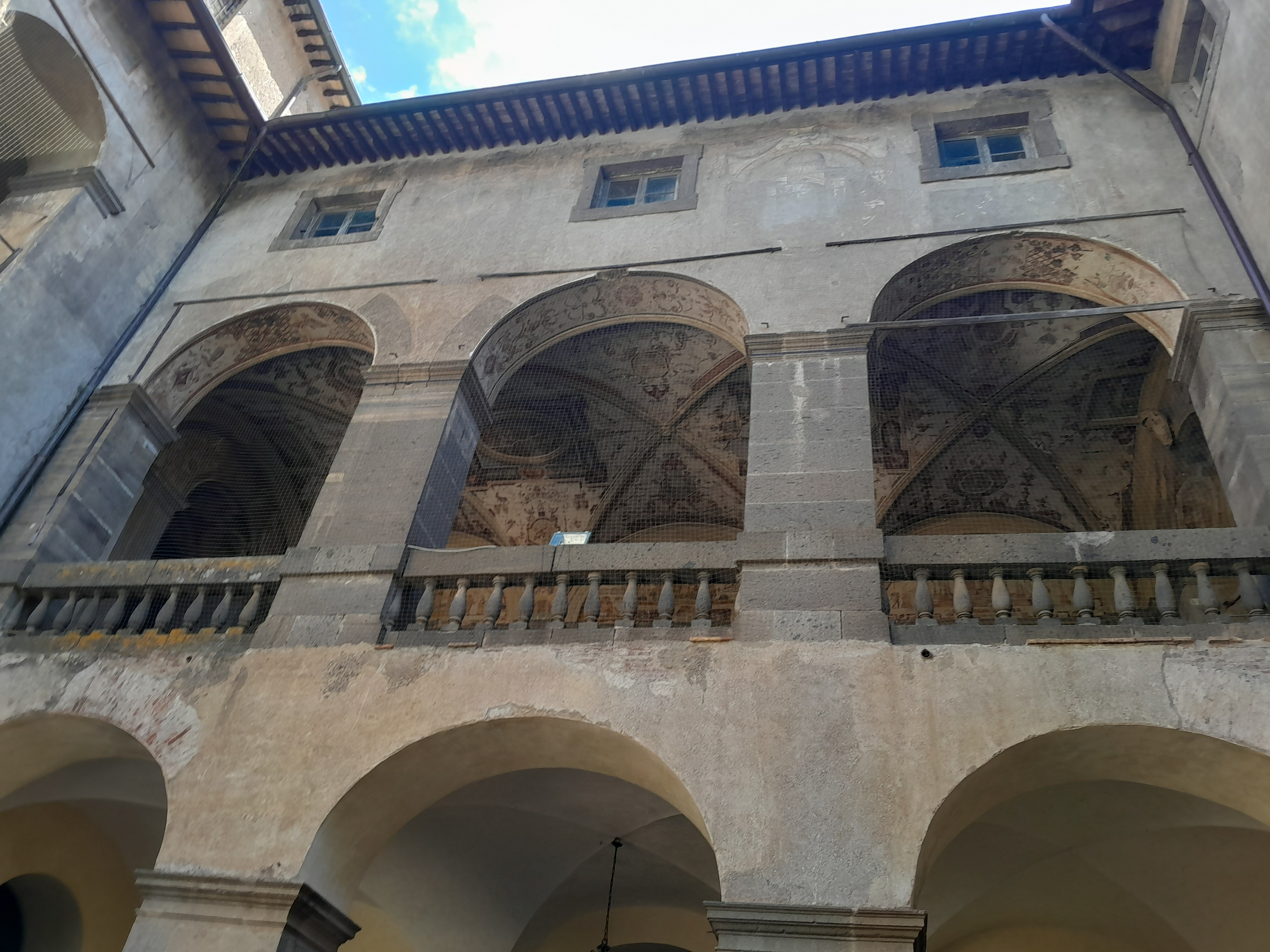
Palazzo Giustiniani, frescoed with grotesque vaults

Noteworthy is a small theater, located on the ground floor and conceived in the English style: Vincenzo Giustiniani had in fact visited the summer residence of Henry VII of England in Surrey. Inside, wooden boxes can be seen, formerly upholstered with drapes and used to host the noble audience, and a large stalls area accessed via the courtyard, reserved for the common people.

== Park ==
The park occupies the most substantial part of the property. Its creation dates back to the early 1600s, the work of Vincenzo Giustiniani, who had been very impressed by the parks present in French and English palaces. Currently undergoing restoration, the park consisted of numerous decorative solutions: avenues, some covered, each lined with hedges and shrubs of every species, and small squares equipped with sculptural groups and stone furnishings, all respecting Renaissance canons in the synthesis between nature and art.

Access to this splendid park is via a bridge connecting it to Palazzo Giustiniani-Odescalchi. At the end of the bridge, there are two elegant flights of stairs enclosing a nymphaeum, formerly surrounded by statues of every kind. This is followed by an Italian garden, the conditions of which are currently in a state of total degradation; from the palace, one could once see the hunting lodge through a very long avenue, still existing but covered by dense vegetation.

The park still possesses a splendid arboreal heritage: holm oaks, firs, cypresses, spruces, chestnuts, and fruit trees such as cherries, peaches, pears, and many other types of plantation, testifying to its conception as a productive garden.

=== Hunting lodge (casina di caccia) ===
Within the park adjacent to the palace is a hunting lodge, arranged over three levels and rich in decorations. Called "La Rocca" by local inhabitants due to its previously deteriorated appearance, it retains a particular charm. Architecturally, it follows the style of the palace but is equipped with a crenellated altana (roof terrace) and a central tower, previously surrounded by four others, which were later destroyed by the Odescalchi family due to rivalry. This building originally replicated almost perfectly the fortress depicted in the Giustiniani coat of arms surmounted by an eagle. Inside, there are decorations and stuccoes of various types; noteworthy frescoes are absent.

== In popular culture ==
Primarily by virtue of its splendid interiors, the villa has been the set for numerous documentaries, commercials, and films. Among the latter are La Dolce Vita by Federico Fellini, Blaise Pascal by Roberto Rossellini, The Leopard by Luchino Visconti, and L'avaro by Tonino Cervi, starring Alberto Sordi.

== See also ==
- Bassano Romano
- Vincenzo Giustiniani
- Giustiniani family

== Bibliography ==
- Brugnoli, Maria Vittoria. "I primi affreschi nel palazzo di Bassano di Sutri" (PDF). Bollettino d'Arte. IV Serie (III–IV). Rome: Ministero dei beni e delle attività culturali e del turismo: 241–254.
- Agostino Bureca (2003). La villa di Vincenzo Giustiniani a Bassano Romano. Rome: Gangemi. ISBN 978-88-492-0517-6.
- Agostino Bureca (2009). Bassano Romano: la villa Giustiniani Odescalchi. Rome: Ministero per i Beni e le Attività Culturali, Soprintendenza per i beni Architettonici e Paesaggistici per le province di Roma, Rieti e Viterbo.
