= Villa Parisi =

Villa in Monte Porzio Catone, Italy

Coordinates: 41°48′36″N 12°41′28″E

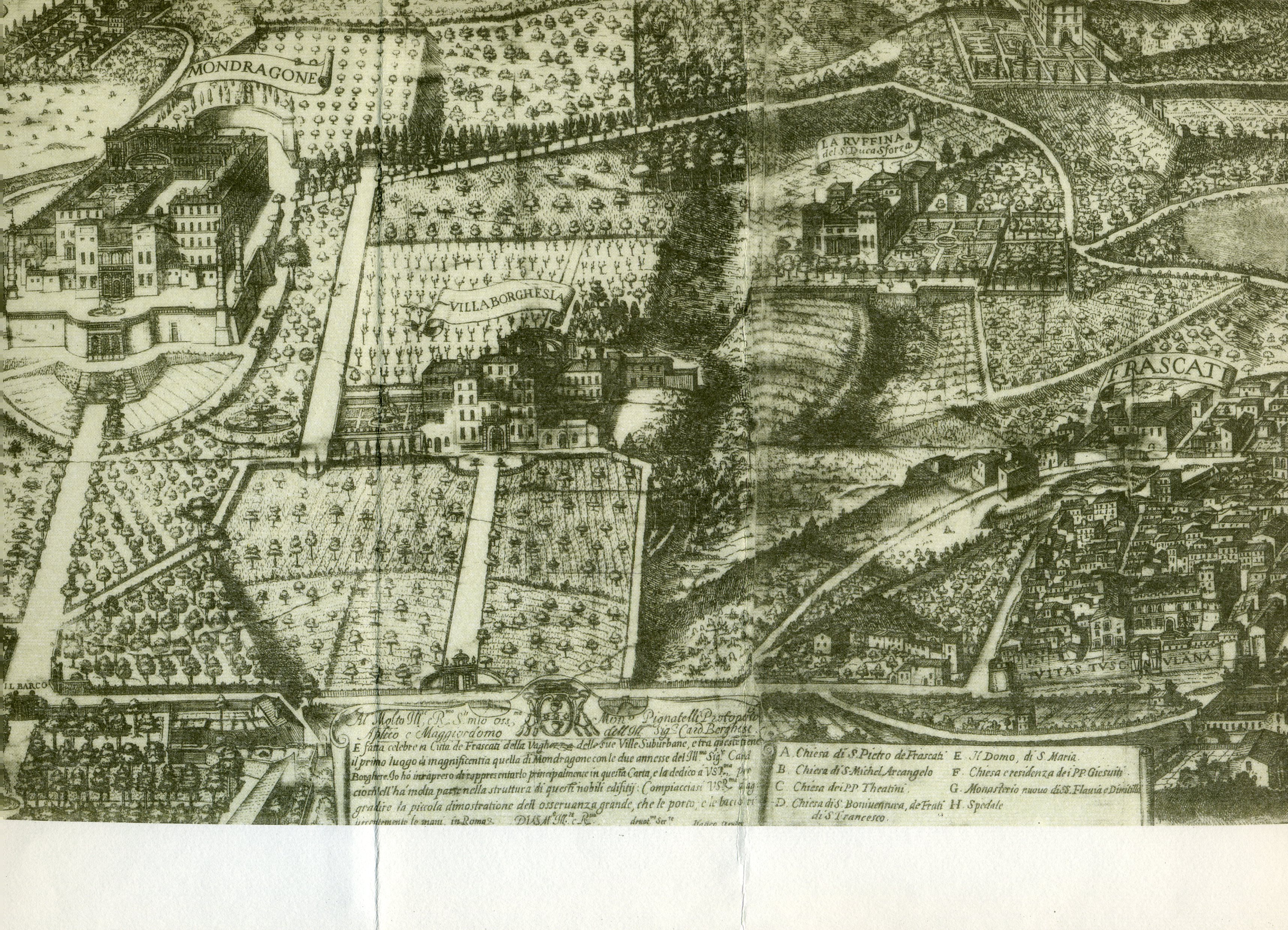
Old print of Villa Parisi-Borghese 1620 author Matteo Greuter

Villa Parisi - Borghese is a villa in Frascati, now in Monte Porzio Catone municipal territory, Italy.

== Description and history ==
Villa Parisi was built between 1604 and 1605 by Monsignor Fernando Taverna. In 1615, it was acquired by Cardinal Scipione Borghese. Later, a nymphaeum and stately portal were built together as part of the extension work by the architect Girolamo Rainaldi. In 1729, Camillo Borghese initiated further renovations.

Painted decorations were carried out in the 18th century by painters Giuseppe Valeriani and his brother Domenico, Ignazio Heldman and Taddeo Kuntze. In 1896, the villa was purchased by Savero Parisi, an entrepreneur. In the garden, are the remains of an old Roman villa. It was the summer residence of Princess Pauline Bonaparte, wife of Camillo Borghese, and his family.

The villa is not open to the public. Often used as a movie location, it was the setting for the manor in Nightmare Castle (1965) and as the primary location for the 1974 film Blood for Dracula starring Udo Kier. It was also used for some of the scenes in the REDValentino campaign for 2016-2017, featuring the singer Birdy. It was used as the primary setting for the Italian zombie movie, Burial Ground: Nights of Terror (1981), the Italian horror film Patric still lives (1980), the Netflix romantic comedy, Love Wedding Repeat (2020) and the location for Immaculate (2024), featuring Sydney Sweeney.

== Sources ==
- Wells Clara Louisa - The Alban Hills, Vol. I: Frascati - 1878 publisher: Barbera, Rome, Italy - OCLC 21996251
- Villa Parisi: Legacy of Terror (2016), https://www.imdb.com/title/tt6222296/
