= Frascati =

- Comune
- Città di Frascati
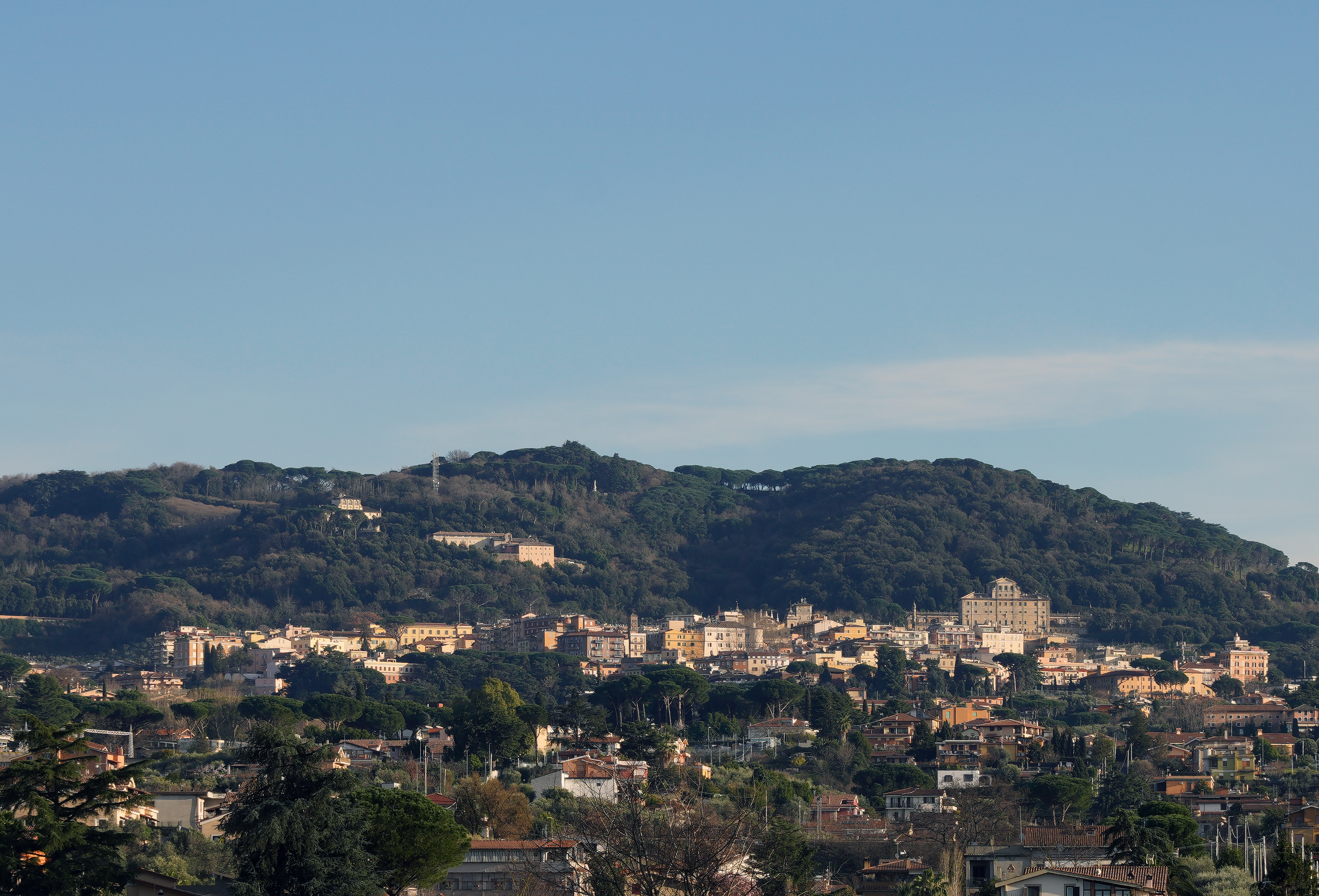
- Frascati

- Coat of arms

- Location within Italy Location within Lazio
- Coordinates: 41°49′N 12°41′E
- Country: Italy
- Region: Lazio
- Metropolitan city: Rome Capital (RM)
- Frazioni: Cisternole, Cocciano, Pantano Secco, Prataporci, Selvotta, Vermicino

Government
  - Mayor: Francesca Sbardella (PD)

Area
  - Total: 22.48 km^{2} (8.68 sq mi)
- Elevation: 320 m (1,050 ft)

Population (30 November 2021)
  - Total: 22,680
  - Density: 1,009/km^{2} (2,613/sq mi)
- Demonym: Frascatani
- Time zone: UTC+1 (CET)
  - Summer (DST): UTC+2 (CEST)
- Postal code: 00044
- Dialing code: 06
- Patron saint: Saints Apostles Philip and James
- Saint day: May 3
- Website: comune.frascati.rm.it

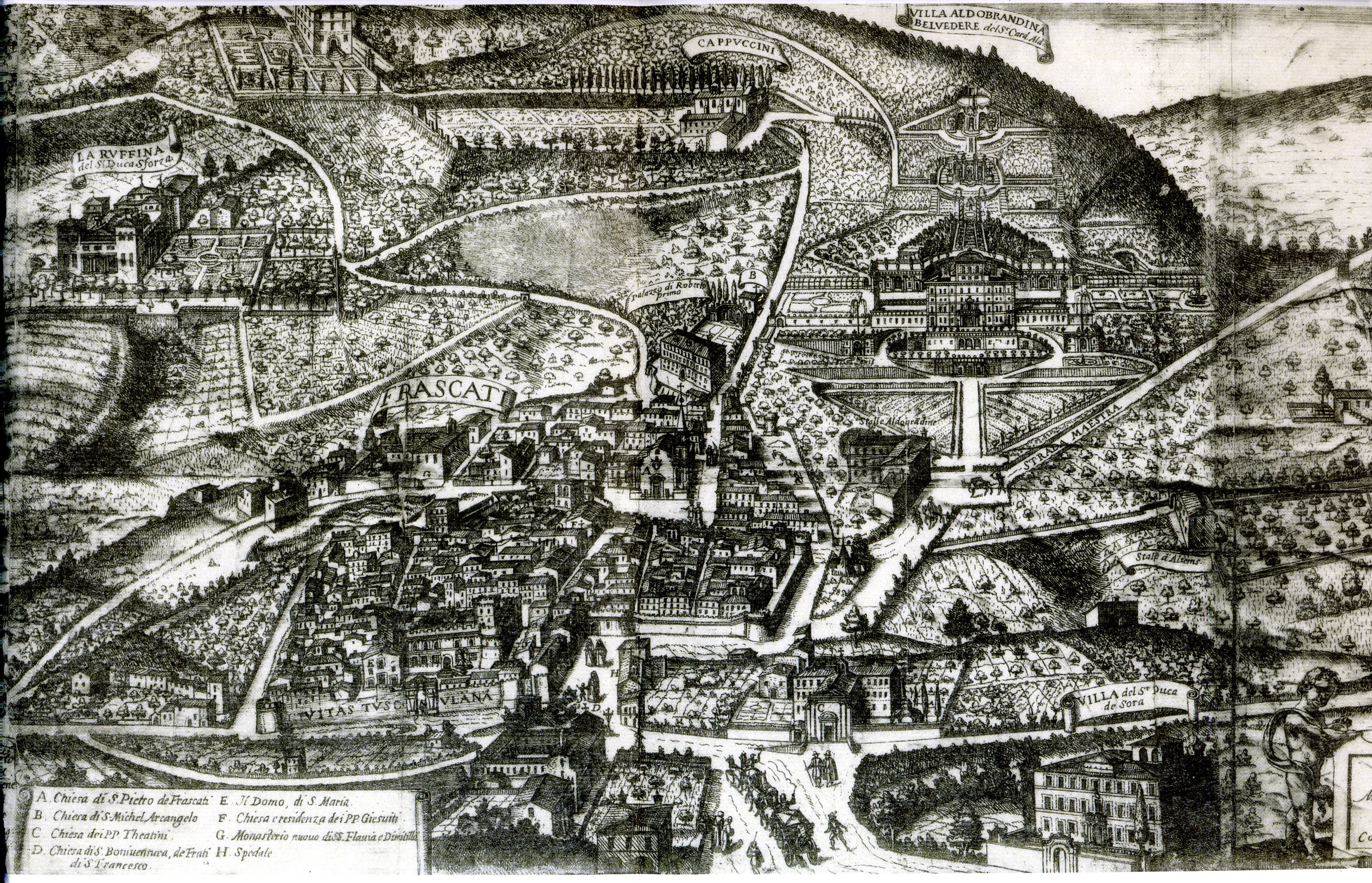
Print of Matteo Greuter (1620).

Frascati (pronounced [fraˈskaːti]) is a city and comune in the Metropolitan City of Rome Capital in the Lazio region of central Italy. It is located 20 kilometres (12 mi) south-east of Rome, on the Alban Hills close to the ancient city of Tusculum. Frascati is closely associated with science, being the location of several international scientific laboratories.

Frascati produces the white wine with the same name. It is also a historical and artistic centre.

== History ==
The most important archeological finding in the area, dating back to Ancient Roman times, during the late Republican Age, is a patrician Roman villa probably belonging to Lucullus. In the first century AD its owner was Gaius Sallustius Crispus Passienus, who married Agrippina the Younger, mother of Nero. His properties were later confiscated by the Flavian imperial dynasty (69–96 AD). Consul Flavius Clemens lived in the villa with his wife Domitilla during the rule of Domitian.

According to the Liber Pontificalis, in the 9th century Frascati was a little village, probably founded two centuries earlier. The name of the city probably comes from a typical local tradition of collecting firewood ("frasche" in Italian)—many place-names around the town refer to trees or wood. After the destruction of nearby Tusculum in 1191, the town's population increased and the bishopric moved from Tusculum to Frascati. Pope Innocent III endorsed the city as a feudal possession of the basilica of San Giovanni in Laterano, but in the following centuries its territories were ravaged by frequent raids that impoverished it. It was owned by various baronial families, including the Colonna, until, in 1460, Pope Pius II fortified the city with walls.

At the beginning of the sixteenth century, Pope Julius II gave Frascati as a feudal possession to the condottiero Marcantonio I Colonna, who lived there from 1508 together with his wife Lucrezia della Rovere (1485–1552), niece of Pope Julius II. In 1515 Colonna gave Frascati its first statute, Statuti e Capituli del Castello di Frascati, under the Latin title Populus antiquae civitas Tusculi.

In 1518 a hospital was built, named after St. Sebastiano, in memory of the old basilica destroyed in the 9th century. After Prince Colonna's death in 1522, Lucrezia della Rovere sold Frascati to Pier Luigi Farnese, nephew of Pope Paul III.

On May 1, 1527, a Landsknecht company, after having sacked Rome, arrived out of the bordering villages. However, the soldiers changed the direction of their movement next to a niche, a "Rural Aedicule" consecrated to the Virgin Mary, and the town was therefore saved. This event is commemorated by a church now called Capocroce.

In 1538, Pope Paul III conferred the title of "Civitas" to Frascati, with the name "Tusculum Novum". In 1598 construction began on a new cathedral dedicated to St. Peter.

On September 15, 1616, the first public and free school in Europe was established on the initiative of Saint Joseph Calasanz.

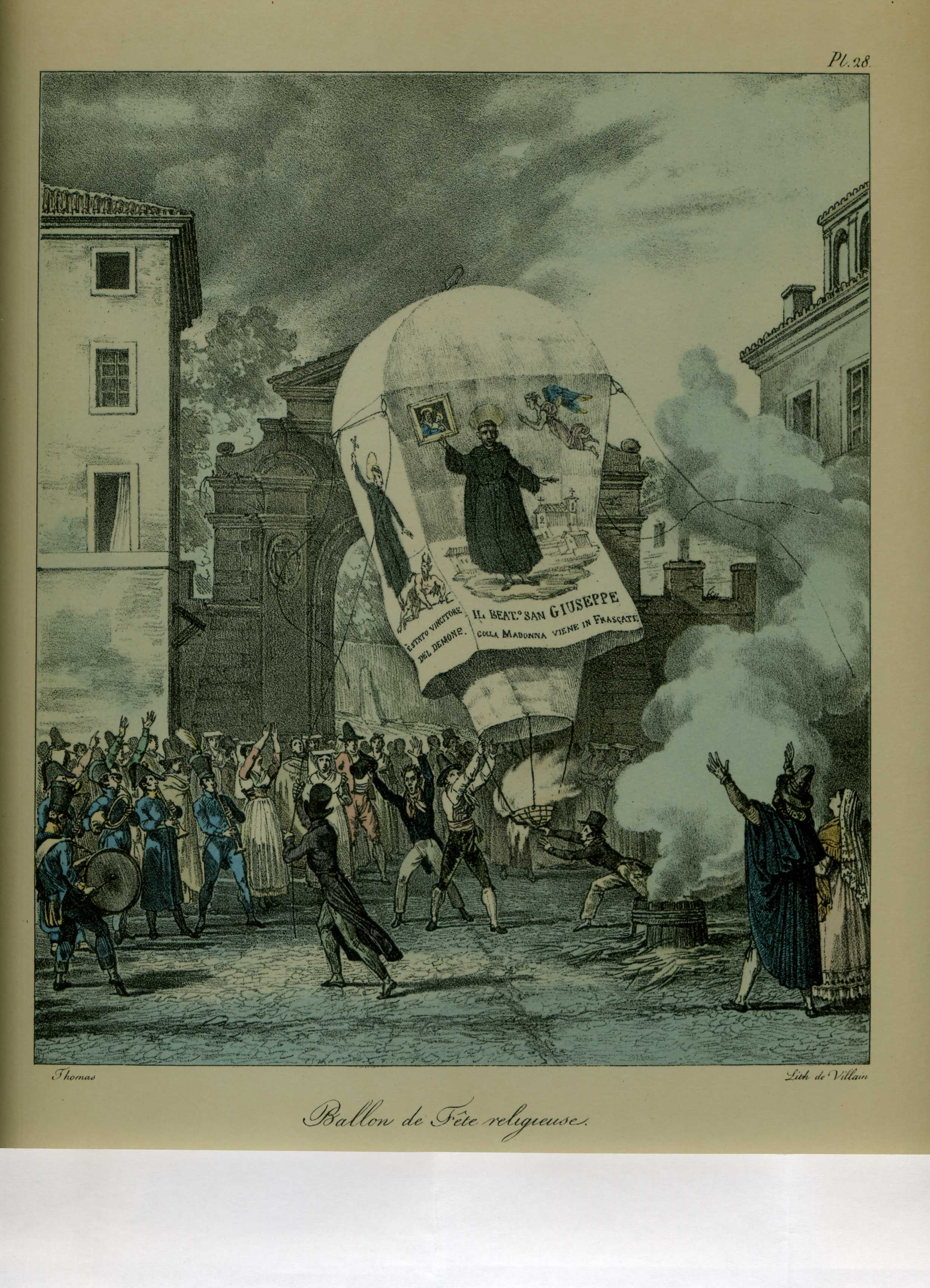
Religious holiday in Frascati: arrival of St Joseph Calasanz and the image of Our Lady (1823).

On June 18, 1656, a part of the plaster peeled off a wall inside the Church of St. Mary in Vivario, and an ancient fresco became visible. It was the image of Saints Sebastian and Roch, protector from the plague. In that same year there was an epidemic of plague in Rome but Frascati was unaffected. Since that year, the two Saints have been co-patron Saints of the city. There are statues of the two saints in the façade of the Cathedral.

Between 1713 and 1729, the head from a colossus of Antinous was discovered in the area, and displayed in the Villa Mondragone. In 1757 the Valle theater opened in the centre of the town, and in 1761 the fortress changed to a princely palace under the patronage of Cardinal Henry Stuart, Duke of York.

In 1809 Frascati was annexed to the French Empire, and selected as the capital of the Roman canton.

In autumn 1837, there was a plague epidemic in Rome, and 5,000 people left Rome. Frascati was the only city that opened its doors to them. Since then Frascati's flag has been the same as Rome's, yellow and red. In 1840 the "Accademia Tuscolana" was founded in the city by Cardinal-Bishop Ludovico Micara.

In 1856 the city was chosen as the terminus of the Rome–Frascati railway, the first railway to be built by the Papal State. The last section of the railway line was opened in 1884, 14 years after the city became part of the new Kingdom of Italy. On December 17, 1901, Frascati started to receive electricity from a hydroelectric plant in Tivoli.

In 1906, an electric tram line opened for service between Frascati, Rome and Castelli Romani. The trams traveled wholly along tracks laid down on existing streets as an interurban electric streetcar (light rail). In 1954 the electric tram line was replaced by buses. Another electric tram service, the Rome and Fiuggi Rail Road, called "Vicinali", was opened for service in 1916. It connected Frascati, Monte Porzio Catone, Monte Compatri and San Cesareo. This tram line was destroyed in 1943 and was replaced by buses.

In 1943, during World War II, Frascati was heavily bombed because it contained the German General Headquarters for the Mediterranean zone. Approximately 50% of its buildings, including many monuments, villas and houses, were destroyed. One thousand Italians and 150 Germans died in that air strike and in a second air strike on January 22, 1944, the day of the battle of Anzio (Operation Shingle). The city was liberated from the Nazi German occupation on June 4, 1944, by the 85th Infantry Division. In 1944–1945 the ruins of the buildings were used to fill in a valley, and that land now supports the "8 September Stadium".

== Main sights ==
=== Villas ===
Frascati is famous for its notable villas, which were built from the 16th century onwards by Popes, cardinals and Roman nobles as "status symbols" of Roman aristocracy. These country houses were designed for social activities rather than farming. The villas are substantially well preserved, or have been carefully and authentically restored following damage during World War II.

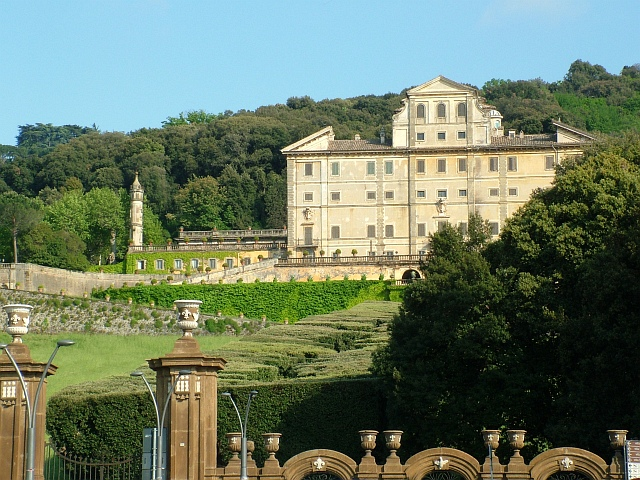
Villa Aldobrandini.

The main villas are:

- Villa Aldobrandini
- Villa Parisi
- Villa Falconieri
- Villa Grazioli
- Villa Lancellotti
- Villa Muti
- Villa Rufinella (or Tuscolana)
- Villa Sora
- Villa Torlonia
- Villa Vecchia
- Villa Mondragone
- Villa Sciarra

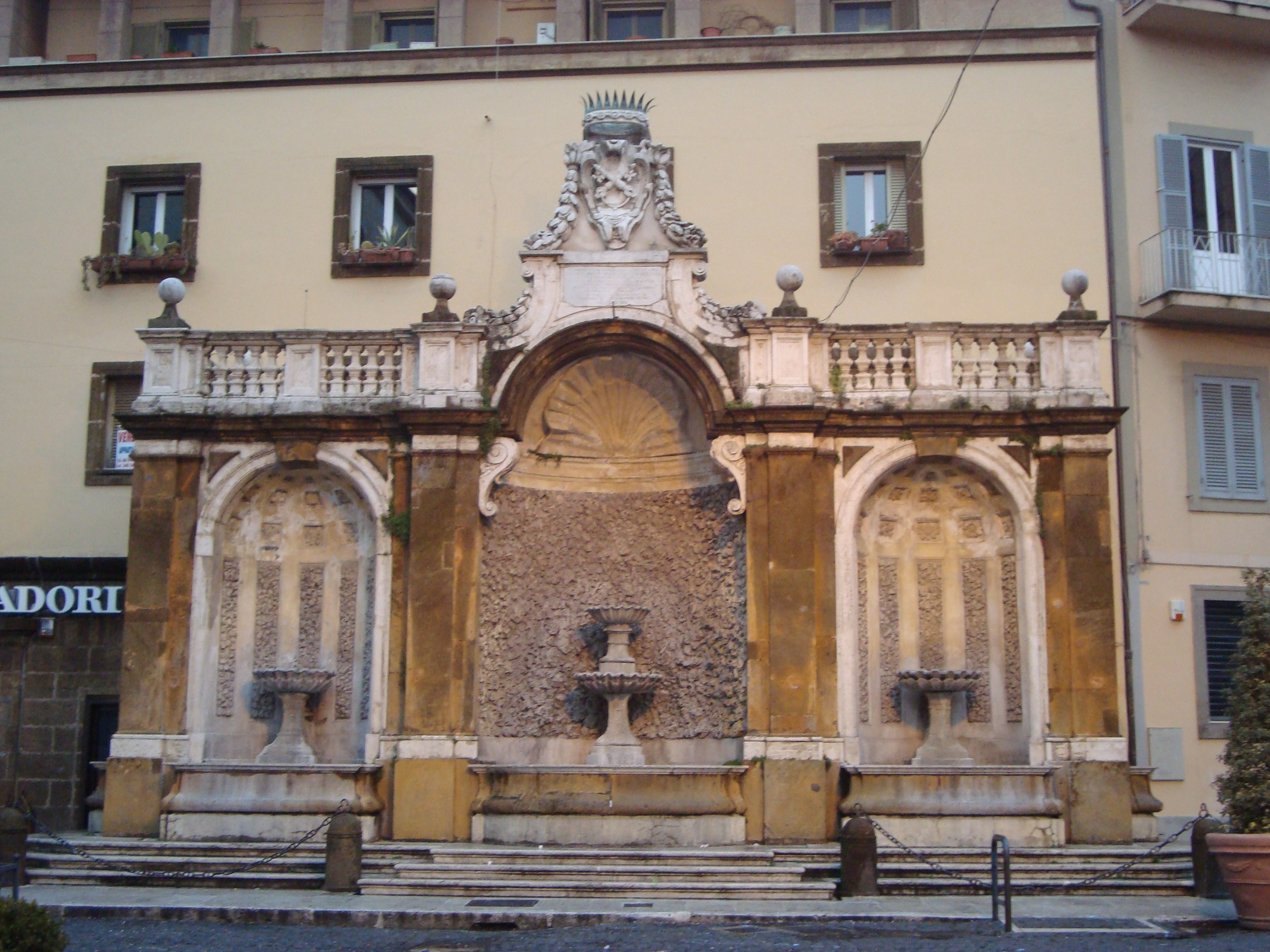
Fountain in Piazza San Pietro surmounted with the papal crossed keys

=== Religious sites ===
- The Cathedral (Cathedral Basilica of St. Peter Apostle) was designed by Ottaviano Nonni, known as "Mascherino", and the original structure was completed in 1598. A new high façade was added between 1698 and 1700 by Gerolamo Fontana. The cathedral was demolished by bombing in 1943, and the reconstructed interior appears bare. On the inner side of the façade is the tombstone of Charles Edward Stuart.
- The Church of the Gesu (Frascati), designed by the Jesuit architect Giovanni De Rosis, was built at the end of the 16th century, and it has niches on the façade with statues attributed to Pietro da Cortona. The most significant feature of the interior is the trompe l'oiel false dome and other architectural features. These were created by Andrea Pozzo and are copied from models developed for the church of Sant'Ignazio in Rome. In 1773 Cardinal Henry Benedict Stuart, Duke of York, reconsecrated the church to the Holy Name of Jesus and to St. Gregory the Great.
- The Bishop's Palace, the old "Rocca" ("Castle"), is a massive construction with two square towers and one rounded one. The Bishop of Frascati resides here. The Palace is flanked by the former cathedral, the church of Santa Maria in Vivario, with a campanile (1305) featuring three orders of three-mullioned windows.
- Santuario della Madonna di Capocroce, which enshrines a Miraculous fresco of the Madonna which was Canonically crowned on 1713. The Madonna di Capocroce is the patroness of the town of Frascati.

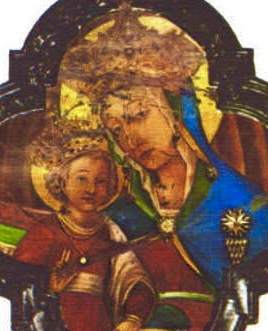
The Miraculous fresco of the Madonna di Capocroce which was crowned in 1713 and is the patroness of Frascati

=== Museums ===
- The civic archaeological museum at the Scuderie Aldobrandini ("Aldobrandini Stables") exhibits archaeological finds from the ancient city of Tusculum and the nearby area. It has scale models of the Tuscolane Villas.
- The Ethiopian Museum of Cardinal Guglielmo Massaia (1809–1889), a missionary who was buried here, in the Capuchin friary, whose church is dedicated to St. Francis of Assisi, houses works by Giulio Romano and Cristoforo Roncalli. It can be visited on request.

== Twin towns – sister cities ==
Frascati is twinned with:

- Bad Godesberg, Germany
- Saint-Cloud, France
- Kortrijk, Belgium
- Windsor and Maidenhead, United Kingdom
- Obninsk, Russia

Each year young people from Frascati and the other towns compete against one another in the Twin Towns Sports Competition, which is hosted in turn by each of the five towns. In the Torlonia Park in Frascati, there are roads named after each of the twin towns.

== Science laboratories ==
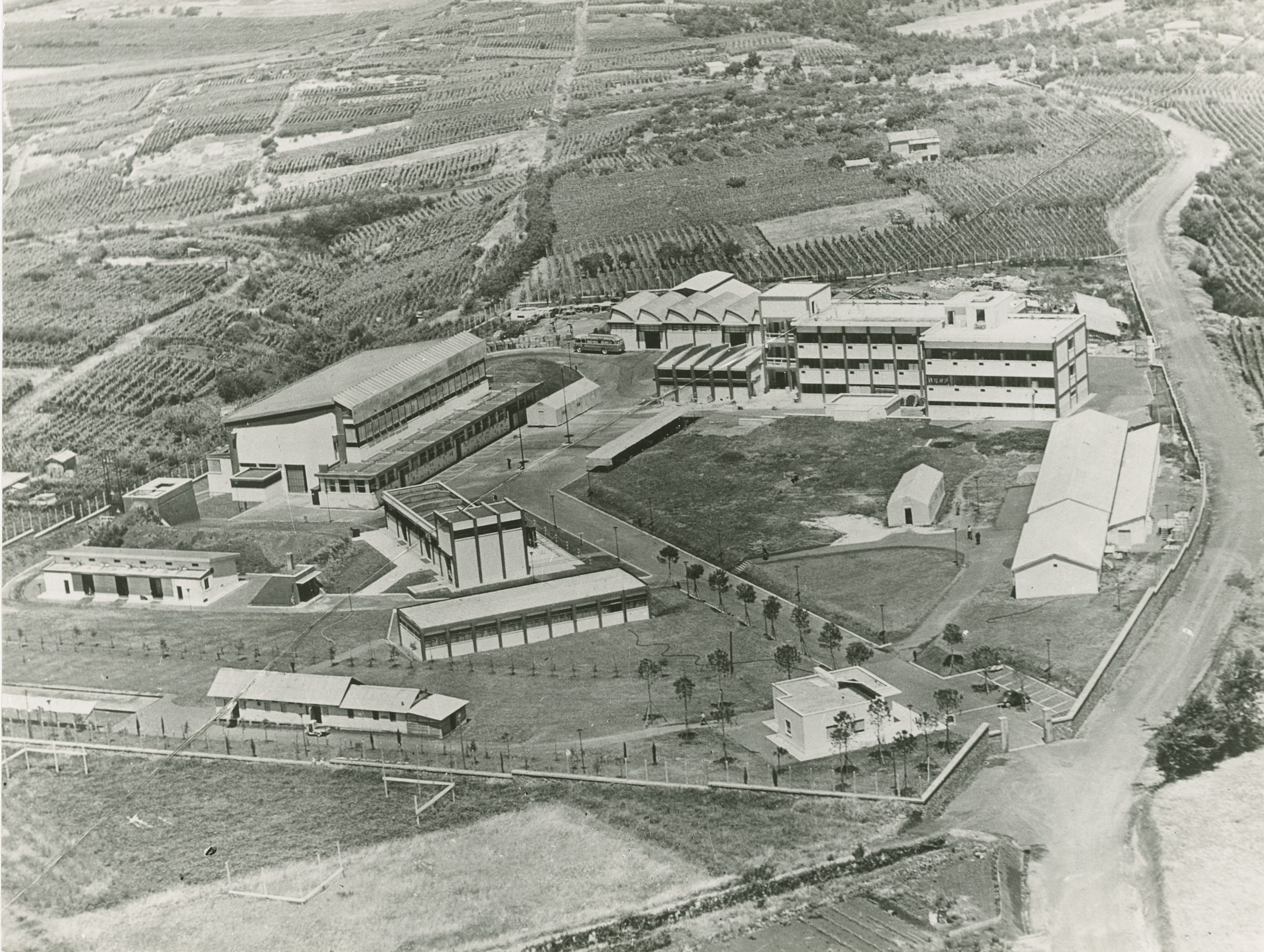
National Laboratory of Frascati in 1960

During the latter half of the 1950s, the first Italian particle accelerator was developed in Frascati by INFN, and the INFN still has a major particle physics laboratory in the town, the Laboratori Nazionali di Frascati. Frascati now also hosts the following laboratories:

- Earth Observation missions of the European Space Agency are based in ESRIN in Frascati.
- Research facilities of ENEA are on the INFN site.
- The Spaceguard Foundation is based here.
- The Frascati Tokamak Upgrade is based here.

The OECD's Frascati Manual, a methodology for research and development statistics, originated from a meeting at the Villa Falconieri in June 1963.

== Literature and music ==
Novels and books partly or wholly set in Frascati include:

- Barbara's History (1864) by Amelia Edwards
- L'improvvisatore (1835) by Hans Christian Andersen
- La Daniella (1857) by George Sand
- Villa Falconieri (1896) by Richard Voss
- Lays of Ancient Rome (1881) by Thomas Babington Macaulay
- Childe Harold Lord Byron
- Days near Rome Augustus Hare
- Chroniques italiennes (1836–1839) by Stendhal
- Roba di Roma (1863) by William Wetmore Story
- The Alban Hills and Frascati (1878) by Clara Louisa Wells

Some operas mention Frascati, including La Frascatana (L'Enfante de Zamora), 1774, by Giovanni Paisiello

== Notable people ==
Frascati was the birthplace of:

- Marco Amelia (1982–), Italian footballer
- Tino Buazzelli (1922–1980), actor
- Giovanni Buttarelli (1957–2019), European data protection supervisor
- Pietro Campilli (1891–1974), politician, deputy and minister
- Hermann David Salomon Corrodi (1844–1905), orientalist painter
- David B. Hooten (1962–), American musician
- Francesca Lollobrigida (1991–), speed skater, four Olympic medals including two golds at the 2026 Winter Olympics
- Arnaldo Mecozzi, (1876–1932), decorator and painter in Brazil
- Vincenzo Mecozzi (1909–1964), decorator and painter in Brazil
- Clemente Micara (1879–1965), Cardinal Bishop
- Ludovico Micara (1775–1847), Cardinal Bishop
- Maffeo Pantaleoni (1857–1924), economist and politician
- Ilaria Salvatori (1979–), Italian foil fencer who won a Bronze medal at the 2008 Summer Olympics
- Mario Titi (1921–1982), landscape painter

Frascati has drawn many famous people to live there for a time including:

- Italo Alighiero Chiusano (1926–1995), poet and writer.
- Princess Pauline Bonaparte, favourite sister of Napoleon I of France and wife of Prince Camillo Borghese, lived in Villa Parisi from 1806 to 1811. At the same time her mother and brother, Lucien Bonaparte, lived in Villa Rufinella from 1804 to 1820.
- Goethe visited the Tuscolo country between 1786 and 1788, staying in Frascati. He recounted his impressions in his journal, (Italian Journey). An important street in the centre of Frascati was named after Goethe.
- Taddeo Kuntze (1730–1793), Polish painter.
- Andrea Pozzo painter and architect, painted the false dome in the fresco of the Chiesa della Gesù (Church of Jesus), a masterpiece of optical illusion.
- The French writer George Sand spent part of her Italian journey in Frascati from March 31 to April 19, 1855, in Villa Lancellotti.
- Henry Benedict Stuart, the younger brother of Charles Edward Stuart ("Bonnie Prince Charlie", who tried unsuccessfully to reconquer the English throne in 1745), became Cardinal Bishop of Frascati in 1761. He became Dean of the College of Cardinals in 1803, but continued to live in the episcopal palace of Frascati until his death on 13 July 1807. He improved the town cultural life by founding the Seminary and library. On the inner side of the Cathedral façade he built the sepulchral stone of his brother.
- The German writer Richard Voss (1851–1918) spent 25 years of his life in the city, writing many of his novels and plays there. He received honorary citizenship of Frascati.
- Clara Louisa Wells, English writer.
- King Charles Emmanuel IV of Sardinia (1751–1819) lived in Villa Lancellotti from 1802.
- Queen Maria Cristina of Bourbon, wife of Charles Felix of Sardinia, lived in Villa Rufinella from 1821.
- Emma Marrone, Italian singer, lives in Frascati.
