= Villa Rufinella =

Villa in Frascati, Italy

Coordinates: 41°48′12″N 12°41′23″E

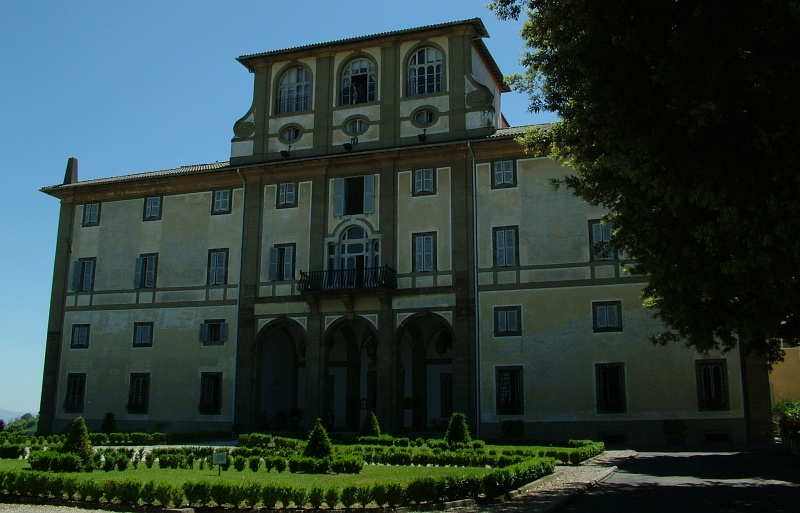
Villa Rufinella

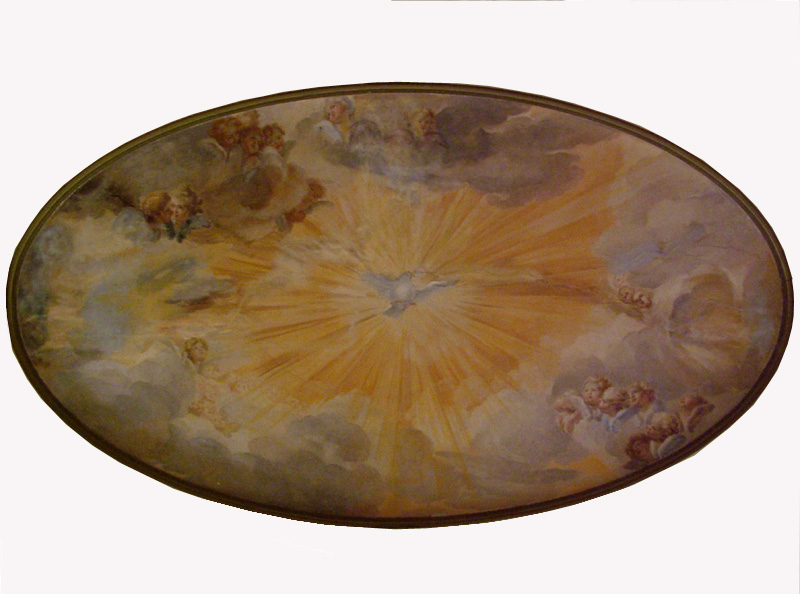
Ceiling fresco in the private chapel inside villa

Villa Rufinella, also called Villa Tuscolana, is a villa in Frascati, Italy.

Villa Rufinella is situated highest of the villas on the hill above the town of Frascati. It was built by Alessandro Ruffini, bishop of Melfi, in 1578, but during its history, the proprietors have made changes in different parts of it. In 1773 the villa became property of the pope. The architect Luigi Vanvitelli, commissioned by the Jesuits, gave the building its present appearance.

In 1804 Pope Pius VII sold the Villa to prince Lucien Bonaparte during his self-imposed exile in Rome. Prince Lucien started the first excavations in the area of the villa and in the territory of Tusculum, sending many of the artifacts found to Paris to be sold on the antiques market. In 1817 a group of bandits of Antonio Gasbarrone's band, commanded by Tommaso Transerici, tried to kidnap the prince during one of his parties in the gardens. Instead of the prince, the bandits kidnapped one of his guests, an artist named Charles de Chatillôn, who softened the bandits by painting portraits of them during his captivity. The Prince was so annoyed by the attack that he sold the villa soon thereafter.

In 1820 the villa passed into the possession of Princess Maria Anna of Savoy. Queen Maria Christina of Naples and Sicily, wife of Charles Felix of Sardinia, inherited the villa from her, and lived there for long periods until 1843. In 1834, to commemorate his stay as a guest in the villa, the Italian poet Giuseppe Gioachino Belli wrote a sonnet in Roman dialect called "La Rufinella". After 1848 the Villa became the property of King Vittorio Emanuele II, who sold it to the Lancellotti family.

The villa suffered heavy damage during World War II (1943–1944). Since 1966 the Villa Rufinella has been owned by the Salesians of Don Bosco, a Roman Catholic religious society: they have restored the building and turned it into a conference hotel.

Cicero's villa may have been located near the Villa Rufinella.

== See also ==
- Luigi Vanvitelli
