= Villa Sora =

Building in Frascati, Italy

Coordinates: 41°48′38″N 12°40′12″E

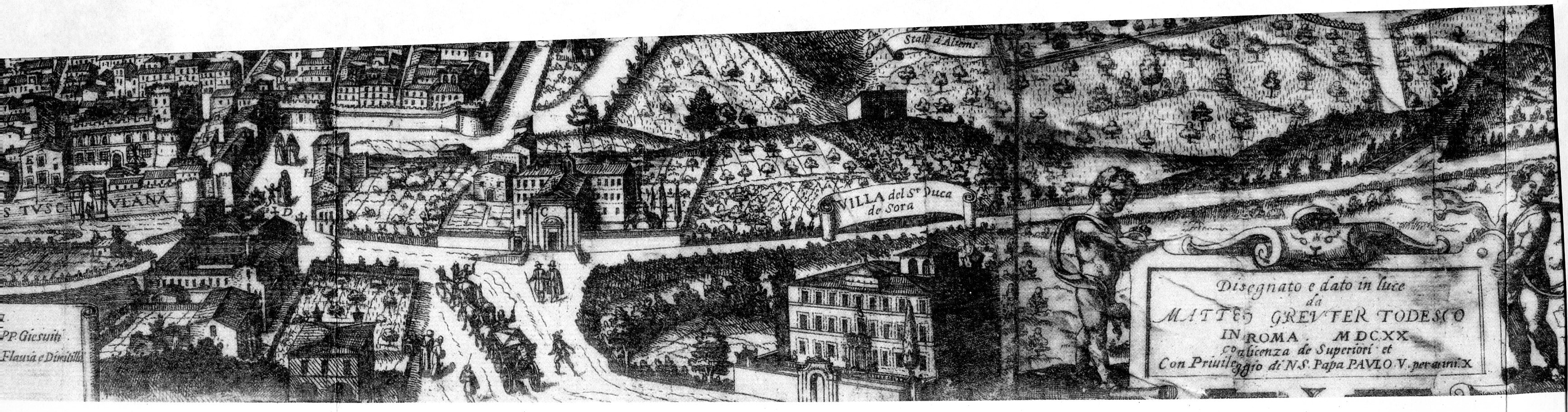
Print of Matteo Greuter 1620 - Villa Sora

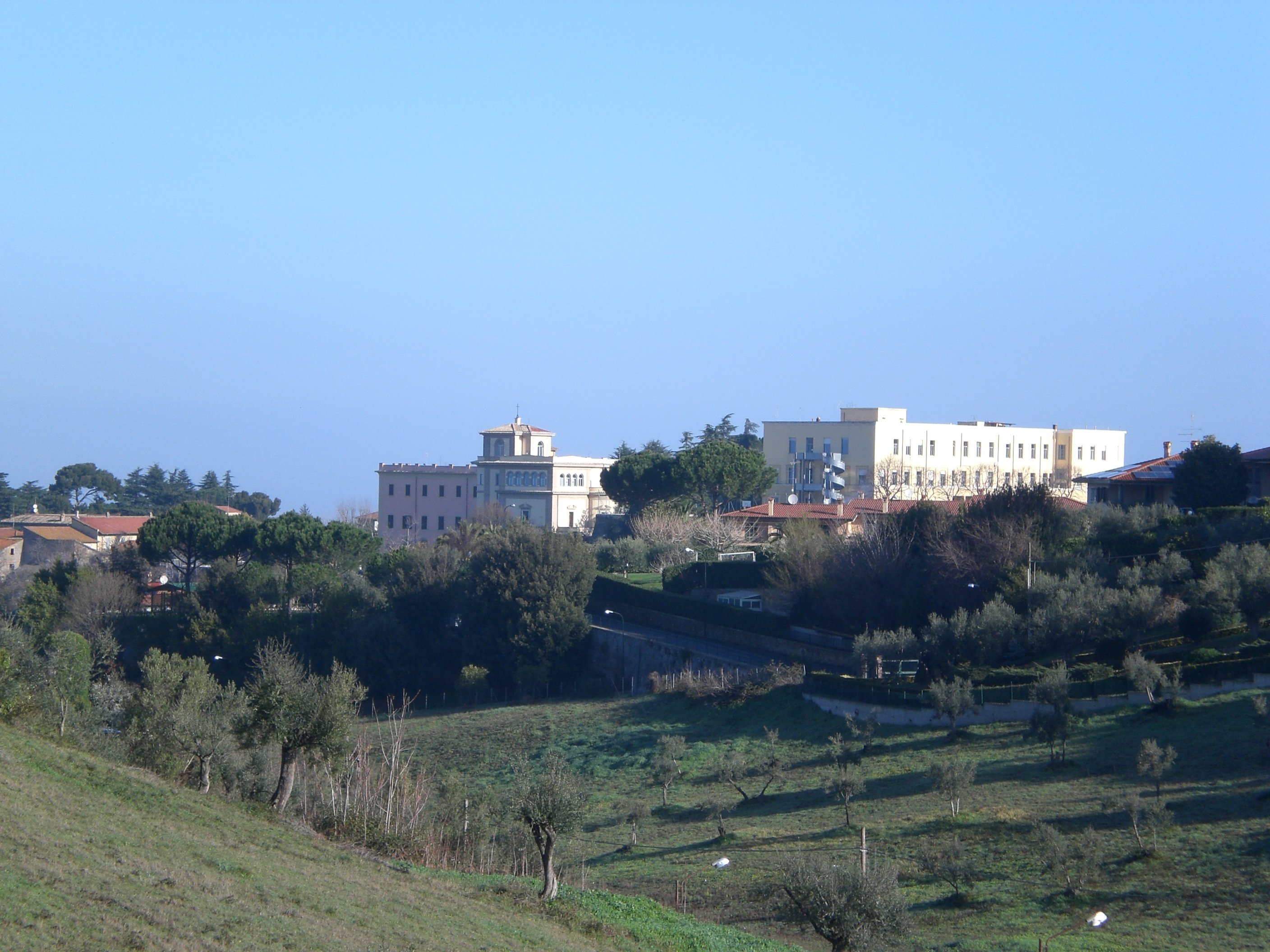
South view of Villa Sora

The Villa Sora in Frascati, Italy was built at the end of 16th century by Giacomo Boncompagni, duke of Sora, natural son of Pope Gregory XIII. In the central hall there are painted fresco decorations of Cavalier D'Arpino(17th century). Frescoes by Flemish artists are in two lodges, opposite the villa (Cornelius Scut and Timan Craft).

The villa nowadays houses a school of the Salesians.

== Sources ==
- Wells Clara Louisa - The Alban Hills, Vol. I: Frascati - 1878 publisher: Barbera, Rome, Italy - OCLC 21996251
