= Villa Muti =

Coordinates: 41°48′06″N 12°40′21″E

Villa Muti is a villa in Frascati, Italy, now in the communal territory of Grottaferrata.

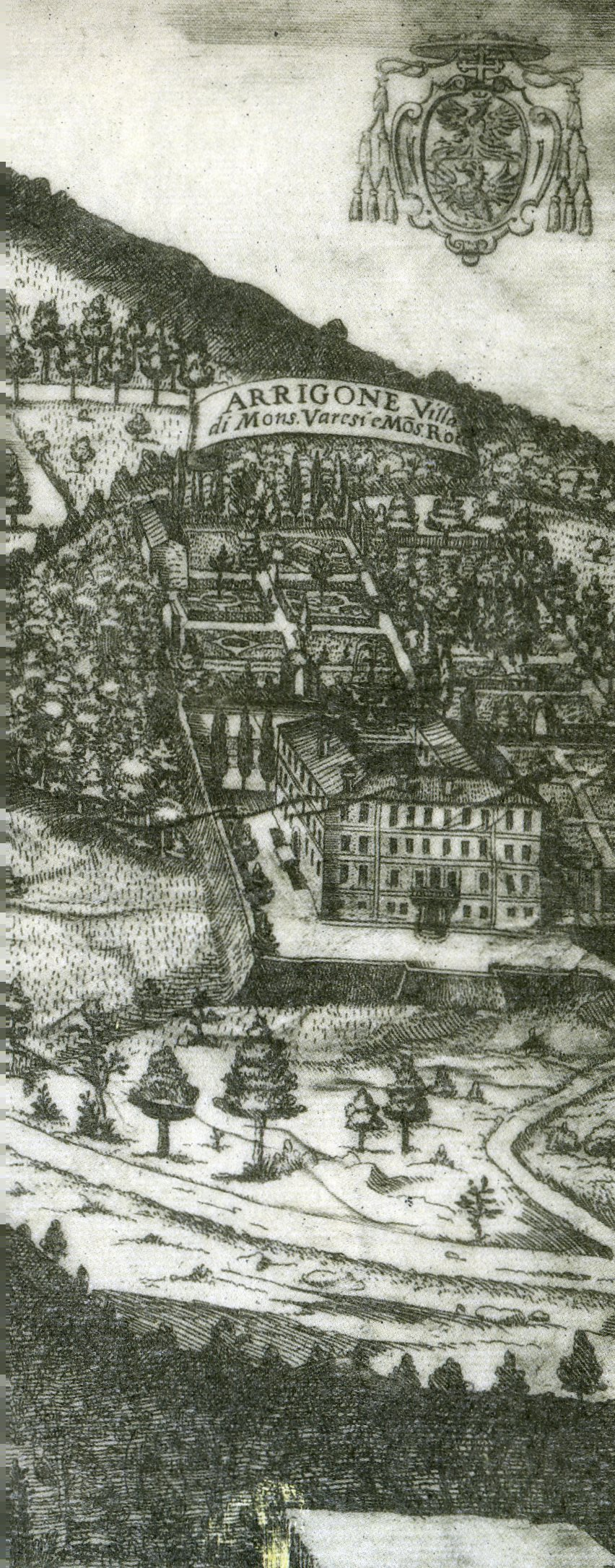
Print of Matteo Greuter 1620 - Villa Muti

== History ==
Initial construction on the site was started in 1579 by Ludovico Cerasoli. The locale was then acquired in 1595 by the soon to be Cardinal, Pompeo Arrigoni and then divided into two parts and given to relatives including his nephew Cardinal Ciriaco Rocci. Later the villa was modified by different owners including Cesarini and the Amadei.

The Muti family, who had obtained the property in the 1900s sold it at the end of World War II to the municipality of Grottaferrata.

== Features ==
Inside there are frescoes by two major High Baroque artists: Giovanni Lanfranco (Meeting of Judah and Tamar, Joseph and his Brothers and Susanna Surprised While Bathing) and Pietro da Cortona (Daniel in the Lion's Den and Story of Habbakuk). Frescoes of History of Agar are by the artist Ludovico Cigoli and of Moses on the Mount by Domenico Passignano are in the first-floor rooms.

The villa has also elegant formal/English gardens of the villa with scenographic effects characterized by fantastic sculptures typical of Roman Mannerism; it is structured on various levels of different historical stratification of landscape created around 1850.

Presently the villa is not open to the public and the gardens lack upkeep.

== Sources ==
- Villas of the Castelli Romani
