= Roman Castles =

Group of towns close to Rome

Coordinates: 41°45′07″N 12°43′51″E

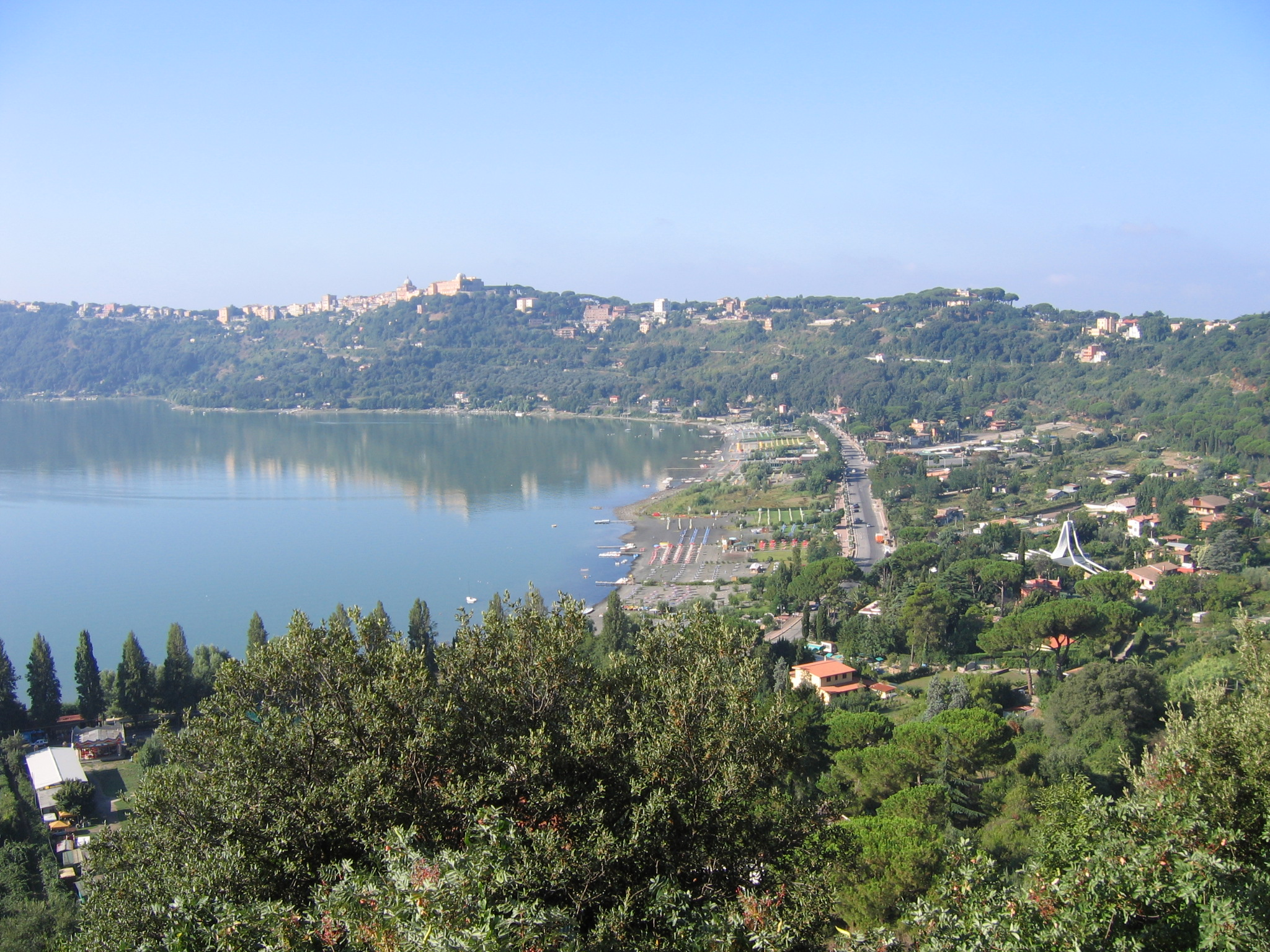
Castel Gandolfo overlooking Lake Albano

The Roman Castles (Italian: Castelli Romani) are a group of comuni in the Metropolitan City of Rome. They are located a short distance south-east of the city of Rome, at the feet of the Alban Hills, in the territory corresponding to the Old Latium.

== Overview ==
The castles are situated in a fertile volcanic area which has allowed since ancient times a flourishing agriculture. The former crater is occupied by two lakes, Nemi and Albano.

Beginning in the ancient Roman era, it was an area frequented by the noblemen of Rome for its fresher climate during summer; the tradition was followed by the Popes, who still have their summer residence in Castel Gandolfo, on Lake Albano. Families which ruled in the area include Orsini, Colonna, Chigi, Aldobrandini, Savelli, Annibaldi and Ruspoli. Some of the villas they built at Monte Tuscolo are known as the Ville Tuscolane.

== Municipalities ==
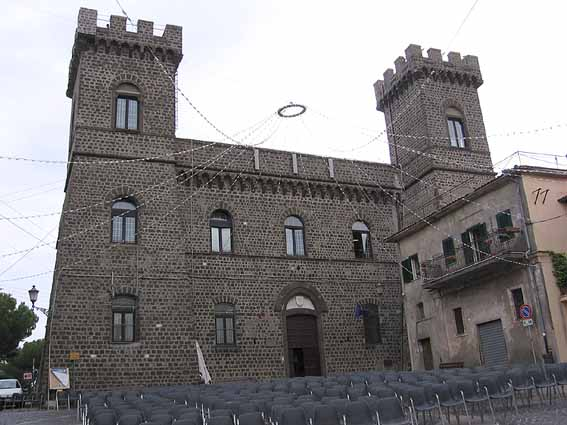
The Savelli Castle in Rocca Priora

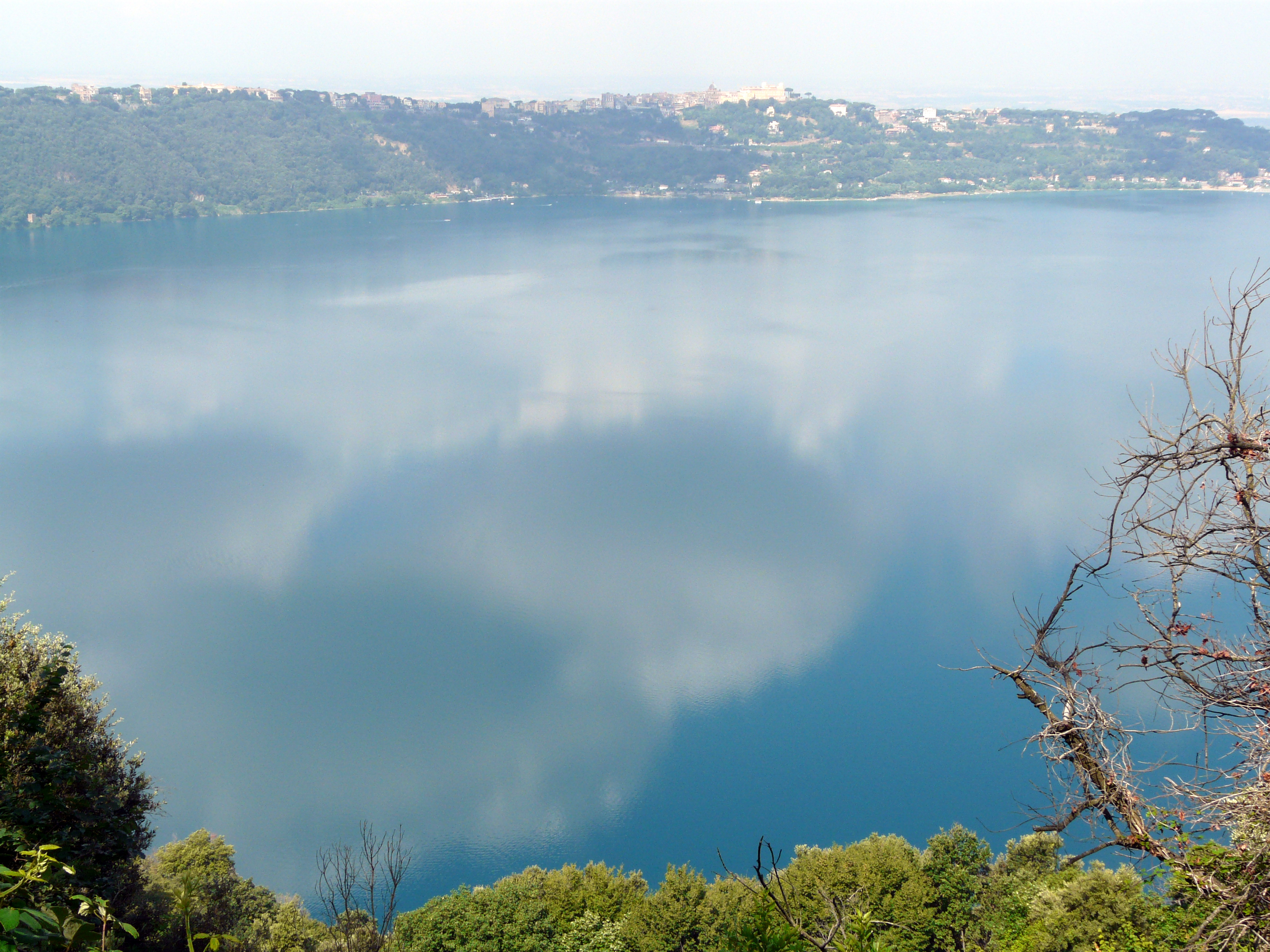
The Lake Albano; Castel Gandolfo is visible in the background.

The Roman Castles are:

- Albano Laziale
- Ariccia
- Castel Gandolfo
- Colonna
- Frascati
- Genzano di Roma
- Grottaferrata
- Lanuvio
- Lariano (a frazione of Velletri until 1969)
- Marino
- Monte Compatri
- Monte Porzio Catone
- Nemi
- Rocca di Papa
- Rocca Priora
- Velletri (a Free Commune during Middle Ages, but geographically considered a Roman Castle)

== Cuisine ==
Since 1996, the Roman Castles area has been home to a large denominazione di origine controllata (DOC) zone that makes a wide variety of wine including rosés, slightly sparkling frizzantes and both dry and sweet wines. The DOC red and rosés are composed of Cesanese Comune, Merlot, Montepulciano, Nero Buono and Sangiovese with up to 15% of other local red grape varieties such as Abbuoto. The white wines of the region are composed of Malvasia Candia, Puntinata and Trebbiano with up to 30% of other local white grape varieties. Grapes destined for DOC production must be harvested to a yield no greater than 12 tonnes/hectare with the white and rosés attaining a minimum alcohol level of at least 10.5% and the reds being having at least 11% alcohol by volume.

Ariccia is celebrated for its porchetta (roasted pork meat). Local sweets include maritozzi, a kind of sweet bun. From the harvest of wine grapes, wine must is used to bake ciambelle al mosto a large donut-shaped flat cake which can be found in the local bakeries.

== See also ==
- History of Rome
- History of Lazio
- Sanctuary of Santa Maria dell'Acquasanta
- Palazzo Colonna (Marino)
- Historic centre of Albano Laziale
