= Bassano Romano =

- Comune
- Comune di Bassano Romano
- Coat of arms

- Location within Italy Location within Lazio
- Coordinates: 42°13′N 12°11′E
- Country: Italy
- Region: Lazio
- Province: Viterbo (VT)

Area
  - Total: 37.46 km^{2} (14.46 sq mi)
- Elevation: 360 m (1,180 ft)

Population (2019)
  - Total: 4,729
  - Density: 126.2/km^{2} (327.0/sq mi)
- Demonym: Bassanesi
- Time zone: UTC+1 (CET)
  - Summer (DST): UTC+2 (CEST)
- Postal code: 01030
- Dialing code: 0761
- Patron saint: San Gratiliano
- Saint day: August 12
- Website: Official website

Bassano Romano is a town and comune situated in the hills of Monti Sabatini in the province of Viterbo, in northern Lazio (Italy). With its origins about 1000 as the agricultural hamlet of Bassano di Sutri the village's future was founded in 1160 by the wealthy landowner Enotrio Serco, who initiated the construction at the top of the slope of a fortified residence that over the centuries became a princely dwelling, frescoed by famous artists. In 1482 Pope Sixtus IV assigned the Foedus Bassani to the Anguillara, Roman patricians (patrizii di Roma). The growth of the comune redoubled after 1565, when the signory was reassigned by Pope Clement VIII to the Giustiniani, merchants of Genoese origin settled at Rome. In 1605 the signory was raised to a marquessate: a hunting lodge (casina di caccia) called "La Rocca", granaries, a stone bridge (the ponte delle Vaschie) and the church dedicated to San Vincenzo were all constructed. During the Giustiniani residence, artists were commissioned to carry out frescoes: Francesco Albani, Domenico Zampieri "Domenichino" and Antonio Tempesta are all represented. In 1644, a bulla of Pope Innocent X made the marchese of Bassano a prince, and the flock of papal and noble visitors included James Stuart, pretender to the thrones of England and Scotland. In 1735, under Giustiniani patronage the maiolica manufactory of Bartolomeo Terchi was transferred here from Siena.

Various epidemics struck Bassano during the 18th century, in 1709, 1770 and 1786. In 1799, the French forces of Napoleon attacked Bassano no less than four times.

In 1854 the fief passed from the Giustiniani to the Odescalchi. During World War II Bassano was the site of several conflicts. In 1964 the commune's name was changed to Bassano Romano.
