= Villa Lancellotti =

Villa in Frascati, Italy

Coordinates: 41°48′23″N 12°41′00″E

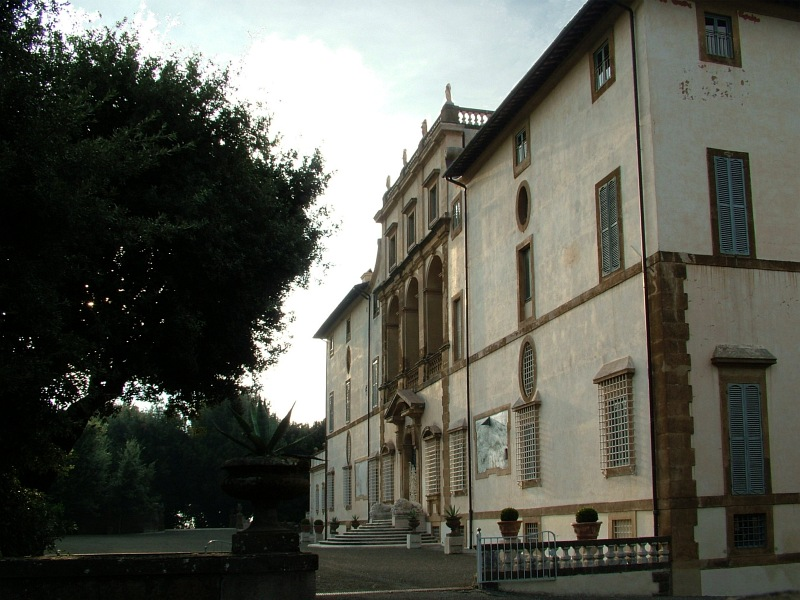
Villa Lancellotti facade

Villa Lancellotti is a villa in Frascati, Italy, the nearest to the town centre. This villa was constructed in 1582 by Cardinal Bonanni. It was sold in 1617 to the banker Roberto Primo who constructed the 'teatro d'acqua' (water theatre) at the far end of the garden. The theatre is a direct copy of that at the nearby Villa Mondragone, for whom Primo acted as a banker. The clock, or 'orologio' was added in the nineteenth century while the villa was in the ownership of the Lancellotti family.

The villa was restored in 1730, by the new owner Prince Pietro Piccolomini. In 1840 the Villa, called Villa Piccolomini, was sold to Francis Mehlem of Bavaria. The villa was bought and restored in 1866 by Prince Filippo Massimo Lancellotti and his wife Princess Elisabetta Borghese Aldobrandini.

King Charles Emmanuel IV of Sardinia, lived here, and in October 1805 he received Pope Pius VII as a guest.

In 1855 the famous writer George Sand rented the Villa Piccolomini from March 31 to April 19 and lived here with her son Maurice and her secretary Alexandre Manceau.

The facade of the palace offers views of the garden from every floor, and panoramic views of Tuscolo hill. The inside contains rooms decorated with older paintings by Ciro Ferri (1634–1689) featuring allegorical scenes of the countryside. The Italian garden encloses a nymphaeum from the 16th century. In the hall there is a mosaic in white and black tesseras found in Tuscolo hill, near the local Camaldolese monastery, in 1863. Statues found during the archeological excavation of Tusculum are the decoration of the Villa.

A part of the gardens, now called "Ombrellino", today is a public park. Views of the garden facade of this villa can be had from Tuscolo's road.

The villa is no longer open to the public.

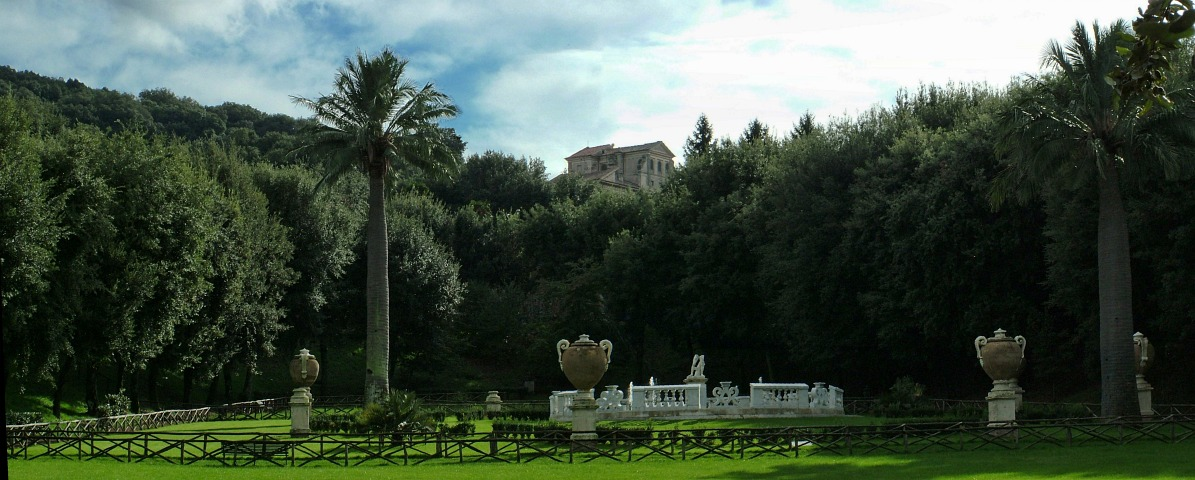
Ombrellino Park.

== Sources ==
- Wells Clara Louisa - The Alban Hills, Vol. I: Frascati - 1878 publisher: Barbera, Rome, Italy - OCLC 21996251
