= Villa Mondragone =

Patrician villa in the territory of Monte Porzio Caton, Italy

Coordinates: 41°48′33″N 12°41′49″E

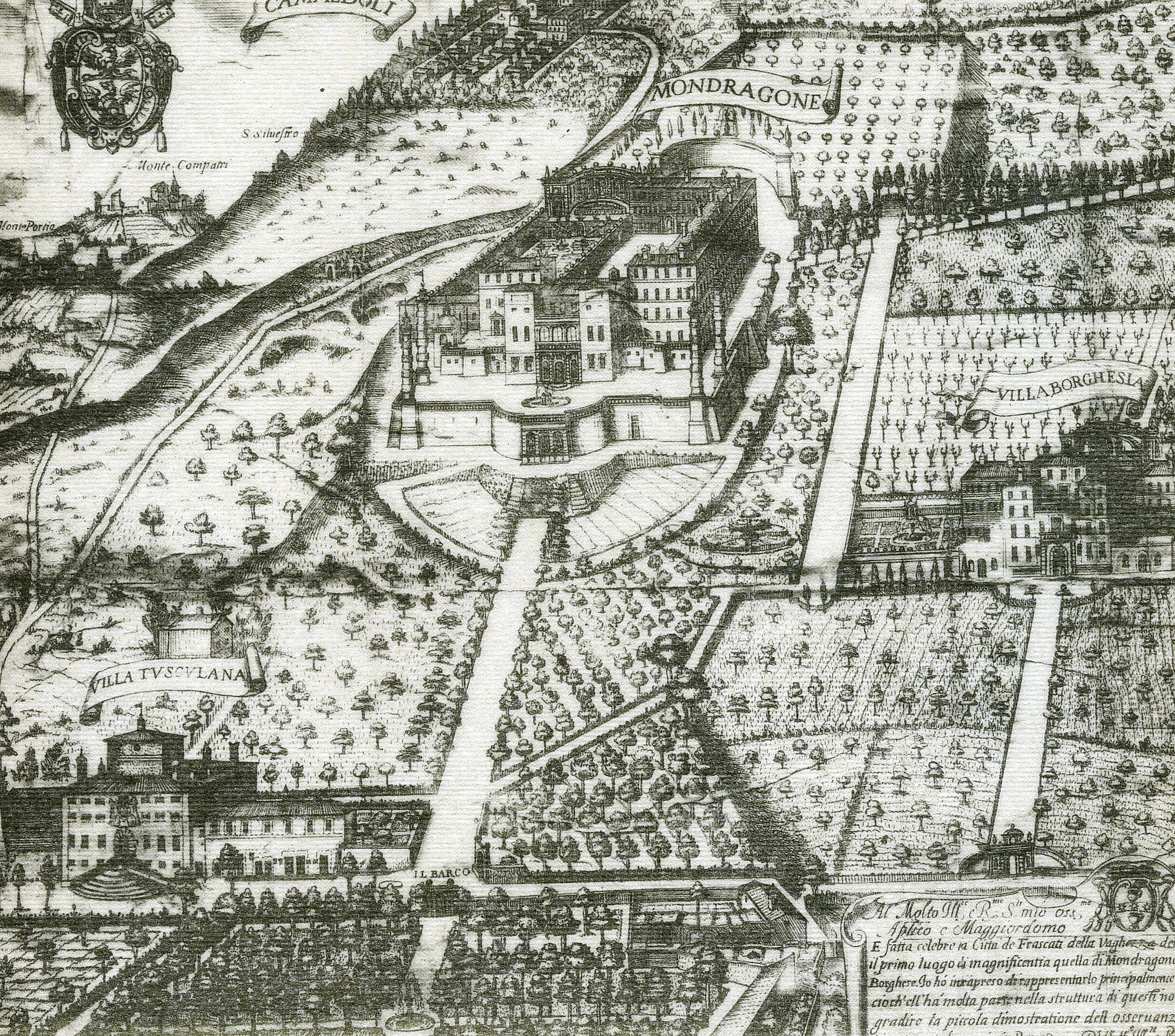
The Villa Mondragone in 1620, etching of Matthaeus Greuter

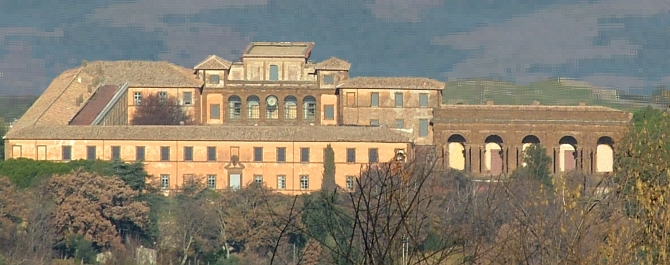
View of Villa Mondragone from Tusculum.

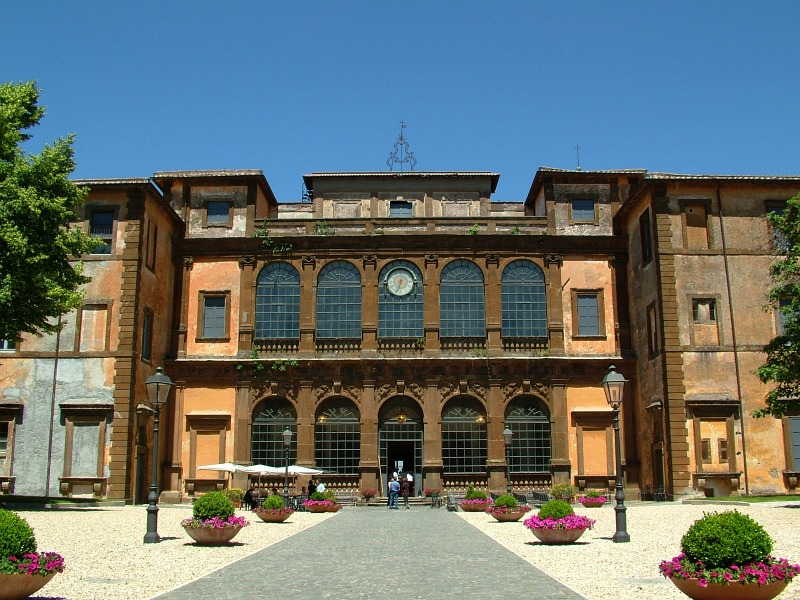
Villa Mondragone.

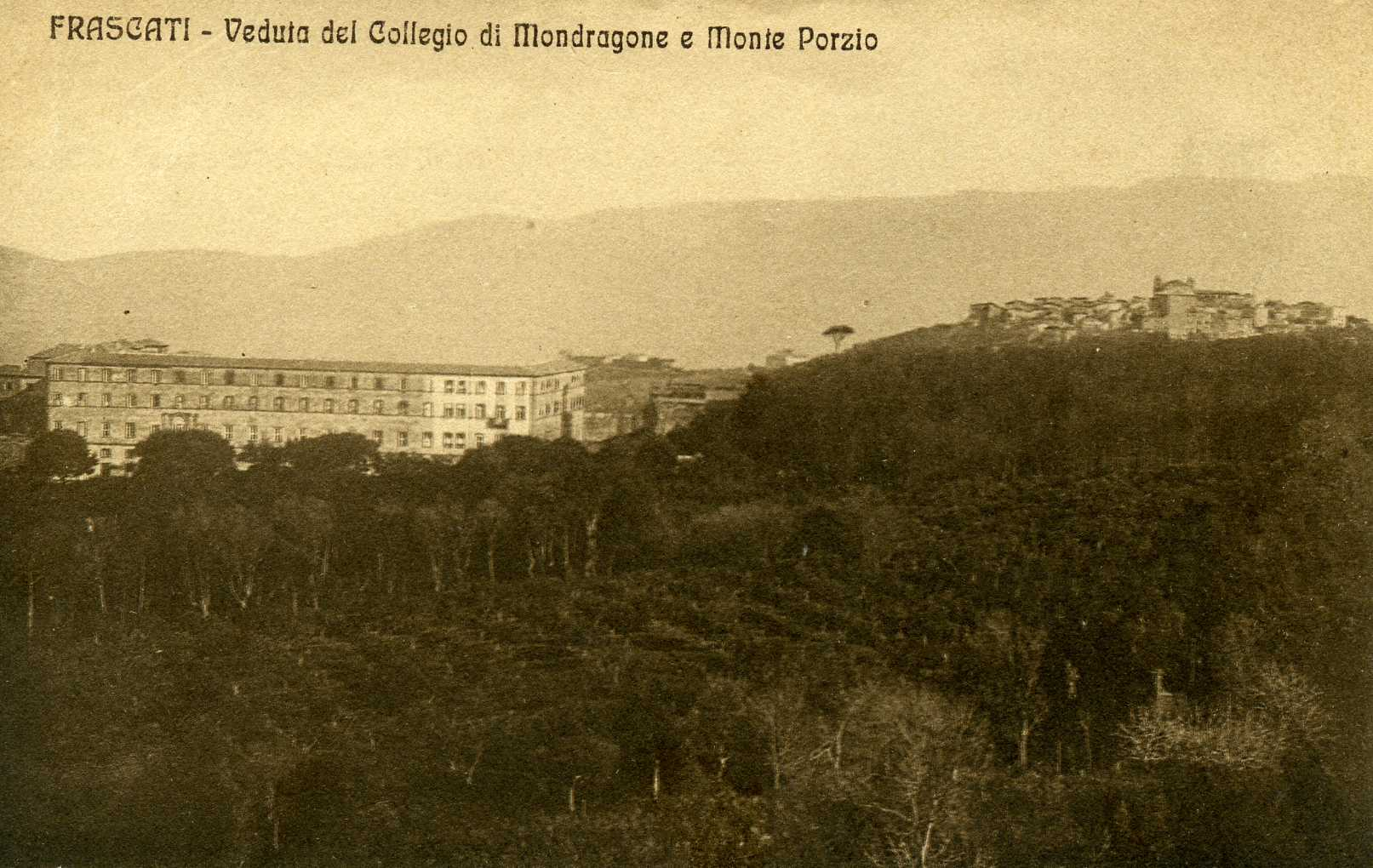
Postcard of Villa Mondragone at the beginning of the 20th century.

Villa Mondragone is a patrician villa originally in the territory of the Italian comune of Frascati (Latium, central Italy), now in the territory of Monte Porzio Catone (Alban Hills). It lies on a hill 416m above sea-level, in an area called, from its many castles and villas, Castelli Romani about 20 km (12 mi) southeast of Rome, near the ancient town of Tusculum.

Construction began in 1573 by Cardinal Mark Sittich von Hohenems Altemps, who commissioned the design for it and for the Palazzo Altemps in central Rome from Martino Longhi the Elder, on the site of the remains of a Roman villa of the consular family of the Quinctilii.

Pope Gregory XIII, whose heraldic dragon led to calling the villa "Mondragone", used the villa regularly as a summer residence, as guest of Cardinal Altemps. It was at the Villa Mondragone that in 1582, Gregory promulgated the document (the papal bull "Inter gravissimas") which initiated the reform of the calendar now in use and known as the Gregorian calendar.

Villa Mondragone was at its maximum splendour during the epoch of the Borghese family (including Cardinal Scipione Borghese and Pope Paul V), who exhibited parts of their art and antiquities collections there (including the Antinous Mondragone which derives its name from the villa).

Other popes who passed long periods in Villa Mondragone include Clement VIII and Paul V. In 1620, the owners of the villa bequeathed the Mondragone library to the Vatican Library.

Starting from 1626, Pope Urban VIII decided to leave Villa Mondragone in favour of the Papal residence of Castelgandolfo.

In 1858 George Sand was guest in the villa, and found there a suitable atmosphere for the setting of her novel La Daniella. In 1865 the Jesuits turned it into a college, the Nobile Collegio Mondragone, for young aristocrats, which operated until 1953.

During the Second World War the college was also used as a shelter for evacuees.

In 1981 it was sold by the Order of the Jesuits to the University, where as of modern times, the Villa remains a peripheral seat of the University of Rome Tor Vergata.

In 1912 Wilfrid Michael Voynich acquired the famous Voynich manuscript from the Jesuits at the Villa Mondragone. The facility, in need of funds, was discreetly selling some of its holdings. Voynich purchased 30 manuscripts, one of which was later to be known as the Voynich manuscript, though the work itself purportedly dates to the early 15th century. There is, however, dissent among researchers as to its origin. Correspondence from the period indicates that the transaction was facilitated in part by members of the Jesuit college staff, among them a Father Strickland, who coordinated the documentation of the sale on behalf of the college.

== See also ==
- List of Jesuit sites

== Sources ==
- Tracy Lee Ehrlich: Landscape and Identity in Early Modern Rome. Cambridge University Press, 2002.
- Tracy Lee Ehrlich: The Villa Mondragone and Early Seventeenth-Century Villeggiatura at Frascati. Dissertation Columbia University, UMI, 1995.
- Laura Marcucci, Bruno Torresi: Declino e rinascita di Villa Mondragone: progetti, restauri, trasformazioni. In: Quaderni dell'instituto di storia dell'architettura. 1983, pp. 471–490.
- Wells Clara Louisa The Alban Hills, Vol. I: Frascati – 1878 publisher: Barbera, Rome, Italy – OCLC 21996251
