= Monte Porzio Catone =

- Comune
- Comune di Monte Porzio Catone
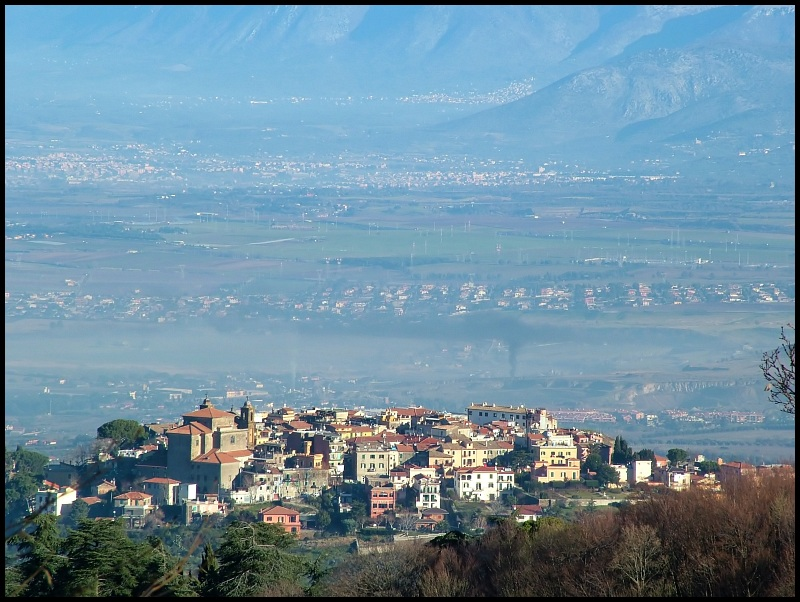
- View of Monte Porzio Catone

- Coat of arms

- Location within Italy Location within Lazio
- Coordinates: 41°49′N 12°43′E
- Country: Italy
- Region: Lazio
- Metropolitan city: Rome (RM)
- Frazioni: Armetta, Camaldoli, Fontana Candida, Massarosa, Monte Ciuffo, Pilozzo, Pratone - Belvedere, San Marco, Selve di Mondragone, Suore Domenicane di Betania, Villa Vecchia

Government
  - Mayor: Massimo Pulcini

Area
  - Total: 9.4 km^{2} (3.6 sq mi)
- Elevation: 451 m (1,480 ft)

Population (30 November 2017)
  - Total: 8,720
  - Density: 930/km^{2} (2,400/sq mi)
- Demonym: Monteporziani
- Time zone: UTC+1 (CET)
  - Summer (DST): UTC+2 (CEST)
- Postal code: 00078
- Dialing code: 06
- Patron saint: St. Antoninus Martyr
- Saint day: 2 September
- Website: Official website

Monte Porzio Catone is a comune (municipality) in the Metropolitan City of Rome in the central Italian region of Latium, located about 20 kilometres (12 mi) southeast of Rome, on the Alban Hills.

Monte Porzio Catone borders the following municipalities: Frascati, Grottaferrata, Monte Compatri and Rome.

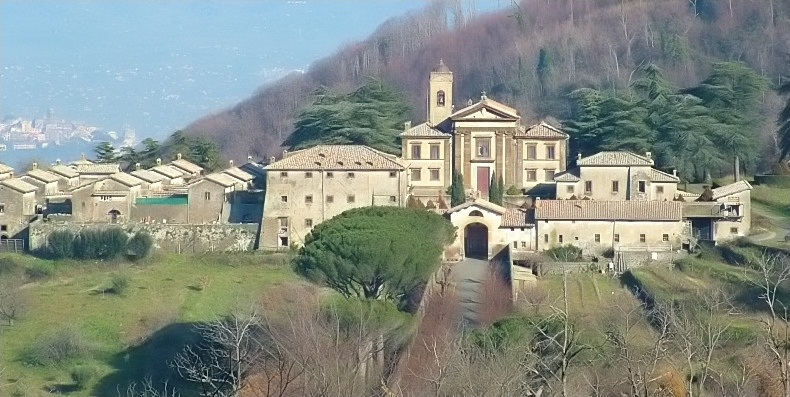
Tusculan Hermitage of Camaldoli.

== Main sights ==
- The Astronomical Rome Observatory is located 2 kilometres (1.2 mi) from the city centre. It was built starting from 1939, being finished in 1965. It rises above the remains of a Roman villa, the "Matidia's Villa", from the first century AD. The imposing construction is rationalist in style and was used for preserving the equipment of the National Observatory in Rome; subsequently it became a structure to promote the astronomic and scientific studies. Currently the observatory is endowed with the Astrolab and other didactic resources for initiatives to schools, university, associative and private groups.
- The Tusculan Hermitage Monastery was founded in 1607 by Camaldolese Monks of Monte Corona. In 1613 the building was completed. The convent's church is devoted to Saint Romuald. The hospitality to male pilgrims by the hermits is guaranteed. Women are forbidden entry to the Hermitage. An inscription on the wooden door reads, in Latin: "Ecce Elongavi Fugiens et Mansi In Solitudine" (Here I have fled from the world and I established my home in solitude).
- Other sights include the church of St. Gregory the Great, erected in 1666 by Carlo Rainaldi for the Borghese family, and the remains of the ancient Tusculum.
- Villa Mondragone

== See also ==
- Battle of Monte Porzio

== Twin towns ==
- Saint-Michel-l'Observatoire, France
