= Matthaeus Greuter =

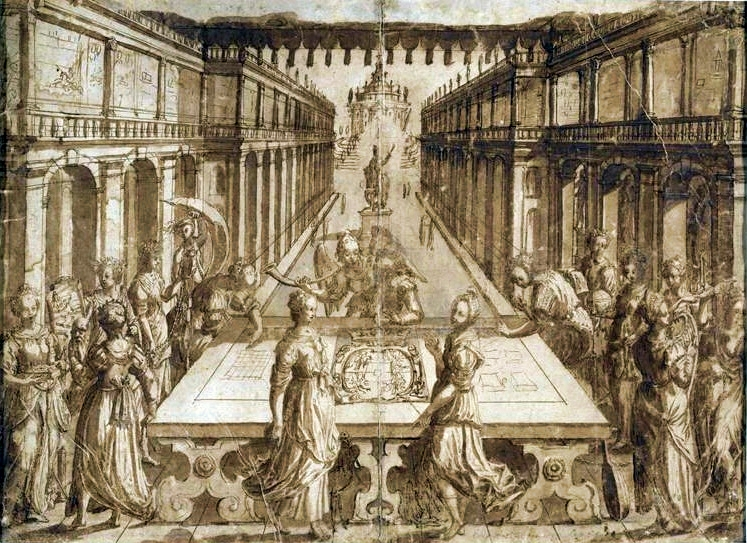
The Seven Liberal Arts, engraving by Greuter

Matthaeus Greuter (1564–1638), known in Italian as Matteo Greuter, was a German etcher and engraver who worked in Rome. He is known for his cartographical prints.

Born in Strasbourg, Greuter worked in France, in Avignon and Lyon. Apparently to escape the "strong intellectual and commercial pressure of Dutch cartographic publishing", in 1606, he went to Rome where he produced works for Cardinal Scipione Borghese, Pope Paul V, for the Accademia dei Lincei, and Pope Urban VIII. He created the copperplate etchings of sunspots for Galileo's Letters on Sunspots and the illustrations for Christoph Scheiner's Rosa Ursina.

Greuter is best known for his plans and maps. He created architectural prints depicting Villa Mondragone, Villa Parisi and other notable buildings. He also produced a large number of maps, most notably those designed to be used for globes. His first globe map of the world was created in 1632 and was dedicated to Jacobo Boncompagno. It was based on an earlier globe by Willem Blaeu. The inclusion of Hokkaido indicates that he updated the design to take account of new discoveries, as the island was not known to Blaeu, but was documented by another map maker in Rome. He made a "celestial globe" depicting the constellations in 1635, also based on Blaeu, who had used the data of Tycho Brahe. He appears to have updated the globe later. He also designed reduced-size globes between 1636 and 1638.

Other works were book frontispieces, portraits and allegorical designs. His satirical print of "Doctor Wurmbrandt" purging human follies was later adapted by Martin Droeshout.
