= List of Irene Aloisi performances =

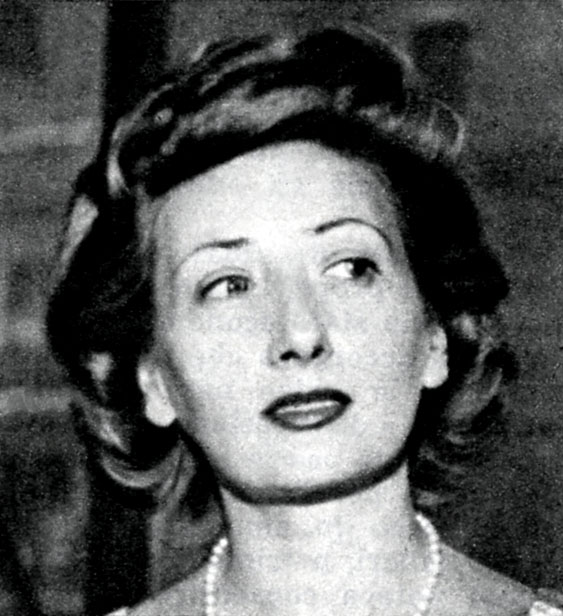
Italian actress Irene Aloisi (1957)

Italian actress Irene Aloisi, was known for her performances in Orgoglio e pregiudizio (1957), Le inchieste del commissario Maigret (1964), and Le tue mani sul mio corpo (1970). During her career, she worked in cinema, television, radio, and theatre.

== Filmography ==
=== Cinema ===
| Year | Title | Director | Ref. |
|---|---|---|---|
| 1954 | Peppino e la vecchia signora | Piero Ballerini | |
| 1954 | Le signorine dello 04 | Gianni Franciolin | |
| 1955 | La ragazza di Via Veneto | Marino Girolami | |
| 1958 | Le bellissime gambe di Sabrina | Camillo Mastrocinque | |
| 1959 | Roulotte e roulette | Turi Vasile | |
| 1960 | La giornata balorda | Mauro Bolognini | |
| 1960 | Il sicario | Damiano Damiani | |
| 1961 | Gli attendenti | Giorgio Bianchi | |
| 1961 | Totò, Peppino e... la dolce vita | Sergio Corbucci | |
| 1963 | Le ore dell'amore | Luciano Salce | |
| 1964 | Amore mio | Raffaello Matarazzo | |
| 1969 | Puro siccome un Angelo papà mi fece monaco... di Monza | Giovanni Grimald | |
| 1970 | Cerca di capirmi | Mariano Laurenti | |
| 1971 | Le tue mani sul mio corpo | Brunello Rondi | |
| 1971 | La lunga ombra del lupo | Gianni Manera | |
| 1976 | Bruciati da cocente passione | Giorgio Capitani | |

=== Television ===
| Date | Title | Writer | Director | Notes | Ref. |
|---|---|---|---|---|---|
| 22 May 1955 | Catene | Allan Langdon Martin | Anton Giulio Majano | | |
| 1957 | Orgoglio e pregiudizio | Edoardo Anton | Daniele D'Anza | D'anza directed script | |
| 24 July 1960 | Giallo club. Invito al poliziesco | Mario Casacci | Guglielmo Morandi | Morandi directed first episode: la morte | |
| 23 August 1960 | Souper | Ferenc Molnár | Vito Molinari | | |
| 23 October 1960 | La Pisana | Ippolito Nievo | Giacomo Vaccari | Vaccari directed first episode | |
| 5 March 1961 | Giallo club. Invito al poliziesco | Mario Casacci | Guglielmo Morandi | Episode: Omicidio Quiz | |
| 20 August 1962 | Il paese delle vacanze | Ugo Betti | Guglielmo Morandi | | |
| 18 January 1963 | Le gioie della famiglia | Philippe Hériat | Gian Paolo Callegari | | |
| 28 January 1963 | La granduchessa e il cameriere | Flaminio Bollini | | | |
| 11 December 1963 | Il testimone | | Guglielmo Morandi | | |
| 1 March 1964 | La cittadella | | Anton Giulio Majano | Fourth episode | |
| 16 January 1965 | La data | | Giuliana Berlinguer | | |
| 25 February 1965 | Il guastafeste | | Giuliana Berlinguer | | |
| 21 October 1965 | Bello di papà | Guglielmo Morandi and Belisario Randone | Mario Ferrero | | |
| 20 February 1966 | Le inchieste del commissario Maigret | Georges Simenon | Mario Landi | | |
| 27 February 1966 | Non si uccidono i poveri diavoli | | Mario Landi | | |
| 19 March 1968 | L'affondamento dell'Indianapolis | | Marco Leto | | |
| 26 July 1968 | Levati dai piedi, amore | | Massimo Scaglione | | |
| 7 September 1969 | Non te li puoi portare appresso | George S. Kaufman and Moss Hart | Mario Landi | | |
| 23 September 1969 | Il giardino dei ciliegi | Anton Chekhov | Mario Ferrero | | |
| 23 December 1969 | Ricordo la mamma | John Van Druten | Guglielmo Morandi | | |
| 20 March 1970 | Un costruttore | | Toni De Gregorio | | |
| 18 April 1970 | I giovedì della signora Giulia | | Paolo Nuzzi and Massimo Scaglione | | |
| 16 February 1973 | Dossier 321 | Pierre Boulle | Guglielmo Morandi | | |
| 3 August 1973 | Eva e la mela | Anton Čechov | Daniele D'Anza | Adaptation by Gabriel Arout | |
| 30 November 1973 | La visita della vecchia signora | Friedrich Dürrenmatt | Mario Landi | | |
| 8 March 1974 | Reperto numero sei | Jack Roffey | Guglielmo Morandi | | |
| 31 March 1974 | Il commissario De Vincenzi | | Mario Ferrero | Episode: L'albergo delle tre rose | < |
| 12 September 1974 | Il figlio di Gribuja | | Massimo Scaglione | Reprise of Teatro Carignano in Torino | |
| 17 January 1975 | L'onore di Hermann Sudermann | | Roberto Guicciardini | | |
| 4 April 1975 | Albert Einstein: Ritratto di scienziato | | Massimo Scaglione | | |
| 15 March 1976 | Rosso veneziano | | Marco Leto | From 14 February to 15 March 1976 | |
| 11 March 1976 | Il rigorista | | Luigi Perelli | | |
| 25 November 1977 | Capitan Veleno | | Enzo Tarquini | | |
| 13 January 1978 | La bella addormentata nel frigo | | Massimo Scaglione | Based on the works of Primo Levi | |
| 20 September 1979 | Antoine e Julie | | Mario Landi | | |

== Radio ==
| Date | Title | Writer | Director | Notes | Ref. |
|---|---|---|---|---|---|
| 16 March 1955 | Le convenienze teatrali | Antonio Simon Sografi | Pietro Masserano Taricco | | |
| 27 June 1955 | La famiglia Barrett | Rudolf Besier | Pietro Masserano Taricco | | |
| 22 June 1965 | San Juan | Max Aub | Pietro Masserano Taricco | | |
| 27 July 1965 | Il caporale di settimana | Paulo Fambri | Flaminio Bollini | | |
| 19 December 1965 | La Sévigné «aux Rochers» | Marcel Schneider | Marco Lami | | |
| 17 January 1966 | Collegio femminile | Charlotte Brontë | Ernesto Cortese | From 17 to 31 January 1966 | |
| 21 January 1966 | La collana | Guy de Maupassant | Ernesto Cortese | | |
| 30 April 1966 | Il mondo dietro l'angolo | Peter Bryant | Marco Visconti | | |
| 22 May 1966 | Glauco | Ercole Luigi Morselli | Pietro Masserano Taricco | | |
| 10 October 1966 | L'espiazione | Hermann Broch | Silverio Blasi | | |
| 4 November 1966 | L'ultimo romanzo | Sabatino Lopez | Massimo Scaglione | | |
| 11 April 1967 | Franta | Jan Rys | Ernesto Cortese | | |
| 25 April 1967 | Pensione Scilla | Giuseppe Cassieri | Domenico Giagni | | |
| 10 July 1967 | Un'eredità e la sua storia | Julien Mitchell | Giorgio Bandini | | |
| 24 July 1967 | Photo-finish | Peter Ustinov | Raffaele Meloni | | |
| 4 October 1967 | I provinciali | August von Kotzebue | Carlo Di Stefano | | |
| 9 October 1967 | Consuelo | George Sand | Marco Visconti | From 9 to 27 October 1967 | |
| 30 October 1967 | Amalasunta | Lao Pavoni | Giorgio Bandini | | |
| 1967 | Sherlock Holmes ritorna | | Guglielmo Morandi | | |
| 12 November 1967 | Lunga notte di Medea | | Giorgio Bandini | | |
| 20 November 1967 | Madamin | Gian Domenico Giagni and Virgilio Sabel | Gian Domenico Giagni | From 20 November to 15 December 1967 | |
| 5 December 1967 | Tutto un amore | Gian Francesco Luzi | Ernesto Cortese | | |
| 10 June 1968 | Una falsa pista | Anton Čechov | Ernesto Cortese | | |
| 17 September 1968 | La provinciale | Alberto Arbasino | Marco Lami | | |
| 20 October 1968 | Senza fatto | Simona Mastrocinque | di Giorgio Bandini | | |
| 17 December 1968 | Le due sorelle | Guy de Maupassant | Ernesto Cortese | | |
| 24 May 1969 | Le porte chiuse | José Fernando Dicenta | di Giorgio Bandini | | |
| 8 November 1969 | L'intervista | J. P. Donleavy | Massimo Scaglione | | |
| 18 March 1970 | La sfrontata | Carlo Bertolazzi | Filippo Crivelli | | |
| 9 May 1970 | L'illusione | Federico De Roberto | Carlo Di Stefano | From 9 May to 13 June 1970 | |
| 21 October 1970 | La figlia della portinaia | Carolina Invernizio | Vilda Ciurlo | From 21 October to 6 November 1970 | |
| 21 April 1971 | Fermate il tempo, per favore | Tom Stoppard | Massimo Scaglione | | |
| 6 December 1972 | Poi... ci sarà anche Oreste | Pino Puggioni | Massimo Scaglione | | |
| 28 March 1973 | La ragazza di Tarquinia | Marcello Sartarelli | Marcello Sartarelli | | |
| 4 May 1974 | Cosma perduto | Mario Bagnara | Massimo Scaglione | | |
| 10 June 1974 | Mogli e figlie | Elizabeth Gaskell | Carlo Di Stefano | From 10 to 28 June 1974 | |
| 22 July 1974 | Capitan Fracassa | Théophile Gautier | Guglielmo Morandi | From 22 July to 9 August 1974 | |
| 11 October 1974 | Dialogo della contestazione | Carlo Monterosso | Carlo Quartucci | | |
| 29 October 1974 | Incontro nell'isola | Françoise Xenakis | Marco Parodi | | |
| 8 August 1975 | O scena oscena! | Lamberto Pignotti | Tonino Del Colle | | |
| 17 March 1976 | Il caso Simone Mercier | Eva Franchi | Massimo Scaglione | | |
| 2 July 1977 | Il più forte | Giuseppe Giacosa | Ernesto Cortese | | |

== Theatre ==
| Date | Title | Writer | Director | Theatre |
|---|---|---|---|---|
| 13 October 1945 | Moulin Rouge | Erminio Macario and Mario Amendola | | Teatro Lirico, Milano |
| 1948 | Allegro | Marcello Marchesi | | |
| 3 November 1949 | Caldo e freddo | Fernand Crommelynck | Lucio Chiavarelli | Teatro Valle di Roma |
| 31 July 1950 | Giustizia | Ladislao Fodor | | Teatro Odeon di Milano |
| 7 August 1950 | Liberaci dal male | Guglielmo Giannini | | Teatro Odeon di Milano |
| 11 September 1950 | L'uomo della luce | Ezio D'Errico | | Teatro Olimpia di Milano |
| 1951 | La tavola rotonda | Alberto Vario | | |
| 18 September 1951 | Invito al castello | Jean Anouilh | Lucio Chiavarelli | Teatro Manzoni di Milano |
| 12 March 1952 | Sogno di un Walter | Silva & Terzoli | | Teatro Sistina di Roma |
| 15 December 1954 | La lettera di mammà | Peppino De Filippo | Peppino De Filippo | Teatro delle Arti di Roma |
| 7 December 1955 | Processo a Gesù | Diego Fabbri | Orazio Costa | Teatro Olimpia di Milano |
| 20 December 1956 | Adorabile Giulia | Marc-Gilbert Sauvajon | Daniele D'Anza | Teatro Eliseo di Roma |
| 19 January 1957 | Ma non è una cosa seria | Luigi Pirandello | Luigi Squarzina | Teatro Eliseo di Roma |
| 18 March 1957 | Signori buonasera | Arnoldo Foà | Arnoldo Foà | Teatro Odeon di Milano |
| 26 June 1957 | Le donne al parlamento | Aristophanes | Luigi Squarzina | Teatro Romano di Benevento |
| 11 December 1957 | Patata | Marcel Achard | Gino Cervi | Teatro Nuovo di Milano |
| 18 January 1958 | La gatta sul tetto che scotta | Tennessee Williams | Raymond Rouleau | Teatro Manzoni di Milano |
| 24 March 1958 | Serata di gala | Federico Zardi | Luigi Squarzina | Teatro Eliseo di Roma |
| 5 December 1958 | La pappa reale | Félicien Marceau | Luciano Salce | Teatro Manzoni di Milano |
| 22 April 1959 | Veronica e gli ospiti | Giuseppe Marotta and Belisario Randone | Luciano Salce | Teatro Quirino di Roma |
| 25 December 1959 | Il valzer del toreador | Jean Anouilh | Sandro Bolchi | Politeama Genovese |
| 18 March 1960 | La morte civile | Paolo Giacometti | Renzo Ricci | Teatro Nuovo di Milano |
| 18 February 1961 | Alibi al cianuro | Guglielmo Giannini | Franca Dominici | Teatro delle Muse di Roma |
| 3 November 1961 | Il giardino dei ciliegi | Anton Čechov | Mario Ferrero | Teatro Eliseo di Roma |
| 16 December 1961 | Quaderno proibito | Alba de Céspedes | Mario Ferrero | Teatro Eliseo di Roma |
| 21 December 1962 | I Masteroidi | Marcel Aymé | Arnoldo Foà | Teatro Quirino di Roma |
| 19 February 1963 | Notti a Milano | Carlo Terron | Arnoldo Foà | Teatro Odeon di Milano |
| 6 February 1964 | Il male del gelato | Mario Landi | Mario Maranzana | RomaTeatro delle Muse |
| 20 April 1964 | Delitti per un'ombra | Frédéric Valmain | Lucio Chiavarelli | Ridotto delTeatro Eliseo |
| 2 May 1964 | Processo a porte chiuse | Elisa Pezzari | Carlo Nistri | Ridotto delTeatro Eliseo |
| 18 July 1964 | I Menecmi | Plauto | Giulio Platone | Ridotto del Teatro Eliseo |
| 28 December 1965 | La veggente | André Roussin | Carlo Di Stefano | Teatro del Convegno di Milano |
| 11 June 1966 | La notte dei cristalli | Berto Perotti | Gualtiero Rizzi | Teatro Gobetti di Torino |
| 29 May 1968 | Elettra | Euripide | Davide Montemurri | Teatro Greco by Siracusa |
| 29 October 1968 | Aspettando Jo | Alec Coppel and Claude Magnier | Silverio Blasi | Teatro Nuovo di Milano |
| October 1970 | Otto mele per Eva | Gabriel Arout | Daniele D'Anza | Bari |
| 4 January 1972 | Lascio alle mie donne | Diego Fabbri | Daniele D'Anza | Teatro Quirino di Roma |
| 1 June 1972 | Medea | Euripide | Franco Enriquez | Teatro Greco di Siracusa |
| 14 November 1978 | La bugiarda | Diego Fabbri | Giancarlo Cobelli | Teatro Quirino di Roma |
