= Malabimba – The Malicious Whore =

1979 Italian sexploitation horror film

- Directed by: Andrea Bianchi
- Screenplay by: Piero Regnoli
- Produced by: Gabriele Crisanti
- Starring: Katell Laennec; Patrizia Webley; Enzo Fisichella; Giuseppe Marrocco
- Cinematography: Franco Villa
- Music by: Elsio Mancuso; Berto Pisano
- Production company: Filmarte
- Distributed by: Stefano Film
- Release date: 22 September 1979 (Italy)
- Country: Italy

Malabimba – The Malicious Whore (Italian: Malabimba "wicked child") is a 1979 Italian sexploitation horror film directed by Andrea Bianchi.

== Plot ==
In the castle of a wealthy family, a seance is held to contact the spirit of a woman who had been murdered. Instead, the spirit of Lucrezia, an ancestor of the family, is recalled during the seance. Lucrezia tries to take possession of the soul of Sister Sofia, who has lived in the castle to take care of the paralytic Adolfo, owner of the castle together with his brother Andrea, the husband of the murdered woman. Not succeeding, she takes possession instead of the body of the adolescent Bimba: she is the daughter of Andrea and the murdered woman, and until then had spent a very withdrawn and reserved life.

In the following days the behavior of Bimba radically changes, due to the evil influence of Lucrezia's soul, and several times, she falls prey of the perverse sexual urges of Lucrezia, while unconsciously sheds light on the sexual and perverse vices of her family members. The family members, worried, entrust the girl to the care of Sister Sofia. The relationship between Bimba and Sister Sofia grows more confidential and between them a loving friendship is born. But in reality Bimba, subjugated by the soul of Lucrezia, sexually tempts the nun into a downward spiral of unspeakable debauchery.

== Cast ==
- Katell Laennec as Bimba Caroli
- Patrizia Webley as Nais
- Enzo Fisichella as Andrea Caroli
- Giuseppe Marrocco as Adolfo Caroli (as Giuseppe Marrocu)
- Elisa Mainardi as Medium
- Giancarlo Del Duca as Giorgio
- Pupita Lea Scuderoni as Bimba's Grandmother (as Pupita Lea)
- Mariangela Giordano as Sister Sofia (as Maria Angela Giordan)

== Style ==
Brizio-Skov stated that films such as Malabimba - The Malicious Whore were inspired by The Exorcist but also stood in the tradition of Italian gothic films, in that they depicted sexually active women as being deadly and dangerous. Italian film historian Roberto Curti noted the film's emphasis on eroticism, stating that by 1979, gothic films were infused with erotic themes that generally took over the narrative.

== Production ==
The script for Malabimba - The Malicious Whore written by Piero Regnoli, whose screenplays of the 1970s often surrounded by eroticism. It was shot at Castle Piccolomini in Balsorano. Mariangela Giordano recalled that the film was shot in March 1979 for twelve days, working "day and night through the weekends" She stated she had gotten ill on set but as the producer, and her current romantic partner Gabriele Crisanti had not taken insurance policies on the production, she did not go to the hospital until the film was finished. On reflecting on her work with the producer in Malabimba, Giallo a Venezia and Patrick Still Lives, she commented that she "shouldn't have done them. But I was in love with Gabriele, I would have done anything for him."

== Release ==
The initial version submitted to the Italian Board of Censors had a running time of 84 minutes and 45 seconds, while a longer version of the film was actually distributed with explicit sex inserts. Franco Villa denied having shot hardcore footage for the film, stating the footage shown theatrically was not his footage. Curti noted that there are no stand-in for the scenes where Laennec perform fellatio to the Uncle Adolfo character. Malabimba – The Malicious Whore was distributed theatrically in Italy on 22 September 1979 by Stefano Film.

Roberto Curti stated that the producer of Malabimba would "basically remake" the film as another horror and hardcore pornography hybrid titled La bimba di Satana which was released 1983.

== Reception ==
In a retrospective review, Jason Buchanan (AllMovie) described the film as "a Euro-sleaze classic of the highest caliber" Danny Shipka, author of book on European exploitation films described the film as both fun and shocking, noting that the film mixes both softcore and hardcore inserts. Shipka concluded the film to have several laughable spots and was best viewed with a group of both "discriminating (and not-so-discrimingating) friends".
