= Nude per l'assassino =

- Italian poster
- Directed by: Andrea Bianchi
- Screenplay by: Massimo Felisatti
- Story by: Andrea Bianchi
- Starring: Solvi Stubing; Nino Castelnuovo; Edwige Fenech; Erna Schürer
- Cinematography: Franco Delli Colli
- Edited by: Francesco Bertuccioli; Claudio Cumo
- Music by: Berto Pisano
- Production company: Fral Cinematografica
- Release date: August 26, 1975 (Italy)
- Running time: 98 minutes
- Country: Italy
- Language: Italian

Nude per l'assassino (English: Strip Nude for Your Killer) is a 1975 giallo film directed by Andrea Bianchi. Written by Massimo Felisatti, the film stars Nino Castelnuovo, Edwige Fenech and Solvi Stubing, and features music by Berto Pisano. Nude per l'assassino has received mixed reviews from critics.

After a model dies while undergoing an illegal abortion, a killer disguised in a motorcycle helmet tracks down and kills the doctor involved. Several models and photographers working at the same agency as the dead girl are also murdered, leading two surviving photographers to fear for their lives as they try to track down the killer.

Nude per l'assassino is one of several collaborations between Bianchi, Felisatti and cinematographer Franco Delli Colli. The film has been described as a formulaic giallo thriller, and has been cited as an influence on the development of the American slasher film genre.

== Plot ==
After a fashion model dies while undergoing an illegal abortion, the attending doctor moves her body back to her home, staging her death to remove any trace of his involvement. However, that same night he is murdered by a stranger disguised in racing leathers and a motorcycle helmet. At the Albatross Modelling Agency, the womanizing photographer Carlo embarks on an affair with fellow photographer Magda.

Meanwhile, a newly hired model, Patrizia, fends off the unwanted advances of Maurizio, whose wife owns the agency. One evening, Mario, who also works at the agency, invites a guest in racing leathers into his home for a drink, and is stabbed to death. The police question the agency's owner Gisella and another model, Lucia about the killing, but learn very little. Gisella makes Lucia exchange in sex with her to keep her job; one night when Gisella leaves after a fight, Lucia is attacked and killed.

Maurizio propositions another model, Doris, but when she refuses to sleep with him for money, he attempts to rape her. However, he suffers from impotence and Doris leaves unharmed. Shortly afterwards, Maurizio is stabbed by the killer. Carlo later witnesses Gisella being murdered, and is able to photograph the attack; however, he runs off and is injured in a hit and run accident. While he is in hospital, Magda recovers his camera and attempts to develop the film, but the killer breaks in and destroys the negatives. Carlo hurries home, but the killer has gone—going instead to kill Doris and her abusive boyfriend Stefano.

Carlo finds Magda alive, but the killer returns to attack them both. During the struggle, the killer is knocked down a flight of stairs. The killer is unmasked and revealed to be Patrizia, who accuses Carlo of causing the death of her sister—the girl who died in the botched abortion, and whose death it is revealed Carlo helped to conceal. However, Patrizia dies of her injuries, leaving no trace of Carlo's involvement.

== Cast ==
- Edwige Fenech as Magda Cortis
- Nino Castelnuovo as Carlo Gunther
- Femi Benussi as Lucia Cerezer
- Solvi Stubing as Patrizia
- Lia Amanda as Gisella Mayer (credited as Amanda)
- Franco Diogene as Maurizio Pozzani
- Lucio Como as Commissioner
- Erna Schürer as Doris
- Gianni Airò as Dr. Giulio De Castelli
- Silvana Depreto as Carlo's Lover
- Achille Grioni as Lawyer
- Giuseppa Meschella as Eveline
- Filippo La Neve as Doctor
- Wainer Verri as Stefano
- Rodolfo Zola

== Production ==
Writer Massimo Felisatti did not wish to be seen as having solely written the film, and gave director Andrea Bianchi credit for the story in order to "deflect his role and not have to bear full responsibility" for the script. Bianchi, Felisatti and cinematographer Franco Delli Colli would collaborate again the following year in La moglie di mio padre. Nude per l'assassino's score was written by Berto Pisano, who would also go on to write the score for Bianchi's 1979 film Malabimba – The Malicious Whore. Bianchi would later cast Femi Benussi, who portrayed one of the slain models, in two other films—La moglie di mio padre and Cara dolce nipote.

Nude per l'assassino has been described as following "the giallo formula almost to the letter", demonstrating that "the giallo conventions established by Bava and Argento and elaborated upon by a number of directors in the early 1970s had become well codified" by the time the film was produced. The film has also been cited as being "the perfect bridge to the American slasher film", with its emphasis on "violence and sex" and a plot "dumbed down to the barest minimum".

== Release ==
Nude per l'assassino was released on 26 August 1975. Upon release in the United Kingdom on October 4, 1979, it was rated X by the British Board of Film Classification, following the removal of five minutes of material from the film. It has subsequently received home media releases in English by Blue Underground as Strip Nude for Your Killer, first on DVD on October 25, 2005, and on Blu-ray Disc on March 27, 2012. Shameless Screen Entertainment also released a DVD version under the title Strip Nude for Your Killer on October 27, 2008. The film has also been distributed under the titles Tenebre braccia della morte and Strip Naked for Your Killer.

== Reception ==
Nude per l'assassino has been met with mixed reviews. Martyn Auty of the Monthly Film Bulletin, stated that "For all its clichéd direction (voyeuristic threateningly subjective camerawork) and perfunctory sexual diversions, this routine sex-ploiter is at least tolerably shot and unfussily plotted." Writing for AllMovie, Jason Buchanan rated the film two stars out of five, calling it "unabashedly sadistic". Budd Wilkins, writing for Slant magazine, rated the film three stars out of five, calling it "one of the more sordid examples" of the giallo genre. Wilkins noted that the film's violence "isn't necessarily stronger than in contemporary giallo films like Argento's Deep Red", but that it is "more resolutely tied to aberrant sexuality than almost anywhere else in the genre". Wilkins also compared the film's central premise—that of revenge for a failed abortion—to that of Massimo Dallamano's 1972 film What Have You Done to Solange?. DVD Talk's Adam Tyner also gave the film two stars out of five, summarising it as "not much of a movie". Tyner noted that Nude per l'assassino "doesn't set out to be revered as an artistic triumph", and described it as "worth at least a rental" for fans of the genre.

Writing for The A.V. Club, Noel Murray compared the film to Sergio Martino's 1972 film Your Vice Is a Locked Room and Only I Have the Key (Il tuo vizio è una stanza chiusa e solo io ne ho la chiave), noting that "both take place among the idle European aristocracy, with vapid models, rugged motocross drivers, bigoted executives, and debauched artists wandering through a world of soft fabrics and bloody, gashed skin". Bloody Disgusting's Mike Pereira rated Nude per l'assassino 0.5 out of 5, writing that it "reeks of amateur hour". Pereira felt that the film featured "dead-on-arrival pacing" and "terrible filmmaking and acting A staff review for the Italian magazine Nocturno rated the film four out of five, describing it as "one of the most daring" giallo films of the 1970s. (Note: Original text—"Non il più bello, ma sicuramente uno dei più spinti gialli all'italiana degli anni Settanta".) Previewing the film's Blu-ray release, IGN's David McCutcheon described Nude per l'assassino as an "infamous shocker that packs more grisly violence and sexual depravity into each frame than just about any other film".
