= Campagnola bella =

1975 film

- Directed by: Mario Siciliano
- Screenplay by: Mario Siciliano; Piero Regnoli
- Starring: Franca Gonella; Femi Benussi
- Cinematography: Gino Santini
- Edited by: Otello Colangeli
- Music by: Carlo Savina
- Release date: 1976
- Country: Italy
- Language: Italian

Campagnola bella (lit. 'Beautiful country girl') is a 1976 commedia sexy all'italiana film directed by Mario Siciliano and starring Franca Gonella and Femi Benussi.

== Cast ==
- Franca Gonella as Letizia
- Femi Benussi as Felicetta
- Gianni Dei as Lt. Marco Giovanpietro
- Filippo Torriero as Captain Napoleone Primo
- Ezio Marano as Baron
- Carla Calò as Donna Francesca
- Riccardo Garrone as Rodolfo
- Magda Konopka as Tata
- Aldo Alori as Cirillo Palazzucci
- Paola Corazzi as Veterinarian's wife
- Enzo Andronico as Giuseppe

== Production ==
The film was produced by Metheus Film.

== Release ==
The film was distributed in Italian cinemas by C.I.A. starting from 27 February 1976.

== Reception ==
The film grossed 119 million lire. A contemporary review from Il Secolo XIX described the film as "lost in a mire of crude stupidity and vulgarity, drawing its only vaguely sensible ideas from an old set of clichés."
