= The Eye of the Needle (film) =

- Directed by: Marcello Andrei
- Written by: Marcello Andrei; Leonardo Sciascia
- Produced by: Aldo Calamara; Otello Cocchi Achille; Filo Della Torre
- Starring: Gérard Blain; Nino Castelnuovo; Annette Stroyberg
- Cinematography: Riccardo Pallottini
- Edited by: Renato Cinquini
- Music by: Carlo Rustichelli
- Production company: Les Films Agiman
- Distributed by: Warner Bros.
- Release date: February 20, 1963
- Running time: 97 minutes
- Country: Italy
- Language: Italian

The Eye of the Needle (Italian: La smania addosso) is a 1963 Italian comedy-drama film directed by Marcello Andrei.

== Cast ==
- Gérard Blain: Totò
- Annette Stroyberg: Rosaria Trizzini
- Nino Castelnuovo: Nicola Badalà
- Mariangela Giordano: Carmelina
- Vittorio Gassman: Lawyer Mazzarò
- Gino Cervi: Lawyer d'Angelo
- Lando Buzzanca: carabiniere Sanfilippo
- Ernesto Calindri: Don Salvatore
- Umberto Spadaro: Don Luigino Trizzini
- Leopoldo Trieste: Don Calogero
- Ignazio Balsamo: Don Nenè
- Carla Calò: Gna' Santa
- Attilio Dottesio: Judge
