= Batton Story =

1976 film by Mario Landi

- Directed by: Mario Landi
- Written by: Piero Regnoli
- Produced by: Gabriele Crisanti
- Starring: Femi Benussi
- Cinematography: Franco Villa
- Music by: Willy Brezza
- Release date: 1976
- Country: Italy
- Language: Italian

Batton Story (Italian: Le impiegate stradali, literally The road employees) is a 1976 commedia sexy all'italiana directed by Mario Landi.

== Synopsis ==
A Roman teacher takes the side of a group of prostitutes and sets up a trade union to support their rights.

== Cast ==
- Femi Benussi as Marisa Colli
- Marisa Merlini as Zaira
- Daniela Giordano as Pucci
- Gianni Dei as Stefano
- Toni Ucci as Carlo
- Gianni Cajafa as Arturo
- Mariangela Giordano as Priscilla

== See also ==
- List of Italian films of 1976
