= Albert Verrecchia =

- Born: France
- Genres: Film score
- Occupation(s): Composer, musician, keyboardist
- Instruments: Keyboards

Albert Verrecchia (a.k.a. Albert Weyman and Albert Prince) is a French-born keyboard player, composer and record producer, long time resident of, and working in, Italy.

== Life and career ==
=== The beginnings: Evy and "I Pyranas" ===
Born in Paris and raised in an italian family of musicians, Albert Verrecchia started very young with his sister Evy (Évelyne) who was already recording. He got a band together for her in Paris, Les Problèmes and then joined Vigon et les Lemons, a R&B ensemble with an awesome horn section, that eventually became Evy's backing group.

Then Evy had them all move to Italy, where she got some popularity with the single "L'Abito Non Fa il Beatnik" (1966) – an Italian cover of Jackie Edwards' and Spencer Davis Group's 1965 UK number one hit, "Keep on Running" – and they started playing live in most of night clubs, both in Italy and in France as well as in North Africa, especially at the 'Titan Club' in Rome and at 'Bus Palladium' in Paris.

As The Lemons, furthermore, Evy's backing group featuring Albert backed Chuck Berry in his French concerts and got credits on Evy's third Italian single "Domani il Mondo Sarà nelle Nostre Mani". In that period Verrecchia also toured with Raffaella Carrà.

Later, in Rome, popular black jazz singer Rocky Roberts who had just split with The Airdales to go solo, chose the best musicians he could find in Paris to back him up, and one of the most influential Italian beat bands was born, "I Pyranas". Verrecchia played the Würlitzer Piano and a Hammond M3 with incorporated Leslie, while Alex Ligertwood was on vocals and André Ceccarelli on drums,. Later Robbie McIntosh (former drummer of Average White Band who later worked a lot with Santana) and Steve Ferrone also played in the group. Left Rocky Roberts, I Pyranas continued solo for several years with three successful albums released on RCA's ARC subsidiary label - Tanti Successi per i Pyranas (1968), Motivi di Ieri, Successi di Oggi (1969), Giulietta e Romeo (1970).

When they disbanded, Verrecchia began with a series of collaborations with many then up-and-coming artists, among these Alan Sorrenti – Verrecchia produced his debut album Aria (1972) contributing also as keyboardist and arranger using the alias Albert Prince - and Renato Zero. Verrecchia played keyboards and did arrangements on his first album, No! Mamma, no! (1972) - before mostly dedicating himself to write and direct film soundtracks in the following years.

=== Film soundtracks ===
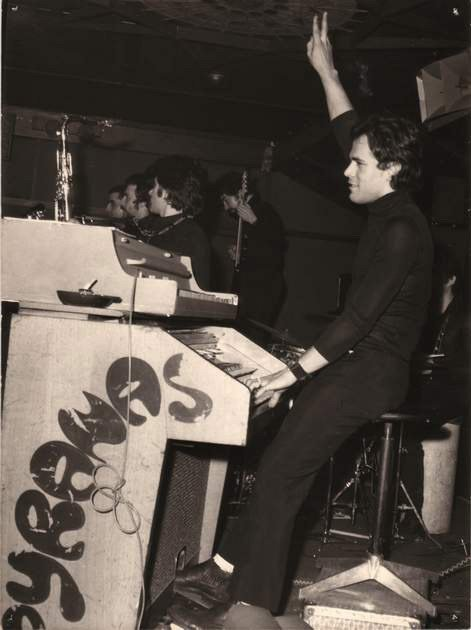
Albert Verrecchia with Pyranas in late 1960s

In film soundtracks Verrecchia delivered what are regarded as his most interesting works to date, with Tecnica di un Amore (1973), which he composed for a still rather obscure Italian erotic drama directed by Brunello Rondi and starring Janet Ågren alongside Erna Schurer and Silvano Tranquilli, standing as his most praised outcome. Tecnica di un amore got a first vinyl release in 1973 by the Naples B.B.B. Records' label and was later reprinted on LP and CD in 2000 by Moving Image Entertainment.

Another Verrecchia highlight is the recently rediscovered Roma Drogata: La Polizia Non Può Intervenire (also known as Hallucination Strip), from a 1975 drugs-themed movie starring Bud Cort, Patrizia Gori, Annarita Grapputo, and directed by Lucio Marcaccini. It received a public release in 2007 (on the Cinedelic GDM label CD, thanks to Associazione Culturale Escalation's interest), Verrecchia made use of electric sounds instead of canonical orchestral arrangements, mixing soul, hard rock, blues style, experimental vocals and percussions, with heavy psychedelic influences.

For the instrumental part, Verrecchia recruited a group of young players: Cyan – an italo-English quartet formed by George Sims (guitars), Roger Smith (bass), Alberto Visentin (keyboards) e Franco Di Stefano (drums) derived from a former Patty Pravo backing band – the Baba Yaga – a female vocal trio who worked for RCA and had already backed singer-songwriters such as De Gregori (in Alice Non Lo Sa, 1973) and Dalla (in Anidride Solforosa, 1975) singing as well in a few soundtracks by Guido & Maurizio De Angelis such as Watch Out, We're Mad! (1974), in the track "Dune Buggy").

Roma Drogata: La Polizia Non Può Intervenire, both film and record, open with "We've Got a Lord", a soul ballad interpreted by Sammy Barbot featuring Baba Yaga. It was written by Évelyne who credited herself from this period on as Évelyne Lenton. The film opened showing the actual recording sessions of "We've Got a Lord". Other Verrecchia scores include: A Black Ribbon for Deborah (Marcello Andrei, 1974), Prigione di Donne (Brunello Rondi, 1974) and Season for Assassins (Marcello Andrei, 1975).

=== Disco era ===
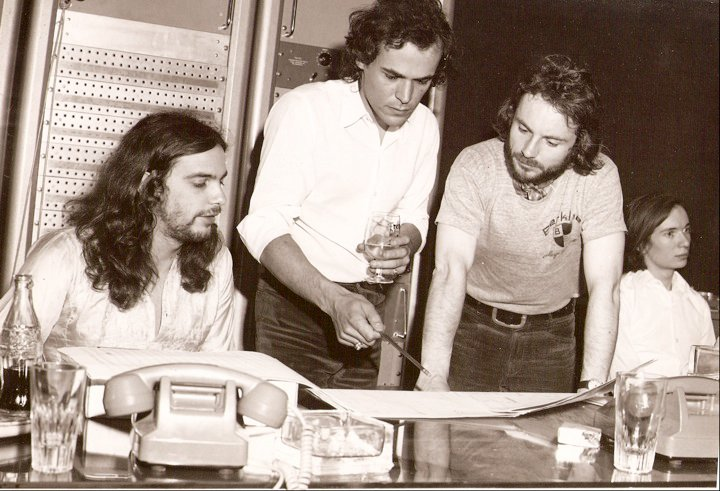
Early 1970s studio session with Albert Verrecchia (center), Alan Sorrenti (left) and Jean-Luc Ponty (right).

In 1976, Verrecchia turned his music interests toward the emerging disco euroscene and started his own record productions under the pseudonym Albert Weyman releasing the single "Le Chat (La Chatte à la Voisine)", banned on Italian radio, but regularly programmed on Vatican State Radio until they had the lyrics double meaning translated. What followed in Verrecchia's mind was the idea of a glittering disco trio led by Evy, who with two black chorists, Marcia Briscoe from Atlanta and Jusy Fortes from Cape Verde, formed Belle Epoque.

Their first success was with Miss Broadway which Verrecchia wrote, but the real exploit came in 1977, when the trio score a major European hit with a disco-fied remake of a big success of the decade before, "Black Is Black" by Los Bravos. The Belle Epoque version was a top ten hit in many European countries, including number 2 in the UK Singles Chart (the same chart position that Los Bravos' original had reached there eleven years earlier). The song also became a number 1 hit in Australia in 1978, while in the States Belle Epoque were better known for "Miss Broadway", which charted at number 26 on the U.S. R&B chart and at number 92 on the Billboard Hot 100 in 1978. Both songs rose to number 21 on Billboard's "National Disco Action Top 40" chart in summer 1977.

After "Black is Black" Verrecchia and Belle Epoque followed with a number disco successful productions into the late 1970s, "Bamalama" (1978), "Let Men Be" (1978), "Com'On Tonight" (1978), "Now" (1979), "Jump Down" (1979), and a dance version of Bobby Solo's "Una Lacrima sul Viso" (1978).

At the principle of 1980s the disco boom was over, and after so many years of intense work Verrecchia decided to take a pause, reducing his musical activity. While Evy began recording solo again in 1982, contributing with her vocals both in English and French productions until the end of the decade, her brother bought a boat, the 'Silver Maid', Scottish, all in teak, which had been Susan Stafford's - where he managed to enter a grand piano! - and opened an exclusive disco club, the "Superstar", in Nice, French Riviera.

=== Recent activity ===
In 2011, Verrecchia is dedicating to music again (and again under the moniker Albert Weyman), forging a modern, updated style, which he describes as a blend of electronica, new-age, house and progressive.

== Soundtrack discography ==
1973 - Tecnica di un Amore

- Taken from the 1973 movie directed by Brunello Rondi.
- Original 1973 release on LP [BCLB 0003] and 7 inches [BSB 0007] on B.B.B. Records Naples Italy label . 2000 LP and CD reprint on Moving Image Entertainment Italy label [MIE 005].

1974 - Un Fiocco Nero per Deborah (a.k.a. A Black Ribbon for Deborah)

- Taken from the 1974 movie directed by Marcello Andrei.
- 1974 7 inches release on Kansas Italy label [KANSAS 5100 402].

1974 - Prigione di Donne

- Taken from the 1974 movie directed by Brunello Rondi.
- 2011 CD release on Beat Records Company Italy label [DDJ009] in 2011. Limited edition 500 copies.

1975 - Roma Drogata: La Polizia Non Può Intervenire (a.k.a. Il Buio nel Cervello / Allucinating Trip / Hallucination Strip)

- Taken from the 1975 movie directed by Lucio Marcaccini.
- 2007 CD release on Cinedelic GDM Music Italy label [GDM 4011]. Limited edition 500 copies.

1975 - Il Tempo degli Assassini (a.k.a. Season for Assassins)

- Taken from the 1975 movie directed by Marcello Andrei.
- 1975 7 inches release on CAM Italy label [CAM AMP 165]. Instrumental versions of both the tracks "Gang Leader" (Performed by 'The Killers') and "Season of Assassins" (Performed by 'Sammy Barbot') are included in Verrecchia's 1977 library Album "RITMICO MODERNO" [CAM CML 131].
