= The Last Round (1976 film) =

- Directed by: Stelvio Massi
- Written by: Piero Regnoli
- Cinematography: Franco Delli Colli
- Music by: Luis Bacalov
- Release date: 1976
- Language: Italian

The Last Round (Italian: Il conto è chiuso) is a 1976 Italian crime film directed by Stelvio Massi.

== Cast ==
- Carlos Monzón: Marco Russo
- Luc Merenda: Rico Manzetti
- Leonora Fani: Nina
- Mariangela Giordano: Lisa's Mother
- Gianni Dei: Beny Manzetti
- Giampiero Albertini: Sapienza
- Susana Giménez: Maristella
- Luisa Maneri (credited as Annaluisa Pesce): Lisa
- Mario Brega: Bobo Belmondo
- Nello Pazzafini: Henchman of Rico

== See also ==
- List of Italian films of 1976
