= La bolognese =

1975 film

- Directed by: Alfredo Rizzo
- Screenplay by: Piero Regnoli
- Starring: Franca Gonella; Luciano Pigozzi
- Cinematography: Aldo Greci
- Edited by: Piera Bruni; Gianfranco Simoncelli
- Music by: Carlo Savina
- Release date: 1975
- Country: Italy
- Language: Italian

La bolognese ('The Girl from Bologna') is a 1975 commedia sexy all'italiana film directed by Alfredo Rizzo and starring Franca Gonella.

== Cast ==
- Franca Gonella as Caterina Moreno
- Luciano Pigozzi as Secondo Moreno
- Roberto Loreti as Tonino
- Ria De Simone as Rosetta
- Guido Leontini as Pietro
- Cinzia Romanazzi as Susanna Moreno
- Paolo Pacino as Marco
- Olga Romanelli as Norma
- Renato Malavasi as Primo Moreno
- Luca Sportelli as Oscarino
- Enzo Pulcrano as Photographer
- Attilio Dottesio as Don Calogero
- Dada Gallotti

== Production ==
The film was produced by Romi Cinematografica. It was shot between Milan, Monte Gelato and other locations in the Lazio region.

== Release ==
The film was distributed in Italian cinemas in late 1975, but almost immediately all copies were seized on the order of a prosecutor, and in June 1976 the Court of Latina sentenced director, cast and producers for obscenity. After a successful appeal, the film was re-released in May 1977.

== Reception ==
A contemporary review on Il Giorno described the film as "useless more than mediocre", with the director "almost never managing even a hint of a smile when attempting humor, or the faintest trace of emotion when shifting to eroticism."
