= Franca Gonella =

Italian actress (born 1952)

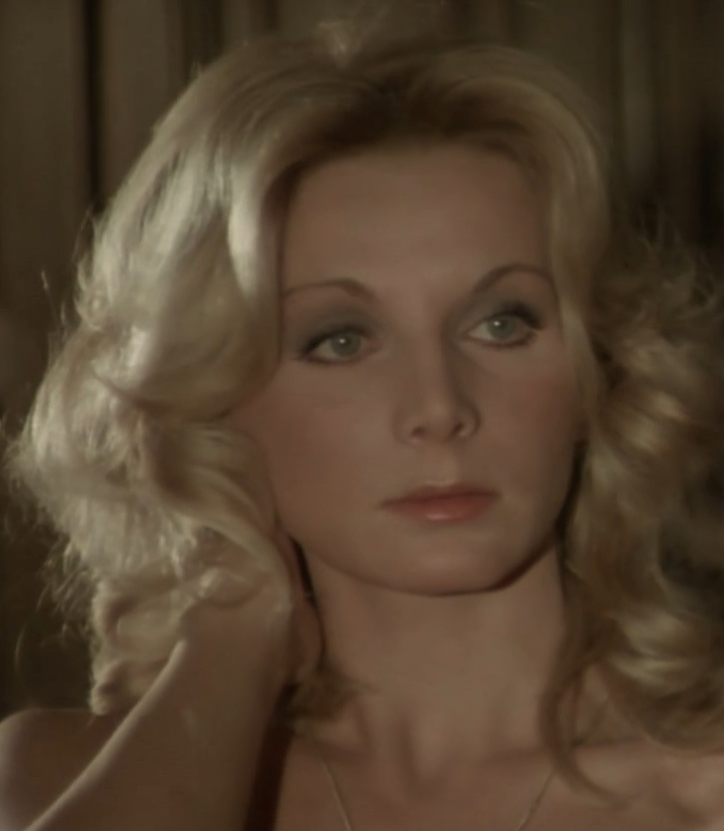
- Gonella in Sex, Demons and Death (1975)
- Born: 1 March 1952 (age 73); Turin, Italy
- Occupation: Actress

Franca Gonella (born 1 March 1952) is an Italian film, stage and television actress, mostly active between 1970s and mid-1980s.

== Life and career ==
Born in Turin, Gonella studied modern literature and history of theater and cinema at the University of Turin. She started her career on stage, and during a tour in Sicily, through the actor Pino Ferrara, she met the director Mariano Laurenti, who cast her in the film Cerca di capirmi. In a few years, she became a star in low-budget productions the Commedia sexy all'italiana sub-genre. In the 1980s, she was cast in major film and television productions, collaborating with Maurizio Scaparro, Aldo Lado and Pierre Kast, among others. She also often collaborated with the indie director and producer Amasi Damiani.

== Selected filmography ==
- Aretino's Stories of the Three Lustful Daughters (1972)
- Aretino's Blue Stories (1972)
- Revelations of a Psychiatrist on the World of Sexual Perversion (1973)
- Sex, Demons and Death (1975)
- The Three Superboys Strike Again (1975)
- La bolognese (1975)
- A Virgin in the Family (1975)
- Campagnola bella (1976)
- Terror in Rome (1976)
- Orazi e Curiazi 3 - 2 (1977)
- Cugine mie (1978)
- Missione eroica - I pompieri 2 (1987)
- Il notturno di Chopin (2012)
