= La principessa sul pisello =

- Directed by: Piero Regnoli
- Screenplay by: Piero Regnoli
- Story by: Piero Regnoli
- Produced by: Enzo Boetani; Giuseppe Collura
- Cinematography: Fausto Zuccoli
- Edited by: Adriano Tagliavia
- Music by: Nico Fidenco
- Production company: Samy Cinematografica
- Release date: August 1976 (Italy)
- Running time: 95 minutes
- Country: Italy

La principessa sul pisello is a 1976 Italian film directed by Piero Regnoli.

== Production ==
According to the wife of director Piero Regnoli, Silvia Innocenzi, the original idea for La principessa sul pisello came from the director's friend Alfredo Rizzo. Rizzo's idea was reportedly to follow up the success of adult oriented fairytale comics, similar to American productions such as The Erotic Adventures of Pinocchio (1971). La principessa sul pisello was shot in 1973.

== Release ==
La principessa sul pisello was submitted to the Italian Board of Censors in April 1974 and was eventually released in August 1976 with minimal distribution.

== Reception ==
In a contemporary review, Roberto Curti wrote in his book about Italian films influenced by comics that La principessa sul pisello that despite having a good premise, the Regnoli "does little to develop it". Curti critiqued the humor in the film saying that sight gags ranged from "silly to awful" and that the direction was flat.

== See also ==
- List of Italian films of 1976
