= Cugine mie =

1975 film

- Directed by: Marcello Avallone
- Screenplay by: Roberto Gianviti
- Starring: Ely Galleani; Franca Gonella; Christiana Borghi
- Cinematography: Luciano Trasatti
- Edited by: Ornella Micheli
- Music by: Nico Fidenco
- Release date: 1978
- Country: Italy
- Language: Italian

Cugine mie (lit. 'Cousins of mine') is a 1978 commedia sexy all'italiana film directed by Marcello Avallone and starring Ely Galleani, Franca Gonella, and Christiana Borghi.

== Cast ==
- Ely Galleani as Irene Colarossi
- Franca Gonella as Mara Colarossi
- Christiana Borghi as Silvia Colarossi
- Susan Scott as Gaia Bordignon
- Carletto Sposito as Professor Federico Bordignon
- Paola Maiolini as Antonietta
- Carlo Marini as cugino Anselmo
- Renato Pinciroli as Ottavio Bordignon
- Francesco Pau as Carletto
- Fabrizio Cardinali as Giulio
- Franco Spinazzola as Tonino

== Production ==
Principal photography started in 1976. The film was produced by Costellation Film. It was shot between Padua and the Incir - De Paolis studios in Rome.

== Release ==
The film was distributed in Italian cinemas by Lark starting from 28 August 1978.

== Reception ==
The film grossed 143 million lire. Giovanna Grassi from Corriere della Sera praised it, describing it as "a lighthearted film, well-crafted in its setting, with a boisterous satirical tone and occasional risqué humor."
