= Songs in the Streets =

1950 film

- Directed by: Mario Landi
- Written by: Alfredo Bracchi; Carlo Alberto Chiesa; Dino Falconi; Mario Landi; Dino Risi; Carlo Terron
- Produced by: Franco Cancellieri
- Starring: Luciano Tajoli; Antonella Lualdi; Carlo Ninchi
- Cinematography: Francesco Fekete
- Edited by: Marcella Gengarelli
- Music by: Luciano Maraviglia; Ferruccio Martinelli
- Production company: Filmolimpia
- Distributed by: Variety Distribution
- Release date: 9 October 1950
- Running time: 88 minutes
- Country: Italy
- Language: Italian
- Box office: ₤377 million

Songs in the Streets (Italian: Canzoni per le strade) is a 1950 Italian musical melodrama film directed by Mario Landi and starring Luciano Tajoli, Antonella Lualdi and Carlo Ninchi.

== Cast ==
- Luciano Taioli as Luciano Landi
- Antonella Lualdi as Anna
- Vera Bergman as Susanna
- Carlo Ninchi as Carlone
- Ernesto Calindri as Commendatore Stefano Suvoldi
- Anna Maria Bottini as Marta
- Eduardo Passarelli as Man from Naples
- Giorgio Berti
- Egisto Olivieri
- Gastone Barontini
- Gianni Berti
- Romolo Costa
- Renato Nardi
- Antonio Saviotti
- Franco Volpi

== Bibliography ==
- Chiti, Roberto & Poppi, Roberto. Dizionario del cinema italiano: Dal 1945 al 1959. Gremese Editore, 1991.
