= Gianni Dei =

Italian actor and singer (1940–2020)

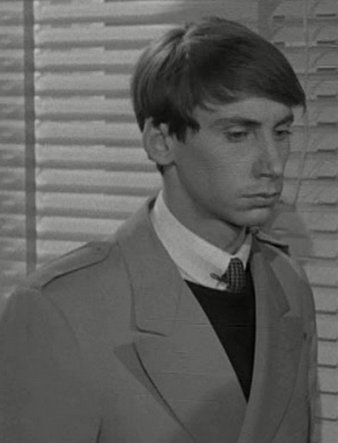
- Gianni Dei in the movie I due pericoli pubblici (1964)
- Born: 21 December 1940; Bologna, Kingdom of Italy
- Died: 19 October 2020 (aged 79)
- Occupations: Actor; singer
- Years active: 1959–2012 (actor); 1988–2017 (singer)

Gianni Dei (21 December 1940 – 19 October 2020) was an Italian actor and singer.

== Life and career ==
Born in Bologna, after completing his high school studies Dei moved to Rome to pursue an acting career. He made his film debut in 1960, in a minor role in Mario Camerini's Run with the Devil. After several minor appearances, he debuted in a main role in 1967, in the Massimo Franciosa's teen romantic comedy Pronto... c'è una certa Giuliana per te. His career was later characterized by several other main roles, but always in B-movies and low-budget films, notably the title role in the horror film Patrick Still Lives. From the late 1980s he was also active as a pop singer.

== Selected filmography ==
- A Girl... and a Million (1962)
- The Seventh Grave (1965)
- Sheriff Won't Shoot (1965)
- La donnaccia (1965)
- Pronto... c'è una certa Giuliana per te (1967)
- Madame Bovary (1969)
- A White Dress for Marialé (1972)
- The Last Round (1972)
- The Killers Are Our Guests (1974)
- Sex, Demons and Death (1975)
- Batton Story (1976)
- Campagnola bella (1976)
- Giallo a Venezia (1979)
- Patrick Still Lives (1980)
