= The Virgo, the Taurus and the Capricorn =

1977 film by Luciano Martino

- Directed by: Luciano Martino
- Written by: Luciano Martino; Francesco Milizia; Cesare Frugoni
- Starring: Alberto Lionello; Edwige Fenech
- Cinematography: Giancarlo Ferrando
- Music by: Franco Pisano
- Release date: 1977
- Language: Italian

La vergine, il toro e il capricorno (internationally released as The Virgo, the Taurus and the Capricorn, Erotic Exploits of a Sexy Seducer, Not Tonight Darling (not to be confused with the 1971 British drama Not Tonight, Darling), Bull by the Horns and The Virgin, the Bull and the Capricorn) is a 1977 Italian sexy comedy film directed by Luciano Martino. According to the film critic Paolo Mereghetti, the film is "one of the most funny films" in the commedia sexy all'italiana genre.

== Plot ==
An established Milanese architect who lives in Rome, indomitable unfaithful to his wife, does everything not to be discovered by her. But when this happens, the wife takes revenge by cheating on her husband with a young architecture student.

== Cast ==
- Alberto Lionello: Gianni Ferretti
- Edwige Fenech: Gioia Ferretti
- Aldo Maccione: Felice Spezzaferri
- Alvaro Vitali: Alvaro
- Mario Carotenuto: Comm. Benito Gussoni
- Ray Lovelock: Patrizio Marchi
- Erna Schürer: Tourist with Patrizio
- Olga Bisera: Enrica
- Riccardo Garrone: Husband of Enrica
- Michele Gammino: Raffaele
- Patrizia Webley: Wife of Raffaele
- Giacomo Rizzo: Peppino Ruotolo
- Ugo Bologna: Father of Gianni
- Gianfranco Barra: Alberto Scapicolli
- Lars Bloch: American professor
- Lia Tanzi: Luisa
