= Ritorna il tenente Sheridan =

- Genre: Detective fiction
- Starring: Ubaldo Lay; Carlo Alighiero; Walter Maestosi; Gigi Pirarba
- Country of origin: Italy
- Original language: Italian
- No. of seasons: 1
- No. of episodes: 6

Production
- Running time: 60 min.

Original release
- Network: Programma Nazionale
- Release: October 20 – December 1, 1963

Ritorna il tenente Sheridan is an Italian television series in six episodes of the detective genre, produced in 1963 by RAI and centered around the figure of Lieutenant Sheridan, played by the actor Ubaldo Lay. It was created by screenwriters Mario Casacci, Alberto Ciambricco and Giuseppe Aldo Rossi, and directed by Mario Landi.
