= Femi Benussi =

Yugoslav-Italian actress (born 1945)

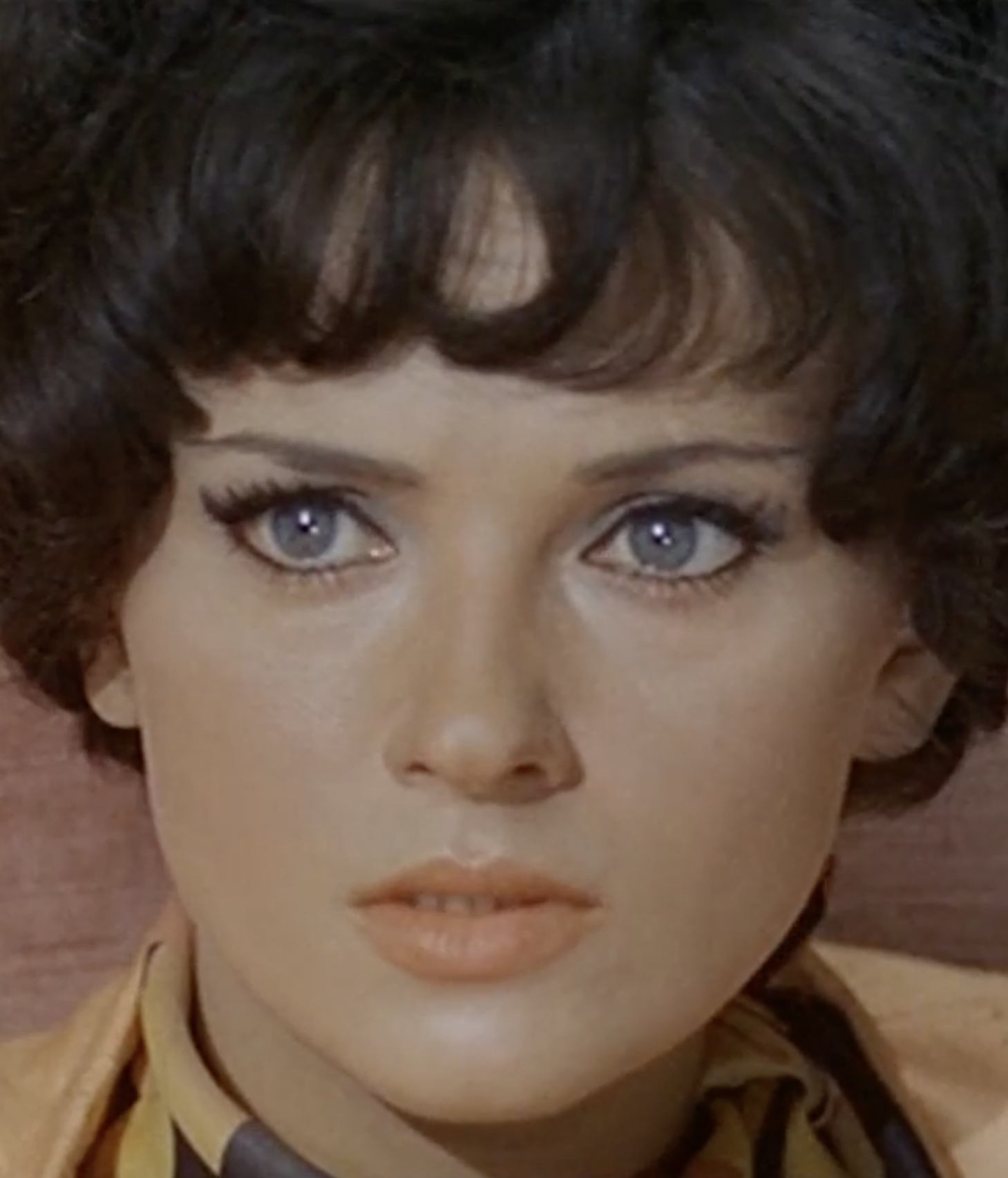
- Benussi in Deadly Inheritance (1968)
- Born: 4 March 1945 (age 81); Rovigno, Italian Social Republic (now Rovinj, Croatia)
- Occupation: Actress
- Years active: 1965–1983

Eufemia "Femi" Benussi (born 4 March 1945) is a Croatian-Italian retired actress. She appeared in 82 films, between 1965 and 1983, mainly in sex comedies and genre films.

== Early life ==
Benussi was born to Istrian Italian parents in Rovigno (present-day Rovinj, Croatia) which was then governed as part of the short-lived Italian Social Republic. She was educated in Pula and debuted on stage at the Teatro del Popolo of Rijeka.

At age 19, she declined a starring role in a play directed by Fadil Hadžić in order to go to Rome, where she was discovered by director Pasquale Festa Campanile.

== Career ==
Benussi played the leading role in the 1965 horror film Bloody Pit of Horror, the stage name Femy Martin. The following year, she was cast by Pier Paolo Pasolini in a major role in the comedy The Hawks and the Sparrows.

Benussi was mainly active in genre films, and in the 70s she became a star of the commedia sexy all'italiana subgenre. Dissatisfied with the quality of roles she was offered, she retired from acting in the early 1980s.

After retiring, Benussi returned to live in her native Yugoslavia, but fled as a refugee during the Croatian War of Independence, and subsequently re-settled in Rome. According to Benussi, her family was targeted and her dog killed after she denounced the war crimes taking places.

== Selected filmography ==
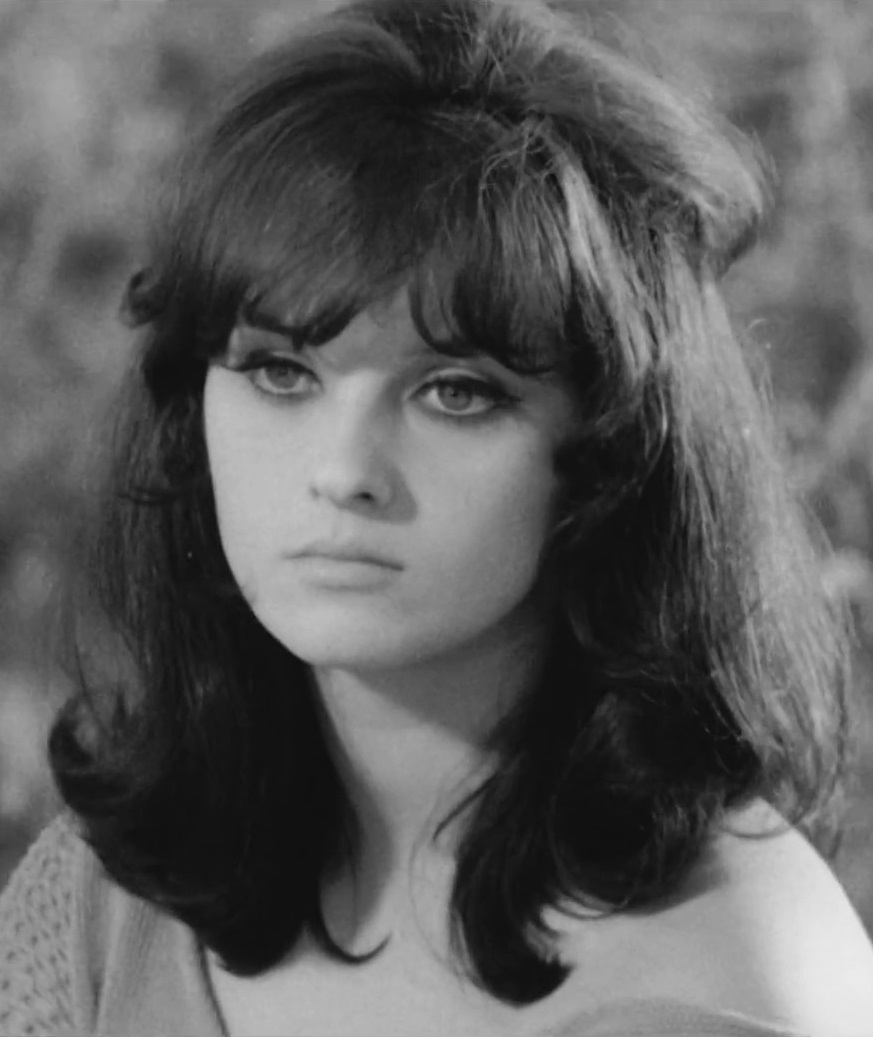
Benussi in The Hawks and the Sparrows (1966)

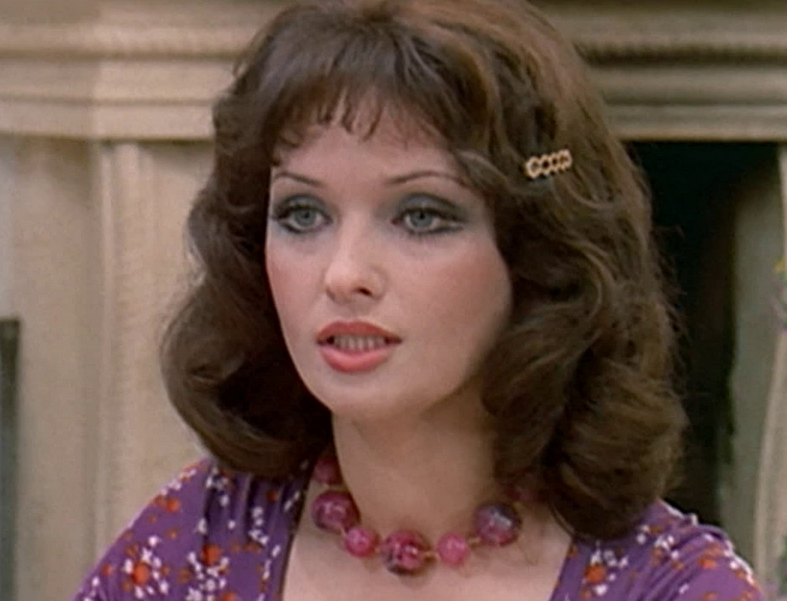
Benussi in I sette magnifici cornuti (1974)

- Bloody Pit of Horror (1965)
- The Hawks and the Sparrows (1966)
- Death Walks in Laredo (1966)
- Il tempo degli avvoltoi (1967)
- Born to Kill (1967)
- Deadly Inheritance (1968)
- Requiem for a Gringo (1968)
- Death Knocks Twice (1969)
- Poppea's Hot Nights (1969)
- Tarzana, the Wild Girl (1969)
- Hatchet for the Honeymoon (1970)
- Man of the Year (1971)
- The Beasts (1971)
- The Italian Connection (1972)
- So Sweet, So Dead (1972)
- Poppea: A Prostitute in Service of the Emperor (1972)
- The Countess Died of Laughter (1973)
- Special Killers (1973)
- My Pleasure Is Your Pleasure (1973)
- House of 1000 Pleasures (1973)
- Il domestico (1974)
- The Sensual Man (1974)
- The Stranger and the Gunfighter (1974)
- The Killer Must Kill Again (1975)
- Nude per l'assassino (1975)
- The Bloodsucker Leads the Dance (1975)
- Private Lessons (1975)
- La novizia (1975)
- Le dolci zie (1975)
- Campagnola bella (1976)
- Confessions of a Frustrated Housewife (1976)
- La professoressa di lingue (1976)
- Classe mista (1976)
- Batton Story (1976)
- Sins in the Country (1976)
