= Guido Leontini =

Italian actor (1927–1996)

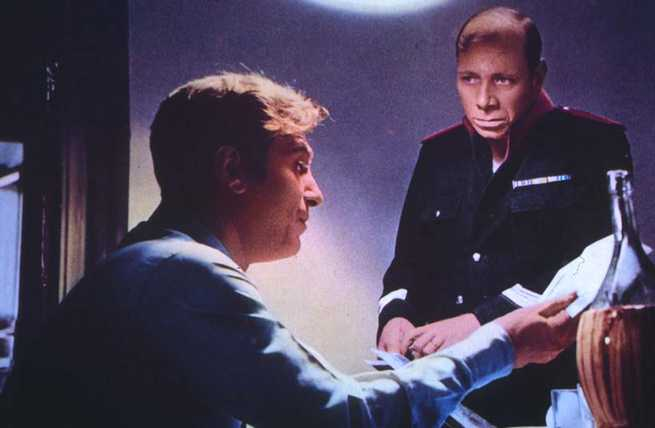
- Nino Manfredi and Guido Leontini in The Assassin of Rome (1972)
- Born: 21 March 1927; Catania, Italy
- Died: 27 April 1996 (aged 69); Roma, Italy
- Occupation: Actor

Guido Leontini (21 March 1927 – 26 April 1996) was an Italian stage, film and television actor.

== Life and career ==
Born in Catania into a family of actors, Leontini debuted on stage in the post-World War II era, specializing in the Luigi Pirandello's repertoire. From 1962 to 1972 he was a member of the Teatro Stabile di Catania. In films, he was mainly cast in roles of tough guys or villains.

== Partial filmography ==
- Made in Italy (1965)
- The Valachi Papers (1972) - Tony Bender
- The Sicilian Checkmate (1972) - Vacirca
- Shadows Unseen (1972) - Turi Delogo
- The Assassin of Rome (1972) - Apicella
- Black Turin (1972) - Trotta
- The Funny Face of the Godfather (1973) - Tom Iager
- The Inconsolable Widow Thanks All Those Who Consoled Her (1973) - Tonnozzo Prevosti
- Crazy Joe (1974) - Angelo
- Three Tough Guys (1974) - Sgt. Sam
- Emergency Squad (1974) - Mario Berlotti a.k.a. "Cranio"
- Silence the Witness (1974) - Mancuso
- Ante Up (1974) - Spreafico
- Paolo il freddo (1974) - The husband
- Blonde in Black Leather (1975) - Marito di Laura
- Due Magnum .38 per una città di carogne (1975) - Sergio, detto 'Er Piattola'
- Season for Assassins (1975) - Brigadeer
- La bolognese (1975) - Pietro
- Deported Women of the SS Special Section (1976) - Dobermann
- Blazing Flowers (1978) - Don Chicco
- Brothers Till We Die (1978) - Mario Di Gennaro, "Er Sogliola"
- L'educatore autorizzato (1980) - Il direttore
- The Warning (1980) - Gianfranco Puma
- The Mafia Triangle (1981) - Malvasia
