= Patrizia Webley =

Italian actress (born 1950)

- Born: Patrizia De Rossi; 1 December 1950 (age 75); Rome, Italy
- Other names: Patrizia De Rossi
- Occupation: Actress
- Years active: 1975–1981

Patrizia Webley (born and sometimes credited as Patrizia De Rossi, 1 December 1950) is an Italian actress. She acted mainly in horror films and erotic films.

== Career ==
She began her career as an actress in Italian erotic comedies in 1975 with the film Gli angeli dalle mani bendate with Rossano Brazzi, later she participated in films such as The Bloodsucker Leads the Dance, Movie rush - La febbre del cinema (it), Ragazza alla pari, and Classe mista, among others. She also makes an appearance in Salon Kitty. Since the early eighties she retired from acting, her last appearance dates from 1981 with the miniseries Seagull Island (it).

== Filmography ==
Year	Title	Role	Notes
1975	Giro, giro, tondo... con il sesso è bello il mondo		
1975	Gli angeli dalle mani bendate		
1975	The Bloodsucker Leads the Dance	Evelyn	
1976	Salon Kitty	New Kitty Girl	
1976	Sex Diary	Nicole - wife of Lattanzi	
1976	Ragazza alla pari	Magdalena	
1976	Classe mista	Prof. De Santis	
1976	Movie rush - La febbre del cinema (it)	Wife of Guzzini	
1977	The Virgo, the Taurus and the Capricorn	Raffaele's Wife	
1977	Gola profonda nera	Angelica	
1977	Le calde notti di Caligola (it)	Blonde Lesbian	
1977	La sorprendente eredità del tonto di mammà		
1979	Malabimba – The Malicious Whore	Nais / Adolfo's wife	
1979	Tre sotto il lenzuolo (it)	Lover of the porter	(segment "No, non è per gelosia")
1977	Un'ombra nell'ombra	Prostitute	
1979	Play Motel	Valeria Marzotti	
1980	Il lupo e l'agnello		
