= Hallucination Strip =

1975 Italian poliziottesco film

- DVD cover
- Directed by: Lucio Marcaccini
- Starring: Bud Cort
- Cinematography: Gino Santini
- Music by: Albert Verrecchia
- Release date: 18 December 1975
- Country: Italy
- Language: Italian

Hallucination Strip (Italian: Roma drogata: la polizia non può intervenire) is a 1975 Italian poliziottesco film directed by Lucio Marcaccini as his first and only film.

Singer Sammy Barbot appeared in the film and performed the film's opening song "We've Got A Lord". The song appeared on the film's original soundtrack.

== Plot ==
Massimo Monaldi, a student involved in political protests, steals a valuable tobacco box and becomes entangled in a deadly web between the police and the mafia.

== Cast ==
- Bud Cort as Massimo Monaldi
- Marcel Bozzuffi as Commissioner De Stefani
- Eva Czemerys as Rudy's mother
- Guido Alberti as Chief of Police
- Settimio Segnatelli as Rudy
- Annarita Grapputo as Cinzia
- Leopoldo Trieste as Killer
- Maurizio Arena as Buscemi a.k.a. "The Sicilian"
- Ennio Balbo as Antique dealer
- Umberto Raho as Giovanni
- Sammy Barbot as Singer
- Patrizia Gori as Alberta Ferri
