= Andrea Bianchi =

Italian film director and writer (1925–2013)

- Born: 31 March 1925; Rome, Kingdom of Italy
- Died: 14 November 2013 (aged 88); Nice, France
- Occupation: Film director

Andrea Bianchi (31 March 1925 – 14 November 2013) was an Italian film director and writer.

== Filmography ==
- Diabólica malicia (1972) (as Andrew White) (uncredited in English version)
- Treasure Island (1972) (as Andrew White) (uncredited in English version)
- Cry of a Prostitute (1974)
- Basta con la guerra... facciamo l'amore (1974)
- Nude per l'assassino (1975) a/k/a Strip Nude for Your Killer
- La Moglie di mio padre (1976)
- Cara dolce nipote (1977)
- La Moglie siciliana (1978)
- Malabimba – The Malicious Whore (1979) (as Andrew White)
- The Erotic Dreams of a Lady (1980)
- Le notti del terrore / Nights of Terror (1981) a/k/a Burial Ground
- Piège pour une femme seule (1982)
- Altri desideri particolari (1983)
- Giochi carnali (1983)
- Morbosamente vostra (1985) (as Andrew White)
- Dolce pelle di Angela (1986)
- Maniac Killer (1987)
- Incontri in case private (1988) (as Andrew White)
- Racconti di donne (1988) (as Andrew White)
- Commando Mengele (1988) (as A. Frank Drew White)
- Massacre (1989)
- Io Gilda (1989)
- Qualcosa in più (1990) (as Andrew White)
- Gioco di seduzione (1990)
- Bambola di carne (1991) (as Andrew White)
- Formula 3 – I ragazzi dell'autodromo (1993)
