= Marcello Andrei =

Italian film director and screenwriter

- Born: 1922; Rome, Italy
- Other names: Mark Andrew
- Occupation(s): Film director, screenwriter
- Years active: 1957–1988

Marcello Andrei (born 1922) is an Italian film director and screenwriter.

Born in Rome, Andrei started his career in the early 1950s as assistant director. He then made his directorial debut in 1956 with Borung, a documentary film set in Indonesia. He is one of the founders of the Festival dei Popoli which has been held in Florence since 1959.

== Filmography ==
Director and screenwriter

- 1963 - La smania addosso (a.k.a. The Eye of the Needle)
- 1974 - Verginità
- 1974 - Un fiocco nero per Deborah (a.k.a. A Black Ribbon for Deborah)
- 1975 - Il tempo degli assassini (a.k.a. Season for Assassins)
- 1976 - Scandalo in famiglia
- 1977 - El Macho (as Mark Andrew)
- 1988 - Aurora Express, una forza al servizio della pace

Director

- 1957 - Arcipelago di fuoco

Screenwriter

- 1987 - Mosca addio
