= Mario Casacci =

Italian screenwriter (1925–1995)

- Born: 12 August 1925; Pontedera
- Died: 8 July 1995 (aged 69); Rome
- Occupation: Screenwriter
- Known for: Ritorna il tenente Sheridan

Mario Casacci (12 August 1925, in Pontedera – 8 July 1995, in Rome) was an Italian screenwriter. He is best known as the co-creator of the character of Lieutenant Sheridan, who was played on the small screen by the actor Ubaldo Lay. Casacci's co-creator was his colleague Alberto Ciambricco In 1959, he also co-created, again with Ciambricco, the television program Giallo club.

== Selected filmography ==
=== Television ===
- 1959-1961: Giallo club. Invito al poliziesco
- 1963: Ritorna il tenente Sheridan
- 1968-1973: I ragazzi di padre Tobia

=== Film ===
- 1966: Rojo
