= Season for Assassins =

- Italian film poster for Seasons of Assassins
- Directed by: Marcello Andrei
- Screenplay by: Piero Regnoli; Alvaro Fabrizo; Marcello Andrei
- Story by: Piero Regnoli; Alvaro Fabrizo; Marcello Andrei
- Produced by: Adelina Tattilo; Carlo Maietto
- Starring: Joe Dallesandro; Martin Balsam; Magali Noël; Rossano Brazzi; Guido Leontini
- Cinematography: Luciano Trasatti
- Edited by: Giulio Berruti
- Music by: Albert Verrecchia
- Production company: Mirage Cinmeatographica
- Distributed by: Agora
- Release date: 27 December 1975 (Italy)
- Country: Italy
- Box office: ₤354 million

Season for Assassins (Italian: Il tempo degli assassini, also known as The Time of the Assassin and Mad Men) is a 1975 Italian poliziottesco-drama film written and directed by Marcello Andrei.

== Cast ==
- Joe Dallesandro as Piero Giaranaldi
- Martin Balsam as Commissioner Catrone
- Magali Noël as Rossana
- Rossano Brazzi as Father Eugenio
- Guido Leontini as Brigadeer

== Production ==
Filmed at Incir-De Paolis in Rome and on location in Rome.

== Release ==
Season for Assassins was released in Italy on 27 December 1975 where it was distributed by Agora. The film grossed a total of 354,087,000 lire on its theatrical release.
