= Silence the Witness =

- Directed by: Giuseppe Rosati
- Cinematography: Franco Villa
- Music by: Francesco De Masi
- Release date: 1974
- Country: Italy
- Language: Italian

Silence the Witness (Italian: Il testimone deve tacere) is a 1974 Italian poliziottesco film written and directed by Giuseppe Rosati.

== Cast ==
- Bekim Fehmiu: Dr. Giorgio Sironi
- Rosanna Schiaffino: Luisa Sironi
- Aldo Giuffrè: Inspector Santi
- Guido Leontini: Mancuso
- Romolo Valli: The Minister
- Elio Zamuto: Judge Belli
- Luigi Pistilli: Inspector De Luca
- Claudio Nicastro: Commander
- Guido Alberti: Chief of Police
- Franco Ressel: Aldo Marchetti
- Liana Trouche: Santi's wife
- Daniele Vargas: Senator Torrisi
- Luciano Rossi: Antonio
- Enzo Maggio: Clerk
