= Don't Trust the Mafia =

- Directed by: Mario Bianchi
- Screenplay by: Antonio Cucca; Claudio Fragasso
- Story by: Antonio Cucca; Claudio Fragasso
- Starring: Gabriele Tinti; Paola Senatore; Pino Mauro; Richard Harrison
- Cinematography: Maurizio Salvatori
- Edited by: Cesare Bianchini
- Music by: Tullio De Piscopo
- Production company: Falco Film
- Distributed by: ASA Cinematografica
- Release date: 12 May 1979 (Italy)
- Running time: 93 minutes
- Country: Italy
- Language: Italian
- Box office: ₤16.5 million

Don't Trust the Mafia (Italian: I guappi non si toccano) is a 1979 Italian crime film directed by Mario Bianchi.

== Plot ==
Montano's dead body is found after being kidnapped by Maurice. The police plans to use the same ways criminals use and infiltrate Tony Lo Bianco in the gang. Tony is a former FBI agent who is sent back to Italy for many crimes. Police Superintendent Ferrari disagrees but Tony begins his operations and meets Paulette, Maurice's daughter. Tony and Paulette find out that perhaps Maurice is not responsible for Montano's death and they discover they have to struggle to save their lives.

== Production ==
Don't Trust the Mafia was filmed at R.T.A. Elios in Rome and on location in Aversa. It was one of the three crime films director Mario Bianchi filmed in Naples between 1978 and 1979.

== Release ==
Don't Trust the Mafia was released in Italy on 12 May 1979, where it was distributed by ASA Cinematografica. The film grossed 16.5 million Italian lira on its theatrical release. The film was released with the English-language title on Danish VHS as Don't Trust the Mafia.

== Reception ==
In a retrospective review, Roberto Curti stated that Bianchi's direction was "perfunctory as ever" with his "shoestring budget" being revealed "in every shot".
