= Ragazza alla pari =

1976 film by Mino Guerrini

- Directed by: Mino Guerrini
- Written by: Paolo Barberio
- Starring: Gloria Guida; Oreste Lionello; Rossella Como
- Cinematography: Pier Luigi Santi
- Music by: Pulsar
- Release date: 1976
- Language: Italian

Ragazza alla pari (internationally released as The Best and Au-Pair Girl) is a 1976 commedia sexy all'italiana directed by Mino Guerrini.

== Plot ==
Domenica, a farmer girl from Val Brembana, becomes the au pair girl of the Chiocchietti family in Rome.

== Cast ==
- Gloria Guida as Domenica Schlutzer
- Oreste Lionello as Mr. Chiocchetti
- Rossella Como as Miss Chiocchetti
- Patrizia Webley
- Carlo Giuffrè
- Dada Gallotti

== Reception ==
Cinematografo, the Italian database for films, describes the film's last scene, in which an old libidinous man dies of apoplexy while the character of Domenica is satisfying her desires, as "the inglorious ending of a boring film, deprived of any psychological motivation, of any logic, and without any cinematographic structure or the minimum presence of any filmic language."

== See also ==
- List of Italian films of 1976
