= Aretino's Stories of the Three Lustful Daughters =

1972 film

- Directed by: Silvio Amadio
- Screenplay by: Enrico Bomba
- Produced by: Sergio Simonetti
- Starring: Franca Gonella; Ivana Novak; Dorit Henke
- Cinematography: Antonio Modica
- Edited by: Cesare Bianchini
- Music by: Vittorio Stagni; Elio Maestosi
- Release date: 1972
- Country: Italy
- Language: Italian

Aretino's Stories of the Three Lustful Daughters (Italian: ...e si salvò solo l'Aretino Pietro, con una mano davanti e l'altra dietro..., lit. '...and only Pietro Aretino was saved, with one hand in front and the other behind...') is a 1972 commedia sexy all'italiana film directed by Silvio Amadio and starring Franca Gonella.

== Cast ==
- Franca Gonella as Nanna
- Ivana Novak as Concetta
- Dorit Henke as Fiorenza
- Elisa Mainardi as Violante
- Giorgio Favretto as Friar Fazio
- Silvio Spaccesi as Ser Cecco
- Renzo Rinaldi as Friar Crispino
- Carla Brait as Olimpia
- Vincenzo Ferro as Ser Alfiuccio da Candelusa
- Gino Milli as Guidotto
- Piero Maria Rossi as Raffaello
- Gabriele Villa as Pietro Aretino

== Production ==
The film was produced by Cinematografica Vascello. It is the second decameronico film based on the works by Pietro Aretino, following by two weeks the release of the less successful Le notti peccaminose di Pietro l'Aretino by Silvio Amadio. It was shot in Arpino and in other locations in the Frosinone province. It was filmed back-to-back with its immediate sequel, Aretino's Blue Stories, directed by Enrico Bomba and featuring most of the same cast.

== Release ==
The film was distributed in Italian cinemas by Peg starting from 19 August 1972.

== Reception ==
Italian film critic Manlio Gomarasca panned the film, noting: "it lacks brilliant writing in its triviality,[...] it lacks the substance of a genuine Atellan Farce".
