= Mariangela Giordano =

Italian actress (1937–2011)

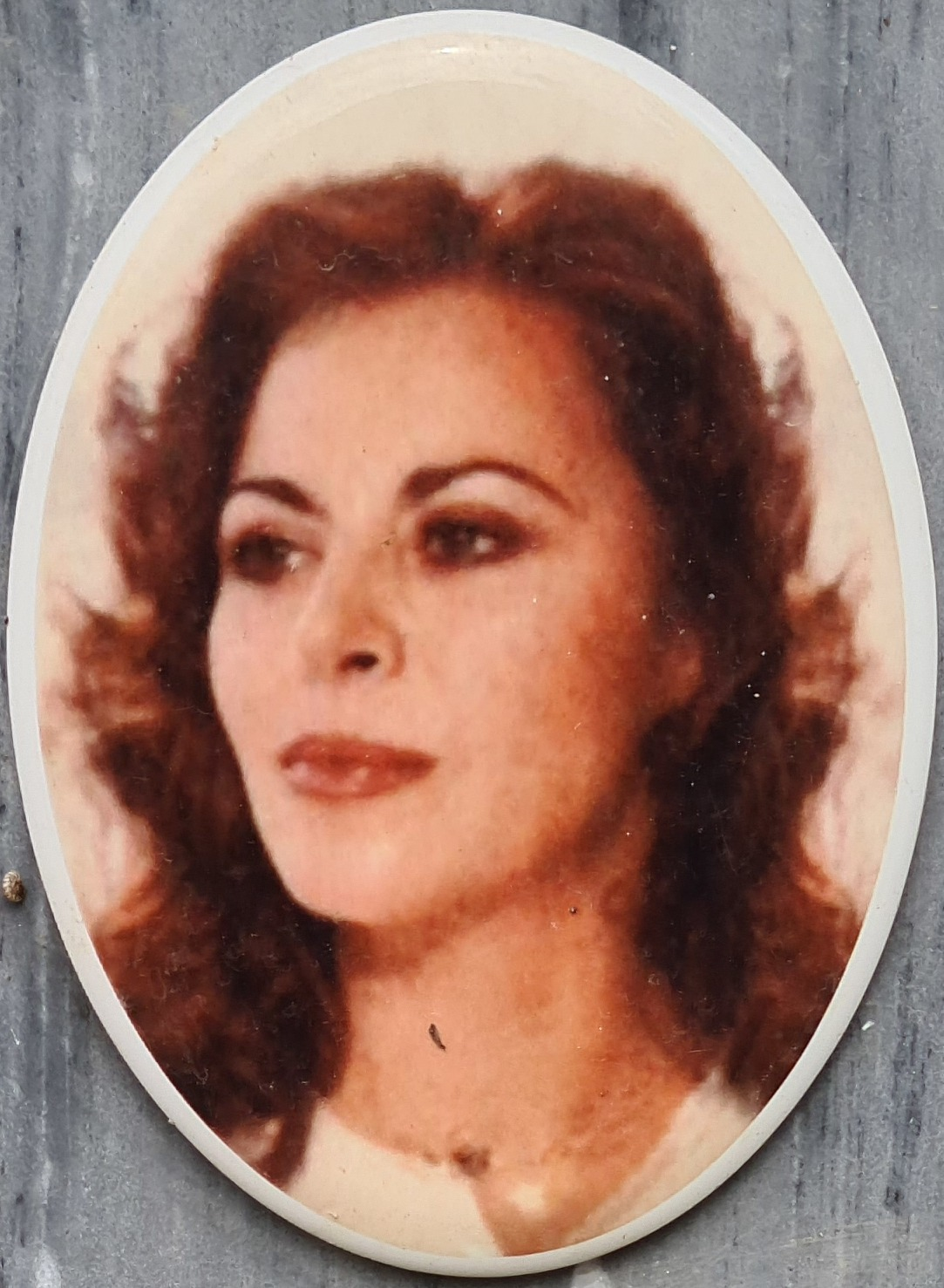
- Born: 2 August 1937; Dolcedo, Imperia, Kingdom of Italy
- Died: 16 July 2011 (aged 73); Dolcedo, Imperia, Italy
- Other name: Mary Jordan
- Occupation: Actress

Mariangela Giordano (2 August 1937 – 16 July 2011) was an Italian film and television actress.

== Life and career ==
Born in Dolcedo, Italy as Maria Angela Giordano, the daughter of a journalist, Giordano was elected Miss Liguria in 1954. Then she almost immediately started an intense film career, mainly appearing in genre films in which she was sometimes credited as Mary Jordan. She is known to cult horror movie fans for her starring roles in Giallo in Venice, Patrick Lives Again, The Devil's Daughter, Satan's Baby Doll, Burial Ground and Killer Barbys.

Since the 1980s, Giordano focused her career on television, appearing in the TV series Skipper and I ragazzi del muretto, among others. She died in Dolcedo on 16 July 2011.

== Selected filmography ==
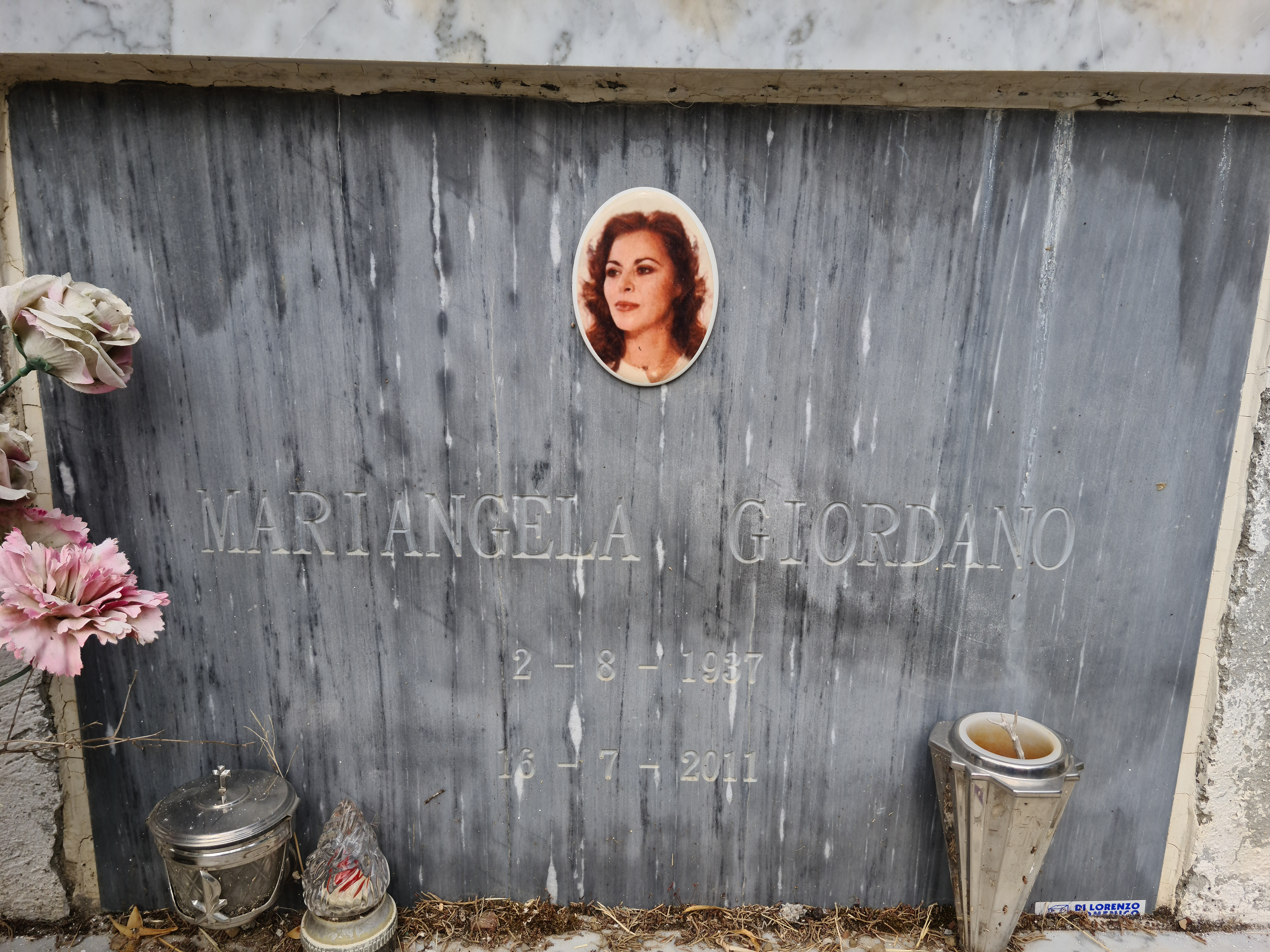
Grave of Giordano in the cemetery of Dolcedo

- Il falco d'oro (1955) - Seconda domestica
- Cortile (1955) - The Girl asking Gargiulo for a Lift (uncredited)
- Dramma nel porto (1955)
- Da qui all'eredità (1955)
- La banda degli onesti (1956) - (uncredited)
- Il diavolo nero (1957)
- Desert Warrior (1957) - Aicha
- Mensajeros de paz (1957) - Marichu
- Buongiorno primo amore! (1957)
- Quando gli angeli piangono (1958)
- Cara de Goma (1959)
- Colossus and the Amazon Queen (1960) (a.k.a. Queen of the Amazons) - Amazzone
- Ursus (1961)
- Gli scontenti (1961)
- Black City (1961) - Ragazza che si finge incinta
- Romulus and the Sabines (1961)
- Ursus (1960) (a.k.a. Ursus, Son of Hercules) - Annia
- El reflejo del alma (1962)
- Canzoni a tempo di twist (1962)
- The Eye of the Needle (1963) - Carmelina Lo Niro
- The Last Gun (1964)
- Sette a Tebe (1964) - Serva di Cirene
- A Maiden for a Prince (1965) - La marchesa spagnola
- Te lo leggo negli occhi (1965)
- Djurado (1966) - Dorianne
- How I Learned to Love Women (1966) - Proprietaria stazione di servizio
- Vengeance (1968) - Rosita
- No Graves on Boot Hill (1968) - Betty Fletcher
- I quattro del pater noster (1969)
- A Noose for Django (1969) - Dolores Roja
- The Reward's Yours... The Man's Mine (1969) - Babe
- The Legacy of Caine (1971)
- Decameron n° 2 - Le altre novelle del Boccaccio (1972) - Ferondo's wife
- Decameron n° 4 - Le belle novelle del Boccaccio (1972) - Tessa
- The Lusty Wives of Canterbury (1972)
- Quant'è bella la Bernarda, tutta nera, tutta calda (1975) - Eleonora (segment "Eleonora e Sigismondo")
- L'altro Dio (1975) - Adriana
- Don Milani (1976) - Donna
- Big Pot (1976) - Amante di Sandro
- Che dottoressa ragazzi! (1976) - Rosalia
- The Last Round (1976) - Lisa's mother
- Batton Story (1976) - Priscilla - mother of Stefano
- Un giorno alla fine di ottobre (1977) - La segretaria di Lorenzo
- Dove volano i corvi d'argento (1977) - Basilia
- Moglie nuda e siciliana (1978) - Bianca
- Il commissario di ferro (1978) - Signora Parolini
- Malabimba – The Malicious Whore (1979) - Suor Sofia
- Giallo a Venezia (1979) (a.k.a. Giallo in Venice) - Stella Randolph
- Patrick Is Still Alive (1980) (a.k.a. Patrick Lives Again)
- Burial Ground (1981) (a.k.a. Nights of Terror) - Evelyn
- Paula Mujer de la Noche (1981)
- Eroticón (1981) - Zulma Santana
- Satan's Baby Doll (1982) (a.k.a. La Bimba di Satana) - Sol
- Il motorino (1984)
- Noi uomini duri (1987) - Teresa
- Io e mia sorella (1987) - Nadia
- Il volpone (1988) - Eliana Voltore
- Captain Fracassa's Journey (1990)
- Stasera a casa di Alice (1990) - Medium
- The Devil's Daughter (1991) (a.k.a. La Secta/ The Sect) - Kathryn
- Abbronzatissimi (1991) - Madre di Martina
- Women in Arms (1991) - Miss Locasciulli
- Ci hai rotto papà (1993) - Suor Giovanna
- Let's Not Keep in Touch (1994) - Amante in 'Galline da combattimento'
- Once a Year, Every Year (1994)
- Killer Barbys (1996, directed by Jesus Franco) - Condesa (Countess)
- Panarea (1997) - Signora Bedoni
- A luci spente (2004)
- Sacred Heart (2005)
