= Classe mista =

1976 film by Mariano Laurenti

- Directed by: Mariano Laurenti
- Written by: Marino Onorati; Francesco Milizia; Franco Mercuri
- Starring: Dagmar Lassander; Alfredo Pea
- Cinematography: Federico Zanni
- Music by: Gianni Ferrio
- Release date: 1976
- Language: Italian

Classe mista (internationally released as Coeds) is a 1976 commedia sexy all'italiana directed by Mariano Laurenti.

== Plot ==
Tonino is a high school student, in love with the new teacher of letters, Mrs. Moretti. One day Tonino and the teacher are kidnapped and locked up in a trullo where they consummate their love. Later, Moretti is transferred to Rome, and a new and beautiful teacher is assigned to Toninos class.

== Cast ==
- Femi Benussi as Zia Tecla
- Alfredo Pea as Tonino Licata
- Dagmar Lassander as Carla Moretti
- Mario Carotenuto as Felice Licata
- Gianfranco D'Angelo as Ciccio, il bidello
- Gabriele Di Giulio as Salvatore Scognamiglio
- Alvaro Vitali as Angelino Zampanò
- Patrizia Webley as Prof. De Santis
- Michele Gammino as Prof. Finocchiaro
