= La vedova e il piedipiatti =

- Directed by: Mario Landi
- Country of origin: Italy
- No. of seasons: 1
- No. of episodes: 6

Original release
- Release: July 3 – August 7, 1979

La vedova e il piedipiatti is an Italian television series directed by Mario Landi and consisting of six episodes. It starred Ave Ninchi, Enrico Papa and Veronica Lario, was one of the last RAI productions shot in black and white.

The serial is set in Turin; the two protagonists are the young police inspector Lombardi (Enricco Papa) and his landlady Avatar (Ave Ninchi), an eccentric widow, fortune teller and amateurish detective. Avatar helps Lombardi in his enquiries, with unorthodox but effective methods; besides, she tries unsuccessfully to match him with her pupil Maria Teresa (a young Veronica Lario, the future Silvio Berlusconi's wife).

== See also ==
- List of Italian television series
