= Sex Diary =

- Directed by: Bruno Gaburro
- Written by: Franco Bucceri; Roberto Leoni
- Produced by: Edmondo Amati
- Starring: Renzo Montagnani; Rossana Podestà; John Ireland
- Cinematography: Fausto Zuccoli
- Edited by: Vincenzo Tomassi
- Music by: Guido & Maurizio De Angelis
- Release date: 1976
- Country: Italy
- Language: Italian

Sex Diary (Italian: Il letto in piazza, lit. 'The bed in the square') is a 1976 Italian comedy film written and directed by Bruno Gaburro. It is based on a novel written by Nantas Salvalaggio.

== Cast ==
- Renzo Montagnani as Luca Reali
- Rossana Podestà as Serena
- John Ireland as Mr. Milton
- Sherry Buchanan as Jennifer Milton
- Giuseppe Anatrelli as Lattanzi
- Franco Bracardi as Adolfo
- Francesco D'Adda as Carluccio
- Daniele Formica as 'Tondino' Novati
- Patrizia De Clara as Luca's sister
- Ugo Fangareggi as 'Gandhi', Luca's brother-in-law
- Giuseppe Maffioli as Beppo
- Loretta Persichetti as Marisa
- Salvatore Puntillo as Policeman
- Giacomo Rizzo as Luca's friend
- Gabriele Tinti as Luca's friend
- Venantino Venantini as Bogart
- Patrizia Webley as Nicole, Lattanzi's wife

== Production ==
The film is an adaptation from Nantas Salvalaggio's 1968 novel Il letto in piazza, itself loosely based on real events that occurred in Cerano, Piedmont. The novel had previously been considered for a film project by Vittorio Gassman.

The film was produced by R.R.International. It was shot between Salò and Palatino Studios in Rome.

== See also ==
- List of Italian films of 1976
