= Solvi Stubing =

German actress (1941–2017)

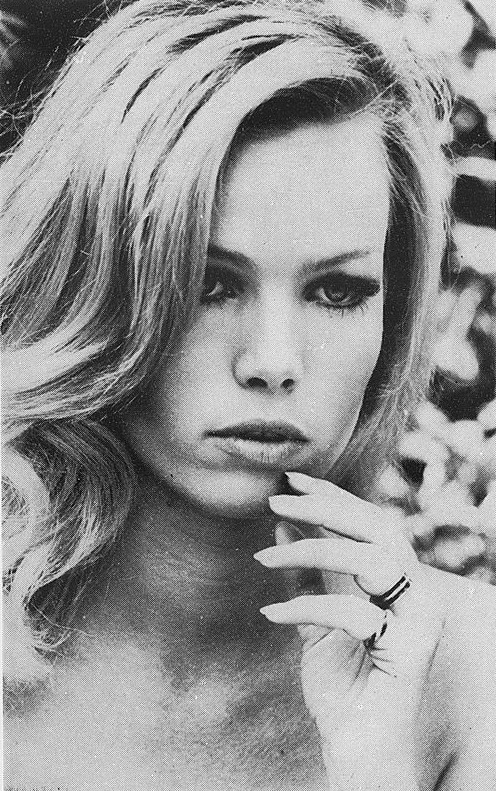
- Solvi Stubing in 1973
- Born: 19 January 1941; Berlin, Germany
- Died: 3 July 2017 (aged 76); Rome

Solvi Stubing (19 January 1941 – 3 July 2017) was a German actress and TV personality, mainly active in Italy.

Born in Berlin, Stubing obtained wide popularity in Italy with a commercial for Peroni Beer, and starred in many films, often of modest value, in several genres of Italian cinema. For many years, between the 1980s and the 1990s, she hosted a number of television programs about cinema.

Stubing died on 3 July 2017 in Rome, age 76.

== Partial filmography ==
- Le sette vipere (Il marito latino) (1964) - Inge
- Sheriff Won't Shoot (1965) - Rita, Orphan of the Sheriff
- I Knew Her Well (1965) - Susan - the foreign girl
- Made in Italy (1965) - Hostess
- Weekend, Italian Style (1965) - Miss Marini
- Me, Me, Me... and the Others (1966) - Passenger (uncredited)
- Secret Agent Super Dragon (1966) - Elizabeth
- Due mafiosi contro Al Capone (1966) - Ragazza del Night Club
- How We Robbed the Bank of Italy (1966) - Selma
- The Battle of the Mods (1966) - Diana
- Treasure of San Gennaro (1966) - The Nun
- Tiffany Memorandum (1967) - Hotel Maid
- The New Life Style (1968)
- Oswalt Kolle: Das Wunder der Liebe II – Sexuelle Partnerschaft (1968) - Petra
- The Young Tigers of Hong Kong (1969)
- Heintje: A Heart Goes on a Journey (1969) - Gerdi Weber
- Garringo (1969) - Julie
- Ich spüre deine Haut (1969) - Marion
- Die liebestollen Baronessen (1970) - Baroness Sylvia
- Pussycat, Pussycat, I Love You (1970) - Girl with door
- The Adventures of Gerard (1970) - (uncredited)
- Atemlos vor Liebe (1970) - Fritzi
- Blindman (1971) - Bride
- Le Amazzoni - Donne d'amore e di guerra (1973) - Sinade
- Strip Nude for Your Killer (1975) - Patrizia
- Deported Women of the SS Special Section (1976) - Fräulein Greta
- Brothers Till We Die (1978) - Marika Engver - embassy clerk
- Traffic Jam (1979) - Blonde Model
- Liebeskonzil (1982) - Heloise
- Delitti (1987) - Harriet Anderson
- Il punto rosso (2006) - Dott.ssa Tagliavia
