= The Bloodsucker Leads the Dance =

1975 film

- Directed by: Alfredo Rizzo
- Screenplay by: Alfredo Rizzo
- Story by: Alfredo Rizzo
- Starring: Femi Benussi; Giacomo Rossi Stuart; Krista Nell; Patrizia De Rossi
- Cinematography: Aldo Greci
- Edited by: Piera Bruni; Gianfranco Simoncelli
- Music by: Marcello Giombini
- Production company: To. Ro. Cinematografica
- Distributed by: P.A.B. Film
- Release date: 10 May 1975 (Italy)
- Running time: 86 minutes
- Country: Italy
- Box office: ₤73.369 million

The Bloodsucker Leads the Dance (Italian: La sanguisuga conduce la danza) is a 1975 Italian film directed by Alfredo Rizzo.

== Plot ==
In Ireland in 1902, Count Marnak invites a troupe of actors to perform at his island castle. He is stunned by how much Evelyn, the lead actress, resembles his dead wife. They begin an affair, but suddenly, the inhabitants of the castle are turning up decapitated one by one. The count fears that an old family curse is responsible for the grisly slayings.

== Cast ==
- Patrizia De Rossi as Evelyn
- Giacomo Rossi-Stuart as Count Richard Marnack
- Femi Benussi as Sybil
- Krista Nell as Cora
- Luciano Pigozzi as Gregory
- Barbara Marzano
- Lidia Olizzi
- Suzette Nadalutti
- Mario Derosa
- Marzia Damon

== Style ==
Sometimes described as a giallo, The Bloodsucker Leads the Dance contains mysterious murders, but killing take place offscreen and lacks the gialli stylish depictions of death and lacks the psychedelic colors and weird camera angles and elaborate set pieces, and no black gloved killers. Italian film historian Roberto Curti described the film as a "standard Gothic yarn".

== Production ==
Part of the film was shot at Castello Piccolomini di Balsorano.

Prior to directing The Bloodsucker Leads the Dance, Alfredo Rizzo's career was as an actor who made his debut in the 1939 film Lo vedi come sei... lo vedi come sei?. This film marked his last feature as a director and his only horror film he directed. The film was shot between November and December 1974. It was shot at Piccolomini Castle in Balsorano, Castle of Monte San Giovanni Campano, Lake Bracciano and Icet De Paolis Studios in Milan.

Actress Krista Nell was originally going to play the lead, but took on a secondary part in the film due to her leukemia. One month after the film's release, Nell died to the disease.

== Release ==
The Bloodsucker Leads the Dance was released theatrically in Italy on 10 May 1975 where it was distributed by P.A.B. Film. The film grossed a total of 73,369,150 Italian lire. The Italian board of censors objected to the erotic content in the film, specifically the lesbian encounter between Rosalind and Penny and a sex scene between Evelyn and the Count. The sex scenes in the film were kept in their entirety in France in 1977 when the film was released as L'insatiable Samantha (La sangsue). This version also had hardcore footage inserted.

The film was released on home video in Italy as Il marchio di Satana.

== Critical reception ==
From retrospective reviews, AllMovie wrote, "In the hands of a better filmmaker, it might have been an interesting pastiche, or even played as a clever spoof, but Rizzo appears to have made the whole thing up as he went along", calling it "a fairly ordinary giallo thriller". Curti stated the "film's ineptitude is jaw-dropping", noting that the sea shown in the film is Bracciano lake and a storm features stock footage that is black-and-white in a color film. Curti also disliked the ending, declaring it "one of the most unclimatic endings ever seen in a horror movie".

== Footnotes ==
=== References ===
- Curti, Roberto (2017). Italian Gothic Horror Films, 1970–1979. McFarland. ISBN 978-1476629605.
- Luther-Smith, Adrian (1999). Blood and Black Lace: The Definitive Guide to Italian Sex and Horror Movies. Stray Cat Publishing Ltd.
