= Irene Aloisi =

Italian actress (1925–1980)

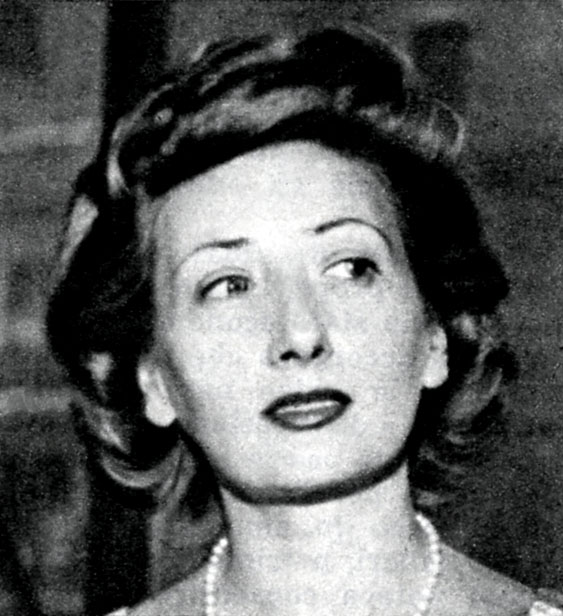
- Born: 20 May 1925; Milan, Kingdom of Italy
- Died: 1 January 1980 (aged 54); Rome, Italy
- Occupation: Actress
- Notable work: Full list

Irene Aloisi (20 May 1925 – 1 January 1980) was an Italian actress.

== Biography ==
Aloisi debuted under the show name of Alian and joined a theatre company with Ruggero Ruggeri. She performed in theatre, on television, and over the radio, including many radio dramas for the Rai di Torino station.

== Career ==
Aloisi's acting career spanned four decades, beginning in theatre in the mid-1940s to the late 1970s. On stage she performed at the Teatro Alessandro Bonci in Cesena in 1959-1960 and in Milan under the direction of Carlo Terrón in 1963. She appeared in television films such as Orgoglio e pregiudizio (1957) directed by Daniele D'Anza, La cittadella (1964) directed by Anton Giulio Majano, and the series Vivere insieme directed by Antonio De Gregorio and Giuliana Berlinguer.

== Bibliography ==
- Enrico Lancia, Roberto Poppi, Dizionario del cinema italiano: Le attrici, Gremese Editore, Rome, 2003, p. 11
