= Sex, Demons and Death =

1975 film

- Directed by: Salvatore Bugnatelli
- Screenplay by: Lorenzo Artale; Salvatore Bugnatelli
- Produced by: Sergio Simonetti
- Starring: Franca Gonella; Gabriele Tinti; Magda Konopka
- Cinematography: Remo Grisanti
- Edited by: Piera Bruni
- Music by: Giuliano Sorgini
- Release date: 1975
- Country: Italy
- Language: Italian

Sex, Demons and Death (Italian: Diabolicamente... Letizia, lit. 'Diabolically... Letizia') is a 1975 Italian giallo film co-written and directed by Salvatore Bugnatelli and starring Franca Gonella.

== Cast ==
- Franca Gonella as Letizia
- Gabriele Tinti as Marcello Martinozzi
- Magda Konopka as Micaela Martinozzi
- Gianni Dei as Giovanni
- Xiro Papas as Headmaster
- Karin Fiedler as Giselle
- Angelo Rizieri as Professor Minoldi
- Ada Pometti as Eva Minoldi
- Cesare De Vito as Police Commissioner

== Production ==
The film was produced by B.R.C. International Film.

== Reception ==
The film was considered a box-office bomb domestically, grossing 11.6 millions lire. A contemporary Corriere della Sera review described it as 'a macabre little film that combines exorcist-style thrills with men's magazine situations' which 'unfolds in a certain atmosphere of mystery, but soon turns out to be nothing more than a fleeting soap bubble'. Italian film historian Roberto Curti also panned the film, calling it 'dreadful'.
