= Satan's Baby Doll =

- Directed by: Mario Bianchi
- Screenplay by: Piero Regnoli
- Story by: Gabriele Crisanti
- Produced by: Gabriele Crisanti
- Starring: Jacqueline Dupré; Mariangela Giordano; Aldo Sambrell; Giancarlo Del Duca; Alfonso Gaita; Marina Hedman
- Cinematography: Franco Villa; Angelo Iannutti
- Edited by: Cesare Bianchini
- Music by: Nino Catanese
- Production company: Filmarte
- Distributed by: Film 2
- Release dates: 25 February 1983 (Spain); 29 July 1983 (Italy)
- Running time: 74 minutes
- Country: Italy

Satan's Baby Doll (Italian: La bimba di Satana ″the baby girl of Satan″) is a 1983 Italian horror film directed by Mario Bianchi.

== Plot ==
The daughter (Jacqueline Dupré) and brother of a dead aristocrat are placed in the care of an evil nun in a remote Spanish castle. The daughter embarks on a rampage of lust and murder after becoming possessed by the spirit of her dead mother.

== Cast ==
- Jaqueline Dupré as Miria Aguilar
- Mariangela Giordan as Sol
- Aldo Sanbrell as Antonio Aguilar
- Giuseppe Carbone (as Joe Davers) as Isidro
- Giancarlo Del Duca as Dr. Juan Suarez
- Alfonso Gaita as Ignazio Aguilar
- Marina Hedmann as Maria Aguilar

== Production ==
For Satan's Baby Doll, Gabriele Crisanti and screenwriter Piero Regnoli opted to remake the film Malabimba – The Malicious Whore, which included casting Mariangela Giordano to reprise her role. Giordano spoke negatively on the role, stating that remaking Malabimba was "a stupid move. I felt used, abused and exploited." It was the last film Giordano made with Crisanti, ending both their professional and personal relationships. Unlike Cristanti's earlier films, which were hybrids of sex and horror, the target for Satan's Baby Doll was for a hardcore pornography audience. This included casting Italy's best known pornographic actress of the period Marina Hedman and Alfonso Gaita, who was a regular in Italian hardcore pornography films of the period. Jacqueline Dupré was a stagename of an actress who Mario Bianchi stated he couldn't remember her real name, but recalled that she lived in Ostia and that this was seemingly her only film.

Filming began on August 17, 1981. Aldo Sambrell was involved in a unsimulated sex scene with Marina Hedman, which he later recalled: "We had to shoot a love scene, Marina and I... Well, I was lying on the bed, waiting for her, and when she showed up we started making out; after a while I realized that she was doing it for real and I had to stop her..." Sambrell contacted Crisanti to state he could not work under these conditions. Sambrell was replaced by Gaita for the explicit shots.

== Release ==
Satan's Baby Doll was submitted to the Italian rating board in June 1982 in a softcore version which had a running time of a little over 73 minutes. The film was first released in Spain on 25 February 1983 in a softcore version titled La hija de Satanas. The Spanish version was seen by 20,230 spectators and grossed a 2019 equivalent of 30,200 Euro. It was distributed theatrically in Italy by Film 2 on 29 July 1983. Although Bianchi and Cristanti had denied a hardcore version of the film had existed, a hardcore version of the film premiered on a German DVD in 2007. The hardcore version runs at 88 minutes.

== See also ==
- List of Italian films of 1983

== Footnotes ==
=== Sources ===
- Curti, Roberto (2019). Italian Gothic Horror Films, 1980-1989. McFarland. ISBN 978-1476672434.
