= Popcorn (Italian TV series) =

- Country of origin: Italy
- Original language: Italian
- No. of seasons: 6

Production
- Running time: 100 min

Original release
- Network: Canale 5
- Release: 1980 – 1985

Popcorn was an Italian pop music show which ran 1980–1985 on Canale 5 produced by Berlusconi's Fininvest. Hosts included Sammy Barbot, Tiziana Fiorveluti, Claudio Cecchetto, Augusto Martelli, Italy-based US singer Ronnie Jones and English actress Karina Huff.
