= El Macho =

- Directed by: Marcello Andrei
- Written by: Marcello Andrei; Fabio Pittorru
- Produced by: Riccardo Billi
- Starring: Carlos Monzón; George Hilton
- Cinematography: Luciano Trasatti
- Edited by: Otello Colangeli
- Music by: Marcello Ramoino
- Release date: 1977
- Running time: 95 minutes
- Countries: Italy; Argentina

El Macho (also known as Macho Killers) is a 1977 Italian-Argentine Spaghetti Western film written and directed by Marcello Andrei and starring Carlos Monzón, George Hilton, Malisa Longo and Susana Giménez.

== Synopsis ==
Kid El Macho, an adventurer who is very skilled with cards and his revolver, is instructed by a sheriff to recover a large sum of money, which was stolen after an attack on a stagecoach by the outlaw Hidalgo, a.k.a. "the Duke", and his gang. The Kid starts posing as The Vulture, another outlaw who is actually dead, but with whom Kid bears a strong resemblance, and seeks to infiltrate Hidalgo's gang under his assumed identity. El Macho succeeds in his enterprise by unmasking an unsuspecting banker who was the mastermind responsible for the robbery. The Kid hopes to share the bounty with his lover, the beautiful Kelly, but his adventures are not over yet.

== Cast ==
- Carlos Monzón as El Macho/Kid El Macho/The Kid/The Vulture
- George Hilton as Hidalgo, the Duke
- Malisa Longo as Helen/Kelly
- Susana Giménez as Susana/Soledad
- Giuseppe Castellano as Ross
- Benito Stefanelli as Sheriff
- Bruno Di Luia as Gunner
- Vittorio Fanfoni as Angel

== See also ==
- List of Italian films of 1977
- List of Argentine films of 1977
