= A Black Ribbon for Deborah =

- Italian: Un fiocco nero per Deborah
- Directed by: Marcello Andrei
- Screenplay by: Piero Regnoli; Marcello Andrei; Alvaro Fabrizio; Giuseppe Pulieri
- Story by: Piero Regnoli; Marcello Andrei; Alvaro Fabrizio; Giuseppe Pulieri
- Starring: Bradford Dillman; Marina Malfatti; Gig Young; Delia Boccardo
- Cinematography: Claudio Racca
- Edited by: Gianni Oppedisano
- Music by: Albert Verrecchia
- Production company: Paola Film s.r.l.
- Distributed by: Alpherat
- Release date: 26 September 1974 (Italy)
- Running time: 108 minutes
- Country: Italy
- Box office: ₤118.676 million

A Black Ribbon for Deborah (Italian: Un fiocco nero per Deborah) is a 1974 Italian horror film directed by Marcello Andrei, and starring Bradford Dillman, Marina Malfatti and Gig Young.

== Plot ==
The young Deborah has powers that allow her to predict the future. When she announces her pregnancy to her husband, he thinks she is crazy, just like the doctors who diagnose her with a hysterical pregnancy. Nothing could be further from the truth. In fact, Deborah is expecting a child who she will give birth to after a car accident that will cost her her life.

== Cast ==
- Bradford Dillman as Michel Lagrange
- Marina Malfatti as Deborah Lagrange
- Gig Young as Herman Ofenbauer
- Delia Boccardo as Mira
- Micaela Esdra as Elena
- Lucretia Love as Mrs. Ofenbauer
- Adriano Amidei Migliano as Albert Wener
- Luigi Casellato as Psychiatrist

== Production ==
Director Marcello Andrei and his co-writers originally conceived the film with an original idea of a dying woman passing the child she is bearing to another person. Giuseppe Pulieri stated that the script he worked on was ruined by a producer's attempt to exploit the film as part of the "demonic possession" cycle of films. Pulieri stated that "The script stayed ten years in the drawer, I even pestered Raymond Stross into making it, to no avail ... they altered the story, the in all the usual bullshit: the witches, the sorcerer, the special effects..."

The film began shooting in Rome on May 13, 1974.

José Ferrer was originally cast as Ofenbauer, but was replaced by Gig Young shortly before filming began.

== Release ==
A Black Ribbon for Deborah was distributed theatrically in Italy by Alpherat on 26 September 1974. The film grossed a total of 118,676,000 Italian lire domestically. Italian film historian Roberto Curti described the film as passing "almost unnoticed on its theatrical release".

The film was first released on home video in the United States and the United Kingdom in the early 1980s. It was released in the United Kingdom as The Torment.

== Reception ==
AllMovie defines the film a "low-wattage horror piece".

== Footnotes ==
=== References ===
- Curti, Roberto (2017). Italian Gothic Horror Films, 1970–1979. McFarland. ISBN 978-1476629605.
