= Patrick Still Lives =

- Directed by: Mario Landi
- Written by: Piero Regnoli
- Produced by: Gabriele Crisanti
- Starring: Sacha Pitoëff; Gianni Dei; Mariangela Giordano; Carmen Russo; Franco Silva
- Cinematography: Franco Villa
- Edited by: Mario Salvatori
- Music by: Berto Pisano
- Distributed by: Variety Distribution
- Release date: 15 May 1980
- Running time: 92 minutes
- Country: Italy
- Language: Italian

Patrick Still Lives (Italian: Patrick vive ancora, also known as Patrick Is Still Alive) is a 1980 Italian horror film directed by Mario Landi, and his last film. It is a low-budget unauthorized sequel of the Australian horror Patrick from two years earlier. It is known primarily for its graphic scenes of sex and gore, notably an extremely graphic scene of rape, which ended with the victim disembowelled with a poker. The film was shot in the same house later used as main set in Burial Ground: The Nights of Terror.

== Plot ==
The film follows events surrounding a young boy named Patrick sent into a coma after a roadside accident and who develops psychic powers with which he is free to commit brutal murders.

== Cast ==
- Sacha Pitoëff as Dr. Herschel
- Gianni Dei as Patrick Herschel
- Mariangela Giordano as Stella Randolph
- Carmen Russo as Sheryl Cough
- Paolo Giusti as Mr. Davis
- Franco Silva as Lyndon Cough
- Andrea Belfiore as Lydia Grant (uncredited)
