= The Killers Are Our Guests =

- Directed by: Vincenzo Rigo
- Starring: Anthony Steffen
- Cinematography: Vincenzo Rigo
- Music by: Roberto Rizzo
- Release date: 1974
- Country: Italy
- Language: Italian

The Killers Are Our Guests (originally titled Gli assassini sono nostri ospiti) is a 1974 Italian crime-thriller film directed by Vincenzo Rigo.

== Plot ==
Franco, Eliana and Mario rob a jewelry store in Milan and take flight. Franco, however, was injured in the shootout with the police, so the group decides to temporarily take refuge in the secluded villa of Dr. Malerba. Meanwhile, they wait the arrival of Eddy, the head of the organization, the tension in the house steadily rises.

== Cast ==
- Anthony Steffen as Guido Malerba
- Margaret Lee as Eliana
- Luigi Pistilli as Police Commissioner Di Stefano
- Gianni Dei as Franco
- Livia Cerini as Mara Malerba
- Giuseppe Castellano as Mario
- Sandro Pizzocchero as Eddy
