= Mario Landi =

Italian director (1920–1992)

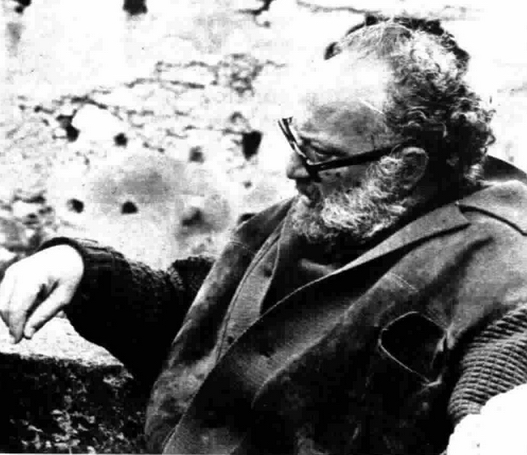
- Landi in 1973
- Born: 12 October 1920; Messina, Italy
- Died: 18 March 1992 (aged 71); Rome, Italy
- Occupation: Director
- Known for: Le inchieste del commissario Maigret

Mario Landi (12 October 1920 – 18 March 1992) was an Italian director known for his giallo movies such as Giallo a Venezia and his television series Le inchieste del commissario Maigret.

== Life and career ==
Born on 12 October 1920, in Messina, Landi attended the National Academy of Dramatic Arts in Rome, graduating in direction in 1944. He began his career in theater, working with the best actors of his time, in particular being one of the most active protagonists of the "Diogene" cultural circle in Milan, a reference point for the Italian theater in the 1950s. He made his debut as a film director in 1950, with the musical film Canzoni per le strade, but soon his interests shifted to the new medium of his era, the television; he is regarded as a pioneer of Italian television, for which he worked since 1952, when RAI started experimental broadcasting before starting the regular TV service. From 1955 to 1979, he directed a very large number of television movies and series, occasionally directing a few variety shows, including an edition of Canzonissima. He was less active in cinema, in which he sporadically directed a number of low-profile genre films.

== Reception ==
The films of Mario Landi were not well received. Paolo Mereghetti, author of Il Mereghetti, wrote of Maigret a Pigalle: "the direction is slovenly", while of Giallo a Venezia he wrote that it:

"deserves (or perhaps does not deserve) to be remembered as one of the most idiotic Italian thrillers ever made, a collage of soft-porn sequences and dismemberments of rare brutality that fall into the void, in a childish attempt to astonish."

== Filmography ==
=== As actor ===
- Howlers in the Dock (1960, as Il regista Lando)
- Cry of a Prostitute (1974, as Don Turi Scannapieco)

=== As director ===
- Songs in the Streets (1950)
- Siamo tutti Milanesi (1953)
- Così è (se vi pare) (1954)
- Andrea Chénier (1955)
- Cime tempestose (1956, TV Mini-Series)
- All'insegna delle sorelle Kadar (1957)
- Canzonissima (1958, TV series)
- Canne al vento (1958)
- Il povero fornaretto di Venezia (1959)
- Il romanzo di un maestro (1959, TV Mini-Series)
- Lo schiavo impazzito (1960)
- Ragazza mia (1960, TV Mini-Series)
- Racconti dell'Italia di ieri - Un episodio dell'anno della fame (1961)
- Il piacere dell'onestà (1961)
- Racconti dell'Italia di oggi - Una lapide in Via Mazzini (1962)
- Ritorna il tenente Sheridan (1963, TV series, 6 episodes)
- Giacobbe ed Esau (1963)
- Le inchieste del commissario Maigret (1964-1972, TV series, 16 episodes)
- Maigret a Pigalle (1967)
- Questi nostri figli (1967, TV Mini-Series, 4 episodes)
- Dossier Mata Hari (1967, TV Mini-Series, 4 episodes)
- I racconti del maresciallo (1968, TV series, 6 episodes)
- Dal tuo al mio (1969)
- Un mese in campagna (1970)
- Nessuno deve sapere (1972, TV Mini-Series, 4 episodes)
- Serata al gatto nero (1973, TV Mini-Series, 2 episodes)
- Batton Story (1976)
- L'altro Simenon (1979, TV Series)
- Accadde ad Ankara (1979, TV Mini-Series)
- La vedova e il piedipiatti (1979, TV Mini-Series, 6 episodes)
- Supersexymarket (1979)
- Giallo a Venezia (1979)
- Il viziaccio (1980)
- Patrick Still Lives (1980)

=== As Screenwriter ===
- The Two Sergeants (1951)
