= Ernesto Calindri =

Italian actor (1909–1999)

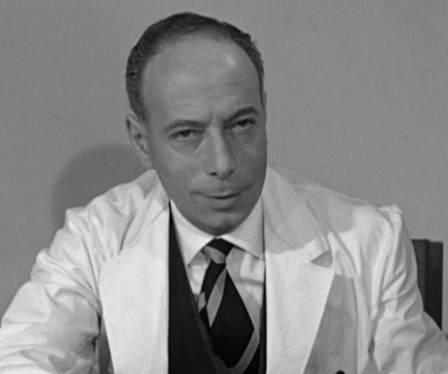
- Born: 5 February 1909; Certaldo, Italy
- Died: 9 June 1999 (aged 90); Milan, Italy
- Occupation: Actor
- Years active: 1938–1989

Ernesto Calindri (5 February 1909 – 9 June 1999) was an Italian theater and film actor. He appeared in 40 films between 1938 and 1989. He is often remembered in Italy for a series of TV commercials for a well-known brand of Italian artichoke-based bitter liqueur, Cynar, with the catchphrase "Contro il logorio della vita moderna" ("Assuaging the wear-and-tear of modern life") which showed him sitting at a café table surrounded by traffic drinking and reading the paper in relaxed fashion.

== Selected filmography ==
- Golden Arrow (1935)
- It Always Ends That Way (1939)
- I'll Always Love You (1943)
- The Children Are Watching Us (1944)
- A Night of Fame (1949)
- Songs in the Streets (1950)
- L'ultimo amante (1955)
- The Most Wonderful Moment (1957)
- Policarpo (1959)
- Truffa 62(1961)
- Le massaggiatrici (1962) as Parodi
