= Sammy Barbot =

French singer, ballet dancer and television presenter

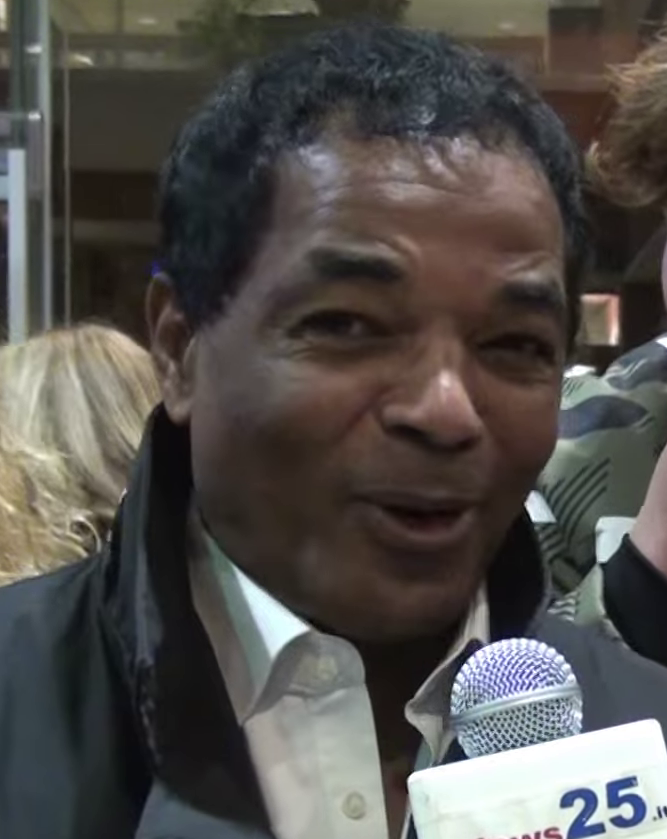
- Barbot in 2015
- Born: Jacques Édouard Barbot; September 1, 1954 (age 71); Le Lamentin, Martinique, France
- Occupation: Singer

Jacques Édouard Barbot (born 1954), known as Sammy Barbot, is a French entertainer, singer, and television presenter, mainly active in Italy.

== Life and career ==
Born in Martinique, at young age Barbot moved to Paris with his family. In the early 1970s he started singing in restaurants and clubs, and he eventually took part to the French version of the stage musical Hair.

In 1975 Barbot appeared in the film Hallucination Strip and performed the film's opening song "We've Got A Lord". The song appeared on the film's original soundtrack.

Noted by two RAI Italian television writers, in 1977 he moved to Italy to host the musical show Piccolo Slam, of which he also sang the two theme songs. In 1979 he hosted Popcorn, a successful Canale 5 show he had also ideated.

In 1981 Barbot got his major hit, "Aria di casa mia", the opening theme song of his TV show Happy Circus, which peaked at the fifth place on the Italian hit parade.

In the following years he continued his musical and television activities, slowing his activities in the second half of the 1980s.

== Personal life ==
Barbot is a Jehovah's Witness. He resides in Rome, and has two children, Michel and Alissia.

== Discography ==
Singles

- 1969 - L'amore è blu/L'ultimo
- 1973 - Amico/Girl You 'R' Right
- 1975 - Mark/So much love
- 1976 - Season of assassins/Gang leader
- 1976 - Signor Robinson/L'isola di Robinson
- 1977 - El Macho/Macho's slams
- 1977 - Non legarti a me/Disco slam
- 1977 - Toccami/Piccolo slam
- 1978 - New Mexico/Take my music
- 1980 - California/California (versione strumentale)
- 1981 - Aria di casa/Liberazion
- 1982 - Forza campione (parte 1)/Forza campione (parte 2)
- 1983 - Vita semplice/Donna vieni via
- 1983 - Non sarai più sola/Di' di no
- 1984 - Let The Music Play/Love Sensation
- 1984 - Groovy/Groovy (remix)
- 1985 - Music, harmony and rhythm medley with Brazilian Rhyme
- 1986 - Tempo d'estate/Tempo d'estate (versione strumentale)
- 2007 - Rainbow Imagine

Album

- 1973 - Un testo, una musica (BBB, BSLB 0009)
- 1977 - Sammy! (Dischi Ricordi, SMRL 6215)
- 1983 - Barbot L.P. (WEA Italiana)
