= Giallo a Venezia =

- Directed by: Mario Landi
- Written by: Aldo Serio
- Produced by: Gabriele Crisanti
- Starring: Leonora Fani
- Cinematography: Franco Villa
- Edited by: Mario Salvatori
- Music by: Berto Pisano
- Distributed by: Variety Distribution
- Release date: 31 December 1979
- Running time: 91 minutes
- Country: Italy
- Language: Italian

Giallo a Venezia (Giallo in Venice) is a 1979 Italian giallo film directed by Mario Landi. The film released on December 31, 1979, in Italy and starred Leonora Fani. It is known primarily for its extremely graphic scenes of sex and gore, including a woman's leg being slowly sawed off with a long knife. There is also a Brazilian VHS version containing XXX scenes under the title Pesadelo em Veneza.

== Synopsis ==
The film follows a detective investigating the murder of a married couple involving a sexually abusive cocaine addict husband while, at the same time, an unknown killer commits multiple grisly murders.

== Cast ==
- Leonora Fani as Flavia
- Jeff Blynn as Angelo De Paul
- Gianni Dei as Fabio
- Michele Renzullo as Andrea Caron
- Eolo Capritti as Maestrin
- Vassili Karis as Bruno Nielsen (credited as Vassili Karamesinis)
- Giancarlo Del Duca as Alberto, the coroner
- Mariangela Giordano as Marzia (credited as Maria Angela Giordan)

== Production ==
While filming the scene in which Mariangela Giordano was tied to a kitchen table, the telephone cords were put on her wrists and ankles so tight that they cut into her flesh. She had visible marks on those places for three months.

== Reception ==
Moviefone gave a mixed review for the film, saying that it "is one worth seeing for fans of the subgenre" but that overall it was "simply not on par with most of the Italian greats". In the book Italian Horror Film Directors one critic noted that Giallo a Venezia is a "perfect example of how a filmmaker can go too far in his quest to achieve the perfect synthesis of horror and repulsion."

Paolo Mereghetti wrote that it:

"deserves (or perhaps does not deserve) to be remembered as one of the most idiotic Italian thrillers ever made, a collage of soft-porn sequences and dismemberments of rare brutality that fall into the void, in a childish attempt to astonish."

Horror author Brandon Halsey wrote:

"While Giallo a Venezia may lack the social commentary of Lucio Fulci or the swooping camera-work and visual styling of Dario Argento, it is still a giallo that can comfortably stand on merits of its own."
