= Confessions of a Frustrated Housewife =

1976 film

- Film poster
- Directed by: Andrea Bianchi
- Written by: Andrea Bianchi; Massimo Felisatti
- Produced by: Enzo Doria
- Starring: Carroll Baker; Adolfo Celi
- Cinematography: Franco Delli Colli; Franco Villa
- Edited by: Mariano Arditi
- Music by: Guido & Maurizio De Angelis
- Release date: 4 August 1976
- Running time: 93 minutes
- Country: Italy
- Language: Italian

Confessions of a Frustrated Housewife (Italian: La moglie di mio padre) is a 1976 Italian drama film directed by Andrea Bianchi and starring Carroll Baker.

== Cast ==
- Carroll Baker as Laura
- Adolfo Celi as Antonio Lenzini
- Cesare Barro as Claudio
- Luigi Pistilli as Carlo
- Gabriella Giorgelli as Prostitute
- Dada Gallotti as Patrizia's friend
- Caterina Barbero as Gabriella
- Carla Spessato as Magda
- Femi Benussi as Patrizia
- Jenny Tamburi as Diana

== See also ==
- List of Italian films of 1976
