= Elisa Mainardi =

Italian stage, film, and television actress (1930–2016)

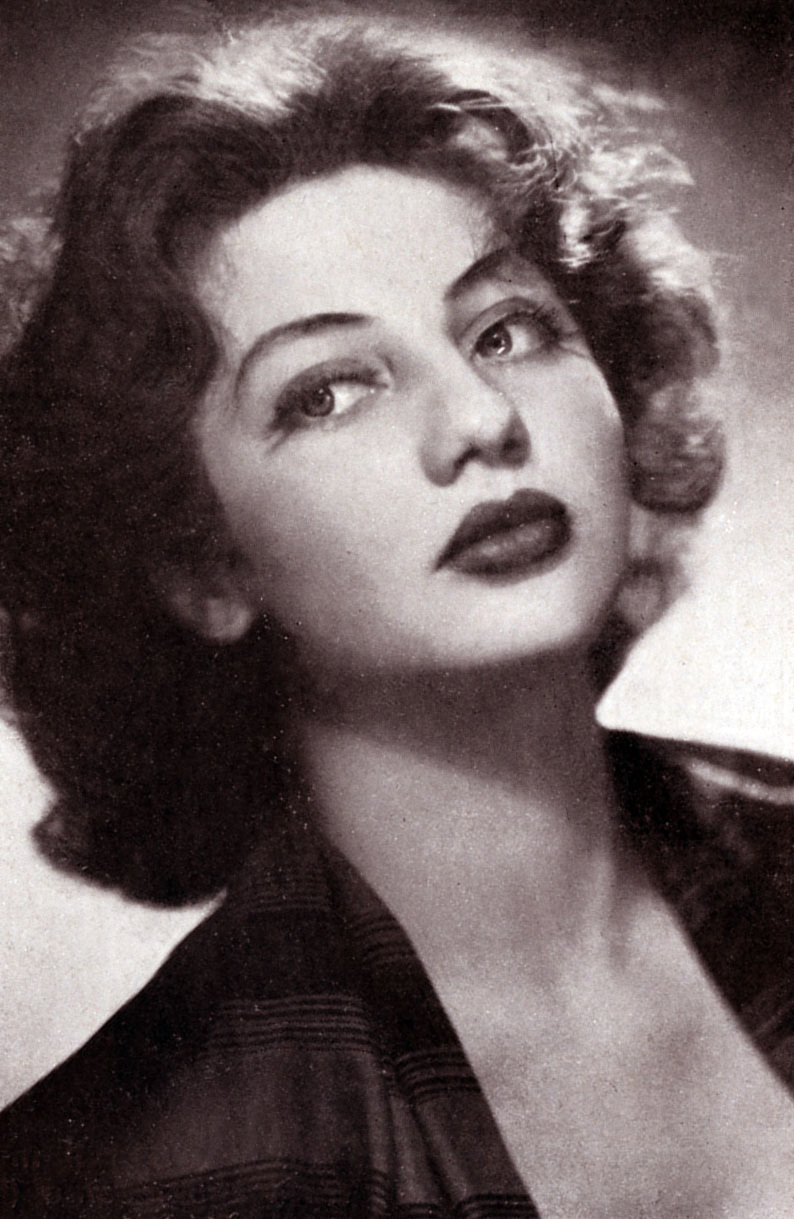
- Born: 27 July 1930; Rome, Kingdom of Italy
- Died: 8 May 2016 (aged 85); Rome, Italy
- Occupation: Actress
- Years active: 1953–1994

Elisa Mainardi (27 July 1930 – 8 May 2016) was an Italian stage, film, and television actress.

== Life and career ==
Born in Rome, Mainardi studied at the acting school of Peter Sharoff, and debuted on stage in 1956, in Ottavio Spadaro's Corruzione a palazzo di giustizia alongside Salvo Randone, immediately receiving critical acclaim for her performance. Shortly after, she became lead actress in Il sorriso della Gioconda directed by Ernesto Grassi and in La penna directed by Lucio Chiavarelli, and the absolute protagonist in Luciano Salce's Colombe di Anouilh. Her stage works include main roles in works directed by Luchino Visconti, Giorgio De Lullo, Silverio Blasi and Alessandro Fersen. Mainardi was also active on television and in films, in which she worked several times with Federico Fellini.

== Selected filmography ==
- La Vendetta (1962)
- Hercules and the Black Pirates (1964)
- I figli del leopardo (1965)
- Night of Violence (1965)
- Fellini Satyricon (1969)
- Zenabel (1969)
- Aretino's Stories of the Three Lustful Daughters (1972)
- Women in Cell Block 7 (1972)
- Eye in the Labyrinth (1972)
- Roma (1972)
- La nottata (1975)
- Fellini's Casanova (1976)
- House of Pleasure for Women (1976)
- Stato interessante (1977)
- The Iron Commissioner (1978)
- Café Express (1980)
- Il Marchese del Grillo (1981)
- Uno contro l'altro, praticamente amici (1981)
- Talcum Powder (1982)
- And the Ship Sails On (1983)
- Dark Illness (1990)
