= Mario Bianchi =

Italian film director (1939–2022)

- Born: 7 January 1939; Rome, Italy
- Died: April 2022 (aged 83)
- Occupations: Film director, producer, screenwriter

Mario Bianchi (7 January 1939 – April 2022) was an Italian film director and screenwriter. Bianchi directed several features including sexploitation and pornographic films. He spent the majority of the 1990s directing pornography in Italy under the names Nicholas Moore, Tony Yanker and Martin White.

== Filmography ==
Title	Year	Credited as			Notes	Ref(s)
Title	Year	Director	Writer	Other	Notes	Ref(s)
Gangster's Law	1969			Yes	Assistant director	
The Magnificent Robin Hood	1970			Yes	Assistant director	
Eye of the Spider	1971			Yes	Assistant director	
Tragic Ceremony	1972		Yes			
La banda Vallanzasca	1977	Yes	Yes	Yes	Story author, actor as Killer	
La bravata	1977			Yes	Actor as Piero	
Napoli:i 5 della squadra speciale	1978	Yes	Yes	Yes	Story author, actor as Mario	
Don't Trust the Mafia	1979	Yes		Yes	Actor as one of Jacomino's henchmen	
Snow White and the 7 Wise Men	1982	Yes				
Satan's Baby Doll	1982	Yes				
