= Massimo Scaglione =

Italian television director, writer and politician

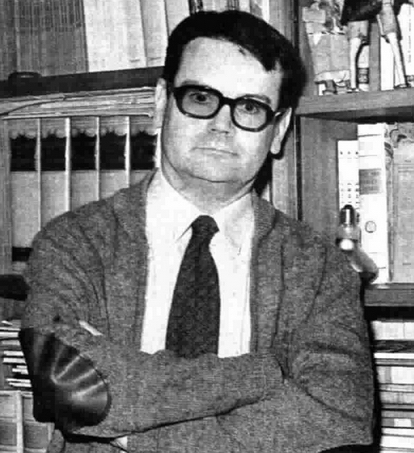
- Born: 19 September 1931; Garessio, Italy
- Died: 8 October 2015 (aged 84); Turin, Italy
- Occupation: Director

Massimo Scaglione (19 September 1931 – 8 October 2015) was an Italian television director, writer and politician.

== Life and career ==
Born in Garessio, Cuneo, Scaglione graduated in Modern Literature at the University of Turin. He was employed by RAI in 1955, and directed over 1,000 television programs, TV-movies, series and stage works. He wrote several essays on the history of the theater, directed a drama school, the "Centro di Formazione Teatro delle Dieci", and held theatre courses at the DAMS department of University of Turin. He was among the founders of the right wing party Lega Nord Piemont and was elected senator for two legislatures.

He was married to the dancer Loredana Furno.
