= Burial Ground (film) =

- American poster for Burial Ground
- Directed by: Andrea Bianchi
- Written by: Piero Regnoli
- Produced by: Gabriele Crisanti
- Starring: Karin Well; Gianluigi Chirizzi; Simone Mattioli; Antonella Antinori; Roberto Caporali; Claudio Zucchet; Pietro Barzocchini; Anna Valente; Benito Barbieri; Mariangela Giordano
- Cinematography: Gianfranco Maioletti
- Music by: Elsio Mancuso; Burt Rexon
- Distributed by: Variety Distribution
- Release date: 1981
- Running time: 85 min
- Language: Italian (English dub)

Burial Ground (original title: Le notti del terrore, also known as Nights of Terror, Zombi Horror, The Zombie Dead) is an Italian exploitation zombie movie directed by Andrea Bianchi. It is one of several films released under the alternative title of Zombie 3.

== Plot ==
Professor Ayers (Benito Barbieri) is studying an ancient crypt near a grand mansion he owns and accidentally unleashes an evil curse. The curse reanimates the dead buried in the area and the zombies devour the professor. Three jet-set couples Mark (Gianluigi Chirizzi) and Janet (Karin Well), James (Simone Mattioli) and Leslie (Antonella Antinori), George (Roberto Caporali) and Evelyn (Mariangela Giordano), who also have their son Michael (Pietro Barzocchini) with them, arrive at the mansion as they were invited by the professor.

Rotting corpses suddenly rise from graves all over the property and attack the guests. The power in the mansion begins acting strangely, going on and off, before it breaks all the light bulbs and stops working. George is killed in front of his wife and son when he tries to shoot the zombies. Evelyn manages to burn some of the zombies, giving her and Michael a chance to run. Janet is injured by a bear trap, but she is freed by Mark with the help of James and Leslie, who also kill some zombies who were getting close. Then the group meet up with Evelyn and Michael back at the mansion where they lock themselves up.

While everyone is boarding up windows and doors around the mansion, a maid Kathryn (Anna Valente) goes to check one of the windows upstairs. Zombies throw a large nail at her, which pins her hand to the side of the wall, then they decapitate her with a scythe. The zombies begin trying to find ways into the mansion as night falls. They start to display unusually high levels of intelligence, like using tools, axes, giant logs to slowly break through the doors and even climbing the pillars of the mansion to get up on the balconies. Leslie goes off alone to find bandages for her friend's injured leg. As she walks by a window, a zombie suddenly bursts through, grabbing her by the hair. She is impaled in the head with the shard of glass.

Zombies finally break into the mansion and attack everyone. Mark, James and a butler Nicholas (Claudio Zucchet) defend Janet who was being attacked. Meanwhile, Michael has become traumatized and Evelyn tries comforting him in another room. Michael however, starts showing he is sexually attracted to his mother and fondles her breasts while kissing her. A shocked Evelyn slaps him and he runs off. Michael soon encounters the zombified Leslie who attacks him. Evelyn finds him dead with Leslie eating him and she has a mental breakdown, which she retaliates by smashing Leslie's head.

The group decide to let the zombies inside the house, reasoning that they can distract them while they escape. Nicholas is killed by the zombified professor, while the other remaining survivors escape from the mansion and hide out in an unused building on the property until morning. They find a nearby monastery, but discover that all the monks have become zombies. James is ambushed by zombies and killed, then turns into a zombie when the others leave.

The zombie monks chase the rest of the survivors to a workshop in the middle of the forest, where they encounter the zombified Michael. Evelyn offers Michael to suckle at her breast and he bites off her nipple, killing her. Mark and Janet are cornered by the zombies just as a zombified George and James show up. The zombies grab Mark and during the struggle they turn on an electric saw to kill him with it. Janet screams in terror as the zombies get closer to her and they put their hands on her. The misspelled "Profecy of the Black Spider" then appears on the screen ("The Earth shall tremble, graves shall open...they shall come among the living as messengers of death, and there shall be the nights (sic) of terror") as the film ends.

== Cast ==
- Karin Well as Janet
- Gianluigi Chirizzi as Mark (credited as Gian Luigi Chirizzi)
- Simone Mattioli as James
- Antonella Antinori as Leslie (credited as Antonietta Antinori)
- Roberto Caporali as George
- Claudio Zucchet as Nicholas (credited as Cluadio Zucchett)
- Pietro Barzocchini as Michael (credited as Peter Bark)
- Anna Valente as Kathryn
- Benito Barbieri as Professor Ayers (credited as Renato Barbieri)
- Mariangela Giordano as Evelyn (credited as Maria Angela Giordan)

== Production ==
The film was shot in four weeks, at the Villa Parisi in Frascati, about 20 kilometres (12 mi) from Rome. A large portion of the film's budget was used on the special effects by Gino De Rossi and Rosario Prestopino.

The 25-year-old Pietro Barzocchini, credited as Peter Bark, was cast as the young boy Michael to circumvent Italian laws restricting the use of children in film scenes featuring sexual and violent content.

== Release ==
Burial Ground: Nights of Terror was given a belated limited release theatrically in the United States by the Film Concept Group in 1985. The film grossed $542,501. It was subsequently released on VHS by Vestron Video under the alternative title of Burial Ground. In the UK the film was released on VHS, on the Apex label, in 1986 as Nights of Terror with over 13 minutes of BBFC and distributor cuts. The film was finally released uncut in the UK in 2002 by low budget distributor VIPCO under the title The Zombie Dead, and given its first high definition release by 88 Films in 2016.

The film was released on DVD in the U.S in September 2006 by Shriek Show. It is available separately or in a triple feature package Zombie Pack, Vol. 2, which includes Burial Ground: Nights of Terror, Flesheater, and Zombie Holocaust. In June 2011, Shriek Show released it on Blu-ray. In 2024, the film was re-released on Blu-ray and for the first time in Ultra HD Blu-ray by Severin Films.

== Reception ==
Peter Dendle called it "a high-impact, sombre dirge that sustains tension mercilessly and wastes little time on plot and circumstance." Dendle states that though it is often dismissed as a cheap clone of Zombi 2, Burial Ground improves on that film's strong points. Marc Patterson of Brutal as Hell rated the film 2/5 stars and called it "uninteresting and dismissible." Sara Castillo of Fearnet stated that the film is "notable for its near total lack of plot and bloody zombie breast-feeding scene". Danny Shipka stated that the film was partially responsible for destroying the zombie film fad with its bad effects, acting, and writing. Peter Normanton rated the film 5/5 stars and called the pace "breathtaking". Normanton wrote that the film sacrifices plot for creative death scenes, but the low budget can cause the special effects to look "a tad farcical". Glenn Kay wrote that "there isn't one iota of suspense or terror" and that the film is dull and pedestrian.
