= Giallo club. Invito al poliziesco =

- Starring: Ubaldo Lay
- Country of origin: Italy
- No. of seasons: 4

Original release
- Network: Programma Nazionale
- Release: 1959 – 1961

Giallo club. Invito al poliziesco is an Italian television series.

== See also ==
- List of Italian television series
