= Piero Regnoli =

Italian screenwriter

- Born: 1921
- Died: 2001 (aged 79–80); Rome, Italy
- Other name: Dean Craig
- Occupations: Screenwriter, film director
- Years active: 1953–1994

Piero Regnoli (1921–2001) was an Italian screenwriter and film director.

== Career ==
Born in 1921, Regnoli worked in the film industry between 1953 and 1991 where he wrote over 110 screenplays and directed 11 films. Regnoli's work ranged from sword-and-sandal films, westerns, horror and sexy comedies. His final film where he was officially credited as a director was La principessa sul pisello in 1976. Regnoli did uncredited direction on the 1986 melodrama Giuro che ti amo starring Nino D'Angelo.

Regnoli was also employed as the film critic for the Vatican's daily newspaper L'Osservatore Romano. Regnoli died in 2001.

== Style ==
Piero Regnoli's work as writer often dealt with themes of eroticism, such as in Brunello Rondi's Tecnica di un amore (1973), Roberto Bianchi Montero's Caligula's Hot Nights (1977) and Mario Bianchi's Satan's Baby Doll (1983). When Regnoli worked as a director, his work still contained these themes but was often toned down.

== Selected filmography ==
Note: The films listed as N/A are not necessarily chronological.

Title	Year	Credited as				Notes	Ref(s)
Title	Year	Director	Screenplay	Story	Other	Notes	Ref(s)
It's Never Too Late	1953		Yes				
I Vampiri	1957		Yes	Yes	Yes	Acting role as Mr. Bourgeois; Assistant director	
Anche l'inferno trema	—N/a	Yes					
The Playgirls and the Vampire	1960	Yes	Yes	Yes			
I'll See You in Hell	—N/a	Yes	Yes				
Caribbean Hawk	1962	Yes	Yes				
The Defeat of the Barbarians	1962	Yes					
Maciste in King Solomon's Mines	1964	Yes	Yes				
The Third Eye	1966		Yes				
The Hills Run Red	1966		Yes	Yes			
Navajo Joe	1966		Yes				
The Seven Red Berets	1969		Yes				
Gangster's Law	1969		Yes				
Ivanhoe, the Norman Swordsman	1971		Yes				
And They Smelled the Strange, Exciting, Dangerous Scent of Dollars	1973		Yes				
White Fang	1973		Yes				
Cry of a Prostitute	1974		Yes				
A Black Ribbon for Deborah	1974		Yes	Yes			
Season for Assassins	1975		Yes	Yes			
La principessa sul pisello	1976	Yes	Yes	Yes			
Honor and "Guapparia"	1977		Yes				
Malabimba – The Malicious Whore	1978		Yes				
Naples ... the Camorra Defies, the City Replies	1979		Yes				
The New Godfathers	1979		Yes				
Your Life for My Son	1980		Yes				
Nightmare City	—N/a		Yes				
Patrick Still Lives	—N/a		Yes				
Burial Ground: The Nights of Terror	—N/a		Yes				
The Sword of the Barbarians	1982		Yes				
Gunan, King of the Barbarians	1982		Yes	Yes			
Satan's Baby Doll	1983		Yes				
The Bronx Executioner	—N/a		Yes				
Demonia	—N/a		Yes				
Voices from Beyond	—N/a		Yes				
The Smile of the Fox	—N/a		Yes				
Hot Laps	—N/a		Yes				
La ragazza di cortina	—N/a		Yes				
