= List of Italian films of 1974 =

A list of films produced in Italy in 1974 (see 1974 in film):

Italian films released in 1974
| Title | Director | Cast | Genre | Notes |
|---|---|---|---|---|
| Alla mia cara mamma nel giorno del suo compleanno | Luciano Salce | Paolo Villaggio, Lila Kedrova, Eleonora Giorgi | Commedia all'italiana | |
| Allonsanfàn | Paolo & Vittorio Taviani | Marcello Mastroianni, Lea Massari, Mimsy Farmer | Historical Drama | |
| All Screwed Up | Lina Wertmüller | Luigi Diberti, Lina Polito | comedy-drama | |
| Almost Human | Umberto Lenzi | Tomas Milian, Henry Silva | Poliziottesco | |
| Amore amaro | Florestano Vancini | Lisa Gastoni, Leonard Mann | romance-drama | |
| Amore libero - Free Love | Pier Ludovico Pavoni | Laura Gemser, Olga Bisera | erotic-adventure | |
| Anche gli angeli tirano di destro | Enzo Barboni | Giuliano Gemma, Ricky Bruch | action comedy | sequel of Even Angels Eat Beans |
| Anno uno | Roberto Rossellini | Luigi Vannucchi, Dominique Darel | biographical | |
| Ante Up | Paolo Nuzzi | Aldo Maccione, Agostina Belli, Andréa Ferréol | comedy | Entered into the 25th Berlin International Film Festival |
| The Antichrist | Alberto De Martino | Carla Gravina, Mel Ferrer, Arthur Kennedy, Alida Valli | horror | |
| Appassionata | Gianluigi Calderone | Gabriele Ferzetti, Ornella Muti, Eleonora Giorgi, Valentina Cortese | erotic drama | |
| Arabian Nights (Il fiore delle mille e una notte) | Pier Paolo Pasolini | Franco Merli, Ninetto Davoli | anthology comedy | |
| L'arbitro | Luigi Filippo D'Amico | Lando Buzzanca, Joan Collins | comedy | |
| Around the World with Peynet's Lovers | Cesare Perfetto | - | animation | |
| The Balloon Vendor | Ovidio G. Assonitis | Lee J. Cobb, Adolfo Celi, James Whitmore | drama | |
| The Beast | Sergio Corbucci | Giancarlo Giannini, Michel Constantin | Commedia all'italiana | |
| La bellissima estate | Sergio Martino | Senta Berger, John Richardson, Alessandro Cocco, Lino Toffolo | drama | |
| Beyond the Door (Chi sei?) | Ovidio G. Assonitis | Juliet Mills, Gabriele Lavia, Richard Johnson | horror | |
| A Black Ribbon for Deborah | Marcello Andrei | Bradford Dillman, Marina Malfatti, Gig Young | horror | |
| Blood for Dracula | Paul Morrissey | Udo Kier, Joe Dallesandro, Vittorio De Sica | Horror | Italian-French co-production |
| Blood River | Gianfranco Baldanello | Fabio Testi, John Ireland, Rosalba Neri | Western | Italian-Spanish co-production |
| The Body | Luigi Scattini | Zeudi Araya, Enrico Maria Salerno, Carroll Baker | erotic | |
| Bread and Chocolate (Pane e cioccolata) | Franco Brusati | Nino Manfredi, Johnny Dorelli, Anna Karina | Commedia all'italiana | David di Donatello winner. Berlin Award. New York Film Critics Circle Awards won |
| Brief Encounter | Alan Bridges | Sophia Loren, Richard Burton | drama | British-Italian co-production |
| Carambola! | Ferdinando Baldi | Antonio Cantafora, Paul L. Smith, Horst Frank | Western | |
| Catene | Silvio Amadio | Maurizio Merli, Rosemary Dexter | romance-drama | remake of Catene (1949 film) |
| Challenge to White Fang | Lucio Fulci | Franco Nero, Renato Cestiè, Virna Lisi | Western | Italian-French-German co-production |
| Che matti… ragazzi!!! | Ernst Hofbauer | | Italian-German-Spain co-production | |
| City Under Siege | Romolo Guerrieri | Enrico Maria Salerno, Françoise Fabian | Crime | |
| Claretta and Ben | Gian Luigi Polidoro | Ugo Tognazzi, Bernadette Lafont | Commedia all'italiana | |
| Commissariato di notturna | Guido Leoni | Rosanna Schiaffino, Gastone Moschin | crime-comedy | |
| Conversation Piece (Gruppo di famiglia in un interno) | Luchino Visconti | Burt Lancaster, Helmut Berger, Silvana Mangano | Drama | David di Donatello winner. Spoken in English |
| Convoy of Women | Pierre Chevalier | Anna Gladysek, Marianne Remont, Paul Muller | Western | French-Italian co-production |
| Court Martial | Roberto Mauri | Vassili Karamessinis, Craig Hill, Hunt Powers | Western | |
| The Crazy Bunch | Giuliano Carnimeo | George Hilton, Cris Huerta, Antonio Monselesan | Western | |
| Crazy Joe | Carlo Lizzani | Peter Boyle, Paula Prentiss, Fred Williamson | —N/a | Italian-American co-production |
| Cry of a Prostitute | Andrea Bianchi | Henry Silva, Barbara Bouchet, Fausto Tozzi | —N/a | |
| The Devil Is a Woman (Il sorriso del grande tentatore) | Damiano Damiani | Glenda Jackson, Claudio Cassinelli, Lisa Harrow, Adolfo Celi | Drama | |
| Il domestico | Luigi Filippo D'Amico | Lando Buzzanca, Martine Brochard | comedy | |
| Don't Touch the White Woman | Marco Ferreri | Marcello Mastroianni, Catherine Deneuve, Michel Piccoli | Western | French-Italian co-production |
| The Eerie Midnight Horror Show | Mario Gariazzo | Stella Carnacina, Chris Avram | Horror | |
| Emergency Squad | Stelvio Massi | Tomas Milian, Gastone Moschin | Poliziottesco | |
| Eyeball | Umberto Lenzi | Martine Brochard, John Richardson | Giallo | |
| Farfallon | Mauro Bolognini | Franco and Ciccio | comedy | parody of Papillon |
| I figli di nessuno | Bruno Gaburro | Gabriele Tinti, Sara Sperati | romance-drama | remake of I figli di nessuno (1951 film) |
| Il figlio della sepolta viva | Luciano Ercoli | Fred Robsahm, Eva Czemerys | drama | |
| The First Time on the Grass | Gianluigi Calderone | Anne Heywood, Mark Lester, Claudio Cassinelli, Monica Guerritore | drama | Entered into the 25th Berlin International Film Festival |
| Five Women for the Killer | Stelvio Massi | Francis Matthews, Giorgio Albertazzi | giallo | |
| Flavia the Heretic | Gianfranco Mingozzi | Florinda Bolkan, María Casares | nunsploitation | |
| Frankenstein's Castle of Freaks | —N/a | Rossano Brazzi, Edmund Purdom | horror | |
| The Gamecock | Pasquale Festa Campanile | Sydne Rome, Antonio Salines | comedy | |
| Giubbe rosse | Joe D'Amato | Fabio Testi, Lionel Stander | adventure | |
| La governante | Giovanni Grimaldi | Martine Brochard, Turi Ferro, Agostina Belli | comedy-drama | |
| I guappi | Pasquale Squitieri | Claudia Cardinale, Franco Nero, Fabio Testi | crime-drama | |
| The Hand That Feeds the Dead | Sergio Garrone | Klaus Kinski, Katia Christine, Ayhan Isik | Horror | Italian-Turkish co-production |
| Hold-Up | German Lorente | Frederick Stafford, Nathalie Delon, Marcel Bozzuffi | —N/a | Italian-Spanish-French co-production |
| How to Kill a Judge | Damiano Damiani | Franco Nero, Françoise Fabian | crime-thriller | |
| Identikit | Giuseppe Patroni Griffi | Elizabeth Taylor, Ian Bannen | drama | |
| I'll Take Her Like a Father | Alberto Lattuada | Gigi Proietti, Irene Papas, Teresa Ann Savoy | Commedia all'italiana | |
| Innocence and Desire | Massimo Dallamano | Edwige Fenech, Lionel Stander | Commedia sexy all'italiana | |
| Kidnap | Giovanni Fago | Henry Silva, Rada Rassimov, Philippe Leroy | Crime drama | |
| The Killer Reserved Nine Seats | Vincenzo Rigo | Anthony Steffen, Margaret Lee | —N/a | |
| The Killers Are Our Guests | Giuseppe Bennati | Rosanna Schiaffino, Janet Agren, Livia Cerini | —N/a | |
| Kiss | Mario Lanfranchi | Maurizio Bonuglia, Eleonora Giorgi, Martine Beswick | —N/a | |
| The Last Desperate Hours | Giorgio Stegani | Antonio Sabàto, Silvia Monti | —N/a | |
| Let Sleeping Corpses Lie | Jorge Grau | Cristina Galbó, Ray Lovelock | horror | |
| Lisa and the Devil | Mario Bava | Telly Savalas, Elke Sommer, Sylva Koscina | Horror | Italian-West German-Spanish co-production |
| Lover of the Monster | Sergio Garrone | Klaus Kinski | Horror | Italian-Turkish co-production |
| Lovers and Other Relatives | Salvatore Samperi | Laura Antonelli, Monica Guerritore | Commedia sexy all'italiana | |
| Mania | Renato Polselli | | —N/a | |
| Milarepa | Liliana Cavani | Lajos Balázsovits, Paolo Bonacelli | drama | Entered into the 1974 Cannes Film Festival |
| La minorenne | Silvio Amadio | Gloria Guida, Rosemary Dexter | Commedia sexy all'italiana | |
| Miracles Still Happen | Giuseppe Maria Scotese | Susan Penhaligon, Paul Muller | Adventure | |
| Monika | Mario Imperoli | Gloria Guida, Colette Descombes | Commedia sexy all'italiana | |
| Morel's Invention | Emidio Greco | Anna Karina, Giulio Brogi, John Steiner | science fiction | |
| The Murri Affair | Mauro Bolognini | Giancarlo Giannini, Catherine Deneuve | Historical drama | French-Italian co-production David di Donatello Best Film winner |
| New Guinea: Island of Cannibals | Akira Ide | Prince Philip, Queen Elizabeth II | Documentary, Horror | Italian-Japanese co-production |
| The Night Porter | Liliana Cavani | Dirk Bogarde, Charlotte Rampling, Philippe Leroy | Erotic drama | |
| La nipote | Nello Rossati | Orchidea De Santis, Daniele Vargas | Commedia sexy all'italiana | |
| Nude for Satan | Luigi Batzella | Rita Calderoni, Stelio Candelli, Giuseppe Mattei | Horror | |
| Order to Kill | Josè Gutiérrez Maesso | Helmut Berger, Sydne Rome, Kevin McCarthy | crime | |
| Paolo il freddo | Ciccio Ingrassia | Franco Franchi, Ileana Rigano | comedy | |
| Patience Has a Limit, We Don't | Franco Ciferri | Peter Martell, Salvatore Borgese, Rita Di Lernia | Western | Italian-Spanish co-production |
| The Peaceful Age | Fabio Carpi | O. E. Hasse, Macha Méril | drama | |
| The Perfume of the Lady in Black | Francesco Barilli | Mimsy Farmer, Mario Scaccia | —N/a | |
| Piedino il questurino | Franco Lo Cascio | Franco Franchi, Irina Maleeva | Comedy | |
| Poker in Bed | Giuliano Carnimeo | Edwige Fenech, Carlo Giuffrè | Commedia sexy all'italiana | |
| Policewoman | Steno | Mariangela Melato, Renato Pozzetto | Commedia all'italiana | |
| The Prey (La preda) | Domenico Paolella | Zeudi Araya, Franco Gasparri, Micheline Presle | erotic drama | |
| Processo per direttissima | Lucio De Caro | Princess Ira von Fürstenberg, Michele Placido, Gabriele Ferzetti, Mario Adorf | poliziottesco | |
| The Profiteer (Il saprofita) | Sergio Nasca | Al Cliver, Valeria Moriconi, Janet Ågren, Leopoldo Trieste | drama | |
| A pugni nudi...per una triste esperienza in un carcere minorile | Marcello Zeani | Enzo Pulcrano, Femi Benussi, Vassili Karis | —N/a | |
| Puzzle | Duccio Tessari | Luc Merenda, Senta Berger | Giallo | |
| Return of Shanghai Joe | Adalberto Albertini | Klaus Kinski, Ernest Van-Mohr, Tommy Polgar | Western | Italian-German co-production |
| Run, Run, Joe! | Giuseppe Colizzi | Keith Carradine, Tom Skerritt | action-comedy | |
| Salvo D'Acquisto | Romolo Guerrieri | Massimo Ranieri, Enrico Maria Salerno | Biographical drama | |
| La sbandata | Salvatore Samperi | Domenico Modugno, Eleonora Giorgi | Commedia sexy all'italiana | |
| Scent of a Woman | Dino Risi | Vittorio Gassman, Agostina Belli | Commedia all'italiana | |
| The Sensual Man | Marco Vicario | Giancarlo Giannini, Rossana Podestà, Lionel Stander, Ornella Muti | Commedia all'italiana | |
| Shoot First, Die Later | Fernando Di Leo | Luc Merenda, Delia Boccardo, Richard Conte | —N/a | |
| Silence the Witness | Giuseppe Rosati | Bekim Fehmiu, Rosanna Schiaffino, Aldo Giuffrè | —N/a | |
| The Sinful Nuns of Saint Valentine | Sergio Grieco | Françoise Prévost, Jenny Tamburi | nunsploitation | |
| Somewhere Beyond Love (Delitto d'amore) | Luigi Comencini | Giuliano Gemma, Stefania Sandrelli | drama | Entered into the 1974 Cannes Film Festival |
| Sons of White Fang | Maurizio Pradeaux | Salvatore Borgese, Ileana Rigano, Piero Fabiani | Western | |
| Spasmo | Umberto Lenzi | Robert Hoffmann, Suzy Kendall, Ivan Rassimov | Giallo | |
| The Stranger and the Gunfighter | Antonio Margheriti | Lee Van Cleef, Lo Lieh, Patty Shepard | Western | Italian-Spanish-Hong Kong co-production |
| Street Law | Enzo G. Castellari | Franco Nero, Barbara Bach | Poliziottesco | |
| Super Stooges vs. the Wonder Women | Alfonso Brescia | Aldo Canti, Marc Hannibal, Hua Yueh | Comedy | Italian-Hong Kong co-production |
| La svergognata | Giuliano Biagetti | Philippe Leroy, Leonora Fani, Barbara Bouchet | erotic drama | |
| Swept Away (Travolti da un insolito destino nell'azzurro mare d'agosto) | Lina Wertmüller | Giancarlo Giannini, Mariangela Melato | Commedia all'italiana | Remake by Guy Ritchie in 2002 film |
| Three Tough Guys | Duccio Tessari | Lino Ventura, Isaac Hayes, Fred Williamson | —N/a | Italian-French co-production |
| Till Marriage Do Us Part | Luigi Comencini | Laura Antonelli, Alberto Lionello, Michele Placido, Jean Rochefort | commedia sexy all'italiana | Nominated to Golden Globe Award for Best Foreign Language Film |
| To Love Ophelia | Flavio Mogherini | Giovanna Ralli, Renato Pozzetto, Françoise Fabian | comedy | |
| Il trafficone | Bruno Corbucci | Carlo Giuffrè, Marilù Tolo, Tina Aumont, Lino Banfi | commedia sexy all'italiana | |
| Verdict | André Cayatte | Sophia Loren, Jean Gabin | Drama | |
| La via dei babbuini | Luigi Magni | Catherine Spaak, Pippo Franco, Lionel Stander | Commedia all'italiana | |
| Virilità | Paolo Cavara | Turi Ferro, Agostina Belli, Marc Porel | commedia sexy all'italiana | |
| The Voyage | Vittorio De Sica | Sophia Loren, Richard Burton | drama | De Sica's final film |
| Watch Out, We're Mad! | Marcello Fondato | Terence Hill, Bud Spencer | action comedy | |
| We All Loved Each Other So Much | Ettore Scola | Stefania Sandrelli, Vittorio Gassman, Nino Manfredi, Stefano Satta Flores, Aldo Fabrizi, Giovanna Ralli | Commedia all'italiana | |
| What Have They Done to Your Daughters? | Massimo Dallamano | Giovanna Ralli, Claudio Cassinelli, Mario Adorf | Giallo, poliziottesco | |
| Whisky and Ghosts | Antonio Margheriti | Alberto Terracina, Fernando Bilbao, Maribel Martín | Western | Italian-Spanish co-production |
| White Fang to the Rescue | Tonino Ricci | Maurizio Merli, Henry Silva | adventure | |

== Notes ==
=== References ===
- Curti, Roberto (2016). Diabolika: Supercriminals, Superheroes and the Comic Book Universe in Italian Cinema. Midnight Marquee Press. ISBN 978-1-936168-60-6.
- Curti, Roberto (2013). Italian Crime Filmography, 1968-1980. McFarland. ISBN 978-0786469765.
- Curti, Roberto (2017). Italian Gothic Horror Films, 1970–1979. McFarland. ISBN 978-1476629605.
- Grant, Kevin (2011). Any Gun Can Play. Fab Press. ISBN 9781903254615.
