= Giuseppe Addobbati =

Italian actor (1909–1986)

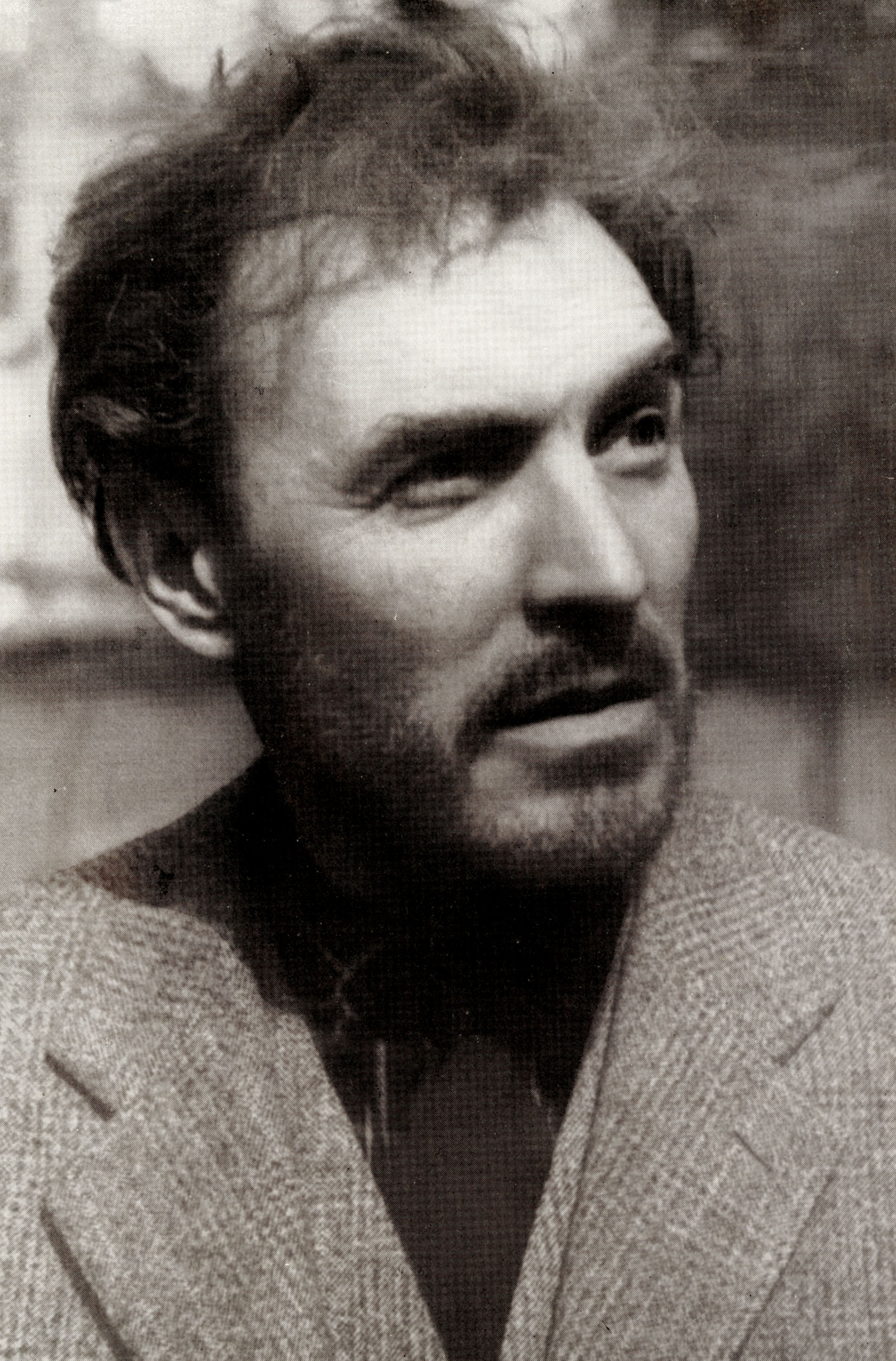
- Addobbati in 1954
- Born: 31 December 1909; Makarska, Kingdom of Dalmatia, Austria-Hungary
- Died: 4 January 1986 (aged 76); Rome, Italy
- Years active: 1937-1980

Giuseppe Addobbati (31 December 1909 – 4 January 1986) was an Italian film actor known for his roles in Spaghetti Western and action films in the 1960s and 1970s. He was often billed as John MacDouglas for films released to an American audience.

Addobbati was born in Makarska and later lived in Trieste. He made over 80 film appearances between 1937 and 1980 often as a police officer or law enforcer. He starred in films such as The Phantom of the Opera (1964), Blood For A Silver Dollar alongside Giuliano Gemma (Montgomery Wood) and in The Conformist (1970).

He also made several horror film appearances such as Nightmare Castle in 1965 alongside Barbara Steele, Paul Muller, Helga Liné, Laurence Clift and Rik Battaglia.

== Selected filmography ==
- Tredici uomini e un cannone (1936, dir. Giovacchino Forzano) as Uomo #9
- Condottieri (1937, dir. Luis Trenker) as Giovanni's Father
- Queen of the Scala (1937, dir. Camillo Mastrocinque e Guido Salvini) as Guido Vernieri
- Marcella (1937, dir. Guido Brignone)
- Giuseppe Verdi (1938, dir. Carmine Gallone)
- La mia canzone al vento (1939, dir. Guido Brignone)
- The Boarders at Saint-Cyr (1939, dir. Gennaro Righelli) as Un caddetto
- Sei bambine e il Perseo (1940, dir. Giovacchino Forzano) as Lattanzio Gorini
- Piccolo alpino (1940, dir. Oreste Biancoli) as L'aiuntante di campo di Lupo
- The King of England Will Not Pay (1941, dir. Giovacchino Forzano) as Tommaso Buondelmonti
- Violets in Their Hair (1942, dir. Carlo Ludovico Bragaglia) as Il direttore d'orchestra
- Alfa Tau! (1942, dir. Francesco De Robertis)
- Fedora (1942, dir. Camillo Mastrocinque)
- Giorno di nozze (1942, dir. Raffaello Matarazzo) as L'architetto (uncredited)
- The White Angel (1943, dir. Giulio Antamoro) as Il marchesino Arnaldo
- Incontri di notte (1943, dir. Nunzio Malasomma)
- Tutta la città canta (1945, dir. Riccardo Freda) as Il direttore
- La casa senza tempo (1945, dir. Andrea Forzano) as Il medico della clinica psichiatrica
- Imbarco a mezzanotte (1952, dir. Joseph Losey)
- Melodie immortali (1952, dir. Giacomo Gentilomo) as Uomo al opera
- Redenzione (1952, dir. Piero Caserini)
- Il mostro dell'isola (1954, dir. Roberto Bianchi Montero) as Direttore 'Sirena'
- The Country of the Campanelli (1954, dir. Jean Boyer) as Guardiamarina Tom
- Cento serenate (1954, dir. Anton Giulio Majano) (as John Douglas)
- La romana (1954, dir. Luigi Zampa)
- Ripudiata (1954, dir. Giorgio Walter Chili) (as John Douglas)
- Il padrone sono me (1955, dir. Franco Brusati)
- Il cigno (1956, dir. Charles Vidor) as Footman (uncredited)
- Guerra e pace (1956, dir. King Vidor) as House Servant (uncredited)
- Thundering Jets (1958, dir. Helmut Dantine) as Kurt Weber (as John Douglas)
- La Dolce Vita (1960, dir. Federico Fellini) (uncredited)
- Costantino il Grande (1960, dir. Lionello De Felice)
- Solimano il conquistatore (1961, dir. Vatroslav Mimica) (as John McDouglas)
- Ultimatum alla vita (1962, dir. Renato Polselli) as Berri (as John McDouglas)
- Marte, dio della guerra (1962, dir. Marcello Baldi)
- Tharus figlio di Attila (1962, dir. Roberto Bianchi Montero) as Kimg Bolem (as John McDouglas)
- Maciste contro lo sceicco (1962, dir. Domenico Paolella) as Duke of Malaga
- Venere imperiale (1962, dir. Jean Delannoy)
- Zorro e i tre moschettieri (1963, dir. Luigi Capuano)
- I tre implacabili (1963, dir. Joaquín Luis Romero Marchent) as Bardon (as John McDouglas)
- The Beast of Babylon Against the Son of Hercules (1963, dir. Siro Marcellini) as Licardio
- Il mostro dell'opera (1964, dir. Renato Polselli) as Stefano (as John McDouglas)
- Le tre spade di Zorro (1963, dir. Ricardo Blasco) as Marques de Santa Ana (as John McDouglas)
- Ursus nella terra di fuoco (1963, dir. Giorgio Simonelli) as Magistrate
- Maciste contro i Mongoli (1963, dir. Domenico Paolella) as The King (as John MacDouglas)
- Son of the Circus (1963, dir. Sergio Grieco)
- Giacobbe, l'uomo che lottò con Dio (1963, dir. Marcello Baldi) as Adamo - Adam (as John Douglas)
- Maciste, gladiatore di Sparta (1964, dir. Mario Caiano) as Marcellus
- Maciste nelle miniere di re Salomone (1964, dir. Piero Regnoli) as Namar
- Messalina vs. the Son of Hercules (1964, dir. Umberto Lenzi) as Lucilius (as John McDouglas)
- Il mostro dell'opera (1964, dir. Renato Polselli) as Stefano (as John McDouglas)
- Cavalca e uccidi (1964, dir. José Luis Borau) as Judge Stauffer (as John Mac Douglas)
- I pirati della Malesia (1964, dir. Umberto Lenzi) as Muda Hassin
- Una spada per l'impero (1964, dir. Sergio Grieco) as Pertinacius
- Il ranch degli spietati (1965, dir. Roberto Bianchi Montero) as Ken Hogg (as John McDouglas)
- La sfida degli implacabili (1965, dir. Ignacio F. Iquino) as Doctor (as John MacDouglas)
- Un dollaro bucato (1965, dir. Giorgio Ferroni) as Donaldson (as John MacDouglas)
- Amanti d'oltretomba (1965, dir. Mario Caiano) as Jonathan, the Butler (as John McDouglas)
- Colorado Charlie (1965, dir. Roberto Mauri) as Hogan, Sheriff of Little River (as John Mc Douglas)
- Degueyo (1966, dir. Giuseppe Vari) as Col. Clark (as John MacDouglas)
- Operazione paura (1966, dir. Mario Bava) as Innkeeper
- Tempo di massacro (1966, dir. Lucio Fulci) as Mr. Scott (as John M. Douglas)
- Congiura di spie (1967, dir. Edouard Molinaro) as Moranez
- L'ultimo killer (1967, dir. Giuseppe Vari) as Il padre di Ramón (as John McDouglas)
- Un uomo, un cavallo, una pistola (1967, dir. Luigi Vanzi) as Mr. Stanley
- Con lui cavalca la morte (1967, dir. Giuseppe Vari) as Geremia (as John Mc Douglas)
- Arabella (1967, dir. Mauro Bolognini)
- Un killer per sua maestà (1968, dir. Federico Chentrens) as Conte
- Un buco in fronte (1968, dir. Giuseppe Vari) as Prior (as Jhon Mac.Douglas)
- The Battle of El Alamein (1969, dir. Giorgio Ferroni) as Gen. Georg Stumme
- L'urlo dei giganti (1969, dir. León Klimovsky) as Gen. Moore (as John Douglas)
- Dio perdoni la mia pistola (1969, dir. Mario Gariazzo) as Sheriff Brennan
- Una sull'altra (1969, dir. Lucio Fulci) as Brent (as John Douglas)
- Colpo rovente (1970, dir. Piero Zuffi) (as John McDouglas)
- Il conformista (1970, dir. Bernardo Bertolucci) as Padre di Marcello
- Hranjenik (1970, dir. Vatroslav Mimica) as Profesor
- Appuntamento col disonore (1970, dir. Adriano Bolzoni) as Pappyanakis
- The Most Gentle Confessions (1971, dir. Edouard Molinaro) as Le maire (uncredited)
- Desert of Fire (1971, dir. Renzo Merusi) as Jean
- Blaise Pascal (1972, TV Movie, dir. Roberto Rossellini) as Étienne Pascal
- Baciamo le mani (1973, dir. Vittorio Schiraldi) as Nicola D'Amico
- L'età di Cosimo de Medici (1973, TV Mini-Series, dir. Roberto Rossellini)
- I Kiss the Hand (1973, dir. Vittorio Schiraldi) as Nicola D'Amico
- Mussolini ultimo atto (1974, dir. Carlo Lizzani) as Raffaele Cadorna
- Il portiere di notte (1974, dir. Liliana Cavani) as Stumm
- Assassinio al sole (1974, dir. Philippe Labro) as Docteur Morgan (as Giuseppe Addobati)
- L'ossessa (1974, dir. Mario Gariazzo) as Doctor
- Il gatto dagli occhi di giada (1977, dir. Antonio Bido) as Judge
- Corse a perdicuore (1980, dir. Mario Garriba) (final film role)
