= List of horror films of 1985 =

A list of horror films released in 1985.

Title	Director(s)	Cast	Country	Notes	Ref.
Amazonia: The Catherine Miles Story	Mario Gariazzo	Elvire Audray, Alma Vernon, Sara Fleszer	Italy	Alternative title(s): White Slave	
Attack of the Beast Creatures	Michael Stanley		United States		
The Bad Seed	Paul Wendkos	Lynn Redgrave, David Carradine, David Ogden Stiers	United States	Television film	
Bits and Pieces	Leland Thomas	S.E. Zygmont, Suzanna Smith	United States		
Blood Cult	Christopher Lewis	Charles Ellis, Juli Andelman, Peter Hart	United States		
The Bride	Franc Roddam	Sting, Jennifer Beals	United Kingdom; United States		
Cat's Eye	Lewis Teague	Drew Barrymore, James Woods	United States		
Chiller	Wes Craven	Michael Beck, Laura Johnson	United States	Television film	
The Covenant	Walter Grauman	Jane Badler, Judy Parfitt, Michelle Phillips, José Ferrer	United States	Television film	
Creature	William Malone	Diane Salinger, Stan Ivar, Thomas C. James	United States		
The Dark Power	Phil Smooth	Lash LaRue	United States		
Day of the Dead	George A. Romero	Lori Cardille, Terry Alexander	United States		
The Doctor and the Devils	Freddie Francis	Timothy Dalton, Jonathan Pryce, Twiggy	United Kingdom; United States		
Friday the 13th Part V: A New Beginning	Danny Steinmann	John Shepard, Melanie Kinnaman, Shavar Ross	United States	Fifth film of Friday the 13th franchise	
Fright Night	Tom Holland	Chris Sarandon, Amanda Bearse	United States		
Future-Kill	Ronald W. Moore	Edwin Neal, Marilyn Burns, Gabriel Folse	United States	Alternative title(s): Night of the Alien; Splatter	
Ghoulies	Luca Bercovici	Peter Liapis, Lisa Pelikan, Michael Des Barres	United States	First film of Ghoulies film series	
Guinea Pig: Devil's Experiment	Satoru Ogura	All performances uncredited	Japan		
Hard Rock Zombies	Krishna Shah	E.J. Curse, Geno Andrews, Sam Mann	United States		
The Hills Have Eyes Part II	Wes Craven	Michael Berryman, Tamara Stafford, Kevin Spirtas	United States; United Kingdom		
Howling II: Your Sister Is a Werewolf	Philippe Mora	Christopher Lee, Annie McEnroe, Reb Brown	United States; United Kingdom; Italy; France	Alternative title(s): Howling II: Stirba – Werewolf Bitch	
Lifeforce	Tobe Hooper	Steve Railsback, Peter Firth, Frank Finlay	United States; United Kingdom		
Massacre in Dinosaur Valley	Michele Massimo Tarantini	Michael Sopkiw, Suzane Carvalho, Milton Morris	Italy; Brazil	Alternative title(s): A Baixada dos Dinosauros; Cannibal Ferox 2; Nudo e selvaggio; Perdidos no Vale dos Dinossauros; Stranded in Dinosaur Valley	
The Midnight Hour	Jack Bender	Jonelle Allen, Shari Belafonte	United States	Television film	
Mr. Vampire	Ricky Lau	Lam Ching-ying, Pauline Wong, Ricky Hui	Hong Kong		
The Mutilator	Buddy Cooper	Matt Mitler, Morey Lampley, Frances Raines	United States		
Nail Gun Massacre	Bill Leslie, Terry Lofton	Rocky Patterson, Ron Queen, Beau Leland	United States		
The New Kids	Sean S. Cunningham	Shannon Presby, Lori Loughlin, James Spader, John Philbin, Eddie Jones, Eric Stoltz, Tom Atkins	United States		
A Nightmare on Elm Street 2: Freddy's Revenge	Jack Sholder	Mark Patton, Kim Myers, Robert Rusler	United States	Second film of A Nightmare on Elm Street franchise	
Pulgasari	Shin Sang-ok	Chang Son, Ham Gi Sop, Kenpachiro Satsuma	North Korea		
Phenomena	Dario Argento	Jennifer Connelly, Patrick Bauchau	Italy	Alternative title(s): Creepers	
Re-Animator	Stuart Gordon	Jeffrey Combs, Bruce Abbott	United States	First film of Re-Animator film series	
The Return of the Living Dead	Dan O'Bannon	Clu Gulager, James Karen, Don Calfa	United States		
Silver Bullet	Daniel Attias	Gary Busey, Corey Haim	United States		
The Stuff	Larry Cohen	Michael Moriarty, Andrea Marcovicci	United States		
Too Scared to Scream	Tony Lo Bianco	Mike Connors, Anne Archer, Leon Isaac Kennedy	United States	Alternative title(s): The Doorman	
Twisted Illusions	Tim Ritter, Joel D. Wynkoop	Jerry Ziel, Anthony T. Townes, Colleen Foley	United States		
Underworld	Clive Barker, George Pavlou	Denholm Elliott, Steven Berkoff, Larry Lamb	United Kingdom	Alternative title(s): Transmutations	
Vampire Hunter D	Toyoo Ashida	Kaneto Shiozawa, Michie Tomizawa, Seizō Katō	Japan	Animated film	
Warning Sign	Hal Barwood	Yaphet Kotto, Sam Waterston, Kathleen Quinlan	United States		

== Sources ==
- Albright, Brian (2012). Regional Horror Films, 1958-1990: A State-by-State Guide with Interviews. Jefferson, North Carolina: McFarland. ISBN 978-1-476-60042-0.
- Hardy, Phil, ed. (1995). The Overlook Film Encyclopedia. Vol. 3. Overlook Press. ISBN 0-87951-624-0.
- Rockoff, Adam (2016) [2002]. Going to Pieces: The Rise and Fall of the Slasher Film, 1978–1986. Jefferson, North Carolina: McFarland. ISBN 978-0-786-49192-6.
- Muir, John Kenneth (2010). Horror Films of the 1980s. Jefferson, North Carolina: McFarland. ISBN 978-0-786-45501-0.
- Young, R. G. (2000). The Encyclopedia of Fantastic Film: Ali Baba to Zombies. Hal Leonard Corporation. ISBN 1-55783-269-2.
