= Delirium (1972 film) =

- Directed by: Renato Polselli
- Screenplay by: Renato Polselli
- Story by: Renato Polselli
- Starring: Mickey Hargitay; Rita Calderoni; Stefano Oppedisano
- Cinematography: Ugo Brunelli
- Edited by: Otello Colangeli
- Music by: Gian Franco Reverberi
- Production company: G.R.P. Cinematografica di Renato Polselli
- Distributed by: Indipendenti Regionali
- Release date: 1972
- Country: Italy

Delirium (Italian: Delirio Caldo) is a 1972 Italian thriller film directed by Renato Polselli.

== Production ==
The English-language dub version of the film differs greatly from the Italian version of the film. In the Italian version, there is no mention of the Vietnam war trauma that instigates the killing spree. Most of the film was shot at Isarco Ravaioli's own home.

== Release ==
Delirium was first released in 1972. The film was released as by Empire Video with a 90-minute running time, in English with Dutch subtitles.

== Reception ==
From retrospective reviews, Louis Paul, in his book on Italian horror film directors described Delirium as a film that "seems to have been entirely forgotten" and as a "savage film" that will "likely leave some viewers wondering whether it would have been better to leave it that way." Scott Aaron Stine reviewed the film in his book The Gorehound's Guide to Splatter Films of the 1960s and 1970s, saying it was "a less chaotic effort" than Black Magic Rites and "aside from the stock Vietnam war footage, the innumerable nude women in chains, and some interesting plot twists" the film was "Not a good film, but a hell of a lot more engaging than many of its peers."
