= White Slave =

White Slave may refer to:

- White Slave (film), a 1985 Italian horror film
- The White Slave (1927 film), a German silent film
- The White Slave (1939 film), a French drama film
- White Slaves (film), a 1937 German film directed by Karl Anton
- The White Slave (TV series), a 2016 Colombian telenovela
- White Slave, a 2007 autobiography by Marco Pierre White
- The White Slave, an 1882 play by Bartley Campbell

== See also ==
- White slavery (disambiguation)
