= Night of Violence =

Nights of Violence
- Directed by: Roberto Mauri
- Screenplay by: Roberto Mauri; Edoardo Mulargia
- Story by: Roberto Mauri
- Starring: Alberto Lupo; Hélène Chanel; Marilù Tolo; Lisa Gastoni
- Cinematography: Vitaliano Natalucci
- Edited by: Nella Nannuzzi
- Music by: Aldo Piga
- Production company: D.M.C. Cinematografia
- Distributed by: Metropolis
- Release date: 1965
- Running time: 81 minutes
- Country: Italy

Night of Violence (Italian: Le notti della violenza) is a 1965 Italian film directed by Roberto Mauri and starring Helene Chanel and Marilu Tolo. It was initially banned in Italy on the time of its release, and released in France first as Call Girls 66. It was released later in Italy heavily edited and with some re-dubbed dialogue.

== Premise ==
The police strive to catch a masked serial killer who focuses on women.

== Cast ==
- Alberto Lupo as Insp. Ferretti
- Marilù Tolo as the sister of Carla Pratesi
- Lisa Gastoni as Linda
- Hélène Chanel as Carla Pratesi
- Cristina Gajoni as Franca
- Nerio Bernardi as Pratesi
- Elisa Mainardi as Talkative prostitute
- Aldo Berti
- Dada Gallotti as Maitresse
- Alberto Cevenini
- Gepi De Rosa
- Tullio Altamura
- Franco Pesce
- Gianni Medici
- Ugo Fangareggi as Roberto Lagosta
- Luigi Batzella (as Paolo Solvay)
- Sergio Sagnotti
- Franco Beltramme
- Giana Vivaldi
- Maria Pia Conte

== Production ==
Night of Violence was developed under the name L'uomo venuto da Hiroshima. Vitaliano Natalucci, the cinematographer, used black and white film, with Nella Nannuzzi editing. Roberto Mauriconceived the story and co-wrote the screenplay with Edoardo Mulargia. Mauri also directed, with Alberto Salvatori as the assistant director. D.M.C. Cinematografica was the production company. Aldo Piga composed the film's score.

== Release and reception ==
Night of Violence was initially banned in Italy for obscenity due to the amount of female nudity in the film. It was eventually released in France under the title Call Girls 66 in 1965 and released months later in 1966 in Italy under the title Le notti della violenza. The theatrical released had many cuts and some re-dubbed dialogue.

It received a brief release in Milan in 1967, where it had a brief review in Corriere della Sera who described it as a "crude fumetto." A retrospective review in Mad Movies in 2003 approved of the cast but called the script "verbose" and "wandering", noting that the plot points about drug trafficking were added "tacked on". Another retrospective review in 2017 by Peder Pedersen, while noting that Mauri made mediocre films, stated that the pace of the film and the inclusion of jazz made this one a "decent effort".
