= Ravaioli =

Ravaioli is a surname of Italian origin. Notable people with the surname include:

- Isarco Ravaioli (1933–2004), Italian actor
- Marco Ravaioli (born 1989), Italian motorcycle racer
