= Rita Calderoni =

Italian actress (born 1951)

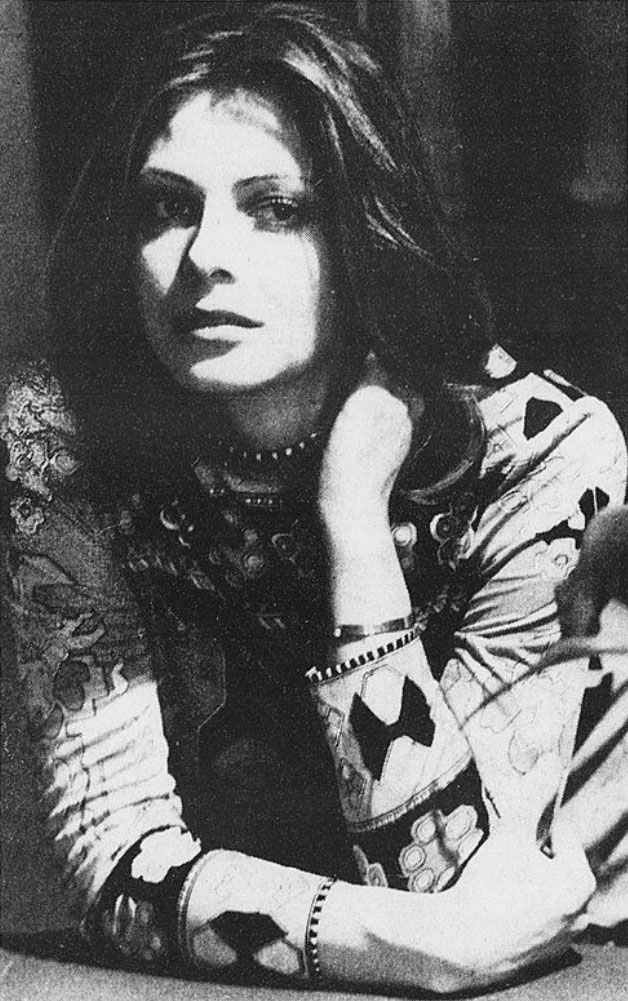
- Rita Calderoni, c. 1972.
- Born: 22 February 1951 (age 75); Rossiglione, Liguria, Italy
- Other names: Rita Caldanà
- Occupation: Actress
- Years active: 1967–1983

Rita Calderoni (born 22 February 1951) is an Italian actress. Mainly active in the 1970s in Italy, she is known for her roles in many B movies of the time.

== Life and career ==
Calderoni was born in Rossiglione in the province of Liguria in 1951. As a young woman, wanting to become a dancer, she attended classical dance classes for five years in Genoa. After her family moved to Udine, she decided considering her height to concentrate on sports, entering the women's basketball team of Udine, where she had settled with her family.

In 1967, she was discovered by director Sergio Pastore, with whom she would make her debut in the film Omicidio a sangre freddo that same year. This was the beginning of a career as an actress of about 16 years, during which she would appear in 33 films, especially in the police and horror genres. Apart from most of the works, which were low-budget (including several by Renato Polselli, Luigi Batzella or Amasi Damiani), Calderoni was also hired by some of the most important directors of Italy at the time, such as Elio Petri, Ettore Scola and Eriprando Visconti. Although she was never known by a wider audience, she was able to acquire cult status over the years. As of 1973, she was married to Giancarlo Callarà for some time. In some films she was billed as Rita Caldanà. She finished her career in 1983.

== Filmography ==
- Omicidio a sangue freddo (1967)
- A Quiet Place in the Country (1968)
- The Lady of Monza (1968)
- Police Chief Pepe (1969)
- Oh dolci baci e languide carezze (1969)
- Questa libertà di avere le ali bagnate (1970)
- Gradiva (1970)
- La verità secondo Satana (1971)
- Un gioco per Eveline (1971)
- The Hassled Hooker (1972)
- Delirium (1972)
- Black Magic Rites (1972)
- When Women Were Called Virgins (1972)
- Number One (1974)
- War Goddess (1974)
- Anno uno (1974)
- La via dei babbuini (1974)
- La sensualità è... un attimo di vita (1974)
- Il trafficone (1974)
- Nude for Satan (1974)
- Vieni, vieni amore mio (1975)
- End of the Game (1975)
- L'ultima regia (1977)
- Fate la nanna coscine di pollo (1977)
- D'improvviso al terzo piano (1977)
- Torino centrale del vizio (1979)
- Mia moglie è una strega (1980)
- The Story of Piera (1983)

== Bibliography ==
- Farinotti, Pino (1993). Dizionario dei registi. Turin: SugarCo.
- Lancia, Enrico; Poppi, Roberto (2003). Dizionario del cinema italiano. Le attrici. Rome: Gremese.
