= The Vampire of the Opera =

- Italian film poster
- Directed by: Renato Polselli
- Screenplay by: Ernesto Gastaldi; Giuseppe Pellegrini; Rentato Polselli
- Story by: Renato Polselli; Ernesto Gastaldi
- Starring: Marco Mariani; Vittoria Prada; Barbara Howard; John McDouglas
- Cinematography: Ugo Brunelli
- Edited by: Otello Colangeli
- Music by: Aldo Piga
- Production company: Nord Industrial Film
- Distributed by: Nord Industrial
- Release date: June 30, 1964 (Italy)
- Running time: 85 minutes
- Country: Italy

The Vampire of the Opera (Italian: Il mostro dell'opera; lit. 'The Monster of the Opera') is a 1964 Italian horror film co-written and directed by Renato Polselli and starring Marco Mariani and Giuseppe Addobbati.

== Plot ==
A theater troupe's young, energetic leader has secured an old theater in which to mount his new production. The theater's elderly caretaker, however, urges the group to leave at once.

After performing a Charleston and a sexy jazz-modern dance number, the crew is startled by the applause of a tuxedo-clad man in the audience, the titular vampire, who approaches the troupe and entrances its lead dancer, Julia. After wandering alone into the depths of the theater, Julia encounters the vampire, who bites her and takes her to his crypt, where his bouffanted brides are chained to a wall and giggle and hiss at one another.

After a flashback, in which we learn that Julia is the reincarnation of the vampire's love, Laura, who double-crossed him and caused him to be damned forever, the vampire vows to kill Julia for revenge, but due to his enduring love for her, he lets her go.

Julia returns to the troop, who try to flee the theater again, but as they cross the stage, the lights flicker and a jazz record beings to play, so they instead burst into a frenzied modern dance that involves messy hair, rolling about on the ground, and manic jazz hands. The vampire reappears, but when the troupe surrounds him with burning torches, he dies.

== Cast ==
- Marco Mariani as Sandro
- Giuseppe Addobbati as Stefano
- Barbara Hawards as Giulia
- Alberto Archetti as Achille
- Carla Cavalli as Aurora
- Aldo Nicodemi as Aldo
- Jody Excell as Yvette
- Milena Vukotic as Carlotta

== Production ==
The film had a very troubled production. Produced by Rossano Brazzi's brother, Oscar Brazzi, shooting started in 1961, but because of budget issues it was ended only in 1964.

Initially conceived as a sequel of Polselli's 1960 horror film The Vampire and the Ballerina, it had the working title "Il vampiro dell'opera" (lit. 'The Vampire of the Opera'), but because of the diminished interest of Italian audience in vampire films, when released it was eventually renamed, replacing the world vampire with monster ("mostro").

Ernesto Gastaldi is credited as screenwriter, but according to him, he wrote only the treatment and made a few corrections to the script. The film was shot in Narni.

== Release ==
The Vampire of the Opera was released in Italy on June 30, 1964 where it was distributed by Nord Industrial.

== Reception ==
In his book Italian Horror Film Directors, Louis Paul noted the similarities with Polselli's The Vampire and the Ballerina, both in "his fascination with full-bodied voluptuous actresses as well as the cheap and exploitative premise." Similarly, Roberto Curti described the film as a variation on The Vampire and the Ballerina and on The Playgirls and the Vampire by Piero Regnoli, "i.e., a pretext for showing scantily clad young women, with a little hint of lesbianism to spice up the proceedings."
