= Eyes Behind the Stars =

1978 film by Mario Gariazzo

- Directed by: Mario Gariazzo
- Cinematography: Erico Menczer
- Music by: Marcello Giombini
- Release date: 1978
- Language: Italian

Eyes Behind the Stars (Italian: Occhi dalle stelle) is a 1978 Italian sci-fi film directed by Mario Gariazzo (here credited as Roy Garrett).

== Cast ==
- Robert Hoffmann: Tony Harris
- Nathalie Delon: Monica Stiles
- Martin Balsam: Inspector Jim Grant
- Sherry Buchanan: Karin Hale
- Victor Valente: Coleman Perry
- Sergio Rossi: Leader of 'The Silencers'
- Mario Novelli: 'The Silencers' Henchman (credited as Antony Freeman)
- Carlo Hintermann: Air Marshal Thompson
- George Ardisson: Agent for 'The Silencers'
