= Edoardo Mulargia =

Italian film director and screenwriter

- Born: 10 December 1925; Torpè, Italy
- Died: 7 September 2005 (aged 79); Rome, Italy
- Occupations: Director; Screenwriter

Edoardo Mulargia (10 December 1925 – 7 September 2005) was an Italian director and screenwriter.

== Life and career ==
Born in Torpè, Nuoro, Mulargia graduated in Law, first working as a journalist, then directing numerous scientific and industrial short films. After being assistant of Pietro Germi and Luciano Emmer in 1963, he made his feature film debut with Le due leggi. As a film director, Mulargia specialized in the spaghetti western genre, in which he was usually credited as Tony Moore and Edward G. Muller. In the 1980s, he abandoned cinema to work for RAI television.

== Selected filmography ==
- The Invincible Brothers Maciste (screenwriter, 1964)
- Three Swords for Rome (screenwriter, 1964)
- Night of Violence (screenwriter, 1965)
- Perché uccidi ancora (director and screenwriter, 1965)
- Don't Wait Django... Shoot (director, 1967)
- Cjamango (director, 1967)
- The Reward's Yours... The Man's Mine (director and screenwriter, 1969)
- Shango (director and screenwriter, 1970)
- W Django! (director, 1971)
- La figliastra (director, 1976)
- Orinoco: Prigioniere del sesso (director, 1979) – American re-edited version: Savage Island (1985, with Linda Blair)
- Escape from Hell (director, 1980)
