= Shango (film) =

1970 film

- Theatrical release poster
- Directed by: Edoardo Mulargia
- Written by: Anthony Steffen; Edoardo Mulargia
- Starring: Anthony Steffen; Eduardo Fajardo
- Cinematography: Gino Santini
- Music by: Gianfranco Di Stefano
- Release date: 1970
- Country: Italy
- Language: Italian

Shango (Italian: Shango, la Pistola Infallibile, lit. 'Shango, the Infallible Pistol') is a 1970 Italian Spaghetti Western film directed by Edoardo Mulargia. The film was written by Mulargia and Anthony Steffen, and stars Steffen as the titular Shango.

== Plot ==
The film follows a Union Ranger, Shango, who has been taken prisoner by Confederates and Mexican Banditos who refuse to surrender, in the months after the end of the American Civil War. The Confederates are led by Major Droster, who is wanted for a massacre committed at Fort Laramie and has kept Martinez, the leader of the Banditos, in the dark about the war being over. The two have been holed up in Texas, on the edge of a 130 mile stretch of desert, taking advantage of the local populace. When Shango is released by Droster, to cover up the latter's destruction of a telegraph box, he is able to escape with the help of the boy Pedrito, who brings him to his family, who hide him while he recuperates. After Shango remembers his identity, Fernandez (Pedrito's father) helps the former pull off multiple acts of daring that earn him the support of the locals. Together, they take the fight to Droster and Martinez.

== Summary ==
The film begins with a shot of a man (Shango) imprisoned in a wooden cage, suspended in the air, swinging in the breeze, as opening credits roll. The first scene with dialogue takes place in the local telegraph hall, where a Mexican "bandito" is keeping watch over an old man, the latter of which is attempting to repair a damaged telegraph machine. When the old man succeeds, the bandito rushes off to inform his boss, who is eager to learn of his success, as they have been held up in this town for some time. Simultaneously, in the telegraph room, a message begins to appear on the ticker tape: "the war is over, north and south are united under one...". The old mans eyes widen in astonishment, as this is clearly a surprise to him, but before he can exclaim he is shot in the back of the head from behind. A man comes into view, in the dress of a confederate officer, pistol raised, before destroying the telegraph with a second bullet.

Hearing the shots, the Mexican Banditos come running. Dismayed at the scene they find, the leader of the Banditos, Martinez confronts the man, Major Droster, who claims that he is also searching for the shooter. Martinez, not fully trusting Major Droster, who had promised that he and his mean would be paid the second the telegraph was operational again, sees no other option than to search for the shooter, who can't be far away. After fanning out to cover as much ground as possible, Droster can be seen, smirking, as he cuts the cord by which Shango's cage is suspended in the tree. After Freeing the malnourished Shango, and throwing an unloaded pistol at his feet, Droster fires a shot to attract the attention of Martinez. When the Banditos come running up, Shango collapses from fatigue, and the other men get into an argument, as Martinez is suspicious of Droster's version of events, claiming that the pistol found on Shango was empty and "a Confederate Pistol". While the men argue, the young boy Pedrito can be seen watching from the bushes.

When Droster and Martinez realize Shango is missing, Droster insists that he must have put 6 shots into him and that the local Mexican people must have helped him recover. Pedrito, as it turns out, has brought Shango to the home of his father (Fernandez) and sister (Consuelo). It is reversed that Shango is a Union Ranger that was taken captive shortly after the end of the war in an ambush by Droster's and Martinez's men, of which he is the only Survivor. The Confederates and the Banditos have been keeping him prisoner ever since, the former not wanting the latter to learn that the war is over, because Major Droster is wanted for a massacre at Fort Laramie.

When Shango recuperates, he tries unsuccessfully to explain to a group of Banditos pillaging a farm that them war is indeed over and that the United States Government will giver them Amnesty if they surrender. Greatly outnumbering Shango, this results in a spectacular shootout in which Shango is able to emerge victorious, thanks primarily to his infallible gunmanship, but assisted on occasion luck, trickery, and his quick wit. After the fight, Fernandez instructs his Mexican friends to take all of the weapons, which Shango then insists they hide, until the right time.

When Droster himself, after Shango has broken into his barracks to confront him personally, will not agree to lay down his arms, the latter is taken prisoner. After being led away by a couple of confederate gunmen, Shango waits until they walk into the darkness before defeating his captor sixth only his fists. Reinforcements arrive, but Shango is able to escape by taking one of the knocked out men's guns, and making a break for it. The reinforcements fire on him at the same moment as he dives for the ground, causing their bullets to miss, before immediately returning fire from his back with deadly accuracy—a tactic he makes use of often when in a pinch.

After escaping Droster's headquarters when it has become clear the Confederates will not surrender, Shango decides to make a break for the nearest Union Fort, which Fernandez says is across a 130 mile vast expanse of desert. Determined to steal a horse and try, Fernandez convinces Shango to let one os his men attempt the journey instead. Immediately after acquiring the horse in a brief shootout, the rider departs—his silhouette can be seen at the top of a ridge as the horse gallops away—but is immediately shot down. At this point, believing they must make a last stand, Shango tells Fernandez to arm the Mexicans.

It is during this time that a confederate soldier comes calling to one of the Mexican families, insisting that Major Droster is very sad and that he needs some company, before leading the wife out of the house. The husband, in anguish, produces a pistol from a hole in the wall, and then follows the soldiers and his wife into the town, shouting "cowards!" repeatedly. This results in a shootout in which the man, his wife, and the boy Pedrito, who had been running about the town distributing the guns to the other Mexicans, are killed.

Martinez, then tries a different tactic: hoping to get the Mexicans to hand Shango over, he buries many of their wives in the ground up to their necks and promises to burn them if Shango is not brought to him by midnight. Not seeing any other option, a group of Mexicans brings Shango to Martinez right as the clock strikes midnight, as a burning trench's flames near the women's faces. It is, however, an ambush. They wait until they are within a close range of Martinez and his Banditos before all opening fire. The tactic is ultimately successful, and the women are freed after Martinez, the last of his men stranding, demands that Shango come out and face him, only for Shango to reply, "I'm right here, turn around", before waiting for Martinez to do so before shooting him, from the ditch in the ground that Martinez had just walked over moments prior.

After this, when the Mexicans are celebrating, a man run's up and tells them that Droster and his men are leaving. Indeed, a wagon full of forlorn looking Confederate troops can be seen being driven into the distance. Overjoyed they return to the town. Shango Insists that this is merely a ruse, but people pay little mind. Fernandez again tells Shango that he cannot hope to reason with the Mexicans. So, against his better judgment, Shango accompanies them back into town, where they break the windows in all the buildings and begin to party in the streets with masked dancers and colorful streamers. As a guest of honor, Shango is at the center of the proceedings, when Droster and his men reappear, encircling all of the Mexicans. They insist again that they hand over Shango, but this time it is the women who surround the latter and refuse to let him surrender. The Confederates, under Major Droster's orders, open fire on the unarmed Mexicans, many of whom fall to the ground, causing the rest to scatter. Then, the surviving Mexican men return fire and in the ensuing battle, all the confederate soldiers are killed, except for Major Droster, and Shango is wounded in the leg. Droster, who is stalking Shango, upon realizing that he is wounded crawling on the ground unarmed, while he has a shotgun, reacts gleefully. He begins dancing and whooping in the streets, firing off shot after shot and giving Shango the time to crawl to his pistol in the dirt, which he then immediately turns on Droster, shooting him while lying on his back, as is his signature fashion. Droster drops his gun and falls to ground in a convulsion.

== Cast ==
- Anthony Steffen as Shango
- Eduardo Fajardo as Major Droster
- Maurice Poli as Martinez
- Barbara Nelli as Consuelo
- Giusva Fioravanti as Pedrito
- Attilio Dottesio as Fernandez
- Gabriella Giorgelli as Pamela
- Massimo Carocci as Scott
- Spartaco Conversi as Bragna
- Liana Del Balzo as Tana
