= Nude for Satan =

1974 Italian horror film

- Directed by: Luigi Batzella
- Screenplay by: Luigi Batzella
- Story by: Luigi Batzella
- Produced by: Remo Angioli
- Starring: Rita Calderoni; Stelio Candelli; Giuseppe Mattei
- Cinematography: Antonio Maccoppi
- Edited by: Luigi Batzella
- Music by: Alberto Baldan Bembo
- Production company: C.R.C. Produzioni Cinematografiche e Televisive
- Distributed by: P.A.B.
- Release date: 23 October 1974 (Italy)
- Running time: 91 minutes
- Country: Italy
- Box office: ₤56.364 million

Nude for Satan (Italian: Nuda per Satana) is a 1974 Italian horror film directed by Luigi Batzella.

== Plot ==
Late at night, Dr. Benson drives through the countryside and stumbles upon a car crash where he finds a wounded young woman named Susan. Dr. Benson gets Susan in his car and seeks shelter for the two in a nearby castle. He is greeted at the door by Evelyn, who looks exactly like Susan, and is invited to stay the night. Dr. Benson soon meets his own doppelgänger named Peter. When in the castle, Dr. Benson discovers that time and space do not follow ordinary logic in Satan's world.

== Style ==
Film historian Roberto Curti described Nude for Satan as walking a thin edge between erotic horror and pornography as other films of the period did. Curti described the film as "tempted to jump to the other side of the fence but still retaining some prudish reservation".

== Production ==
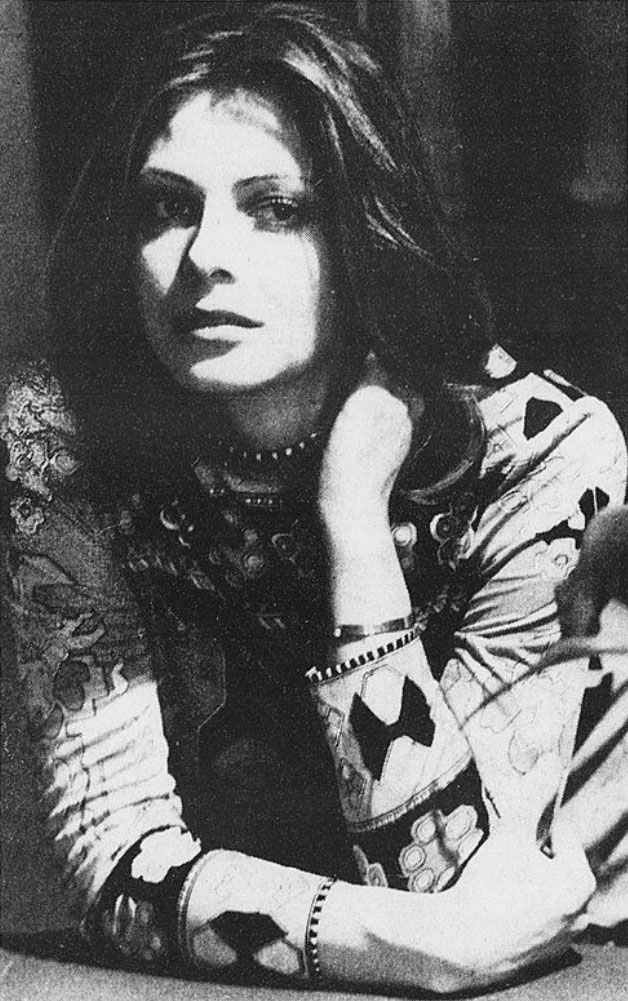
Rita Calderoni starred in the film as both Susan Smith and Evelyn.

Rita Calderoni claimed that director Luigi Batzella had cast her in the film after seeing her in Riti, magie nere e segrete orge nel Trecento. According to the Public Cinematographic Register, Nude for Satan began filming on March 25, 1974. It was shot at the Castle of Monte San Giovanni Campano in Frosinone, Lazio. Calderoni stated that the film shoot took five or six weeks. Calderoni recalled that the car accident scene in the film took Batzella an entire night to film. In the finished film, the accident is represented by a single tire rolling into frame. Calderoni recollected that she was injured during the spider attack sequence in the film.

== Release ==
Nude for Satan was initially rejected by the board of censors in Italy due to "continuous obscene sequences, some of them even portraying lesbian intercourses". On appeal, several cuts to the film were suggested to the producer. This included removing scenes involving sexual intercourse between the doctor and the woman who represents Susan's double, a reduction of Susan's nightmare scene to avoid a "description of lesbian intercourse", and to "avoid erotic acts of the main characters in a chair" from the final scene of the film. The producer obliged and the film was released in Italy with a V.M.18 rating. Nude for Satan was released in Italy on 23 October 1974 where it was distributed by P.A.B. The film grossed a total of 56,364,000 Italian lire domestically.

Nude for Satan was released on DVD and VHS by Image Entertainment in 1999.

== Reception ==
In retrospective reviews, Curti described the film's direction as "clueless" noting that Batzella "cannot find a formal balance and keeps piling up whatever comes to his mind." In his book Perverse Titillation, Danny Shipka summarized the plot noting that "the Devil is bored and wants to have an orgy. Oh, and Calderoni gets molested by a giant spider. You'll be bored too." In his book Italian Horror Film Directors, Louis Paul declared the film to be a "demented exercise into semi-pornographic skin flick horror"
