= The Devil's Wedding Night =

- Theatrical release poster
- Directed by: Luigi Batzella; Joe D'Amato
- Screenplay by: Walter Bigari; Luigi Batzella
- Story by: Walter Bigari; Paolo Solvay
- Produced by: Franco Gaudenzi
- Starring: Mark Damon; Rosalba Neri; Esmeralda Barros; Francesca Romana Davila; Ciro Papa
- Cinematography: Joe D'Amato
- Edited by: Piera Bruni; Gianfranco Simoncelli
- Music by: Vasil Kojukaroff
- Production company: Virginia Cinematografica
- Distributed by: Variety Distribution
- Release date: 14 March 1973 (Italy)
- Running time: 94 minutes
- Country: Italy
- Language: Italian
- Box office: ₤117.150 million

The Devil's Wedding Night (Italian: Il plenilunio delle vergini, lit. 'Full Moon of the Virgins') is a 1973 Italian horror film directed by Luigi Batzella and Joe D'Amato and starring Mark Damon, Rosalba Neri, Esmeralda Barros, Francesca Romana Davila, and Ciro Papa

== Plot ==
Two rival brothers are looking for the magic ring of the Nibelungen, a mystical jewel that confers all power to the one who possesses it. The first, Karl, is an archaeologist who wishes to give it to an archaeological institute; the second, Franz, is a materialist who wants to appropriate it to be rich and powerful. Franz, after having read Karl's research, travels to the Carpathian Mountains in Transylvania, to the ancient castle of Count Dracula.

The innkeeper's daughter tells him that on the first full moon night of the summer that five virgin girls from the village are chosen by the powers of evil and taken to the castle to be sacrificed, and that the place is infested with vampires. She gives Franz an amulet for protection. After spending the night with the girl, Franz leaves her to go to the castle but forgets to take the amulet.

In the manner of Count Dracula, he is greeted by the housekeeper Lara and meets Countess Dolingen De Vries, the Count's widow. The Countess uses the famous ring to bring girls home to kill them, then to bathe in their blood. Bewitched and bitten by her, Franz immediately marries her. Their marriage is followed by the sacrifice of five girls.

Equally looking for the ring, Karl arrives in turn in Transylvania, but does not know his brother was vampirized by the Countess.

== Cast ==
- Mark Damon: Karl Schiller / Franz Schiller
- Rosalba Neri: La Contessa Dolingen de Vries (as Sara Bay)
- Esmeralda Barros: Lara the Zombie
- Xiro Papas: The Vampire Monster (as Ciro Papas)
- Gengher Gatti: The Mysterious Man (as Alexander Getty)
- Enza Sbordone: Tanya the Innkeeper's Daughter (as Francesca Romana Davila)
- Carlo Gentili: The Innkeeper (as Mort Baxter)
- Giorgio Dolfin: First Villager at Inn (as George Dolfin)
- Stefano Oppedisano: Second Villager at Inn (as Stephen Hopper)

== Style ==
In his book Vampire Films of the 1970s, Gary A. Smith described the film as "a throwback to gothic horror" and that it appeared to be influenced by Hammer vampire films of the 1970s, specifically Twins of Evil.

== Production ==
Producer Franco Gaudenzi stated that The Devil's Wedding Night was a film that actor Mark Damon "wanted to do, it was a script he had, it was his creature." Gaudenzi expanded on this, stating Damon was planning on selling the film to an American production company who was interested in distributing it. The screenplay is credited to Walter Bigari and Luigi Batzella, while the copy of the screenplay which is close to finished product with many technical indications only credits Batzella's name. This version of the screenplay includes a prologue which is not in the film, in which the Countess summons the forces of evil while in her castle nude women are tied to a column with their throats being slashed. When choosing the director, Gaudenzi hired Batzella, stating that he was often in their office discussing film ideas with Joe D'Amato and Bruno Mattei.

The Devil's Wedding Night began shooting on July 31, 1972. It was shot on location at Castello Piccolomini in Balsorano. Gaudenzi stated that despite only Batzella getting a credit on the film, it was directed by both D'Amato and Batzella, as Gaudenzi had D'Amato reshoot some scenes. Damon was impressed with D'Amato, and recommended him to Roger Corman to work on the American production The Arena. Rosalba Neri spoke later about Batzella's direction on set stating that she "never understood him. It was like there were two of them, going different directions...and rarely meeting. A bit schizophrenic, indeed."

== Release ==
The Devil's Wedding Night was released in Italy by Florida Cinematografica on 14 March 1973. The film's erotic content was cut by Italian censors who demanded that a sex scene be shortened and that "all scenes be eliminated where the man kisses the lower part of the woman's body." The film grossed a total of 117,115,000 Italian lire domestically in Italy.

== See also ==
- List of Italian films of 1973
- List of horror films of 1973
