= Three Strangers in Rome =

- Directed by: Claudio Gora
- Written by: Arpad DeRiso
- Starring: Claudia Cardinale
- Cinematography: Armando Nannuzzi
- Edited by: Nela Nannuzzi
- Music by: Nino P. Tassone
- Distributed by: Laika Cinematografica
- Release date: 2 November 1958
- Country: Italy
- Language: Italian

Tre straniere a Roma, also known as Three Strangers in Rome, is a 1958 Italian romantic comedy film directed by Claudio Gora starring Claudia Cardinale. The film was one of the first movies with Cardinale in a leading role.

== Cast ==
- Yvonne Monlaur: Nanda
- Claudia Cardinale: Marisa
- Françoise Danell: Elsa
- Luciano Marin: Sandro Nencioni
- Roy Ciccolini: Sergio
- Leonardo Botta: Franco
- Tamara Lees: Sandro's girlfriend
- Renato Chiantoni: Pasquale
- Nando Bruno: Vincenzo's father
- Guglielmo Inglese: Michele
- Alberto Talegalli: Uncle Gaetano
- Gina Mascetti: Owner of the Pensione Aurora
- Dolores Palumbo: Sergio's mother
- Andrea Scotti: Osvaldo
- Marino Barreto Junior: Himself
- Turi Pandolfini: Turiddu
- Renato Chiantoni: Pasquale
- Marco Tulli: Angelino
