= Aldo Piga =

Italian composer

Aldo Piga (1928–1994) was an Italian-American composer who worked mainly in New York.

Aldo Piga's work was mainly produced in the 1950s and 1960s in Italy. He started as a song composer and later approached the movie soundtrack field. His participation in the pop music Italian market counts with two participations in the famous contest of Sanremo, one of which was overshadowed in the year of the famous Modugno's song "Volare". He recorded about one hundred film soundtracks. One film soundtrack that he contributed to was Il grido, a 1957 Italian drama directed by Michelangelo Antonioni, which included “Non lo saprai mai” (You will never know it) by Piga and Renato Barneschi. His activity as a composer was strongly influenced by classical music and bebop jazz roots of his early years in the New York music scene.

Piga's work was also known to British television audiences in the last late 1950s. "Come to My Arms", which Piga wrote with Maurizio de Angelis and Jack Elliott featured on the British television programme Six-Five Special in 1958, where it was performed by Dickie Valentine.

After a promising career as a music writer, he decided to start working as a film producer in the late 1960s. This change led to an end in both his careers as a writer and producer. In the 1990s Piga left Italy to retire in New York where he spent his last days until 1994.

== Filmography ==
=== As composer ===
==== 1950s ====
- I mafiosi (1959)
- Gli avventurieri dei tropici (1959)

(Seven in the Sun) (USA)

- Due selvaggi a corte (1959)

==== 1960s ====
- L'amante del vampiro (1960)

(The Vampire and the Ballerina) (USA)
(The Vampire's Lover) (USA)

- Capitani di ventura (1961)
- La grande vallata (1961)
- Capitaine tempête(1961)

(Captain Tempest) (English)
(La Spada della vendetta) (Italy)

- La Corona di fuoco (1961)

(Umberto Biancamano) (Italy)

- L'urlo dei bolidi (1961)

(The Roar of the Bolidi) (English)

- La notte dell'innominato (1962)
- Il trionfo di Robin Hood (1962)

(The Triumph of Robin Hood) (USA)

- Due leggi, Le (1962)
- Un branco di vigliacchi (1962)

(No Man's Land) (USA)

- Letto di sabbia (1962)
- Il segno del vendicatore (1962)
- Strage dei vampiri, La (1962)

(Curse of the Blood Ghouls) (USA)

- Tempo di credere (1962)
- L'ultima preda del vampiro (1962)

(Curse of the Vampire) (USA)
(The Playgirls and the Vampire) (USA)

- Lo sparviero dei Caraibi (1963)

(Caribbean Hawk) (USA)

- Il pirata del diavolo (1963)

(Flag of Death) (UK)
(The Saracens) (USA)

- Le tre spade di Zorro (1963)

(Sword of Zorro) (USA)
(Tres espadas del Zorro, Las) (Spain)

- Tarzak contro gli uomini leopardo (1964)

(Ape Man of the Jungle) (USA)

- Amore facile (1964)
- Il ribelle di Castelmonte (1964)

(Sword of Rebellion) (USA)

- Il mostro dell'opera (1964)

(The Vampire of the Opera)

- Italia di notte n. 1 (1964)

(Italian Sexy Show)

- Michelino Cucchiarella (1964)
- Zorikan lo sterminatore (1964)

(Zorikan the Barbarian) (USA)
I tre centurioni

- Three Swords for Rome (1964)
- Le notti della violenza (1965)

(Night of Violence) (USA)

- Cinque tombe per un medium (1965)

(Terror-Creatures from the Grave)

- Fango sulla metropoli (1965)

(I criminali della metropoli) (Italy)

- A... come assassino (1966)
- I tre centurioni (1966)

(Three Swords for Rome) (English)

- Rembrandt 7 antwortet nicht... (1966)

Mark Donen agente Zeta 7 (Italy)
(Z-7, operación Rembrandt) (Spain)
(Z7 Operation Rembrandt) (USA)

- Assassino senza volto (1968)

=== As producer ===
- Three Swords for Rome (1964)
- Rembrandt 7 antwortet nicht... (1966) (uncredited producer)

Mark Donen agente Zeta 7 (Italy)
Z-7, operación Rembrandt (Spain)
Z7 Operation Rembrandt (USA)
