= I Kiss the Hand =

- Directed by: Vittorio Schiraldi
- Written by: Vittorio Schiraldi
- Produced by: Arcangelo Picchi
- Starring: Arthur Kennedy; John Saxon; Agostina Belli
- Cinematography: Marcello Gatti
- Edited by: Franco Fraticelli
- Music by: Enrico Simonetti
- Distributed by: Cannon Films
- Release date: 1973
- Language: Italian

I Kiss the Hand (Italian: Baciamo le mani, also known as Family Killer) is a 1973 Italian crime film directed by Vittorio Schiraldi and starring Arthur Kennedy, John Saxon and Agostina Belli. It is based on a novel by the same Vittorio Schiraldi, a writer and journalist at his film debut.

== Cast ==
- Arthur Kennedy as Don Angelino Ferrante
- John Saxon as Gaspare Ardizzone
- Agostina Belli as Mariuccia
- Pino Colizzi as Masino D'Amico
- Spiros Focás as Luca Ferrante
- Paolo Turco as Massimo Ferrante
- Marino Masé as Luciano Ferrante
- Corrado Gaipa as Don Emilio Grisanti
- Giuseppe Addobbati as Nicola D'Amico
- Joshua Sinclair as Stefano Ferrante
- Daniele Vargas as Don Santino Billeci
- Accursio Di Leo as Pietro Corazza
- Jane Avril as Prostitute
- Massimo Sarchielli as Totò Grisanti
- Tino Bianchi as Pietrino Gambara

== Reception ==
Film critic Roberto Curti referred to the film as "a turgid, verbose and violent melodrama", in which the "only memorable asset is John Saxon’s over-the-top performance".
