= Three Swords for Rome =

- Directed by: Roberto Mauri
- Screenplay by: Roberto Mauri; Edoardo Mulargia; Mario Russo
- Produced by: Aldo Piga
- Starring: Roger Browne; Mimmo Palmara; Mario Novelli; Lisa Gastoni
- Cinematography: Vitaliano Natalucci
- Music by: Aldo Piga
- Production companies: Ca. Pi Film S.r.L.; Radius Productions
- Release date: 31 December 1964 (Italy)
- Running time: 95 minutes
- Countries: Italy; France

Three Swords for Rome (Italian: I tre centurioni) is a 1964 Italian peplum film co-written and directed by Roberto Mauri and starring Roger Browne. The film was produced by Aldo Piga, who also composed the film's score.

== Cast ==
- Roger Browne as Fabio
- Mimmo Palmara as Maximo
- Mario Novelli as Julio (credited as Tony Freeman)
- Lisa Gastoni as Elena
- Mario Feliciani
- Philippe Hersent
- Walter Brandi
- Nerio Bernardi
- Véra Valmont
- Alberto Cevenini as Elagabalus
- Silvia Maresca as Julia Soaemias

== Release ==
Three Swords for Rome was released in Italy on December 31, 1964. On its release in the United States, it ran at 85 minutes.
