= Yvonne Monlaur =

French actress (1939–2017)

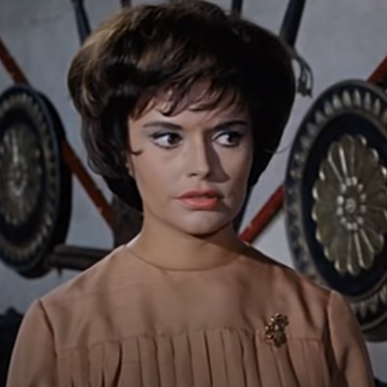
- Monlaur in Gerarchi si muore (1961)
- Born: Yvonne-Thérèse-Marie-Camille Bédat de Monlaur; 15 December 1939; Pau, France
- Died: 18 April 2017 (aged 77); Paris, France
- Occupation: Actress
- Years active: 1956–1967

Yvonne Monlaur (born Yvonne-Thérèse-Marie-Camille Bédat de Monlaur; 15 December 1939 – 18 April 2017) was a French film actress of the late 1950s and 1960s best known for her roles in the Hammer horror films.

== Early years ==
Monlaur was born in Pau, Pyrénées-Atlantiques, France. Her father, Pierre Bédat de Monlaur (fr), was a poet, descended from the French comital family of d'Escoubès de Monlaur; her mother was a ballet dancer. As a child, she studied ballet, and as a teenager she was a fashion model.

== Career ==
Monlaur starred in the 1958 Italian film Three Strangers in Rome, which was among Claudia Cardinale's earliest films, and in 1960 in the horror film Circus of Horrors alongside prominent actors in British film such as Anton Diffring and Donald Pleasence. In 1960, she also starred in the Hammer horror film The Brides of Dracula alongside other noted British actors of the day Peter Cushing and Freda Jackson and in The Terror of the Tongs (1961) with Christopher Lee.

Monlaur screentested for the role of Domino Derval in the 1965 James Bond film Thunderball. The role eventually went to another French actress, Claudine Auger.

== Later years ==
After working on a number of German and Italian films, Monlaur left the industry and returned to Paris. She attended a few film conventions, which included tributes to her time working on the Hammer films.

== Death ==
Monlaur died in Paris, France, on 18 April 2017, aged 77, survived by her only son Alexis.

== Selected filmography ==
Year	Title	Role	Director
1956	Mannequins of Paris	Janine	André Hunebelle
1958	Three Strangers in Rome	Nanda	Claudio Gora
1960	Inn for Trouble	Yvette Dupres	C.M. Pennington-Richards
1960	Circus of Horrors	Nicole Vanet	Sidney Hayers
1960	The Brides of Dracula	Marianne	Terence Fisher
1960	It Started in Naples		Melville Shavelson
1961	The Terror of the Tongs	Lee	Anthony Bushell
1961	Gerarchi si muore	Rosalina	Giacomo Simonelli
1962	Ladies' Man	Claudia	Bernard Borderie
1962	Hawk of the Caribbean	Arica Mageiras	Piero Regnoli
1963	Le concerto de la peur (Night of Lust)	Nora Rivière	José Bénazéraf
1964	License to Kill	Mireille	Henri Decoin
1965	Heaven on One's Head	Françoise	Yves Ciampi
