= The Terror of the Tongs =

1961 British film by Anthony Bushell

- UK theatrical release poster
- Directed by: Anthony Bushell
- Written by: Jimmy Sangster
- Produced by: Kenneth Hyman
- Starring: Christopher Lee; Yvonne Monlaur; Geoffrey Toone
- Cinematography: Arthur Grant
- Edited by: Eric Boyd-Perkins
- Music by: James Bernard
- Production company: Hammer Films
- Distributed by: Columbia Pictures
- Release date: 15 March 1961
- Running time: 76 minutes
- Country: United Kingdom
- Language: English

The Terror of the Tongs (also known as Terror of the Hatchet Men) is a 1961 British adventure film directed by Anthony Bushell and starring Geoffrey Toone, Christopher Lee and Yvonne Monlaur. It was written by Jimmy Sangster.

== Plot ==
In 1910, Mr. Ming is an agent of a group which secretly fights against tongs, China's criminal organizations. To fulfill his mission, he takes a ship to Hong Kong. En route, he makes acquaintance with Captain Jackson Sale, a British sea officer who lives in Hong Kong with his teenage daughter Helena. Sale is indifferent about China's tong problem, as it does not directly affect him. Ming hides a note containing information about the Red Dragon, Hong Kong's biggest tong, inside a poetry book, which he gives to Sale as a gift to Helena, knowing that her servant is a secret member of the resistance.

Ming is later the victim of a ceremonial killing. In this type of assassinations, the killer murders their victim with a ceremonial axe and gauntlet in a crowded place, thus keeping the population scared of the Red Dragon Tong. Before dying, Ming kills his assassin. After searching Ming's body, the Tong do not find any incriminating note that could hurt their cause. To be sure, they decide to kill anyone who could have received that kind of information from Ming. Looking for the note, they search Sale's house, kill Helena, and eventually, also the servant. After learning of his daughter's death, Sale vows revenge.

He starts investigating the Tong on his own, despite the police's warnings. Because of this investigation, he gets into a fight with a Tong member. Sale is about to be killed when Lee, the criminal's wife saves him. Lee was forced to marry the man and, hating him, decides to aid in his demise before another innocent person is killed. Realizing the woman is in danger for defying the will of the Tong, Sale tells her to stay at his place.

Sale continues to investigate the Tong, who eventually kidnap and torture him, wanting to know what he knows. Sale is rescued by the Beggar, another member of the resistance. A beaten Sale is brought home to the care of Lee, who is developing feelings for him. While recovering, Sale starts a relationship with Lee.

The Beggar eventually visits Sale and offers him a choice: if Sale only cares about his own life, he should leave China; if he cares about bringing down the tongs, he should stay in Hong Kong, where he most likely will be the target of another ceremonial killing. If Sale survives the attack on his own, in front of a crowd of onlookers, that might be the spark of rebellion the Beggar needs to rile up the people against the Tong. Sale decides to stay and fight.

The night the hit on Sale is to be fulfilled, Lee suspects something sinister is going on and rushes to the port to save him. She ends up sacrificing herself to save Sale, who shoots her assassin down in front of dozens of onlookers. The Beggar takes advantage of this moment and incites a revolution against the Tong. The enraged crowd eventually reaches the headquarters of the Red Dragon Tong's Hong Kong division, wanting to kill its leader, Chung King. Before they can do so, Chung King, hoping his ancestors will not be disappointed in him, is stabbed to death by his assistant.

== Cast ==
- Christopher Lee as Chung King, Leader of the Red Dragon Tong's Hong Kong division and the primary antagonist.
- Geoffrey Toone as Captain Jackson Sale, a leading figure in the colony and primary protagonist whose daughter is murdered by the tongs.
- Yvonne Monlaur as Lee, a mixed-race serving girl and Sale's love interest.
- Marne Maitland as the Beggar, an agent of an underground movement against the tongs.
- Brian Worth as District Commissioner Harcourt.
- Ewen Solon as Tang How, Tong Leader's aide and Chung King's right-hand man.
- Roger Delgado as Tang Hao, tong enforcer.
- Richard Leech as Inspector Bob Dean.
- Charles Lloyd-Pack as Dr. Fu Chao, tong member who murders people mainly by giving then lethal injections.
- Marie Burke as Maya, a friend of Captain Sale.
- Barbara Brown as Helena Sale. Captain Sale's daughter who is murdered by the tongs.
- Burt Kwouk as Mr. Ming, a diplomat carrying important documents concerning the tongs.

== Production ==
The Terror of the Tongs was quickly shot within the months of April and May 1960.

The film is a quasi-remake of another Hammer film, The Stranglers of Bombay (1959) directed by Terence Fisher. The setting is changed to Hong Kong in 1910 from India in the 19th century but the basic plot of a middle-aged, yet youthful hero attempting to uncover the crimes of a secret sect in a British colony, being captured by the sect, and later released, having a personal stake in the outcome, finding that there is an inside villain, and losing friends or family are all there.

The film is notable in that is the first Hammer horror film to afford Christopher Lee top billing. Lee also reported to work on the film after a vacation in Northern Italy with a deep tan, which was problematic for the make-up department since his character was supposed to have very pale skin. Lee later said in interviews that the make-up to make him appear Chinese in this movie was the most uncomfortable make-up he had had to endure up to that time.

== Critical reception ==
The Monthly Film Bulletin wrote: "Retrograde blood-bath, stingily staged along lines indistinguishable from Hammer's previous The Stranglers of Bombay."

The New York Herald Tribune wrote: "It's all very paltry and not a little grimy."

Leslie Halliwell wrote "Gory melodrama with dollops of screams, torture and vaguely orgiastic goings-on."

In The Hammer Story: The Authorised History of Hammer Films, Barnes and Hearn wrote: "The Terror of the Tongs, perhaps thankfully a rarely-seen film, remains resolutely undistinguished in almost every department.""

In Hammer Films: An Exhaustive Filmography, Johnson and Del Vecchio wrote: "The Terror of the Tongs was a nasty entry in Hammer's move from Gothic horror to costume adventure ... Unfortunately, as with Lee's later Fu Manchu series, he s given nothing to do except utter philosophy and look menacing. ... Despite fine individual ingredients, The Terror of the Tongs does not add up to much and cannot stand with similarly themed films like The Pirates of Blood River and Captain Clegg."

== Tie-in book ==
A tie-in to the film written by Jimmy Sangster and based upon his screenplay was published by Digit Books in 1961.

== Cultural references ==
On the film's opening matinee showing in Sauchiehall Street, Glasgow, a crowd of rowdy teenagers and young adults both male and female ran down the street shouting "tongs" causing a melee in which the police had to be called. During the 1960s, an area of the city's Calton district earned the nickname "Tongland" due to the high presence of a teenaged street gang inspired by the film. To this day in Glasgow gang culture the cry of "tongs ya bass" can often be heard wherever youths come together to fight in a show of territorial loyalty.
