= White slavery (disambiguation) =

White slavery refers to enslavement of European Christians, primarily in the Barbary slave trade.

White slavery may also refer to:

- "White Slavery", a song by Type O Negative from the album World Coming Down, 1999
- White slavery, a term used in the 19th and early 20th centuries to refer to the sex trafficking of white women

== See also ==
- White Slave (disambiguation)
