= The Syndicate: A Death in the Family =

- Directed by: Piero Zuffi
- Written by: Piero Zuffi
- Produced by: Roberto Loyola
- Cinematography: Pasqualino De Santis
- Edited by: Franco Arcalli
- Music by: Piero Piccioni
- Release date: 1970
- Language: English

The Syndicate: A Death in the Family (Italian: Colpo rovente, also known as Red Hot Shot) is a 1970 Italian crime film directed by Piero Zuffi and written by Ennio Flaiano and the same Zuffi.

In 2004 it was restored and shown as part of the retrospective "Storia Segreta del Cinema Italiano: Italian Kings of the Bs" at the 61st Venice International Film Festival.

== Cast ==
- Michael Reardon as Frank Berin
- Barbara Bouchet as Monica Brown
- Carmelo Bene as Billy Desco
- Susanna Martinkova as Fanny, La Cieca
- Isa Miranda as Tenutaria del Bordello
- Eduardo Ciannelli as Parker Edward Ciannelli
- David Groh as Don Carbo
- Vittorio Duse as Mac Brown Victor Duncan
- Nello Pazzafini as Policeman
- John McDouglas
- Helen Mirren

== Music ==
The film was scored by prolific score composer Piero Piccioni, who wrote the piece "Mexican Dream" as part of its soundtrack.

== See also ==
- List of Italian films of 1970
