= The Vampire and the Ballerina =

1960 Italian film by Renato Polselli

- Italian theatrical release poster
- Directed by: Renato Polselli
- Screenplay by: Renato Polselli; Giuseppe Pellegrini; Ernesto Gastaldi
- Story by: Renato Polselli; Giuseppe Pellegrini; Ernesto Gastaldi
- Produced by: Bruno Bolognesi
- Starring: Hélène Rémy; Tina Gloriani; Walter Brandi; Maria Luisa Rolando; Isarco Ravaioli
- Cinematography: Angelo Baistrocchi
- Edited by: Renato Cinquini
- Music by: Aldo Piga
- Production company: Consorzio Italiano Films
- Distributed by: Rome International Films
- Release date: May 23, 1960 (Italy)
- Running time: 83 minutes
- Country: Italy
- Language: Italian
- Box office: ₤98 million

The Vampire and the Ballerina (Italian: L'amante del vampiro) is a 1960 Italian horror film directed and co-written by Renato Polselli. The movie is about an adventure of two beautiful dancers and their two male friends in an old spooky castle where a beautiful female vampire and a male vampire dwell.

== Plot ==
A group of beautiful dancers reside in a house and practice dance there. Two of the dancers Luisa and Francesca along with a male friend Luca went to a spooky abandoned castle only to find that a man and a woman live there. In reality both the man and the woman known as Countess Alda are vampires. What happens to them forms the plot of the movie.

== Cast ==
- Hélène Rémy as Luisa
- Walter Brandi as Herman
- Maria Luisa Rolando as Countess Alda
- Pier Ugo Gragnani as Professor
- Tina Gloriani as Francesca
- Isarco Ravaioli as Luca
- Gino Turini as Giorgio

== Production ==
The film's story and screenplay were written by director Renato Polselli and screenplay authors Giuseppe Pellegrini and Ernesto Gastaldi. The original screenplay for the film was written by Giampaolo Callegaris. Ernesto Gastaldi described the script as "rather canine", and wrote a new one with director Renato Polselli. Gastaldi felt the script was no different than any others he had worked on, with the only new element being vampires. Gastaldi commented that since Dracula starring Christopher Lee had been such a big hit in Italy, producers and distributors were eager to make their own vampire films.

Gastaldi recalled the casting for the film involved Gino Turini, who put in part of the money for the film, and Hélène Rémy as the film was originally going to be a co-production deal with France. Gastaldi also noted that the casting of Tina Gloriani was due to her being the director's lover at the time.

The film was shot at the castle of Artena in later 1959 in three weeks. Renato Polselli has claimed that the skeletons in the vampire’s crypt scenes were real skeletons. The shot of the vampire's face deteriorating was a homemade special effect. Polselli stated that the case was made with plaster, followed by the make-up artist molding an adhesive rubber mask over it with a layer of ash between the plastic and rubber. “We made a face cast with plaster, then the make-up artist and I molded an adhesive rubber mask over it. Our trick was to put a layer of ash between the plaster and the rubber."

== Release ==
The Vampire and the Ballerina was released in Italy on May 23, 1960 where it was distributed by Rome International Films. The film grossed a total of 98 million Italian lire on its theatrical run. The film was published as a photonovel in the March 1962 issue of Malia - I fotoromanzi del brivido. The film was shown in Los Angeles on October 31, 1962.

Italian censors gave The Vampire and the Ballerina a V.M. 16 rating, making it "forbidden to those under 16 years old". The censors demanded that all close-ups of the vampire's face be cut and that the final melting of the vampires be shortened. Months after the censors demands were sent, the producer submitted a new version of the film which passed with a V.M. 16 rating and no cuts.

The film has been released for home viewing by Amazon Instant Video and on an English-friendly DVD by NoShame in Italy.

Scream Factory released the film on Blu-ray for the first time in the U.S. on May 22, 2018 with a new high definition transfer of the film sourced from the last surviving film elements.

== Legacy ==
In his book Italian Horror Film Directors, Louis Paul described the film as "an important footnote in the history of Italian horror for being among the first films to blatantly mix sex and horror", and noted it strongly influenced European horror cinema, including late 1960s Hammer productions.

== Footnotes ==
=== References ===
- Curti, Roberto (2015). Italian Gothic Horror Films, 1957–1969. McFarland. ISBN 978-1-4766-1989-7.
- Paul, Louis (2005). Italian Horror Film Directors. McFarland. ISBN 978-0-7864-8749-3.

== See also ==
- List of horror films of 1960
- List of Italian films of 1960
