= Isarco Ravaioli =

Italian film actor (1933–2004)

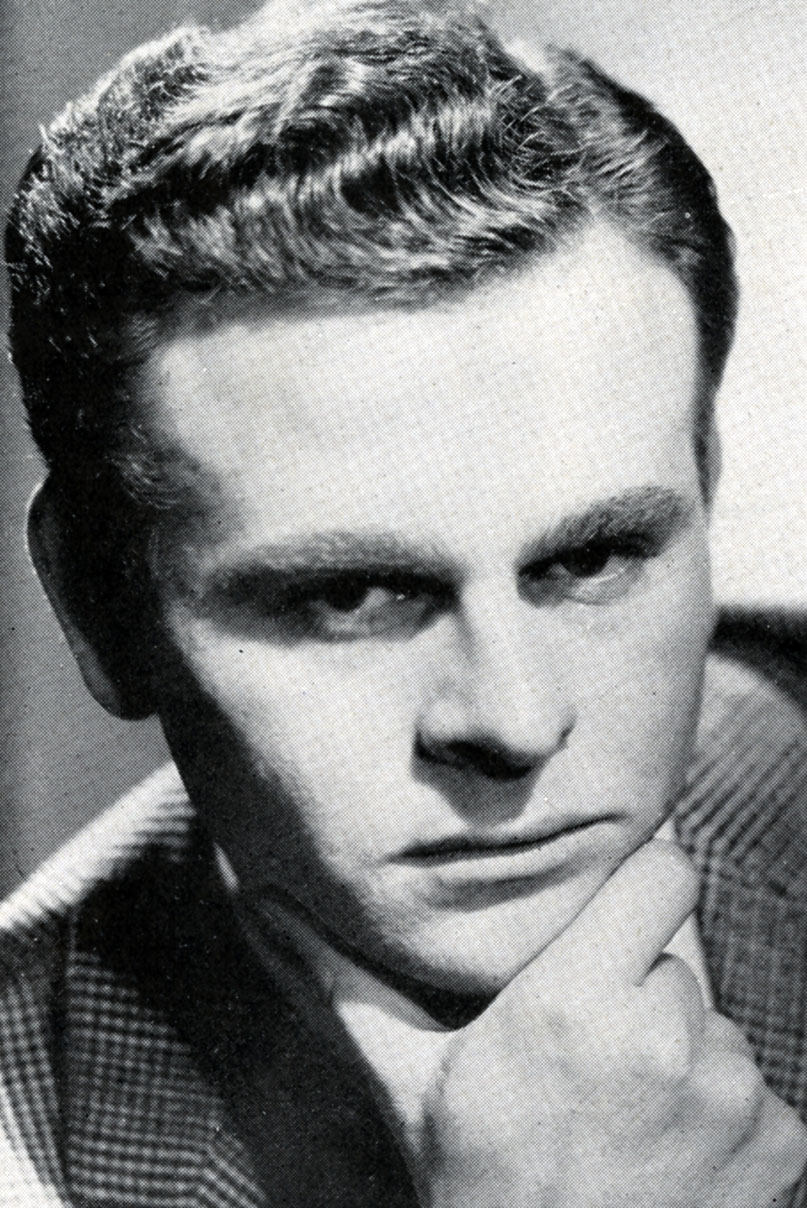
- Born: Isacco Ravaioli; 3 March 1933; Ravenna, Italy
- Died: 15 February 2004 (aged 70); Rome, Italy
- Occupation: Actor

Isacco Ravaioli, best known as Isarco Ravaioli (3 March 1933 – 15 February 2004), was an Italian film actor.

== Life and career ==
Born in Ravenna, Ravaioli obtained a diploma of teaching in his hometown, and he started working as a primary school teacher. Later, driven by his passion for cinema, he moved to Rome where he first attended the drama school held by Peter Scharoff, soon obtaining his first film roles, and then enrolled the Centro Sperimentale di Cinematografia, graduating in 1957. Ravaioli appeared in dozens of films until his retirement in the 1980s, mainly of adventure and peplum genre.

== Selected filmography ==
- La storia del fornaretto di Venezia (1952)
- La muta di Portici (1952)
- Francis the Smuggler (1953) - Marinaio al bar (uncredited)
- Capitan Fantasma (1953) - (uncredited)
- La figlia del forzato (1953)
- La schiava del peccato (1954) - (uncredited)
- Accadde di notte (1956)
- Wives and Obscurities (1956) - Giovanotto del paese
- Il bacio del sole (Don Vesuvio) (1958)
- Caporale di giornata (1958) - Soldier Rossi
- Bir kadin tuzagi (1958)
- Le confident de ces dames (1959)
- The Black Archer (1959) - Young conspirator
- La cento chilometri (1959) - Friend of Elena's Brother
- Bad Girls Don't Cry (1959)
- Perfide.... ma belle (1959)
- Il principe fusto (1960)
- The Vampire and the Ballerina (1960) - Luca
- The Warrior Empress (1960)
- Caravan petrol (1960) - Fazil's Soldier
- Un giorno da leoni (1961)
- The Valiant (1962)
- A Very Private Affair (1962)
- Vulcan, Son of Giove (1962) - Mercurius - Messenger of the Gods
- My Son, the Hero (1962) - Centinela
- 79 A.D. (1962) - Licinius
- The Old Testament (1962) - Giovanni
- La mano sul fucile (1963)
- Casablanca, Nest of Spies (1963)
- I maniaci (1964) - Eros, the Villa's Butler (segment 'Il week-end')
- Last Plane to Baalbeck (1964) - Franz
- Sandokan to the Rescue (1964) - Sitar
- Super rapina a Milano (1964)
- Squillo (1964)
- Heroes of Fort Worth (1965) - Lt. Webb
- Secret Agent 777 (1965) - Professor's Assistant
- Wild, Wild Planet (1966) - Quarters Sergeant
- War of the Planets (1966) - Hosting Victim
- Djurado (1966) - Marshal Ray Daller
- Bel Ami 2000 oder Wie verführt man einen Playboy? (1966)
- La morte viene dal pianeta Aytin (1967) - Norton's Communications Technician
- LSD - Inferno per pochi dollari (1967) - Alex Corey
- Wanted Johnny Texas (1967) - Sergeant Mills, Texas Rangers
- Danger: Diabolik (1968) - Valmont's Henchman
- Satanik (1968) - Max Bermuda
- Either All or None (1968) - Solitario
- Deadly Inheritance (1968) - Jules
- Colpo sensazionale al servizio del Sifar (1968) - Special Agent George Hansen
- Heads or Tails (1969) - Sheriff
- Quel giorno Dio non c'era (Il caso Defregger) (1969) - German Officer
- The Invincible Six (1970) - Giorgio
- Kill Django... Kill First (1971) - Doc
- I giardini del diavolo (1971) - Major Briggs
- Let's Go and Kill Sartana (1971) - Sheriff Chet Hammer
- La verità secondo Satana (1972) - Robert
- Il seme di Caino (1972) - Giovanni
- La rebelión de los bucaneros (1972)
- La vergine di Bali (1972) - Dr. Arnold
- Rivelazioni di uno psichiatra sul mondo perverso del sesso (1973) - Professor Strafford
- The Hanging Woman (1973) - Town's Mayor
- Mania (1974) - Lailo
- La linea del fiume (1976) - SS tedesco in casa del Dr. Roder
- Kaput Lager - Gli ultimi giorni delle SS (1977) - Lt. Keller
- Gli uccisori (1977) - Stephen
- Deadly Chase (1978) - Alberto Bonci, 'Il barone'
- Tough to Kill (1978)
- Quando l'amore è oscenità (1980) - Dr. Roberts
- Febbre a 40! (1980) - Robert
- Il trono di fuoco (1983) - Isar
- Il momento magico (1984) - Friend of the stripper (final film role)
