= Il trafficone =

1974 film by Bruno Corbucci

- Directed by: Bruno Corbucci
- Written by: Bruno Corbucci; Mario Amendola
- Starring: Carlo Giuffrè
- Cinematography: Guglielmo Mancori
- Music by: Ubaldo Continiello
- Release date: November 28, 1974
- Running time: 102 minutes
- Language: Italian

Il trafficone is a 1974 Italian commedia sexy all'italiana written and directed by Bruno Corbucci and starring Carlo Giuffrè.

== Plot ==
A Neapolitan Vincenzo LoRusso that lives of expedients in Rome, as he tries to sell at an intersection a faux suede jacket, accidentally meets Laura, a beautiful woman who invites him to her house. Between the two it is now a passion, but the unexpected arrival of her husband will be the beginning for Vincenzo a new experience as it will be paid by it to have been caught in bed with his wife, and unlocked it from its psychological impotence. Well briefed by the modern couple of theories of William Masters and Virginia Johnson, though without real expertise will open a sexology center to solve the problems of couples and to earn as much without ever having to make do to support his family.

== Cast ==
- Carlo Giuffrè: Vincenzo LoRusso / Dr. Gaetano D'Angelo
- Marilù Tolo: Rosalia
- Tina Aumont: Laura Vitali
- Adriana Asti: Virginia
- Enzo Cannavale: Gennaro
- Rita Calderoni: Angela, Vincenzo's wife
- Lino Banfi: Luigi Scardocchia
- Irina Maleeva: Silvana Scardocchia
- Gianni Agus: On. Rivolta
- Elio Zamuto: Baron Vito Macaluso
- Vincenzo Crocitti : Bastiano
- Pamela Villoresi : Bastiano's wife
- Renzo Marignano: Count Everardo
- Mino Guerrini: Judge Filiberto Vettiglia
- Giancarlo Badessi : The Major
- Bruno Corbucci : On. Licanzi
- Massimo Dapporto : Paziente filmato
