= Luigi Batzella =

- Born: 1924; San Sperate, Italy
- Died: 2008 (aged 83–84); San Sperate, Italy
- Other names: Ivan Kathansky, A.M. Frank
- Occupations: Film director, screenwriter actor

Luigi Batzella (1924 in San Sperate – 2008 in San Sperate) also known as Paolo Solvay was an Italian film director, editor, screenwriter and actor. He made numerous low-budget genre films.

== Life and career ==
Luigi Batzella was born in San Sperate, Sardinia in 1924. After what film historian and critic Roberto Curti described as "a nondescript career as an actor," Batzella began his career as a director in 1966 with the war film Tre franchi die pietà. After directing a few low budget westerns, Batzella directed his first horror film The Devil's Wedding Night which was directed with an uncredited Joe D'Amato. Following the release of his next horror film Nude for Satan in 1978, Batzella directed two Nazisploitation films Kaput Lager – Gli ultimi giorni delle SS and La Bestia in calore for which he was credited as Ivan Kathansky. His next feature would be the sex comedy Probito erotico starring Ajita Wilson where he is credited as Paul Selvin. His final official film credit was for the film Strategia per una missione di morte where he is credited as Kathansky in some prints and as A.M. Frank in the French version. Curti has stated that some sources claim Batzella was involved with the Bruce Le production Mie ju que que. Batzella died in San Sperate in 2008 at the age of 84.

== Partial filmography ==
Title	Year	Credited as					Notes	Ref(s)
Title	Year	Director	Screenwriter	Film editor	Actor	Other	Notes	Ref(s)
Slaughter of the Vampires	1962				Yes		as "Dr. Nietzsche"	
Hawk of the Caribbean	1962				Yes		as "Pirate"	
The Saracens	1963				Yes		as "Mahmud"	
Zorikan the Barbarian	1964				Yes			
The Last Gun	1964				Yes			
Django's Cut Price Corpses	1971	Yes	Yes					
God Is My Colt .45	1972	Yes	Yes					
The Devil's Wedding Night	1973	Yes	Yes					
Nude for Satan	1974	Yes	Yes	Yes				
The Bloodsucker Leads the Dance	1975				Yes		as "Police Inspector"	
Special Squad Shoots on Sight	1976			Yes				
La Bestia in calore	1977	Yes	Yes	Yes				
Kaput Lager – Gli ultimi giorni delle SS	1977	Yes	Yes	Yes				
Strategia per una missione di morte	—N/a	Yes	Yes	Yes				

== Footnotes ==
=== References ===
- Curti, Roberto (2013). Italian Crime Filmography, 1968-1980. McFarland. ISBN 978-0786469765.
- Curti, Roberto (2015). Italian Gothic Horror Films, 1957-1969. McFarland. ISBN 978-1476619897.
- Curti, Roberto (2017). Italian Gothic Horror Films, 1970-1979. McFarland. ISBN 978-1476629605.
- Grant, Kevin (2011). Any Gun Can Play. Fab Press. ISBN 9781903254615.
- Kinnard, Roy; Crnkovich, Tony (2017). Italian Sword and Sandal Films, 1908-1990. McFarland. ISBN 978-1476662916.
