= Piero Zuffi =

Italian scenographer (1919–2006)

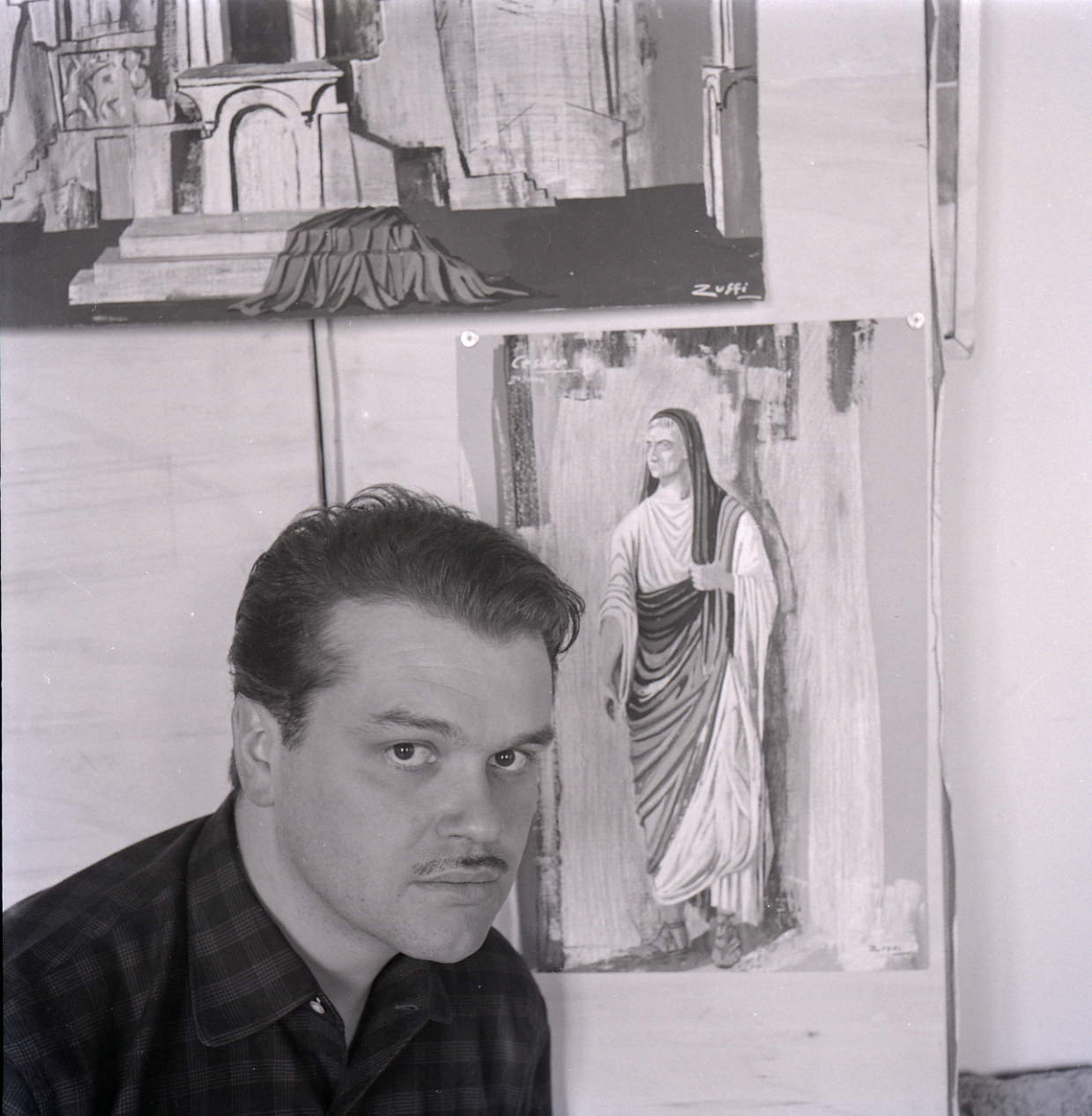
Piero Zuffi photographed by Paolo Monti.

Piero Zuffi (28 April 1919 – 2006) was an Italian set designer and painter.

Born in Imola, Zuffi formed as a painter in Latin America. After a few years settled in Paris, in 1952 he moved to Milan, where he started collaborating with the Piccolo Teatro as a set designer. In 1954 he made the sets and costumes for a representation of the Christoph Willibald Gluck's opera Alceste, starring Maria Callas, then starting a decade-long collaboration with La Scala. His sets were characterized by fixed structures, lack of curtain and changes in vision. Also active in films, he wrote and directed a crime film in 1970, The Syndicate: A Death in the Family.
