= Mania (1974 film) =

- Directed by: Renato Polselli
- Screenplay by: Renato Polselli
- Produced by: Renato Polselli; Mushi Glam
- Cinematography: Ugo Brunelli
- Edited by: Roberto Colangeli
- Music by: Umberto Cannone
- Production company: G.R.P. Cinematografica
- Distributed by: RCR
- Release date: 24 August 1974 (Italy)
- Running time: 84 minutes
- Country: Italy

Mania is a 1974 Italian film produced, written and directed by Renato Polselli.

== Production ==
The film was developed under the working title Terrore mania. It was a low-budget affair with no well-known actors cast. Lead Ettore Elio Aricò, who had appeared in a previous film of Polselli's, provided most of the money for the film himself on the condition that he was cast as the protagonist .

Although the opening credits state that the film was shot at Cave Film Studio in Rome, it was predominantly shot around Isarco Ravaioli's home.

== Release ==
Mania was released theatrically in Italy on 24 August 1974, where it was distributed by RCR. Louis Paul described Mania as a "seldom-seen thriller". Polselli stated the lack of availability was due to Aricò's dissatisfaction with the distribution which led him to take the film out of circulation.

Paul also mentioned that it was rumoured to have been released on home video with hardcore pornography sequences added. The film has remained unseen for several years with a rare theatrical screening at Trevi cinema in Rome in May 2007.
