= Attack of the Beast Creatures =

1985 film

- 1985 VHS cover art
- Directed by: Michael Stanley
- Written by: Robert A. Hutton
- Produced by: Michael Stanley; William R. Szlinsky
- Starring: Robert Nolfi; Julia Rust; Robert Lengyel; Lisa Pak; Frank Murgalo; John Vichiola; Kay Bailey; Frans Kal; Robert T. Firgelewski
- Cinematography: Robert A. Hutton
- Edited by: Robert A. Hutton; Michael Stanley
- Music by: John P. Mozzi
- Production company: Obelisk Motion Pictures
- Distributed by: Joseph Brenner Associates Inc.
- Release date: 12 July 1985 (United States)
- Running time: 84 minutes
- Country: United States
- Language: English

Attack of the Beast Creatures (also known as Hell Island, and Beast Creatures) is a 1985 American independent horror film produced, and directed by Michael Stanley. It stars Robert Nolfi, Julia Rust, Robert Lengyel, Lisa Pak, and Frank Murgalo. The film centers on a group of survivors who wash up on the shores of a seemingly deserted island in 1920, after their ship capsizes. While there, it slowly becomes apparent that the island is home to a tribe of small doll-like creatures, who begin stalking and killing the survivors one by one.

The film was developed from an idea by producer William Szlinsky, who approached Stanley with a possible scene for a film involving a man's face being eaten away by acid. Feeling that this would make a great scene for a horror film, Stanley came up with the idea of an island inhabited by a tribe of doll-like monsters that killed anyone who came there.

Principal photography began sometime in 1983, in Stamford, Connecticut, with a majority of the film's cast being inexperienced actors. Although completed in 1983, the film remained in distribution hell until 1985, when it was picked up by Joseph Brenner who specialized in distributing independent and foreign films. Originally intended to be released under the title Hell Island, it was subsequently changed to its current title on Brenner's insistence, who released the film with little promotion on July 12, 1985. It was largely ignored by mainstream critics and otherwise received largely negative reviews. Over the years, some critics have commended the film for its enthusiastic approach, and cheesy B-movie charm, and it has gained a small cult following.

== Plot ==
In the summer of 1920, a cruise ship sinks in the North Atlantic. A lifeboat carrying nine survivors washes up on the shores of a seemingly deserted island. It slowly becomes apparent that the island is not as uninhabited as the group had previously thought as they are, in turn, stalked and killed by a tribe of small doll-like creatures.

== Cast ==
- Robert Nolfi as John Trieste
- Julia Rust as Cathy
- Robert Lengyel as Case Quinn
- Lisa Pak as Diane
- Frank Murgalo as Philip
- John Vichiola as Mr. Morgan
- Kay Bailey as Mrs. Gordon
- Frans Kal as Pat
- Robert T. Firgelewski as Mr. Bruin

== Production ==
Attack of the Beast Creatures was directed by Michael Stanley, (Note: Not to be confused with to American singer-songwriter, musician, and radio personality Michael Stanley) who also served as co-producer, and editor for the film. At the time of the film's development, Stanley was struggling to find a good enough project to work on. Stanley revealed in a 2005 interview with Greg Ropp that he was "going through one script after another" before producer William "Bill" Szlinsky approached him with a possible scene for a film, featuring a man having his face burned or eaten off by acid. Feeling that this would make a great scene for a horror film, Stanley came up with the idea of an island inhabited by a tribe of doll-like monsters that killed anyone who came there. The film's script was written by Robert A. Hutton, under the title Hell Island.

Principal photography began sometime in 1983, in Stamford, Connecticut, with a largely inexperienced cast. The title antagonists were puppets designed by Hutton, with both Stanley and Robert T. Firgelewski puppeteering them during filming. The film's key sequence featuring one of the survivors having their face eaten away by acid was accomplished by attaching cotton to the actor's face with spirit glue, and layering it with liquid latex and fake blood, with the whole process taking about forty-five minutes to complete. Some of the cast and crew members were unsure about the film's tone, with some feeling that it should be played as a comedy. However, Stanley was adamant that the film should be played in a serious tone as opposed to a comical one, reasoning out that if the film's serious tone did not end up working, then it "might work as a camp". At one point during production, the filmmakers considered making a sequel to the film, but this idea was subsequently scrapped. The film's ending was constructed during shooting after the crew realized that two hundred feet of film reel (approximately fourteen to sixteen minutes of film runtime), which included an action sequence, had become damaged in the camera and was therefore unusable. Running out of film reel, Joanne, director Stanley's wife, came up with the idea to have the ending be a flashback sequence after remembering a similar ending that was done in Invaders from Mars.

== Release ==
Although Beast Creatures was completed in 1983, it remained shelved for two years before it was picked up for distribution by Joseph Brenner, whose company Joseph Brenner Associates specialized in distributing independent and foreign films. Brenner had earlier distributed films such as the Hong Kong science fiction film Infra-Man (1975), and the original Texas Chain Saw Massacre for a short time in 1977. The filmmakers had originally planned to release the film under the title Hell Island, however Brenner, the film's distributor, felt that it was not catchy enough. After they threw out other suggestions for possible titles, which included Beast Creatures, before Brenner decided upon Attack of the Beast Creatures as its new title. It was released in the United States on VHS by World Video Pictures Inc. on July 12, 1985. It was released on VHS in West Germany by Rebell Video in 1988, under the alternate titles, Beast Creatures, and Hell Island. These copies of the film have long since been out of print, and are considered extremely rare. The film subsequently fell into obscurity, which Stanley would later attribute to distributor Brenner's lack of promotion for the film. In 2006, Stanley worked with producer Szlinsky to release the film for the first time on DVD, which was made available through order on the official website for the film. The website has since fallen out of commission as of 2020.

In 2023, a full restoration of Beast Creatures was produced by American Genre Film Archive, using its original 16mm negative and was released on Blu-ray on February 28, 2023. The release featured additional content, including partial commentary with director Mike Stanley, interviews with Stanley and writer Robert Hutton, test footage, and the preserved VHS version of the film.

Beast Creatures was screened in 2005, at the Eerie Horror Film Festival, which was followed by a Q&A with director Stanley. It was later screened on March 29, 2015, at the Alamo Drafthouse, as a part of its Video Vortex series.

== Reception ==
As with many direct-to-video releases, as well as its general lack of availability, Attack of the Beast Creatures has been largely ignored by mainstream critics. Blockbuster Inc.'s Guide to Movies and Videos panned the film, giving it one out of four stars. Jim Craddock from VideoHound's Golden Movie Retriever gave the film a WOOF!, their lowest rating. John Stanley, in his book Creature Features: The Science Fiction, Fantasy, and Horror Movie Guide, awarded the film two out of four stars, stating that the film was good for a few unintentional laughs.

Alternatively, some critics have commended the film for its enthusiastic approach and cheesy B-movie charm. In his 1989 review of the film, Joe Kane of The New York Daily News found the film "hilarious", referring to it as a "camp classic". Jon Condit of Dread Central gave the film a score of three out of five, calling it "a genuinely nutty attempt at low budget monster movie-making". Condit also noted that in spite of the film's many flaws, its goofy charm made it highly enjoyable. Fred Beldin from Allmovie gave the film a similar review, stating "Attack of the Beast Creatures "will seem monotonous to some viewers, but there are enjoyably odd moments to savor". The Psychotronic Video Guide's Michael Weldon found the film's cheesiness enjoyable, while also comparing the title monsters to the killer doll in the television film Trilogy of Terror. Reviewing the film at its Video Vortex screening, Joseph A. Ziemba of Birth.Movies.Death gave the film a positive review, commending the film for its ambition, calling it "a triumph of enthusiastic ambition and amateur aesthetics". Thomas Scalzo from Not Coming to a Theater Near You commended director Stanley's enthusiasm, which Scalzo felt was clearly visible throughout the film, as well as the film's B-movie charm.

== Legacy ==
Attack of the Beast Creatures marked Stanley's only directorial effort for several decades, who left the film industry to pursue a career in theatre. For the next twenty-five years Stanley worked as a theatre director and occasional actor, directing several plays, including the New York premiere of The Smoking Room. In 2006, Stanley returned to film to direct the comedy Doing Agatha. Over the years, Beast Creatures would gain a small cult following, and is considered by some to be an obscure classic in bad cinema.

== See also ==
- Trilogy of Terror

== Sources ==
=== Books ===
- Anon. (September 1, 1994). Blockbuster Video guide to movies and videos, 1995. Dell Publishing. ISBN 978-0-440-21766-4.
- Albright, Brian (November 8, 2012). Regional Horror Films, 1958-1990: A State-by-State Guide with Interviews. McFarland & Company. ISBN 978-1-4766-0042-0.
- Charles, John (June 14, 2015). The Hong Kong Filmography, 1977-1997: A Reference Guide to 1,100 Films Produced by British Hong Kong Studios. McFarland & Company. ISBN 978-1-4766-0262-2.
- Craddock, Jim (August 2001). VideoHound's Golden Movie Retriever: 2002. Visible Ink Press. ISBN 978-0-7876-5755-0.
- Macor, Alison (February 22, 2010). Chainsaws, Slackers, and Spy Kids: Thirty Years of Filmmaking in Austin, Texas. University of Texas Press. ISBN 978-0-292-77829-0.
- Stanley, John (2000). Creature Features: The Science Fiction, Fantasy, and Horror Movie Guide. Berkley Boulevard Books. ISBN 978-0-425-17517-0.
- Thrower, Stephen (July 24, 2007). Nightmare USA: The Untold Story of the Exploitation Independents. FAB Press. ISBN 978-1-903254-52-3.
- Vogl, Peter (October 17, 2018). The Big Book of Little Horror: A Film Encyclopedia (in German). BoD – Books on Demand. ISBN 978-3-945378-49-6.
- Weldon, Michael (1996). The Psychotronic Video Guide To Film. St. Martin's Press. ISBN 978-0-312-13149-4.

=== Periodicals ===
- Hunt, Dennis (November 14, 1986). "Video Log:'Gods Must Be Crazy' Drops into Video Stores; "SpaceCamp' is Set for Modest Blast-Off". Los Angeles Times. Los Angeles, California. p. 18 – via Newspapers.com (subscription required).
- Kane, Joe (January 25, 1989). "Zonked out on 'Crime Zone'". New York Daily News. New York City. p. 39 – via Newspapers.com (subscription required).
