= The Eerie Midnight Horror Show =

1974 film directed by Mario Gariazzo

- Italian: L'Ossessa
- Directed by: Mario Gariazzo
- Screenplay by: Ambrogio Molteni
- Story by: Mario Gariazzo
- Produced by: Paolo Azzoni; Riccardo Romano
- Starring: Stella Carnacina; Chris Avram; Lucretia Love; Ivan Rassimov; Luigi Pistilli
- Cinematography: Carlo Carlini
- Edited by: Roberto Colangeli
- Music by: Marcello Giombini
- Production company: Tiberia Film
- Distributed by: Overseas Film (Italy)
- Release date: 6 November 1974
- Running time: 90 minutes
- Country: Italy
- Language: Italian

The Eerie Midnight Horror Show (Italian: L'Ossessa, lit. 'The Possessed Woman', also released as Enter the Devil, The Tormented, and The Sexorcist) is a 1974 Italian horror film directed by Mario Gariazzo, and starring Stella Carnacina, Chris Avram, Lucretia Love, Ivan Rassimov and Luigi Pistilli. It is widely-regarded as a cash-in on The Exorcist.

== Plot ==
Daniela, an art student in Italy, visits an abandoned, deconsecrated church to view life-size wooden sculptures of the crucifixion uncovered there. Along with her art professor, Daniela purchases one of the sculptures and brings it to the campus art studio. That night, Daniela attends a house party held by her parents, where she witnesses her mother engaging in sadomasochistic sex in one of the bedrooms with Mario, her lover. Disturbed by what she has witnessed, Daniela returns to the art studio to work. While painting, she has a vision of the statue of the man coming to life and seducing her.

After, Daniela meets her boyfriend, Carlo, for dinner. Upon returning home, she is accosted by something unseen in the stairwell. Upon entering her apartment, she begins masturbating furiously. Her parents later find her in bed, writhing and scratching herself violently. She attempts to initiate sex with her father, after which he slaps her in the face. After being sedated, Daniela dreams of driving with her parents into the countryside, during which their car has a tire blowout near an abandoned cathedral. As her father repairs the tire, Daniela wanders into the cathedral, where an artist is performing restorations. Daniela wanders into catacombs, where she has a vision of three women sacrificing another for the man she earlier witnessed manifest from the statue; the cultists address the man as Satan. Daniela drinks from a cup offered to her, before the man crucifies her.

Daniela awakens from the dream, violently screaming. Her parents summon a doctor, who finds stigmata on Daniela's hands; however, the wounds miraculously disappear the next day. After a priest determines Daniela may be possessed, she is taken to a remote Catholic convent in the mountains to undergo an exorcism. When the nuns recite Latin prayer in the chapel, Daniela goes mad and flees, but is stopped in town. Sequestered in the mothers superior's quarters, Daniela is approached by Father Xeno, a priest, and she attempts to seduce and fellate him. In his room, Father Xeno flagellates himself as penance.

In a second attempt to exorcise Daniela, Father Xeno is attacked by her with a chain, which she repeatedly whips him with. She begins to violently foam at the mouth upon seeing his crucifix. Father Xeno ultimately dies during the exorcism, but Daniela is saved.

== Cast ==
- Stella Carnacina as Daniela
- Chris Avram as Mario
- Lucretia Love as Luisa
- Ivan Rassimov as the Demon
- Luigi Pistilli as Father Xeno
- Gianrico Tondinelli as Carlo
- Umberto Raho as Psychiatrist
- Piero Gerlini as Rev. Antonio
- Giuseppe Addobbati as Doctor
- Gabriele Tinti as Luisa's lover
- Maria Teresa Piaggio as Mother Superior
- Lisa Mantellini as Gina
- Bruna Beani as Priestess

== Production ==
The film was shot on-location in Rome, Viterbo, and the town of Rocca di Papa. Several scenes were shot at the British School at Rome. An uncredited Carlo Rambaldi designed the crucified-demon animatronic in the film.

== Release ==
A version with hardcore pornographic inserts called Sexorcist Devil was also released.
