= White Slave (film) =

- Italian theatrical release poster
- Italian: Schiave bianche – Violenza in Amazzonia
- Directed by: Roy Garrett
- Written by: Franco Prosperi
- Starring: Elvire Audray; Will Gonzales; Dick Campbell; Andrea Coppola
- Cinematography: Silvano Ippoliti
- Edited by: Gianfranco Amicucci
- Music by: Franco Campanino
- Distributed by: DMV Distribuzione
- Release date: 9 August 1985 (Italy)
- Running time: 90 minutes
- Country: Italy
- Languages: Italian; English

White Slave (Italian: Schiave bianche – Violenza in Amazzonia) is a 1985 Italian cannibal romantic horror film directed by Mario Gariazzo (under the name Roy Garrett) and starring Elvire Audray, Will Gonzalez, Dick Campbell and Andrea Coppola.

The film is also known as Amazonia: The Catherine Miles Story and Cannibal Holocaust 2: The Catherine Miles Story (in Spain and Germany).

== Plot ==
Catherine Miles is a 17-year-old student sent by her parents to study in London to perfect the language. At the end of the course, Catherine goes on vacation to the Amazon and her parents organize a boat trip on the occasion of Catherine's 18th birthday, in which Catherine's uncle and aunt also go, but in another boat. During the trip, the boat is attacked by natives and Catherine's parents are beheaded. She is taken as a prisoner by a group of natives, led by the young warrior Umukai.

After days of an interminable walk, they arrive at the village of the natives and immediately Catherine is sold by the head of the tribe to the richest native of the tribe. However, Umukai offers himself as a slave in order to be allowed to take Catherine as a woman, but the native who had bought Catherine rejects the offer and decides to take the girl as his woman. When the native tries to possess Catherine by force, she is defended by Umukai. In a fight, Umukai manages to kill the native. So according to the customs of the tribe, Catherine becomes the woman of Umukai. However, she hates Umukai because she believes that his tribe, led by him, were the ones who killed her parents.

Despite their differences, Catherine remains with the tribe so that she can survive, where she starts wearing only a grass loincloth and tribal necklaces. In the tribe also lives a young native woman who is the sister of Umukai. She speaks the very basic language of Catherine due to having been used as part of a missionary event, so Catherine only has communication with her and they become very good friends. Umukai, who is deeply in love with Catherine, does everything possible to win her love.

With the help of his sister, Umukai learns the language of Catherine. Next, Catherine tells Umukai that she holds him accountable for the death of her parents; he then explains to her that he saw some white people and other natives who were not from his tribe murder her parents. In this way, Catherine understands that Umukai was innocent and that she is also in love with Umukai, who agrees to accompany her to the lands of her dead parents.

When arriving there, Catherine realizes that her uncle and aunt have taken possession of the lands and it is clear to her that they were the assassins in order to keep the lands. She enters the room where her uncle and aunt are sleeping and murders them in an act of revenge. Umukai sees what Catherine did and comments that the women belonging to the tribe could not kill anyone. Not willing to go against his tribe, he had to renounce Catherine's love. This caused Catherine to jump off his boat, swim to shore, and turn herself over to the authorities.

Catherine is prosecuted for the murder at the trial that was used in the framing wraparound. Her appointed lawyer states that Catherine is issuing the insanity plea, which the judge accepts.

After serving her small sentence in an asylum, Catherine leaves the Amazon and returns to London. She marries an architect named Armstrong from there, and they have a daughter, but she never manages to forget Umukai, who the narrator claims committed suicide by drowning.

== Cast ==
- Elvire Audray: Catherine Miles
- Will Gonzales: Umukai
- Andrea Coppola: Catherine's uncle
- Dick Campbell:
- Dick Marshall:
- Alma Vernon:
- Grace Williams:
- Sara Fleszer:
- Mark Cannon:
- James Boyle:
- Peter Robyns:
- Jessica Bridges:
- Stephanie Walters:
- Neal Berger:
- Deborah Savage:
- Kim Arnold:
- Rik Battaglia: Catherine's father (uncredited)

== Background ==
The film is supposedly based on a true story.

== Critical reception ==
The film received mixed critical response, one review of the time judging it was "crude, with a story that was not well told and that it was often falling into the ludicrous"

== See also ==
- Cannibal film
- Cannibal Holocaust
- List of Italian films of 1985
- List of horror films of 1985
