= San Sperate =

San Sperate Santu Sperau (Sardinian)
- Comune
- Comune di San Sperate
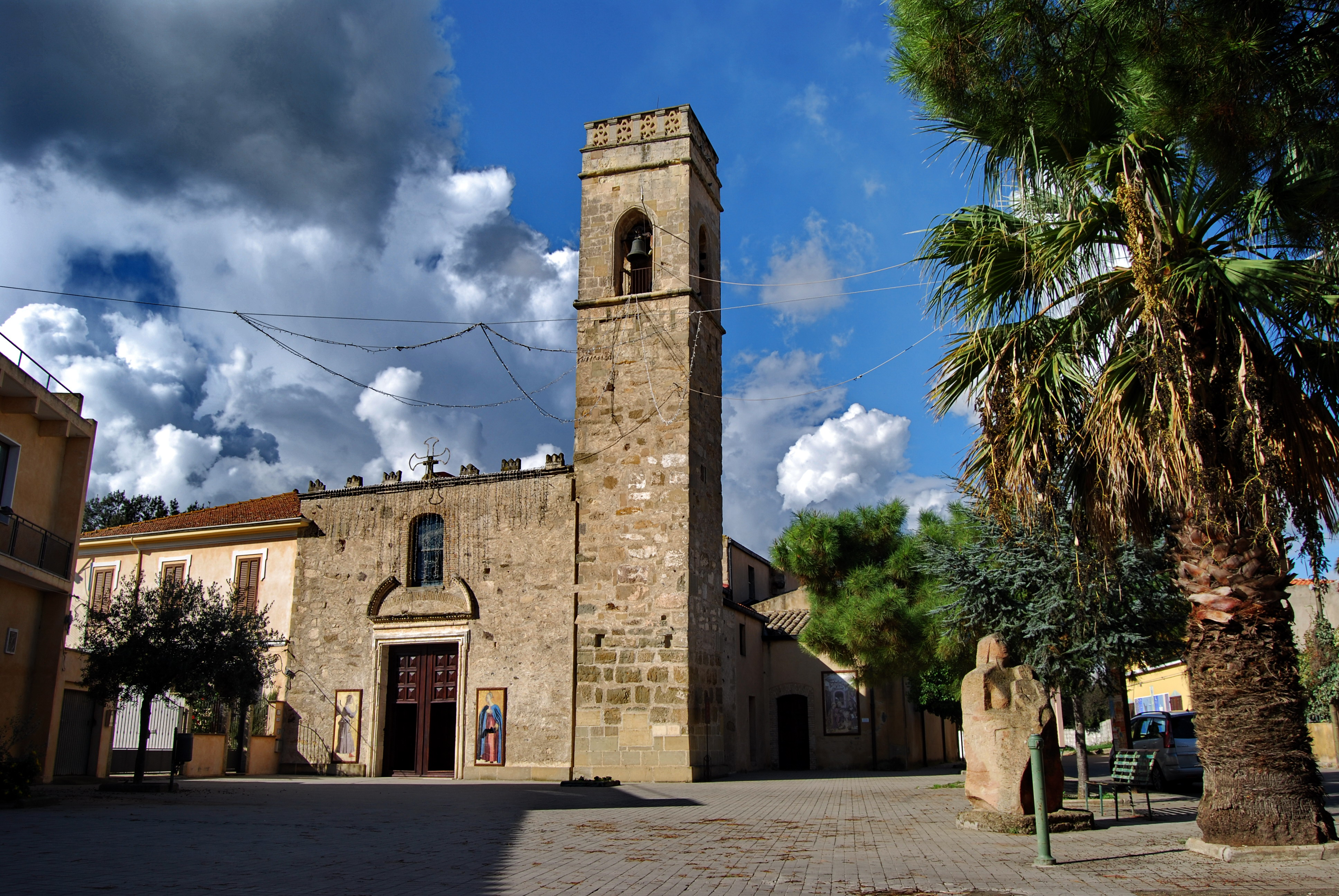
- Church of San Sperate

- Location within Sardinia
- Coordinates: 39°22′N 9°0′E
- Country: Italy
- Region: Sardinia
- Metropolitan city: Cagliari (CA)

Area
  - Total: 26.24 km^{2} (10.13 sq mi)

Population (2026)
  - Total: 8,625
  - Density: 328.7/km^{2} (851.3/sq mi)
- Demonym: Sansperatini o Speradesus
- Time zone: UTC+1 (CET)
  - Summer (DST): UTC+2 (CEST)
- Postal code: 09026
- Dialing code: 070
- Website: Official website

San Sperate (Sardinian: Santu Sperau) is a town and comune (municipality) in the Metropolitan City of Cagliari in the autonomous island region of Sardinia in Italy, located about 20 kilometres (12 mi) northwest of Cagliari. It has 8,625 inhabitants.

San Sperate borders the municipalities of Assemini, Decimomannu, Monastir, Sestu, and Villasor.

== Demographics ==
As of 2026, the population is 8,625, of which 50.1% are male, and 49.9% are female. Minors make up 14.2% of the population, and seniors make up 22.8%.

Historical population

| Year | Pop. | ±% |
|---|---|---|
| 1861 | 1,876 | — |
| 1871 | 1,772 | −5.5% |
| 1881 | 1,866 | +5.3% |
| 1901 | 1,884 | +1.0% |
| 1911 | 2,272 | +20.6% |
| 1921 | 2,565 | +12.9% |
| 1931 | 2,872 | +12.0% |
| 1936 | 2,861 | −0.4% |

| Year | Pop. | ±% |
|---|---|---|
| 1951 | 3,676 | +28.5% |
| 1961 | 4,247 | +15.5% |
| 1971 | 4,978 | +17.2% |
| 1981 | 5,916 | +18.8% |
| 1991 | 6,468 | +9.3% |
| 2001 | 6,821 | +5.5% |
| 2011 | 7,972 | +16.9% |
| 2021 | 8,398 | +5.3% |

Source: ISTAT

=== Immigration ===
As of 2025, the foreign-born population is 243, making up 2.8% of the total population. The 5 largest foreign countries of origin are Romania (27), Germany (20), Switzerland (17), Ukraine (16) and France (12).
