= Hawk of the Caribbean =

1962 film by Piero Regnoli

- Directed by: Piero Regnoli
- Screenplay by: Piero Regnoli
- Starring: Johnny Desmond; Yvonne Monlaur
- Cinematography: Aldo Greci
- Music by: Aldo Piga
- Production companies: Nord Film Italiana; Remarch Film
- Release date: 5 April 1962 (Italy)
- Running time: 115 minutes
- Country: Italy
- Language: Italian

Hawk of the Caribbean (Italian: Lo sparviero dei Caraibi), also known as Caribbean Hawk, is a 1962 Italian pirate film written and directed by Piero Regnoli and starring Johnny Desmond and Yvonne Monlaur.

== Plot ==
The Spanish government is forced to ask a group of ex-slaves for help when it is threatened by the English.

== Cast ==
- Johnny Desmond as Juan Rodrigo Olivares
- Yvonne Monlaur as Arica Mageiras
- Armando Francioli as Esteban
- Piero Lulli as Manuel
- Franca Parisi as Donna Maria de la Rey Sandoval
- Walter Brandi as Ramon
- Elvi Lissiak as Lolita
- Vincenzo Musolino as Rodriguez
- Graziella Granata as Flora
- Amedeo Trilli as Pablo
- Franco Santi as Pedrito
- Nerio Bernardi
- Nino Marchesini as Viceking of Santa Cruz
- Carlo Lombardi as Captain Pinto
- Claudio Undari as Don Pedro de Alicante

== Production ==
Yvonne Monlaur stated that the film went through production difficulties which caused a month long halt to filming. This led to many scripted scenes left unfilmed.

== Release ==
Hawk of the Caribbean was released in Italy on 5 April 1962.
