= Black Magic Rites =

- Directed by: Renato Polselli
- Screenplay by: Renato Polselli
- Story by: Renato Polselli
- Produced by: Renato Polselli
- Starring: Mickey Hargitay; Rita Calderoni; Raoul Lovecchio; Krysta Barrymore
- Cinematography: Ugo Brunelli
- Edited by: Renato Polselli
- Music by: Gian Franco Reverberi; Romolo Forlai
- Production company: G.R.P. Cinematografica
- Distributed by: Primula Cinematografica
- Release date: 17 January 1973 (Italy)
- Running time: 98 minutes
- Country: Italy
- Box office: ₤68.080 million

Black Magic Rites (Italian: Riti, magie nere e segrete orge nel Trecento..., lit. 'Rites, black magic and secret orgies in the fourteenth century...') is a 1973 Italian film directed by Renato Polselli. Produced under the title of La reincarnazione, the film was shot between December 1971 and January 1972 in Italy. It was originally submitted for review for Italian Film censorship board twice in 1972 when it was eventually passed in November 11.

The film was released on home video as The Reincarnation of Isabel and Black Magic Rites.

== Production ==
Under its original production title of La reincarnazione, the film began shooting between December 1971 and January 1972 at Castle Piccolomini and at Elios Film Studios in Rome. According to Polselli, the film was shot in either five or six weeks.

== Release ==
The film initially had trouble with the Italian censor board. It was initially submitted on 31 July 1972 and again on 11 August, where it was again rejected with the censors stating that the film "consists of a rambling series of sadistic sequences, meant to urge, through extreme cruelty mixed with degenerate eroticism, the lowest sexual instincts". Polselli shortened the film, which led to its passing on November 11.

Black Magic Rites was released in Italy as Riti, magie nere e segrete orge nel Trecento... where it was distributed theatrically by Primula Cinematografica on 17 January 1973. The film's new title was an attempt to exploit the current popular trend of "Decamerotics", which were sex comedies set in the Middle Ages that became popular since the release of the film The Decameron. The film had a domestic gross of 68,080,000 Italian lire which Curti described as being poor.

Along with it theatrical release in January, a photonovel version of the novel was released in Cinesex mese #1, using the original title of La reincarnazione. Louis Paul, author of Italian Horror Film Directors, stated that the film was considered lost for decades, until it appeared in 1998 on an Italian video in a 55 minute long version. It was later released to home video by the British home video label Redemption under the titles The Reincarnation of Isabel and Black Magic Rites.

== Reception ==
From retrospective reviews, Curti described the film as bordering on the incomprehensible, noting that "there is no real storyline to speak of, but a series of barely connected scenes: the vampires [...] abducting and torturing their nubile victims during the cycle of the full moon; the other characters wandering around the castle; and lots and lots of talk." Writer Scott Aaron Stine echoed the plotless statements, saying that the film had "no story, no real narrative" and just "offers bits of filler between scenes of gratuitous sex and violence." Louis Paul summarized the film as having actors "staring off into the camera, sometimes about to break into laughter" and scenes of "near pornographic sexual encounters taking place every ten minutes or so, the film seems amateurish and unwatchable."

AllMovie gave the film a three and a half star rating out of five, describing the film as a "bewildering fever-dream procession of Sadean images drenched in psychedelic candy colors by cinematographer Ugo Brunelli." The review commented on the plot, stating that "conventional genre film admirers may find the proceedings baffling and a mite pretentious, one cannot argue that Polselli has a particular talent for combining Gothic horror with disturbing and often indelible erotic imagery."

== See also ==
- List of Italian films of 1973

== Footnotes ==
=== References ===
- Paul, Louis (2005). Italian Horror Film Directors. McFarland. ISBN 978-0-7864-8749-3.
- Curti, Roberto (2017). Italian Gothic Horror Films, 1970–1979. McFarland. ISBN 978-1476629605.
- Stine, Scott Aaron (2001). The Gorehound's Guide to Splatter Films of the 1960s and 1970s. McFarland. ISBN 078649140X.
