= Roberto Mauri =

Italian actor, director and screenwriter (1924–2018)

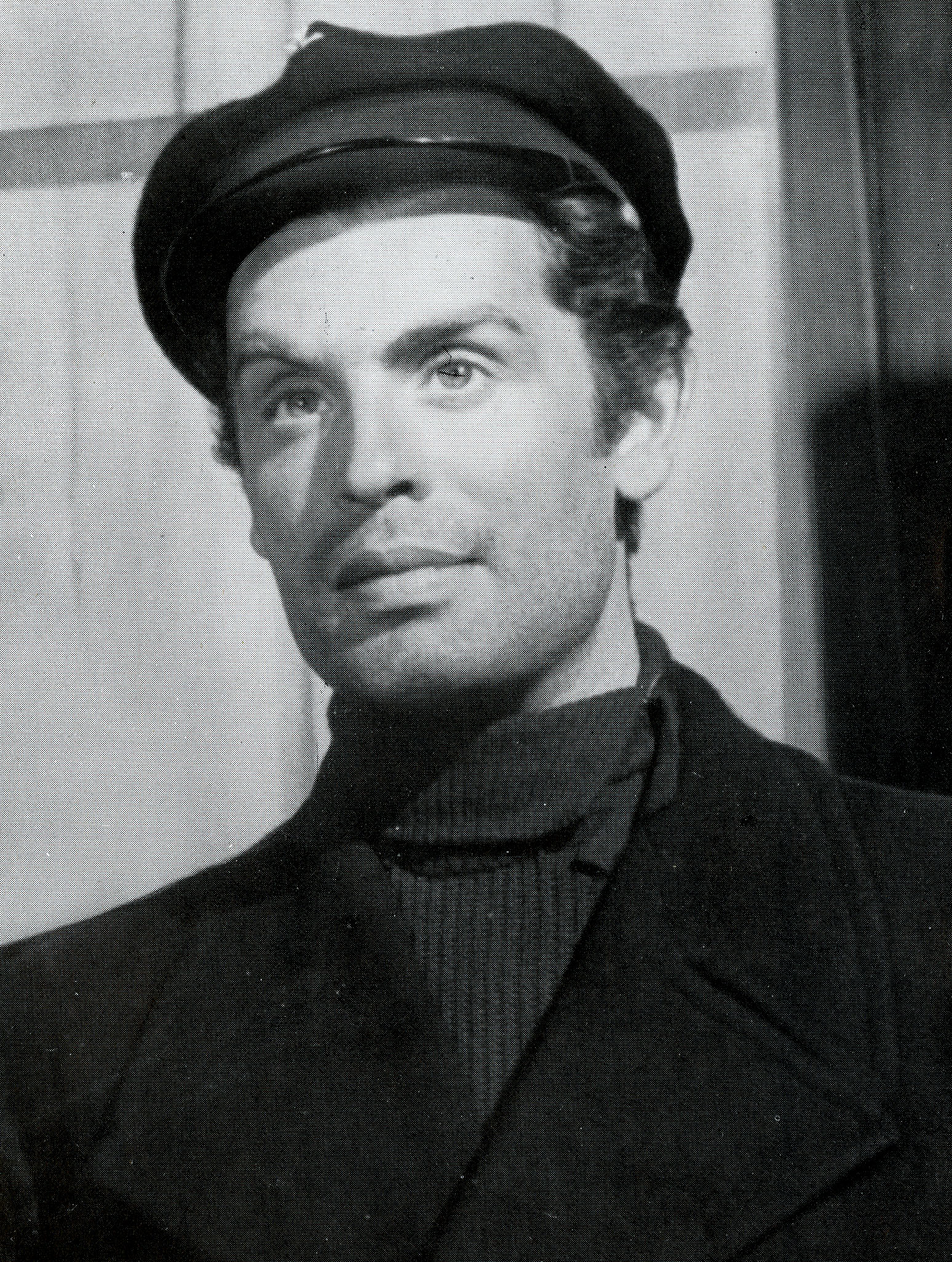
- Mauri in 1953
- Born: Giuseppe Tagliavia; 8 February 1924; Castelvetrano, Italy
- Died: 18 February 2018 (aged 94); Rome, Italy
- Occupations: Actor, film director, screenwriter

Roberto Mauri (8 February 1924 – 18 February 2018) was an Italian actor, film director and screenwriter.

== Life and career ==
Born Giuseppe Tagliavia in Castelvetrano, Trapani, Mauri began his career as a film actor in low-budget films, occasionally even playing main roles. He debuted as a director co-directing with Andrea Bianchi the crime film La legge del mitra, in which he was also an actor. Mainly active between the 1960s and the first half of the 1970s, Mauri specialized in the Spaghetti Western genre, in which he was sometimes credited as Robert Johnson. He died in Rome, Italy on 18 February 2018, at the age of 94.

== Selected filmography ==
Actor

- Apparition (1943)
- The Devil's Gondola (1946)
- The Opium Den (1947)
- They Were Three Hundred (1952)
- Francis the Smuggler (1953)
- La pattuglia dell'Amba Alagi (1953)

Director and screenwriter

- Slaughter of the Vampires (1962)
- Three Swords for Rome (1964)
- The Invincible Brothers Maciste (1964)
- Night of Violence (1965)
- Vengeance Is My Forgiveness (1968)
- Kong Island (1968)
- Sartana in the Valley of Death (1970)
- Wanted Sabata (1970)
- He Was Called Holy Ghost (1971)
- Ivanhoe, the Norman Swordsman (1971)
- Madeleine: Anatomy of a Nightmare (1974)
