= Renato Polselli =

Italian screenwriter, film director and film producer

- Born: 26 February 1922; Arce, Lazio, Italy
- Died: 1 October 2006 (aged 84); Rome, Italy
- Other names: Ralph Browne
- Occupation(s): Screenwriter, film director

Renato Polselli (1922–2006) was an Italian film director and writer. Born in Arce, Lazio on 26 February 1922, Polselli began directing films in Italy in the early 1950s. He is best known for directing and writing the film The Vampire and the Ballerina. Polselli's film work since the 1970s was sporadic, and included work on horror film productions that remained unfinished. His later film works were often pornography made with his frequent collaborator Bruno Vanni. Polselli died in Italy on 1 October 2006.

== Style ==
In his book on Italian horror film directors, Louis Paul described Polselli as being "a bit of a mystery" due to the rarity of films surrounding his work and that his work in horror films were "some of the most original, hallucinatory and sleazy, low-budget productions in the genre". Paul described his early efforts such as The Vampire and the Ballerina and The Vampire of the Opera as following the trends of Italian horror films of that era, with overtly sexual themes and being influenced by Hammer Horror films of the era.

== Select filmography ==
Title	Year	Credited as				Notes	Ref(s)
Title	Year	Director	Screenplay	Story	Other	Notes	Ref(s)
The Vampire and the Ballerina	1960	Yes	Yes	Yes			
The Vampire of the Opera	1964	Yes	Yes	Yes			
Django Kills Softly	1967		Yes	Yes			
Delirium	1972	Yes	Yes	Yes			
Black Magic Rites	1973	Yes	Yes	Yes	Yes	Producer, film editor	
Mania	1974	Yes	Yes		Yes	Producer	
