= Mario Gariazzo =

Italian screenwriter

- Born: 4 June 1930; Biella, Italy
- Died: 18 March 2002 (aged 71); Rome, Italy
- Occupations: Screenwriter; Film director
- Years active: 1962–1992

Mario Gariazzo (4 June 1930 – 18 March 2002) was an Italian screenwriter and film director. He wrote for 21 films between 1969 and 1992. He also directed 18 films between 1962 and 1992. He was born in Biella, Italy and died in Rome, Italy at age 71. Gariazzo is known to horror film fans for directing The Eerie Midnight Horror Show in 1974, and White Slave in 1985. He also directed the 1978 Italian science fiction film Eyes Behind The Stars. He worked with Klaus Kinski, Ivan Rassimov, Richard Harrison, Ray Lovelock, Martin Balsam and other genre stars.

== Selected filmography ==
- Holy Water Joe (1971) spaghetti western starring Ty Hardin and Richard Harrison
- The Bloody Hands of the Law (1973) a.k.a. Execution Squad, a.k.a. The Law Enforcers, starring Klaus Kinski
- Last Moments (1974) starring James Whitmore and Lee J. Cobb
- The Eerie Midnight Horror Show (1974) a.k.a. The Sexorcist, starring Ivan Rassimov
- Eyes Behind the Stars (1978) a.k.a. Occhi dalle stelle, starring Martin Balsam
- Very Close Encounters of the Fourth Kind (1978)
- Play Motel (1979) starring Ray Lovelock
- White Slave (1985) a.k.a. Amazonia: The Catherine Miles Story, a.k.a. Cannibal Holocaust 2
