= Lee Kkoch-nim =

South Korean novelist (born 1989)

- 이꽃님
- Lee Kkoch-nim
- Born: 1989 (age 36–37)
- Other name: Lee Kkot-nim
- Occupations: Novelist, children's writer
- Writing career
- Years active: 2014–present
- Genres: Young adult fiction, children's literature
- Notable works: I Will Cross Time for You (2018); The Girl You Want to Kill (2021); Of Course, I . . . You (2023)
- Notable awards: Seoul Shinmun New Year Literary Contest, children's fiction (2014); Munhakdongne Youth Literature Award (2017)

Lee Kkoch-nim (Korean: 이꽃님; RR: Lee Kkochnim; born 1989) is a South Korean novelist and children's writer who writes mainly young adult fiction. She made her debut in 2014, when her story 메두사의 후예 ("Descendants of Medusa") won the children's fiction category of the Seoul Shinmun New Year Literary Contest. In 2017 she won the 8th Munhakdongne Youth Literature Award for 세계를 건너 너에게 갈게 (I Will Cross Time for You). Her novel 죽이고 싶은 아이 (The Girl You Want to Kill, 2021) and its 2024 sequel have sold a combined 500,000 copies, and the rights to the first volume have been sold in 11 countries.

== Life and career ==
Lee studied creative writing at Gwangju University. In 2014, at the age of 24, she won the children's fiction category of the Seoul Shinmun New Year Literary Contest with the story 메두사의 후예 ("Descendants of Medusa"). Her first young adult novel, 이름을 훔친 소년 ("The Boy Who Stole a Name"), was published in 2015.

In 2017 her novel 세계를 건너 너에게 갈게 (I Will Cross Time for You) received the grand prize of the 8th Munhakdongne Youth Literature Award. She went on to publish 행운이 너에게 다가오는 중 (Good Luck Is Coming to You, 2020), 죽이고 싶은 아이 (The Girl You Want to Kill, 2021), 당연하게도 나는 너를 (Of Course, I . . . You, 2023) and 여름을 한 입 베어 물었더니 (Taking a Bite out of Summer, 2023).

The Girl You Want to Kill reconstructs the death of a female high school student through the statements of several characters. A sequel was published in 2024. As of November 2026 the two volumes had sold a combined 500,000 copies, and the rights had been sold in 11 countries, including Italy and France. Her books have been translated into languages including Spanish, Italian, Turkish, Thai, Chinese, Japanese and Russian. In 2025 she was invited to Festivaletteratura in Mantua, Italy.

== Writing and themes ==
Lee's novels deal with adolescents' emotions and relationships, including family ties, friendship and identity. I Will Cross Time for You tells its story through letters exchanged between two characters living in different time periods. Good Luck Is Coming to You deals with child abuse. In an essay for Korean Literature Now, Lee wrote that she used the theme of gaslighting in Of Course, I . . . You to show that love cannot be used to control another person.

In a 2023 interview with Channel Yes, Lee said that her aim is to write about issues relevant to teenagers in a way that keeps them from putting the book down.

== Awards ==
- 2014: Seoul Shinmun New Year Literary Contest, children's fiction, for "Descendants of Medusa"
- 2017: 8th Munhakdongne Youth Literature Award, grand prize, for I Will Cross Time for You

== Works ==
=== Young adult novels ===
- 이름을 훔친 소년 ("The Boy Who Stole a Name"). Gimmyoung Junior, 2015. ISBN 9788934971610. Revised in 2026 as 잃어버린 건 없는지 잊은 건 아닌지 ("Anything Lost, Anything Forgotten"). Ekkeul, 2026. ISBN 9791198792129
- 세계를 건너 너에게 갈게 (I Will Cross Time for You). Munhakdongne, 2018. ISBN 9788954650212
- 행운이 너에게 다가오는 중 (Good Luck Is Coming to You). Munhakdongne, 2020. ISBN 9788954675314
- 죽이고 싶은 아이 (The Girl You Want to Kill). Woorischool, 2021. ISBN 9791190337755
- 당연하게도 나는 너를 (Of Course, I . . . You). Woorischool, 2023. ISBN 9791167550972
- 여름을 한 입 베어 물었더니 (Taking a Bite out of Summer). Munhakdongne, 2023. ISBN 9788954694575
- 죽이고 싶은 아이 2 (The Girl You Want to Kill 2). Woorischool, 2024. ISBN 9791167552723
- 내가 없던 어느 밤에 ("One Night When I Wasn't There"). Woorischool, 2025. ISBN 9791167553300
- 흔들리는 것들의 시선에서 ("Through the Eyes of Those Who Waver"). Ekkeul, 2026. ISBN 9791198792136

=== Children's books ===
- 악당이 사는 집 ("The House Where the Villain Lives"), illustrated by Cho Yoon-ju. Gimmyoung Junior, 2017. ISBN 9788934977445
- 귀신 고민 해결사 ("Problem Solver for Ghosts"), illustrated by Godam. Gimmyoung Junior, 2019. ISBN 9788934996743

=== Anthologies ===
- 소녀를 위한 페미니즘 ("Feminism for Girls"), with four other authors. Jaeum & Moeum, 2019. ISBN 9788954440011
- B612의 샘 ("The Well on B612"), with six other authors. Changbi Edu, 2022. ISBN 9791165701376
- 우연한 작별 ("A Chance Farewell"), with five other authors; includes Lee's story 에이저. Chaek Git, 2025. ISBN 9791165703868
