= Sady Rebbot =

French actor

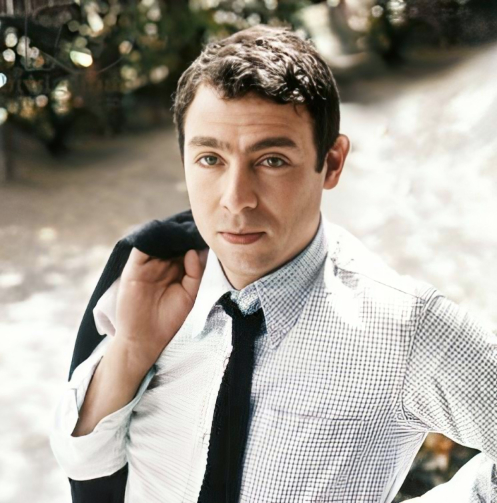
- Born: 27 April 1935; Casablanca, Morocco
- Died: 12 October 1994 (aged 59); Paris, France
- Occupation: Actor
- Years active: 1959–1994

Sady Rebbot (27 April 1935 – 12 October 1994) was a French actor. He appeared in 68 films and television shows between 1959 and 1994. He starred with Anna Karina in the 1962 film Vivre sa vie. and the following year he starred in Chi lavora è perduto, the directorial debut of Tinto Brass.

== Partial filmography ==
- Rue des prairies (1959) – Un copain de Fernand (uncredited)
- Trapped by Fear (1960) – Le photographe de mode
- Les moutons de Panurge (1961) – (uncredited)
- La fille aux yeux d'or (1962) – Un dévorant
- Vivre sa vie (1962) – Raoul
- Chi lavora è perduto (1963) – Bonifacio
- Le bluffeur (1964) – André
- Brigade antigangs (1966) – Vrillard
- Shock Troops (1967) – Hardy
- Darling Caroline (1968) – L'homme enfermé avec Caroline
- Last Leap (1970) – Le professeur
- Trop petit mon ami (1970) – L'inspecteur Lepsky
- Friends (1971) – Pierre
- Le Tueur (1972) – Lucien, le Grenoblois
- La révélation (1973) – Le couturier
- Le Drakkar (1973, TV Movie) – Michel
- Le bougnoul (1975) – Le substitut du procureur
- L'imprécateur (1977)
- Once in Paris... (1978) – 2nd Man at Party
- An Almost Perfect Affair (1979) – Customs official
- Brigade mondaine: La secte de Marrakech (1979) – Père Luc
- Les Maîtres du temps (1982) – Claude (voice)
- S.A.S. à San Salvador (1983) – Pablo
- My Nights Are More Beautiful Than Your Days (1989) – François
- La Révolution française (1989) – Le Président du Conseil Municipal (segment "Années Lumière, Les")
