= Claudia Koll =

Italian actress (born 1965)

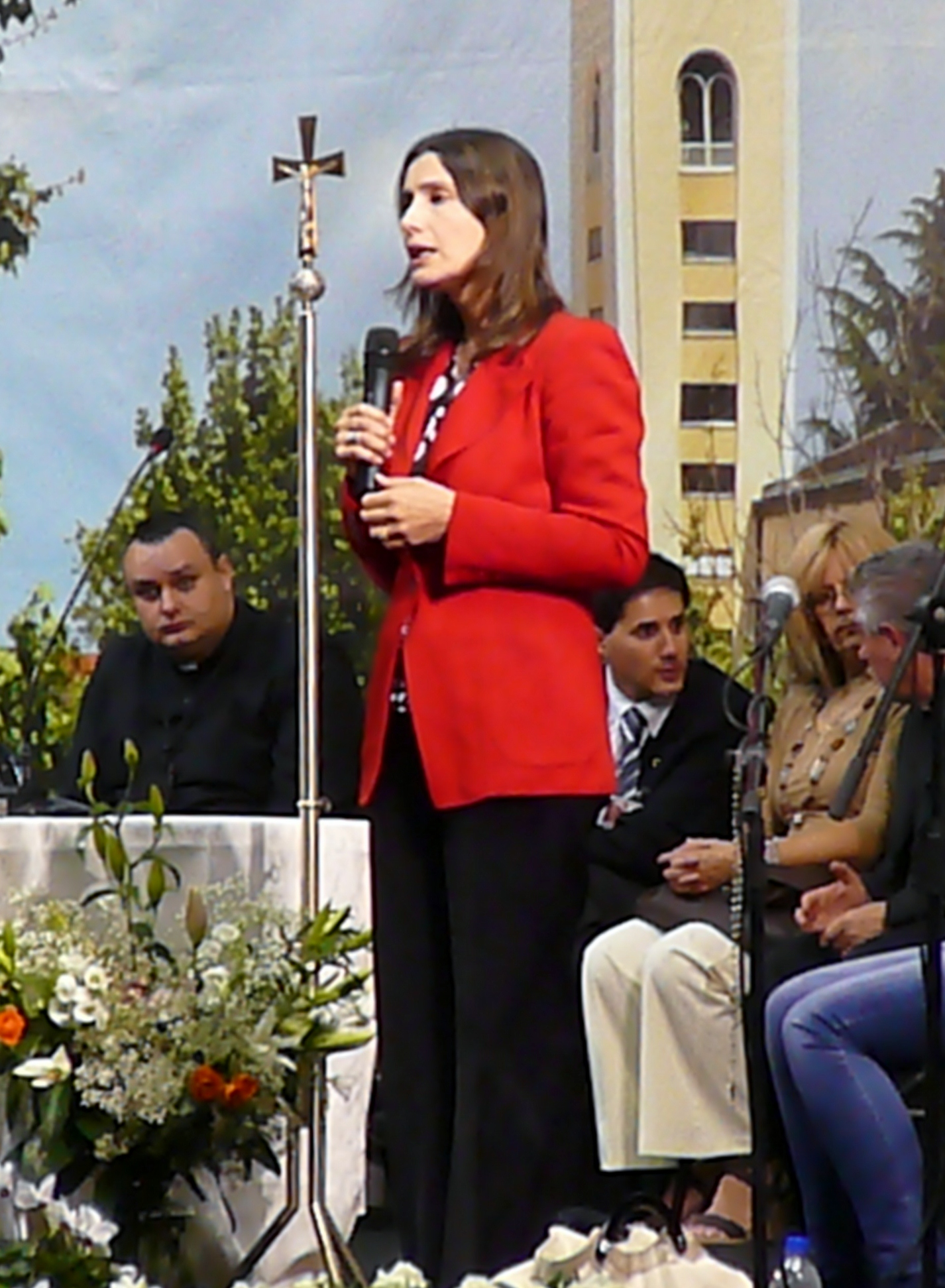
- Koll in 2011
- Born: Claudia Maria Rosaria Colacione; 17 May 1965 (age 61); Rome, Italy
- Occupation: Actress
- Years active: 1988–present

Claudia Koll (born Claudia Maria Rosaria Colacione; 17 May 1965) is an Italian actress.

== Biography ==
Claudia Koll was born in Rome of Italian and Romanian parentage.

Koll made her debut as a cinema actress in 1989, but achieved fame for her part in the erotic movie Così fan tutte (All Ladies Do It, 1992), directed by Tinto Brass. Subsequently she has worked mostly for theater and television. She reached her widest audience in the popular television series Linda e il brigadiere (Linda and the Brigadier, 1997-2000) with Nino Manfredi.

She co-hosted the 1995 edition of the Sanremo Music Festival.

She had a Catholic upbringing, but when she left home to become an actress, she also left the Church. As she said in her testimony, she began to live as she liked, doing whatever she wanted, in a spirit of rebellion against all authority. She lived this transgressive life, she said, for many years, thinking it was true liberty, but its actual effect on her was to leave her psychologically vulnerable and without protection. One day in 2000, during a session of vaguely Buddhist, vaguely "New Age"-style meditation such as what many people in show business, she said, make use of in order to relax and be able to concentrate on their work, she found herself, without warning, overcome by a terrifying sense of being in the presence of evil and in mortal danger. In her fear she began to recite the Lord's Prayer and felt the threat recede. According to the exorcist Father Francesco Bamonte, "Transcendental Meditation...and other such New Age practices that stress 'out of body' experiences" can potentially open the door to demonic attacks.

Subsequently Claudia Koll became a devout Roman Catholic. She is involved in several humanitarian activities and has travelled all over Italy to give testimony of her conversion and invite young people to return to prayer and faith in God. In 2006 she also gave a moving testimony at a healing service in Malta, where she also returned in 2016 on an invitation from the Magnificat group to speak at St Catherine’s Church in Valletta.

Koll has coeliac disease; and was an honorary president of the Italian Coeliac Association.

== Filmography ==
- Orlando sei (1989)
- Così fan tutte (1992)
- Benito - The Rise and Fall of Mussolini (1993)
- Miracolo italiano (1994)
- Uomini sull'orlo di una crisi di nervi (1995)
- Cucciolo (1998)
- Maria Goretti (2003)
