= Without Family =

- Directed by: Vittorio Gassman
- Written by: Age & Scarpelli; Vittorio Gassman
- Produced by: Mario Cecchi Gori
- Starring: Vittorio Gassman; Paolo Villaggio
- Cinematography: Mario Vulpiani
- Edited by: Franco Arcalli
- Music by: Fiorenzo Carpi
- Release date: 1972
- Country: Italy
- Language: Italian

Without Family, originally released as Senza famiglia, nullatenenti cercano affetto (literally No family, no property, looking for affection), is a 1972 Italian comedy film directed by Vittorio Gassman.

== Cast ==
- Vittorio Gassman: Armando Tavanati
- Paolo Villaggio: Agostino Antoniucci
- Enzo Robutti: Malato
- Rossana Di Lorenzo: Mrs. Antoniucci
- Isa Bellini: Old Gipsy from Campobasso
- Giancarlo Fusco: Cesare
- Corrado Gaipa: Judge
- Augusto Mastrantoni: Giuseppe
- Toni Ucci: Nurse
- Carlo Delle Piane: Nurse
- Liù Bosisio: Orphanage Director
