= Ça ira – Il fiume della rivolta =

1964 film by Tinto Brass

- Directed by: Tinto Brass
- Written by: Tinto Brass; Gian Carlo Fusco; Franco Arcalli
- Produced by: Zebra Film
- Cinematography: Bruno Barcarol
- Music by: Romolo Grano
- Release date: 3 December 1964
- Running time: 85 mins
- Country: Italy
- Language: Italian

Ça ira – Il fiume della rivolta ("Ça ira – The River of Revolt"), also released internationally as Thermidor, is an Italian collage film combining documentary and drama genres, directed by Tinto Brass. Taking its name from the popular revolutionary song "Ça ira", the film is a critical narrative of 20th century revolutions from 1900 to 1962 and their legacy.

The first film directed by Brass, it was produced in 1962 but only premiered at the Venice Film Festival in September 1964. It was then released theatrically in December.

== Synopsis ==
Brass strings together a series of stark and direct sequences depicting the October Revolution, the Mexican Revolution, the Great War, the Japanese invasion of China, the Spanish Civil War, World War II, Nazism, Fascism, the extermination camps, and the atomic bombings of Hiroshima and Nagasaki.

The film also includes Paul Éluard reading one of his poems, and features two songs performed by Édith Piaf and Edmonda Aldini. Additionally, it introduces the theme of sex as an ideological disruptor.

== Narration/voice ==
- Enrico Maria Salerno
- Sandra Milo
- Tino Buazzelli
