= Nightmare Castle =

- Italian theatrical release poster
- Directed by: Mario Caiano
- Screenplay by: Mario Caiano; Fabio De Agostini
- Story by: Mario Caiano; Fabio De Agostini
- Produced by: Carlo Caiano
- Starring: Barbara Steele; Paul Muller; Helga Liné; Marino Masé; Rik Battaglia; Giuseppe Addobbati
- Cinematography: Enzo Barboni
- Edited by: Renato Cinquini
- Music by: Ennio Morricone
- Production company: Cinematografica Emmeci
- Distributed by: Emmeci
- Release date: 16 July 1965 (Italy)
- Running time: 97 minutes
- Country: Italy
- Box office: ₤154 million

Nightmare Castle, also known as The Faceless Monster, (Italian: Amanti d’Oltretomba) is a 1965 Italian horror film directed by Mario Caiano. The film stars Paul Muller, Helga Liné and Barbara Steele in a dual role.

Mario Caiano shot the film in Rome and declared it his tribute to the Gothic genre and to actress Barbara Steele. Among reviews of the film, critics and historians note Steele's dual performance.

== Plot ==
Stephen Arrowsmith, a scientist, has his home laboratory in the castle owned by his wife Muriel. Stephen finds her having sex with a gardener, David. He attacks and disfigures David with a hot poker and burns Muriel's body with acid. Before electrocuting both of them, Stephen is told that he is not Muriel's heir, but that the estate has been willed to her stepsister, Jenny, who is mentally unstable. Stephen removes David's and Muriel's hearts and hides them in an urn. He uses their blood to rejuvenate his aged servant, Solange.

Sometime later, Stephen marries Jenny, planning to have the rejuvenated Solange drive her insane. Jenny begins having nightmares, which include the sound of beating hearts and Muriel's voice urging her to murder Stephen. Stephen brings Dr. Derek Joyce to the castle to treat Jenny, who becomes convinced that supernatural forces are at work. Joyce discovers the hidden hearts of Muriel and David. The murdered dead return as ghosts. Muriel burns Stephen alive while David reduces Solange to a skeleton by draining her blood. Dr. Joyce then burns the disembodied hearts and leaves the castle with Jenny.

== Cast ==
- Barbara Steele – Muriel / Jenny
- Paul Muller – Stephen Arrowsmith
- Helga Liné – Solange
- Marino Masé – Dr. Derek Joyce
- Rik Battaglia - David
- Giuseppe Addobbati - Jonathan (as John McDouglas)

== Production ==
Director Mario Caiano stated that Nightmare Castle was born out of his passion for actress Barbara Steele and the Gothic genre, a style which he began to love between 1943 and '44 when he first read Edgar Allan Poe's work. Caiano said that he was not influenced by director Mario Bava, and did not remember seeing his films at the time with the possible exception of Black Sunday (1960). The initial script treatment for the film was titled Orgasmo and re-uses ideas from Poe's "The Tell-Tale Heart".

Caiano's father Carlo was the producer of the film and was given a low budget to work with. With his friend art director Bruno Cesari, Caiano found a villa to use as a shooting location. The film was shot at Villa Parisi in Frascati and at Incir-De-Paolis Studios in Rome over 18 days. The film was released in black-and-white, shot by director of photography Enzo Barboni, but it was originally planned for some scenes to be given a red tint in post production.

== Release ==
Nightmare Castle was released in Italy on 16 July 1965 where it was distributed by Emmeci. The film grossed a total of 154 million Italian lire on its theatrical release. The film was released by Allied Artists Pictures in the United States on 5 July 1966, shortly before the studio's initial demise.

Nightmare Castle has been released on DVD by several companies, including Severin Films, Alpha Video and Retromedia in the United States. A Blu-ray of the film was released by Severin Films on 11 August 2015. The release includes two extra films starring Steele: Castle of Blood and Terror-Creatures from the Grave

== Reception ==
In a contemporary review, the Monthly Film Bulletin stated that "this period horror gets bogged down in mundane melodrama" and that the direction was "pedestrian". The review did praise Barbara Steele, stating she was "on good form as Muriel [...] and just as good as the blonde, doe-eyed, raving Jenny."

From later reviews, TV Guide awarded the film a score of two out of four rating, stating that, while the film was not as strong as Bava's Black Sunday, it was still a "worthwhile effort" and that "its greatest success in showing the beautiful horror icon [Steele] in as many extreme situations and personas as possible." In his book A History of Italian Cinema, Peter Bondanella stated that "Caiano's cinematography cannot match that of either [Riccardo] Freda or [Mario] Bava, he may well have captured Barbara Steele in even more compelling shots in Nightmare Castle than either of them did in their own, much better films." Louis Paul, author of Italian Horror Film Directors noted that Caiano was "obviously infatuated" with Barbara Steele, while opining that Caiano's films in fantasy, sword-and-sandal peplums and Eurospy genres "worked much better" than his Gothic horror efforts. Author and film critic Leonard Maltin gave the film two out of a possible four stars. In his review on the film, Maltin commended the film's atmosphere and Steele's performance, but criticized the film's plot as overly familiar. IGN felt the plot dated, noting that it included "false starts, drawn-out dialogue and a rushed ending" They did praise the acting and direction, noting " the performances and absolutely phenomenal direction and atmosphere are unparalleled. This is the definition of a lost classic in those regards."

== See also ==
- List of films in the public domain in the United States
- List of horror films of 1965
- List of Italian films of 1965

== Notes ==
=== References ===
- Bondanella, Peter (2009). A History of Italian Cinema. A&C Black. ISBN 978-1441160690.
- Curti, Roberto (2015). Italian Gothic Horror Films, 1957-1969. McFarland. ISBN 978-1476619897.
- Hughes, Howard (2011). Cinema Italiano - The Complete Guide From Classics To Cult. London - New York: I.B.Tauris. ISBN 978-1-84885-608-0.
- Paul, Louis (2004). Italian Horror Film Directors. McFarland. ISBN 0786461136.
- Martin, Len D. (1993). The Allied Artists Checklist: The Feature Films and Short Subjects of Allied Artists Pictures Corporation, 1947-1978. McFarland. ISBN 978-0786411139.
