= List of horror films of 1965 =

A list of horror films released in 1965.

Horror films released in 1965
Title	Director	Cast	Country	Notes
A Study in Terror	James Hill	John Neville, Donald Houston	United Kingdom	
The Beach Girls and the Monster	Jon Hall	Jon Hall, Sue Casey, Walter Edmiston	United States	
The Beast That Killed Women	Barry Mahon	Janet Banzet	United States	filmed at a nudist colony
Bloody Pit of Horror	Massimo Pupillo	Mickey Hargitay, Walter Brandi, Luisa Baratto	Italy; United States	
The Collector	William Wyler	Terence Stamp, Samantha Eggar	United Kingdom	
Color Me Blood Red	Herschell Gordon Lewis	Gordon Oas-Heim, Candi Conder, Elyn Warner	United States	
Curse of Simba (aka Curse of the Voodoo)	Lindsay Shonteff	Bryant Halliday, Dennis Price, Lisa Daniely	United States; United Kingdom	aka Curse of the Voodoo
Curse of the Fly	Don Sharp	Brian Donlevy, Carole Gray, George Baker	United Kingdom	
Dark Intruder	Harvey Hart	Leslie Nielsen, Gilbert Green, Charles Bolender	United States	
A Devilish Homicide	Lee Yong-min	Lee Ye-chun, Do Kum-bong	South Korea	
Devils of Darkness	Lance Comfort	William Sylvester, Hubert Noël, Carole Gray	United Kingdom	
Die, Monster, Die!	Daniel Haller	Boris Karloff, Nick Adams, Freda Jackson	United States; United Kingdom	
Dr. Terror's House of Horrors	Freddie Francis	Peter Cushing, Christopher Lee, Roy Castle	United Kingdom; United States	
The Embalmer	Dino Tavella	Luigi Martocci	Italy	
The Face of Fu Manchu	Don Sharp	Christopher Lee, Nigel Green, Howard Marion-Crawford	United Kingdom	
Fanatic (a.k.a. Die! Die! My Darling!)	Silvio Narizzano	Tallulah Bankhead, Stefanie Powers, Peter Vaughan	United Kingdom	
Frankenstein Conquers the World	Ishirō Honda	Nick Adams, Tadao Takashima, Kumi Mizuno	Japan	
Illusion of Blood	Shirō Toyoda	Tatsuya Nakadai, Mariko Okada, Junko Ikeuchi	Japan	
Incubus	Leslie Stevens	William Shatner, Allyson Ames	United States	
I Saw What You Did	William Castle	Joan Crawford, John Ireland, Leif Erickson	United States	
Kaidan Katame no Otoko	Tsuneo Kobayashi	Kō Nishimura, Sanae Nakahara, Kikuko Hojo	Japan	
House of Terrors (Kaidan Semushi Otoko)	Hajime Sato	Kō Nishimura, Yuko Kusunoki, Yoko Hayama	Japan	
Lady Morgan's Vengeance	Massimo Pupillo	Gordon Mitchell, Erika Blanc	Italy	
Monster a Go-Go	Herschell Gordon Lewis, Bill Rebane, Sheldon Seymour	Henry Hite, Phil Morton, June Travis	United States	
Monsters Crash the Pajama Party	David L. Hewitt	Don Brandon	United States	
The Nanny	Seth Holt	Bette Davis	United Kingdom	
Nightmare Castle	Mario Caiano	Barbara Steele, Paul Muller, Helga Liné	Italy	
Orgy of the Dead	Stephen C. Apostolof	William Bonner, Fawn Silver, Colleen O'Brien	United States	
Planet of the Vampires	Mario Bava	Norma Bengell, Evi Marandi, Ángel Aranda	Italy; Spain	
Psycho A-Go-Go	Al Adamson	Roy Morton	United States	
Repulsion	Roman Polanski	Catherine Deneuve, Yvonne Furneaux, Ian Hendry	United Kingdom	
The Seventh Grave	Garibaldi Serra Caracciolo	Stefania Menchinelli, Nando Angelini, Armando Guarnier	Italy	
The She Wolf	Rafael Baledón	Kitty de Hoyos, Joaquín Cordero, José Elías Moreno	Mexico	
The Skull	Freddie Francis	Peter Cushing, Christopher Lee, Jill Bennett	United Kingdom; United States	
Terror-Creatures from the Grave	Massimo Pupillo	Barbara Steele, Walter Bigari, Mirella Maravidi	Italy; United States	
Two on a Guillotine	William Conrad	Dean Jones, Cesar Romero, Parley Baer	United States	
Un Vampiro para Dos	Pedro Lazaga	Gracita Morales, José Luis López Vázquez, Fernando Fernán Gómez	Spain	

== Citations ==
- Curti, Roberto (2015). Italian Gothic Horror Films, 1957–1969. McFarland. ISBN 978-1-4766-1989-7.
- Derry, Charles (2009). Dark dreams 2.0: A Psychological History of the Modern Horror Film From the 1950s to the 21st Century. McFarland. ISBN 978-0-7864-3397-1.
- Galbraith IV, Stuart (2008). The Toho Studios Story: A History and Complete Filmography. Scarecrow Press. ISBN 978-1461673743.
- Hardy, Phil, ed. (1995). The Overlook Film Encyclopedia. Vol. 3. Overlook Press. ISBN 978-0-87951-624-6.
- Krafsur, Richard P., ed. (1997). The American Film Institute Catalog of Motion Pictures Produced in the United States: Feature Films, 1961–1970, Part 2. University of California Press. ISBN 978-0-520-20970-1.
- Picart, C. (2001). The Frankenstein film sourcebook. Greenwood Publishing Group. ISBN 978-0-313-31350-9.
