= Yankee (film) =

1966 film

- Film poster
- Directed by: Tinto Brass
- Written by: Alfonso Balcázar; Tinto Brass; Gian Carlo Fusco; Alberto Silvestri
- Produced by: Francesco Giorgi; Antonio Lucatelli
- Starring: Philippe Leroy
- Cinematography: Alfio Contini
- Edited by: Teresa Alcocer
- Music by: Nini Rosso; Puccio Roelens
- Release date: 25 August 1966
- Running time: 92 minutes
- Country: Italy
- Language: Italian

Yankee is a 1966 Italian-Spanish Western film directed by Tinto Brass and starring Philippe Leroy.

== Plot ==
Local crime boss El Grande Concho rules with his gang from an abandoned church over a big territory. Hoping for a substantial payday, a bounty hunter called "Yankee" decides to take him on.

== Cast ==
- Philippe Leroy - Yankee
- Adolfo Celi - Grande Concho
- Mirella Martin - Rosita
- Tomás Torres - Luiz
- Francisco Sanz - Consalvo (as Paco Sanz)
- Franco De Rosa - Angelface
- Víctor Israel - the sheriff
- Pasquale Basile - Denti d'oro
- Jacques Herlin - Filosofo
- Giorgio Bret Schneider - Pittore
- Antonio Basile - Tatuato
- Renzo Pevarello - the Portuguese
- César Ojinaga - the deputy sheriff (as Caesar Ojinaga)
- Valentino Macchi - Garcia
- Tomas Milton - Tom
- Henriquetta Senalada (as Enriquetta Señalada)
- Jose Halufi - Perro (as José Jalufi)
