= Too Small Ticky =

- Directed by: Eddy Matalon
- Screenplay by: Jean-Claude Grumberg; Sady Rebbot
- Based on: The Way the Cookie Crumbles by James Hadley Chase
- Starring: Jane Birkin; Michael Dunn; Bernard Fresson
- Cinematography: Jean-Jacques Tarbès
- Edited by: Jacques Doillon
- Music by: William Sheller
- Release date: September 15, 1970 (France)
- Running time: 80 minutes
- Country: France

Too Small Ticky (French: Trop petit mon ami lit. 'Too Small My Friend') is a 1970 French crime film directed by Eddy Matalon. It is based on the novel The Way the Cookie Crumbles by James Hadley Chase. The film stars Jane Birkin, Michael Dunn and Bernard Fresson.

The film is about Ticky Edriss, a man with dwarfism who has Philippe murder a man and make it look like a crime of passion committed by his lover Muriel, who supposedly kills herself after. The woman's body is found in the casino where Ticky works. As they were neighbours, Ticky was quick to report information to the police. Posing as a lawyer, Philppie goes to a high school to pick up and kill Patricia, the 18-year-old daughter of Muriel. Ticky plans to replace her with Muriel's own sister, Christine, to steal from a bank.

== Cast ==
- Jane Birkin as Christine Mars
- Michael Dunn as Ticky Edriss
- Bernard Fresson as Philippe Algir
- Claude Brasseur as Inspector Hess
- André Pousse as Inspector Terrel
- Sady Rebbot as Inspector Lepsky
- Roger Blin as Boris

== Production ==
Too Small Ticky was an adaptation of the novel The Way the Cookie Crumbles by English writer James Hadley Chase. The novel was adapted into French in 1965 under the title Trop petit mon ami as number 940 in the Série noire collection. The film was adapted into Eddy Matalon's film Too Small Ticky and was among over 15 film adaptations of Price's novels in France.

In 1968, producer Bob Zagury's production company Les Films du Quadrangle optioned Chase's novel and joined with Les Films Coronoa to shoot the film in the first half of 1969.

== Released ==
Too Small Ticky was released in France on September 15, 1970 as Trop petit mon ami. The film had 44,277 admissions in France. Roberto Curti and Frank Lafond, the authors of French Thrillers of the 1970s: Volume I, Crime Films (2026), described the film as a commercial failure in France.

The film was distributed in England in early 1975 as Too Small Ticky by Pan-European Films. It was edited down to 87 minutes on release. It was also shown in Canada on a double feature with Matalon's later film Cathy's Curse (1977).

== Reception and legacy ==
Gene Moskowitz, the longtime Paris correspondent and film critic for Variety, wrote that Too Small Ticky was "too loopholed, limp and listless to make much of the tale for a so-so entry," and the talents of Dunn were wasted while Birkin and Bernard Fresson were miscast. A reviewer in The Monthly Film Bulletin said that "Birkin has to supply what motivation she can within a montage of soulful looks and other stray moments."

From retrospective reviews, François Guérif said that Matalon is so fascinated by the character with dwarfism that he neglects all else in the film, and other themes in the film lack subtlety and precision.

Guérif said that Too Small Ticky revealed Eddy Matalon's taste for the strange, which would later lead him to direct horror and fantastique films. Only two further Chase adaptations were made in the 1970s, with the comedy film Pas folle la guêpe (1972) and La Chair de l'orchidée (1975).

== See also ==
- List of French films of 1970
