= Festivaletteratura =

Literary festival held in Mantua, Italy

Festivaletteratura is annual literary festival in Mantua, Italy established in 1997. It features five days of short lectures by authors from all over the world. The event is run mostly by volunteers. The lectures are hosted in historical places and squares, offering up to two hundred events that have included leading authors and Nobel Prize winners. In 2007, the festival celebrated its tenth edition.

The 2005 fair was the backdrop for the Tinto Brass movie Monamour. In 2011 the Lovers of Valdaro were publicly shown for the first time.

== See also ==
- Mantua
- Monamour
- Virgilio
