= Franco De Rosa =

Italian actor (born 1944)

- Born: 16 July 1944 (age 81); Viareggio, Italy
- Occupation: Actor
- Years active: 1964–82

Franco De Rosa (born 16 July 1944, Viareggio) is an Italian actor who was active in Italian and British cinema and television from the 1960s to the 1980s.

== Filmography ==
- Drop Dead Darling (1966)
- Ringo and His Golden Pistol (1966)
- Yankee (1966)
- The Young, the Evil and the Savage (1968)
- Journey to the Far Side of the Sun (1969)
- Sartana in the Valley of Death (1970)
- Holiday on the Buses (1973)
- Big Pot (1976)
