= The Seventh Grave =

- Directed by: Garibaldi Serra Caracciolo
- Screenplay by: Alessandro Santini; Antonio Casale; Garibaldi Serra Caracciolo
- Produced by: Felice Falvo; Arturo Giorni; Alessandro Santini
- Starring: Stefania Menchinelli; Nando Angelini; Armando Guarnieri; Bruna Baini
- Cinematography: Aldo Greci
- Edited by: Mariano Arditi
- Music by: Leopoldo Perez Bonsignore
- Release date: 18 August 1965 (Italy)
- Running time: 77 minutes
- Country: Italy
- Budget: ₤40 million

The Seventh Grave (Italian: La settima tomba) is a 1965 Italian horror film directed by Garibaldi Serra Caracciolo.

== Cast ==
- Stefania Menchinelli as Katy
- Nando Angelini as Elliot
- Armando Guarnieri as Inspector Martin Wright/Sir Reginald Thorne
- Bruna Baini as Mary Jenkins' lover
- Antonio Casale as Jenkins
- Germana Dominici as Betty
- Ferruccio Viotti as Pastor Crabbe
- Gianni Dei as Fred, Jenkins' brother
- Calogero Reale as Patrick

== Production ==
The Seventh Grave was produced by F.G.S. International Pictures, a company founded in December 1964 by Felice Falvo, Arturo Giorni and Alessandro Santini.

Santini also wrote the story and screenplay with director Garibaldia Serra Caracciolo and actor Antonio Casale. The film was shot in three and a half weeks at Balsorano castle and Olimpia Studios in Rome from February to March 1965. The films budget was around 40 million Italian lire.

== Release ==
A photonovel of the film was published in issue 52 of the Malìa in May 1965 while the film was released on 18 August 1965. In 1968, Fortuanato Misiano's company Romana Cinematografica bought the rights from the producers and attempted to get the subsidies from 1965's Corona law. The film was rejected by the Ministerial commission who unanimously decided that the "technical eligibility and sufficient artistic, culture and spectacular qualities" that the law demanded were not present.

== Reception ==
Roberto Curti, author of Italian Gothic Horror Films, 1957-1969 noted the films amateur qualities such as breaking the 180 degree rule and lacking continuity between shots and that "lighting was passable at best". The script was described as one that "haphazardly assembles a bunch of Gothic stereotypes" and that the plot, the production clearly saw The Cat and the Canary (1927) "one too many times".

== See also ==
- List of horror films of 1965
- List of Italian films of 1965
