= Franco Arcalli =

Italian screenwriter, actor and film editor (1929-1978)

- Born: 13 March 1929; Rome, Kingdom of Italy
- Died: 24 February 1978 (aged 48); Lazio, Italy
- Occupations: Film editor; screenwriter
- Years active: 1954–1978

Franco "Kim" Arcalli (13 March 1929 – 24 February 1978) was an Italian film editor and screenwriter best known for his work with Bernardo Bertolucci, Tinto Brass and Michelangelo Antonioni.

== Life and career ==
Born in Rome by a Venetian family, his last name was Orcalli, but he was wrongly recorded as Arcalli by the officer of the Registry, and the error was never corrected. At fifteen, after the death of his father killed by the fascists, Arcalli moved to Venice where he collaborated with the partisans.

Arcalli stepped into the world of cinema in 1954 as an actor, playing a small role in Luchino Visconti's Senso. After starring in two more films, he started his career of screenwriter and editor thanks to his real life friend Tinto Brass, with whom he collaborated on a film installation, Ça ira - Il fiume della rivolta, which was screened at the Venice Film Festival in September 1964, and later on Chi lavora è perduto, where in addition to working on the script Arcalli starred in a role of weight as an ex-partisan named Kim.

Arcalli later moved to Rome, where in a few years he imposed himself as a "creative" editor, and even working in the employ of the film company Euro International Film he got the power of choice for the films to work on. In these years he started some critically acclaimed collaborations with directors Giulio Questi, Salvatore Samperi, Giuseppe Patroni Griffi and specially Bernardo Bertolucci (The Conformist, Last Tango in Paris, 1900) and Michelangelo Antonioni (Zabriskie Point, The Passenger).

Arcalli died of cancer in 1978, at 48, while he was engaged in the writing process of Sergio Leone's Once Upon a Time in America and Bernardo Bertolucci's La Luna.
