= Nando Angelini =

Italian actor (1933–2025)

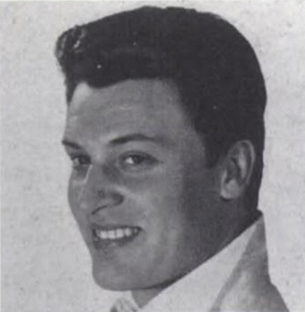
- Born: 17 August 1933; San Benedetto del Tronto, Italy
- Died: 3 August 2025 (aged 91); San Benedetto del Tronto, Italy
- Occupation: Actor
- Years active: 1955–1968

Nando Angelini (17 August 1933 – 3 August 2025) was an Italian actor. He appeared in more than eighty films from 1957 onwards.

== Life and career ==
Born in San Benedetto del Tronto, Angelini enrolled at the Centro Sperimentale di Cinematografia, graduating in 1955. Very active as a character actor, he was sometimes credited as Nick Angel and Fernand Angels. Besides his acting career, he worked for RAI as a documentarist and a television writer of educational programs.

As of March 2024, Angelini lived in Porto d'Ascoli. He died on 3 August 2025, at the age of 91.

== Filmography ==
Year	Title	Role	Notes
1957	Amarti è il mio destino	Allyson	
1958	Il bacio del sole (Don Vesuvio)		
1958	Il segreto delle rose	Frate Paolo	
1959	The Moralist		
1959	General Della Rovere	Paolo	
1959	Due selvaggi a corte		
1959	Guardatele ma non toccatele	Aviere meccanico	
1959	Tipi da spiaggia		
1960	Messalina	Glauco, Armenian Veteran	
1960	Gentlemen Are Born		
1960	Il peccato degli anni verdi		
1960	Toto, Fabrizi and the Young People Today	Commesso	
1960	Adua and Her Friends		
1960	The Two Rivals		
1960	Pirates of the Coast	Manolito	
1960	The Giants of Thessaly	Compagno di Giasone	
1960	The Pharaohs' Woman		
1960	Who Hesitates Is Lost	Lo sposino	
1960	Un dollaro di fifa	Spiritual	
1961	Garibaldi	Captain Pietro G.B. Spangaro	
1961	The Last of the Vikings	Simon - uomo di Sveno	
1961	Guns of the Black Witch		
1961	Gli scontenti		
1961	Sua Eccellenza si fermò a mangiare	Il Brigadiere dei Carabinieri	
1961	The Lovemakers	Young man	
1961	The Fascist		
1961	The Last Judgment		
1961	Duel of Champions	Official	
1961	Duel of the Titans		
1961	Caccia all'uomo		
1961	Barabbas		
1961	Maurizio, Peppino e le indossatrici	Spartaco	
1961	I magnifici tre		
1962	Ulysses Against the Son of Hercules	Messenger	
1962	Boccaccio '70	Man Winning a Bottle	(segment "La riffa"), Uncredited
1962	Careless		
1962	Julius Caesar Against The Pirates	Roman Officer #1	
1962	Fire Monsters Against the Son of Hercules	Man of the Cave People	
1962	Lasciapassare per il morto	Ufficiale doganale	
1962	Kerim, Son of the Sheik	Akim	
1962	Invasion 1700		
1962	Il capitano di ferro		
1962	Il Sorpasso	Amedeo	
1962	La marcia su Roma		
1962	A Queen for Caesar	Sextus Pompeius	
1962	Gli eroi del doppio gioco	Engineering student	
1963	Sexy Toto		
1963	The Girl from Parma		
1963	I soliti rapinatori a Milano		
1963	To Bed or Not to Bed		
1963	Rocambole	Policeman with eyeglass	
1963	Il terrore dei mantelli rossi		
1963	Chi lavora è perduto	Il sergente	
1963	Goliath and the Rebel Slave	Soldier	Uncredited
1963	Hercules and the Masked Rider	Lt. Serrano	
1963	Outlaws of Love		
1963	The Teacher from Vigevano		
1963	Hercules, Samson and Ulysses	Rower	
1963	Scanzonatissimo		
1964	Shivers in Summer	Altro polizia	
1964	I patriarchi	Lot	
1964	I promessi sposi		
1964	Desideri d'estate		
1964	Gladiators Seven	Spying gladiator	
1964	Hero of Rome	Etruscan Soldier	
1964	Il Gaucho	Aldo	Uncredited
1964	Cyrano and d'Artagnan	Baron de Colignac	
1964	Oh! Those Most Secret Agents!	American Agent	
1964	I pirati della Malesia		
1964	Ape Man of the Jungle		
1964	Appuntamento a Dallas		
1965	The Three Faces		(segment "Latin Lover")
1965	Six Days a Week	Bruno	
1965	Maciste, the Avenger of the Mayans		
1965	Gli amanti latini		(segment "Amore e morte")
1965	The Seventh Grave	Elliot	
1965	008: Operation Exterminate	American Lieutenant at the Bowling Hall	
1965	Our Man in Jamaica	Pablo, Bar Thug	
1965	Colorado Charlie	George	
1965	Bloody Pit of Horror	Perry	
1965	Agente X 1–7 operazione Oceano		
1965	Super Seven Calling Cairo	Tecnico della Radioattività	
1965	Menage all'italiana	Tenente dei Carabinieri	
1965	Giant of the Evil Island	Ramon	
1966	Mutiny at Fort Sharpe		
1966	For One Thousand Dollars Per Day		
1966	War of the Planets	Collins	
1966	Ypotron - Final Countdown	Tecnico del video	
1966	Star Pilot	Ingegner Morelli	
1966	Operation White Shark		
1966	Sheriff with the Gold	Pasajero	
1967	O.K. Connery	Ward Jones	
1967	The Subversives		
1967	Gli altri, gli altri... e noi		
1968	The Young, the Evil and the Savage	Blond Policeman	Uncredited, (final film role)
