= All Ladies Do It =

1992 film by Tinto Brass

- Theatrical release poster
- Directed by: Tinto Brass
- Written by: Tinto Brass; Bernardino Zapponi; Francesco Costa
- Starring: Claudia Koll; Paolo Lanza; Franco Branciaroli; Ornella Marcucci; Isabella Deiana; Renzo Rinaldi; Jean-René Lemoine
- Cinematography: Silvano Ippoliti; Massimo Di Venanzo
- Edited by: Tinto Brass
- Music by: Pino Donaggio
- Production companies: Faso Film; San Francisco Film
- Distributed by: Artisti Associati
- Release date: 1992
- Running time: 93 minutes
- Country: Italy
- Language: Italian
- Budget: 100,000$
- Box office: 20,000$

All Ladies Do It (Italian: Così fan tutte [koˈzi ffan ˈtutte, koˈsi -]) is a 1992 Italian sex comedy film directed by Tinto Brass and starring Claudia Koll. It is loosely based on Mozart/da Ponte opera Così fan tutte.

== Synopsis ==
Diana is a Roman wife happily married to sympathetic Paolo, but she is keen on playing benign games of seduction with other men while resisting the advances of chic lingerie shop owner Silvio. She narrates her adventures to Paolo in order to stimulate their otherwise monotonous sexual life. However, under the influence of her lesbian friend Antonietta and raunchy sister Nadia, Diana starts to move the ongoings further while Paolo is still prone to believing that events narrated by her are merely fantasies. Nevertheless, when the French Sadean antiques dealer Donatien Alphonse leaves marks on her body, Paolo understands that Diana is cheating on him and throws her out of the house. Diana then seeks further sexual adventures, while she and Paolo reflect on the nature of sexuality, monogamy, and their future as a couple.

== Cast ==
- Claudia Koll as Diana
- Paolo Lanza as Paolo
- Renzo Rinaldi as Silvio
- Isabella Deiana as Antonietta
- Ornella Marcucci as Nadia
- Franco Branciaroli as Donatien Alphonse

== Reception ==
In a retrospective review, Sight & Sound reviewed both The Key (1983) and All Ladies Do It, noting that the latter "shows a marked decline in narrative sophistication and wit" noting that the Venice setting in this film is set more in studio-based constructs than The Key. Brass' film relocates the story to Mussolini's time and changes the setting to Venice.

== Indian adaptation ==
In November 2020, the Indian adaptation starring Sejal Shah released on Nuefliks OTT platform. The film was directed by Akhil Gautam.
