= Walter Brandi =

Italian actor (1928–1996)

- Born: Walter Bigari; 24 January 1928; Pergola, Marche, Italy.
- Died: 28 May 1996 (aged 68); Rome, Lazio, Italy.
- Other name: Walter Brandt

Walter Bigari (born 24 January 1928 – 28 May 1996) better known by his stage name Walter Brandi was an Italian actor. In his book on European exploitation films, Danny Shipka described Brandi as "one of the first de facto stars of Italian horror/exploitation", while noting he was never as popular as Christopher Lee, Barbara Steele or Peter Cushing. He predominantly acted in genre films in the 1960s. Brandi died on 28 May 1996.

== Filmography ==
Title	Year	Credited as				Role	Notes	Refs.
Title	Year	Actor	Screenwriter	Story author	Producer	Role	Notes	Refs.
The Vampire and the Ballerina	1960	Yes				Herman		
The Playgirls and the Vampire	1960	Yes				Count Gabor Kernassy, The Vampire		
Slaughter of the Vampires	1962	Yes				Marquis Wolfgang		
Three Swords for Rome	1964	Yes						
Terror-Creatures from the Grave	1965	Yes				Albert Kovacs		
Bloody Pit of Horror	1965	Yes				Rick		
Kommissar X – Drei goldene Schlangen	1969	Yes				Mr Landru		
Wanted Sabata	1970				Yes			
The Devil's Wedding Night	1973		Yes	Yes			Also production manager	
