= Monamour =

- DVD cover
- Directed by: Tinto Brass
- Written by: Tinto Brass; Carla Cipriani; Massimiliano Zanin
- Starring: Anna Jimskaia; Nela Lucic; Max Parodi
- Cinematography: Andrea Doria
- Edited by: Tinto Brass
- Music by: Heron Borelli
- Release date: 1 January 2005
- Running time: 104 minutes
- Country: Italy
- Language: Italian

Monamour is a 2005 Italian erotic romance film directed by Tinto Brass and starring Anna Jimskaia.

== Plot ==
Marta is a young housewife, married to a man named Dario, who works for a successful book publisher and is wealthy. Despite loving her husband, Marta finds their sex life dull, having resorted to frequent masturbation and reading erotic novels to satisfy herself. Marta often writes in a journal to express her feelings. While Marta and Dario are staying away from their home in a hotel in Mantua during the Festivaletteratura, Marta visits Palazzo Te. There, Marta is followed by a stranger. The stranger takes pictures of her and forcibly kisses and gropes her before she is able to break away and flee. Later that night, while Dario is dressing for a party, Marta informs him of the assault, which he dismisses as a fantasy born of her dissatisfaction. Marta insults Dario and tells him she enjoyed the encounter.

At the party, Marta encounters the stranger again. The two move to a remote location where Marta begins giving the stranger a blowjob, only to be interrupted when Marta's friend Sylvia and two others find them. Marta and Sylvia walk to the bathroom together, leaving the stranger and Sylvia's friends behind. In the bathroom, Marta describes her sexual problems to Sylvia, who suggests that she cheats on Dario. Sylvia reveals one of the two others she came to the party with is her secret lover, and claims her husband has improved sexually since she had an affair with him. Returning to their hotel room, Marta describes her encounter with the stranger in detail to Dario, and they have very quick and mediocre sex together, with Marta still unable to achieve orgasm.

In the morning, Marta finds two notes, one from Dario, and another from the stranger, calling himself Leon. She destroys both and leaves to meet with Leon. After arriving at the restaurant, Marta drinks several glasses of wine and waits for over an hour before Leon arrives. The two leave for the bathroom without eating. They have anal sex, which Marta has not done before, but greatly enjoys.

Dario enters the hotel room, searching for documents he had forgotten, and finds Marta's journal which she had hidden in a drawer. He reads it, learning of her dissatisfaction with their marriage and sex life, as well as the full details of her encounters with Leon. Dario places the journal back where he found it before leaving the hotel. Later, Marta returns to the hotel and writes in her journal. Dario walks in on her writing, at which point he confronts her about his suspicions of her cheating, yelling at her, hitting her, and calling her a slut. Marta leaves to take a bath, while Dario drinks and trashes the room.

Marta wakes up alone, and finds a letter from Dario in which he apologizes for his actions and asks her to come to the closing party of the Festival with him. She calls a phone number that Leon gave her and begs him to meet with her again. He obliges and directs her to another hotel. Marta arrives to the hotel and enters Leon's room, where he lies smoking in his bed. They have sex, after which Leon invites in one of his friends, photographs him having sex with Marta in various positions, and eventually joins them for a threesome. Later, Marta expresses worry at the thought of leaving Mantua with Dario again, and Leon gifts Marta a drawing he made of her nude, hoping to ease her anxiety.

At another party, Marta dances in front of Leon while a band plays, letting her breasts fall out of her dress and flashing several onlookers. After the song she dances to ends, Marta and Leon have sex, while others avert their eyes or look confused and shocked. Marta returns to her hotel room, trying not to wake Dario as she searches for her things. Dario wakes and yells at her, asking her where she was. When Marta tells Dario she was dancing with Sylvia, he calls her a liar. Marta tells Dario that if he read her journal he would know why she is lying. He throws Marta on the bed and has anal sex with her while verbally degrading her, and the two finally enjoy sex together for the first time in years.

== Principal cast ==
Actor	Role
Anna Jimskaia	Marta
Riccardo Marino	Leon
Max Parodi	Dario
Nela Lucic	Sylvia
Virginia Barrett	Singer at Restaurant
Tinto Brass	Man with cigar (uncredited)

== Availability ==
The film is available to buy in DVD format on sites such as Amazon.com. The Blu-ray Disc version released on 19 April 2011.
