= Tino Buazzelli =

Italian actor (1922–1980)

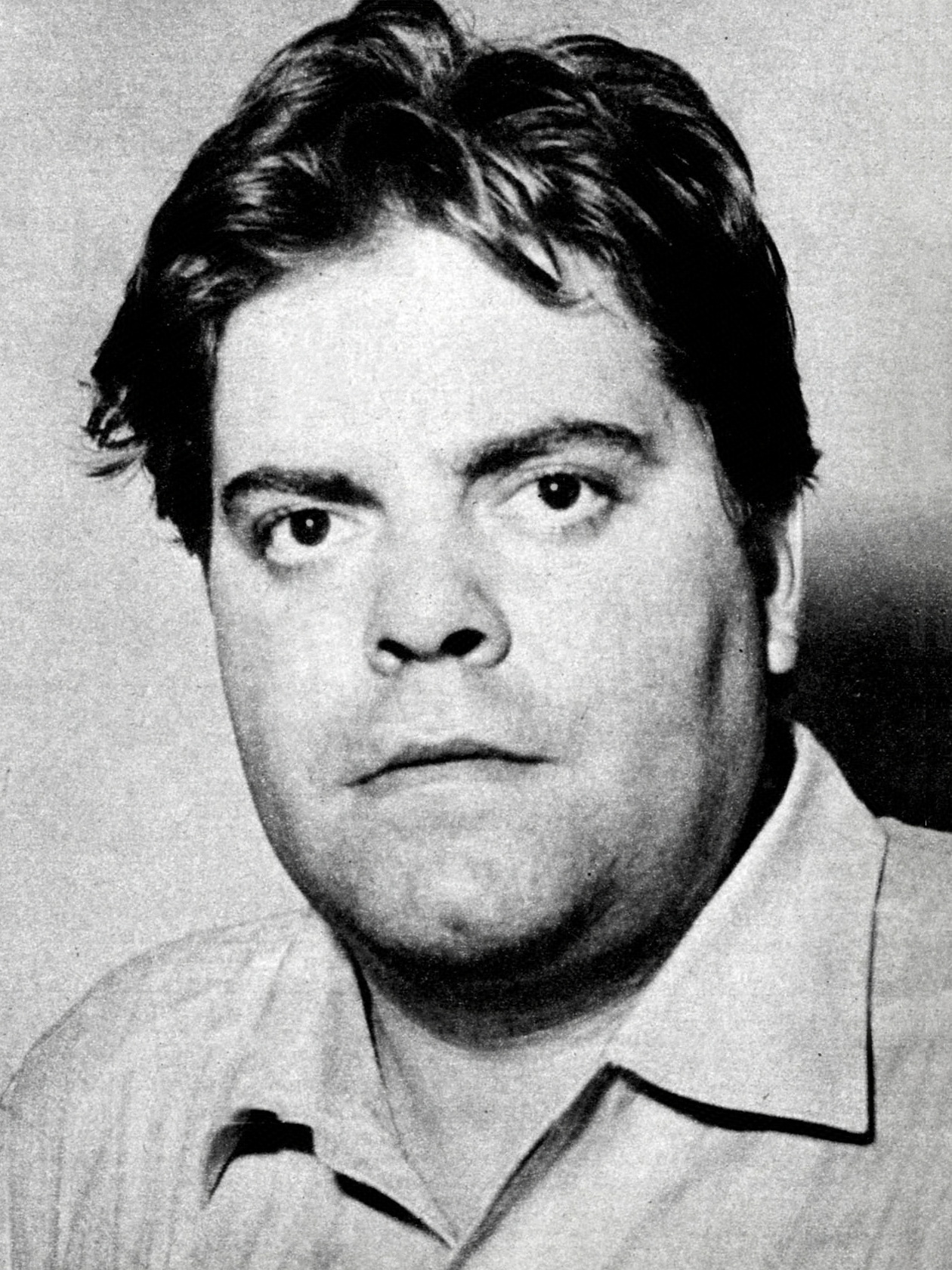
- Tino Buazzelli in 1962
- Born: Agostino Buazzelli; 13 September 1922; Frascati, Italy
- Died: 20 October 1980 (aged 58); Rome, Italy
- Occupation: Actor
- Years active: 1948–1978

Agostino "Tino" Buazzelli (13 September 1922 – 20 October 1980) was an Italian stage, television and film actor. He appeared in 46 films between 1948 and 1978.

After a diploma in education, Buazzelli enrolled at the Accademia d'Arte Drammatica in Rome, graduating in 1946. He made his debut the following year, in the Maltagliati-Gassman stage company. He made his film debut in 1948, in Riccardo Freda's Il cavaliere misterioso. Buazzelli's major successes relate to theatre, notably several stage works played at the Piccolo Teatro in Milan between the 1950s and 1960s, and his performance of Brecht's Life of Galileo (1963) is referred to as the peak of his career. Buazzelli had a significant television success as Nero Wolfe in a series of television films in which he starred between 1969 and 1971.

== Partial filmography ==
- The Mysterious Rider (1948) – Josef, Count Ipatieff's servant (uncredited)
- Guarany (1948)
- The Flame That Will Not Die (1949)
- Vivere a sbafo (1949)
- Margaret of Cortona (1950) – Rinaldo degli Uberti
- The Outlaws (1950) – Marshall Fulvio
- Stormbound (1950) – the sergeant
- Against the Law (1950) – the police commissioner
- Totò Tarzan (1950) – Spartaco
- The Transporter (1950) – Dimitri
- Bluebeard's Six Wives (1950) – Ladislao Tzigety / Bluebeard
- The Count of Saint Elmo (1951) – Baron Annibale Cassano
- The Crowd (1951)
- The Tired Outlaw (1952) – Paco
- I morti non pagano tasse (1952) – Arturo
- Captain Phantom (1953) – Damian Pinto
- The Most Wanted Man (1953) – Parker
- Angels of Darkness (1954)
- Neapolitan Carousel (1954) – Captain Spaccatrippa
- Cardinal Lambertini (1954) – Count Davia
- Toto in Hell (1955) – the secretary devil
- Il conte Aquila (1955) – judge Menghin
- I baccanali di Tiberio (1960) – Tiberius / uncle Anthony
- Il corazziere (1960) – Quirino Lanfranchi
- Ghosts of Rome (1961) – Friar Bartolomeo from Roviano
- Chi lavora è perduto (1963) – Claudio
- Vino, whisky e acqua salata (1963)
- I cuori infranti (1963) – Baron Friedrich von Tellen (segment "La manina di Fatma")
- Ça ira - Il fiume della rivolta (1964)
- Thrilling (1965) – the shrink (segment "Il vittimista")
- A Maiden for a Prince (1965) – the Duke of Mantua
- After the Fox (1966) – Siepi
- Devil in the Brain (1972) – Doctor Emilio Bontempi
