= ABC (magazine) =

Italian magazine, 1960–1977

- Cover of ABC featuring actress Monica Strebel, June 1968
- Categories: Newsmagazine
- Frequency: Weekly
- Founder: Gaetano Baldacci
- Founded: 1960
- First issue: June 1960
- Final issue: 1977
- Country: Italy
- Based in: Milan
- Language: Italian

ABC was an Italian weekly news and political magazine published between 1960 and 1977.

== History and profile ==
The magazine was founded by the former Il Giorno director Gaetano Baldacci in Milan in 1960 as a weekly political, cultural and literary magazine. The first issue appeared in June 1960. Baldacci also directed the magazine.

The graphic of the magazine was curated by the artist Sirio Musso, and was inspired by the popular British newspapers, while contents were often controversial, provocative and polemic. Collaborators of the magazine included Italo Calvino, Luciano Bianciardi, Carlo Levi, Alberto Bevilacqua, Giuseppe Berto, Marco Pannella, Gian Carlo Fusco, Marcello Marchesi and Callisto Cosulich. In June 1963 it introduced the insert ABC dei ragazzi, a supplement comics magazine which lasted 97 issues and ended its publications in October 1965.

In the second half of the 1970s the circulation started to decline, and ABC eventually closed in 1977, after over 800 issues. Occasional attempts of resurrecting the magazine, in 1980 and in 2001, lasted only a few issues.

== See also ==
- List of magazines in Italy
