= Micaela Esdra =

Italian actress and voice actress

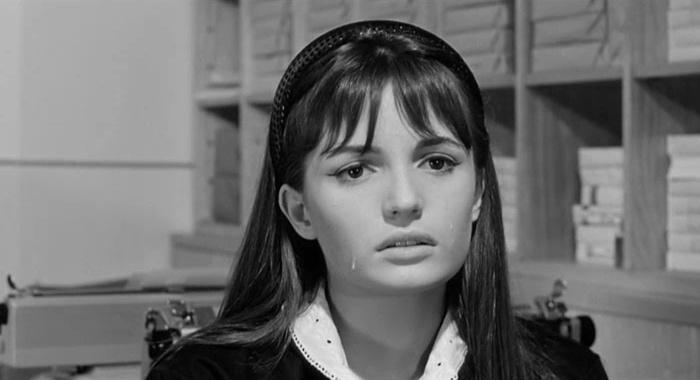
- Esdra in Highest Pressure (1965)
- Born: Micaela Carmosino; 29 January 1952 (age 74); Rome, Italy
- Occupations: Actress; voice actress
- Years active: 1964-present
- Spouse: Walter Pagliaro (m. 1988)

Micaela Esdra (born Micaela Carmosino; 29 January 1952) is an Italian actress and voice actress.

== Biography ==
Esdra began her career in the mid-1960s attending Rina Morelli's acting school and when she was very young, was directed on stage by Giorgio Strehler, Luchino Visconti, and Luca Ronconi.

As a film actress, she starred in several musicarellis and horror films, including Mario Bava's Kill, Baby, Kill. Esdra has been also very active on TV and in film dubbing: during the 1990s, she became the official dubber of Winona Ryder and Kim Basinger.

=== Personal life ===
In 1988, Esdra married stage director Walter Pagliaro.

== Partial filmography ==
- The Adolescents (La Fleur de l'âge, ou Les adolescentes) - 1964
- Made in Italy (1965)
- Highest Pressure (1965)
- Kill, Baby, Kill (1966)
- VIP my Brother Superman (1968)
- A Black Ribbon for Deborah (1974)

== Dubbed actresses ==
- Kim Basinger in My Stepmother Is an Alien, L.A. Confidential, The Burning Plain, Grudge Match and Third Person
- Jane Birkin in Je t'aime moi non plus
- Helena Bonham Carter in Fight Club
- Sandra Bullock in Demolition Man
- Edwige Fenech in The Schoolteacher Goes to Boys' High
- Carrie Fisher in The Blues Brothers
- Melanie Griffith in Lolita
- Daryl Hannah in Blade Runner, Legal Eagles and Roxanne
- Goldie Hawn in Shampoo
- Olivia Hussey in Death on the Nile
- Ashley Judd in Heat
- Jessica Lange in Big Fish
- Winona Ryder in Bram Stoker's Dracula, The Age of Innocence, Little Women, Reality Bites, How to Make an American Quilt, Girl, Interrupted and The Informers
- Kristin Scott Thomas in Random Hearts
- Cybill Shepherd in Taxi Driver
- Tilda Swinton in The Curious Case of Benjamin Button
- Debra Winger in Thank God It's Friday
