= Dropout (film) =

- Promotional poster
- Directed by: Tinto Brass
- Written by: Tinto Brass; Roberto Lerici; Franco Longo
- Produced by: Franco Nero
- Starring: Franco Nero; Vanessa Redgrave; Gigi Proietti; Frank Windsor
- Cinematography: Silvano Ippoliti
- Edited by: Tinto Brass
- Music by: Don Fraser
- Release dates: 18 December 1970 (France); 22 February 1971 (Italy)
- Running time: 109 min
- Country: Italy
- Languages: Italian; English

Dropout is a 1970 Italian romantic drama directed by Tinto Brass. It stars real-life couple, Franco Nero and Vanessa Redgrave. They also worked with Brass a year later on the drama La vacanza. Dropout was released in France on December 18, 1970, followed by a theatrical release in Italy on February 22, 1971.

== Plot ==
Mary (Redgrave) is a disillusioned English banker's wife who meets a troubled Italian immigrant, Bruno (Nero). Mary is captivated by Bruno and they set off on a voyage together. In the course of their voyage, they meet a series of society's dropouts; the unemployed, drug addicts, drag queens, alcoholics and anarchists. They both learn a great deal about life from these misfits.

== Cast ==
- Franco Nero as Bruno
- Vanessa Redgrave as Mary
- Gigi Proietti as Cieco
- Frank Windsor
- Carlo Quartucci
- Gabriella Ceramelli
- Patsy Smart Darcus
- Giuseppe Scavuzzo
- Mariella Zanetti
- Zoe Incrocci
- Sam Dorras

== Production ==
Carlo Ponti had originally agreed to produce the film but when he pulled out, Brass, Nero and Redgrave decided to cover the production costs themselves. Subsequently, shooting commenced on 1 June 1970.
