= Ringo and His Golden Pistol =

1966 film directed by Sergio Corbucci

Johnny Oro
- Italian theatrical release poster
- Directed by: Sergio Corbucci
- Screenplay by: Adriano Bolzoni; Franco Rossetti
- Story by: Adriano Bolzoni; Franco Rossetti
- Starring: Mark Damon; Valeria Fabrizi; Franco De Rosa; Giulia Rubini
- Cinematography: Riccardo Pallottini
- Edited by: Otello Colangeli
- Music by: Carlo Savina
- Production company: Sanson Film
- Distributed by: Metro-Goldwyn-Mayer
- Release date: 15 July 1966 (Italy)
- Running time: 88 minutes
- Country: Italy

Ringo and His Golden Pistol (Italian: Johnny Oro) is a 1966 Italian Spaghetti Western film directed by Sergio Corbucci and starring Mark Damon.

== Synopsis ==
Renamed to cash in on the success of Duccio Tessari's Ringo movies, Ringo and His Golden Pistol focuses on bounty hunter Johnny Oro/Ringo who sees killing as purely business; in fact he will not draw his solid gold pistol unless he can profit from it and this gets him into trouble. He lets Juanito Perez live because there is nothing to gain from killing a man without a price on his head, unlike his brothers, who "Ringo" does kill. Perez swears revenge and faces off with "Ringo". Juanito has formed an alliance with the local Indian chief and is now prepared for an all-out war against the peaceful town and sheriff that are protecting "Ringo".

== Cast ==
- Mark Damon as Jonathan Tomadaro Jefferson Gonzales ("Johnny Oro"/"Johnny Ringo")
- Valeria Fabrizi as Margie
- Franco De Rosa (as Franco Derosa) as Juanito Perez
- Ettore Manni as Sheriff Bill Norton
- Giulia Rubini as Jane Norton
- Loris Loddi as Stan Norton
- Andrea Aureli as Gilmore
- Pippo Starnazza as Matt
- John Bartha as Alcalde Benal
- Vittorio Bonos (as Vittorio Williams Bonos) as Slim Anderson
- Silvana Bacci as Manuela Rodriguez
- Giovanni Cianfriglia as Sebastian
- Lucio De Santis as Carlos Perez
- Ferdinando Poggi as Paco Perez (uncredited)

== Release ==
Johnny Oro was released in Italy on 15 July 1966.
