= Chi lavora è perduto =

1963 film

- Directed by: Tinto Brass
- Written by: Tinto Brass; Gian Carlo Fusco; Franco Arcalli
- Produced by: Moris Ergas
- Starring: Sady Rebbot
- Cinematography: Bruno Barcarol
- Music by: Piero Piccioni
- Release date: 5 December 1963
- Running time: 78 mins
- Countries: Italy; France
- Language: Italian

Chi lavora è perduto (also known as In capo al mondo) is a 1963 Italian drama film directed by Tinto Brass.

In 2008, the film was included on the Italian Ministry of Cultural Heritage’s 100 Italian films to be saved, a list of 100 films that "have changed the collective memory of the country between 1942 and 1978."

== Plot ==
The film follows a day of Bonifacio (Sady Rebbot), a young and unemployed designer with anti-social tendencies. He has applied for a job and has an interview for the psychological test in the morning. The rest of the day, he starts to roam around Venice and recalls his past, also having daydreams about his future. Flashbacks reveal his troubled love affair with his former girlfriend Gabriella (Pascale Audret) and his relationships with his communist friends Claudio (Tino Buazzelli) and 'Kim' (Franco Arcalli).

== Cast ==
- Sady Rebbot - Bonifacio
- Pascale Audret - Gabriella
- Tino Buazzelli - Claudio
- Franco Arcalli - Kim
- Nando Angelini - Sergeant
- Andreina Carli
- Gino Cavalieri
- Piero Vida - Friend of Bonifacio
- Monique Messine
