= La vacanza =

1971 film

- Promotional poster
- Directed by: Tinto Brass
- Written by: Tinto Brass; Roberto Lerici; Vincenzo M. Siniscalchi
- Produced by: Tinto Brass; Franco Nero; Vincenzo M. Siniscalchi
- Starring: Vanessa Redgrave; Franco Nero; Leopoldo Trieste; Corin Redgrave
- Cinematography: Silvano Ippoliti
- Edited by: Tinto Brass
- Music by: Vlady Cnejevici
- Release date: 5 April 1972 (Italy)
- Running time: 101 min
- Country: Italy
- Languages: Italian; English

La vacanza (lit. Italian: The vacation) is a 1971 Italian drama film by Tinto Brass. It stars Vanessa Redgrave and Franco Nero. It premiered at the Venice Film Festival on 4 September 1971 where it was awarded the 'Best Italian Film' prize. This was followed by a theatrical release in Italy on 5 April 1972. A year earlier, Brass, Redgrave and Nero had worked together on the romantic drama, Dropout.

== Plot ==
Immacolata (Redgrave) is a peasant girl and mistress of the count, but when he turns his attentions back to his wife he has Immacolata committed to a mental asylum. 'La Vacanza' is her one-month experimental leave from the institution. She is rejected by her family and subsequently finds new friends in the form of gypsies and an Englishman. But their happiness is blighted by criminal actions and a fight for freedom.

== Cast ==
- Vanessa Redgrave as Immacolata Meneghelli
- Franco Nero as Osiride
- Leopoldo Trieste as Judge
- Corin Redgrave as Gigi
- Countessa Veronica as Iside
- Germana Monteverdi Mercedes as The Countess
- Margarita Lozano as Ra
- Fany Sakantany as Alpi
- Pupo De Luca
- Attilio Corsini
- Osiride Pevarello as Olindo
