= Fallo! =

2003 film

Fallo
- DVD cover
- Directed by: Tinto Brass
- Written by: Tinto Brass; Carla Cipriani; Massimiliano Zanin
- Produced by: Giovanni Bertolucci; Roberto Di Girolamo; Ugo Tucci
- Starring: Sara Cosmi; Massimiliano Caroletti; William De Vito
- Cinematography: Federico Del Zoppo
- Edited by: Tinto Brass
- Music by: Francesco Santucci
- Production companies: Italgest Video; Letizia Cinematografica
- Release date: 2003
- Running time: 90 minutes
- Country: Italy
- Language: Italian
- Budget: $90,000
- Box office: €237,679 (Italy)

Fallo! (also known as Do It! – English translation of Fallo! – and Private) is a 2003 Italian erotic anthology film co-written and directed by Tinto Brass. The title is pun on the term "Fallo!" meaning in Italian both "Do It" and "Phallus" and the plot consists of six independent vignettes.

== Vignettes ==
1. ALIBI: Cinzia celebrates her seventh year of marriage with her husband in Casablanca. The vignette starts with the husband making Cinzia retell her gynecologist's visit with a sexy twist. The husband then arranges for her to have sex with Ali, a hotel worker. He assures a reluctant Cinzia that it will all occur naturally, leading to both the husband and Ali having sex with Cinzia.
2. MONTAGGIO ALTERNATO ("Alternate Montage"): Stefania is the wife of distinguished TV news anchor Luigi who becomes enraged when she finds out her husband is having an affair with Erika. She takes in a new lover in television director Bruno. Includes a scene with brief finger penetration on Federica Tommasi and oral sex on Andrea Nobili.
3. 2 CUORI & 1 CAPANNA ("2 Hearts & 1 Hut"): The sweet Katarina Alto Adige is paid generously to meet with the perverse Frau Bertha, a German dominatrix and her male slave in a small Tyrolean guesthouse. The scheme was concocted by her boyfriend, Neapolitan chef Cyrus, so that they can open his own restaurant.
4. BOTTE D’ALLEGRIA ("Barrel Of Joy"): Raffaella regales her husband with stories of her affairs, some of which are very strange. Her husband enjoys this, and encourages her to keep cheating on him.
5. HONNI SOIT QUI MAL Y PENSE: In the beautiful village of Cap d'Agde, Anna has leisurely fun with Mrs. Helen and her husband, Scottish satirist Mr. Noel.
6. DIMME PORCA CHE ME PIAZE ("Call me a slut, I like it"): Venetian Rosy is on her honeymoon with her husband in London and agrees to a dare that she must have sex in public.

== Principal cast ==
Actor	Role
Sara Cosmi	Cinzia
Massimiliano Caroletti	Gianni
William De Vito	Ali
Maruska Albertazzi	Anna
Raffaella Ponzo	Maid
Virginia Barrett	Frau Bertha
Tinto Brass	Voyeur
