= Bloody Pit of Horror =

1965 film by Massimo Pupillo

- Italian theatrical release poster
- Il boia scarlatto
- Directed by: Domenico Massimo Pupillo
- Screenplay by: Roberto Natale; Romano Migliorini
- Story by: Roberto Natale; Romano Migliorini
- Produced by: Francesco Merli; Ralph Zucker
- Starring: Mickey Hargitay; Walter Brandi; Luisa Baratto; Ralph Zucker
- Cinematography: Luciano Trasatti
- Edited by: Mariano Arditi
- Music by: Gino Peguri
- Production companies: M.B.S. Cinematografica; International Entertainment Corp.
- Distributed by: M.B.S. Cinematografica (Italy); Pacemaker Pictures (US)
- Release dates: 28 November 1965 (Italy); 16 May 1967 (United States)
- Running time: 87 minutes
- Countries: Italy; United States
- Language: Italian
- Box office: ₤65 million

Bloody Pit of Horror (Italian: Il boia scarlatto - The Crimson Executioner) is a 1965 Gothic horror film. The film, set in Italy, was directed by Domenico Massimo Pupillo and stars Mickey Hargitay, Walter Brandi, Luisa Baratto and Rita Klein. It tells the story of a group of women modeling for a photo shoot at a castle, whose owner takes on the identity of the Crimson Executioner, bent on their deaths.

== Plot ==
A group including writer Rick (Walter Brandi); his publisher, Daniel Parks (Alfredo Rizzo); his secretary, Edith (Luisa Baratto); their photographer, Dermott (Ralph Zucker); and five young models enter a seemingly deserted castle to take photos for a horror photonovel. The castle is actually occupied by a former actor, Travis Anderson (Mickey Hargitay).

Anderson initially desires to send the group away but recognizes Edith (once his fiancée) and changes his mind, but decrees the dungeon as off-limits. The group ignores this warning and proceeds to take photos there anyway. This act angers Anderson, who dons a costume and assumes the identity of the Crimson Executioner, who was executed centuries earlier in an iron maiden for the crime of having a private torture chamber. Anderson eventually kills each group member until only Edith and Rick remain. Anderson succumbs to his own torture devices and dies from the poisoned barbs on the "Lover-of-Death" machine. Edith and Rick then escape.

== Cast ==
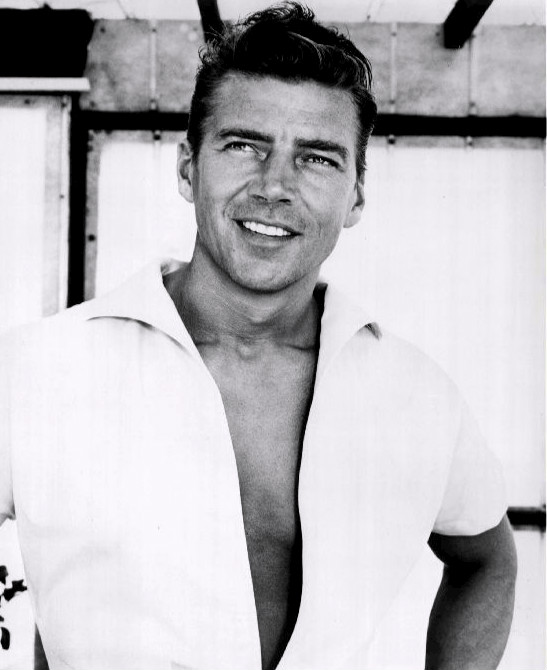
Mickey Hargitay in 1964, one year before the release of Bloody Pit of Horror

- Mickey Hargitay as Travis Anderson
- Walter Brandi as Rick
- Luisa Baratto as Edith
- Ralph Zucker as Dermott
- Alfredo Rizzo as Daniel Parks
- Nando Angelini as Perry
- Albert Gordon as Raoul
- Gino Turini as Henchman #1
- Roberto Messina as Henchman #2
- Barbara Nelli as Suzy
- Moa Tahi as Kinojo
- Morgan Salpietro as Nancy
- Femi Benussi as Annie

== Production ==
Bloody Pit of Horror was produced by Francesco Merli and Ralph Zucker. The screenplay, by Roberto Natale and Romano Migliorini, was developed from their own story. Luciano Trasatti served as the cinematographer, Mariano Arditi as the editor. Gino Peguri composed the score.

The film was shot at Balsorano Castle while interior shots were filmed at Palazzo Borghese, Artena. Hargitay stated that he had little experience in acting, noting that he "wasn't any more of an accomplished actor than a taxi driver", but still felt he provided a good performance in the film.

== Release ==
Bloody Pit of Horror was distributed in Italy by M.B.S. Cinematografica, and released on 28 November 1965, at a runtime of 87 minutes. It grossed a total of 65 million Italian lire on its release. It was released on 16 May 1967, in the United States, distributed by Pacemaker Pictures as a double feature with Terror-Creatures from the Grave. The American version was cut to 74 minutes of predominantly expository scenes. The US promotion of Bloody Pit of Horror made claims that it was based on the writings of the Marquis de Sade. The film was re-released in Italy in 1972 under the title Io...il Marchese de Sade (lit. 'I...the Marquis de Sade')

The complete English-language "friendly" version of the film was released as a special edition DVD by Something Weird Video (distributed by Image Entertainment), and contained the shorter print with deleted scenes included as a supplement. The film has been released numerous times on DVD, with over 20 different releases by various studios. It was released on Blu-ray for the first time in North America by Severin Films in 2021.

== Reception and legacy ==
Critical reception for the film has been mostly negative, with some critics calling it "trashy". In his analysis of the film, Roberto Curti noted its derivation from fotoromanzi and fumetti neri, and dismissed the film as "decidedly campy". Italian critic Roberto Guidotti marked the film as "a comic-strip movie, with a story told through a series of scenes, pictures and pacing that are more akin to comics than cinema. Inside the empty spaces, that open continually, immobilizing the story, one would often be tempted to insert a few captions and balloons". In his book Italian Horror Film Directors, Louis Paul described the film as "a laughable yet disturbing and sadistic entry in the [horror] genre", and "an exercise in homophobia and the debasement of women masked as entertainment".

== See also ==
- List of American films of 1965
- List of films in the public domain in the United States
- List of horror films of 1965
- List of Italian films of 1965
- Extreme cinema
