= Lady Morgan's Vengeance =

- Italian film poster
- Italian: La vendetta di Lady Morgan
- Directed by: Massimo Pupillo
- Screenplay by: Gianni Grimaldi
- Story by: Edward Duncan
- Produced by: Franco Belotti
- Starring: Gordon Mitchell; Erika Blanc; Paul Müller; Barbara Nelli; Michel Forain
- Cinematography: Oberdan Troiani
- Edited by: Mariano Arditi
- Music by: Piero Umiliani
- Distributed by: I.N.D.I.E.F.
- Release date: 16 December 1965 (Italy)
- Running time: 88 minutes
- Country: Italy
- Language: Italian
- Box office: ₤61 million

Lady Morgan's Vengeance (Italian: La vendetta di Lady Morgan) is a 1965 Italian horror film directed by Massimo Pupillo from a screenplay by Gianni Grimaldi, and starring Gordon Mitchell, Erika Blanc, and Paul Müller. The film is about a young aristocratic woman who is murdered by her treacherous husband, and returns as a vengeful ghost.

== Cast ==
- Gordon Mitchell as Roger
- Erika Blanc as Lillian
- Barbara Nelli as Lady Susan Morgan
- Paul Müller as Sir Harold Morgan
- Michel Forain as Pierre Brissac
- Carlo Kechler as Sir Neville Blackhouse
- Edith MacGoven as Terry
- Luciano Catenacci as Physician

== Production ==
Part of the film was shot on-location at Castello Chigi in the Castelfusano section of Rome.

== Release ==
Lady Morgan's Vengeance was distributed in Italy by I.N.D.I.E.F. when it was released on December 16, 1965, as La vendetta di Lady Morgan. It grossed a total of 61 million Italian lire. Unlike Pupillo's other horror films, Lady Morgan's Vengeance only received a theatrical release domestically in West Germany in 1967.

The film was the last horror film Pupillo directed due to his lack of interest in making any more films in the genre; he turned down propositions to make other horror films. Pupillo spoke on the topic, explaining that "I started in the horror genre because I wanted to get out of documentaries, I wanted to enter the commercial market. In Italy, when you do a certain type of film, you become labelled and you can't do anything else. I remember one day, a producer called me to do a film only because the other producers told him he had to get either Mario Bava or me. When I understood this, I felt dead."

The film was released as Lady Morgan's Vengeance on blu-ray by Arrow Video in their box set Gothic Fantastico: Four Italian Tales of Terror on October 18, 2022.

== Reception ==
From retrospective reviews, Roberto Curti, author of Italian Gothic Horror Films, 1957-1969 stated that the film was "by no means the best, but perhaps most peculiar" of the three horror films Pupillo directed. Louis Paul noted in his book Italian Horror Film Directors, that the film was made in a "more careful and studied manner that any of Pupillo's other films as a director" and that the film was "a successful attempt at emulating the better Gothic horror films of earlier years, but by 1966, audiences were tuned into and expecting more from the colorful and violence-soaked horror films other filmmakers were churning out."

== See also ==
- List of horror films of 1965
- List of Italian films of 1965
