= Gian Carlo Fusco =

Italian writer, journalist and actor

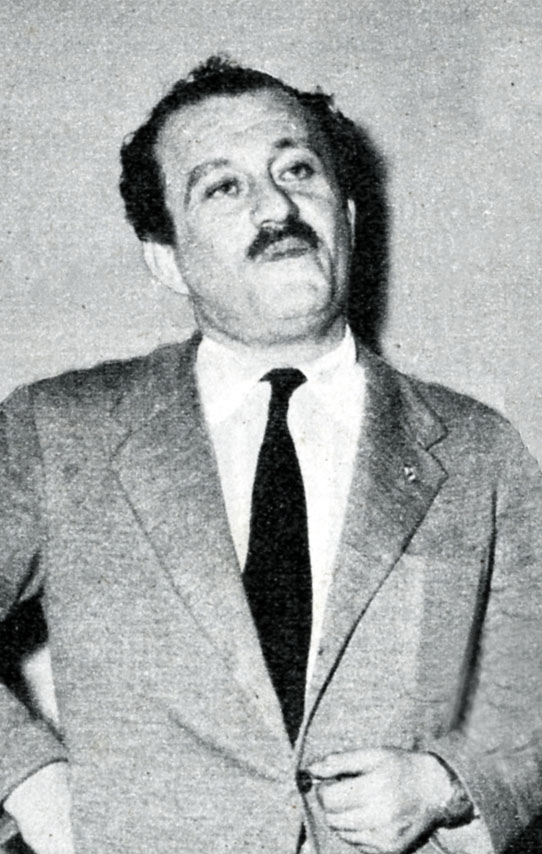
- Born: 1 July 1915; La Spezia, Italy
- Died: 17 September 1984 (aged 69); Rome, Italy
- Occupation: Writer

Gian Carlo Fusco (1 July 1915 – 17 September 1984), sometimes spelled Giancarlo Fusco, was an Italian writer, journalist, screenwriter and occasional actor.

== Biography ==
Born in La Spezia, Fusco spent his childhood in a college in Lucca, and in 1935 he made his writing debut with the novel Biancherie, but the book was blocked by the Fascist censorship because considered defeatist. In 1949 he started his journalistic career working for the magazine Il Mondo, and in 1950 he began collaborating with L'Europeo; he then collaborated with a large number of publications, including L'espresso, II Giorno, Il Giornale d'Italia, ABC and Cronache.

As a writer, Fusco is best known for the semi-autobiographical novel Le rose del ventennio, an ironical recount of the Fascist era. He was also active in the film industry as a screenwriter and an actor.

== Books ==
- Le rose del ventennio (1959).
- La lunga marcia. Italianski, brava gente (1961).
- Guerra d'Albania (1961).
- Gli indesiderabili (1962).
- Quando l'Italia tollerava (1965).
- I mille e una notte. Storia erotica del Risorgimento (1974).
- Duri a Marsiglia: ambienti e protagonisti della malavita romantica degli anni Trenta (1974).
- Il gusto di vivere (1985).

== Selected filmography ==
Year	Film	Worked as		Notes
Year	Film	Writer	Actor	Notes
1947	Le avventure di Pinocchio	Yes		
1952	Benito Mussolini - Anatomia di un dittatore	Yes		Documentary film
1964	Chi lavora è perduto	Yes		
1966	Yankee	Yes		
1968	Attraction	Yes	Yes	
1969	Capricci		Yes	
1970	The Howl	Yes		
1972	Without Family		Yes	
1973	Bella, ricca, lieve difetto fisico, cerca anima gemella	Yes		
1973	Ku-Fu? Dalla Sicilia con furore		Yes	
1973	We Want the Colonels		Yes	
1980	Action	Yes		
1983	Paulo Roberto Cotechiño centravanti di sfondamento		Yes	
