= Villa Grazioli =

Coordinates: 41°47′57″N 12°40′39″E

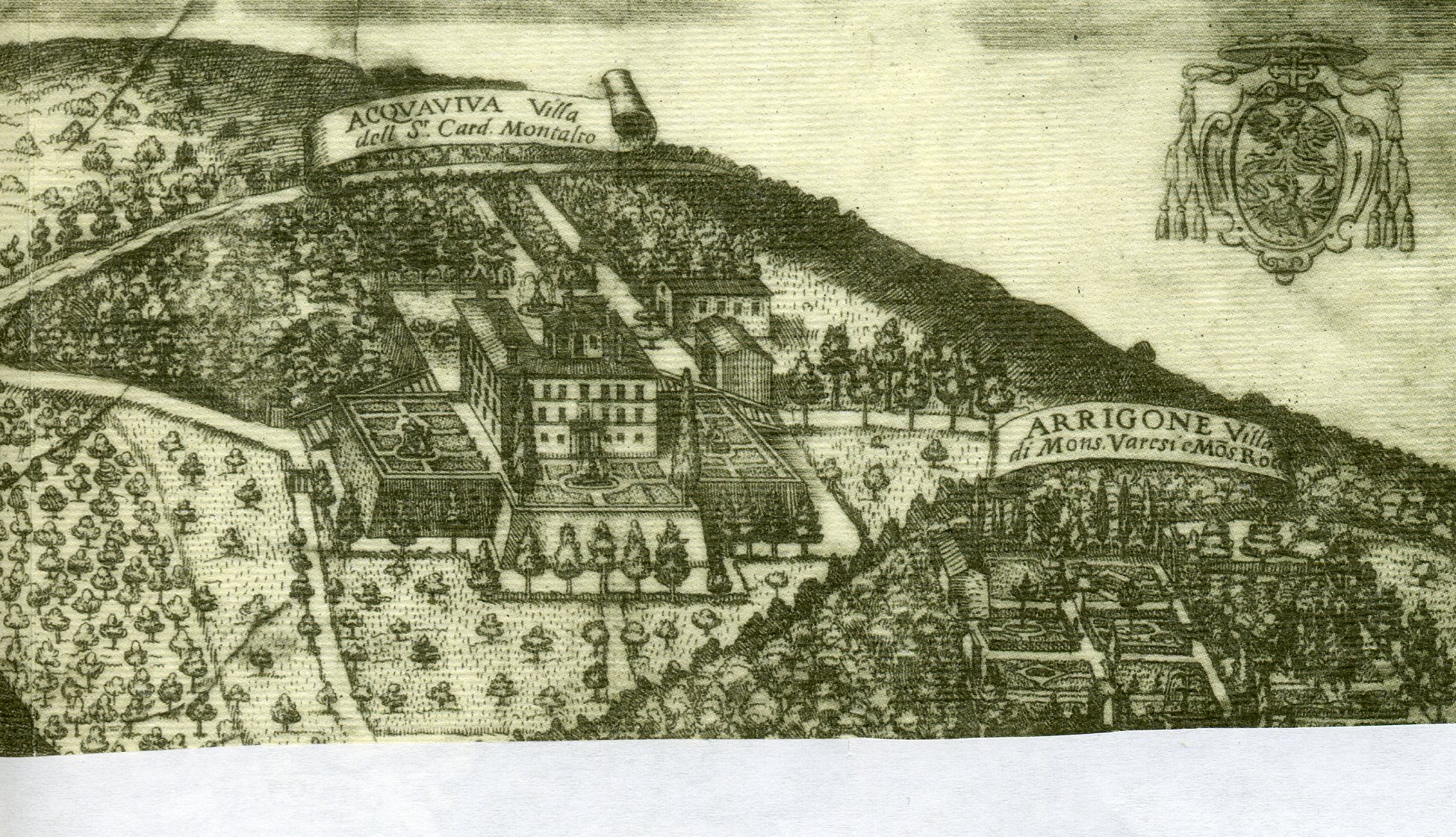
Print by Matteo Greuter, 1620 - Villa Grazioli

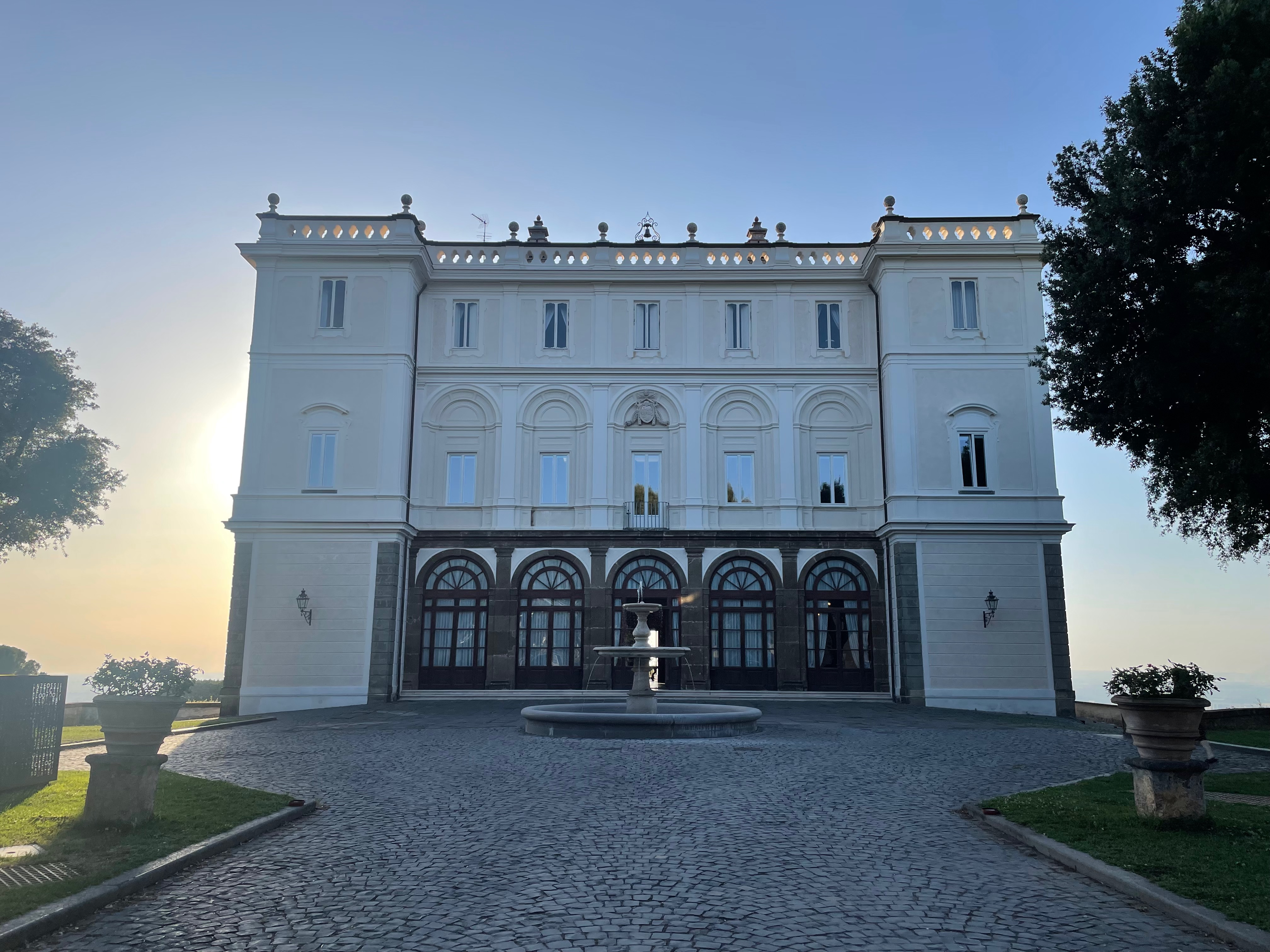
Front facade

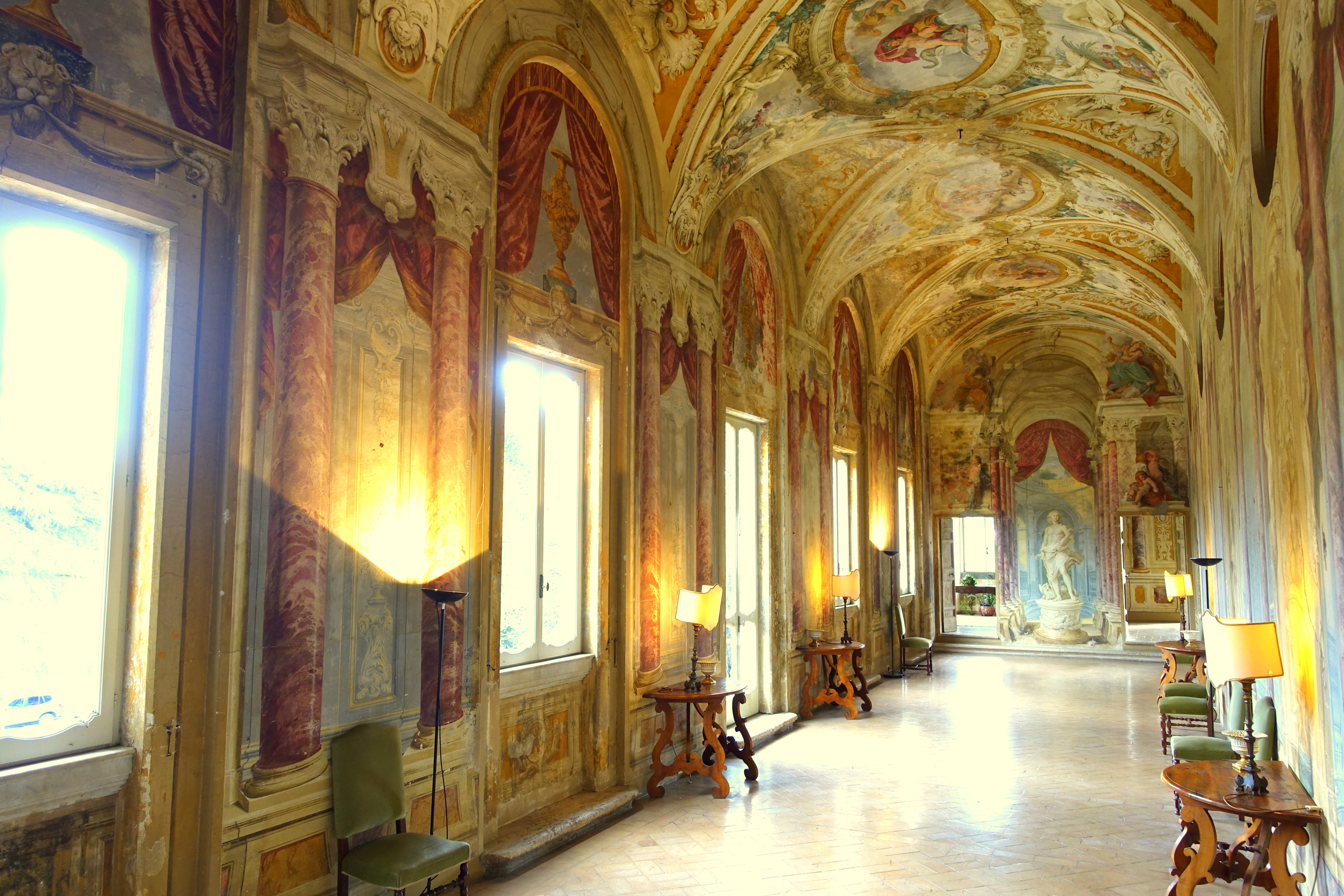
The Pannini Gallery

Villa Grazioli is a villa in Frascati, Italy, now in Grottaferrata communal territory. It is an Italian National monument.

== History ==
According to a memorial stone within the building, on which is inscribed a "brief" by Pope Gregory XIII, Villa Grazioli was completed in 1580 by Cardinal Antonio Carafa to designs by architect Domenico Fontana. After Cardinal Carafa's death in 1582, the Villa became owned by Cardinal Ottavio Acquaviva of Aragon and his brother. After Cardinal Acquaviva's death in 1612, the Villa and its furnishings were purchased by Scipione Borghese, who sold it in 1613 to Cardinal Taverna. One year later, Prince Michele Peretti purchased the Villa, who lived in it with his brother Cardinal Alessandro Damasconi Peretti Montalto, whose name appears in the engravings by Matteo Greuter of Frascati's landscape. The Villa then passed by inheritance to the Savelli family and in 1683 passed to Olivo or Livio Odescalchi, Duke of Bracciano and Ceri (at which time it was known as Villa Bracciano). In 1713 Baldassare Erba inherited the title and the property; between 1723 and 1743, or possibly in 1776, he had the building thoroughly restructured in both form and size. Although it has been claimed that Alphonse Donatien Francois, the Marquis de Sade, was witness to this renewal, this could not have happened between 1723 and 1743, as de Sade was born in 1740; the date of 1766 does, however, align with de Sade's time in Italy.

In 1833 the Collegio Propaganda Fide bought the Villa in 1833; they sold it 10 years later to Duke Pio Grazioli, whose family kept the property for more than a century. In 1943 and 1944, during World War II, the surrounding area was heavily bombed, and the Villa was occupied by squatters, then left in a state of great disrepair. However, in 1987 the Company Villa Grazioli purchased the building and began a thorough restoration of the Villa's architecture, decorations, and park. It has subsequently reopened as a four-star hotel (Park Hotel Villa Grazioli).

== Notable features ==
The Villa is notable for its internal decoration, which has taken place in three periods, corresponding to families who owned the building. In the first period, around 1590, Ottavio Acquaviva commissioned the decoration of the rooms on the main floor, which were completed by 1612. These rooms are now believed to be the work of Agostino Ciampelli (1565–1630), who depicted the villa with paintings of rural life and rustic scenes. The second period corresponds to ownership by the Montalto family. Cardinal Alessandro Montalto commissioned the central panel of the room's vault, which portrays the biblical theme of Eliah and Elyseus in a fresco by painters from the Bologna school. The third period dates to the Odescalchi period; most notably, the first-floor gallery, now known as "Pannini Gallery", was created by Giovanni Paolo Panini. An inventory of the Villa, dated 1743, describes this gallery and names Pannini as its painter.

== Sources ==
- Wells Clara Louisa - The Alban Hills, Vol. I: Frascati - 1878 publisher: Barbera, Rome, Italy - OCLC 21996251
- Il Tuscolo: Paesaggio e Natura, Archeologia e Storia, Arte e Cultura, by Daniela Biancolini et al., Gangemi Editore spa, 2012, page 227. ISBN 9788849274424
- Villa's history, Park Hotel Villa Grazioli
