= Terror-Creatures from the Grave =

- Italian theatrical release poster
- Directed by: Domenico Massimo Pupillo
- Screenplay by: Roberto Natale; Romano Migliorini
- Story by: Roberto Natale; Romano Migliorini
- Produced by: Francesco Merli; Ralph Zucker; Domenico Massimo Pupillo
- Starring: Barbara Steele; Walter Brandi; Mirella Maravidi; Alfredo Rizzo
- Cinematography: Carlo Di Palma
- Edited by: Mariano Arditi
- Music by: Aldo Piga
- Production companies: M.B.S. Cinematografica; G.I.A. Cinematografica; International Entertainment Corp.
- Distributed by: Selecta (Italy); Pacemaker Pictures (US)
- Release dates: June 23, 1965 (Italy); May 16, 1967 (United States)
- Running time: 85 minutes
- Countries: Italy; United States
- Box office: ₤89 million

Terror-Creatures from the Grave (Italian: 5 tombe per un medium) is a 1965 horror film directed by Domenico Massimo Pupillo. The film was an international co-production between Italy and the United States through M.B.S. Cinematografica, G.I.A. Cinematografica and International Entertainment Corp.

== Plot ==
An attorney arrives at a castle to settle the estate of its recently deceased owner. The owner's widow and daughter claim that the late lord could summon the souls of ancient plague victims and that his spirit roams the castle. Soon, friends of the dead lord begin to die in gruesome, violent ways when the dead lord and plague victims return to exact revenge. The reason of the lord's mysterious death is prevailed in the end.

== Cast ==
- Barbara Steele as Cleo Hauff
- Walter Brandi as Albert Kovac
- Mirella Maravidi as Corinne Hauff
- Alfredo Rizzo as Dr. Nemek
- Riccardo Garrone as Joseph Morgan
- Luciano Pigozzi as Kurt, the servant
- Tilde Till as Louise, the maid
- Ennio Balbo as Oskar Stinner
- Steve Robinson
- René Wolf

== Production ==
Before 2015, Ralph Zucker was credited as an alias of Massimo Pupillo, because it was typical for Italian filmmakers to credit themselves under Anglicized names. Producer Ralph Zucker was an American child actor in the early 1950s. In 1958, Zucker moved to Italy to work as an editor and producer. In an issue of Video Watchdog in 1991, Alan Upchurch credited the direction of the film solely to Zucker based on an interview with Walter Brandi, who claimed that Zucker shot the film. A few years later, Lucas Balbo interviewed Pupillo who said he let Zucker be credited as the director as he "didn't care about the film", and that he did not want his name on both this film and Bloody Pit of Horror. Screenwriter Roberto Natale also confirmed Pupillo as the director.

Pupillo stated that he did not get along with actress Barbara Steele on set describing her attitude as "really disgusting". On the fourth day of shooting, Pupillo said he faced her in front of the whole crew and that the two got along after this encounter.

Zucker did direct a few extra scenes that were in the American cut of the film. These included the prologue scenes and the suicide of the character Stinel (Ennio Balbo). Other scenes included in the American cut involved a scene of a horse kicking a man to death.

== Release ==
Terror-Creatures from the Grave was released in Italy on June 23, 1965, where it was distributed by Selecta. It grossed a total of 89 million Italian lire. The film was released on May 16, 1967 in the United States where it was distributed by Pacemaker Pictures as a double feature with Bloody Pit of Horror. On the film's release abroad, Roberto Curti, author of Italian Gothic Horror Films, 1957-1969, stated that Terror-Creatures from the Grave was "perhaps one of the most popular Italian horror films of the decade abroad."

Several home video releases have many different versions of the film. The DVD from Something Weird Video has a running time of 77 minutes and 30 seconds, and includes a nude scene with Mirella Maravidi. This scene is not included in Sinister Cinema's video release, which is four minutes longer due to an extra dialogue scene. Severin Films has released a Blu-ray as part of a boxed set (Danza Macabra Volume Four) which contains two versions, an Italian and the U.S. theatrical cuts.

== Reception ==
In a contemporary review, the Monthly Film Bulletin was disappointed that the "creatures" of the film's title are "confined to the occasional intrusion of a plague-ridden hand or arm", and that the film was "a rather routine and stilted exercise in horror."

== See also ==
- List of American films of 1965
- List of horror films of 1965
- List of Italian films of 1965
