= Massimo Pupillo =

Italian film director (born 1922 died 1999)

- Born: Domenico Massimo Pupillo; 1922; Rodi Garganico, Apulia, Italy
- Occupation: Film director

Domenico Massimo Pupillo (born 1922) is an Italian film director.

== Career ==
Puplillo was born in Rodi Garganico, Apulia in 1922. (Note: Many reference books and websites including the Internet Movie Database carry incorrect information about Pupillo's place of birth and birth year and full name.) He started his career in film through his acquaintance Fernandel as Marcel Pagnol's assistant. He claims to have made over 250 short films before the release of his film Gli amichi dell'Isola, a feature film set in Sardinia with unprofessional actors. After directing Terror-Creatures from the Grave, he went on two direct two more horror films in a row: Bloody Pit of Horror and Lady Morgan's Vengeance.

After making these horror films, Pupillo stated that he originally made them to get out of making documentary films and enter the commercial film market. After making La vendetta di Lady Morgan he declared he was finished with making horror films with his following directorial work becoming scarce. His follow-ups included the Western Django Kills Softly released in 1967 and the mondo film Love: The Great Unknown. Pupillo also wrote a few mondo films prior to directing including Primitive Love and Sweden: Heaven and Hell which were both directed by Luigi Scattini and Taboos of the World by Romolo Marcellini.

Pupillo later described himself as "disgusted" by the type of cinema he was making and primarily worked in television during the 1970s. His last feature film was Sa Jana which was shot in Sardinia. According to Merrill Aldighieri and Lucas Balbo's documentary Mondo Pupillo - Une conversation avec Massimo Pupillo, it is likely that Pupillo died on December 29, 1999, but no evidence has been found to confirm this.

== Partial filmography ==
Title	Year	Credited as		Notes	Ref(s)
Title	Year	Director	Other	Notes	Ref(s)
Terror-Creatures from the Grave	1965	Yes	Yes	Producer	
Bloody Pit of Horror	1965	Yes			
Lady Morgan's Vengeance	1965	Yes			
Django Kills Softly	1967	Yes			

== Notes and references ==
=== Sources ===
- Curti, Roberto (2015). Italian Gothic Horror Films, 1957-1969. McFarland. ISBN 978-1476619897.
- Grant, Kevin (2011). Any Gun Can Play. Fab Press. ISBN 9781903254615.
