= Tinto Brass =

Italian film director (1933–2026)

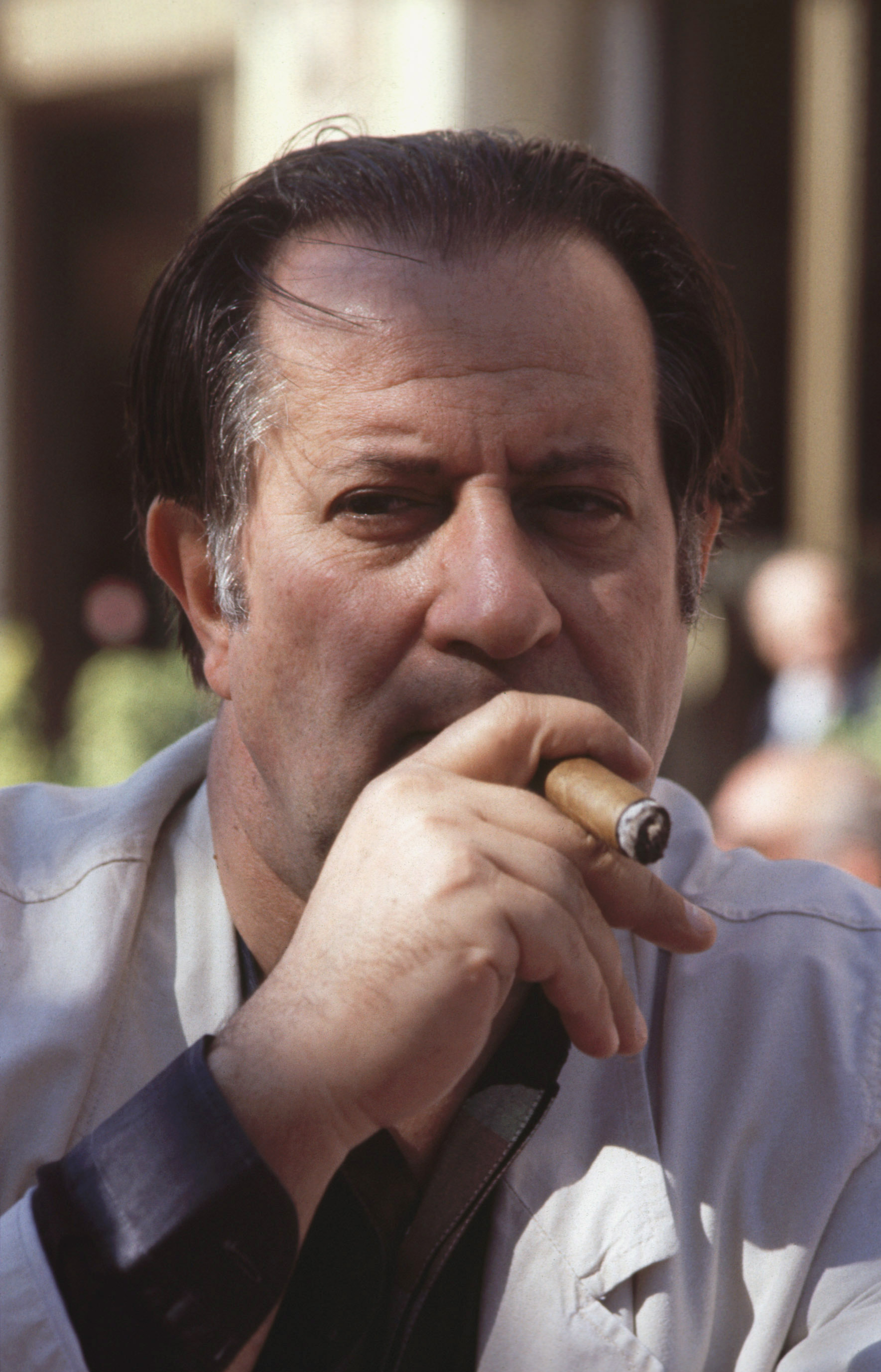
- Brass in 1990
- Born: Giovanni Brass; 26 March 1933; Milan, Italy
- Died: 4 November 2026 (aged 93); Rome, Italy
- Resting place: Campo Verano
- Occupations: Film director; screenwriter
- Years active: 1963–2012
- Political party: Italian Radicals
- Spouses: Carla Cipriani (m. 1957; died 2006) Caterina Varzi (m. 2017)
- Awards: Venice Film Festival: Best Italian Film (1971: La vacanza); HRIFF: Award of Excellence (2012: early works)
- Website: tintobrass.it

Giovanni "Tinto" Brass (26 March 1933 – 4 November 2026) was an Italian film director and screenwriter. In the 1960s and 1970s, he directed many critically acclaimed avant-garde films of various genres. Today, he is mainly known for his later work in the erotic genre, with films such as Caligula, Così fan tutte (released under the English title All Ladies Do It), Paprika, Monella (Frivolous Lola) and Trasgredire.

== Career ==
=== Avant-garde cinema ===
In the 1960s and 1970s, Brass was considered a promising experimental and avant-garde director, and his debut film Who Works Is Lost got favorable reviews after screening at Venice Film Festival 1963. In 1964, he was commissioned by Umberto Eco to create two short films experimenting with visual language for the 13th Triennale di Milano – Tempo Libero and Tempo Lavorativo. Throughout the 1960s and early 1970s, Brass directed films in many genres, including western (Yankee) and crime (Col cuore in gola), all using a very experimental editing- and camera-style. In 1968, Warner Bros. offered Brass the job of directing A Clockwork Orange, which did not happen due to scheduling conflicts, and eventually Stanley Kubrick was given the job. In an article about the filming of Dropout from 1970, he was called the "Antonioni of the 70s". His early period has been referred to as "rebellious, anarchistic and experimental".

L'urlo was shown in competition at Berlin Film Festival 1970. La Vacanza, starring Vanessa Redgrave and Franco Nero won the prize of the film critics for the best Italian film at 1971 Venice Film Festival. In 1972, Brass was a member of the jury at the 22nd Berlin International Film Festival.

=== Erotic cinema ===
After Salon Kitty (1976) and Caligula (1979), the style of his films gradually changed towards erotic films. Caligula was originally supposed to be a satire on power instead of an erotic film, but the producers changed and re-edited the film entirely without Brass's consent, removing many political and comical scenes, and shooting sexually explicit sequences, to make the film a pornographic drama. The director demanded that his name be stricken from the credits, and he is only credited for "Principal Photography". Despite this, the film remains his most widely viewed work (and the highest-grossing Italian film released in the United States). Other notable works of Brass's later period include The Key (1983) and Senso '45 (2002). He was making films into his seventies.

== Personal life and death ==
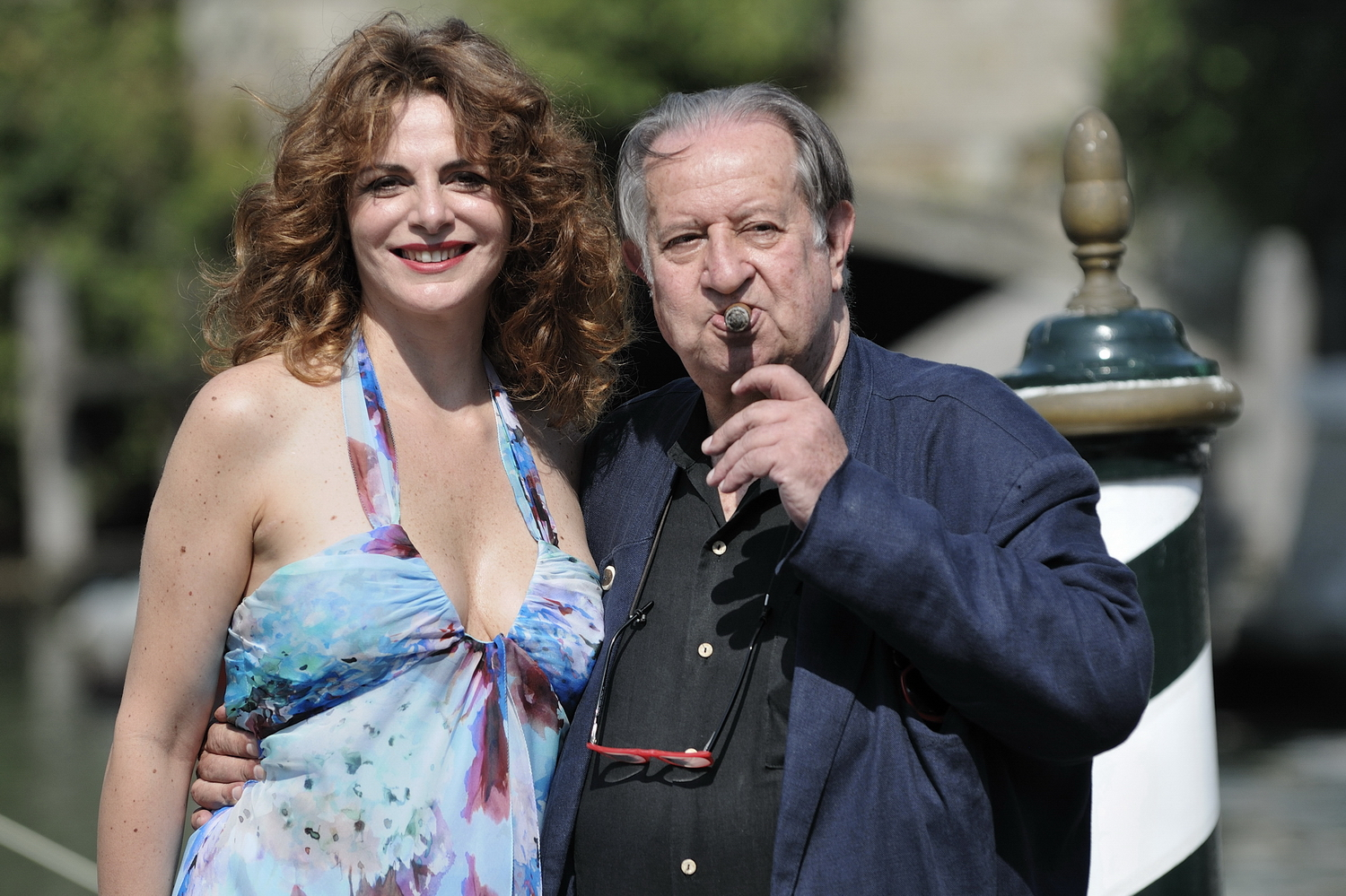
Brass and Caterina Varzi at the 2009 Venice Film Festival

Brass's nickname Tintoretto (later shortened to Tinto) was given by his grandfather Italico Brass, a renowned Gorizian painter.

He was married to Carla Cipriani (born 1930, nicknamed "Tinta") from 1957 until her death in 2006. Carla was the daughter of Harry's Bar founder Giuseppe Cipriani, who managed the restaurant Locanda Cipriani on the Venetian island of Torcello and also collaborated as a screenwriter in Brass's films. The couple had a daughter and a son.

After his wife's death, Brass began a relationship with lawyer Caterina Varzi (b. 1961), who starred in his 2009 short film Hotel Courbet. They married in 2017.

As of 2010, Brass was politically affiliated with the Italian Radicals.

On 18 April 2010, he suffered an intracranial haemorrhage.

Brass died in Rome on 4 November 2026, at the age of 93.

== Retrospectives ==
In 2012, Hollywood Reel Independent Film Festival did a retrospective on Brass's early 1960s and 1970s films, screening newly restored versions.

In 2026, Brass received the Premio Pietro Bianchi from the Italian National Union of Film Journalists (SNGCI) at the 83rd Venice International Film Festival, where a restored version of Col cuore in gola was screened as the pre-opening film.

== Filmography ==
Year	Original title	International title	Note
1963	Chi lavora è perduto	In capo al mondo	
1964	Ça ira – Il fiume della rivolta	Thermidor	Documentary
1964	La mia signora	My Wife	Segments: "L'uccellino", "L'automobile"
1964	Il disco volante	The Flying Saucer	
1966	Yankee	—	
1967	Col cuore in gola	I Am What I Am	
1968	L'urlo	The Howl	
1969	Nerosubianco	Attraction	
1970	Dropout	—	
1971	La vacanza	The Vacation	Also producer
1972	I Miss Sonia Henie	—	Short film
1976	Salon Kitty	—	
1979	Caligula	—	
1980	Action	—	
1983	La Chiave	The Key	
1985	Miranda	The Mistress of the Inn	
1987	Capriccio	Love & Passion, Capri Remembered	
1988	Snack Bar Budapest	—	
1991	Paprika	—	
1992	Così fan tutte	All Ladies Do It	
1994	L'uomo che guarda	The Voyeur	
1995	Fermo posta Tinto Brass	P.O. Box Tinto Brass	Also actor
1998	Monella	Frivolous Lola	
2000	Trasgredire	Cheeky	
2001	SCTMV (Sono come tu mi vuoi)	Know what this is about?	Short film; producer only
2002	Senso '45	Black Angel	
2003	Fallo!	Do It!, Private	
2006	Monamour	—	
2008	Kick the Cock	—	Short film
2009	Hotel Courbet	—	Short film; also producer

=== Filmography as actor ===
- Ultimo metrò, dir. Andrea Prandstraller (1999)
- Impotenti esistenziali, dir. Giuseppe Cirillo (2009)
- Canepazzo, dir. David Petrucci (2012)

== See also ==
- Andrew Blake
- Helmut Newton
- Michael Ninn
- Philip Mond
- Radley Metzger
