= List of Italian films of 1975 =

A list of films produced in Italy in 1975 (see 1975 in film):

Title	Director	Cast	Genre	Notes
Africa Express	Michele Lupo	Giuliano Gemma, Ursula Andress, Jack Palance	Comedy Adventure	
Amici miei	Mario Monicelli	Ugo Tognazzi, Gastone Moschin, Philippe Noiret, Duilio Del Prete, Adolfo Celi, Bernard Blier	Commedia all'italiana	Huge success. 2 sequels. David di Donatello winner
Autopsy	Armando Crispino	Mimsy Farmer, Barry Primus	Giallo-horror	
The Bloodsucker Leads the Dance	Alfredo Rizzo	Femi Benussi, Giacomo Rossi-Stuart, Krista Nell	Horror	
Blue Jeans	Mario Imperoli	Gloria Guida, Paolo Carlini	Erotic drama	
The Boss and the Worker	Steno	Renato Pozzetto, Teo Teocoli	comedy	
Cagliostro	Daniele Pettinari	Bekim Fehmiu, Curd Jürgens, Rosanna Schiaffino	Biographical drama	
Calling All Police Cars	Mario Caiano	Antonio Sabàto, Enrico Maria Salerno, Gabriele Ferzetti	poliziottesco	
The Climber	Pasquale Squitieri	Joe Dallesandro, Stefania Casini	Crime	
Convoy Buddies	Giuliano Carnimeo	Michael Coby, Paul L. Smith	action comedy	
Cry, Onion!	Enzo G. Castellari	Franco Nero, Martin Balsam, Sterling Hayden	Western	Italian-Spanish-West German co-production
The Cursed Medallion	Massimo Dallamano	Richard Johnson, Joanna Cassidy, Ida Galli	Horror	
Di che segno sei?	Sergio Corbucci	Paolo Villaggio, Alberto Sordi, Adriano Celentano, Mariangela Melato	Comedy	
Deep Red	Dario Argento	David Hemmings, Daria Nicolodi, Gabriele Lavia, Macha Méril, Clara Calamai	—N/a	
The Divine Nymph (Divina creatura)	Giuseppe Patroni Griffi	Marcello Mastroianni, Laura Antonelli, Michele Placido, Terence Stamp	Drama	Entered into the 26th Berlin International Film Festival
Le dolci zie	Mario Imperoli	Pascale Petit, Femi Benussi	Commedia sexy all'italiana	
Down the Ancient Staircase	Mauro Bolognini	Marcello Mastroianni, Françoise Fabian, Marthe Keller, Barbara Bouchet	Drama	
Dracula in the Provinces	Lucio Fulci	Lando Buzzanca, John Steiner, Sylva Koscina	—N/a	
Duck in Orange Sauce	Luciano Salce	Monica Vitti, Ugo Tognazzi, Barbara Bouchet	comedy	
Due cuori, una cappella	Maurizio Lucidi	Renato Pozzetto, Agostina Belli, Aldo Maccione	comedy	
Emanuelle's Revenge	Joe D'Amato	Rosemarie Lindt	erotic	
Eyeball	Umberto Lenzi	Martine Brochard, John Richardson	Giallo	
Eye of the Cat	Alberto Bevilacqua	Nino Manfredi, Mariangela Melato, Eli Wallach, Francisco Rabal	Comedy	David di Donatello Best Screenplay
The Exorcist: Italian Style	Ciccio Ingrassia	Ciccio Ingrassia, Lino Banfi	comedy	
Faccia di spia	Giuseppe Ferrara	Adalberto Maria Merli, Mariangela Melato	political drama	
Fantozzi	Luciano Salce	Paolo Villaggio, Anna Mazzamauro	Comedy	
Il fidanzamento	Giovanni Grimaldi	Lando Buzzanca, Martine Brochard, Anna Proclemer	comedy	
Flatfoot in Hong Kong	Steno	Bud Spencer, Al Lettieri, Robert Webber	crime comedy	
The Flower in His Mouth (Gente di rispetto)	Luigi Zampa	Jennifer O'Neill, Franco Nero	Crime drama	
Footprints on the Moon	Luigi Bazzoni	Florinda Bolkan, Peter McEnery, Klaus Kinski	Horror	
Four of the Apocalypse	Lucio Fulci	Fabio Testi, Tomas Milian, Lynne Frederick	Spaghetti Western	
Frankenstein all'italiana – Prendimi, straziami, che brucio de passion!	Armando Crispino	Gianrico Tedeschi, Aldo Maccione, Jenny Tamburi	—N/a	
Gambling City	Sergio Martino	Luc Merenda, Dayle Haddon, Enrico Maria Salerno	poliziottesco	
Il gatto mammone	Nando Cicero	Lando Buzzanca, Rossana Podestà, Gloria Guida	Commedia sexy all'italiana	
A Genius, Two Partners and a Dupe	Damiano Damiani, Sergio Leone	Terence Hill, Patrick McGoohan, Miou-Miou, Klaus Kinski	Spaghetti Western	
Il giustiziere di mezzogiorno	Mario Amendola	Franco Franchi, Aldo Puglisi	Comedy	
God's Gun	Gianfranco Parolini	Lee Van Cleef, Jack Palance, Richard Boone	Spaghetti Western	
Go Gorilla Go	Tonino Valerii	Fabio Testi, Renzo Palmer, Al Lettieri	poliziottesco	
Grazie... nonna	Marino Girolami	Edwige Fenech, Valerio Fioravanti	Commedia sexy all'italiana	
Hallucination Strip	Lucio Marcaccini	Bud Cort, Marcel Bozzuffi	poliziottesco	
The Immortal Bachelor	Marcello Fondato	Monica Vitti, Claudia Cardinale, Vittorio Gassman, Giancarlo Giannini	comedy	
L'ingenua	Gianfranco Baldanello	Ilona Staller, George Ardisson, Orchidea De Santis	Commedia sexy all'italiana	
Kidnap Syndicate	Fernando Di Leo	Luc Merenda, James Mason, Valentina Cortese	poliziottesco	
The Killer Must Kill Again	Luigi Cozzi	George Hilton, Femi Benussi	giallo	
Last Days of Mussolini	Carlo Lizzani	Rod Steiger, Franco Nero, Lisa Gastoni, Henry Fonda	Historical drama	
The Last Day of School Before Christmas	Gian Vittorio Baldi	Macha Méril, Lino Capolicchio, John Steiner, Delia Boccardo	drama	
Last Stop on the Night Train	Aldo Lado	Flavio Bucci, Enrico Maria Salerno	revenge thriller	
The Left Hand of the Law	Giuseppe Rosati	Leonard Mann, Enrico Maria Salerno, Stephen Boyd	poliziottesco	
Legend of the Sea Wolf	Giuseppe Vari	Chuck Connors, Barbara Bach	adventure	
Libera, My Love	Mauro Bolognini	Claudia Cardinale, Adolfo Celi	drama	
La liceale	Michele Massimo Tarantini	Gloria Guida, Gianfranco D'Angelo, Alvaro Vitali	Commedia sexy all'italiana	
Lips of Lurid Blue	Giulio Petroni	Lisa Gastoni, Corrado Pani	drama	
Malía (vergine e di nome Maria)	Sergio Nasca	Turi Ferro, Andréa Ferréol, Alvaro Vitali	comedy-drama	
Manhunt in the City	Umberto Lenzi	Henry Silva, Raymond Pellegrin, Luciana Paluzzi	poliziottesco	
Mark of the Cop (Mark il poliziotto)	Stelvio Massi	Franco Gasparri, Lee J. Cobb, Giorgio Albertazzi	poliziottesco	
Mark Shoots First	Stelvio Massi	Franco Gasparri, Lee J. Cobb, Massimo Girotti	poliziottesco	
La mazurka del barone, della santa e del fico fiorone	Pupi Avati	Ugo Tognazzi, Paolo Villaggio, Delia Boccardo	Commedia all'italiana	
La moglie vergine	Marino Girolami	Edwige Fenech, Carroll Baker	Commedia sexy all'italiana	
Mondo candido	Gualtiero Jacopetti, Franco Prosperi	Christopher Brown, Jacques Herlin, Gianfranco D'Angelo	black comedy	
La novizia	Pier Giorgio Ferretti	Gloria Guida, Lionel Stander, Femi Benussi	Commedia sexy all'italiana	
Nude per l'assassino	Andrea Bianchi	Nino Castelnuovo, Edwige Fenech, Femi Benussi	Thriller	
Paolo Barca, Schoolteacher and Weekend Nudist	Maurizio Lucidi	Renato Pozzetto, Magali Noël, Janet Agren	comedy	
The Passenger (Professione: reporter)	Michelangelo Antonioni	Jack Nicholson, Maria Schneider, Steven Berkoff	Thriller	Spoken in English and Spanish. Entered into the 1975 Cannes Film Festival
Piange... il telefono	Lucio De Caro	Domenico Modugno, Louis Jourdan	Romantic drama	
The Police Can't Move	Luciano Ercoli	Claudio Cassinelli, Arthur Kennedy	poliziottesco	
Private Lessons	Pier Giorgio Ferretti	Carroll Baker, Ron, Leonora Fani	Commedia sexy all'italiana	
Qui comincia l'avventura	Carlo Di Palma	Monica Vitti, Claudia Cardinale	comedy	
Reflections in Black	Tano Cimarosa	John Richardson, Magda Konopka	Giallo	
Return of Shanghai Joe	Bitto Albertini	Klaus Kinski	Spaghetti Western	
Rudeness	Marino Girolami	Leonard Mann, Gianni Russo, Karin Schubert	poliziottesco	
Salò, or the 120 Days of Sodom	Pier Paolo Pasolini	Paolo Bonacelli, Giorgio Cataldi, Umberto Paolo Quintavalle, Aldo Valletti, Caterina Boratto, Franco Merli	Erotic drama	Based on the book The 120 Days of Sodom by the Marquis de Sade. Banned in several countries.
Savage Three	Vittorio Salerno	Joe Dallesandro, Enrico Maria Salerno, Martine Brochard	poliziottesco	
Scandal in the Family	Bruno Gaburro	Michele Placido, Jenny Tamburi	Erotic drama	
The School Teacher (L'insegnante)	Nando Cicero	Edwige Fenech, Vittorio Caprioli, Alvaro Vitali	Commedia sexy all'italiana	
Season for Assassins	Marcello Andrei	Joe Dallesandro, Martin Balsam, Magali Noël, Rossano Brazzi	poliziottesco	
The Sensuous Nurse (L'Infermiera)	Nello Rossatti	Ursula Andress, Duilio Del Prete, Jack Palance	Commedia sexy all'italiana	
Seven Beauties (Pasqualino settebellezze)	Lina Wertmüller	Giancarlo Giannini, Fernando Rey, Shirley Stoler	Comedy-drama	4 Academy Awards nominations
The Sex Machine (Conviene far bene l'amore)	Pasquale Festa Campanile	Gigi Proietti, Agostina Belli, Eleonora Giorgi	sci-fi – sexy comedy	
Sex Pot (La pupa del gangster)	Giorgio Capitani	Sophia Loren, Marcello Mastroianni, Aldo Maccione	comedy	
Silent Action	Sergio Martino	Luc Merenda, Mel Ferrer, Tomas Milian	poliziottesco	
Sins Without Intentions	Theo Campanelli	Jenny Tamburi, Gabriele Tinti, Luigi Pistilli	erotic drama	
Smiling Maniacs	Marcello Aliprandi	Franco Nero, Fernando Rey, Martin Balsam	crime	
Snapshot of a Crime	Mario Imperoli	Erna Schürer, Monica Strebel	giallo	
Substitute Teacher (La supplente)	Guido Leoni	Carmen Villani, Carlo Giuffrè, Dayle Haddon	Commedia sexy all'italiana	
The Suspect	Francesco Maselli	Gian Maria Volonté, Annie Girardot	thriller	
The Suspicious Death of a Minor	Sergio Martino	Claudio Cassinelli, Mel Ferrer	giallo	
Syndicate Sadists	Umberto Lenzi	Tomás Milián, Joseph Cotten	poliziottesco	
So Young, So Lovely, So Vicious...	Silvio Amadio	Gloria Guida, Dagmar Lassander	Comedy-drama	
The Sunday Woman	Luigi Comencini	Marcello Mastroianni, Jacqueline Bisset, Jean-Louis Trintignant	Giallo	
That Malicious Age	Silvio Amadio	Gloria Guida, Nino Castelnuovo	erotic drama	
Ultime grida dalla savana	Antonio Climati, Mario Morra	Narrated by Alberto Moravia	Mondo	Contain purported scenes of genuine human death, though some scenes have been proven to be staged.
Violent Rome	Marino Girolami	Maurizio Merli, Richard Conte	poliziottesco	
Yuppi du	Adriano Celentano	Adriano Celentano, Charlotte Rampling, Claudia Mori, Lino Toffolo	comedy	Entered into the 1975 Cannes Film Festival
Wanted: Babysitter	René Clément	Maria Schneider, Sydne Rome, Vic Morrow	Thriller	French/Italian/German co-production
Waves of Lust	Ruggero Deodato	John Steiner, Silvia Dionisio, Al Cliver	Erotic	
Weak Spot	Peter Fleischmann	Michel Piccoli, Ugo Tognazzi, Mario Adorf	Thriller	
We Are No Angels	Gianfranco Parolini	Michael Coby, Paul L. Smith	action comedy	
White Fang and the Hunter	Alfonso Brescia	Robert Woods, Robert Hundar	Adventure	
White Horses of Summer	Raimondo Del Balzo	Jean Seberg, Frederick Stafford	Drama	
The White, the Yellow, and the Black	Sergio Corbucci	Giuliano Gemma, Tomas Milian, Eli Wallach	Spaghetti Western	
Who Breaks... Pays	Giorgio Ferroni	Giancarlo Prete, Brad Harris	action comedy	
Zorro	Duccio Tessari	Alain Delon, Stanley Baker, Ottavia Piccolo	—N/a	Italian-French co-production

== Footnotes ==
=== References ===
- Curti, Roberto (22 October 2013). Italian Crime Filmography, 1968-1980. McFarland, 2013. ISBN 978-0786469765.
- Curti, Roberto (2017). Italian Gothic Horror Films, 1970–1979. McFarland. ISBN 978-1476629605.
- Gallant, Chris (2000). Art of Darkness: The Cinema of Dario Argento. Fab Press. p. 279. ISBN 1903254078.
- Kinnard, Roy; Crnkovich, Tony (2017). Italian Sword and Sandal Films, 1908-1990. McFarland. ISBN 978-1476662916.
