= Anita Sanders =

Swedish actress and model

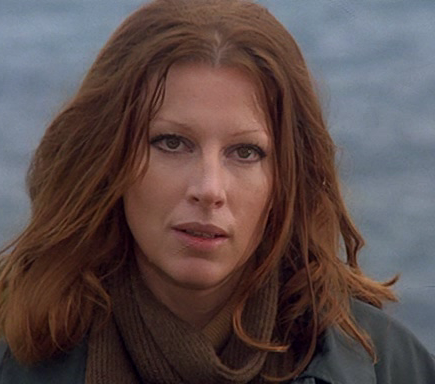
- Sanders in 1975
- Born: Anita Johannesson; 3 April 1942; Sweden
- Died: 18 April 2023 (aged 81); Italy
- Occupations: Film actress, photomodel, assistant director
- Years active: 1964–1975

Anita Sanders (née Johannesson; 3 April 1942 – 18 April 2023) was a Swedish actress and photomodel who was active in the Italian films of the 1960s and 1970s.

== Career ==
Sanders began her film career with a minor role in La fuga in 1965, followed by a topless appearance in Federico Fellini's Juliet of the Spirits, and Elio Petri's The 10th Victim. In 1967, she was cast for the lead role in Tinto Brass-Dino De Laurentiis experimental film Nerosubianco. Her last film as an actress was That Malicious Age of Silvio Amadio in 1975 where she played the supporting role beside Gloria Guida.

After 1975 she had an ephemeral career as an assistant director at Cinecittà.

== Selected filmography ==
- Assault on the State Treasure (1967)
- The Canterbury Tales (1972) – Thomas' wife (scenes removed and lost)
