= Il medium =

- Directed by: Silvio Amadio
- Screenplay by: Claudio Fragasso; Tonino Cucca; Silvio Amadio
- Story by: Silvio Amadio
- Starring: Guido Mannari; Sherry Buchannan
- Cinematography: Maurizio Salvatore
- Edited by: Silvio Amadio
- Music by: Roberto Pregadio
- Production company: Ars Nova Cooperativa S.r.l.
- Release date: 10 March 1980 (Italy)
- Running time: 89 minutes
- Country: Italy

Il medium (transl. The Medium) is a 1980 Italian film directed by Silvio Amadio.

== Cast ==
- Guido Mannari as Paul Robbins
- Sherry Buchanan as Laura
- Stefano Mastrogirolamo as Alan
- Martine Brochard as Daniela
- Philippe Leroy as Professor Power
- Nicoletta Amadio as Anita
- Achille Brugnini as Dr. Vanni
- Vincenzo Ferro as Benedetti
- Mirko Ellis as Anita's husband
- Andrea Aureli as Berto
- Loris Zanchi as Professor Albitzen

== Production ==
Il medium was developed due to director Silvio Amadio's interest in the occult, which he learned through his friend Demofilo Fidani. Fidani was a filmmaker who prominently worked on low budget Italian Westerns, and by the 1980s had become more known for his work in esoterism, including writing some novels on the subject. Amadio and Fidani had discussed their mutual interest in the topic since the 1970s.

Among the screenwriters was Claudio Fragasso, who said he was approached by the director along with a psychic medium who told him that "the dead had told them [he] should write this script." Fragasso also stated that this was the first script he had worked on, even before Meet Him and Die. A film scenario with the same title was in Rome SIAE offices that were dated from October 17, 1975. Filming on Il medium took place much later, starting on May 7, 1979. Among the cast was Martine Brochard, who had little recollection about the making of the film, declaring "I only remember that it all seemed very homemade, and I had a very cold relationship with Amadio. I did my stuff and 'Thanks and goodbye'."

== Style ==
Film historian and critic Roberto Curti stated that despite the film often being labelled a horror film, it was a supernatural drama that involved ghosts, and some such gothic stapes such as a haunted house. Curti noted the film's horrific bits are limited to a dog attack, a burning painting that emits laughter and voices recorded from unknown sources on an audio tape.

== Release ==
Il medium was distributed regionally in Italy on 10 March 1980. The film grossed a total of 15 million Italian lire domestically on its release.
