= Il medico... la studentessa =

1976 film by Silvio Amadio

- Directed by: Silvio Amadio
- Written by: Ferdinando Popoli; Silvio Amadio
- Starring: Gloria Guida
- Cinematography: Antonio Maccoppi
- Music by: Roberto Pregadio
- Release date: 1976
- Country: Italy
- Language: Italian

Il medico... la studentessa (The doctor ... the student) is a 1976 Italian commedia sexy all'italiana directed by Silvio Amadio.

== Plot ==
Claudia is a medical student who encounters many sexual complications with several men.

== Cast ==
- Gloria Guida: Claudia Raselli
- Jacques Dufilho: Colonel Oreste Raselli
- Pino Colizzi: Dr. Filippo Cinti
- Susan Scott: Luisa
- Ric: Attendente
- Enrico Beruschi: Bidello

== See also ==
- List of Italian films of 1976
