= Daniele Formica =

Irish-born Italian actor (1949–2011)

- Born: 10 June 1949; Drogheda, County Louth, Ireland
- Died: 1 February 2011 (aged 61); Bassano del Grappa, Italy
- Occupations: Actor; voice actor; theatre director; playwright; television personality
- Years active: 1973–2011
- Spouse: Ombretta Bertuzzi (m. 1990)

Daniele Formica (10 June 1949 – 1 February 2011) was an Irish-born Italian actor, voice actor, theatre director, playwright and television personality.

Formica was best known for portraying comical characters in various Italian comedy films in the 1980s as well as his roles in the theatre. He also appeared in the 1980 variety comedy television show A tutto gag.

== Biography ==
Born in Drogheda, County Louth, in Ireland, the son of Wilson Formica, an Irish violinist of Italian origin and Eugenia Ravasio, an Italian maid, Formica studied at Trinity College, Dublin, then made his stage debut in the early seventies in Rabelais by Jean-Louis Barrault.

In 1973, Formica moved to Italy where he joined the stage company of the Teatro Stabile dell'Aquila with whom he acted in Maschere by Carlo Goldoni; in those years he made his first appearances in films and TV dramas. He obtained his major successes in the 1980s, taking part to a number of important TV shows, then, from the 1990s, he focused on theatre.

As a voice actor, Formica made several voice acting appearances in at least three Pixar films. He typically dubbed the voices of villainous or minor characters. For example, he voiced Randall Boggs in the Italian dubbed version of Monsters, Inc. as well as Gilbert Huph in the Italian dubbed version of The Incredibles.

== Death ==
On 1 February 2011 Formica died in Bassano del Grappa in Veneto at age 61 of pancreatic cancer.

== Filmography ==
=== Cinema ===
- Cerca di capirmi (1970)
- Bruciati da cocente passione (1976)
- Sex Diary (1976)
- L'amore è un salto di qualità (1977)
- A Dangerous Toy (1979)
- Prickly Pears (1980)
- I'm Getting a Yacht (1980)
- I carabbimatti (1981)
- Camera d'albergo (1981)
- Don't Play with Tigers (1982)
- Rosso veneziano (1989)
- Stelle di cartone (1993)
- Uno a me, uno a te e uno a Raffaele (1994)
- Carogne - Ciro and me (1995)
- Intolerance (1996)
- Ladri si nasce (1997) - Film TV
- Dio c'è (1998)
- Il piazzista (2007)
- Pa-ra-da (2008)
- Ti stramo - Ho voglia di un'ultima notte da manuale prima di tre baci sopra il cielo (2008)
- L'ultima estate (2009)
- Tutta colpa della musica (2011)

== Dubbing roles ==
=== Animation ===
- Randall Boggs in Monsters, Inc.
- Gilbert Huph in The Incredibles
- Dusty Rust-eze in Cars
- Wesley in Home on the Range
- Mr. Willerstein in Meet the Robinsons
- Lofty Thaddeus Worthington in Valiant
- Mr. Gasket in Robots
- JP in Pets

=== Live action ===
- Inspector Gadget in Inspector Gadget 2
- Sheik Abdul ben Falafel in The Cannonball Run
- Sheik Abdul ben Falafel in Cannonball Run II
- Embry Wallis in The Greatest Game Ever Played
- The Whale in The Hitchhiker's Guide to the Galaxy
