= Rosemary Dexter =

British actress (1944–2010)

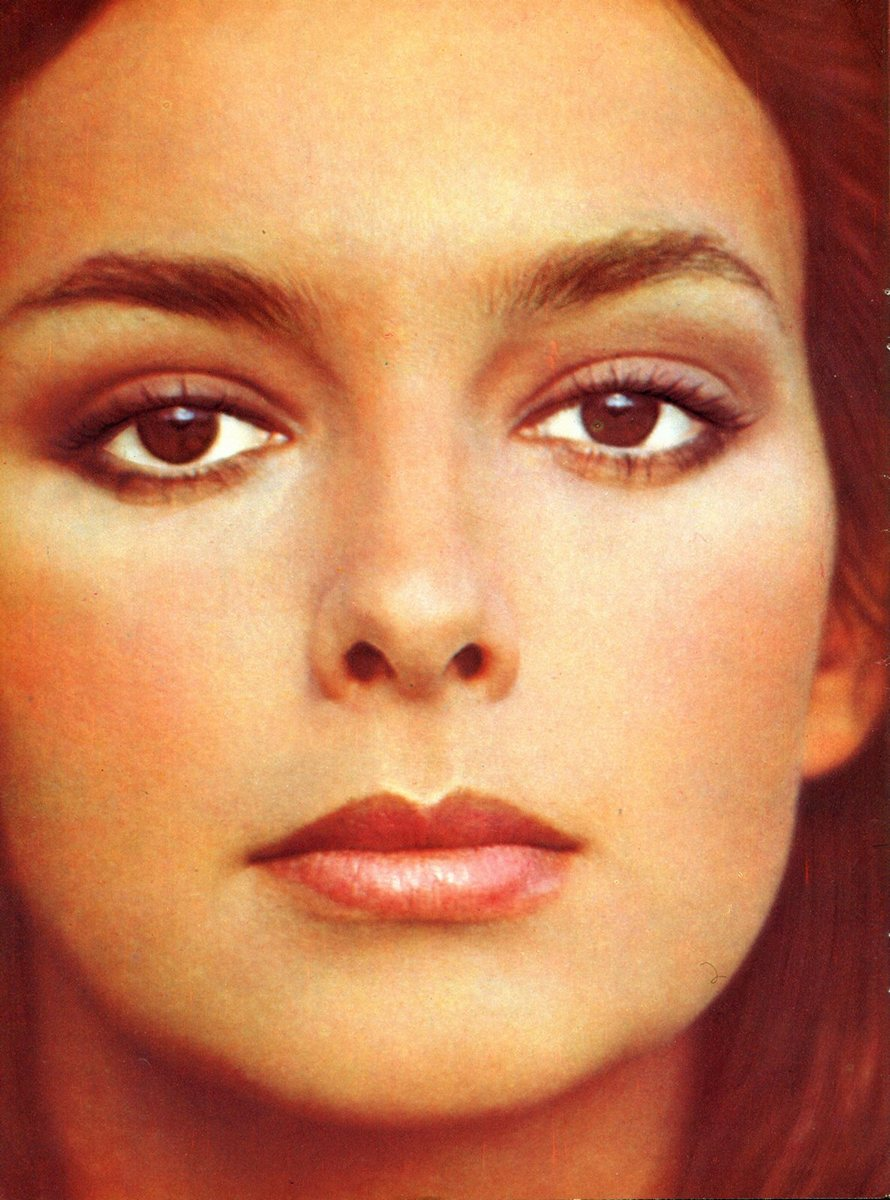
- Dexter in 1970
- Born: Rosemarie Dexter; 19 July 1944; Quetta, British India
- Died: 8 September 2010 (aged 66); Recanati, Italy
- Occupation: Actress
- Years active: 1960s–1970s

Rosemarie Dexter (19 July 1944 – 8 September 2010), best known as Rosemary Dexter, was a British film actress who worked in Italy.

== Life and career ==
Born in Quetta (present day Pakistan) to a British father and an Anglo-Burmese mother, Dexter entered the film industry in 1963, when during a vacation in Rome she met director Ugo Gregoretti who offered her a significant role in his science fiction film Omicron. She then became a very active actress until the mid-seventies, when she retired from acting at age 32.

She was found dead in her house in Recanati, in September 2010. She had been ill for some time.

== Selected filmography ==
- Omicron (1963) - Lucia
- I mostri (1963) - Luciana (segment "Come un Padre") (uncredited)
- Desideri d'estate (1964)
- Romeo and Juliet (1964) - Juliet
- Oltraggio al pudore (1964) - Giovenella
- Male Companion (1964) - L'étudiante / Student (uncredited)
- Casanova 70 (1965) - La cameriera
- Highest Pressure (1965) - Serenella
- For a Few Dollars More (1965) - Mortimer's Sister (uncredited)
- Almost a Man (1966) - Marina
- Per amore... per magia... (1967) - Esmeralda
- The Dirty Outlaws (1967) - Katy
- Gente d'onore (1967)
- The Sex of Angels (1968) - Nancy
- House of Cards (1968) - Daniela
- Partner (1968)
- The Shoes of the Fisherman (1968) - Chiara
- Vendetta for the Saint (1969) - Gina
- Marquis de Sade: Justine (1969) - Claudine
- I quattro del pater noster (1969)
- Blow Hot, Blow Cold (1969) - Laetitia
- Mio Mao: Fatiche ed avventure di alcuni giovani occidentali per introdurre il vizio in Cina (1970) - Jean
- Mazzabubù... Quante corna stanno quaggiù? (1971) - Emma, Lucio's wife
- Come Together (1971) - Ann
- Eye in the Labyrinth (1972) - Julie
- I figli chiedono perché (1972) - Mother of Michèle
- Lui per lei (1972)
- Seven Hours of Violence (1973) - Helena Karlatis
- Sunset, Sunrise, aka Hi wa shizumi, hi wa noboru (1973)
- L'ultimo uomo di Sara (1974) - Anna
- Catene (1974) - Francesca
- La minorenne (1974) - Franca Sanna
- Till Marriage Do Us Part (1974) - Floidia di Maqueda
- Povero Cristo (1975) - Mara (final film role)
