= La casa stregata =

1982 film by Bruno Corbucci

- Theatrical release poster by Renato Casaro
- Directed by: Bruno Corbucci
- Screenplay by: Mario Amendola; Bruno Corbucci; Enrico Oldoini
- Produced by: Mario Cecchi Gori; Vittorio Cecchi Gori
- Starring: Renato Pozzetto; Gloria Guida
- Cinematography: Ennio Guarnieri
- Edited by: Daniele Alabiso
- Music by: Detto Mariano
- Production company: Intercapital Films
- Distributed by: Cineriz
- Release date: 4 March 1982 (Italy)
- Running time: 95 minutes
- Country: Italy

La casa stregata (transl. The Haunted House) is a 1982 Italian comedy film directed by Bruno Corbucci and starring Renato Pozzetto and Gloria Guida.

== Plot ==
In a mythical "Arabian Nights" prologue two crossed lovers are struck by a curse cast unto them by a powerful witch (Lia Zoppelli) who had betrothed her own daughter, Candida, (Gloria Guida) to the evil tyrant Ali Amman, while the girl was passionately in love with "Giorgiafat" (Renato Pozzetto); the witch turns the two lovers into salt statues forcing their disembodied souls to wander for a thousand years before re-incarnating and meeting again.

If they would be able to prolong Candida's virginity until the thousandth anniversary of the curse expires, they will be able to live happily, if not the curse would renew itself.

A thousand years later Giorgio is a young Italian bank clerk who has to move from Milan to Rome for work reasons, promising his girlfriend Candida to find a suitable abode for them and her own mother (again, Lia Zoppelli). After many comical incidents Giorgio finds a luxurious mansion for rent at a ludicrously low price and is soon joined by Candida and her mother.

The couple is soon married, but a series of supernatural incidents prevents them from consummating; the poltergeist activity seems centered around Giorgio's pet dog (a Great Dane who starts talking in a heavy southern accent) and a mysterious character who looks like the faithful servant of "Giorgiafat".

== Cast ==
- Renato Pozzetto as Giorgio Allegri
- Gloria Guida as Candida Melengo
- Yorgo Voyagis as Oscar
- Lia Zoppelli as Anastasia, Candida's Mother
- Angelo Pellegrino as Elpidio
- Leo Gavero as The Bank Manager
- Franco Diogene as The Realtor
- Vittorio Ripamonti as Don Alvino
- Nicola Morelli as Albani
- Bruno Corbucci as The Vet (uncredited)
- Marilda Donà as Lucia

== Production ==
La casa stregata was shot on location in Milan, Rome and at Villa Giovanelli-Fogaccia and DePaolis In.Ci.R. Studios. Among the cast was Gloria Guida, in which this was among her last films he appeared in.

== Release ==
La casa stregata was distributed theatrically by Cineriz on March 4, 1982 in Italy.

== Reception ==
From contemporary reviews, Aldo Vigano of La Stampa criticized Corbucci's direction and found the film to be similar to Giorgio Capitani's film Bollenti spiriti released the previous year. Leonardo Autera of Corriere della Sera complained about the profanity, finding it "repetitive to the point of boredom."

== See also ==
- List of Italian films of 1982
