= Il gatto mammone =

1975 film by Nando Cicero

- Directed by: Nando Cicero
- Written by: Raimondo Vianello; Sandro Continenza
- Cinematography: Alfio Contini
- Music by: Carlo Rustichelli
- Release date: 1975
- Country: Italy
- Language: Italian

Il gatto mammone is a 1975 Italian commedia sexy all'italiana directed by Nando Cicero.

== Plot ==
Sicilian Lollo Mascalucia, a small pasta factory owner has been married to Rosalia for seven years, pretending to all his fellow villagers that he doesn't want a child and so hiding the supposed "sterility" of his wife by various stratagems. Lollo however, after the death of his uncle becomes the only remaining heir of the Mascalucia family, and therefore resumes the idea of becoming a father. So, following an agreement with his wife, he finds a girl who already has a child, and is willing to give him an heir. However, there is no sign of a child, even with the young girl. It's clear now that in fact Lollo is the one who is sterile and not his wife. So instead Rosalia will at last give him the longed-for son and heir, using a "substitute" for her husband.

== Cast ==
- Lando Buzzanca: Lollo Mascalucia
- Rossana Podestà: Rosalia
- Gloria Guida: Marietta
- Franco Giacobini: Priest
- Umberto Spadaro: Doctor
- Grazia Di Marzà: Rosalia's Mother
- Tiberio Murgia: Gipsy
- Renzo Marignano: Urologist

== See also ==
- List of Italian films of 1975
