= Dana Ghia =

Italian actress, singer and model (1932–2024)

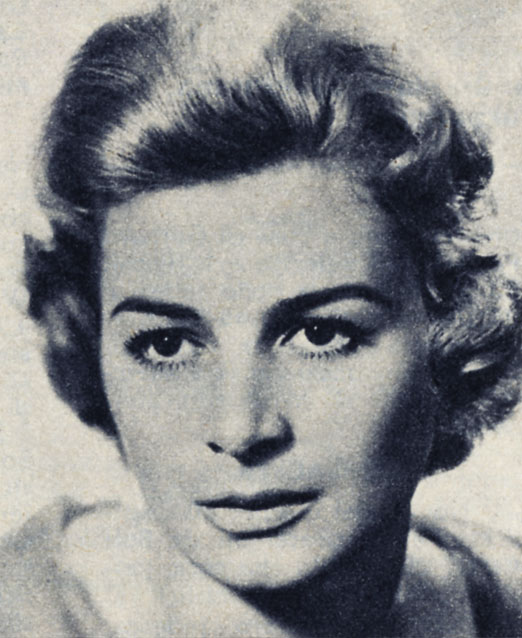
- Ghia in 1959
- Born: Felicita Ghia; 13 July 1932; Milan, Kingdom of Italy
- Died: January 2024 (aged 91); Mori, Italy
- Other name: Ghia Arlen
- Occupation: Actress

Dana Ghia (born Felicita Ghia; 13 July 1932 – 15 January 2024) was an Italian actress, singer, and model. During her acting career, Ghia was sometimes credited as Ghia Arlen.

== Life and career ==
Born Felicita Ghia in Milan, Italy, Ghia started her career as a runway model. She debuted as a singer in 1953, during a student show, then in 1956 she was first noted thanks to the participation on the RAI contest for newcomers Primo applauso. Shortly thereafter Ghia started appearing as a vocalist in several RAI variety shows, and recording several singles. Between 1963 and 1977 she appeared in a number of films and television series, mainly in character roles.

== Selected filmography ==
- Degueyo (1966)
- 4 Dollars of Revenge (1966)
- The Dirty Outlaws (1967)
- Today We Kill... Tomorrow We Die! (1968)
- Wrath of God (1968)
- Police Chief Pepe (1969)
- Burn! (1969)
- Normal Young Man (1970)
- The Priest's Wife (1971)
- Trinity Is Still My Name (1971)
- The Bloodstained Butterfly (1971)
- My Dear Killer (1972)
- Smile Before Death (1972)
- Seven Deaths in the Cat's Eye (1973)
- La svergognata (1974)
- Free Hand for a Tough Cop (1975)
- So Young, So Lovely, So Vicious... (1975)
- The Cursed Medallion (1975)
- California (1977)
- Nine Guests for a Crime (1977)

== Selected discography ==
Singles

- 1958: Come prima/Un sorriso come il sole (Vis Radio, Vi MQN 36130)
- 1958: Melodia d'amore/Pupa piccolina (Vis Radio, Vi MQN 36131)
- 1958: La canzone del faro/Ti voglio ti sogno ti adoro (Vis Radio, Vi MQN 36164)
- 1958: Prendi quella stella/Non partir (Vis Radio, Vi MQN 36165)
- 1958: Anche domani/L'amore senza soldi (Vis Radio, Vi MQN 36312)
- 1958: Napule 'mbraccio a tte/Vicine vicine (Vis Radio, Vi MQN 36313)
- 1958: Non lasciarmi/Melodie d'amore (Vis Radio, Vi MQN 36317)
- 1958: Quand je monte chez toi (Quando salgo da te)/Dors, mon amour (Vis Radio, Vi MQN 36318)
- 1959: The Hula Hoop song/Till (Vis Radio, Vi MQN 36322)
- 1959: Adorami/Tua (con Tony Cucchiara) (Vis Radio, Vi MQN 36335)
- 1959: Per tutta la vita/Tu sei qui (Vis Radio, Vi MQN 36339)
- 1959: Ammore celeste/Scurdammoce 'e ccose d'o munno (Vis Radio, Vi MQN 36476)
- 1959: Primme e doppo/Solitudine (Vis Radio, Vi MQN 36477)

EP

- 1958: The Hula Hoop song/Till/Anche domani/Napule 'mbraccio a te (Vis Radio, Vi MQ 14149)
- 1959: Ammore celeste/Scurdammoce 'e ccose d'o munno/Primme e doppo/Solitudine (Vis Radio, Vi MQ 14169)
