= Fantozzi contro tutti =

- Directed by: Neri Parenti; Paolo Villaggio
- Written by: Paolo Villaggio; Leonardo Benvenuti; Piero de Bernardi; Neri Parenti
- Starring: Paolo Villaggio; Gigi Reder; Camillo Milli; Paul Müller; Plinio Fernando; Giuseppe Anatrelli; Milena Vukotic
- Music by: Fred Bongusto; Josè Mascolo
- Release date: 1980
- Running time: 95 minutes
- Country: Italy
- Language: Italian

Fantozzi contro tutti (Fantozzi against everyone) is a 1980 Italian comedy film is the third film in the saga of the unlucky clerk Ugo Fantozzi, played by its creator, Paolo Villaggio, who turns everyday issues into personal disasters.

It is the first movie in which Fantozzi's wife, Pina, is played by Milena Vukotic. It also marks the final film appearance of actor Giuseppe Anatrelli, who died the following year.

== Plot ==
Italy enters the 1980s: a decade of progress, innovation and tolerance, but not for most of the country and especially for the company where Ugo Fantozzi works, where he still endures oppression and injustice on the part of its directors.

=== Mountain trip ===
Fantozzi's colleague Filini arranges for the entire office to go on a mountain trip to South Tyrol. Once in the mountain town of St. Ulrich, they realize there are no ski runs available, since they arrived in May. To keep a promise made to his wife, Fantozzi checks into a weight loss clinic run by Professor Birkermaier, a sadistic German nutritionist whose inhumane methods include fasting and corporal punishment. Birkermaier has Fantozzi watch him have dinner, but Fantozzi eventually gives in to Birkermaier's teasing and stuffs himself with the food on the table, heedless of the punishment that awaits him.

=== Pina's love triangle ===
Fantozzi's wife Pina reveals to her husband that she has fallen in love with another, mysterious man. After cluelessly investigating the house (where every drawer, cabinet, cupboard, and even the fridge and the dishwasher is filled with bread) and tailing Pina, Fantozzi finds out her secret lover is a young, uncouth and loud Southern Italian man who works at the local bakery. Fantozzi confronts the young baker (who comically refers to him as "Fantozzo"), who instead admits that he never had any interest in Pina, and is in fact disgusted by both Pina and Mariangela's ugliness. Fantozzi returns home to find that Pina has decided to stay with him, having eavesdropped on the conversation between him and the baker.

=== Bicycle race ===
Back at work, as a result of prayers and even Holy Masses by the employees of Megaditta, the 106-year-old Heir Director dies from rubella, much to the joy of all employees. At the director's funeral, his successor is announced to be the fearsome Viscount Cobram, a cycling enthusiast who compels all the employees to take lengthy bike rides each day. Cobram organizes a long-distance bicycle race for the entire staff to compete in. Due to the extremely unfavorable conditions of the track and the employees' general clumsiness and poor physical shape, most of the contenders do not make it to the finish line. However Fantozzi, who is doped on a mysterious drug, manages to win the race but inadvertently throws himself into a hearse that had been prepared for the event.

=== On a cruise ===
Then Fantozzi and Filini are invited by another manager to take a trip on his luxury yacht. However, the two accountants do not know that the man is very bad and makes them slave away as cabin boys. During the segment, the two also continuously annoy and physically damage (obviously by accident) an Englishman owning a nearby sail boat, trying to rely on Filini's (very poor) knowledge of English to communicate their apologies to him.

=== The writing in the sky ===
After an exhausting office meeting, a disgruntled Fantozzi formulates an offensive remark against the Mega-president, wishing for everyone to see it written in the sky, but unexpectedly the phrase actually appears in the sky in his own handwriting. All the employees are screened for graphoanalysis until Fantozzi is found to be the author of the slur. The Mega-president himself appears in archangel attire and forgives Fantozzi, but not before humiliating him by having the name on the writing replaced with Fantozzi's for everyone to see.
