= So Young, So Lovely, So Vicious... =

So Young, So Lovely, So Vicious
- Directed by: Silvio Amadio
- Cinematography: Antonio Macoppi
- Music by: Roberto Pregadio
- Release date: 1975
- Country: Italy
- Language: Italian

Peccati di gioventù, internationally released as So Young, So Lovely, So Vicious..., is a 1975 Italian psychological drama/coming-of-age film directed by Silvio Amadio. The film stars Gloria Guida and Dagmar Lassander.

== Plot ==
Angela is not satisfied with her father's choice for new wife Irene. Angela pretends to be nice with Irene, but privately does everything she can to damage her stepmother-to-be, starting by forcing her boyfriend (Sandro) on her, then when she realizes she is hiding a scandal from her past, schemes to start a lesbian relationship with her in which Sandro will take pictures to blackmail her.

== Cast ==
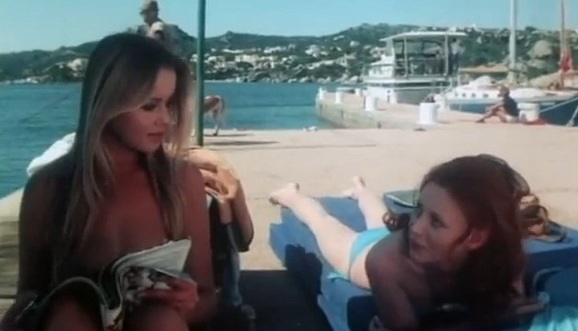
Guida (left) and Lassander (right) in So Young, So Lovely, So Vicious...

- Gloria Guida as Angela Batrucchi
- Dagmar Lassander as Irene
- Silvano Tranquilli as Dr. Batrucchi
- Fred Robsahm as Sandro Romagnoli
- Dana Ghia as Sandro's Lover

== See also ==
- List of Italian films of 1975
