= Prickly Pears (film) =

- Directed by: Steno
- Written by: Steno; Renato Pozzetto; Enrico Vanzina; Sandro Continenza; Raimondo Vianello
- Starring: Renato Pozzetto; Aldo Maccione; Gloria Guida
- Cinematography: Carlo Carlini
- Edited by: Raimondo Crociani
- Music by: Giancarlo Chiaramello
- Release date: 1981
- Running time: 90 minutes
- Country: Italy
- Language: Italian

Prickly Pears (Italian: Fico d'India) is a 1981 Italian comedy film directed by Steno.

== Plot ==
Lorenzo Millozzi is the mayor of a small town. One night, coming home, he surprises the notorious playboy Ghigo Buccilli who tries to seduce his wife: furious, he threatens the two with a gun, so as to cause a heart attack in Buccilli, who is forced to a total rest, and then to remain at the mayor's house...

== Cast ==
- Renato Pozzetto: Lorenzo Millozzi
- Aldo Maccione: Arrigo "Ghigo" Buccilli
- Gloria Guida: Lia Millozzi
- Diego Abatantuono: "Belve" Chief
- Gianfranco Barra: Commissioner
- Daniele Formica: Lanzarotti
- Luca Sportelli: Don Eusebio
- Néstor Garay: The Doctor (brother of Lorenzo)
- Licinia Lentini: Wife of Cicognelli
- Daniele Vargas: The President

== See also ==
- List of Italian films of 1981
