= Being Twenty =

1978 film

- Directed by: Fernando Di Leo
- Screenplay by: Fernando Di Leo
- Story by: Fernando Di Leo
- Produced by: Vittorio Squillante
- Starring: Gloria Guida; Lilli Carati; Ray Lovelock; Vincenzo Crocitti
- Cinematography: Roberto Gerardi
- Music by: Franco Campanino
- Distributed by: Alpherat S.p.a.
- Release date: 14 July 1978
- Running time: 94 minutes (full version); 81 min (censored version)
- Language: Italian

Being Twenty (Italian: Avere vent'anni, also known as To Be Twenty) is a 1978 Italian erotic-drama film directed by Fernando Di Leo and starring Gloria Guida and Lilli Carati. It is probably the most censored and controversial film directed by Di Leo.

The title draws inspiration from a phrase by Paul Nizan, taken from the book Aden Arabia, which is used in the opening credits of the film: "I was twenty, I won't let anyone say those are the best years of your life"

== Plot ==
In the belated wake of the protest and emancipation years of the 1970s, Lia (Gloria Guida) and Tina (Lilli Carati) are two beautiful girls who meet on a beach, and realize that they have a lot in common, describing themselves as young, beautiful and pissed off. They decide to hitchhike their way to Rome to find a commune where they can stay and live the life of free love...or so they think. Nazariota, who runs the commune, alternately demands the girls engage in prostitution and selling encyclopedias door-to-door to support the collective.

During a police search, drugs are found in the commune (planted there by Riccetto, an informant within), and the two girls are to be sent back to their hometowns. While still hitchhiking, they decide to stop at an isolated restaurant, where they are harassed by a group of male patrons. Tina and Lia flee into the woods, where they are caught by the aggressive gang, attacked, raped, and brutally murdered.

== Cast ==
- Gloria Guida - Lia
- Lilli Carati - Tina
- Ray Lovelock - Rico
- Vincenzo Crocitti - Riccetto
- Giorgio Bracardi - Commissario Maresciallo Zambo
- Leopoldo Mastelloni - Arguinas
- Roberto Reale - Head of rapists
- Serena Bennato - Lesbian car driver
- Daniele Vargas - Prof. Affatati
- Vittorio Caprioli - Nazariota
- Licinia Lentini - Lesbian
- Daniela Doria - Patrizia
- Raul Lovecchio - Vice-commissioner (as Raoul Lo Vecchio)
- Fernando Cerulli - Retired civil servant

== Production ==
The film was shot in 1978; the script was set almost a decade earlier. Di Leo's concept was to dramatize the free and emancipated girls who had established themselves in Italian society after the 1968 Sessantotto movement.

== Censorship ==
The film had many problems with censorship, especially because of the very violent ending, in which the two girls are raped and beaten to death, with Tina even impaled with a branch stuck in her vagina. This version was immediately withdrawn from Italian cinemas, cut and extensively re-edited. This re-edited version had the girls survive in an inconclusive "happy ending," which completely changed the meaning of the film.

Di Leo declared, "Gloria Guida and Lilli Carati were much loved by a certain audience, and the fact that I had them killed, raped in that ferocious way, I don't know...probably when the 'romoletto' went to the bar and the 'romoletta' asked him: 'What's Being Twenty like?', he answered, 'We're not going'. While usually if you like a film you say, 'Go and see it'. Having killed those two characters, on an unconscious level, must have influenced the fact that that while this was a film aimed at young people, young people didn't go to see it. It wasn't a failure, because it broke even, but it wasn't the success I thought it would be...".

== Different Versions ==
Just a few days after its October 1978 release, the film was pulled from theaters and re-released with extensive cuts. The deleted scenes included the opening scene on the beach, the lesbian scenes between the two protagonists, and the violent ending.

In this alternate edit, the attack scene is moved to the beginning, then frozen into a still frame with voice over stating that police intervened and saved the girls. The theme of prostitution is diminished, with the girls now ostensibly seeking consensual sex encounters, and ending with them still hitchhiking to somewhere else. This is the only version that was dubbed into English.

The cut version was later released in the summer of 1979, but was not a great success. This version was later released on VHS in Italy and America, and to US cable TV.

In 2004, the director's original version was finally released on DVD, featuring the opening scene on the beach, the lesbian sequences, and the original ending. However, the uncut version was sourced from rougher quality material, while the censored version was sourced from better elements.

== Home Video Release ==
The film was released as a 2-Disc DVD by Raro Video on July 28, 2011. A Blu-Ray upgrade was released in November 2019.
