= Silvio Laurenzi =

Italian actor and costume designer (1936–2021)

- Born: 20 May 1936; Rome, Italy
- Died: 5 November 2021 (aged 85); Rome, Italy
- Occupations: Actor, costume designer

Silvio Laurenzi (20 May 1936 – 5 November 2021) was an Italian actor and costume designer. He was best known for costume designing for over 70 films from 1972 to 2006.

In 2009, he won a gold medal of the Italian film award Una vita per il cinema.

Laurenzi died on 5 November 2021, in Rome, at the age of 85.

== Filmography ==
=== Costume designer ===
- The Case of the Bloody Iris (1972)
- All the Colors of the Dark (1972)
- Il coltello di ghiaccio (1972)
- Torso (1973)
- Gang War in Milan (1973)
- Manhunt in the City (1975)
- Time for Loving (1983)
- Beyond Justice (1991)

=== Actor ===
- I tre nemici (1962)
- La commare secca (1962)'
- Fantômas se déchaîne (1965)
- Assault on the State Treasure (1967)
- The Arena (1974)
- Hot Potato (1979)
- Mi faccia causa (1985)
