= Desideri d'estate =

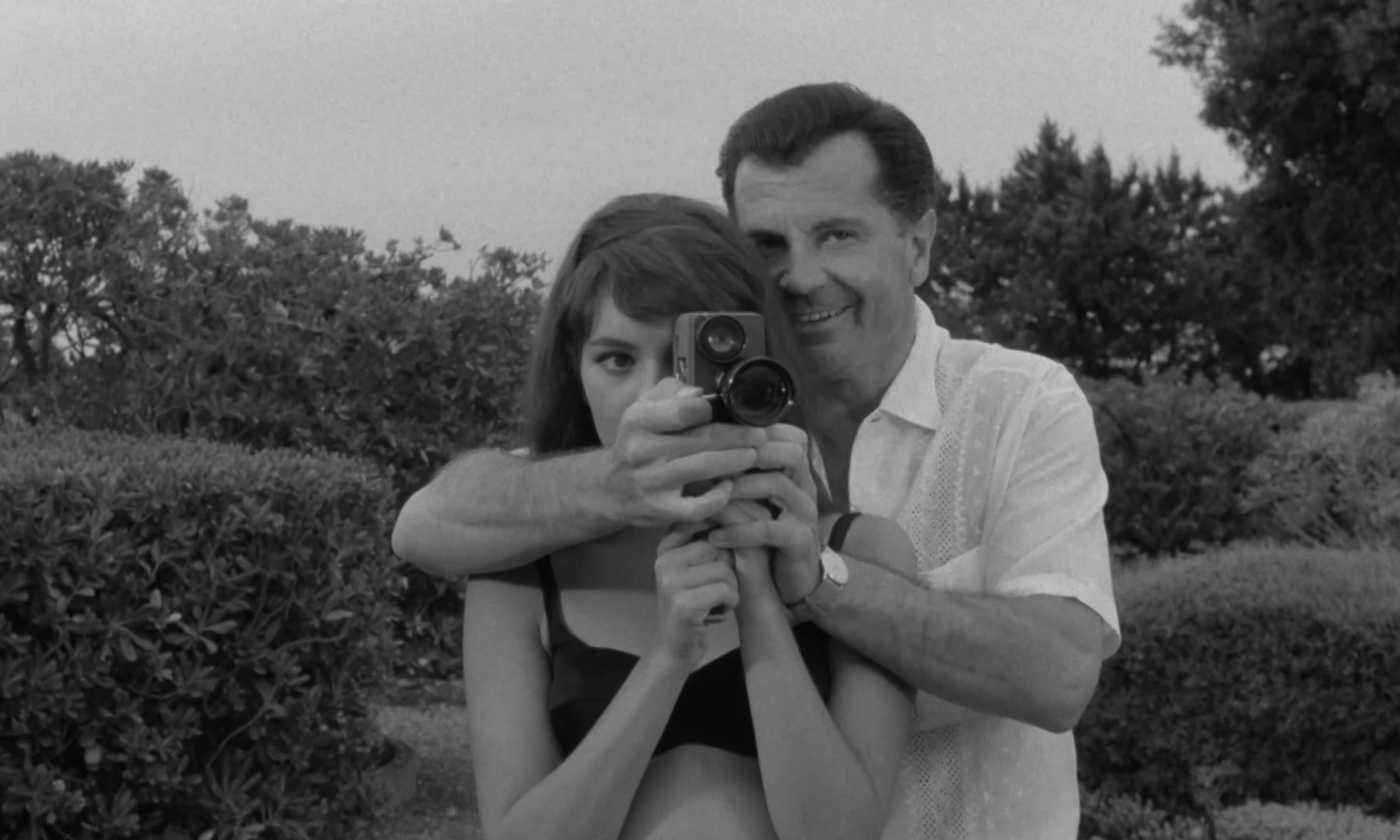
- Directed by: Silvio Amadio
- Cinematography: Franco Villa
- Music by: Gino Peguri
- Distributed by: Variety Distribution
- Release date: 1964
- Country: Italy
- Language: Italian

Desideri d'estate is a 1964 Italian comedy film. It stars actor Gabriele Ferzetti.

== Cast ==
- Gabriele Ferzetti
- Rosemary Dexter
- Jodine Remond
- Cristina Kustermann
