= Beautiful Families =

1964 film

- Film poster
- Directed by: Ugo Gregoretti
- Written by: Ugo Gregoretti
- Produced by: Giuseppe Colizzi; Antonio Musu; Pietro Notarianni
- Starring: Annie Girardot; Totò; Sandra Milo; Adolfo Celi; Angelo Infanti
- Cinematography: Aiace Parolin
- Edited by: Mario Serandrei
- Music by: Armando Trovajoli
- Release date: 26 December 1964
- Running time: 106 minutes
- Country: Italy
- Language: Italian

Beautiful Families (Italian: Le belle famiglie) is a 1964 Italian comedy film directed by Ugo Gregoretti and starring Annie Girardot.

The film's theme comprises four episodes, offering the public a glimpse into the lives of both rich and poor families in Italy during the 1960s.

== Plot ==
=== Episodes ===
==== The Prince Charming ====
Maria, a poor Sicilian peasant, seeks refuge in her letters to the writer Donna Lucrezia, as her family pressures her to marry the coarse Francesco. Donna Lucrezia advises Maria to imagine her family and Francesco differently, but it only complicates matters. Faced with the prospect of joining a convent, Maria initially pursues Francesco, but later changes her mind.

==== The Queen's Bastard ====
A troubled aristocratic couple from northern Italy, Carla and Uberto, navigate their strained relationship. To make Uberto jealous, Carla hires a waiter, expecting disapproval. Surprisingly, Uberto not only approves but also becomes attracted to the waiter.

==== The Grouper ====
Roman playboy Luigi, rejected by his ex Camilla, encounters a German couple on the beach. Seizing an opportunity, Luigi flirts with Trude, leading to a plan to impress his friends. However, their indifference disappoints Luigi. A beach encounter with Trude takes an unexpected turn.

==== To Love Is a Bit Like Dying ====
Filiberto, a factory president, battles illness with support from his caring wife Esmeralda. Advised to stay active, Filiberto exercises while Esmeralda tends to the Marquis Osvaldo. As both men recover, Esmeralda finds a new patient, introducing a twist to the story.

== Cast ==
- Annie Girardot - Maria (segment "Il principe azzurro")
- Jone Salinas - (segment "Il principe azzurro")
- Oreste Palella - (segment "Il principe azzurro")
- Maria Grazia Spadaro - (segment "Il principe azzurro")
- Angelo Infanti - (segment "Il principe azzurro")
- Susy Andersen - Carla (segment "Il bastardo della regina madre") (as Suzy Andersen)
- Nanni Loy - Uberto (segment "Il bastardo della regina madre")
- Hanil Ranieri - (segment "Il bastardo della regina madre")
- Totò - Filiberto Comanducci (segment "Amare è un po' morire")
- Sandra Milo - Esmeralda (segment "Amare è un po' morire")
- Jean Rochefort - Il marchese Osvaldo (segment "Amare è un po' morire")
- Adolfo Celi - Professore Della Porta (segment "Amare è un po' morire")
- Tony Anthony - Luigi (segment "La cernia")
- Susanna Clemm - Trude Muller (segment "La cernia")
- Lars Bloch - Muller (segment "La cernia")
- Maria Grazia Bon - Camilla (segment "La cernia")
