= Smile Before Death =

- Directed by: Silvio Amadio
- Written by: Silvio Amadio; Francesco Villa
- Produced by: Silvio Amadio
- Starring: Jenny Tamburi; Silvano Tranquilli; Rosalba Neri
- Cinematography: Silvano Ippol
- Edited by: Francesco Bertuccioli
- Music by: Roberto Pregadio; Bob Derament
- Release date: 1972
- Running time: 88 minutes
- Language: Italian

Smile Before Death (Italian: Il sorriso della iena, lit. 'Smile of the Hyena') is a 1972 Italian giallo film written and directed by Silvio Amadio, and starring Rosalba Neri.

== Plot ==
Marco, a bankrupt nobleman, is unhappily married to the wealthy Dorothy Emerson. Her best friend, Gianna, is his mistress. Marco murders his wife (making it appear to be suicide by slashing her throat with a shard of glass) and becomes the administrator of his wife's estate, with the proviso that Nancy, Dorothy's daughter from a previous marriage, takes over control when she turns twenty. Marco has retired to live with Gianna in a luxurious lakeshore villa.

Marco's daughter Nancy contacts him to notify him that she will be taking control of her mother's estate very soon. Nancy has been living in a boarding school for years and hadn't seen her mother for a long time. Gianna tries to encourage Marco to kill Nancy, since Marco's standard of living will drop severely once she takes over the estate. But Marco ends up falling in love with Nancy, which complicates the proceedings.

== Cast ==
- Jenny Tamburi as Nancy Thompson
- Silvano Tranquilli as Marco
- Rosalba Neri as Gianna
- Dana Ghia as Magda
- Zora Gheorgieva as Dorothy Emerson
- Hiram Keller as Paolo

== Legacy ==
One of the Roberto Pregadio cues from the soundtrack, "Iena Sequence," featuring vocals by Edda Dell'Orso, was featured as the first track on the 1996 compilation album Beat in Cinecitta. The song became widely known in America for its use in a 2001 Honda Civic commercial called "Cut It Out," where a teenage boy sitting in a back seat between two girls attempts to take a wide stance and is castigated by his older sister who is driving.

== See also ==
- List of Italian films of 1972
