= C'est pas moi, c'est lui =

- Directed by: Pierre Richard
- Screenplay by: Pierre Richard; Alain Godard
- Starring: Pierre Richard; Aldo Maccione
- Music by: Vladimir Cosma
- Production company: Fideline Films
- Release date: 1980
- Running time: 95 minutes
- Country: France
- Language: French

C'est pas moi, c'est lui (transl. It's not me, it's him) is a 1980 French comedy film directed by Pierre Richard. It co-stars Richard and Aldo Maccione, who renew their pairing following the success of the 1978 film Je suis timide mais je me soigne.

== Plot ==
Georges Vallier is a famous screenwriter, author of vaudevilles. He jealously keeps the secret from the existence of his "ghostwriter" Pierre Renaud, without frustrating him. However, he invites Pierre to replace him at a cocktail given by Aldo Barazzutti, an Italian filmstar. While thinking, he is Georges Vallier, Barazzutti asks him to go with him in Tunisia for the screenwriting of his film. Taking the opportunity, Pierre Renaud tells Georges Vallier that he quits working for him and leaves with Barazzutti for Tunisia. He will later reveal the truth by telling him that he is not Georges Vallier. Pierre leaves temporarily his wife Charlotte, about to give birth, in Paris.

He ignores that Barazzutti was using this trip as a pretext to be with his mistress Valérie and Pierre has never had the occasion to reveal his real identity or be part of his project of screenwriting, where he would abandon the vaudeville for more political subjects. Having disputed with her lover and being attracted to what represents the famous Georges Vallier, Valérie takes refuge with Pierre, even if he rejects her. Barazzutti then sets his sight on Anne-Marie, a customer of the hotel married to a military. The arrival at the hotel of the real Georges Vallier messes the plans of Pierre : he has to multiply the stratagems to hide from Vallier while avoiding that he meets Barazzutti. He then discovers that the presence of Georges Vallier comes from the fact that he is the lover of Anne-Marie. It is while she both hides them in a closet that Georges Vallier finally meets Pierre.

== Cast ==
- Pierre Richard as Pierre Renaud
- Aldo Maccione as Aldo Barazzutti
- Valérie Mairesse as Valérie
- Danielle Minazzoli as Charlotte
- Henri Garcin as Georges Vallier
- Annette Poivre as Pierre's mother
- Franca Valéri as Carla
- Gérard Hernandez as the seller
- Frank-Olivier Bonnet as the military
- Bouboule as the mover
- Jacqueline Noëlle as the customer of the hairdressing salon
- Jacques Monnet as the bailiff
