= No, the Case Is Happily Resolved =

- Directed by: Vittorio Salerno
- Written by: Vittorio Salerno; Augusto Finocchi
- Produced by: Angelo Jacono
- Starring: Martine Brochard; Enrico Maria Salerno
- Cinematography: Marcello Masciocchi
- Music by: Riz Ortolani
- Release date: 15 August 1973
- Language: Italian

No, the Case Is Happily Resolved (Italian: No il caso è felicemente risolto) is a 1973 Italian crime drama film written and directed by Vittorio Salerno and starring Enzo Cerusico, Riccardo Cucciolla and Martine Brochard. The finale of the film was re-shot after the distribution company requested a change to the original bleak ending.

== Plot ==
While fishing and listening to a football game, rail worker Fabio Santamaria hears a woman screaming. When he investigates, he discovers a man has beaten a woman to death. He flees. On his way home, he attempts to find a police station to report the crime but gets nervous and continues home. Once there, he is too afraid to report them crime. Eventually, he finds out through the newspaper that the murderer, a distinguished professor, has gone to the police and described him as the murderer. Initially Fabio, still too afraid to go to the police, attempts to cover up his involvement: he buys new sunglasses to replace the pair he lost, he throws away his flannel shirt and boots, shaves off his mustache, and repaints his car. So by the time a priest convinces him to tell the police what he knows, he has incriminated himself (for example, the police find his sunglasses and match his fingerprints) and the police believe Professor Ranieri over him and convict him of the murder. In the original ending a reporter investigating the story, Don Peppino, confronts the Professor, who drives away. In the reshot theatrical release, Don Peppino's confrontation of Professor Ranieri prompts him to kill himself, and a final scene relates that the professor has cleared Fabio of the crime in his suicide note, and so Fabio, cheerful in prison, is expecting release.

== Cast ==
- Enzo Cerusico as Fabio Santamaria
- Riccardo Cucciolla as Professor Eduardo Ranieri
- Martine Brochard as Cinzia
- Junie Vetusto as The Concierge's Daughter
- Enrico Maria Salerno as Giuseppe Ferdinando Giannoli aka "Don Peppino"
- Loredana Martínez as Olga Poddu
- Umberto Raho as Don Giulio
- Claudio Nicastro as Dr. Rocchi, Chief of Police
- Luigi Casellato as Police Inspector
- Enzo Garinei as "Gazzetta Sera"’s editor in chief
- Eleonora Mauro as "Grissino"
- Nazzareno Natale as Augusto
- Gualtiero Rispoli as Marshall Basile

== Release ==
Originally released in 1973, No, the Case is Happily Resolved was released on Blu-ray in 2021 by Arrow as part of its Years of Lead collection.
