= I carabbimatti =

1981 film by Giuliano Carnimeo

- Directed by: Giuliano Carnimeo
- Written by: Giorgio Mariuzzo
- Starring: Andy Luotto; Giorgio Ariani; Daniele Formica; Licinia Lentini
- Cinematography: Giovanni Bergamini
- Edited by: Alberto Moriani
- Music by: Berto Pisano
- Distributed by: Variety Distribution
- Release date: 1981
- Country: Italy
- Language: Italian

I carabbimatti (also known as Two Crazy Cops) is a 1981 Italian comedy film directed by Giuliano Carnimeo and starring Andy Luotto.

== Plot ==
The madcap adventures of two buffoonish Carabinieri police force officers, Ceci and Pasta.

== Cast ==
- Andy Luotto – Matto paranoico
- Giorgio Ariani – Primario di Villa Verde
- Daniele Formica – Carabiniere Ceci
- Licinia Lentini – Amante di Marrone
- Enzo Robutti – Matto
- Enzo Liberti – Infermiere
- Paolo Baroni – Matto
- Lucio Montanaro – Matto
- Guerrino Crivello – L'Elefantiere
- Angelo Pellegrino – Maresciallo
- Ria De Simone – Maria Adele
- Giorgio Bracardi – Matto nostalgico
- Leo Gullotta – Carabiniere Pasta
- Gianni Agus – Commendator Marrone

== See also ==
- List of Italian films of 1981
