= Ian Angus Wilkie =

British actor

Ian Angus Wilkie (born September 1960), is a British actor, probably best known for his recurring role as the Vicar in the sitcom Barbara, though he also appeared in the 1994 short film Blue Christmas, played the title character in CBBC show Mr. Wymi and provided the voice for Hamish in the cult puppet sitcom Pets. He also recently made an appearance as Baron Hardup in a pantomime production of Cinderella at the Broxbourne Civic Theatre in Hoddesdon, Hertfordshire. He has also played the role of the butler in the touring theatre production of Annie. He currently resides in Brighton, Sussex.He is also a tutor at the University of Salford.
