= Alain Godard =

- Born: June 7, 1944; Boulogne-Billancourt, France
- Died: March 13, 2012 (aged 67)
- Occupation: Screenwriter

Alain Godard was a French screenwriter born on June 7, 1944 in Boulogne-Billancourt, France, and who died on March 13, 2012 (aged 67) in Paris.

== Biography ==
Godard was a copywriter at the Publicis agency from 1967 to 1969, managing director of Doyle Dane Bernbach from 1970 to 1976, creative director of Eurocom from 1977 to 1980, creative director (1987–1988) and then CEO (1988–1991) of the Havas Dentsu Marsteller group, and vice-chairman of Euro RSCG from 1991 to 1995.

He is mainly known for his work as a screenwriter.

== Filmography ==
- 1976: Dracula and Son
- 1978: Je suis timide mais je me soigne
- 1979: Coup de tête
- 1980: C'est pas moi, c'est lui
- 1981: Quest for Fire
- 1983: Signes extérieurs de richesse
- 1985: Palace
- 1986: The Name of the Rose
- 1994: Wings of Courage
- 2001: Enemy at the Gates
- 2004: Two Brothers
- 2007: L'Affaire Christian Ranucci : Le Combat d'une mère
- 2009: L'Abolition
- 2011: Black Gold
- 2015: Wolf Totem
