= Je suis timide mais je me soigne =

- Directed by: Pierre Richard
- Screenplay by: Alain Godard; Pierre Richard; Jean-Jacques Annaud
- Produced by: Albina du Boisrouvray
- Starring: Pierre Richard; Aldo Maccione; Mimi Coutelier
- Music by: Vladimir Cosma
- Release date: 23 August 1978
- Running time: 90 minutes
- Country: France
- Language: French

Je suis timide mais je me soigne (lit. 'I'm shy, but I'm treating it') is a 1978 French comedy film directed by Pierre Richard, who co-stars with Aldo Maccione.

== Plot ==
Pierre Renaud, a luxury hotel receptionist, suffers from a crippling case of shyness. He falls in love with Agnès, a guest at his hotel, but finds himself unable to approach her, mistakenly believing she is rich and famous. In reality, Agnès has simply won a contest for a "dream month" that allows her to travel from one luxury hotel to another.

Determined to win her heart, Pierre decides to follow Agnès throughout her entire trip. Along the way, he enlists the help of Aldo Ferrari—an Italian matchmaker and self-styled ladies' man—to coach him so he can finally overcome his shyness and declare his love.

== Cast ==
- Pierre Richard as Pierre Renaud
- Aldo Maccione as Aldo Ferrari
- Mimi Coutelier as Agnès
- Jacques François as Monsieur Henri
- Catherine Lachens as the female truck driver
- Robert Dalban as the garagist
- Jacques Fabbri as the truck driver
- Robert Castel as Trinita
- Jean-Claude Massoulier as Gilles
- Francis Lax as the wine waiter
- Hélène Manesse as Irène

== Additional information ==
- The film was a commercial success, Pierre Richard reformed his collaboration with Aldo Maccione the next year in the film C'est pas moi, c'est lui.
- The film took place in Vichy in the department of Allier, in Nice on the Promenade des Anglais and at the Hotel Negresco, and at Deauville during winter.
