= Giuseppe Anatrelli =

Italian film, stage, and television actor

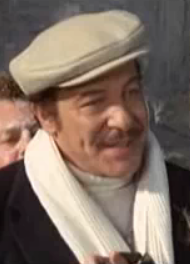
- Anatrelli as Calboni in Fantozzi (1975)
- Born: Giuseppe Anatrelli; 3 January 1925; Naples, Campania, Italy
- Died: 29 November 1981 (aged 56); Naples, Italy
- Occupation: Actor
- Height: 1.77 m (5 ft 10 in)

Giuseppe Anatrelli (3 January 1925 – 29 November 1981), also known as Geppino Anatrelli, was an Italian film, stage and television actor.

Born in Naples, he was part of the Eduardo De Filippo theatrical company between 1953 and 1959. Later he starred again with De Filippo in the 1963 television series Peppino Girella, and rejoined his company in the early 1970s.

His film works span different genres, but he is probably best known for his portrayal of "Geometra Luciano Calboni" in the first three chapters of the Fantozzi film series.

== Filmography ==
Year	Title	Role	Notes
1959	Sogno di una notte di mezza sbornia	Jack Hilton	
1961	Pugni, pupe e marinai	Don Pietro	
1971	Il furto è l'anima del commercio!?...		
1971	In Prison Awaiting Trial	Rosario Scalia	
1973	Sgarro alla camorra	Enrico Cecere	
1974	Piedino il questurino	Pascalone Pera	
1975	Fantozzi	Luciano Calboni	
1975	Il marsigliese	Pascalino Agnone	TV Mini-Series, 2 episodes
1975	The Sunday Woman	The Chief of Police	
1976	Chi dice donna dice donna	The Man	(segment "La donna erotica")
1976	Sex Diary	Lattanzi - the pharmacist	
1976	Il secondo tragico Fantozzi	Geom. Calboni	
1976	Scandalo in famiglia		
1977	Three Tigers Against Three Tigers	Il Marito Della Contessa	
1977	Double Murder	Carru	
1978	Figlio mio, sono innocente!	Ciccillo	
1980	Fantozzi contro tutti	Geom. Calboni	(final film role)
