= Licinia Lentini =

Italian actress and television personality

- Born: 4 March 1959 (age 67); Rome, Italy
- Other names: Lilian Lacy; Licia Lee Lyon
- Occupation: Actress

Licinia Lentini (born 4 March 1959) is an Italian actress and television personality. She was sometimes credited as Lilian Lacy and Licia Lee Lyon.

== Life and career ==
Born in Rome, Italy, Lentini achieved a wide popularity in 1980 as a showgirl in the RAI variety show Studio '80. Her film career includes roles of weight in several genre films and comedy films. She also appeared in several TV serials. From the mid-1980s she focused her career on theater and dubbing.

== Selected filmography ==
- Sturmtruppen (1976)
- Silver Saddle (1978)
- Being Twenty (1978)
- War of the Robots (1978)
- Gardenia (1979)
- Day of the Cobra (1980)
- I carabbimatti (1981)
- Prickly Pears (1981)
- Teste di quoio (1981)
- Vacanze di Natale (1983)
- Crime in Formula One (1984)
- L'allenatore nel pallone (1984)
- Il commissario Lo Gatto (1987)
- Django 2 (1987)
- My Name Is Tanino (2002)
- Vanilla and Chocolate (2004)
