= Assault on the State Treasure =

1967 film by Piero Pierotti

- Directed by: Piero Pierotti
- Written by: Gianfranco Clerici; Piero Pierotti
- Produced by: Fortunato Misiano
- Starring: Roger Browne; Anita Sanders; Franco Ressel
- Cinematography: Augusto Tiezzi
- Edited by: Jolanda Benvenuti
- Music by: Angelo Francesco Lavagnino
- Production company: Romana Film
- Distributed by: Romana Film
- Release date: 4 August 1967
- Running time: 84 minutes
- Country: Italy
- Language: Italian

Assault on the State Treasure (Italian: Assalto al tesoro di stato) is a 1967 Italian action film directed by Piero Pierotti and starring Roger Browne, Anita Sanders and Franco Ressel. The film has a film typical for a heist film, with criminals planning to rob the money transferred from or to a bank.

== Plot ==
Four criminals plan to rob a twenty million dollar transfer between an Arab central bank and a British oil company.

== Cast ==
- Roger Browne as Johnny Quick
- Anita Sanders as Shanda Lear
- Franco Ressel as Elias
- Sandro Dori as Otto Linnemann
- Dina De Santis as Helga
- Tullio Altamura as Lodz
- Olga Solbelli as Madame Angot
- Antonietta Fiorito
- Angela De Leo
- Lucio Casoria
- Silvio Laurenzi
- Zuccolo Di Spilimbergo
- Renato Montalbano as Ben Aisham
- Valentino Macchi as Record Oil Company board member
- Rosy De Leo
- Lina Franchi as Teresa Simona
- Gianni Baghino as Ahmed
- Daniele Vargas as Kaufman
- John Stacy as President of the Record Oil Company

== Bibliography ==
- Peter Cowie & Derek Elley. World Filmography: 1967. Fairleigh Dickinson University Press, 1977.
