= Nerosubianco =

- Directed by: Tinto Brass
- Written by: Tinto Brass; Francesco Longo; Giancarlo Fusco
- Produced by: Dino De Laurentiis
- Starring: Anita Sanders
- Cinematography: Silvano Ippoliti
- Edited by: Tinto Brass
- Music by: Freedom
- Release date: 26 February 1969
- Running time: 85 mins
- Country: Italy
- Languages: Italian; English

Nerosubianco, styled as nEROSubianco and also released with the international title Attraction, is an Italian black comedy (part collage film) directed by Tinto Brass. The film deals with a variety of contemporary themes such as sexual freedom, racial tensions, and political radicalism from the perspective of a young upper-class Italian woman. The film has also been titled rather exploitatively like The Artful Penetration of Barbara and as Black on White, a literal translation of the Italian title.

Nerosubianco shooting began in October 1967 and it was premiered at the 1968 Cannes Film Festival. The film saw theatrical release in February 1969.

== Plot ==
Barbara (Anita Sanders) has accompanied her husband Paolo (Nino Segurini) to London. He leaves her at Hyde Park for his business transactions and Barbara starts sightseeing, soon to realise that an African American man (Terry Carter) is luring her. She sees it as an opportunity for an adventurous outreach to a new world and as her observations intermingle with her fantasies, she begins to question her own life.

== Cast ==
- Anita Sanders: Barbara
- Terry Carter: the man
- Nino Segurini: Paolo
- Umberto Di Grazia: psychic/himself
- Tinto Brass: gynecologist (cameo)
- Freedom: chorus
