= Sex Pot (1975 film) =

1975 film

- Italian theatrical release poster by Renato Casaro
- Directed by: Giorgio Capitani
- Screenplay by: Ernesto Gastaldi; Tom Rowe
- Based on: "Collared" by Cornell Woolrich
- Produced by: Carlo Ponti; Zev Braun
- Starring: Sophia Loren; Marcello Mastroianni; Aldo Maccione; Pierre Brice
- Cinematography: Alberto Spagnoli
- Edited by: Francesco Malvestito; Renato Cinquini
- Music by: Piero Umiliani
- Production companies: Delphi Film Co. Les Films Concordia
- Distributed by: United Artists Europa
- Release date: 17 April 1975
- Running time: 90 minutes
- Countries: Italy; France
- Language: Italian

Sex Pot (Italian: La pupa del gangster, lit. 'The Gangster's Moll') is a 1975 Italian crime comedy film directed by Giorgio Capitani, and starring Sophia Loren and Marcello Mastroianni. Alternative titles for the film in the English language include Poopsie & Co., Gun Moll, Get Rita, Lady of the Evening, Oopsie Poopsie and Poopsie.

The film is loosely based on a short story by American author William Irish (Cornell Woolrich); while the source material is serious crime fiction, the Italian adaptation makes the criminal setting veer into comedy by depicting the situations as farcical, and the gangsters and "though guys" characters as foolish and immature.

== Plot ==
Gangster Charlie Colletto (Mastroianni) oversees a prostitution ring around Milan. One day, police deputy commissioner Salvatore Lambelli helps a red-haired prostitute (Loren) who is being mistreated by Chopin, Charlie's dim-witted enforcer. Later, when Charlie meets the woman in person, he becomes utterly besotted with her because her hair color reminds him of his childhood crush, Rita Hayworth. He makes her his official paramour, christening her Pupa ("Babe").

Charlie's infatuation causes him to become jealous, possessive and abusive, leading Pupa to hope he gets killed or caught. She eventually starts a relationship with Lambelli.

During an argument with Anna, another of his lovers, Charlie inadvertently kills her when his gun goes off; Charlie and Chopin then frantically try to pin the blame on Anna's boyfriend, but Pupa eventually outwits them both by gathering incriminating evidence against Charlie. Forced into hiding, Charlie then tries to eliminate Pupa.

Following a prolonged slapstick car chase, Lambelli arrests Charlie and Chopin, setting Pupa free. The story ends with Charlie and Chopin in prison, while Pupa and Lambelli enrich themselves by heading the League for the Protection of Prostitutes (abbreviated as PRO PRO).

== Cast ==
- Sophia Loren as Pupa
- Marcello Mastroianni as Charlie Colletto
- Aldo Maccione as Chopin
- Pierre Brice as Deputy Commissioner Salvatore Lambelli
- Nazzareno Natale as Franco Botta
- Mario Maranzana as Police inspector
- Alvaro Vitali as cab driver
- Leopoldo Mastelloni as drag performer
- Dalila Di Lazzaro as Anna Chino
- Ester Carloni as Ester, Salvatore's aunt
- Clara Colosimo as doorwoman
- Renzo Marignano as night club patron
- Gianni Bonagura as "American Hotel" receptionist

== Production ==
La Pupa del gangster showcases Sophia Loren and Marcello Mastroianni, two of Italy's main film stars at the time; the two had co-starred in several previous films, including the comedies Yesterday, Today and Tomorrow (1963), Marriage Italian Style (1964) and The Priest's Wife (1970), and would reunite again twice, notably in the drama A Special Day two years later. The film was produced by Carlo Ponti—Loren's husband—in association with American producer Zev Braun and the French studio Les Films Concordia. While the story takes place in and around Milan and some scenes were shot there and in the nearby city of Varese, filming took place for the most part in Rome, including some interiors at Cinecittà studios.

== Reception ==
The film performed well commercially in Italy, ranking 49th at the Italian box office for the 1974-75 season. However, it did not prove as popular and enduring as Mastroianni and Loren's other pairings; critic Paolo Mereghetti was dismissed of the picture, commenting in his Dictionary of Films that the performers appeared to have more fun than the audience.

A 2017 review said La Pupa del gangster deserved a reappraisal, citing the clever pastiche of crime films, performances and spectacular final car chase, and finding particular merit in Aldo Maccione's turn as the inept henchman and in Alvaro Vitali's cameo as a cartoonish cab driver.

== Home video ==
The film was reissued in DVD, and on streaming on La7cinema.
