= Sesso e volentieri =

1982 film by Dino Risi

- Directed by: Dino Risi
- Edited by: Alberto Gallitti
- Music by: Fred Bongusto
- Release date: 1982
- Country: Italy
- Language: Italian

Sesso e volentieri is a 1982 Italian anthology-comedy film directed by Dino Risi. The film consists in ten segments, all starred by Johnny Dorelli and all having sex and sexual perversions as main theme.

== Cast ==
- Johnny Dorelli: marito/fidanzato/Erminio Pacilli/Dott. Franceschi/cliente/corteggiatore/Giacomo Giovanardi/Stelio Rafazzoni/sposino
- Laura Antonelli: Carla De Dominicis/giovane procace donna/princess
- Gloria Guida: fidanzata/moglie/centralinista telefonica/amante/sposina
- Giuliana Calandra: Carla's mom
- Margaret Lee: Jane McDonald
- Yorgo Voyagis: the suitor
- Jackie Basehart: the prince
- Giucas Casella: himself
- Pippo Santonastaso: the jealous barber
- Venantino Venantini
- Renato Scarpa

== See also ==
- List of Italian films of 1982
