= Scandalo in famiglia =

1976 film by Marcello Andrei

- Directed by: Marcello Andrei
- Written by: Marcello Andrei
- Starring: Gloria Guida
- Cinematography: Luciano Trasatti
- Music by: Enrico Simonetti
- Release date: 1976
- Country: Italy
- Language: Italian

Scandalo in famiglia (Scandal in the family) is a 1976 Italian commedia sexy all'italiana directed by Marcello Andrei.

== Plot ==
Elena loves her uncle, but she is forced to marry a nobleman. The only solution is the adultery. So she still keeps her erotic feelings towards her uncle.

== Cast ==
- Gloria Guida: Elena
- Carlo Giuffrè: the uncle
- Gianluigi Ghirizzi: Saverio
- Lucretia Love: Nunziata
- Ines Pellegrini
- Loredana Martinez
- Gianni Nazzaro
- Luciana Turina
- Mario Maranzana
- Giuseppe Anatrelli

== See also ==
- List of Italian films of 1976
