= Le Bourreau des cœurs =

- Directed by: Christian Gion
- Written by: Christian Gion
- Starring: Aldo Maccione; Anna Maria Rizzoli
- Cinematography: Lionel Legros
- Edited by: Nicole Saunier
- Music by: Éric Demarsan
- Release date: 1983
- Language: French

Le Bourreau des cœurs (The Heartbreaker) is a 1983 French comedy film written and directed by Christian Gion and starring Aldo Maccione.

The film was a commercial success, finishing 24th at the 1983 French yearly box office with 1,652,422 tickets.

== Plot ==
Vittorio, an actor confined to figurative roles, dreams of becoming a movie star. After winning a television competition, "The King of Cinema", he was noticed by Japanese producers and hired to play the role of an actor in a film shot in Tahiti.

== Cast ==
- Aldo Maccione as Vittorio Garibaldi
- Anna Maria Rizzoli as Ginette
- Jean Parédès as Max
- André Nader as Pedro
- Nico il Grande as Jésus
- Jole Silvani as the mother
- Max Desrau as the father
- Hubert Lassiat as the grandmother
- Gillian Gill as the sister
- Jean David Junior as Bébert
- Diego Ferrari as Jeannot
- Guy Lux as himself
- Florence Guérin as the starlet
