= Primo applauso =

Italian variety show

Primo applauso was an Italian variety show, broadcast on Rai 1 (at the time "Programma Nazionale") in 1956.

The program marked the television debut of Enzo Tortora, who was initially picked only to play the role of assistant of Silvana Pampanini, but after a few episodes, following the sudden departure of Pampanini became the main presenter.

An early talent show, it consisted a contest between young aspiring entertainers who were voted through a clap-o-meter. It launched the careers of several notable personalities, including the singers Adriano Celentano and Dana Ghia and the illusionist Silvan. It inspired and named a musical comedy film, Primo applauso, directed by Pino Mercanti and starring Claudio Villa.
