= Wolves of the Deep =

1959 film

- Film poster
- Directed by: Silvio Amadio
- Written by: Silvio Amadio; Gino De Santis; Carlo Romano
- Starring: Massimo Girotti
- Cinematography: Luciano Trasatti
- Music by: Bruno Canfora
- Release date: June 1959
- Running time: 100 minutes
- Country: Italy
- Language: Italian

Wolves of the Deep (Italian: Lupi nell'abisso) is a 1959 Italian drama film directed by Silvio Amadio. It was entered into the 9th Berlin International Film Festival.

== Cast ==
- Massimo Girotti as Comandante
- Folco Lulli as Nostromo
- Alberto Lupo as Radiotelegrafista
- Jean-Marc Bory as Tenente
- Horst Frank as Lo Sposino
- Piero Lulli as Teppista
- Giancarlo Sbragia as Idrofonista
- Giorgio Cerioni as Marinaio Ferito
- Nino Dal Fabbro as Meccanico
- Enrico Salvatore as Marinaio
- Alberto Barberini as Marinaio
