= La minorenne =

- Directed by: Silvio Amadio
- Written by: Marino Onorati
- Starring: Gloria Guida
- Cinematography: Antonio Maccoppi
- Music by: Roberto Pregadio
- Distributed by: Variety Distribution
- Release date: 1974
- Country: Italy
- Language: Italian

La minorenne (The minor) is a 1974 Italian commedia sexy all'italiana directed by Silvio Amadio. The author Adriano Tentori referred to the film as "a piece of 1970s fashion history, where the sexy body of Gloria Guida performs masterfully".

== Plot ==
A young woman walking along a country road is menaced, then attacked by circling motorcyclists. A well-groomed man in a trench coat watches.

Later, she is in the care of some nuns at what appears to be a girls' school, where we find out her name is Valeria. She receives a medical examination, during which her vision blurs. She likes the young doctor, and they kiss. While they are kissing, the other schoolgirls burst into the room. They subdue the doctor, much to her amusement, and tear his clothes off. They do something apparently very painful to him using a pair of forceps. The same well-groomed, trenchcoated gentleman reappears. It may have all been a daydream.

Later, the girls give a young nun a hard time by being unruly in the woods. The young nun chases Valeria, who takes pity on her when she collapses under a tree to catch her breath. They sit together and talk, but are reprimanded by an older nun, who seems to have rounded up the other girls. The young nun is dismissed and the older nun scolds Valeria, who proceeds to lean against a tree and daydream about a bishop and some nuns who tie her to a St. Andrew's cross and lash her with a whip. She is rescued by the young nun, who seizes the whip and chases away the others, and then she is joined by the schoolgirls, all wearing corsets. This daydream is apparently interrupted when the trenchcoated man inevitably reappears.

After a graduation ceremony in which the bishop we saw earlier expounds on the importance of family values, Valeria travels to the villa of her well-to-do father, who is the trench-coated man haunting her previous fantasies. Trying to fit back into family life, she meets a beachcomber artist, her randy brother, a pair of wacky priests, and a cast of other local characters, and is caught up in their various intrigues, many of which are sexual in nature and manage to result in various states of undress. Valeria is mostly quiet and wide-eyed through all this, only barely involved and often observing rather than participating. The various sexual hijinks of her family members and friends are not always healthy, and many carry an underlying hint of menace, including implied rape, non-consent, and voyeurism. At the end, she is seemingly reconciled with the pleasures of nature and with a sense of personal integrity with the beachcomber artist.

== Cast ==
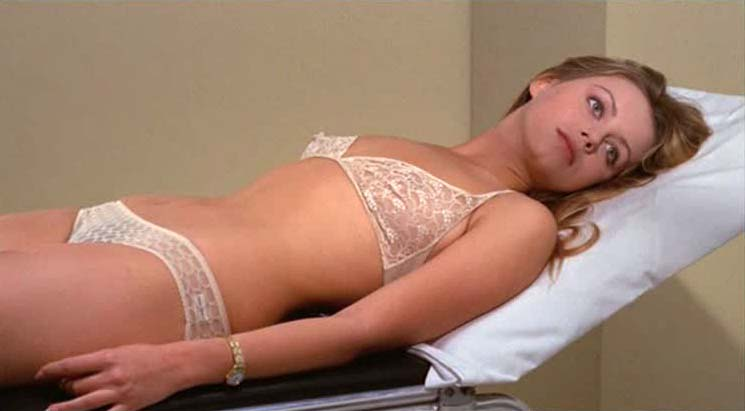
Guida as Valeria in the film

- Gloria Guida as Valeria Sanna
- Rosemary Dexter as Franca Sanna, mother of Valeria
- Marco Guglielmi as Massimo Sanna, father of Valeria
- Corrado Pani as Spartaco, the artist
- Giacomo Rossi Stuart as Carlo Salvi
- Silvio Spaccesi as The Uncle Priest
