= Double Murder =

1977 film by Stefano Vanzina

- Film poster
- Directed by: Steno
- Written by: Agenore Incrocci; Furio Scarpelli; Steno
- Produced by: Roberto Infascelli
- Starring: Marcello Mastroianni
- Cinematography: Luigi Kuveiller
- Edited by: Antonio Siciliano
- Music by: Riz Ortolani
- Release date: 23 December 1977
- Running time: 120 minutes
- Country: Italy
- Language: Italian

Double Murder (Italian: Doppio delitto) is a 1977 Italian giallo film directed by Steno.

== Cast ==
- Marcello Mastroianni as Bruno Baldassarre
- Agostina Belli as Teresa Colasanti
- Ursula Andress as Princess Dell'Orso
- Peter Ustinov as Harry Hellman
- Jean-Claude Brialy as Van Nijlen
- Mario Scaccia as Marino Cianciarelli
- Gianfranco Barra as Cantalamessa
- Giuseppe Anatrelli as Carru
- Serge Frédéric as Melzio
- Jean-Patrick Junoy as Alex
- Luigi Zerbinati as The 'Debosciato', nephew of Prince Dell'Orso

== Production ==
The film was adapted from Ugo Moretti's novel Doppia morte al Governo Vecchio. Roberto Infascelli produced the film, and his brother Paolo was credited with production organization.

The film was already being edited when Roberto died in a car accident in France in August 1977.
