= Omicron (film) =

1963 Italian science fiction-comedy film

- Directed by: Ugo Gregoretti
- Produced by: Franco Cristaldi
- Cinematography: Carlo Di Palma
- Music by: Piero Umiliani
- Release date: 1963
- Country: Italy
- Language: Italian

Omicron is a 1963 Italian science fiction-comedy film directed by Ugo Gregoretti. The plot concerns an alien who takes over the body of an Earthling (a deceased factory worker who is resurrected) in order to learn about The Planet Earth and threatens the human kind. The film was entered in the competition at the 24th Venice International Film Festival.

== Cast ==
- Renato Salvatori as Trabucco - Omicron
- Rosemary Dexter as Lucia
- Gaetano Quartararo as Midollo
- Mara Carisi as Mrs. Midollo
