= Freedom (band) =

British psychedelic rock band

Freedom was an English psychedelic rock band, active in the late 1960s and early 1970s, formed initially by ex-members of Procol Harum.

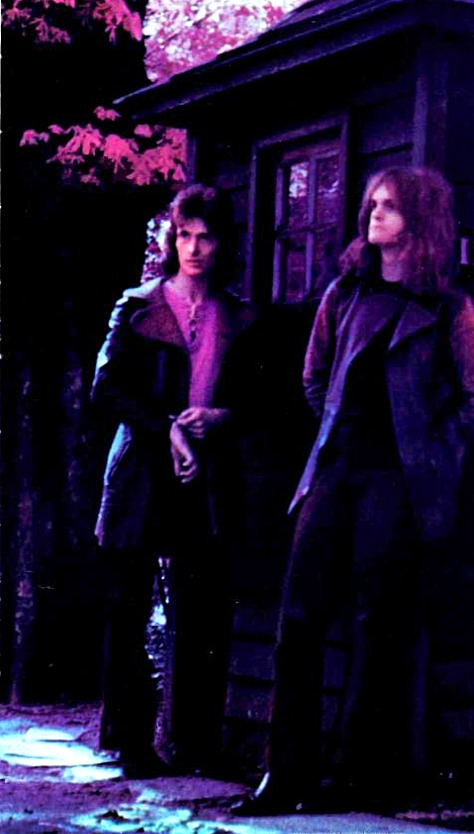
Freedom in the 30 October 1971 issue of Cash Box

Ray Royer and Bobby Harrison, who had performed on the hit Procol Harum single "A Whiter Shade of Pale" (Harrison had only played on the B-Side, "Lime Street Blues"), were kicked out of the Harum by vocalist Gary Brooker, and replaced by Robin Trower and Barry Wilson. Royer and Harrison then formed Freedom with 20 year-old vocalist/bassist Steve Shirley and keyboardist Tony Marsh, who was shortly replaced by Mike Lease, releasing two German singles and the soundtrack for the Tinto Brass/Dino de Laurentiis film Attraction (original title Nerosubianco, also known as Black on White).

In 1968, Royer, Shirley, and Lease departed the group, leading to Harrison bringing in guitarist Roger Saunders and bassist Walter Managham. This new line-up pursued more of a hard rock sound, and scored tour dates with Black Sabbath, Jethro Tull, and The James Gang. They achieved renown for their version of the Beatles song "Cry Baby Cry" on their second album Freedom at Last. Further line-up changes occurred before the band finally splintered in 1972, with Harrison going on to Snafu.

== Members ==
- Bobby Harrison – vocals, drums
- Ray Royer – guitar
- Steve Shirley – bass
- Tony Marsh – keyboards
- Mike Lease – keyboards
- Robin Lumsden – keyboards
- Roger Saunders – guitar
- Walt Monaghan – bass
- Peter Dennis – bass
- Steve Jolly – guitar

== Discography ==
- Black on White (Nero Su Bianco) (1969)
- Freedom at Last (BYG Actuel/ABC Records, 1970)
- Freedom (reissued by Angel Air Records, originally released 1970)
- Through the Years (Vertigo Records, 1971)
- Is More Than A Word (Vertigo Records, 1972)
