= Maurizio Liverani =

Italian film director (1928–2021)

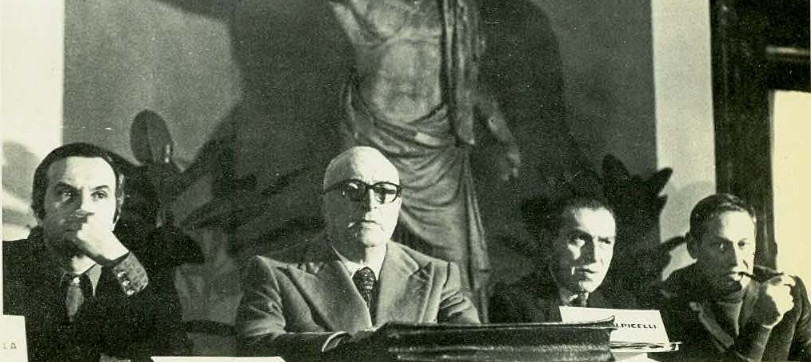
In the photo, from left, Maurizio Liverani, Luigi Volpicelli, the President of the Free Writers Union, the Honorable Dino Del Bo and the Secretary of the Union, Francesco Grisi.

Maurizio Liverani (27 November 1928 – 10 February 2021), also known as Mauro Lirani or even Ivanovich Koba, was an Italian journalist, filmmaker, and writer. He was born in Rovereto and died in Senigallia.

== Filmography ==
=== Director ===
- Sai cosa faceva Stalin alle donne? (1969)
- Il solco di pesca (1976)
- Se questa è follia... (1993), documentary
- La strategia del bianco (1994), documentary
- Ben Shahn: un tragico umorista (1995), documentary
- I colori di Sara (1997), documentary
- Gli eroi sono stanchi - I gessi di Enrico Mazzolani (1998), documentary

=== Screenwriter ===
- Sai cosa faceva Stalin alle donne? (1969)
- Il solco di pesca (1975)
- Se questa è follia... (1993), documentary
- La strategia del bianco (1994), documentary
- Ben Shahn: un tragico umorista (1995), documentary
- I colori di Sara (1997), documentary
- Gli eroi sono stanchi - I gessi di Enrico Mazzolani (1998), documentary
