= Silvan (illusionist) =

Italian magician (born 1937)

Silvan OMRI
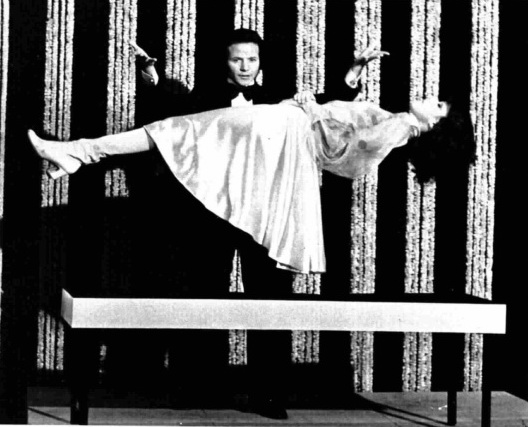
- Silvan makes Mita Medici levitate (Canzonissima, 1973)
- Born: Aldo Savoldello; 18 May 1937 (age 89); Venice, Kingdom of Italy
- Occupation: Illusionist
- Website: silvanmagic.com

Aldo Savoldello (born 18 May 1937), known professionally as Silvan, is an Italian illusionist, writer and television personality.

== Life and career ==
Born in Venice, Silvan started his career at 20 years old and made his television debut in 1956, in the RAI show Primo applauso (First Applause). He gained mainstream popularity in 1973 hosting the RAI Saturday night magic and illusionism show Sim Salabim. After six decades as a magician, Silvan continues to perform on television and touring his full evening show.

Silvan won two Merlin Awards, in 1998 and in 2011, being the first Italian magician to win the award. The Academy of Magical Arts awarded him "Magician of the Year" twice, in 1990 and in 1999. He is also in the "Hall of Fame" of the Society of American Magicians. In 2018, The Magic Circle awarded him The Devant for "Services to International Magic".

Silvan has written several books, appeared in some films (notably, as "The great Pacco", in Modesty Blaise,1966) and has collaborated with a number of publications. He is an honorary member of CICAP, a skeptic scientific organization.

He identifies as Roman Catholic.
