= Il solco di pesca =

- Directed by: Maurizio Liverani
- Written by: Maurizio Liverani
- Starring: Martine Brochard; Gloria Guida
- Music by: Teo Usuelli
- Release date: 1976
- Country: Italy
- Language: Italian

Il solco di pesca (translates in English to "The Furrow of the Peach" although often mis-translated as "Groove Fishing" or "Fishing Hole" due to the word "pesca" ("peach" in Italian) is "fishing" in Spanish)) is a 1976 Italian erotic-drama film directed by Maurizio Liverani. It concerns a photographer (Davide) obsessed with women's posteriors who, while carrying on an affair with the married Viviane finds her maid Tonina (played by Gloria Guida) to have a younger, more inspiring "peach." Davide consults his Uncle, a priest at the local church, which introduces casual discussions of Catholic guilt and the role of sin in the home to what might otherwise be a light sex comedy.

== Cast ==
- Martine Brochard as Viviane
- Gloria Guida as Tonina
- Alberto Terracina as Davide
- Diego Ghiglia as Husband of Viviane
- Emilio Cigoli as Uncle of Davide

== See also ==
- List of Italian films of 1976
