= Ugo Gregoretti =

Italian film director (1930–2019)

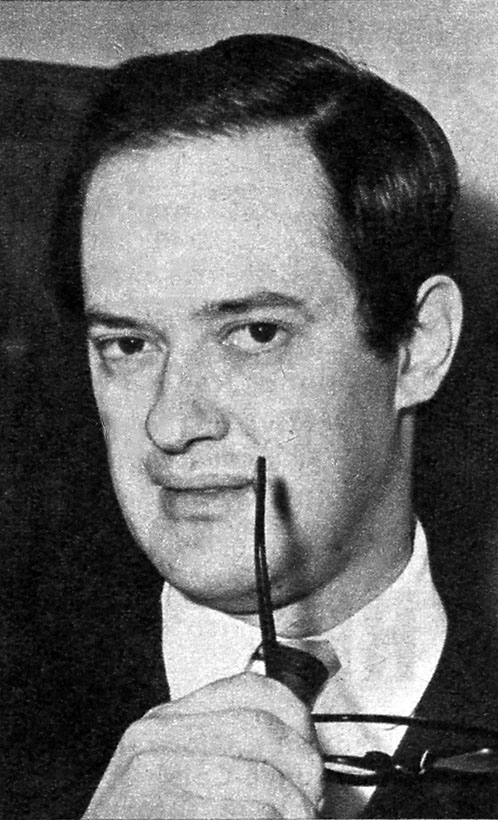
- Born: 28 September 1930; Rome, Italy
- Died: 5 July 2019 (aged 88); Rome, Italy
- Occupations: Film director Actor; Screenwriter
- Years active: 1956–2019

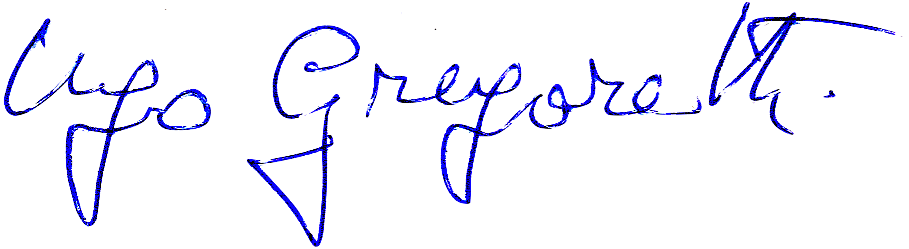
Ugo Gregoretti signature, 1995

Ugo Gregoretti (28 September 1930 – 5 July 2019) was an Italian film, television and stage director, actor, screenwriter, author and television host. He directed 20 films during his career.

== Biography ==
Born in Rome, Gregoretti entered RAI in 1953, working as a documentarist and a director. In 1960 he won the Premio Italia Award for tv documentary La Sicilia del Gattopardo. In 1962 he made his first movie: the comedy-drama I nuovi angeli. Since 1978 he started his activity on stage as director of prose and opera representations. His activity as director was mainly characterized by a sensitivity to the political and social issues combined to a peculiar use of irony and satire. He was president of Teatro Stabile di Torino, the Turin Permanent Theatre, 1980 thru 1989, and in 1995 he was appointed president of the Accademia Nazionale di Arte Drammatica Silvio D'Amico. In 2010 he was awarded with a special Lifetime Nastro d'Argento for his career.

== Filmography ==
- I nuovi angeli (1962)
- Ro.Go.Pa.G. (1963)
- Omicron (1963)
- Les plus belles escroqueries du monde (1964)
- Beautiful Families (1964)
- Apollon: una fabbrica occupata (1969)
- Contratto (1970)
- Antifascisti a Roma (1972)
- Vietnam, scene dal dopoguerra (1975)
- Oltre la guerra, ad Hanoi (1975)
- Dentro Roma (1976)
- La terrazza (only acting, 1980)
- Comunisti quotidiani (1980)
- Sabatoventiquattrimarzo (1984)
- It's Happening Tomorrow (only acting, 1988)
- Maggio musicale (1990)
- La primavera del 2002 - l’Italia protesta, l’Italia si ferma (2002)
- Scossa (2011)
- Io, il tubo e la pizza (unreleased, 2017)
