= Pets (TV series) =

British television series

Pets is an adult British puppet sitcom, produced by Fit2Fill Productions Limited. It was originally aired on Channel 4 and ran for two series, the first being broadcast in 2001, and the second in 2002. It was also sold to Fox in Australia, MTV in Italy, and the Middle East.

The series was created and written by Andrew Barclay and Brian West (pen name Brian Luff), who had previously worked together at the Edinburgh Festival, winning an award for an advert for The Jerry Springer Show, and on the sketch show We Know Where You Live.

A total of 26 episodes of Pets were aired, all approximately 11 minutes long. They were shown in the early hours of the morning, and as a result, the series was fairly unknown, although it did gain a significant cult following. There was a demand on the official website for Pets to be released on DVD. Eventually a limited edition DVD was made available to purchase via the official website. As well as the two series, the DVD included two unbroadcast episodes, a clip show named "The Trials Of Hamish", and a behind-the-scenes special named "The Making Of Pets".

Several episodes of Pets are currently available as a free podcast downloadable via iTunes.

== Subject matter ==
Pets focuses on the everyday lives of four anthropomorphic domestic animals and their dysfunctional interactions with each other. They live in a filthy, rundown house, although it has working electricity and running water. There is never a human owner visible or even mentioned.

The episodes are set entirely within the house and self-contained; events from previous episodes are never referred to, but unseen ones from the past often are. Most of the situations that take place tend to be surreal, contain strong elements of black comedy and off-colour humour, and frequently make references to pop culture subjects.

Pets also follows a rather traditional sitcom technique by using a "reset button". Each of the Pets have died at least once, only to reappear alive and well in the next episode.

== Characters ==
- Hamish, voiced by Ian Angus Wilkie, is a large Red Setter. He is well-spoken and the most intellectually-minded of the Pets, often seen reading books or newspapers. On the flipside, however, he is also frequently uptight, sarcastic, has a short temper, and longs to be in more intelligent, cultured, and dignified company than the rest of the Pets household.
- Trevor, voiced by Andrew Barclay, is a small, grey bulldog. He is foul-mouthed, irritable, extremely perverted and spends most of his time eating and masturbating. He has a large collection of hardcore pornography and is often seen humping items of furniture. He can be rather intelligent and eloquent at times, but does not take these traits seriously, being more content in engaging in other very crude activities, including drinking out of the toilet with a curly straw and smearing the walls with his own faeces. He speaks in a gruff Cockney accent. He has no sense of hygiene and has had the same two tapeworms in his stomach since the late 1970s. The worms, also voiced by Barclay and Luff, converse about a wide range of subjects, from ABBA to the Kennedy assassination.
- Davina, voiced by Sally Elsden, is a Persian blue cat. She is cynical, sardonic, has clinical depression and is addicted to her medication. She has a large collection of bloodstained plastic bags, all of which seem to contain some kind of furry animal. She puts these bags under the floorboards, or attempts to flush down the toilet. She has a boyfriend named Vince; an unseen tomcat who constantly travels alone over many parts of the world. However, he still sends her messages about his pursuits that often imply that he is cheating on her, which she bitterly discusses directly to the camera about, ultimately ending in her plotting twisted methods on how she will murder him when he returns.
- JP, voiced by Petros Emmanuel, is a parrot. He has no feathers, since losing to Trevor in a card game where he bet his entire plumage on a pair of fours. He also has two different coloured eyes and can not fly. He has a pet himself, a goldfish who has obviously been dead for a long time, although he does not acknowledge this, and continues to dote on it. He is extremely eccentric, perpetually cheerful and lives in a fantasy world of his own, often rambling on directly to the camera about subjects or individuals related to the episodes' themes. He speaks in an Afrikaans accent, and has a tendency to intersperse his dialogue with (occasionally irrelevant and obscene) phrases in the language. He also enjoys drinking his own urine, a fact which he states in almost every episode, and has an unreturned infatuation with Davina.

Iestyn Evans, Mark Mander, Garry Rutter, Mandy Travis and Martin Weinling performed the puppets in Pets, swapping characters scene-by-scene. The puppets were designed and built by Iestyn Evans and Andy Heath.

== Episode list ==
=== Series 1 (2001) ===
No.	Title
1	"Christmas"
Christmas can arrive at almost any time of year (if the programme scheduling is bad enough!), but even in the middle of March, Hamish still manages to burn the turkey.
2	"Pregnant"
Trevor tells a hungover Hamish that while drunk he has had sex with the cat. So, when it's discovered that the cat is pregnant, Hamish decides to do the decent thing.
3	"Pleasure"
Trevor drives everyone in the house around the bend when he gets an unbearable itch in the middle of his back and can't reach it.
4	"American Beauty"
Using Hamish's name, Trevor borrows thousands of pounds from a dangerous gangster and bets the lot on a horse called The Stumbler. When the horse fails to win, a terrified Hamish prepares for the worst.
5	"On Hold"
"You are held in a queue and will be answered shortly." But just how long can the residents of the Pets house really hang on before becoming violent?
6	"Consider Yourself"
Trevor assumes the guise of Sherlock Holmes in order to solve, once and for all, the mystery of Jack the Ripper, while Hamish discovers the delights of having sex with a Victorian washstand.
7	"The Miracle"
Whilst sitting in the downstairs toilet, Hamish has a vision of the Archangel Gabriel and decides to dedicate himself to God. In the meantime, Trevor tries to persuade the cat to dress up for him as a nun.
8	"Conspiracy Theory"
When Hamish sets out to uncover the truth behind the assassination of JFK. he learns more than he ever wanted to know about his house mates. Meanwhile, the parrot develops an almost unnatural interest in certain flavours of ice cream, and the worms in Trevor's stomach remember the 1960s.
9	"Constipation"
Hamish has been constipated for 14 months, so Trevor persuades him to try an extremely unorthodox cure. Meanwhile, JP asks the cat to go away with him for a dirty weekend in the country.
10	"Death"
The parrot discovers that he can "see dead people" when Trevor chokes on a fish bone and comes floating back from beyond the grave.
11	"Halloween"
JP the parrot manages to lay his hands on a smoke machine, and invites everyone to a big Halloween party. In the meantime, Hamish plans to freeze himself and wake up six hundred years in the future.
12	"Hostage"
Hamish holds the parrot to ransom, and Trevor's hostage-negotiating skills are tested to the limit.
13	"Money"
Trevor discovers a suitcase full of cash under the floorboards, and he and Hamish plan to kill the others and keep all the money for themselves.

=== Series 2 (2002) ===
No.	Title
14	"Drugs"
Trevor and the cat take LSD and become convinced they've been parachuted into the heart of the Vietnam war.
15	"Robot Wars"
The parrot sees a flying saucer landing in the back garden, and one by one the residents of the pets house turn into strange, zombie-like robots. Or do they?
16	"Presumed Very Guilty"
Trevor takes a seat on the bench, and JP is called to the bar as Hamish goes on trial for murder...
17	"Talent"
Much to the disgust of Hamish, Trevor enters for Stars In Their Eyes in the guise of screen legend of Marilyn Monroe.
18	"Star Gate"
The parrot comes face to face with an exact replica of himself, as our heroes travel into a parallel universe through a mysterious time portal in the airing cupboard.
19	"Manumission Impossible"
Trevor starts holding noisy raves every night in the kitchen, and Hamish becomes increasingly irritated that he is never invited. But Big Brother is watching.
20	"Possessed"
Objects start flying around in the Pets house, and Hamish is seen floating mysteriously above the kitchen table.
21	"Reincarnation"
Hamish dies, goes to heaven and is brought back to life by Trevor. To his horror he then discovers that when he was dead he was "reincarnated as Trevor". In the meantime, the parrot becomes convinced that in a previous life he was an international rock star.
22	"World War II In Colour"
When the parrot goes on guard duty, and Hamish goes in search of a German spy, war is declared in the pets house.
23	"Curse of the Mummy"
The parrot recites a passage from the Book of the Dead and manages to turn everyone in the Pets house into Egyptian mummies.
24	"Mexican"
Hamish becomes convinced that he has turned into a Mexican, so Trevor decides to try a little aversion therapy.
25	"Satan"
Trevor demonstrates his extensive knowledge of the Black Arts and plans to conjure Beezlebub in the living room. In the meantime, JP claims to have seen Satan buying a copy of the Daily Telegraph in WH Smiths.
26	"Business"
When Hamish is made head of a notorious Mafia family, he orders the parrot to kill Trevor. In the meantime, Hamish seems to be having more than a little trouble with his "arsegrapes".
