= Aldo Maccione =

Italian actor

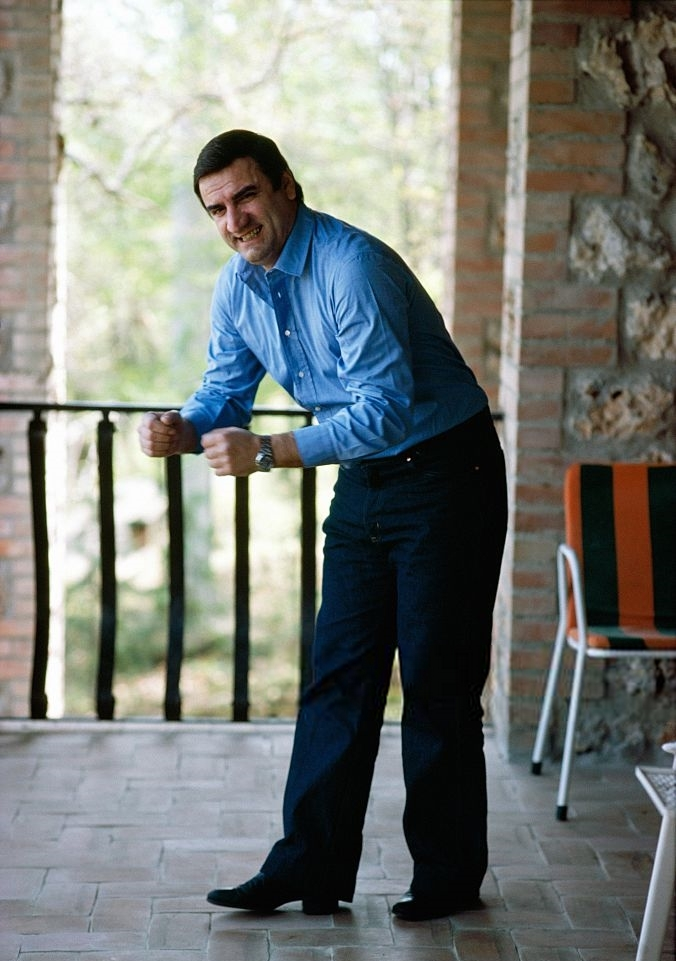
- Maccione in the 1970s, performing his distinctive walk
- Born: 27 November 1935 (age 90); Turin, Italy
- Occupations: Actor; Singer
- Years active: 1964–present
- Height: 1.78 m (5 ft 10 in)

Aldo Maccione (born 27 November 1935 in Turin) is an Italian film actor and singer, known for his comedic roles. He has appeared in more than 50 films since 1964. Maccione pursued his career in Italy, Spain and France, achieving success primarily in French films.

== Biography ==
=== Career ===
Maccione debuted as a cabaret performer, finding success in the late 1950s as a member of the Italian comedy music band I Brutos, which toured internationally. After leaving the group in the mid-1960s, he created the comedy music trio I Tontos, touring several European countries and notably spending six years performing in Barcelona, Spain. He later worked solo as a character actor. Maccione also performed alongside French singer Sacha Distel in the latter's tours; it was during this time that he gained the nickname "Aldo la classe" (Classy Aldo), which later stuck in France where it became attached to his screen persona.

As an actor, Maccione achieved his most significant success in France, where I Brutos had been popular. Director Claude Lelouch cast him in the crime film Le Voyou (1970) and later gave his first major film role, as a dim-witted criminal underling, in the highly successful comedy L'aventure, c'est l'aventure (1972). In 1973, Maccione appeared in another French box-office hit, the war comedy Now Where Did the 7th Company Get to?. However, he refused to appear in that film's equally successful sequels, in which he was replaced by Henri Guybet.

During the 1970s, Maccione divided his career between France and Italy; in his country of birth, he appeared alongside Sophia Loren and Marcello Mastroianni in the 1975 comedy Sex Pot, and later took part in the "sexy comedy" genre, opposite popular performers such as Renato Pozzetto and Edwige Fenech. However, he remained consistently more successful in France, where he eventually rose to leading roles; throughout the 1970s and 1980s, he starred in a series of French comedies where he was typecast as a stereotypical, foolish and mishap-prone Italian womanizer. In 1978, he co-starred with Pierre Richard in the successful French comedy Je suis timide mais je me soigne, directed by Richard; the two renewed their pairing in 1980 with C'est pas moi, c'est lui. Maccione's comic persona included a distinctive "seducer's walk" with a rolling, arched gait, that he performed as his characters attempted to woo ladies. He originally performed that walk in L'aventure, c'est l'aventure, later reproducing it in various films.

Maccione's successes at the French box office included Tais-toi quand tu parles (1981) and Plus beau que moi, tu meurs (1982), both directed by Philippe Clair, and Le Bourreau des cœurs (1983). While popular with French audiences, his starring vehicles were generally panned by critics, who considered them low comedy.

Maccione's box office appeal waned in France around the mid-1980s; he eventually scaled back his appearances, returning to character roles. Copyright issues later prevented some of Maccione's most popular films to be reissued on DVD and broadcast on television, causing him to be forgotten over time by French audiences. In 1994, following more than a decade of absence from Italian films, he played a supporting role in Carlo Verdone's Let's Not Keep in Touch. In 2002, he appeared alongside the Italian comedy trio Aldo, Giovanni e Giacomo in The Legend of Al, John and Jack. In 2005, he returned to French cinema with the film Travaux, in which he played a supporting role opposite Carole Bouquet.

In 2010, Maccione made a short-lived media comeback in France, taking part to the reality television game show La Ferme Célébrités; he withdrew from the show after a week, citing back pain and the difficult shooting conditions in Africa for a man his age. Eventually, he retired from show business and withdrew entirely from public life, even declining to collaborate to a 2015 French biographical book about him.

=== Personal life ===
Aldo Maccione has remained private about his personal life, though he has been reported by the French media to be the father of five children, with five different partners. He has retired in the French Riviera, living for several years in Saint-Paul-de-Vence.

== Selected filmography ==
- I magnifici Brutos del West (1964)
- La Grande maffia (1971)
- L'aventure, c'est l'aventure (1972)
- Now Where Did the 7th Company Get to? (1973)
- Ante Up (1974)
- Sex Pot (1975)
- Frankenstein - Italian Style (1975)
- Due cuori, una cappella (1975)
- Sex with a Smile II (1976)
- The Loves and Times of Scaramouche (1976)
- The Big Operator (1976)
- Carioca tigre (1976)
- Animal (1977)
- Taxi Girl (1977)
- The Virgo, the Taurus and the Capricorn (1977)
- Je suis timide mais je me soigne (1978)
- C'est pas moi, c'est lui (1980)
- I'm Photogenic (1980)
- A Policewoman in New York (1981)
- Tais-toi quand tu parles (1981)
- Prickly Pears (1981)
- Porca vacca (1982)
- Plus beau que moi, tu meurs (1982)
- Le Bourreau des cœurs (1983)
- Pizzaiolo et Mozzarel (1985)
- Let's Not Keep in Touch (1993)
- The Chambermaid on the Titanic (1997)
- I Fetentoni (1999)
- The Legend of Al, John and Jack (2002)
- Travaux, on sait quand ça commence... (2005)
