= That Malicious Age =

1975 film by Silvio Amadio

- Italian: Quella Età Maliziosa
- Directed by: Silvio Amadio
- Written by: Silvio Amadio; Piero Regnoli
- Produced by: Domizia Cinematografia
- Starring: Gloria Guida; Nino Castelnuovo; Anita Sanders
- Cinematography: Antonio Maccoppi
- Edited by: Silvio Amadio
- Music by: Roberto Pregadio
- Distributed by: HVW Focus (West Germany)
- Release dates: 11 March 1975 (Italy); 3 April 1981 (West Germany); 23 December 1981 (France)
- Running time: 87 minutes
- Country: Italy
- Language: Italian

That Malicious Age (Italian: Quella età maliziosa) is a 1975 Italian erotic drama film co-written and directed by Silvio Amadio. It features Nino Castelnuovo and Gloria Guida.

== Plot ==
Napoleone (Castelnuovo) is an artist bored of his married life and applies to work as a gardener at a summer mansion. On his way to Elba, he meets an attractive teenage girl (Guida) who attempts to seduce him and when he gets to the mansion, he learns that she is Paola, his employers' daughter living with her mother (Anita Sanders) and stepfather (Silvio Amadio). The mother is soon attracted to Napoleone but he has a growing affection for Paola, fuelled by her flirtatious behavior and his passion eventually turns into violence against a mentally disturbed fisherman (Mimmo Palmara) courting Paola.

== Cast ==
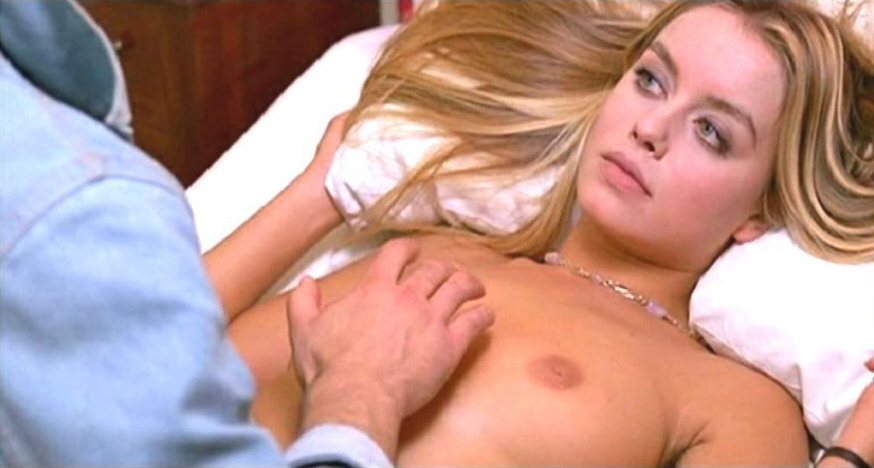
Guida as Paola in the film

- Gloria Guida as Paola
- Nino Castelnuovo as Napoleone
- Anita Sanders as Paola's mother
- Mimmo Palmara as Fisher
- Andrea Aureli as Adolfo, the writer
- Fabio Garriba

== Critical reception ==
The film was generally badly received by critics. Italian critic Paolo Mereghetti described the film as "unresolved", noting the ambitious efforts to combine melodramatic tension, psychological introspection and class morality but concluding that these aspirations ended up getting lost in long sequences of silences and panoramic views. The review of the website LongTake pointed out the unconvincing "awkward juxtaposition (rather than contamination) of genres" of the film, which starts as a commedia erotica abruptly turning to drama, and refers to the film as "uncertain, confused, approximate, annoyingly misogynistic".
