= Martine Brochard =

French actress and writer (1944–2025)

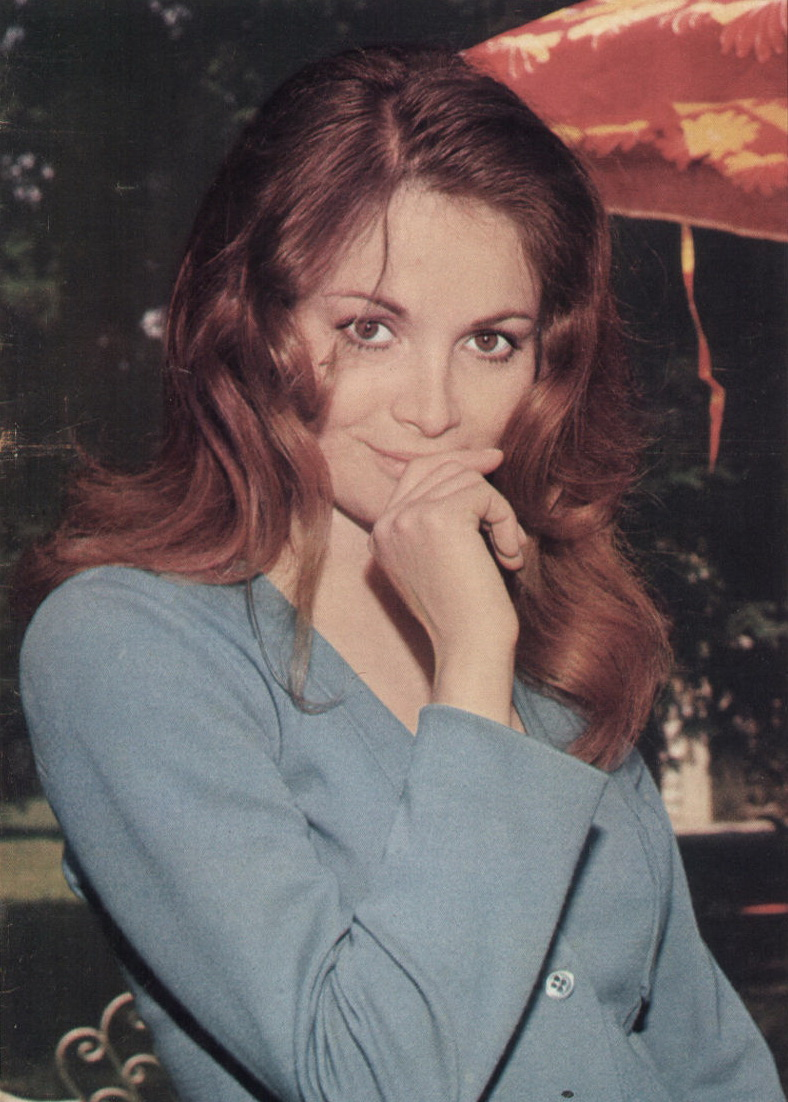
- Brochard in Radiocorriere magazine, 1970
- Born: 2 April 1944; Neuilly-sur-Seine, German-occupied France
- Died: 18 October 2025 (aged 81); Rome, Italy
- Occupations: Actress; Writer
- Years active: 1968–2025
- Spouses: Umberto Ceriani (m. 1970; div. 1985); Franco Molè (m. 1986)

Martine Brochard (2 April 1944 – 18 October 2025) was a French actress and writer.

== Early life and career ==
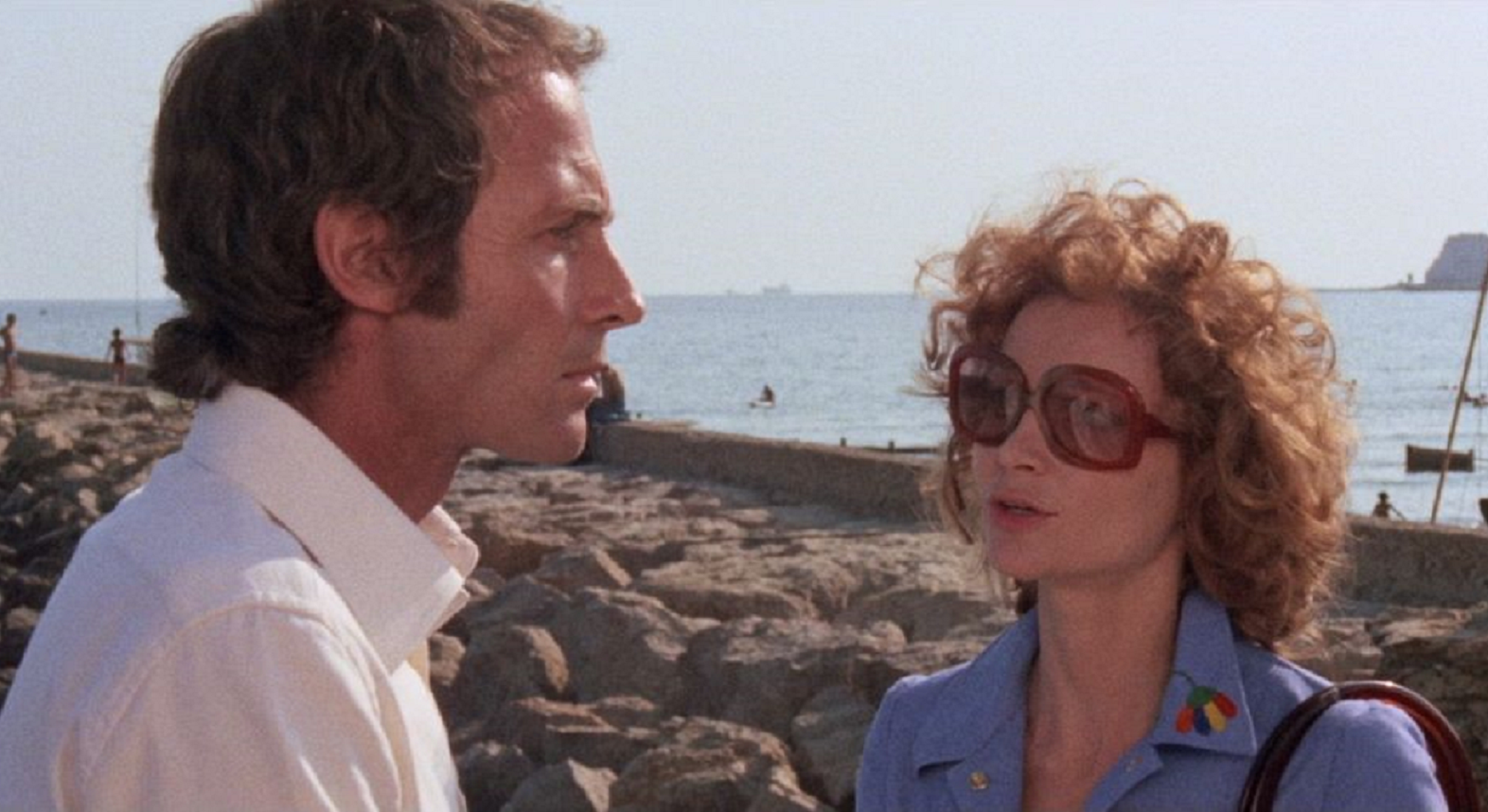
Brochard and John Richardson in a scene from Eyeball (1975)

Born on 2 April 1944 near Paris, Brochard debuted in 1968 in a minor role in François Truffaut's Baisers volés. In 1970, she moved to Italy, where she became a minor star in genre films, including poliziotteschi, commedia sexy all'italiana, and giallo films. From the mid 70's, she regularly appeared in Italian TV-series and on stage.

In 1995 and 1999, she released two collections of stories for children, La gallina blu e altri racconti (Mursia, ISBN 88-425-1927-8) and Zaffiretto il vampiretto e altri racconti (Mursia, ISBN 88-425-2496-4).

== Personal life and death ==
Brochard was married to the actor Umberto Ceriani with whom she had a son, Ferdinando Ceriani (born 1973), a theatre director. She then married Franco Molè (1939–2006) who was an actor, playwright, and director.

In 2003, Brochard was diagnosed with leukaemia, but later made a recovery.

Brochard died at her residence in Morlupo, on 18 October 2025, at the age of 81.

== Filmography ==
- Baisers volés (1968)
- La Main noire (1968)
- Béru et ces dames (1968)
- Le Socrate (1968)
- Les Cinq Dernières Minutes (1968) TV
- Le Survivant (1969) TV
- Eine Rose für Jane (1970) TV
- L'amour (1970)
- I giovedì della signora Giulia (1970) TV
- Trastevere (1971) (cut scenes)
- All'ultimo minuto (1971) TV
- Face aux Lancaster (1971) TV
- Armiamoci e partite! (1971)
- The Violent Professionals (1973)
- The Off-Road Girl (1973)
- The Nun and the Devil (1973)
- No, the Case Is Happily Resolved (1973)
- Story of a Cloistered Nun (1973)
- La nottata (1974)
- Il domestico (1974)
- Prigione di donne (1974)
- La governante (1974)
- Savage Three (1975)
- Il fidanzamento (1975)
- Eyeball (1975)
- Il solco di pesca (1975)
- A Woman at Her Window (1976)
- C'è una spia nel mio letto (1976)
- Quel movimento che mi piace tanto (1976)
- Frou-frou del tabarin (1976)
- Mazurka Di Fine Estate (1977) TV
- A Spiral of Mist (1977)
- Mannaja (1977)
- Stringimi forte papà (1977)
- Disonora il padre (1978) TV
- Bel-Ami (1979) TV
- Il medium (1980)
- L'ebreo fascista (1980)
- Murder Obsession (Follia omicida) (1980)
- Peccato originale (1981)
- Notturno con grida (1981)
- La sconosciuta (1982) TV
- Investigatori d'Italia (1985) TV
- L'attrazione (1987)
- My First Forty Years (1987)
- L'uomo che non voleva morire (1988) TV
- I ragazzi della 3ª C (1988) TV
- The Betrothed (1989) TV
- La stanza delle parole (1990)
- Le Gorille (1990) TV
- Paprika (1991)
- In camera mia (1992)
- Catherine Courage (1993) TV
- The Teddy Bear (1994)
- The Voyeur (1994)
- Lia, rispondi (1997)
- Non lasciamoci più (1999) TV
- La donna del delitto (2000)
- Vento di ponente (2002) TV
- Il bello delle donne (2002) TV
- Sfiorarsi (2006): Odette
- Il sangue e la rosa (2008) TV
- Caldo criminale (2010) TV
- Viso d'angelo (2011) TV
- Lightning Strike (2012)
