= Roberto Pregadio =

Italian composer and conductor (1928–2010)

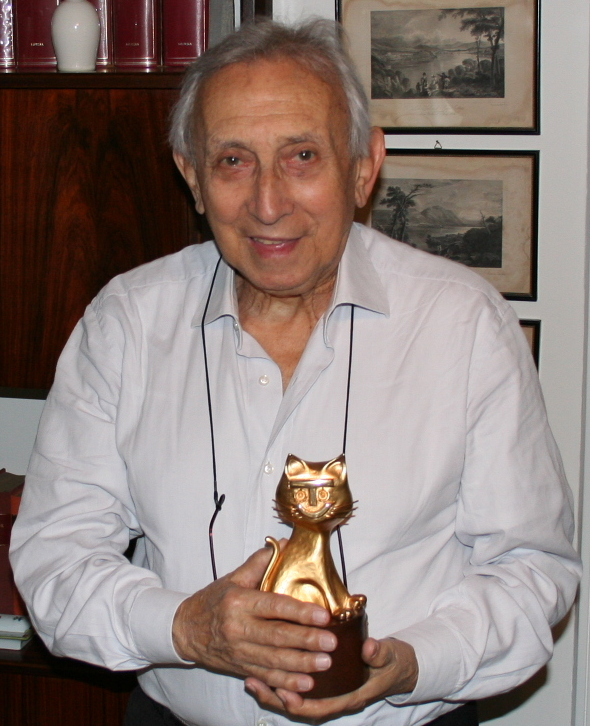
- Pregadio in 2008
- Born: 6 December 1928; Catania, Sicily, Kingdom of Italy
- Died: 15 November 2010 (aged 81); Rome, Lazio, Italy
- Occupations: Composer; conductor

Roberto Pregadio (6 December 1928 – 15 November 2010) was an Italian composer, conductor and television personality.

Born in Catania and graduated in piano at the San Pietro a Majella Conservatory of Naples, in 1960 Pregadio became a pianist in the RAI Light Music Orchestra. From the second half of the sixties, for about fifteen years, he composed and directed about fifty musical scores. In the 1980s he founded a jazz ensamble, the Sestetto Swing di Roma.

As composer he was probably best known for the whistled musical score for the 1969 spaghetti Western The Forgotten Pistolero, which he composed with Franco Micalizzi and which was later used in several episodes of The Ren & Stimpy Show.

In Italy he was also well known as the partner of Corrado Mantoni, from 1968 to 1997, and later of Gerry Scotti until 2007, in the radio and TV show La corrida.

== Selected filmography ==
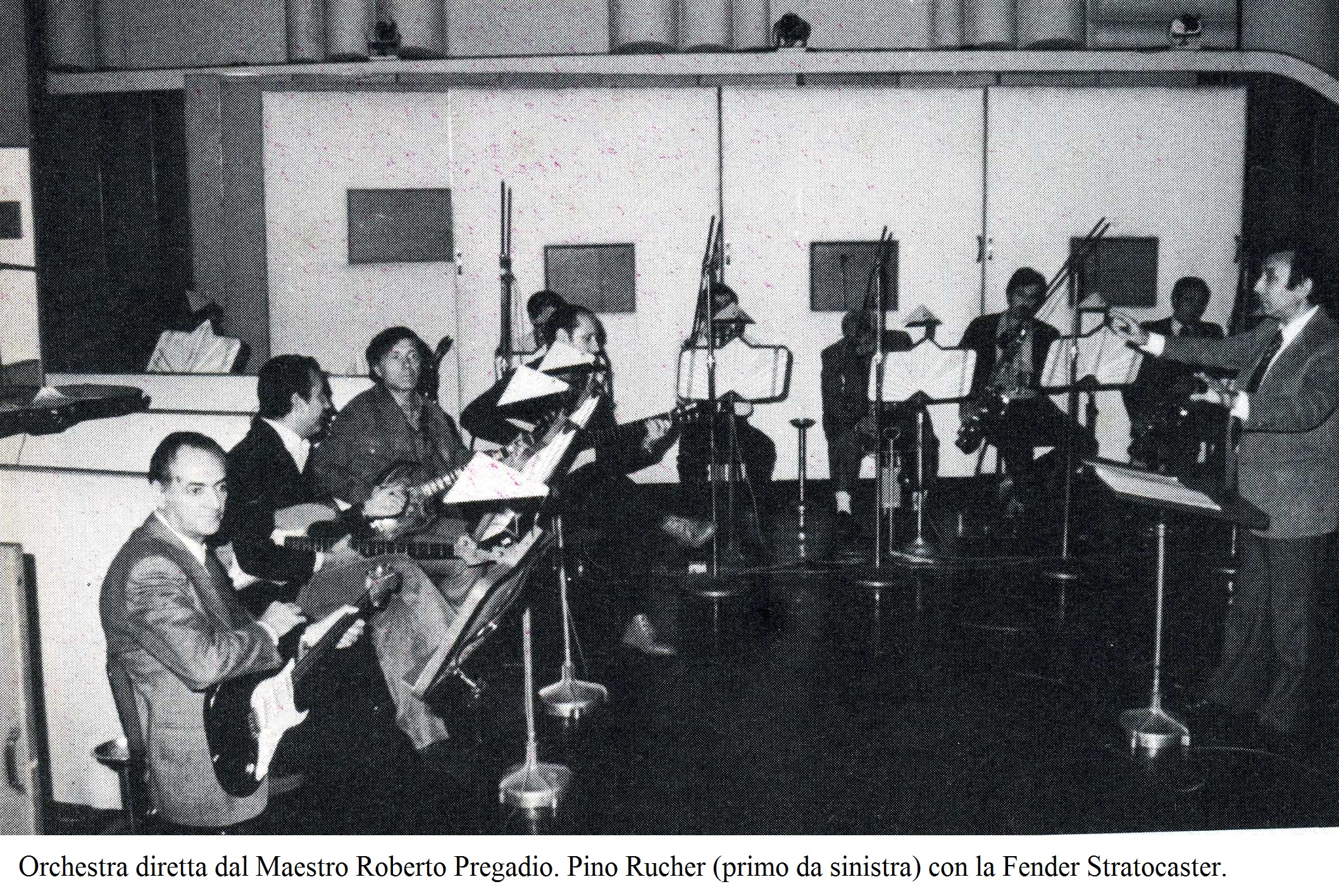
The RAI Orchestra directed by Maestro Pregadio

- Kriminal (1966)
- Our Men in Bagdad (1966)
- The Glass Sphinx (1967)
- The Last Killer (1967)
- A Hole in the Forehead (1968)
- Ciccio Forgives, I Don't (1968)
- King of Kong Island (1968)
- Brutti di notte (1968)
- Satanik (1968)
- The Forgotten Pistolero (1969)
- Franco, Ciccio e il pirata Barbanera (1969)
- Paths of War (1970)
- Erika (1971)
- Smile Before Death (1972)
- Death Carries a Cane (1973)
- Catene (1974)
- La minorenne (1974)
- So Young, So Lovely, So Vicious... (1975)
- That Malicious Age (1975)
- SS Experiment Camp (1976)
- Il medico... la studentessa (1976)
- Seagulls Fly Low (1978)
- The Last House on the Beach (1978)
- Mondo Cannibale (1980)
