= The Priest's Wife =

1971 film

- Film poster
- Directed by: Dino Risi
- Written by: Ruggero Maccari; Dino Risi; Bernardino Zapponi
- Produced by: Carlo Ponti
- Starring: Sophia Loren; Marcello Mastroianni
- Cinematography: Alfio Contini
- Edited by: Alberto Gallitti
- Music by: Armando Trovajoli
- Production companies: Compagnia Cinematografica Champion; Productions et Éditions Cinématographique Français; Les Films Concordia; PECF
- Distributed by: Warner Bros.
- Release date: 22 December 1970
- Running time: 103 minutes
- Countries: Italy; France
- Languages: English, Italian

The Priest's Wife (Italian: La moglie del prete) is a 1970 Italian-French comedy film directed by Dino Risi. The film was shot in English with an eye toward international release but in the Italian tradition it was overdubbed in the studio. The song "Anyone", sung by Loren, was released as a single.

== Cast ==
- Sophia Loren as Valeria Billi
- Marcello Mastroianni as Don Mario Carlesi
- Venantino Venantini as Maurizio
- Gino Cavalieri as Don Filippo
- Giuseppe Maffioli as Davide Librette
- Pippo Starnazza as Valeria's Father
- Miranda Campa as Valeria's Mother
- Dana Ghia as Lucia
