= Bollenti spiriti =

- Italian theatrical release poster
- Directed by: Giorgio Capitani
- Screenplay by: Franco Marotta; Laura Toscano
- Story by: Franco Marotta; Laura Toscano
- Starring: Johnny Dorelli
- Cinematography: Silvano Ippoliti
- Edited by: Sergio Montanari
- Music by: Piero Umiliani
- Production companies: Clesi Cinematografica; Italian International Film
- Distributed by: D.L.F.
- Release date: 30 December 1981 (Italy)
- Running time: 92 minutes
- Country: Italy

Bollenti spiriti is a 1981 Italian fantasy-comedy film directed by Giorgio Capitani.

== Cast ==
- Johnny Dorelli as Giovanni Guiscardo
- Gloria Guida as Marta
- Lia Tanzi as Nicole
- Alessandro Haber as Vittorio
- Lory Del Santo as Lilli
- Francesca Romana Coluzzi as Benzinaia
- Adriana Russo as the maid

== Release ==
Bollenti spiriti was distributed theatrically by D.L.F. on 30 December 1981.

== See also ==
- List of Italian films of 1981
