= Gloria Guida =

Italian actress, television presenter and former model (born 1955)

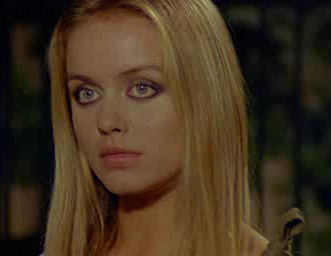
- Guida in La liceale (1975)
- Born: 19 November 1955 (age 70); Merano, Italy
- Occupations: Actress; Television presenter; Model; Singer
- Years active: 1972–present
- Spouse: Johnny Dorelli
- Children: 1

Gloria Guida (Italian pronunciation: [ˈɡlɔːrja ˈɡwiːda]; born 19 November 1955) is an Italian actress and television presenter, and model and singer. She became widely known during the 1970s for her performances in the Italian sexy comedy genre, particularly in films such as La liceale (1975), which established her as one of the genre's best-known performers. Her film appearances also included La minorenne (1974), La novizia (1975), That Malicious Age (1975) and Being Twenty (1978).

Before beginning her film career, Guida worked as a singer and model. She later expanded her career into television and theatre, appearing in stage productions and hosting several television programmes. Her television work has included Il mondo a 45 giri and Le ragazze.

== Early life ==
Gloria Guida was born on 19 November 1955 in Merano, Italy, into a family of Emilian origins. She moved with her family to the Bologna area during her childhood and grew up in Emilia-Romagna.

Her father worked as a barman and managed a venue on the Romagna coast. Guida's first public singing performance took place at the venue when she was 12 years old. She later recalled that her father encouraged her to perform despite her initial shyness. She also attended singing lessons in Bologna.

== Career ==
=== Music and modelling ===
Guida began her career as a singer during her teenage years. In 1972, she took part in the Italian music competition Un disco per l'estate with the song "L'uomo alla donna non può dire no", which was subsequently released as a single. The same year, she released another single, "Cuore, fatti onore".

In 1973, her record label submitted a song for consideration for the Sanremo Music Festival 1973, although it was not selected for the competition. As she began working in cinema, Guida gradually moved away from her recording career, occasionally performing songs for film soundtracks.

She also pursued modelling and was named Miss Teenage Italia in 1974.

=== Film career ===
Guida made her film debut in 1974 with La ragazzina, also released in English-language markets as Monika. The same year, she appeared in La minorenne, directed by Silvio Amadio. Both films featured young female protagonists and helped establish her screen career.

In 1975, Guida appeared in several productions, including La novizia, So Young, So Lovely, So Vicious..., That Malicious Age, Il gatto mammone and La liceale. The latter, directed by Michele Massimo Tarantini, became one of her best-known films and was particularly influential in establishing her association with the Italian sexy comedy genre.

Guida subsequently appeared in a number of comedies and dramas, often playing young women in stories involving relationships, family situations and social conventions. Her films from this period included Blue Jeans (1975), Scandalo in famiglia (1976), Ragazza alla pari (1976) and Il medico... la studentessa (1976).

In 1978, she starred alongside Lilli Carati in Being Twenty (Avere vent'anni), directed by Fernando Di Leo. The film became another notable title in her filmography. That year, she also appeared in The Bermuda Triangle and The Perfect Crime.

During the late 1970s and early 1980s, Guida continued to work in Italian comedy films. Her appearances included Night Nurse (1979), How to Seduce Your Teacher (1979), Fico d'India (1980), Bollenti spiriti (1981), La casa stregata (1982) and Sesso e volentieri (1982).

Her film career during this period made her closely associated with the popular Italian comedy cinema of the 1970s and early 1980s.

=== Theatre ===
Guida also worked in musical theatre. In 1979, she appeared alongside singer and actor Johnny Dorelli in the musical comedy Accendiamo la lampada, directed by Pietro Garinei. The production marked an important stage in her professional and personal relationship with Dorelli.

She subsequently continued to work in theatre, including appearances in productions alongside her husband. Her stage work represented a further development of her career beyond film and television.

=== Television career ===
Guida appeared in television productions during the 1970s and 1980s, including the variety programme Quantunque io (1977) and the television miniseries Festa di Capodanno (1988).

After a period with fewer acting appearances, she returned to television during the 2000s. She appeared in the comedy series Fratelli Benvenuti (2010) and took part in several entertainment programmes.

In 2015, she co-presented Il mondo a 45 giri on Rai 3. She later co-hosted the documentary interview programme Le ragazze on Rai 3 between 2018 and 2019, in which women from different generations discussed their lives and experiences.

Her other television appearances have included Domenica In, Io canto, Tale e quale show and Star in the Star. In 2023, she appeared in the television series Gigolò per caso.

=== Return to cinema ===
In 2022, Guida returned to feature films with Improvvisamente Natale, directed by Francesco Patierno. The film marked her return to cinema after an extended period in which she had concentrated mainly on television and other activities.

She subsequently appeared in the television series Gigolò per caso (2023).

== Personal life ==
Guida has been in a relationship with Italian singer and actor Johnny Dorelli since 1979. The two met while working together on the musical Accendiamo la lampada. They later married and have one daughter, Guendalina.

In interviews, Guida and Dorelli have discussed their long relationship and their shared professional experiences in theatre and entertainment.

Guida has publicly described herself as a Roman Catholic.

== Filmography ==
=== Film ===
Year	Title	Role
1974	La ragazzina (Monika)	Monica
1974	La minorenne	Valeria Sanna
1975	La novizia	Maria / Sister Immacolata
1975	So Young, So Lovely, So Vicious...	Angela Batrucchi
1975	La liceale	Loredana
1975	Il gatto mammone	Marietta
1975	That Malicious Age	Paola
1975	Il solco di pesca	Tonina
1975	Blue Jeans	Daniela "Blue Jeans" Anselmi
1976	Scandalo in famiglia	Elena
1976	Ragazza alla pari	Domenica Schlutzer
1976	Il medico... la studentessa	Claudia Raselli
1977	Maschio latino... cercasi	Gigia (segment "Stanotte o mai più")
1977	Orazi e Curiazi 3 - 2	Tarpeia
1978	The Bermuda Triangle	Michelle
1978	Being Twenty	Lia
1978	La liceale nella classe dei ripetenti	Angela
1978	The Perfect Crime	Polly
1978	Travolto dagli affetti familiari	Eliana
1979	Night Nurse	Angela Della Torre
1979	How to Seduce Your Teacher	Angela Mancinelli
1979	La liceale, il diavolo e l'acquasanta	Luna
1979	L'affittacamere	Giorgia Mainardi
1980	Fico d'India	Lia Millozzi
1981	Bollenti spiriti	Marta Sartori
1982	La casa stregata	Candida
1982	Sesso e volentieri	
2022	Improvvisamente Natale	

=== Television ===
Year	Title	Role / participation
1977	Quantunque io	Guest
1986	Se devi dire una bugia dilla grossa	Susanna Rolandi
1988	Festa di Capodanno	Cinzia
2008	Domenica In	Co-presenter
2009	Festival di Sanremo	Jury member
2010	Fratelli Benvenuti	Doris
2010–2011	Io canto	Jury member
2011	Lasciami cantare!	Contestant
2012	Tale e quale show	Contestant
2015	Il mondo a 45 giri	Co-presenter
2018–2019	Le ragazze	Co-presenter
2021	Before Pintus	Gloria
2021	Star in the Star	Contestant
2023	Gigolò per caso	Adele Andress

== Theatre ==
- Accendiamo la lampada (1979)
- Se devi dire una bugia dilla grossa (stage production; later adapted for television)

== Discography ==
=== Singles ===
Year	Title	Record label
1972	L'uomo alla donna non può dire no / Pioggia nell'anima	CBS (CBS-8015)
1972	Cuore, fatti onore / Pioggia nell'anima	CBS (CBS-8375)
1979	La musica è / Gloria around the clock	CAM (AMP-219)
