= Silvio Amadio =

Italian film director (1926–1995)

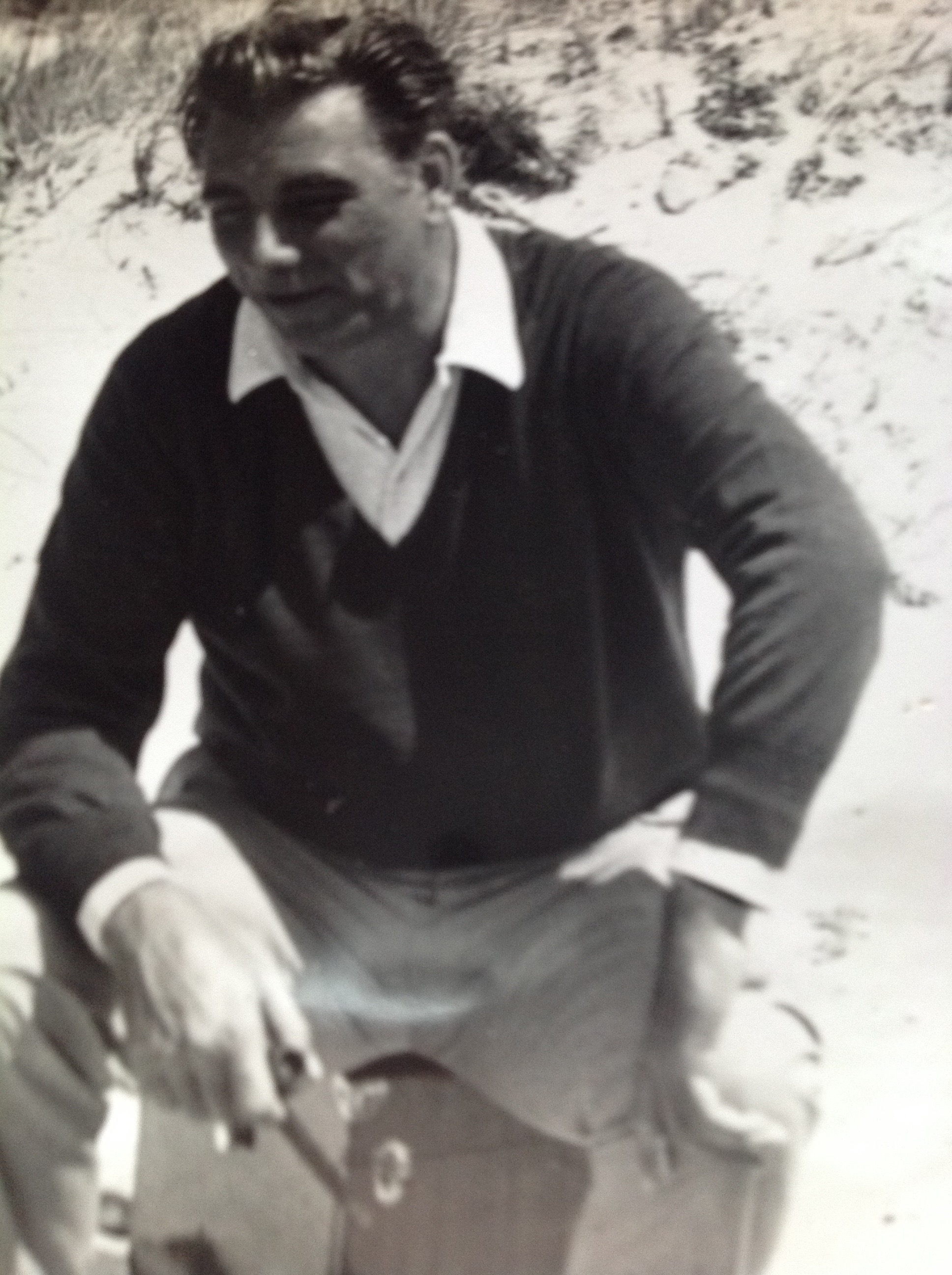
- Born: 8 August 1926; Frascati, Italy
- Died: 19 August 1995 (aged 69); Rome, Italy
- Occupations: Film director, screenwriter
- Years active: 1957–1981

Silvio Amadio (8 August 1926 – 19 August 1995) was an Italian film director and screenwriter. He directed 24 films between 1957 and 1981. His film Wolves of the Deep was entered into the 9th Berlin International Film Festival. He is known to horror film fans for directing Amuck! (1972), a giallo film starring Rosalba Neri and Barbara Bouchet, and to Commedia sexy all'italiana fans for directing some of the best Gloria Guida sex comedies of the mid 1970s.

== Selected filmography ==
- Wolves of the Deep (1959)
- Minotaur, the Wild Beast of Crete (1960) a.k.a. Theseus Against the Minotaur (a peplum starring Bob Mathias as Theseus)
- War Gods of Babylon (1962)
- Desideri d'estate (1964)
- Assassination in Rome (1965)
- For One Thousand Dollars Per Day (1966)
- Twisted Girls (1969) a.k.a. No Man's Island, a.k.a. Island of the Swedes (cameraman: Joe D'Amato)
- Smile Before Death - a.k.a. Smile of the Hyena, Rosalba Neri (1972)
- Amuck! (1972) a.k.a. In Pursuit of Pleasure, a.k.a. Maniac Mansion, starring Rosalba Neri and Barbara Bouchet
- La minorenne (1974)
- Catene (1974)
- That Malicious Age (1975)
- So Young, So Lovely, So Vicious... (1975)
- Il medium (1980)
- Il carabiniere (1981)
