= Emanuelle in Bangkok =

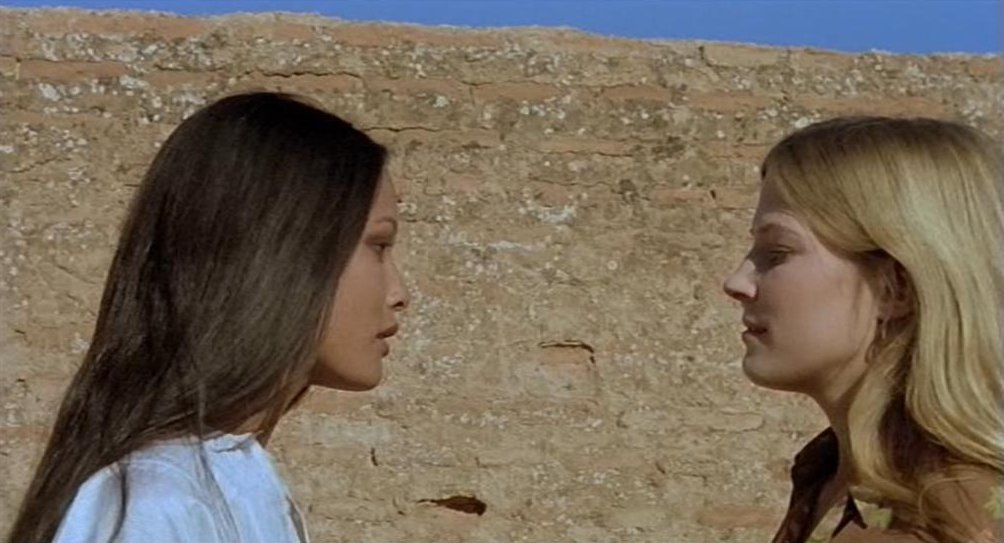
- Directed by: Joe D'Amato
- Written by: Ottavio Alessi; Maria Pia Fusco; Piero Vivarelli
- Starring: Laura Gemser; Ely Galleani; Gabriele Tinti; Ivan Rassimov; Venantino Venantini
- Cinematography: Joe D'Amato
- Edited by: Vincenzo Tomassi
- Music by: Nico Fidenco
- Release date: 1976
- Running time: 105 minutes
- Country: Italy
- Language: Italian

Emanuelle in Bangkok (Italian: Emanuelle nera - Orient Reportage, also known as Black Emanuelle 2 and Black Emanuelle Goes East) is an Italian sexploitation film from 1976 starring Laura Gemser and Gabriele Tinti and directed by Joe D'Amato. It is the second in a series of films featuring the investigative journalist Emanuelle.

Emanuelle in Bangkok is considered a genuine sequel to the 1975 film Black Emanuelle, which was not directed by D'Amato, but by Bitto Albertini, whereas Albertini's own Black Emanuelle 2 is a sequel only by name, with a different Emanuelle character played by a different actress.

== Plot ==
Photojournalist Emanuelle and her friend, archaeologist Roberto, travel to Bangkok, where she hopes to shoot photos of the Thai king for her New York magazine and interview him. She meets Prince Sanit, the king's brother, who shows her his country and introduces her to the secrets of ancient oriental massage. Emanuelle becomes friends with her masseuse Gee.

The two women and Roberto later meet the American couple Jimmy and Frances. Together, photographed by Emanuelle, they move through the exotic city and consume an opium pipe in the palace of the prince in the evening. The next day, Emanuelle watches an animal fight between a snake and a mongoose and later receives the news that Prince Sanit has arranged a meeting between her and the king's former first lover, who now lives in a mountain temple. Roberto meanwhile leaves for excavations in Casablanca.

When Emanuelle returns to the hotel, she finds her room ransacked. Camera, pictures and passport were stolen. Seeking help, she rushes to the palace of the Prince, where she is raped by a group of mercenaries in the service of the king. It turns out that Prince Sanit had tried to overthrow the king and is now in jail. Emanuelle is advised to leave the country because of her relationship with the prince. Without a passport, this is not possible at first, but she can seduce an official at the airport and get him to issue her a visa. There she also meets Frances again, who broke up with her husband. They fly together to Delhi, and Emanuelle continues alone from there to Casablanca.

Once there, she befriends Debra, the daughter of US Consul David, and tells them what has happened to her. Then she visits Roberto in the excavation camp and meets, to her surprise, Roberto's fiancé: his English colleague Janett. That does not stop her from joining them in their tent. The next morning, the three go on a tour of the desert, where their car breaks down and they meet a horde of mounted Tuareg nomads. The two women decide to ride with them rather than wait and leave Roberto alone. In the nomad camp, they dance for, and have sex with, the nomads.

Once again united with Roberto, Emanuelle gets back her camera from David in Casablanca, who had it retrieved from Bangkok. There follows a time when she is torn between her feelings for Roberto and Debra. Roberto, who hates lesbians, asks her decide between him and her, but Emanuelle remains undecided. They split up, and Robert leaves. When Emanuelle finally gets her passport again, she decides to fly to Paris on behalf of her magazine, leaving Debra alone, heartbroken.

== Cast ==
- Laura Gemser as Emanuelle
- Gabriele Tinti as Roberto
- Ely Galleani as Frances
- Ivan Rassimov as Prince Sanit
- Venantino Venantini as David
- Giacomo Rossi Stuart as Jimmy (credited as Giacomo Rossi-Stuart)
- Chris Avram as Thomas Quizet
- Koike Mahoco as Gee, Asian Masseuse
- Gaby Bourgois
- Debra Berger as Debra

== Production ==
In contrast to Albertini, the director of the first film, D'Amato integrates elements inspired by mondo filmmaking techniques into the series such as traditional cultural dancing, Thai boxing, cockfighting, and a mongoose and a snake fighting while trapped together in a glass tank, to give audiences more than just a sexploitation picture."

== Reception ==
Film critic Erik Sulev said "even Gemser and her illustrious co-stars such as Ivan Rassimov can't make this equally aimless and clueless sucker fly; of all the Black Emanuelle films, this is easily the worst of the bunch."

== See also ==
- Cinema of Italy
- List of Italian films of 1976
- List of LGBTQ-related films of 1976
