= War Devils =

- Film poster
- Directed by: Bitto Albertini
- Written by: Bitto Albertini; Valentín Fernández Tubau; Renato Infascelli
- Produced by: Jack Schwarz
- Starring: Guy Madison; Anthony Steel
- Cinematography: Jaime Deu Casas
- Edited by: Giacinto Solito
- Music by: Stelvio Cipriani
- Release date: 19 December 1969 (Italy)
- Running time: 99 minutes
- Countries: Italy; Spain
- Language: English

War Devils, also known in Italy as I Diavoli Della Guerra, is a 1969 war / action film written and directed by Bitto Albertini starring Guy Madison, Venantino Venantini, and Anthony Steel.

== Plot ==
The action begins in Tunisia 1943. An allied commando unit commanded by Captain George Vincent (Guy Madison) parachutes into the Tunisia desert to carry out a dangerous mission behind German lines. Captain Vincent and a German officer (Venantino Venantini) must help each other in order to make it across the desert to safety. After completing their trip, the German officer releases his American prisoner but pledges to kill him if they ever meet again.

One year later, the two officers find themselves facing each other again but this time in occupied France when Vincent and his US Rangers are sent to rescue a British officer, Colonel James Steele (Anthony Steel), an expert on secret arms and V2 rockets.

== Notes ==
The film was released in color and is rated PG. It was included in a compilation of classic war films titled Combat Classics: 50 Movie Megapack, distributed by Mill Creek Entertainment in 2008. It was filmed on location in Italy and Spain (set to resemble North Africa).
