= Black Emanuelle =

1975 film

- US film poster
- Directed by: Albert Thomas
- Written by: Bitto Albertini; Ambrogio Molteni
- Produced by: Mario Mariani
- Starring: Laura Gemser; Karin Schubert; Angelo Infanti; Isabelle Marchall; Gabriele Tinti; Venantino Venantini
- Cinematography: Carlo Carlini
- Edited by: Vincenzo Tomassi
- Music by: Nico Fidenco
- Production companies: San Nicola Produzione Cinematografica; Flaminia Produzioni Cinematografiche; Emaus Films
- Distributed by: Fida Cinematografica (Italy); Stirling Gold (US); Columbia-Warner Distributors (UK)
- Release date: 27 November 1975
- Running time: 94 minutes
- Countries: Italy; Spain
- Language: Italian

Black Emanuelle (Italian: Emanuelle nera) is a softcore sexploitation film from 1975 directed by Bitto Albertini. The film was set in Africa and shot mostly in Kenya. The music was composed by Nico Fidenco. Black Emanuelle was followed by a number of sequels, all revolving around the erotic adventures of Mae Jordan (played by Laura Gemser), a globe-trotting, hedonistic investigative journalist and photographer known to her readers as "Emanuelle". Her character has been described as "a strong and independent woman, sexually proactive, at the centre of wealthy young and old white men of power, and involved in any sort of depraved set and situation."

== Plot ==
Journalist and photographer Mae Jordan (Laura Gemser) publishes her work under the name Emanuelle. She accepts an assignment from a diplomatic couple in Nairobi, and starts a sexual relationship with both. Together they teach her the ways of the country and love.

== Cast ==
- Laura Gemser (credited as Emanuelle) as Mae "Emanuelle" Jordan
- Karin Schubert as Ann Danieli
- Angelo Infanti as Gianni Danieli
- Isabelle Marchall as Gloria Clifton
- Gabriele Tinti as Richard Clifton
- Don Powell as Professor Kamau
- Venantino Venantini as William Meredith

== Production ==
=== Casting ===
According to the account in his memoir, Albertini came across a picture of Gemser at a travel agency while he was shooting in Kenya. Struck by her beauty, he located her agent in Gand (Belgium). Upon travelling there and telling him that he wanted her to star in a film, the agent tried to dissuade him, pointing out that she could hardly pose for a photograph properly, let alone act. Albertini, however, insisted. In the meantime, the producer had called together Angelo Infanti, Karin Schubert, and Gabriele Tinti, and they started shooting in Kenya. After a few days, Gemser loosened up and began to act.

Albertini's account omits that Gemser had already appeared in two films: Amore libero - Free Love and Emmanuelle 2.

=== Title ===
Black Emanuelle was made to cash in on the success of the French film Emmanuelle with Sylvia Kristel, which was released the year before. Albertini claims it was he who omitted one m in the name of the lead character, in contrast to the French Emmanuelle character. It was deliberately omitted to avoid copyright claims.

=== Nico Fidenco's music ===
Kristopher Spencer calls Fidenco's scores to the Black Emanuelle films "by turns sultry and serious, fun and funky", and describes the instrumentation and sound typical of these soundtracks:

Fidenco works with a small combo led by keyboards and guitars, adding exotic percussion, woodwinds, brass and string in small doses. The sound is sophisticated, groovy and melodically memorable, with occasional Latin rhythms, unusual electronic textures and production nuances that show the influence of proto-techno wizards Giorgio Moroder and Kraftwerk.

== Release ==
One version of this otherwise softcore film contains brief hardcore pornographic inserts.

=== Box office ===
Director Albertini remembers that the film was a huge success. He states that this was also due to the "beautiful costumes" (Italian: bellissimi costumi) by Adriana Spadaro and to the soundtrack by Nico Fidenco, who Albertini had invited for the job. As Albertini remembers, the soundtrack record Black Emanuelle stayed in the hit parades for a long time.

== The Black Emanuelle series ==
By 1976 came two Black Emanuelle follow-ups, one in title (Black Emanuelle 2 by Albertini) and one in plot (Emanuelle in Bangkok, a.k.a. Black Emanuelle 2, by Joe D'Amato), also triggering four quasi-sequels from 1977 to 1978 by D'Amato (under the title Emanuelle) and two unofficial Emanuelle women in prison films by Bruno Mattei in 1982 and 1983.

=== Black Emanuelle films by Bitto Albertini ===
- Black Emanuelle (1975) (with Laura Gemser).
- Black Emanuelle 2 (a.k.a. The New Black Emanuelle) (1976) (with Shulamith Lasri).

Black Emanuelle 2 differs greatly in plot than the first film, featuring Israeli actress Shulamith Lasri as Emanuelle Richmond, a supermodel going through a state of amnesia and locked in a mental institution in New York. The lead actor, as in the first film, is Angelo Infanti.

Albertini's later movie, Il Mondo dei sensi di Emy Wong (1977, starring Chai Lee) was released as Emanuelle Gialla and Yellow Emanuelle in some markets.

=== Emanuelle films by Joe D'Amato ===
- Emanuelle in Bangkok (1976)
- Emanuelle in America (1977)
- Emanuelle Around the World (1977)
- Emanuelle and the Last Cannibals (1977)
- Emanuelle and the White Slave Trade (1978)

Emanuelle in Bangkok that stars Laura Gemser as the journalist lead character 'Emanuelle' of the first Black Emanuelle film has the original Italian title of Emanuelle nera - Orient Reportage and is considered a genuine sequel directed by Joe D'Amato. The later D'Amato sequels that all have the same lead character, but do not use the word nera (black) in their titles, are noted to feature scenes of extreme violence and depravity (one controversial scene in Emanuelle in America shows a nude woman manually stimulating a horse).

=== Emanuelle films by Bruno Mattei ===
- Violence in a Women's Prison (1982)
- Emanuelle Escapes from Hell (1983)

Four years after the release of the last Emanuelle film by D'Amato, a similar journalist character named 'Emanuelle' played by Laura Gemser was created by Bruno Mattei in two women in prison films: Violence in a Women's Prison where the real name of the character is given as Laura Kendall and Emanuelle Escapes from Hell (Emanuelle fuga dall'inferno a.k.a. Blade Violent - I violenti). Emanuelle Escapes from Hell was directed by Mattei and Claudio Fragasso under the collective pseudonym Gilbert Roussel. These films are not considered official films in the series, as they lack connective creative tissue to D'Amato's previous films in the series.

Uncut versions of several Emanuelle films contain scenes depicting actual penetration. Also Black Emanuelle and Emanuelle Around the World contain scenes where the Emanuelle character is seen having explicit sex. These scenes were created with hardcore inserts, using a body double. Laura Gemser never performed explicit sexual acts on film, nor was she informed that a body double would be used.

=== Other films ===
There are films that star Laura Gemser as a character other than Mae Jordan / Laura Kendall / 'Emanuelle' but that have, at one point or another, been promoted as Emanuelle films, especially in foreign releases. These films included even an earlier film that featured Gemser, Amore libero (1974), which saw a release with the English title "The Real Emanuelle". The name of Gemser's character had often been changed to Emanuelle in the English dubbing of such films.

- The Real Emanuelle (Amore Libero - Free Love, 1974), directed by Pier Ludovico Pavoni.
- Emmanuelle on Taboo Island (La Spiaggia del desiderio, 1976), directed by Enzo D'Ambrosio & Humberto Morales.
- Black Cobra Woman / Emmanuelle and the Deadly Black Cobra (Eva nera, 1976), directed by Joe D'Amato.
- Black Emanuelle, White Emanuelle / Emanuelle In Egypt (Velluto nero, 1976), directed by Brunello Rondi.
- Sister Emanuelle (Suor Emanuelle, 1977), directed by Giuseppe Vari.
- Porno Nights of the World (Notti porno nel mondo, 1977), directed by Bruno Mattei.
- Emanuelle & the Porno Nights (Emanuelle e le porno notti nel mondo n. 2, 1978), directed by Bruno Mattei.
- Emanuelle in the Country (Messo comunale praticamente spione, / L'Infermiera di campagna, 1982), directed by Mario Bianchi.
- Emanuelle's Daughter / Emanuelle's Sweet Revenge / Emanuelle: Queen Bitch / Emanuelle, Queen of Sados (I mavri Emmanouella, 1980), directed by Elia Milonakos.
- Divine Emanuelle: Love Cult (Die Todesgöttin des Liebescamps, 1981), directed by Christian Anders.
- Emanuelle: Queen of the Desert (La Belva dalle calda pelle, 1982), directed by Bruno Fontana.
- Emanuelle's Perverse Outburst (Le dechainement pervers de Manuela, 1983), directed by Joe D'Amato. Comprises archive footage from previous Emanuelle films.

Mario Pinzauti's 1976 film Emmanuelle bianca e nera ("White and Black Emmanuelle") was an attempt to capitalise on the success of both Black Emanuelle and Mandingo. The film, starring Malisa Longo (Emmanuelle) and Rita Manna (Judith) also saw theatrical release as Passion Plantation.

In July 2023, Severin Films released a 15-disc box set, The Sensual World of Black Emanuelle. It includes a total of 24 films; the two Bitto Albertini films, the five Joe D'Amato films, the two Bruno Mattei women-in-prison films, the two Porno Nights mondo films, Sister Emanuelle, Black Cobra, Black Velvet, Emanuelle's Perverse Outburst, Divine Emanuelle, Emanuelle: Queen of the Desert and Amore Libero - Free Love, along with:

- Porno Exotic Love (1980), directed by Joe D'Amato.
- Emanuelle - A Woman from a Hot Country (La mujer de la tierra caliente, 1978), directed by José María Forqué.
- Black Deep Throat (1977), directed by Guido Zurli and starring Ajita Wilson.
- Porno Nights of the World N.2 (1978), directed by Joe D'Amato and starring Ajita Wilson.
- Inferno Rosso: Joe D'Amato on the Road of Excess (2021), documentary by Manlio Gomarasca and Massimiliano Zanin.
- Scandalous Emanuelle (Voglia di guardare, 1986), directed by Joe D'Amato.
