= Maria Pia Fusco =

Italian screenwriter

Maria Pia Fusco (July 8, 1939 – December 13, 2016) was an Italian screenwriter and journalist.

From 1975 to 1978, she worked on the script for Tinto Brass's Saloon Kitty, the scripts for three of the five entries into the Black Emanuelle series directed by Joe D'Amato, and the script to Sturmtruppen, a film adaptation of the homonymous comic book series by Bonvi.

As journalist for La Repubblica, she reported on contemporary cinema and conducted interviews with many famous Italian and international directors and actors, including a 1998 behind-the-scenes reportage on Stanley Kubrick.

== Life and career ==
Fusco was born in Rome on July 8, 1939. Her father was a policeman.

As a sort of rebellion, Fusco went to London and, in 1972, began her career in film co-scripting Bluebeard - the first of a number of initially mostly erotic films that she wrote or co-wrote.

In the meantime, Fusco started working as journalist for La Repubblica, which had only been founded recently. For at least three decades, she followed the film festivals of Cannes, Venice, Berlin, London, Marrakesh and others, conducting interviews with Italian directors including Federico Fellini, Pietro Germi, Ermanno Olmi, Giuseppe Bertolucci and Nanni Moretti, as well as younger filmmakers - many of whom her friends - and international stars such as Sean Connery and Roman Polanski. With the latter, she was to work on a script shortly before the incident in which Sharon Tate was murdered.

Through her friendship with Ken Adam, Fusco also managed to enter Stanley Kubrick's mansion to report behind the scenes in an article published on July 23, 1998. According to Anna Bandettini, it was her masterpiece, representing her way of reporting on cinema not in an abstract way, but on its stories and lives.

Fusco died in Rome on December 13, 2016, after a short and devastating illness. She was buried at the Cimitero acattolico.

== Filmography as scriptwriter ==
- Bluebeard (co-writer) (1972) directed by Edward Dmytryk
- Daniele e Maria, una storia d'amore (1973) directed by Ennio De Concini
- Hitler: The Last Ten Days (1973) directed by Ennio De Concini
- Folies bourgeoises (adaptation of the novel) (1976) directed by Claude Chabrol
- Saloon Kitty (1976) directed by Tinto Brass
- Emanuelle in Bangkok (1976) directed by Joe D'Amato
- Emanuelle in America (1977) directed by Joe D'Amato
- Emanuelle Around the World (1977) directed by Joe D'Amato
- Il maestro di violino (1976) directed by Giovanni Fago
- Sturmtruppen (1976) directed by Salvatore Samperi

== Bibliography ==
- Bandettini, Anna (14 December 2016). "Morta Maria Pia Fusco, una vita di passione per il cinema". Repubblica.it (in Italian).
- Lentz III, Harris M. (2017). Obituaries in the Performing Arts, 2016. McFarland. ISBN 9781476670317.
