= Lady Dynamite (film) =

1973 film

- Directed by: Giuseppe Vari
- Written by: Aldo Crudo; Gastone Ramazzotti; Giuseppe Vari
- Starring: Lydia Alfonsi; Venantino Venantini; Anthony Steffen
- Cinematography: Carlo Cerchio
- Edited by: Manlio Camastro
- Music by: Mario Bertolazzi
- Release date: 1973
- Country: Italy
- Language: Italian

Lady Dynamite (Italian: La padrina, lit. 'The Godmother') is a 1973 mafia film co-written and directed by Giuseppe Vari under the pseudonym Al Pisani.

== Cast ==
- Lydia Alfonsi as Costanza Cavallo
- Venantino Venantini as Tommaso Russo
- Anthony Steffen as Nico Barresi
- Mario Danieli as Saro Giarratana
- Umberto Raho as Vito Spezzino
- Orchidea De Santis as Marisa
- Maurice Poli as Tony Cavallo
- Renzo Rinaldi as Salvatore Catanese
- Carlo Gaddi as Tommaso's Man
- Luigi Antonio Guerra
- Manfred Freyberger as Nino
- Robert Hundar as Tall Mobster
- Giangiacomo Elia as Raf

== Production ==
The film was shot between Syracuse, Sicily and the Elios studios in Rome. During production, lead actress Lydia Alfonsi was seriously injured while performing a stunt.

== Release ==
The film was released in Italian cinemas on 23 March 1973.

== Reception ==
Film historian Roberto Curti noted how the film, attempting to outdo the level of violence shown in The Godfather, "often borders on the grotesque", and described it as having a "vaguely feminist flair" and a "very poor script and direction". Paolo Mereghetti also panned the film, describing it as just "a mediocre festival of killings and acts of brutality".
