= Karin Schubert =

German actress (born 1944)

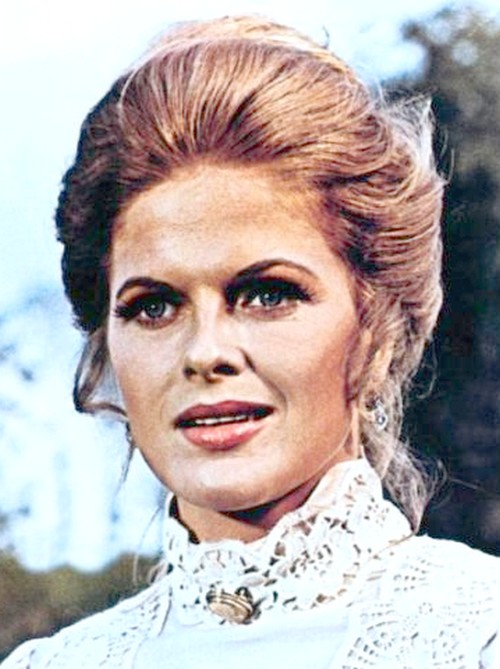
- Schubert in The Three Musketeers of the West (1973)
- Born: 26 November 1944 (age 81); Hamburg, Nazi Germany
- Other names: Karin Shubert; Karen Schubert; Karyn Schubert
- Occupations: Actress; pornographic actress
- Years active: 1967–1994
- Height: 5 ft 7 in (1.70 m)

Karin Schubert (born 26 November 1944) is a German actress. She appeared in film roles since 1970 and became a pornographic actress in the 1980s.

== Cinema career ==
Schubert's early roles included the Spaghetti Western Compañeros (1970) and Gérard Oury's film La folie des grandeurs (1971). In 1972, she appeared in the films Bluebeard, directed by Edward Dmytryk, and Yves Boisset's L'Attentat. The same year, she appeared along with Edwige Fenech and Pippo Franco in the sex comedy Ubalda, All Naked and Warm. She then started to appear in adventure films, especially with Italian actor George Eastman. The first film of this kind was a Three Musketeers Spaghetti Western adaptation, Tutti per uno...botte per tutti (Three Musketeers of the West) in 1973, and she also appeared in the crime drama Rudeness (1975), and as a Russian agent in the spy film Missile X: The Neutron Bomb Incident (1978) opposite Peter Graves and Curd Jürgens. In 1975 she appeared in the hit film Black Emanuelle starring Laura Gemser which drew the attention of director Joe d'Amato, and began to take part in his erotic films, including Emanuelle Around the World in 1977 where she played Cora Norman, the counterpart of Gemser.

Gradually losing demand as an actress in the mid-1980s, she moved to Spain, but also failed to establish herself there. Her personal problems also contributed to her career problems: her marriage broke down, and her son became addicted to drugs, becoming so out of control that his mother became the target of his violent outbursts. To earn money for his treatment, Schubert started posing for pornographic magazines, but when the money from this ran out, in 1985 at the age of 40, she also began starring in hardcore pornography films. Using her notoriety as leverage, she signed a contract with a film company that paid her an annual salary of 180,000 German marks, to perform in films mostly in Italy and West Germany.

In 1994, aged 50, Schubert left pornography, having featured in 24 films of this genre. That same year she tried to commit suicide by taking barbiturates with vodka, but was rescued by neighbours. Two years later, neighbours found her unresponsive in her car, having attempted suicide a second time by carbon monoxide poisoning.

== Selected filmography ==
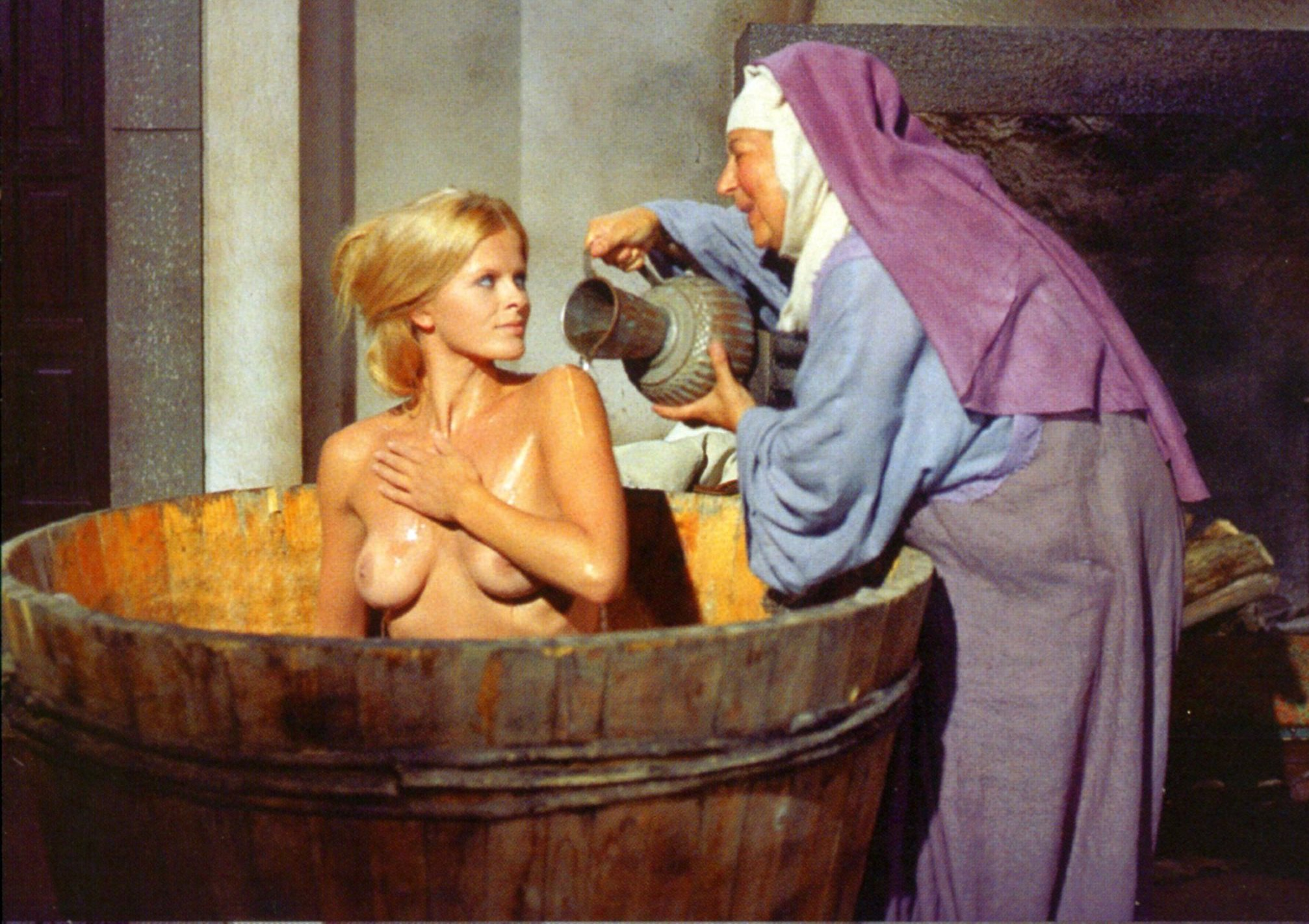
Schubert in Ubalda, All Naked and Warm (1972)

- A Sword for Brando (1970)
- Compañeros (1970)
- La folie des grandeurs (1971)
- Bluebeard (1972)
- L'Attentat (1972)
- Ubalda, All Naked and Warm (1972)
- Master of Love (1972)
- The Three Musketeers of the West (1973)
- La Punition (1973)
- The Girl in Room 2A (1974)
- Till Marriage Do Us Part (1974)
- Black Emanuelle (1975)
- One Man Against the Organization (1975)
- La dottoressa sotto il lenzuolo (1976)
- Emanuelle Around the World (1977)
- Missile X: The Neutron Bomb Incident (1978)
- Black Venus (1983)
- The Nurse in the Military Madhouse (1979)
- The Panther Squad (1984)
- Christina (1984)
- Hanna D. - The Girl from Vondel Park (1984)
