= Evi Marandi =

Greek-born Italian actress (born 1941)

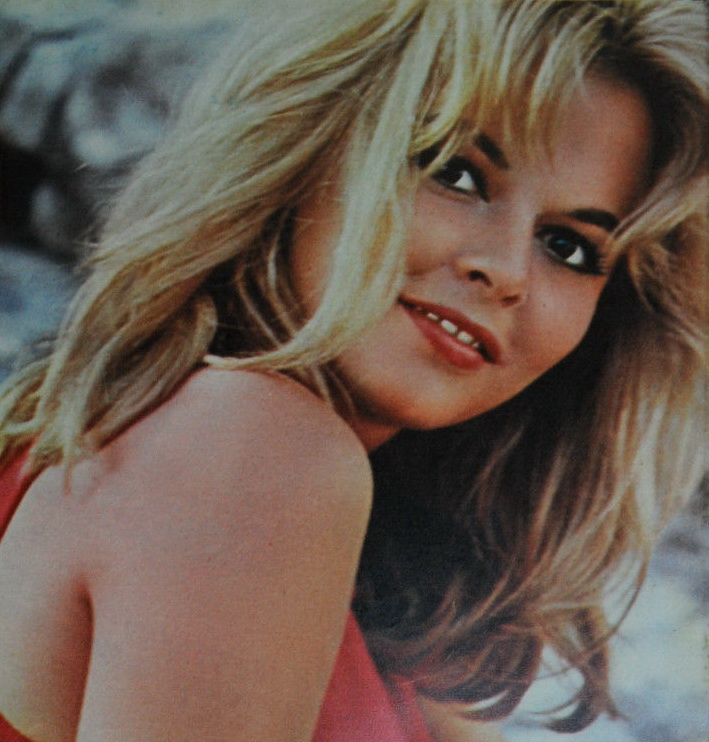
- Born: Εύη Μαράντη; 7 August 1941 (age 84); Athens, Hellenic State
- Occupation: Actress

Evi Marandi, (Εύη Μαράντη, born 7 August 1941) is a naturalized-Italian actress born in Greece, active from 1959 until 1974.

== Life and career ==
Marandi was born in Athens, the daughter of a banker. After studying acting at Actors Studio in New York, Marandi moved to Italy in 1961, where she became a star of B movies and genre films. Marandi has been credited with many aliases, including Evy Harandis, Evy Marandys, and Evi Morandi.

== Selected filmography ==
- Revenge of the Barbarians (1960)
- Totòtruffa 62 (1961)
- Leoni al sole (1961)
- Paris When It Sizzles (1964)
- Planet of the Vampires (1965)
- Agent 077: From the Orient with Fury (1965)
- I figli del leopardo (1965)
- James Tont operazione U.N.O. (1965)
- Three Dollars of Lead (1965)
- Agent 3S3: Massacre in the Sun (1966)
- Our Men in Bagdad (1966)
- The Tough One (1966)
- Goldface, the Fantastic Superman (1967)
- Man of the Year (1971)
- The Silkworm (1973)

== Television ==
- Ironside (TV Series) Episode entitled "The Monster of Comus Towers" (1967)
