= Scent of a Woman (1974 film) =

1974 Italian comedy film

- Poster for U.S. release
- Directed by: Dino Risi
- Screenplay by: Ruggero Maccari; Dino Risi
- Based on: Il buio e il miele by Giovanni Arpino
- Produced by: Pio Angeletti; Adriano De Micheli
- Starring: Vittorio Gassman; Alessandro Momo; Agostina Belli
- Cinematography: Claudio Cirillo
- Music by: Armando Trovajoli
- Release date: 20 December 1974
- Running time: 103 minutes
- Country: Italy
- Language: Italian

Scent of a Woman (Italian: Profumo di donna) is a 1974 commedia all'italiana film directed by Dino Risi, based on Il buio e il miele, a story by Giovanni Arpino. Both Risi and the leading actor Vittorio Gassman won important Italian and French awards.

An American remake, Scent of a Woman, was released in 1992.

== Plot ==
A blind Italian Captain (Fausto Consolo), accompanied by his young aide Ciccio (Giovanni Bertazzi), who has been assigned to him by the army, is on his way from Turin to Naples to meet with an old comrade. He was disfigured in the same military incident that blinded the captain. Unknown to his aide, the Captain means to fulfill a suicide pact with his old comrade.

While they journey, the Captain asks Ciccio to help him spot beautiful women. Unsatisfied with the boy's descriptions, he uses his nose instead, claiming that he can smell a beautiful woman. During their journey, he carries with him a picture of his beloved Sara, whom he could not bear to see, viewing himself as disfigured and helpless. The suicide pact is thwarted once Sara enters the picture, and Ciccio does some much-needed growing up.

== Cast ==
- Vittorio Gassman: Fausto Consolo
- Alessandro Momo: Giovanni Bertazzi
- Agostina Belli: Sara
- Moira Orfei: Mirka
- Torindo Bernardi: Vincenzo
- Alvaro Vitali: Vittorio

== Awards and nominations ==
- Profumo di donna was nominated for two Academy Awards in 1976 as Best Foreign Film and as Best Writing, Screenplay Adapted From Other Material.
- David di Donatello, Best Actor (Vittorio Gassman), 1975
- David di Donatello, Best Director (Dino Risi), 1975
- Nastro d'Argento, Best Actor (Vittorio Gassman), 1975
- 1975 Cannes Film Festival, Best Actor (Vittorio Gassman)
- César Award for Best Foreign Film, 1976

== See also ==
- List of submissions to the 48th Academy Awards for Best Foreign Language Film
- List of Italian submissions for the Academy Award for Best International Feature Film
