= Rendezvous with Dishonour =

1970 film

- Directed by: Adriano Bolzoni
- Written by: Adriano Bolzoni; William Gage; Günther Heller; Borislav Mihajlovic-Mihiz
- Produced by: Luigi Malerba; Alfredo Nicolai
- Starring: Michael Craig; George Sanders
- Cinematography: Guglielmo Garroni
- Edited by: Franca Silvi
- Music by: Gianni Ferrio
- Release date: 6 August 1970
- Running time: 100 minutes
- Countries: Italy; West Germany; Yugoslavia
- Languages: Italian; English

Rendezvous with Dishonour (Italian: Appuntamento col disonore, German: Spezialkommando Wildgänse) is a 1970 drama film directed by Adriano Bolzoni and starring Michael Craig.

== Cast ==
- Michael Craig as Colonel Stephen Mallory
- Eva Renzi as Helena
- Adolfo Celi as Hermes
- Klaus Kinski as Evagoras
- George Sanders as General Downes
- Margaret Lee as Nikki
- Ennio Balbo as Chief of Turkish Police
- Giacomo Rossi-Stuart as Lt. Tibbitt
- Giuseppe Addobbati as Pappyanakis
- Mario Novelli as Yani
- Luciano Pigozzi as Mr. Anton
- Alessandro Momo as Alexander
- Rista Djordjevic as Priest
- John Stacy as Colonel Webb (as John Stacey)
- Silvia Faver as Molly
- Rachael Griffiths as Sylvia

== See also ==
- The High Bright Sun (1964)
