= Goldface, the Fantastic Superman =

- Directed by: Bitto Albertini
- Screenplay by: Bitto Albertini; Italo Fasan; Ambrogio Molteni
- Story by: Bitto Albertini; Italo Fasan; Ambrogio Molteni
- Starring: Espartaco Santoni; Evi Marandi
- Cinematography: Carlo Fiore
- Edited by: Bruno Mattei
- Music by: Franco Pisano
- Production companies: Cineproduzioni Associate; Balcazar Producciones Cinematograficas
- Release dates: 1967 (Italy); 18 September 1971 (Spain)
- Running time: 100 minutes
- Countries: Italy; Spain; Venezuela

Goldface, the Fantastic Superman (Italian: Goldface, Il fantastico superman) is a 1967 superhero film directed by Bitto Albertini. The film is an international co-production between Italy, Spain and Venezuela.

== Plot ==
During businessman Matthews's party his industrial property was attacked and destroyed by terrorists of the megalomaniac, The Cobra. Meanwhile, there was a wrestling match in which famous wrestler, Goldface, participated and won. A German reporter trying to get an interview with him, has only found out that nobody knows the man under the mask. In reality, Goldface is Dr. Vilar, a scientist at the laboratory of millionaire Perera; and a womanizer.

The Cobra demands $2 million from Perera in exchange for protection of his factories. Company heads assign Dr. Vilar to deliver the money to the extortionists. He arrives at the meeting place, where Cobra's agent, Number 2, takes the suitcase with the money. After the deal, Dr. Vilar chases Cobra's men to a hotel. He changes to Goldface, attacks the terrorists, and recovers the money. The Cobra learns the money was returned to their owner and creates a new scheme.

The Cobra wants to kill Perera's daughter, Pamela. Pamela takes part in a motorcycle race. Cobra's assassin, though, sabotaged her motorcycle. However, Goldface saves the girl. A second attempt is made when Pamela and her friend, Olga, are at a beach. Assassins attack the girls during waterskiing. Goldface uses a borrowed radio-controlled toy plane with explosives and destroys the killers' boat. The Cobra is disgruntled by the failure of the assassins. Because of their failure, and because they've seen his face, Cobra kills the assassins. The Cobra is Matthews, and he plans to use the destruction of his property to obtain the insurance and rebuild.

Matthews and promoter arrange a wrestling match with an impostor Goldface in order to lure the real one. The Impostor loses the fight; and the real Goldface arrives. He and his assistant, Kotar, search for clues, and are unsuccessfully ambushed by Cobra's men. Goldface tells police Captain Claridge that he suspects Perera's administrator, Gunner, as being Cobra's inside man. The Wrestler intimidates Gunner and pursues him to Cobra's secret base.

The Cobra has Pamela kidnapped and demands $4 million ransom. Goldface and Kotar penetrate the base. Gunner is killed by Matthews. Goldface saves Pamela and signals the police to storm the base. Matthews kills Number 2 and escapes on a helicopter. Goldface chases him. The police shoot down Cobra's helicopter. And Goldface is back on a ring.

== Cast ==
- Espartaco Santoni as Doctor Vilar/Goldface
- Evi Marandi as Olga
- Micaela Pignatelli as Pamela
- Attilio Severini as Pamela's Assassin

== Production ==
According to director Adalberto Albertini, Goldface, the Fantastic Superman was offered to him by Giuseppe Maggi, the head of the distribution company Filmar. Albertini wrote in his autobiography that Maggi had his employees, drivers and friends to a screening of Albertini's film Supercolpo da 7 miliardi (1966). After a positive reception from the audience, Maggi met with Albertini to sign a contract to shoot a film in Venezuela and that Maggi stipulated that Ambrogio Molteni had to be a co-scripter.

The film was shot in and near Caracas with various professional wrestlers as cast members. The film's climax scene had the Venezuelan producers choose the a location and get press and television to film the shooting. The scene involved Attilio Severini being hung from a helicopter and dropped into the sea. After Serverini landed in the water, several motorboats were appearing within the shot, which led to Albertini getting his crew to zoom in on the shot to have it for the film. The production manager reported sent the boats out to get to Severini as the sea was full of barracudas.

== Release ==
Goldface, the Fantastic Superman was released in 1967 in Italy. It was released in Spain as Goldface on 18 September 1971 where it sold 522,832 admissions.
