= Bitto Albertini =

Italian film director and screenwriter

- Born: Adalberto "Bitto" Albertini; 14 July 1924; Turin, Piedmont, Italy
- Died: 22 February 1999 (aged 74); Zagarolo, Lazio, Italy
- Occupations: Film director, screenwriter

Adalberto "Bitto" Albertini (1924–1999) was an Italian film director and screenwriter.

== Career ==
He began his film career as a camera operator and as a cinematographer. In 1974 Albertini directed Black Emanuelle starring the then almost unknown Laura Gemser. Her subsequent successful career meant that she was absent from Black Emanuelle 2, and Albertini instead cast actress Shulamith Lasri in the title role.

In 1977 he released Yellow Emanuelle as a comeback. The film, starring Chai Lee, was very successful. However the film never reached the popularity of Joe D'Amato's series. His last two films were "Mondos" set in Asia, depicting shocking rituals and savage violence.

Albertini wrote an autobiographical collection of anecdotes entitled Tra un ciak e l'altro, which was published by a small Sicilian publishing house in 1998.

He died in Italy in 1999 at age 74.

== Selected filmography ==
- Feathers in the Wind (1950)
- That Ghost of My Husband (1950)
- Brief Rapture (1951)
- A Woman Has Killed (1952)
- Red Love (1952)
- Matrimonial Agency (1953)
- The Song of the Heart (1955)
- The Red Cloak (1955)
- Captain Falcon (1958)
- Toto's First Night (1962)
- Sandokan to the Rescue (1964)
- Sandokan Against the Leopard of Sarawak (1964)
- Goldface, the Fantastic Superman (1967)
- Three Supermen in Tokyo (1968)
- War Devils (1969)
- Three Supermen in the Jungle (1970)
- Human Cobras (1971)
- Zambo, King of the Jungle (1972)
- Metti lo diavolo tuo ne lo mio inferno (1972)
- Supermen Against the Orient (1973)
- Return of Shanghai Joe (1975)
- Black Emanuelle (1975)
- Black Emanuelle 2 (1976)
- Yellow Emanuelle (1977)
- Safari Rally (1978)
- Naked and Cruel (1984)
