= Bluebeard (1972 film) =

1972 film by Edward Dmytryk

- Theatrical release poster
- Directed by: Edward Dmytryk
- Screenplay by: Ennio De Concini; Edward Dmytryk; Maria Pia Fusco
- Produced by: Alexander Salkind
- Starring: Richard Burton; Raquel Welch; Virna Lisi; Nathalie Delon; Marilù Tolo; Karin Schubert; Agostina Belli; Sybil Danning; Joey Heatherton; Edward Meeks; Jean Lefebvre; Mathieu Carrière
- Cinematography: Gábor Pogány
- Edited by: Jean Pavel
- Music by: Ennio Morricone
- Production companies: Gloria Film S.r.l.; Barnabé Productions S.a.r.l.; Geiselgasteig Film GmbH
- Distributed by: Cinerama Releasing Corporation
- Release dates: 15 August 1972 (Pantages Theatre, Hollywood); 15 December 1972 (West Germany)
- Running time: 115 minutes
- Countries: Italy; France; West Germany
- Language: English
- Box office: $1.2 million

Bluebeard is a 1972 film written and directed by Edward Dmytryk and starring Richard Burton, Raquel Welch, Joey Heatherton, and Sybil Danning.

The film's plot is very loosely based on the French folktale of a nobleman whose latest wife grows curious when he tells her she may enter any room in his castle but one.

== Plot ==
In Austria in the 1930s, Baron Kurt von Sepper is a World War I veteran fighter pilot with a reputation as a "ladykiller" and a frightening blue-tinged beard. In public the Baron carefully maintains his image as a war hero, a seemingly devout Catholic and a patriotic member of the Fatherland Front, but the Baron has two dark secrets he is keen to hide. All of his previous wives have died in mysterious circumstances, and he exploited the chaos of the Austrian Civil War to instigate a pogrom against a Jewish community.

== Cast ==
- Richard Burton as Baron Kurt Von Sepper
- Raquel Welch as Magdalena
- Virna Lisi as Elga
- Nathalie Delon as Erika
- Marilù Tolo as Brigitte
- Karin Schubert as Greta
- Agostina Belli as Caroline
- Sybil Danning as The Prostitute
- Joey Heatherton as Anne
- Edward Meeks as Sergio
- Doka Bukova as Rosa
- Jean Lefebvre as Greta's Father
- Erica Schramm as Greta's Mother
- Karl-Otto Alberty as Baron's Friend
- Kurt Großkurth as Baron's Friend
- Thomas Fischer as Baron's Friend
- Martin Urtel as Baron's Friend
- Mag-Avril as Marka
- Sándor Szabó as The Doctor
- Dennis Burgess as The Coroner
- Mathieu Carrière as The Violinist

== Production ==
Filmportal.de noted that some sources claim that Luciano Sacripanti also directed the film.

Filming took place in Budapest, Hungary and Rome, Italy. In February, 1972, Burton's wife, Elizabeth Taylor celebrated her 40th birthday in Budapest. The party, held at the Hotel Intercontinental, was attended by several celebrities, including Michael Caine, Grace Kelly, Ringo Starr, David Niven, and Raquel Welch, and became a huge media sensation in the then-Communist country.

== Release ==
Bluebeard had its world premiere at the Pantages Theatre in Hollywood on August 15, 1972. It was released in West Germany on December 15, 1972.

== Reception ==
=== Critical response ===
Roger Ebert gave the film two stars out of four and wrote, "There is no longer any novelty in watching the sad disintegration of Richard Burton's acting career." Roger Greenspun of The New York Times wrote: "I have rarely seen a horror film so coyly aware of its own camp potential. But it is better at being foolishly serious than at being slyly humorous, and its few good moments come before it admits that its spook lightning and its maybe 3,000 pounds of phony cobwebs are essentially a joke." Gene Siskel of the Chicago Tribune gave the film one star out of four and wrote that the scenes of sadism "are designed to pander to people who enjoy seeing women abused". He put the film on a year-end list he made of the sickest films of 1972. Variety called it "high camp". Kevin Thomas of the Los Angeles Times panned the film as "123 minutes of unrelieved boredom and morbidity", adding: "Heavily made up and dyed, and speaking in a post-synched German accent, Burton seems to be sleepwalking."

Gary Arnold of The Washington Post wrote: "Bluebeard is so lacking in both style and conviction that it's often more muddled and ineffective than actively offensive." He wrote of Burton that "unless he's contemplating a permanent career in exploitation movies, it would be difficult to sink below this credit ... his final words are, 'This is ridiculous', but he's done nothing to convince us that he's superior to the material, that he's just doing some good-humored slumming and ought to be indulged his bad judgment". Clyde Jeavons of The Monthly Film Bulletin faulted "Dmytryk's indecision over whether to plump for black comedy or straight-faced horror, and it demonstrates his overall failure to find either a style or a formula sturdy enough to carry the film's heavy burden of absurdities and plain bad acting".

Videohound's Golden Movie Retriever refers to the film as a "soporific remake of the famous story."

John Stanley writes: "Director Edward Dmytryk provides titillation, soft-core nudity, lesbianism, sadism. But scenes are played so flatly, one doesn't know if to laugh or scream."
