= Gastone Pescucci =

Italian actor and voice actor

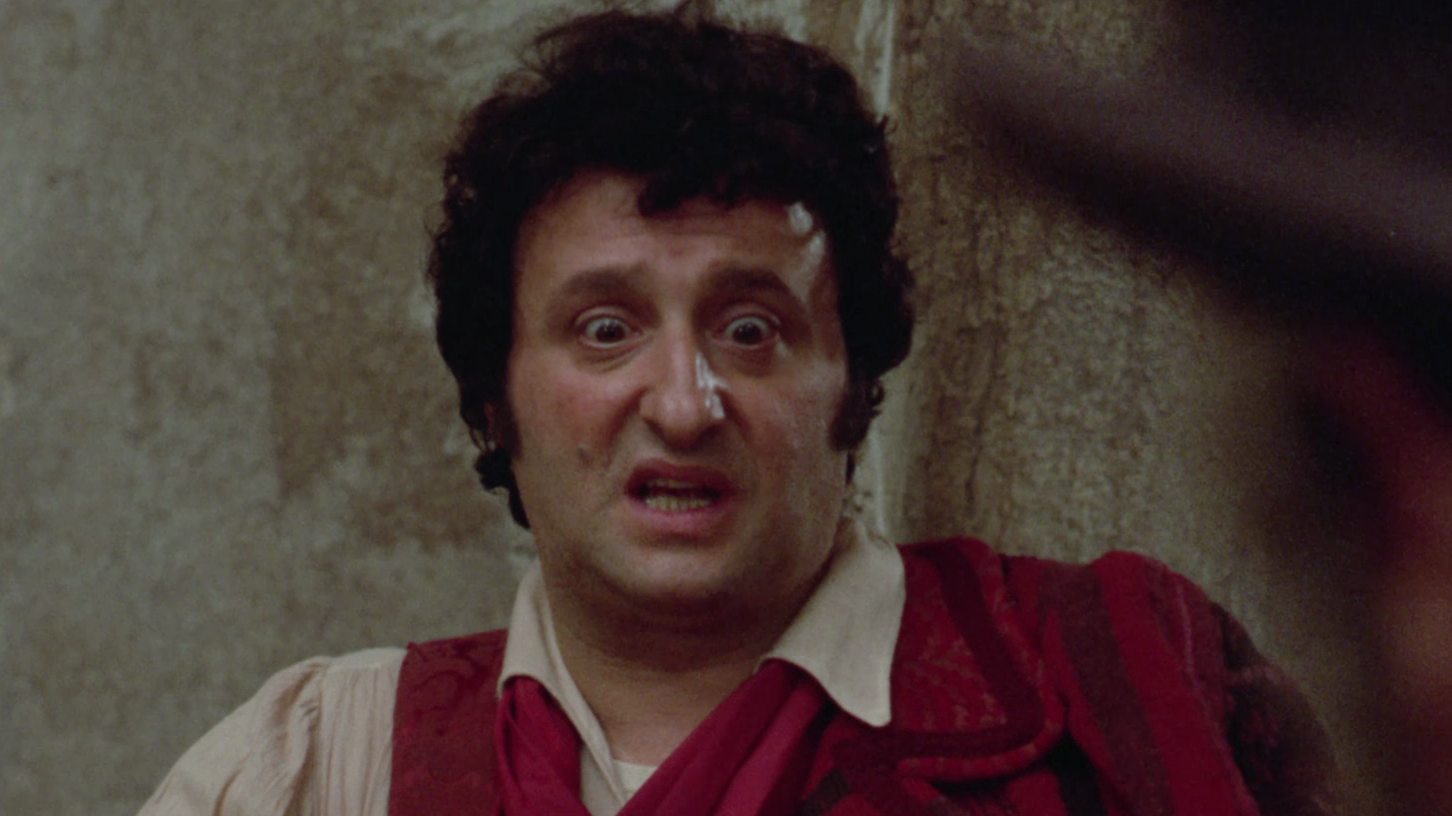
- Pescucci in Rugantino (1973)
- Born: 21 July 1926; Certaldo, Italy
- Died: 28 October 1999 (aged 73); Florence, Italy
- Occupation: Actor

Gastone Pescucci (21 July 1926 – 28 October 1999) was an Italian actor and voice actor.

== Life and career ==
Born in Certaldo, Pescucci was mainly active on stage, where he alternated between classics and modern works. He was also active on television and in films, being mainly cast in humorous roles.

== Selected filmography ==
- The Two Crusaders (1968)
- Oh, Grandmother's Dead (1969)
- Double Face (1969)
- Between Miracles (1971)
- Boccaccio (1972)
- House of 1000 Pleasures (1973)
- A forza di sberle (1974)
- Scandal in the Family (1975)
- Substitute Teacher (1975)
- At Last, at Last (1975)
- The Family Vice (1975)
- Confessions of a Lady Cop (1976)
- La professoressa di scienze naturali (1976)
- La dottoressa sotto il lenzuolo (1976)
- Il marito in collegio (1977)
- Taxi Girl (1977)
- Sesso e volentieri (1982)
- S.P.Q.R.: 2,000 and a Half Years Ago (1994)
