= Lydia Alfonsi =

Italian actress (1928–2022)

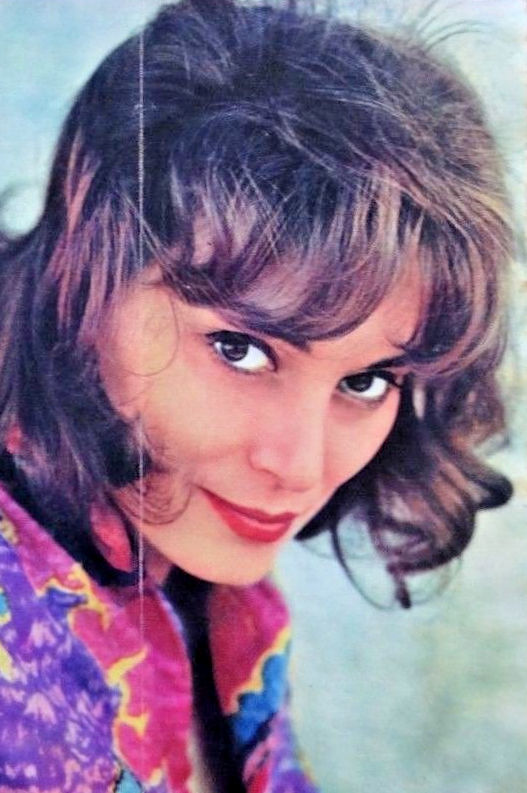
- Alfonsi in 1962
- Born: Lidia Alfonsi; 28 April 1928; Parma, Kingdom of Italy
- Died: 21 September 2022 (aged 94); Parma, Italy
- Occupation: Actress
- Years active: 1950–1997
- Spouse: Vincenzo Messina (m. 1973)

Lydia Alfonsi (28 April 1928 – 21 September 2022) was an Italian actress.

== Life and career ==
Born Lidia Alfonsi in Parma into a wealthy middle-class family, Alfonsi interrupted her accounting studies at a young age to pursue a career in theater. In 1946 she won in a national competition for amateur dramatics and was noticed by one of the judges, the director Anton Giulio Bragaglia, who immediately hired her for his stage company. Soon she was cast in leading roles in dramas and often in classical works, including many Greek tragedies. In 1957 she made her film debut. In 1960 she began a professional and romantic relationship with television director Giacomo Vaccari, starring in several successful RAI TV-dramas directed by him. Their relationship ended with his death in a car accident in 1963. In the mid-1970s Alfonsi semi-retired, making sporadic appearances only in 1988 (with the TV movie Una lepre con la faccia da bambina), in 1990 (in Gianni Amelio's Open Doors) and in 1997 (in Roberto Benigni's Life Is Beautiful).

Alfonsi was appointed Grand Officer of the Italian Republic.

== Death ==
Alfonsi died on 21 September 2022, at the age of 94.

== Filmography ==
Year	Title	Role	Notes
1950	A Dog's Life	Friend of Franca	Uncredited
1951	Brief Rapture		
1957	Susana y yo	Julia	
1957	Manos sucias	Pilar	
1958	Hercules	The Sybil	
1959	The Law	Giuseppina	
1960	The Loves of Hercules	Megara	Uncredited
1960	Silver Spoon Set	The Young Actress	
1960	Morgan, the Pirate	Dona Maria	
1961	The Trojan Horse	Cassandra	
1962	A Man for Burning	Francesca	
1963	Noche de verano	Carmen	
1963	Black Sabbath	Mary	(segment "Il telefono")
1965	La violenza e l'amore	Lucia	
1967	The Strange Night	Erika	
1967	Face to Face	Belle de Winton	
1969	L'amore è come il sole	Ursula	
1969	Love Birds	Conny	
1973	Lady Dynamite	Costanza Cavallo	
1990	Open Doors	Marchesa Anna Pironti	
1992	Trittico di Antonello	Saveria	
1997	Life Is Beautiful	Guicciardini	(final film role)
