= One Man Against the Organization =

1975 film

- Directed by: Sergio Grieco
- Written by: Sergio Grieco; Rafael Romero Marchent
- Starring: Howard Ross; Karin Schubert; Stephen Boyd
- Cinematography: Fernando Arribas
- Edited by: Mario Gargiulo
- Music by: Luis Bacalov
- Release date: 1975
- Countries: Italy; Spain; France
- Language: Italian

One Man Against the Organization (Italian: L'uomo che sfidò l'organizzazione, Spanish: El hombre que desafió a la organización, French: L'Homme qui défia l'Organisation) is a 1976 crime film directed by Sergio Grieco and starring Howard Ross, Karin Schubert and Stephen Boyd.

== Cast ==
- Howard Ross as Steve
- Karin Schubert as Maggie
- Stephen Boyd as Inspector Stephen McCormick
- Jean-Claude Dreyfus as Lady Rebecca Rosenbaum
- Nadine Perles as Florence Gayle
- Alberto Dalbés as Harry
- José Calvo as Zaccaria Rabajos
- Pietro Torrisi as Harry’s Henchman
- Luciana Turina as Nun

== Production ==
The film was produced by Bi.Di.A. Film, José Frade Producciónes ans P.A.C. Production Artistique Cinematographic S.A. It was short between Rome, Madrid, Barcelona and Toledo.

== Release ==
The film was released in Italian cinemas by Italian International Film on 13 September 1975.

== Reception ==
One Man Against the Organization has been described as "more like a spy-movie than a crime film", and a film that "owes very little to the contemporary poliziotteschi, and is rather an update of classical ’60s heist / adventure yarns". It grossed 344.513 million lire at the Italian box office.
