= Sturmtruppen (film) =

- Directed by: Salvatore Samperi
- Screenplay by: Renato Pozzetto; Cochi Ponzoni; Maria Pia Fusco; Vittorio Vighi
- Based on: Sturmtruppen by Bonvi
- Starring: Renato Pozzetto; Cochi Ponzoni; Lino Toffolo; Teo Teocoli
- Cinematography: Giuseppe Rotunno
- Edited by: Sergio Montanari
- Music by: Enzo Jannacci
- Production companies: Irrigazione Cinematografica; Les Films Jacques Leitienne
- Release date: 1976 (Italy)
- Running time: 100 minutes
- Countries: Italy; France

Sturmtruppen is a 1976 comedy film directed by Salvatore Samperi. It is based on the homonymous Sturmtruppen comic books created by Bonvi.

== Cast ==
- Renato Pozzetto as Rookie
- Lino Toffolo as Rookie
- Cochi Ponzoni as General
- Teo Teocoli as Captain
- Felice Andreasi as Sergeant / The Pope
- Massimo Boldi as Rookie
- Corinne Cléry as The Actress, The Wife, The Woman at the Villa
- Jean-Pierre Marielle as The Unknown Soldier
- Umberto Smaila as The Cook
- Bonvi as The Prisoner

== Production ==
Strumtruppen is a film based on a comic book series written by Bonvi about the conflict in the trenches of World War II from the point of view of the German army. The comic series originally appeared in 1968. The idea to adapt Bonvi's scripts to a film came from producers Ermanno Donati and Luigi Carpentieri who had recently produced another popular Italian production set in World War II, Salon Kitty. The two got in touch with Bonvi through screenwriter Vittorio Vighi.

Filming was initially set to start in June 1976. The project eventually went through several different stages as Donati and Carpentieri were not convinced by the original director Ennio De Concini's vision of the film. The script was originally written by Vittorio Vighi and Maria Pia Fusco but these parts were dropped and director Salvatore Samperi signed as the director. De Concini later spoke about his involvement in Strumtruppen, stating that he "felt that my relationship with cinema was running out. [...] I did not feeling like doing [Strumptruppen]. I would have made a bad job and a bad movie."

== Release ==
Sturmtruppen was released in Italy in 1976. The film was a big box office hit in Italy, grossing over a one billion lire at the box office. The film's success led to a sequel, Sturmtruppen 2 - Tutti al fronte, which was written by Bonvi and again directed by Samperi.

== See also ==
- List of films based on comics
- List of Italian films of 1976
