= Mr. Hercules Against Karate =

- Directed by: Antonio Margheriti
- Screenplay by: Gianni Simonelli; Antonio Margheriti
- Story by: Luciano Vincenzoni; Sergio Donati
- Produced by: Carlo Ponti
- Starring: Roberto Terracina; Fernando Arrien; Jolina Mitchell; George Wang; Chai Lee; Sue Chang
- Cinematography: Luciano Trasatti
- Edited by: Mario Morra
- Music by: Carlo Savina
- Production company: Laser Film
- Distributed by: United Artists Europa
- Release date: 1973
- Running time: 104 minutes
- Country: Italy

Mr. Hercules Against Karate/Ming, ragazzi! is a 1973 Italian comedy Kung fu film directed by Antonio Margheriti that was filmed in Hong Kong, Singapore, Sydney and Bangkok. Produced by Carlo Ponti, the film features Bud Spencer and Terence Hill impersonators Alberto Terracina and Fernando Bilbao in a satire of the Kung-fu craze.

== Plot ==
The film is about Danny (Roberto Terracina) and Percy (Fernando Arrien) who are fired from an oil rig in Australia when Percy accidentally destroys it. They retreat to a Chinese restaurant where they meet the owner Wang who offers them $100,000 if they return his son Henshu who has been taken by Henshu's stepmother and her boyfriend, a kung fu master. The two agree and fly to Hong Kong.

== Reception ==
Tom Milne (Monthly Film Bulletin) gave the film a negative review, lamenting that one or two shots such as the carnival dragon in a dark alley "remind one that Margheriti has had his moments in the past as a minor-league Bava". Milne concluded that the film was "a dim carbon copy, studded with travelogue views and making heavy weather of its aimless roughhouse fights."

== Cast ==
- Alberto Terracina ... Danny / Dino (billed as Tom Scott)
- Fernando Bilbao ... Percy / Parsifal (billed as Fred Harris)
- Jolina Collins ... Ai-Lan (billed as Jolina Mitchell)
- Chai Lee ... Lee-Ping
- George Wang ... Ming
- Sue Chang ... Sue
- Luciano Pigozzi ... Chief of Police (billed as Alan Collins)

== Notes ==
=== References ===
- Palmer, Bill; Palmer, Karen; Meyers, Ric (1995). The Encyclopedia of Martial Arts Movies. Scarecrow Press. ISBN 1461672759.
