= Malicious (1973 film) =

1973 film by Salvatore Samperi

- Theatrical release poster
- Italian: Malizia
- Directed by: Salvatore Samperi
- Screenplay by: Ottavio Jemma; Salvatore Samperi; Alessandro Parenzo
- Story by: Salvatore Samperi
- Produced by: Silvio Clementelli
- Starring: Laura Antonelli; Turi Ferro; Alessandro Momo; Tina Aumont; Lilla Brignone; Pino Caruso; Angela Luce
- Cinematography: Vittorio Storaro
- Edited by: Sergio Montanari
- Music by: Fred Bongusto
- Production company: Clesi Cinematografica
- Distributed by: Rizzoli Film
- Release date: 29 March 1973
- Running time: 98 minutes
- Country: Italy
- Language: Italian
- Box office: 11,756,327 admissions (Italy)

Malicious (Italian: Malizia, lit. 'Malice') is a 1973 Italian erotic comedy-drama film co-written and directed by Salvatore Samperi. It stars Laura Antonelli, Turi Ferro and Alessandro Momo. The film follows the sexual desire of a widower and his three sons for their new attractive housekeeper. At the Silver Ribbons awards, Antonelli and Ferro won Best Actress and Best Supporting Actor, respectively. The film was entered into the 23rd Berlin International Film Festival. A sequel, Malizia 2000, was released in 1991, also starring Antonelli and Ferro.

== Plot ==
In the late 1950s, in the Sicilian town of Acireale, Ignazio La Brocca is a recently widowed textile merchant with three sons—18-year-old Antonio, 14-year-old Nino and six-year-old Enzio. Shortly after the funeral, an attractive young woman named Angela La Barbera arrives at Ignazio's house to work as a housekeeper, having been hired by his deceased wife before her death.

Angela proves to be a competent housekeeper, and her beauty attracts the attention of Ignazio and the two older sons. While Angela rebuffs Antonio's advances, Nino becomes infatuated with her. When Antonio harasses Angela, Nino confronts him and the two get into a fight. One night, to prevent Ignazio and Antonio from going into Angela's room and trying to seduce her, Nino throws a glass through a downstairs window from his room, which triggers the security alarm. Ignazio believes it was the ghost of his deceased wife that tried to stop him from seducing Angela.

When Ignazio proposes to Angela, Nino is deeply upset. He convinces his father that he has been haunted by nightmares and apparitions of his mother's ghost, although Angela sees through Nino's ruse. Nino soon begins to torment Angela by subjecting her to a series of psychological games, such as telling her not to wear a bra, having her climb a ladder so he can peek under her skirt, and getting her to take off her panties during a family dinner. Angela eventually agrees to undress for Nino in her room while he watches her through an attic window.

While Ignazio is away from home to obtain his stern mother's approval of the wedding, the power goes out on a stormy night, and Nino subjects an increasingly exasperated Angela to another of his games by chasing her with a flashlight and ordering her to undress. Completely naked, Angela grabs the flashlight and proceeds to taunt Nico, before she finally gives in to the boy's desires and has sex with him. Cured of his obsession, Nino gives his blessing to Ignazio and Angela's wedding, which is finally celebrated.

== Cast ==
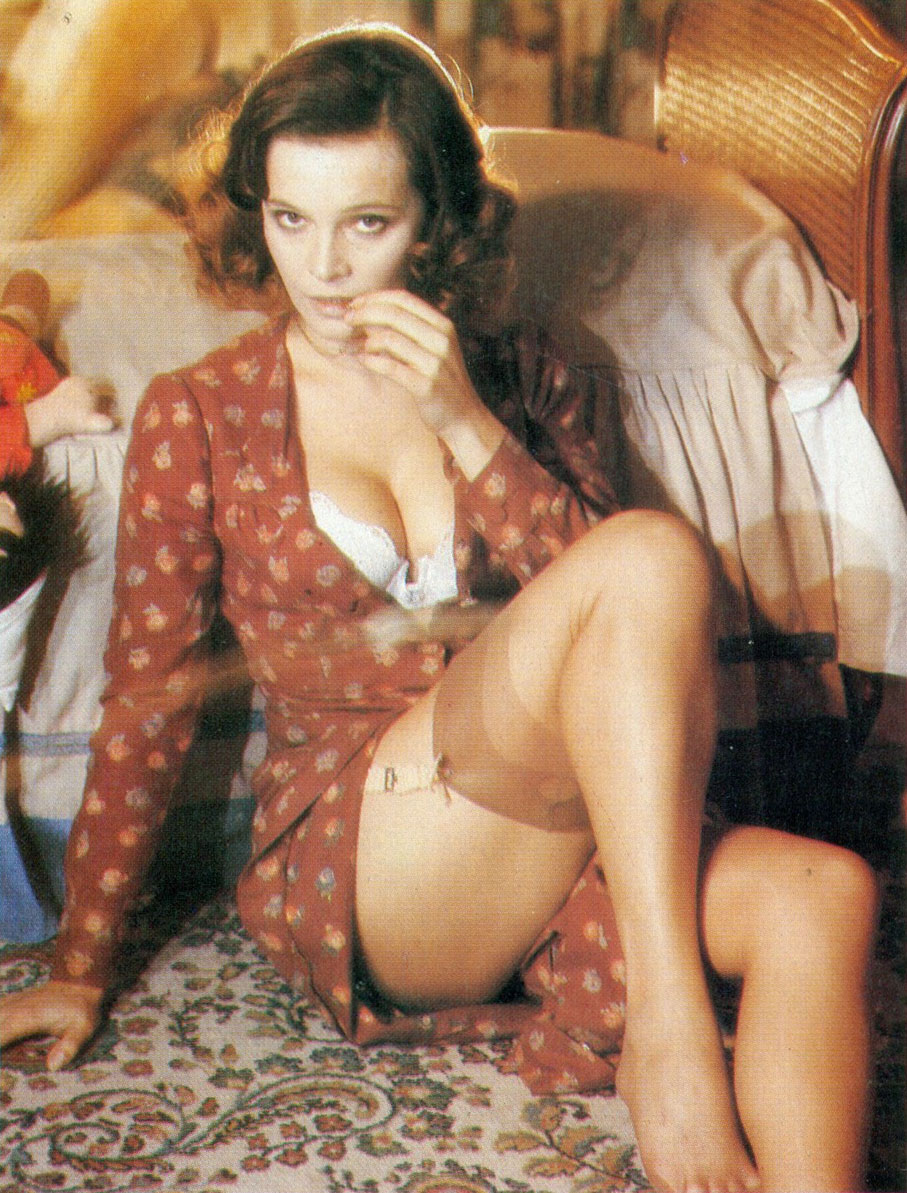
Antonelli in a still from the film

- Laura Antonelli as Angela La Barbera
- Turi Ferro as Ignazio La Brocca
- Alessandro Momo as Nino La Brocca
- Tina Aumont as Luciana Puglisi
- Lilla Brignone as grandmother
- Pino Caruso as Don Cirillo
- Angela Luce as widow Ines Corallo
- Stefano Amato as Stefano Puglisi
- Gianluigi Chirizzi as Antonio La Brocca
- Grazia Di Marzà as Adelina
- Massimiliano Filoni as Enzio La Brocca

== Reception ==
The film was the most popular Italian film in Italy in 1973 with 11,756,327 admissions, the 11th most of all time.
