= Emanuelle and the White Slave Trade =

1978 Italian sexploitation film

- Theatrical poster
- Italian: La Via della Prostituzione
- Directed by: Joe D'Amato
- Screenplay by: Romano Scandariato; Joe D'Amato
- Story by: Joe D'Amato
- Produced by: Gianfranco Couyoumdjian
- Starring: Laura Gemser
- Cinematography: Joe D'Amato
- Music by: Nico Fidenco
- Production companies: Fulvia Cinematografica; Gico Cinematografica; Flora film
- Distributed by: Variety Distribution
- Release date: 28 April 1978 (Italy)
- Running time: 88 minutes
- Country: Italy
- Language: Italian

Emanuelle and the White Slave Trade (Italian: La via della prostituzione, lit. 'The path of prostitution') is an Italian sexploitation film from 1978 directed by Joe D'Amato as his last Black Emanuelle film. It was also known as Emanuelle and the Girls of Madame Claude.

== Plot ==
Emanuelle is in Kenya to arrange an interview with the Italian American gangster George Lagnetti ("Giorgio Rivetti" in the English dub). She succeeds in meeting him with help from her friend Susan Towers and Prince Aurozanni but is intrigued by other events, leading her to meet the white slave trader Francis Harley, and setting her up for a dangerous undercover operation at the San Diego mansion of Madame Claude, which functions as a brothel for top-level dignitaries and civil servants.

== Cast ==
- Laura Gemser as Emanuelle
- Ely Galleani as Susan Towers
- Gabriele Tinti as Francis Harley
- Venantino Venantini as Giorgio Rivetti
- Pierre Marfurt as Prince Arausani
- Gota Gobert as Madame Claude
- Nicola D'Eramo as Stefan
- Bryan Rostron as Jim Barnes

== Background ==
Emanuelle and the White Slave Trade features the investigative journalist character known to her readers as 'Emanuelle' (Laura Gemser). Like most films directed or produced by Joe D'Amato, it is an attempt to capitalise on the commercial success of another film - in this case the 1977 film The French Woman (French: Madame Claude).

== Release ==
Emanuelle and the White Slave Trade was released in Italy on 20 April 1978. The film was heavily censored, with eight minutes cut in the theatrical release.

== Reception ==
John Pym of the Monthly Film Bulletin wrote it is "a flimsy, though surprisingly unsensational, yarn supposedly concerned with the horrors of 'white slavery'; the dismal artifice of the whole severely tests the viewer's patience."

Film critic Erik Sulev opined the movie "is a true treasure ... it is more goofy than lurid in spite of the title; without a doubt, this is vintage D'Amato — Why? — because it's the typical 'kitchen sink' styled movie that D’Amato enthusiasts will eat up, absurdities and all; everyone else will cringe at the results, but it's their loss; after thirty minutes into the movie, Emanuelle actually does end up on the trail of a white slavery ring based in San Diego."

Author Danny Shipka observed that "looking at the treatment of Emanuelle in her films, it's clear that most of the violence is directly aimed at her, and because most of her films have a mondo film to them, the violence is magnified; disturbingly, though, violence doesn't seem to be used as the aphrodisiac to get one in the mood, but to actually get one off."

== See also ==
- Cinema of Italy
- Black Emanuelle series
- List of Italian films of 1978
- List of LGBTQ-related films of 1978
