= Legend of the Sea Wolf =

- Directed by: Giuseppe Vari
- Screenplay by: Marcello Ciorciolini
- Starring: Chuck Connors; Barbara Bach; Ivan Rassimov
- Cinematography: Sergio Rubini
- Music by: Guido & Maurizio De Angelis
- Release date: August 4, 1975
- Running time: 92 minutes

Legend of the Sea Wolf (Italian: Il lupo dei mari, also known as Larsen, Wolf of the Seven Seas) is a 1975 Italian adventure film directed by Giuseppe Vari. It is based on the 1904 novel The Sea-Wolf by Jack London.

== Plot ==
Author and gentleman Humphrey Van Weyden is shanghaied and wakes up aboard Captain Larsen's ship on a seal hunting voyage of indeterminate length. Captain Larsen runs a tight ship using "hands on" techniques to quell on–board dissension. With seamanship unknown to Humphrey, he is assigned to the ship's cook as a scullery maid. The Captain informs Humphrey that the sea voyage will allow him to stand on his own two feet and not walk in his father's shoes.

Unsuccessful in their seal hunt, Captain Larsen decides to poach on the seal hunting area of his brother, Death Larsen. Their ship also rescues three survivors from a steamship that has exploded, Maud Brewster and two stokers.

== Cast ==
- Chuck Connors as Wolf Larsen
- Barbara Bach as Maud Brewster
- Giuseppe Pambieri as Humphrey Van Weyden
- Luciano Pigozzi as Thomas Mugridge
- Ivan Rassimov as Death Larsen
- Rik Battaglia
- Pino Ferrara
- Lars Bloch
- Maurice Poli
- Nello Pazzafini
- Renato Baldini
