= Angelo Infanti =

Italian actor

- Born: 16 February 1939; Zagarolo, Italy
- Died: 12 October 2010 (aged 71); Tivoli, Italy
- Occupation: Actor
- Years active: 1961–2010

Angelo Infanti (Italian pronunciation: [ˈandʒelo iɱˈfanti]; 16 February 1939 – 12 October 2010) was an Italian film actor. He appeared in more than 90 films between 1961 and 2010. He was born on 16 February 1939 in Zagarolo, Italy. He died on 12 October 2010 in Tivoli, Italy due to cardiac arrest.

Infanti is best known to non-Italian audiences as Fabrizio in The Godfather. Fabrizio was a bodyguard to Michael Corleone who was hiding in Sicily. Fabrizio betrays Michael by setting up explosives in his car, but kills his new bride instead. In the novel, Fabrizio is later shot dead in revenge for the killing. A scene was filmed of him being killed by the Corleones using a car bomb but was cut from the motion picture before its theatrical release. It appears in the 1977 The Godfather: A Novel for Television, which combined the first two films – The Godfather and The Godfather Part II, adding back scenes that had been previously cut and telling the story chronologically beginning with Vito Andolini's childhood in Sicily.

== Filmography ==
- Io bacio... tu baci (1961)
- Beautiful Families (1964) - (segment "Il principe azzurro")
- Bianco, rosso, giallo, rosa (1964) - Un cortigiano
- Con rispetto parlando (1965)
- La ragazzola (1965) - Alberto
- 4 Dollars of Revenge (1966) - Barry Haller
- Secret Agent Super Dragon (1966)
- Ischia operazione amore (1966) - Peppiniello Capatosta
- Ballad of a Gunman (1967) - Hud
- Tiffany Memorandum (1967) - Pedro Almereyda / Max Schultz
- Gungala, the Black Panther Girl (1968) - Morton
- Silvia e l'amore (1968)
- Amore o qualcosa del genere (1968) - Bruno
- Le 10 meraviglie dell'amore (1969) - Pericle
- The Appointment (1969) - Antonio
- Le lys de mer (1969)
- Children of Mata Hari (1970) - Jean / Gianni
- The Breach (1970) - Le docteur Blanchard
- Fragment of Fear (1970) - Bruno
- A Man Called Sledge (1970) - Prisoner (uncredited)
- Le Juge (1971) - Buck Carson
- Le Mans (1971) - Lugo Abratte
- Io non vedo, tu non parli, lui non sente (1971) - Claude Parmentier
- A Girl in Australia (1971) - Carmela's pimp
- The Valachi Papers (1972) - Lucky Luciano
- This Kind of Love (1972) - Bernardo
- The Godfather (1972) - Fabrizio - Sicilian Sequence
- Les hommes (1973) - Ange Leoni
- Flatfoot (1973) - Ferdinando Scarano "O'Barone"
- War Goddess (1973) - Theseus
- Giuda uccide il venerdì (1974)
- And Now My Love (1974) - A Stud
- The Girl in Room 2A (1974) - Frank Grant
- The Godfather Part II (1974) - Fabrizio (deleted scene)
- Black Emanuelle (1975) - Gianni Danieli
- The Count of Monte Cristo (1975) - Jacopo
- Jackpot (1975)
- Soldier of Fortune (1976) - Graziano d'Asti
- As of Tomorrow (1976) - Nino Andreotti
- Black Emanuelle 2 (1976) - Paul
- The Black Corsair (1976) - Morgan
- Highway Racer (1977) - Jean-Paul Dossena / il Nizzardo
- The Rip-Off (1978) - Inspector
- The Face with Two Left Feet (1979) - Raoul
- Ammazzare il tempo (1979)
- Flatfoot in Egypt (1979) - Hassan
- Savage Breed (1980) - Carlo Esposito
- Bianco, rosso e Verdone (1981) - Playboy
- The Dirty Seven (1982) - Falk
- Talcum Powder (1982) - Cesare Cuticchia / Manuel Fantoni
- Journey with Papa (1992) - Gianni
- Attila flagello di Dio (1982) - Fusco Cornelio
- The Scarlet and the Black (1983) - Father Morosini
- The Story of Piera (1983) - Tito / Giasone
- The Black Stallion Returns (1983) - Raj's Father
- The Assisi Underground (1985) - Giorgio Kropf
- Vediamoci chiaro (1985) - Gianluca
- A Thorn in the Heart (1986) - Roberto Dionisotti
- The Inquiry (1986) - Trifone
- L'estate sta finendo (1987) - Antonio Bonomiti
- Sottozero (1987) - Antonio
- Netchaïev est de retour (1991) - Joseph
- Money (1991) - Romano
- The Escort (1993) - Judge Barresi
- Alto rischio (1993) - Sjberg
- La Vengeance d'une blonde (1994) - Giacomo Contini
- Carogne (1995) - Don Alfredo
- Diapason (2001) - Marcello
- The Nest (2002) - Abedin Nexhep
- The Cruelest Day (2003) - Marocchino
- Il punto rosso (2006) - Burattinaio
- The Seed of Discord (2008) - Veronica's Father
- Many Kisses Later (2009) - Padre di Elisa
- Letters to Juliet (2010) - Chess Playing Lorenzo
- Backward (2010) - Luigi
- Prigioniero di un segreto (2010)
