= Alessandro Momo =

Italian actor (1956–1974)

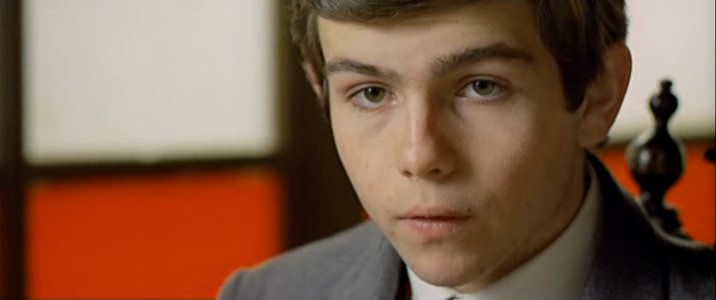
- Momo in Malicious (1973)
- Born: 26 November 1956; Rome, Italy
- Died: 19 November 1974 (aged 17); Rome, Italy
- Occupation: Actor
- Years active: 1969–1974

Alessandro Momo (26 November 1956 – 19 November 1974) was an Italian actor, most noted for his roles in Malicious (1973) and Scent of a Woman (1974). He died in a motorcycle accident in Rome on 19 November 1974, a few days before his 18th birthday.

== Biography ==
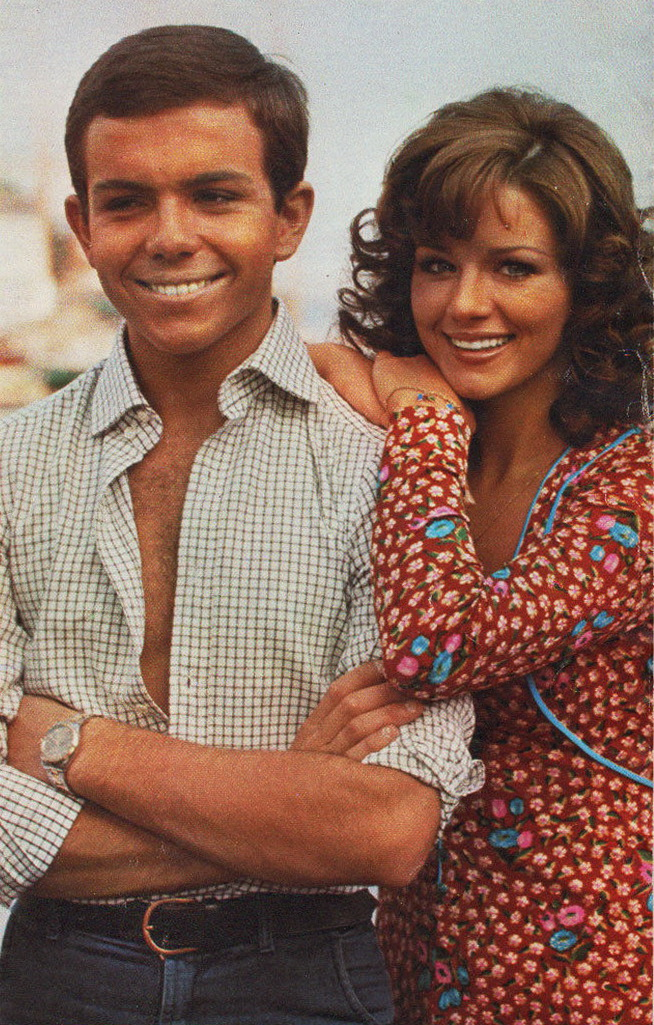
Momo with Agostina Belli in the set of 1974 film Scent of a Woman

=== Career ===
He began his career very young, as the protagonist in a series of fotoromanzi, also appearing together with Giusva Fioravanti.

He became famous thanks to his performances in the various film including The Police Serve the Citizens?, Lovers and Other Relatives, The Night of the Assassin, La scoperta, Malicious and his role in Profumo di donna (Scent of a Woman), by Dino Risi, where he co-starred with Vittorio Gassman and Agostina Belli.

=== Death ===
Momo died from a motorcycle accident in the weeks following the end of the making of the film Scent of a Woman. The motorcycle that had the fatal accident, a Honda CB750, was lent by his partner Eleonora Giorgi, who left for a trip; the actress was later investigated for reckless expectations because Momo was not yet 18 years of age and was not entitled to drive a motorcycle, according to the regulations at the time. Some time later, the singer Patrizio Sandrelli dedicated a song to his memory, which had some success, "Fratello in amore" ("Brother in Love").

== Filmography ==
- La scoperta (The Discovery) (1969)
- Il divorzio (The Divorce) (1970) – Fabrizio, the son
- Appuntamento col disonore (Rendezvous with Dishonour / The Night of the Assassin) (1970) – Alexander
- Malizia (Malicious) (1973) – Nino
- La polizia è al servizio del cittadino? (The Police Serve the Citizens?) (1973) – Michele
- Il vero coraggio (True Courage) (1973, TV Movie) – Agide
- Peccato veniale (Lovers and Other Relatives / Venial Sin) (1974) – Sandro
- Profumo di donna (Scent of a Woman) (1974) – Giovanni "Ciccio" Bertazzi (final film role)
