= The Divorce (1970 film) =

1970 film

- Directed by: Romolo Guerrieri
- Written by: Alberto Silvestri; Franco Verucci
- Produced by: Mario Cecchi Gori
- Starring: Vittorio Gassman
- Cinematography: Sante Achilli
- Edited by: Sergio Montanari
- Music by: Fred Bongusto
- Release date: 1970
- Running time: 100 minutes
- Country: Italy
- Language: Italian

The Divorce (Italian: Il divorzio) is a 1970 Italian comedy film directed by Romolo Guerrieri.

== Cast ==
- Vittorio Gassman: Leonardo Nenci
- Anna Moffo: Elena, Leonardo's wife
- Nino Castelnuovo: Piero
- Anita Ekberg: Flavia
- Riccardo Garrone: Umberto
- Claudie Lange: Sandra, Umberto's wife
- Alessandro Momo: Fabrizio, Leonardo's son
- Francesco Mulé: Friar Leone
- Helena Ronée: Daniela Gherardi
- Massimo Serato: Mario, Daniela's father
- Clara Colosimo: Isolina / Mafalda
- Nadia Cassini: Carolina
- Lars Bloch: Alex Bjørnson
- Renzo Marignano: Marco
- Umberto D'Orsi: Doctor
- Tiberio Murgia: Man at phone
- Mario Brega: News-vendor
