= The Police Serve the Citizens? =

- Directed by: Romolo Girolami
- Screenplay by: Massimo de Rita; Dino Maiuri
- Story by: Goffredo Sebasti; Marcello Serralonga; Mario Cecchi Gori
- Produced by: Mario Cecchi Gori
- Cinematography: Carlo Carlini
- Edited by: Antonio Siciliano
- Music by: Luis Enriquez Bacalov
- Production companies: Capital Film; P.E.C.F.
- Distributed by: P.I.C.
- Release date: 25 August 1973 (Italy)
- Running time: 98 minutes
- Country: Italy
- Box office: ₤1.033 billion

La polizia è al servizio del cittadino? (internationally released as The Police Serve the Citizens?) is a 1973 Italian giallo-poliziottesco film directed by Romolo Guerrieri. The film is set in Genova.

== Cast ==
- Enrico Maria Salerno: Commissioner Nicola Sironi
- Giuseppe Pambieri: Commissioner Marino
- John Steiner: Lambro
- Venantino Venantini: Mancinelli
- Alessandro Momo: Michele Sironi
- Memmo Carotenuto: Baron
- Marie Sophie Persson: Cristina
- Daniel Gélin: Ing. Pier Paolo Brera
- Gabriella Giorgelli: Eros, Prostitute
- Enzo Liberti: Greengrocer

== Release ==
The film was released on August 25, 1973. It was distributed by P.I.C. in Italy. The film grossed a total of ₤1.033 billion in Italy.
