= Romolo Guerrieri =

Italian film director

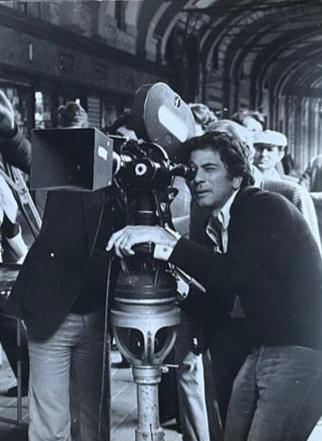
- Born: 5 December 1931 (age 94); Rome, Italy
- Occupations: Film director, Screenwriter
- Years active: 1961–1992

Signature
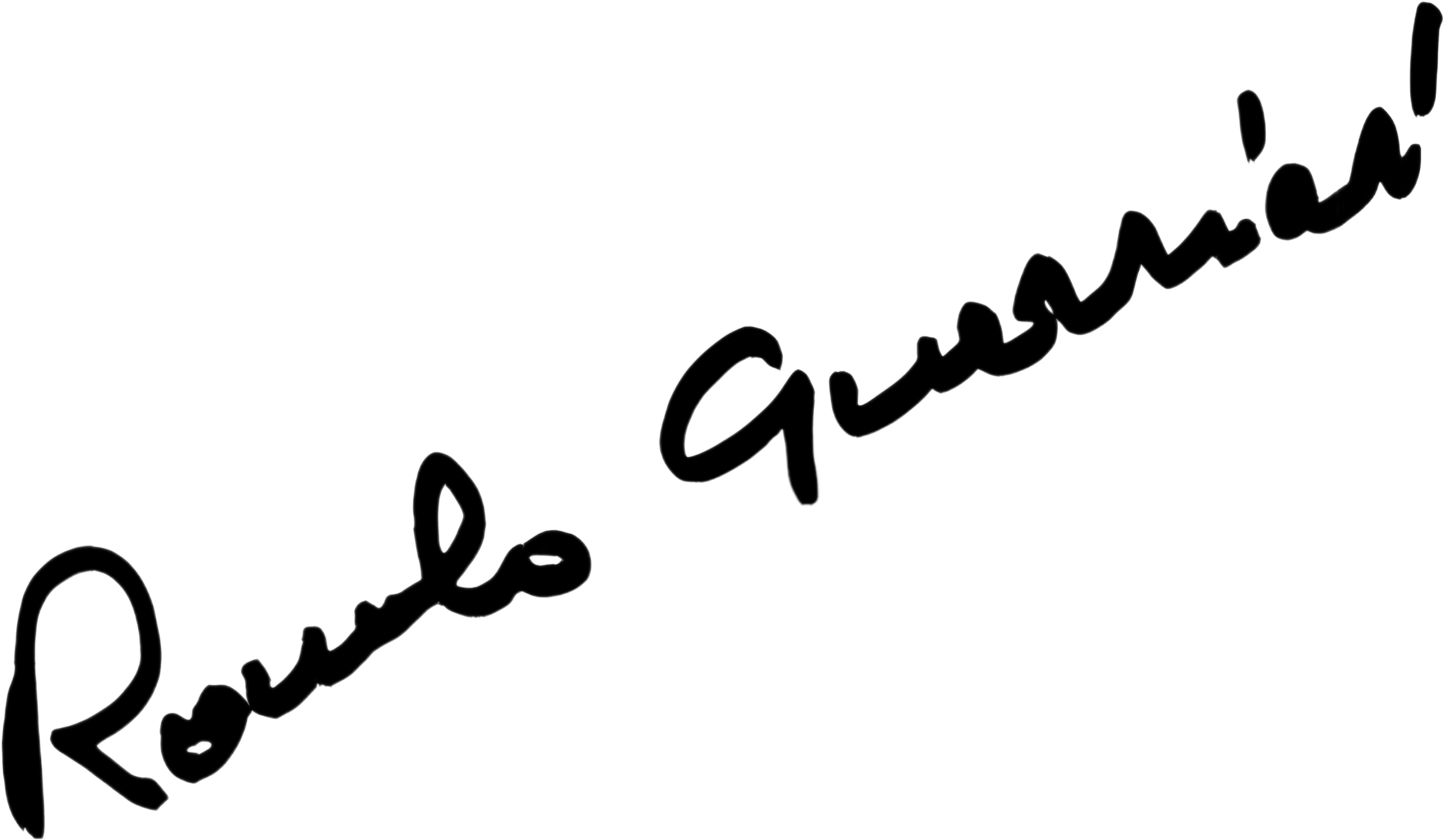

Romolo Guerrieri, aka Romolo Girolami (born 5 December 1931) is an Italian film director and screenwriter. He directed 17 films between 1961 and 1992.

== Biography ==
The younger brother of Marino Girolami, Guerrieri started his career as an assistant director to his brother in We Two Alone (1952). After several stints as an assistant director, he served as the second-unit director for Carlo Campogalliani's Sword of the Conqueror in 1961. In 1964 he served as a co-director for Giuseppe De Santis' epic war drama Attack and Retreat. In 1966, he made his directorial debut with the spaghetti western Seven Guns for Timothy, using the stage name Rod Gilbert. From 1966 onwards, he regularly directed films in various genres. Notable among his films, which were generally made on modest budgets, are the biographical drama film Salvo D'Acquisto and the giallo The Sweet Body of Deborah. From the late 1970s onwards, Guerrieri shifted his primary focus towards television. He directed several television films and miniseries, including the famous 1993 thriller The Last Stand, based on a novel by Alan D. Altieri.

== Selected filmography ==
Director

- Ten Thousand Dollars for a Massacre (1966)
- Johnny Yuma (1966)
- The Sweet Body of Deborah (1968)
- Detective Belli (1969)
- The Divorce (1970)
- The Double (1971)
- The Police Serve the Citizens? (1973)
- City Under Siege (1974)
- Salvo D'Acquisto (1974)
- Young, Violent, Dangerous (1976)
- Covert Action (1978)
- La gorilla (1982)
- The Final Executioner (1984)

Screenwriter

- Any Gun Can Play (1967)
- Cornetti alla crema (1981)
- Occhio, malocchio, prezzemolo e finocchio (1983)
- Trainer on the Beach (1984)
