= Sister Emanuelle =

1977 exploitation directed by Giuseppe Vari

- Directed by: Giuseppe Vari
- Written by: Gerolamo Collogno; Mario Gariazzo; Ambrogio Molteni; Palmambrogio Molteni
- Screenplay by: Marino Onorati
- Starring: Laura Gemser; Mónica Zanchi; Gabriele Tinti; Vinja Locatelli
- Cinematography: Guglielmo Mancori
- Edited by: Giuseppe Vari
- Music by: Stelvio Cipriani
- Distributed by: Variety Distribution
- Release date: 1977
- Running time: 88 minutes
- Country: Italy
- Language: Italian

Sister Emanuelle (Italian: Suor Emanuelle) is a 1977 exploitation film. It can be classified under both the nunsploitation and sexploitation exploitation film subgenres. It is part of the long running Black Emanuelle series of films starring Laura Gemser.

== Plot ==
Renouncing her sinful past, Emanuelle becomes a nun and moves into a convent, which also acts as an all-girl boarding school. Sister Emanuelle is eventually sent to pick up new student Monika, the daughter of a rich Baron. On a train back to the monastery, Monika tries to seduce Emanuelle. To do this, Monika lies about being previously raped by three men (whom she actually slept with willingly). When Monika kisses Emanuelle, the latter rejects her advances. In the middle of the night, Emanuelle wakes up and notices Monika missing. Emanuelle eventually finds her felating a man in the neighboring room. Ashamed, Emanuelle leaves without ever commenting on it.

At the boarding school, the lecherous Monika freaks out after noticing that there does not seem to be any men around (execept for the old gardener) and tries to escape. In the ensuing scuffle, everyone notices Emanuelle wears ordinary panties, not the more modest undergarment a sister must wear. She wears panties because they hurt her skin less, but still gets reprimanded by the Mother Superior.

Meanwhile, Monika gets assigned a room with Anna, a girl who is the top of her class. The nuns believe she can be a good influence on Monika. However, Monika quickly seduces her, and the two sleep together.

During a recreational trip to the nearby woods, Monika explores an old cottage and meets Rene, an armed criminal hiding there. The two start a sexual relationship. To maintain it, Monika shows him a way to get inside the boarding school. Every night, they have a sex in an abandoned tower. When Anna asks why she goes there every night, Monika says she is sleeping with Emanuelle. Jealous, Anna shouts at Emanuelle, who figures out what is going on. Discovering that Rene is armed and dangerous, Emanuelle decides to let their relationship continue, but convinces Anna that she is not sleeping with Monika.

While never revealing to Emanuelle the why to her lustful behavior, Monika does have an answer to why she is there: at her house, she seduced her stepmother. Her father walked in on them having sex, and enraged, he decided to send Monika as far away from him and his much younger wife as possible. Monika then lies about Rene demanding to sleep with Anna. To save Anna, Emanuelle sleeps with him instead. Monika brings Anna to the tower, and the two spy on Emanuelle unwillingly having sex with Rene. This turns the girls on, and they start having sex, too. Emanuelle eventually figures out that Monika lied to her, but before she can react, the gardener enters the tower with a shotgun, believing robbers have broken into the building. He does not get to see anything of what is going on, but makes enough commotion for the Mother Superior to start inquiring.

She deducts that whatever is going on, it is all the product of Monika's lecherous behavior. She sends Emanuelle to drive her back home. Angered by the sinful act she was made to do, Emanuelle drives Monika to the cottage instead. There, she ties Monika up, kisses her and undresses her. Made to believe this is an invitation for sex, Monika asks to be untied. Emanuelle ignores her request and reveals that Rene is there with them. He also refuses to untie her. Instead, Rene and Emanuelle start having sex in front of a frustrated Monika. This time, Emanuelle enjoys herself more. After doing that, she grabs a burning log and approaches its smoldering end to Monika's vagina.

Emanuelle then wakes up on the train, en route to the boarding school. On the bunk bed beneath her, Monika sleeps peacefully. Emanuelle feels relieved, believing that everything that has happened since the afternoon they met has been a dream. However, she discovers that the reality of the situation might be more complicated when Monika wakes up with a pain in her crotch area. Monika's arrival to the school is more peaceful this time. While Monika is being introduced to her new classmates, Emanuelle decides to abandon her life as a nun. Shocked, the nuns and girls quietly watch Emanuelle leave the convent in her civilian clothes.

== Cast ==
- Laura Gemser as Sister Emanuelle
- Mónica Zanchi as Monika Catsabriaga
- Gabriele Tinti as Rene
- Vinja Locatelli as Anna
- Pia Velsi as Sister Cecile
- Patrizia Sacchi as Mother Superior
- Dirce Funari as Monika's Stepmother
- Rik Battaglia as Catsabriaga
