= Ely Galleani =

Italian film actress (born 1953)

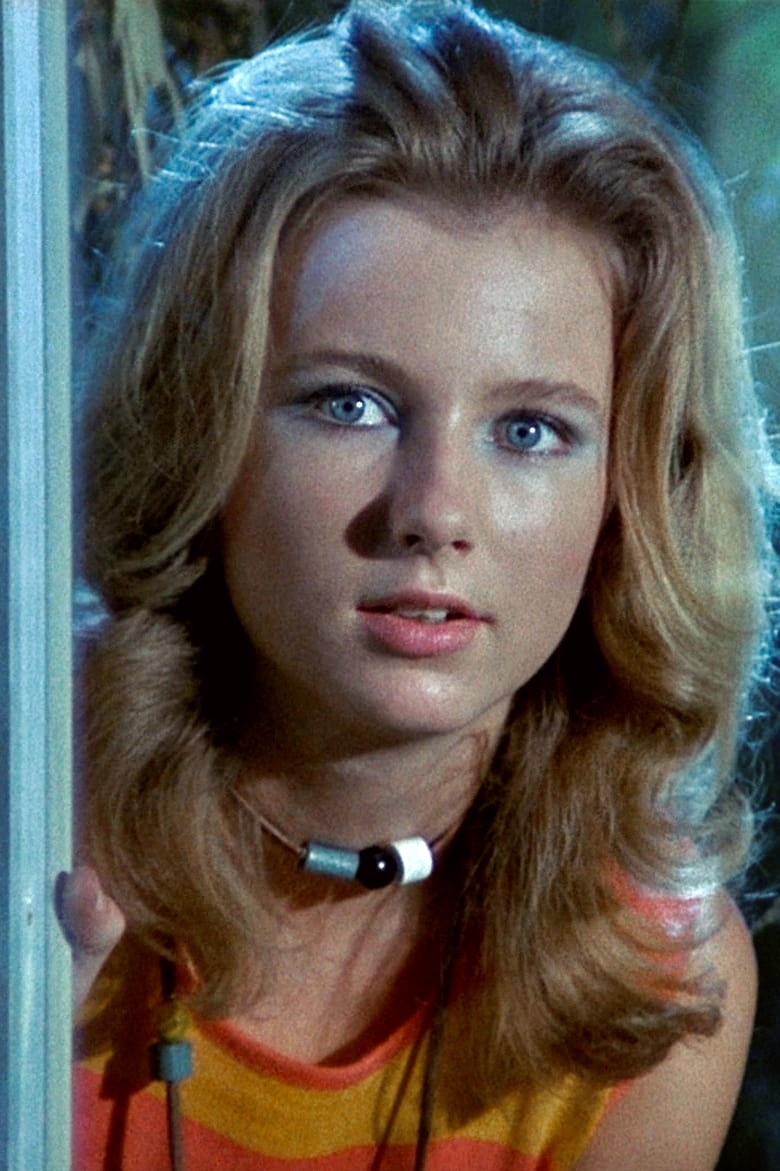
- Galleani in Five Dolls for an August Moon (1970)
- Born: Federica Elisabetta De Galleani; 24 April 1953 (age 73); Alassio, Savona, Italy
- Other names: Justine Gall; Ely Gall; Elly De Galeani; Elisabetta De Galleani; Edy Gall; Federica Galleani; Ely de Galleani
- Occupation: Actress
- Years active: 1970–1978

Ely Galleani (born Federica Elisabetta De Galleani; 24 April 1953), sometimes credited as Justine Gall and Ely Gall, is a retired Italian film actress.

Born in Alassio, Italy, as Federica Elisabetta De Galleani, daughter of an Italian count and of a Polish woman of Lithuanian origin, Galleani made her film debut in 1970 with a small role in Quella piccola differenza by Duccio Tessari, then appeared in a number of films with roles of more weight. Drug problems and a decline in Italian film production forced her to retire from acting in 1978. She moved on to a career as an accountant.

She was the half-sister of actress Halina Zalewska, who accidentally died in 1976, at 36, in a fire. Galleani is also the ex-wife of Italian filmmaker Carlo Vanzina.

== Selected filmography ==
- Quella piccola differenza (1970)
- The Swinging Confessors (1970)
- Five Dolls for an August Moon (1970)
- In the Name of the Italian People (1971)
- A Lizard in a Woman's Skin (1971)
- Roma Bene (1971)
- High Crime (1973)
- Redneck (1973)
- Sixteen (1973)
- Baba Yaga (1973)
- La prova d'amore (1974)
- The Devil Is a Woman (1974)
- Mark Shoots First (1975)
- Naked Massacre (1976)
- The Big Operator (1976)
- Emanuelle in Bangkok (1976)
- Black Cobra Woman (1976)
- La dottoressa sotto il lenzuolo (1976)
- Apache Woman (1976)
- Nero veneziano (1978)
- Cugine mie (1978)
- Emanuelle and the White Slave Trade (1978)
