= Lovers and Other Relatives =

1974 film by Salvatore Samperi

- Directed by: Salvatore Samperi
- Screenplay by: Sandro Parenzo; Ottavio Jemma
- Produced by: Silvio Clementelli
- Starring: Laura Antonelli; Alessandro Momo
- Cinematography: Franco Delli Colli
- Edited by: Sergio Montanari
- Music by: Fred Bongusto
- Release date: 1974
- Country: Italy
- Language: Italian

Lovers and Other Relatives, (Italian: Peccato veniale, also known as Venial Sin), is a 1974 Italian comedy film directed by Salvatore Samperi.

During the family vacation in the summer of 1956 on the beaches of Versilia, pubescent Sandro is charged with looking after the attractive wife, Laura, of his elder brother Renzo.

The movie was shot in Forte dei Marmi standing in for the coast of Versilia. It is set in 1956.

== Cast ==
- Laura Antonelli: Laura
- Orazio Orlando: Renzo
- Alessandro Momo: Sandro
- Monica Guerritore: Rosy, Sandro's other love interest
- Lino Toffolo: il bagnino
- Tino Carraro: Giustino Bellotto, father of Renzo and Sandro
- Lilla Brignone: mother of Renzo and Sandro
- Dominique Boschero
- Lino Banfi: il bagnino veneto
- Maurizio Mannocci: lo Smilzo
- Massimo Pellegrinj: friend of Rosy and boy on the beach
