= Planet of the Vampires =

1965 film by Mario Bava

- Italian theatrical release poster
- Italian: Terrore nello spazio
- Directed by: Mario Bava
- Screenplay by: Ib Melchior; Alberto Bevilacqua; Callisto Cosulich; Mario Bava; Antonio Román; Rafael J. Salvia; English version: Ib Melchior; Louis M. Heyward
- Story by: Ib Melchior
- Based on: "One Night of 21 Hours" (1960 story) by Renato Pestriniero
- Produced by: Fulvio Lucisano
- Starring: Barry Sullivan; Norma Bengell; Ángel Aranda; Evi Marandi
- Cinematography: Antonio Rinaldi; Mario Bava (uncredited)
- Edited by: Antonio Gimeno; Romana Fortini
- Music by: Gino Marinuzzi Jr.
- Production companies: Italian International Film; Castilla Cooperativa Cinematográfica; American International Pictures
- Distributed by: Società Italiana di Distribuzione (SIDIS) (Italy); C.B. Films (Spain)
- Release date: 15 September 1965 (Italy)
- Running time: 88 minutes
- Countries: Italy; Spain
- Languages: Italian; English
- Budget: $200,000
- Box office: £90 million (Italy); 38.2 million ESP (Spain) $251,000 (United States)

Planet of the Vampires (Italian: Terrore nello spazio, lit. 'Terror in Space'; released in the UK as The Demon Planet) is a 1965 science fiction horror film directed and co-written by Mario Bava, produced by Fulvio Lucisano, and starring Barry Sullivan and Norma Bengell. The screenplay was based on an Italian-language science fiction short story, Renato Pestriniero's "One Night of 21 Hours". Despite the American title there are no vampires in the movie. The film follows the horrific experiences of the crew members of two giant spaceships that have crash landed on a foreboding, unexplored planet. The disembodied inhabitants of the world possess the bodies of the crew who died during the crash, and use the animated corpses to stalk and kill the remaining survivors.

The film was co-produced by Italian International Film and American International Pictures (AIP), with some financing provided by Spain's Castilla Cooperativa Cinematográfica. AIP released Planet of the Vampires as the supporting film on a double feature with Daniel Haller's Die, Monster, Die! (1965).

== Plot ==
Two huge interplanetary ships on an expedition into deep uncharted space receive a distress signal emanating from Aura, an unexplored planet. Both ships, the Galliott and the Argos, attempt to land on the surface of the fog-encased world. While entering the planet's atmosphere, the crew of the Argos becomes possessed by an unknown force and try to violently kill each other. Only Captain Markary has the will to resist, and is able to force all of the others aboard his ship out of their hypnotic, murderous state.

After the Argos lands on the surface, the crew disembarks and explores the eerie landscape in search of the Galliott. Thick, pulsating mists, lit by ever-shifting eerie colors, saturate the terrain. When they finally arrive at the other ship, they find that the crew members have killed each other. Markary's younger brother, Toby, is among the dead. They proceed to bury as many of the corpses as they can, but several bodies are locked inside the ship's bridge. Markary departs to get tools for opening the sealed room, but the corpses disappear by the time he returns.

Some of the Argos' crew are found dead. Tiona sees their corpses walking in the ship, and becomes paralyzed with fear. Markary advises the survivors that they must escape from Aura. Unfortunately, the Argos incurred serious damage during the landing, and repairs will take time. During the waiting period that ensues, several more killings occur. In a private tape recording, Markary admits that he suspects none of them will survive.

While exploring Aura, Wess discovers the ruins of a spaceship a few miles from the Argos. Markary, Sanya and Carter investigate. Inside the ship, they discover large skeletal remains of the long dead crew and thus realize that they are not the first ones to have been drawn to the planet by the distress beacon. Markary and Sanya are temporarily trapped inside the ship, but manage to escape only to discover that Carter has inexplicably vanished. The two return to the Argos.

Two crew members of the Galliott, Kier and Sallis, arrive at the Argos to steal the ship's Meteor Rejector device. Kier escapes with the machine, but Markary fights Sallis. Markary tears open Sallis' uniform, exposing his putrescent body. He learns that Sallis' corpse is being manipulated by an Auran, who reveals that the two ships were lured to the planet in order for the Aurans to escape from their dying world. With the crew of the Galliott under their complete control, they plan to use the ship to escape to the humans' home planet. Markary vows to stop them.

Markary and his crew rush to the Galliott to retrieve the Meteor Rejector. They are successful, and manage to place explosives in the ship. During a struggle with the Aurans, Dr. Karan and Tiona are killed. Markary and Sanya return to the Argos and manage to escape as the Galliott is destroyed. After takeoff, however, they reveal themselves to be possessed by Aurans. They ask Wess, the last survivor, to join them. Wess refuses and sabotages the Meteor Rejector, but fatally electrocutes himself while doing so. Because the device has been broken beyond repair, and in consequence the spacecraft will never reach home, Markary and Sanya decide to change course for a nearby planet: when they come within visual contact, it's revealed that the planet is none other than Earth.

== Cast ==
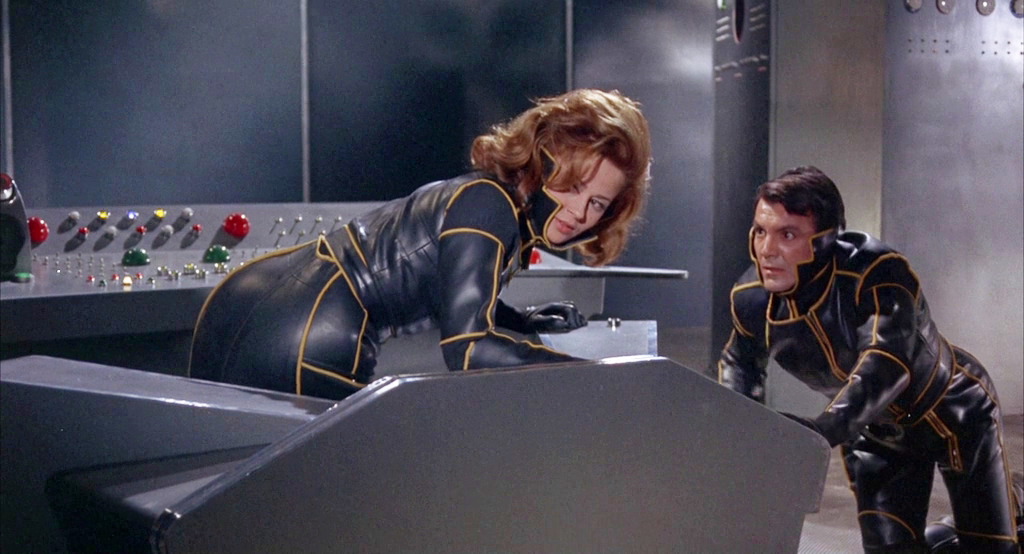
Norma Bengell as Sanya and Franco Andrei as Bert

- Barry Sullivan as Captain Mark Markary
- Norma Bengell as Sanya
- Ángel Aranda as Wess Wescant
- Evi Marandi as Tiona
- Franco Andrei as Garr ('Bert' in the English version)
- Federico Boido as Harry Gash
- Stelio Candelli as Mud ('Brad')
- Alberto Cevenini as Wan Markary ('Toby')
- Mario Morales as Eldon
- Ivan Rassimov as Dervy ('Carter')
- Massimo Righi as Captain Nordeg ('Sallis')
- Fernando Villeña as Dr. Karan

== Production ==
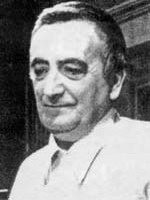
Director Mario Bava

American International Pictures had achieved a great deal of commercial success in the early 1960s with Bava's Black Sunday (1960) and Black Sabbath (1963), as well as dozens of lesser Italian films, including several sword and sandal pictures. Eventually, AIP heads Samuel Z. Arkoff and James H. Nicholson decided to coproduce some of these films, rather than just pay for the rights to distribute them, in order to have more control over their content. Planet of the Vampires was one such coproduction, financed by AIP and Italy's Fulvio Lucisano for Italian International Film, along with some Spanish production money provided by Castilla Cooperativa Cinematográfica. AIP provided the services of writer Ib Melchior, whose previous movies had included such modest hits as The Angry Red Planet (1959) and Reptilicus (1961), as well as the relatively big budget Robinson Crusoe on Mars (1964). Melchior wrote the screenplay for the English-language version of the film, with some assistance from AIP producer Louis M. Heyward.

American Barry Sullivan and Brazilian Norma Bengell led the cast of international actors. Before Bengell was cast, AIP regular and Arkoff's wife Susan Hart was considered for the female lead. Filmmaker Robert J. Skotak reported that each cast member "used their own native language on the set, in many cases not understanding what the other actors were saying." Sullivan's lines were spoken in English, Bengell's in Portuguese, Evi Marandi's in Italian and Ángel Aranda's in Spanish.

Restricted by a low budget, Bava was unable to utilize many opticals, so nearly all of the film's extensive visual effects work were done "in camera". Miniatures and forced perspective visuals are used throughout, with much colored fog adding atmosphere but also obscuring the sheer cheapness of the sets. Bava explained: "Do you know what that unknown planet was made of? A couple of plastic rocks — yes, two: one and one! — left over from a mythological movie made at Cinecittà! To assist the illusion, I filled the set with smoke."

According to Tim Lucas, the two plastic rocks were multiplied in several shots by mirrors and multiple exposures. The planet's exterior sequences were filmed on an empty stage obscured by mists, table top miniatures and Schüfftan process shots.

== Reception ==
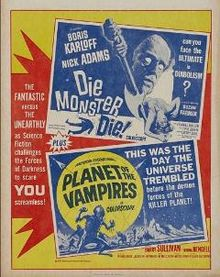
Planet of the Vampires poster advertising a double billing with Die, Monster, Die!

AIP released the film as the supporting film on a double feature with Daniel Haller's Die, Monster, Die! (1965).

=== Critical response ===
Planet of the Vampires has accumulated a very positive critical response since its release. In 1966, Castle of Frankenstein described the film as "Beautifully photographed Italian sfantasy with excellent sfx and superb color". Variety's Dool opined, "Plot is punctuated with gore, shock, eerie music and wild optic and special effects...Color camera work and production values are smooth and first class...Flash Gordon type story...should keep the young on the edge of their seats and the older set from falling asleep". Richard Davis, in Films and Filming, wrote that "Bava is tied to a grossly synthetic studio set which doesn't for a moment convince of its extraterrestrial reality...the piece on the whole is poor stuff". Monthly Film Bulletin noted the film was, "a triumph of mind over matter, or of Bava over a shoestring budget and appalling dubbed dialogue...[Bava] does atmospheric wonders with pastel-shaded fog and cunning camerawork". In 1974, Joe Dante wrote that the "fabulous comic strip sci-fi shows director Mario Bava at his most visually inventive..." Phil Hardy's The Aurum Film Encyclopedia: Science Fiction noted in 1984 that the film was "A gorgeous atmospheric confection from Bava...Bava's ever-moving camera creates a chilling sense of menace. The result is a triumph of the pulp imagination". Glenn Erickson (aka "DVD Savant") wrote in 2001 that "Bava's stunning gothic variation weaves a weird tale of flying saucers, ray guns and zombies that looks like no other space movie ever filmed". In Fangoria magazine, Tim Lucas said "Planet of the Vampires is commonly regarded as the best SF film ever made in Italy, and among the most convincing depictions of an alien environment ever put on film".

On the review aggregator website Rotten Tomatoes, 71% of 14 critics' reviews are positive, with an average rating of 6.4/10.

== Home video ==
The film has received four releases on home video in the United States. The first on VHS in 1993 was by Orion Home Video. Orion had purchased the Filmways which had purchased the American International Pictures catalog.

In turn MGM acquired the Orion pictures assets in 1997. In the U.S. MGM released the film on DVD on August 28, 2001. Kino Lorber released the film on Blu-ray on October 28, 2014. Kino Lorber reissued the film on Blu-ray with a new 2K restoration on July 26, 2022. In the U.K. a 4K restoration was released on Blu-ray by Radiance Films on May 27, 2024. A region locked 4K was released in Italy on January 26, 2023.

== Influence ==
Several critics have suggested that Bava's film was a major influence on Ridley Scott's Alien (1979) and Prometheus (2012), in both narrative details and visual design. Derek Hill, in a review of the MGM Midnite Movies DVD release of Vampires written for Images Journal, noted, "Bava's film (along with It! The Terror from Beyond Space, 1958) was a direct influence on Ridley Scott's 1979 film Alien. But where Scott's film tried to mask its humble drive-in origins, Planet of the Vampires revels in its origins. The film literally feels like a pulp magazine cover come to garish life..." Robert Monell, on the DVD Maniacs website, observed, "[M]uch of the conceptual design and some specific imagery in the 1979 Ridley Scott screamer undoubtedly owes a great debt to Mario Bava's no budget accomplishments." Govindini Murty of The Atlantic, in a review of Prometheus, said, "The striking images Ridley Scott devises for Prometheus reference everything from Stanley Kubrick's 2001 to Leonardo da Vinci's Vitruvian Man and Mario Bava's Planet of the Vampires."

One of the film's most celebrated sequences involves the astronauts performing an exploration of an alien, derelict ship discovered in a huge ruin on the surface of the planet. The crewmembers climb up into the depths of the eerie ship and discover the gigantic remains of long dead monstrous creatures. In 1979, Cinefantastique noted the remarkable similarities between this atmospheric sequence and a lengthy scene in the then-new Alien. The magazine also pointed out other minor parallels between the two films. However, both Alien's director Ridley Scott and screenwriter Dan O'Bannon claimed at the time that they had never seen Planet of the Vampires. Decades later, O'Bannon would admit: "I stole the giant skeleton from the Planet of the Vampires."

Tim Lucas has noted that the basic plot and ideas of the film not only inspired Alien but "continue to influence filmmakers and inspire the genre today, as witnessed by David Twohy's Pitch Black (2000) and Brian De Palma's Mission to Mars (2000)."

In the late 1970s Atlas/Seaboard Comics published a short-lived comic book entitled Planet of Vampires, which combined plot elements from Bava's film with elements of Planet of the Apes and I Am Legend.

Director James Wan stated the film strongly influenced his 2023 DC superhero film Aquaman and the Lost Kingdom.
