= Giuseppe Pambieri =

Italian stage, television and film actor

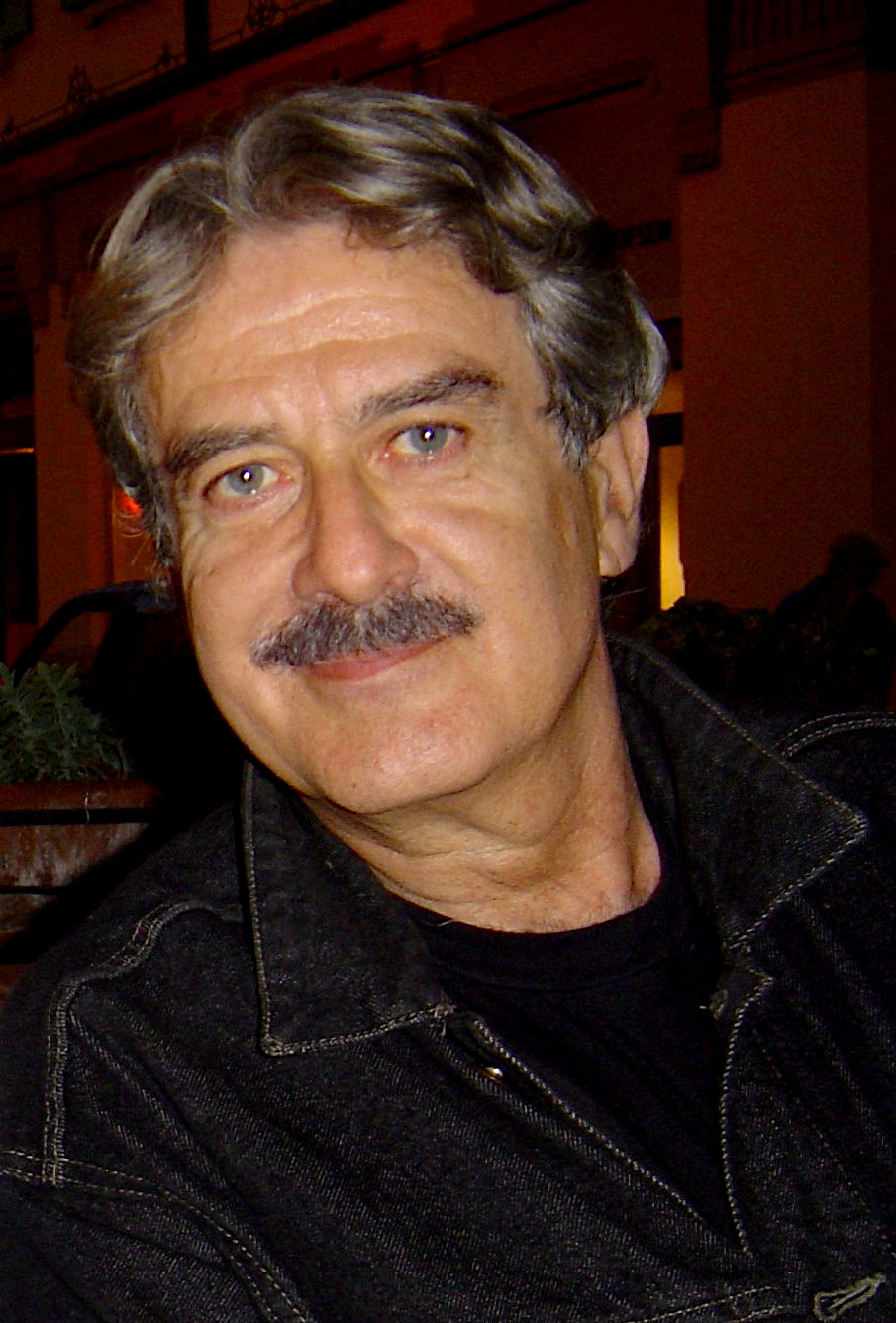
- Pambieri in 2003
- Born: 18 November 1944 (age 82); Rome, Kingdom of Italy
- Occupation: actor

Giuseppe Pambieri (born 18 November 1944) is an Italian stage, television and film actor.

== Life and career ==
Born in Varese, Pambieri studied acting at the Drama School of the Piccolo Teatro in Milan where he also met his future wife, the actress Lia Tanzi. He began his career appearing in television programs for children, then his breakout role was Remo in the 1972 RAI television series Le sorelle Materassi. Also active in films, Pambieri is mainly known for his works on stage, often starred together with his wife Tanzi and their daughter Micol. He considers himself Roman Catholic.

== Selected filmography ==
- The Police Serve the Citizens? (1973)
- La liceale (1975)
- Legend of the Sea Wolf (1975)
- L'affittacamere (1976)
- Confessions of a Lady Cop (1976)
- Hit Squad (1976)
- The Desert of the Tartars (1976)
- Yellow Emanuelle (1976)
- Ligabue (1978)
- Mathias Sandorf (1979)
- Count Tacchia (1982)
- My First Forty Years (1987)
- Everything's Gonna Be Alright (2020)
