= Yellow Emanuelle =

- Directed by: Bitto Albertini
- Screenplay by: Bitto Albertini
- Starring: Chai Lee
- Cinematography: Guglielmo Mancori
- Music by: Nico Fidenco
- Release date: 1976
- Country: Italy

Yellow Emanuelle (also released as Il mondo dei sensi di Emy Wong, Emanuelle Gialla, The Last Madame Butterfly) is a 1976 Italian film directed by Bitto Albertini, director of the prior Black Emanuelle.

== Plot ==
In Hong Kong, a British airline pilot, George Taylor (Giuseppe Pambieri), is assaulted by a gang of thugs. He is taken to a hospital and nursed back to health by physician Dr. Emy Wong (Chai Lee), a beautiful Chinese woman. As the pilot regains his health he becomes increasingly infatuated with Dr. Wong and they embark upon a passionate love affair. The pilot however develops a terminal illness and dies in the arms of Dr. Wong while they are making love. Overcome with grief she commits suicide, stabbing herself with a knife, before falling onto the body of George.

== Cast ==
- Chai Lee as Dr. Emy Wong
- Giuseppe Pambieri as George Taylor
- Ilona Staller as Helen Miller / Helga
- Claudio Giorgi
- Rik Battaglia
