= La dottoressa sotto il lenzuolo =

1976 film by Gianni Martucci

- Directed by: Gianni Martucci
- Written by: Giorgio Mariuzzo; Marino Onorati
- Produced by: Gianfranco Couyoumdjian
- Starring: Angelo Pellegrini; Karin Schubert
- Cinematography: Romano Scavolini
- Music by: Alessandro Alessandroni
- Distributed by: Variety Distribution
- Release date: 20 May 1976
- Running time: 87 minutes
- Country: Italy
- Language: Italian

La dottoressa sotto il lenzuolo (Translation: The Lady Doctor Under the Sheet) is a 1976 commedia sexy all'italiana film directed by Gianni Martucci and launched as part of dottoressa (female doctor) sexploitation theme. The film was also released as Under The Sheets.

== Plot ==
Three friends, students at the Pisa medical school are after their love adventures. Benito (Angelo Pellegrini) is trying to win the favours of Nurse Italia (Orchidea De Santis) but she seems to prefer the company of Prof. Ciotti (Gigi Ballista). Naïve Alvaro (Alvaro Vitali) is desperate to lose his virginity with his girlfriend Lella (Ely Galleani) without knowing that she lives a double life as a prostitute. Finally, Sandro (Eligio Zamara) is in love with the film's namesake Dr. Laura Bonetti (Karin Schubert), the fiancée of Prof. Paolo Cicchirini (Gastone Pescucci) who happens to be the butt of jokes at the medical school, and pretends to be sick to see her.

== Cast ==
- Karin Schubert
- Gastone Pescucci
- Orchidea De Santis
- Eligio Zamara
- Gigi Ballista
- Alvaro Vitali
