= The Girl in Room 2A =

1974 film by William Rose

- Theatrical release poster
- Italian: La casa della paura
- Directed by: William Rose
- Screenplay by: Gianfranco Baldanello
- Story by: William Rose
- Produced by: Dick Randall
- Starring: Daniela Giordano; Angelo Infanti; John Scanlon; Rosalba Neri; Brad Harris; Frank Latimore; Karin Schubert; Raf Vallone
- Cinematography: Mario Mancini; Giorgio Montagnani
- Edited by: Piera Bruni; Gianfranco Simoncelli
- Music by: Berto Pisano
- Distributed by: Variety Distribution
- Release date: 1975
- Running time: 84 minutes
- Country: Italy
- Language: Italian

The Girl in Room 2A (Italian: La casa della paura, lit. 'The House of Fear') is a 1975 Italian giallo film directed by William Rose, starring Daniela Giordano and Angelo Infanti.

== Synopsis ==
Margaret Bradley is young girl just paroled from jail who rents a room in house owned by Mrs. Grant. Soon, she is being stalked by a sadistic cult led by a mysterious killer in red vestments.

== Cast ==
- Daniela Giordano as Margaret Bradley
- Angelo Infanti as Frank Grant
- John Scanlon as Jack Whitman
- Rosalba Neri as Alicia Songbird
- Brad Harris as Charlie
- Frank Latimore as Johnson
- Giovanna Galletti as Mrs. Mary Grant
- Dada Gallotti as Claire
- Nuccia Cardinali as Mrs. Craig
- Karin Schubert as Maria
- Raf Vallone as Mr. Dresse

== Reception ==
Donald Guarisco from AllMovie criticized the film's cinematography, "amateurish performances", "limp" pacing, and direction. Guarisco concluded his review by writing, "The Girl In Room 2A is such an uninspired proposition that even hardcore giallo fans might want to think twice about watching it." Sean Becktel from HorrorNews.net wrote, "The Girl in Room 2A seems to know exactly what it is, and to cater to it's [sic] audience. It achieves a formulaic deliverance, while staying fun, enjoyable, and ultimately entertaining." Terror Trap gave the film 2.5 out of 4 stars, stating the film was "at times incomprehensible" but still great fun. Brett Gallman from Oh, the Horror valeld it "one of the more dull and dry entries of the genre".

== Production ==
Shooting took place in the summer of 1974 in Rome. William Rose chose to film in Italy instead of America due to cheaper production costs, noting that the film was shot on a budget of $60,000, whereas in America it would have cost $300,000.
