= Rudeness (film) =

- Directed by: Marino Girolami
- Screenplay by: Antonio Margheriti; Luigi Russo
- Story by: Antonio Margheriti; Luigi Russo
- Produced by: Luigi Nannerini; Gabriele Crisanti
- Starring: Leonard Mann; Gianni Russo; Karin Schubert; Hélène Chanel; Guido Celano
- Cinematography: Franco Villa
- Edited by: Otello Colangelli
- Music by: Vasili Kojucharov
- Production companies: Starkiss Cinematografica; Nouvelles Les Films Oceanic
- Distributed by: Film Audax
- Release date: 11 May 1975 (Italy)
- Running time: 105 minutes
- Countries: Italy; France

Rudeness (Italian: Lo sgarbo, French: Le châtiment) is a 1975 film directed by Marino Girolami.

== Plot ==
Salvatore, a young mafioso, is sent back to Sicily, after living for a long time in America, because of problems in his relations with Cosa Nostra. He is entrusted to the care of Don Mimì, the mafia boss in Palermo, who is forced to live on a wheelchair, and who lives with his young and beautiful lover, Marina, an orphan initially welcomed by the boss as a daughter. But Salvatore sets his sights on Marina, falling deeply in love with her and being reciprocated. This can only arouse the wrath of Don Mimì, who unleashes his men on the trail of the cunning Salvatore. The latter manages to take refuge in London with Maria, where he assumes the monopoly of the prostitution racket, orchestrating some lucrative scandals to the detriment of eminent personages, whom he blackmails. But the ruthless revenge, against him and Marina who has joined him in London, is not long in coming.

== Cast ==
- Leonard Mann as Vito
- Gianni Russo as Salvatore Mannino (credited as Luis Vito Russo)
- Karin Schubert as Marisa
- Hélène Chanel as Lady White
- Guido Celano as Don Mimì
- Arturo Dominici as Don Lipari
- Samantha Elgard as Rosalia
- Tom Felleghy as Mr. Greenberg
- Renzo Marignano as Lord Walley
- Attilio Dottesio as Man killed in the gambling room
- Nello Pazzafini as Bouncer

== Production ==
Following the release of The Godfather, films about the mafia in Italy were struggling with their earlier commercial appeal basically having vanished. This led to later day films, such as Rudeness being overtly focused on sex.

Rudeness was shot at Incir-de Paolis Studios in Rome and on location in Palermo and Paris. Most of the film was shot in studios and included a lot of stock footage of streets and airports.

== Release ==
Rudeness was distributed theatrically by Film Audax in Italy on May 11, 1975, with a 105-minute running time.
