= Venantino Venantini =

Italian actor (1930–2018)

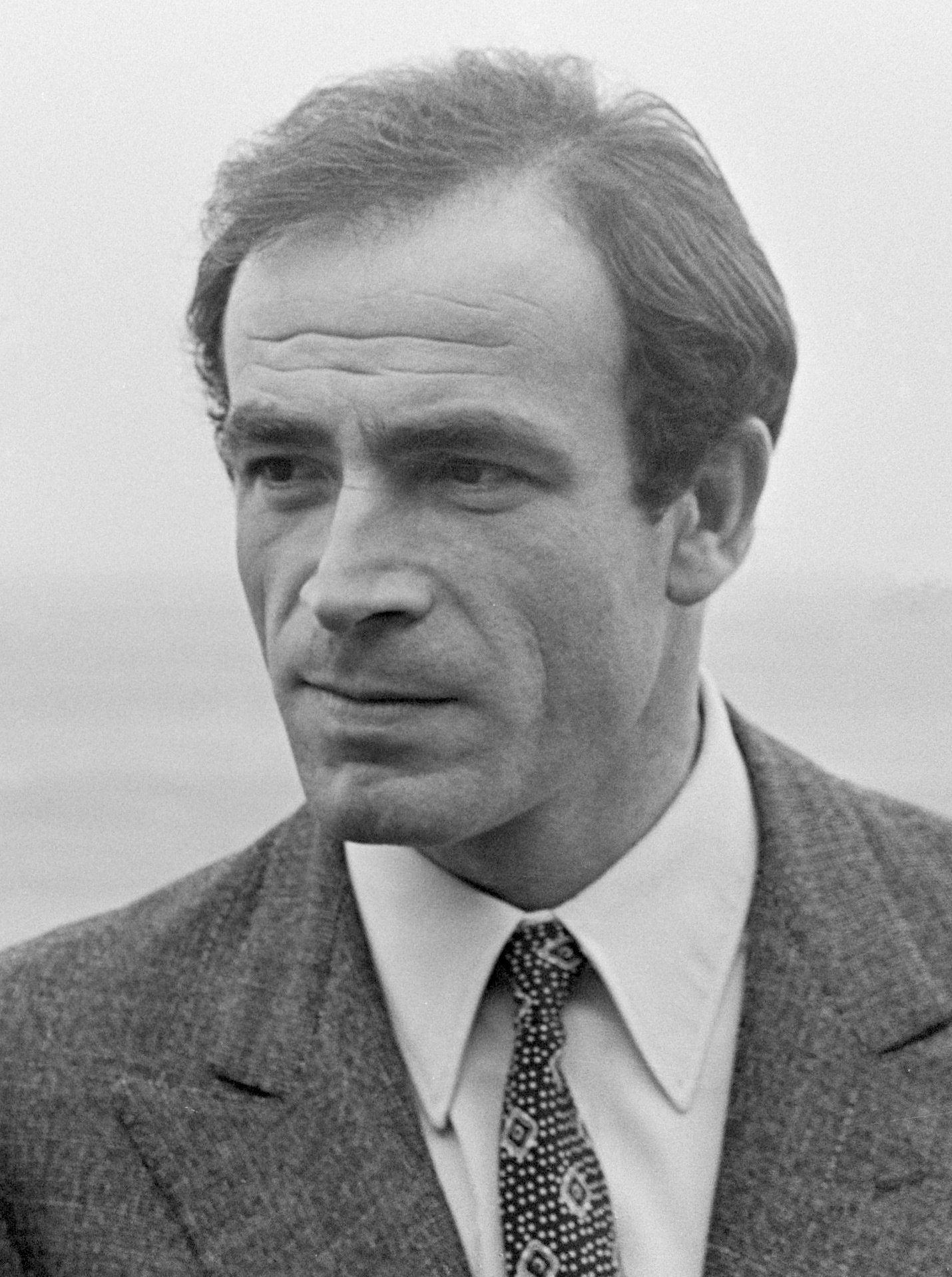
- Venantini in 1966
- Born: Enrico Venantino Venantini; 17 April 1930; Fabriano, Marche, Italy
- Died: 9 October 2018 (aged 88); Viterbo, Lazio, Italy
- Other names: Van Tenney; Vernon Vernons
- Education: Beaux-Arts de Paris
- Occupation: Actor
- Years active: 1954–2018
- Awards: Nastro d'Argento for Best Supporting Actor; 1999 The Dinner

Enrico Venantino Venantini (17 April 1930 – 9 October 2018) was an Italian actor. He is known internationally for his roles in several cult and exploitation films during the 1970s and 1980s, and was also a favorite of French director Georges Lautner. He won the Nastro d'Argento for Best Supporting Actor for The Dinner (1998).

== Early life ==
Venantini was born in Fabriano in 1930. He won a scholarship to study at the Beaux-Arts de Paris in France. To finance his studies, he took extra roles in films like Ben-Hur (1959), and worked as a translator at the American embassy in Rome. He moved to what Paris with what little money had had, driving a Lambretta scooter.

== Career ==
Venantini appeared in appeared in more than 190 films and television series. He made his debut in the cinema with an appearance in Un giorno in pretura under the direction of Steno and he had his first important role in Odissea Nuda (1961), directed by Franco Rossi.

He appeared in cult favorites such as Seven Deaths in the Cat's Eye (1973), Black Emanuelle (1975), City of the Living Dead (1980), The New Barbarians (1983), The Adventures of Hercules (1985), and Final Justice (1985). He acted with actors such as Louis de Funès, Bourvil, Lino Ventura, Yves Montand, Alain Delon and Gérard Depardieu and for directors such as Ettore Scola, Luciano Salce and Dino Risi and for French film directors such as Gérard Oury and Claude Lelouch. He was a particular favorite of French director Georges Lautner, with whom he worked on 10 films.

In 2017, Venantini was the subject of a retrospective at the Centro Sperimentale di Cinematografia, the national film school of Italy, which described him as "a multifaceted actor with a prolific and heterogeneous filmography".

== Personal life ==
Venantini was fluent in French and English, as well as his native Italian. He had two children, actor Luca Venantini (born 1970) and Victoria Venantini. He remained an avid painter throughout his life.

=== Death ===
Venantini died in Viterbo at the age of 88, on 9 October 2018, while recovering from surgery.

== Selected filmography ==
- A Day in Court (1954) – Ufficiale al varietà (uncredited)
- No Sun in Venice (1957)
- Ben Hur (1959) – Palefrenier de la course de chars (uncredited)
- Odissea nuda (1961) – Film Maker
- Pastasciutta nel deserto (1961) – Malapaga
- Warriors Five (1962) – Alberto
- The Captive City (1962) – Gen. Ferolou
- Les Tontons flingueurs (1963) – Pascal
- Il vuoto (1964) – Andrea Masi
- Salad by the Roots (1964) – Pierre Michon
- Le conseguenze (1964) – Valerio
- La Celestina P... R... (1965) – Carlo
- Le Corniaud (1965) – Mickey dit le bègue ou la souris
- The Agony and the Ecstasy (1965) – Paris De Grassis
- Galia (1966) – Greg
- Balearic Caper (1966) – Giuliano
- Le Grand Restaurant (1966) – Henrique
- La grande sauterelle (1967) – Vladimir
- Round Trip (1967) – Marc Daumel
- Bandidos (1967) – Billy Kane
- The Killer Likes Candy (1968) – Costa
- Love in the Night (1968) – Bollert
- Anzio (1968) – Capt. Burns
- Emma Hamilton (1968) – Le prince Carraciola
- The Libertine (1968) – Aurelio
- Hate Is My God (1969) – Sweetley
- Erotissimo (1969) – Sylvio
- Playgirl 70 (1969)
- The War Devils (1969) – Heinrich Meinike
- Are You Engaged to a Greek Sailor or an Airline Pilot? (1970) – Ministre
- The Priest's Wife (1970) – Maurizio
- Quella chiara notte d'ottobre (1970)
- Macédoine (1971) – Brian Goffy
- Laisse aller... c'est une valse (1971) – Tosca
- La araucana (1971) – Pedro de Valdivia
- Per amore o per forza (1971) – Padre di Jane
- Delusions of Grandeur (1971) – Del Basto
- Il était une fois un flic... (1972) – Felice – le tueur
- La rossa dalla pelle che scotta (1972)
- Le Rempart des béguines (1972) – Max
- Master of Love (1972) – Soldier from Sicily
- Seven Deaths in the Cat's Eye (1973) – Father Robertson
- Profession: Aventuriers (1973) – Pablo
- Number One (1973) – Rudy
- The Police Serve the Citizens? (1973) – Mancinelli
- Un modo di essere donna (1973) – Simone
- Lady Dynamite (1973) - Tommaso Russo
- The Magnificent Dare Devil (1973) – Piero Albertini
- Le führer en folie (1974) – Italian waiter / valet
- And Now My Love (1974) – Very Italian Italian Man
- Amore libero – Free Love (1974) – Chavad
- Black Emanuelle (1975) – William Meredith
- Emmanuelle 2 (1975) – The Polo Player
- Calore in provincia (1975) – Santuzzo
- Sex Diary (1976) – 'Bogart'
- Emanuelle in Bangkok (1976) – David
- A.A.A. cercasi spia... disposta spiare per conto spie (1976) – Roger, Capo della CIA
- Young, Violent, Dangerous (1976) – Sign. Morandi
- Il pomicione (1976) – Renato
- Nine Guests for a Crime (1977) – Walter
- Rene the Cane (1977) – Carlo
- L'altra metà del cielo (1977) – Mister Rickie
- La Bidonata (1977) – The Frenchman
- La bravata (1977) – Walter
- The Greatest Battle (1978) – Michael
- Emanuelle and the White Slave Trade (1978) – Giorgio Rivetti
- War of the Robots (1978) – Paul
- First Love (1978) – Emilio, TV channel owner
- La Cage aux Folles (1978) – Le chauffeur de Charrier
- The Concorde Affair (1979) – Forsythe
- Cop or Hood (1979) – Mario
- The Humanoid (1979)
- From Corleone to Brooklyn (1979) – Lt. Danova
- Gardenia (1979) – Nocita
- On est venu là pour s'éclater (1979) – Norbert
- Tre sotto il lenzuolo (1979)
- Riavanti... Marsch! (1979) – Sergeant Sconocchia
- Terror Express (1980) – Mike
- Sesso profondo (1980) – Mr. Murphy
- La terrazza (1980) – Un ospite
- Flatfoot in Egypt (1980) – Ruotolo
- Beast in Space (1980) – Juan Cardoso
- Lady Dynamite (1980)
- Cannibal Apocalypse (1980) – Lieutenant Hill (uncredited)
- Contraband (1980) – Captain Tarantino
- City of the Living Dead (1980) – Mr. Ross
- Cannibal Ferox (1981) – Sgt. Ross
- Longshot (1981) – Henri Bresson
- Giggi il bullo (1982) – Don Salvatore
- Sesso e volentieri (1982) – Man in the cinema
- Dio li fa poi li accoppia (1982) – Occhipinti
- The New Barbarians (1982) – Father Moses
- Exterminators of the Year 3000 (1983) – John
- Attention une femme peut en cacher une autre! (1983) – Nino
- Good King Dagobert (1984) – Demetrius, marchand
- Windsurf – Il vento nelle mani (1984) – Walter
- Ladyhawke (1985) – Bishop's Secretary
- Liberté, égalité, choucroute (1985) – Un sans culotte
- The Adventures of Hercules (1985) – High Priest
- The Assisi Underground (1985) – Pietro
- Final Justice (1985) – Joseph Palermo
- Sogni erotici di Cleopatra (1985) – Dolabella (uncredited)
- De flyvende djævle (1985) – Luigi
- The Lion's Share (1985) – Enzo Gatti
- The Repenter (1985)
- Aladdin (1986) – Puncher
- Capriccio (1987) – Alfredo
- Madame, nuda è arrivata la straniera (1989) – Fisher (uncredited)
- Vanille fraise (1989) – Anselmo
- The King's Whore (1990) – Luis de Arragon / Louis d'Aragon
- Crazy Underwear (1992) – Alessia's Father
- Madrugada de sangue (1992)
- Il respiro della valle (1992)
- Blu notte (1992) – Father
- Giovani e belli (1996) – Buby
- L'amico di Wang (1997) – Ezio
- The Eighteenth Angel (1997) – Clockmaker
- We'll Really Hurt You (1998) – Pietro
- The Dinner (1998)
- Toni (1999) – Minelli
- Livraison à domicile (2003) – Giuseppe, le père de Thomas
- Ho visto le stelle (2003) – Duilio Masera
- Atomik Circus – Le retour de James Bataille (2004) – Matt Kelso
- Could This Be Love? (2007) – Della Ponte
- I Always Wanted to Be a Gangster (2007) – Joe
- The Hideout (2007) – Telephone Installer
- Nos 18 ans (2008) – Marcello
- The Museum of Wonders (2010) – Master of Ceremonies
- 22 Bullets (2010) – Padovano
- Bloody Sin (2011) – Il prelato
- Hyde's Secret Nightmare (2011) – Barman
- Phantasmagoria (2014) – Grandpa (segment "My Gift to You")
- P.O.E. Pieces of Eldritch (P.O.E. 3) (2014)
- Papa lumière (2015) – Le gérant de l'hôtel
- Un plus une (2015) – Henri
- The Very Private Life of Mister Sim (2015) – Monsieur Matteotti père
- Marseille (2016) – Giovanni
- Vive la crise (2017) – Luigi Pirandello
- Maryline (2017) – Elio, le patron du restaurant
