= Black Emanuelle 2 =

- Directed by: Bitto Albertini (as Albert Thomas)
- Written by: Bitto Albertini; Mario Mariani
- Starring: Shulamith Lasri; Angelo Infanti
- Cinematography: Guglielmo Mancori
- Music by: Don Powell
- Release date: 31 July 1976
- Running time: 91 minutes
- Country: Italy
- Language: Italian

Black Emanuelle 2 (Italian: Emanuelle nera nº 2, also known as The New Black Emanuelle and Black Emanuelle No 2), is a 1976 Italian psychological drama-sexploitation film directed by Bitto Albertini. It is an unofficial sequel of Black Emanuelle.

== Background ==
Nominally a sequel to Albertini's successful 1975 sexploitation film Black Emanuelle, Black Emanuelle 2 differs greatly in plot. It stars Israeli actress Shulamith Lasri (in her sole film) as Emanuelle Richmond Morgan, a supermodel in a state of profound amnesia confined to a mental institution in New York City. Lasri credited as "Emanuelle Nera". The lead actor, as in the first film, is Angelo Infanti; he plays an entirely different character, however. The film was shot was variously shot in Rome, New York City and Venice.

== Plot ==
Emanuelle Richmond Morgan (Shulamith Lasri) is an African American supermodel married to basketball star Fred Morgan (Percy Hogan). She had visited Beirut in July 1976 and fell in the centre of the Lebanese Civil War. She has been going through a state of amnesia since then, kept at a mental institution in Manhattan. Dr. Paul Gardner (Angelo Infanti) who is in charge of the clinic takes a special interest in Richmond's case and begins to personally investigate her past, starting with the photographer John Farmer (Franco Cremonini) who was with her in Beirut.

== Cast ==
- Shulamith Lasri as Emanuelle Richmond Morgan (credited as Sharon Lesley)
- Angelo Infanti as Dr. Paul Gardner
- Percy Hogan as Fred Morgan
- Dagmar Lassander as Susan Gardner
- Danielle Ellison as Sharon, Paul's Niece
- Franco Cremonini as John Farmer
- Don Powell as Emanuelle's Father
- Pietro Torrisi as Simon
- Attilio Dottesio as The General

== Reception ==
The film was generally badly received by critics. According to Manlio Gomarasca, it has an "unattractive story", in which "it is not clear if the irony that winds throughout the film is voluntary or not". Film critic Paolo Mereghetti wrote that the film is "extremely poor", and her lead actress has "generous shapes but a rare inexpressiveness". In its DVD Talk review, it is described as "flat, tedious and barely thrilling" and as "a relatively daft and boring entry into the cycle". In his DVD Verdict review, Daryl Loomis wrote that the film is "mind-numbingly dull and looks like a grouping of unconnected scenes".

== See also ==
- List of Italian films of 1976
