= Emanuelle Around the World =

- Directed by: Joe D'Amato
- Screenplay by: Maria Pia Fusco; Gianfranco Clerici
- Story by: Maria Pia Fusco
- Produced by: Fabrizio De Angelis
- Starring: Laura Gemser; Ivan Rassimov; Karin Schubert
- Cinematography: Joe D'Amato
- Edited by: Vincenzo Tomassi
- Music by: Nico Fidenco
- Production company: Embassy Productions
- Distributed by: Fida Cinematografica
- Release date: 1977
- Country: Italy
- Language: Italian

Emanuelle Around the World (Italian: Emanuelle – Perché violenza alle donne?, also known as Confessions of Emanuelle) is a 1977 sexploitation directed by Joe D'Amato. The film stars Laura Gemser and George Eastman, Karin Schubert and Ivan Rassimov.

== Plot ==
After meeting United Nations diplomat Dr. Robertson in New York City, journalist Emanuelle is invited to India to write a report on Guru Shanti, a man who claims to have achieved the ultimate orgasm. Once there she engages in a variety of sex acts, including one with the Guru, disproving his theory. She then heads to Hong Kong to investigate trafficked women and witnesses them being subjected to forced bestiality. Upon her return to San Francisco in the United States, by way of Italy, she teams up with fellow reporter Cora Norman. The two snoop out a trail of men smuggling women to the Middle East, involving members of the United States government.

== Cast ==
- Laura Gemser as Emanuelle
- Ivan Rassimov as Dr. Robertson
- Karin Schubert as Cora Norman
- Don Powell as Jeff Davis
- George Eastman as Guru Shanti
- Brigitte Petronio as Mary
- Marino Masè as Kassem
- Gianni Macchia as Emiro

== Release ==
Emanuelle Around the World was released in 1977. Two versions of the film exist with each having different degrees of pornographic content.

== Reception ==
From a contemporary review, Richard Combs of the Monthly Film Bulletin reviewed an 88-minute dubbed version of the film. Combs stated that "in terms of production values, this is easily [Emanuelle]'s most elaborate outing yet." Combs continued that the film's plot was "jettisoned as unnecessary baggage, and various episodes might have been concocted on an ad hoc basis in each of the glamour spots visited."
