= Chai Lee =

Chinese actress (active 1970s – 1990s)

- Born: Canton, China
- Occupation: Actress
- Years active: 1970s – 1990s

Chai Lee is an actress, born in Canton, China.

She is best known for her appearances in British films and television, particularly her uncredited role as a Moonbase Alpha operative in the science fiction series Space 1999, as Esther in The Professionals and her performance in the crime drama Gangsters, as Lily Li Tang.

Her other TV appearances include The Benny Hill Show, Angels and as Suki in the "Tomkinson's Schooldays" episode ofRipping Yarns.

Her film credits include Yellow Emanuelle, Queen Kong and The Great Muppet Caper. Lee also makes an appearance in the 1981 James Bond film For Your Eyes Only.

== Roles ==
In Yellow Emanuelle (1977) Lee played Dr. Emy Wong, and in Queen Kong (1976) she appeared as a native girl. In For Your Eyes Only (1981) she was an uncredited girl at the pool, and in The Great Muppet Caper (1981) she appeared as a model. She also played Lee-Ping in the 1973 martial-arts comedy Mr. Hercules Against Karate.

On television, she appeared in a 1973 episode of The Benny Hill Show ("Jackie Wright's Holiday") and in the 1980 The Professionals episode "Take Away".
