= Haydée Politoff =

Russian-French actress (born 1946)

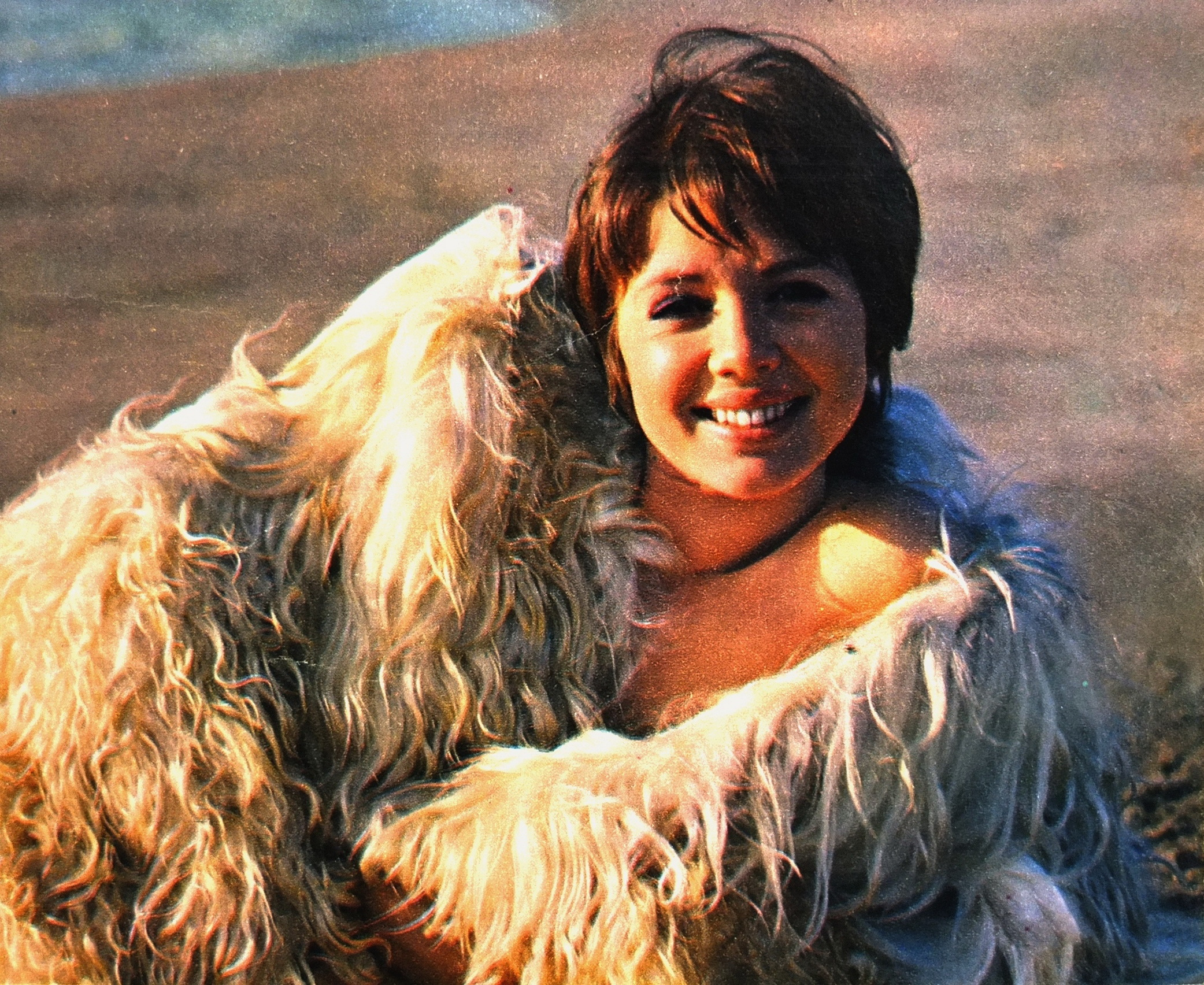
- Politoff in April 1970
- Born: May 25, 1946 (age 80); Saint-Denis, France
- Occupations: Actress, screenwriter

Haydée Politoff (born 1946) is a retired Russian-French actress.

Politoff moved to the United States in the late 1970s, retired from acting, and resided in California.

"La Collectionneuse ended in Saint-Tropez. Just then the actress (Haydée Politoff) went to Italy and became a movie star for ten years and then married a British rock star and moved to San Francisco and may be living in America now, somewhere around Big Sur." — Patrick Bauchau

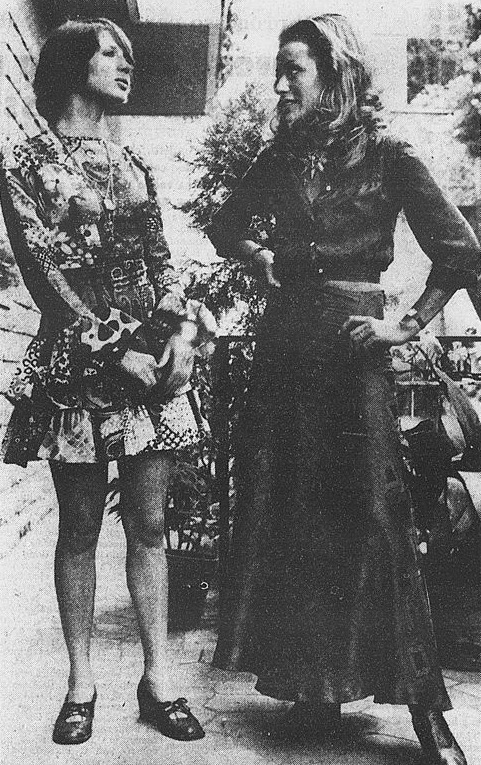
Haydée Politoff and Silvia Monti, in Rome, 16 June 1970, in it:La Stampa, N. 121, p. 7

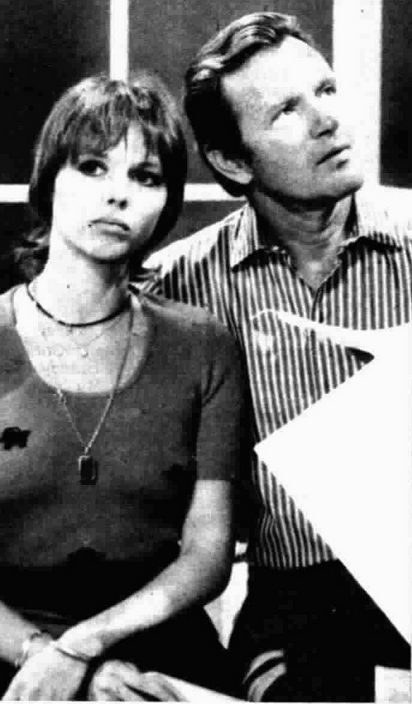
Haydée Politoff and Jacques Sernas, in Italy, presenting En Français, 20 January 1974, on RAI, in it:Radiocorriere, N. 4, year LI, p.43

== Filmography ==
- 1966 : La Collectionneuse de Éric Rohmer
- 1967 : Ne jouez pas avec les Martiens de Henri Lanoë
- 1968 : Bora Bora de Ugo Liberatore
- 1968 : Love Problems de Giuliano Biagetti
- 1968 : The Young Wolves de Marcel Carné
- 1969 : Check to the Queen de Pasquale Festa Campanile
- 1969 : Interrabang de Giuliano Biagetti
- 1970 : Secret intentions de Antonio Eceiza
- 1970 : Queens of Evil de Tonino Cervi
- 1972 : La Vergine di Bali de Guido Zurli
- 1972 : Hector the Mighty de Enzo G. Castellari
- 1972 : Love in the Afternoon de Éric Rohmer
- 1973 : The Funny Face of the Godfather de Franco Prosperi
- 1974 : El gran amor del conde Drácula (Count Dracula's Great Love)
- 1975 : La Guerre des otages de Edward Dmytryk
- 1979 : The Crying Woman de Jacques Doillon
- 1981 : Il cappotto di legno de Gianni Manera
- 2018 : Rendezvous in Chicago by Michael Glover Smith
