= Berto Pisano =

Italian composer

- Born: 13 October 1928; Cagliari, Italy
- Died: 29 January 2002 (aged 73); Rome, Italy

Berto Pisano (born Umberto Pisano, Cagliari, 13 October 1928 – Rome, 29 January 2002) was an Italian composer, conductor, arranger and jazz musician.

Born in Cagliari, Sardinia, Pisano started his career as a double bassist in the jazz groups Quartetto Astor and Asternovas. He later learned to play the trumpet. He is best known as a song writer for Italian pop star Mina and his work as film composer. In 1974, Pisano's composition "A Blue Shadow", the theme from the RAI TV-series Ho incontrato un'ombra, topped the Italian charts.

== Selected filmography ==
Year	Film	Directed by	Singles	Latest CD / Digital Release
1963	Katarsis	Giuseppe Vegezzi		
1963	A Game Of Crime	Romano Ferrara		Kutmusic / KV015 / 2020
1966	The Big Blackout	Luigi Capuano		
1966	La spia che viene dal mare	Lamberto Benvenuti		Four Flies / Digital / 2022
1967	The Crazy Kids of the War	Steno		
1967	Django Kills Softly	Massimo Pupillo	Interrecord I-NP1015: Chi Non E`Con Te / La Banda DI El Santo	Four Flies / Digital / 2022
1968	Dismissed on His Wedding Night	Ugo Tognazzi		Verita Note / VQCD-10028 / 2006
1968	Superargo and the Faceless Giants	Paolo Bianchini		
1968	Day After Tomorrow	Nick Nostro		GDM / GDM 2067 / 2006
1969	Interrabang	Giuliano Biagetti	RCA Original Cast OC 15: Il Colore Degli Angeli / ... E Il Sole Scotta	GDM / CD CLUB 7025 / 2004
1971	Kill! Kill! Kill! Kill!	Romain Gary	Orchard Strike: To Jean (3:08) / Kill Them All (4:20)	Rambling Records / RBCP-2950 / 2015
1972	Decameron II	Mino Guerrini		
1972	Arcana	Giulio Questi		
1972	Naughty Nun	Mariano Laurenti		
1973	Ancora una volta prima di lasciarci	Giuliano Biagetti		Four Flies / Digital / 2022
1973	Death Smiles at a Murderer	Joe D'Amato		Digitmovies / CDDM066 / 2006
1973	Il sergente Rompiglioni	Pier Giorgio Ferretti		
1974	Ho incontrato un'ombra	Daniele D'Anza	A blue shadow	
1974	La svergognata	Giuliano Biagetti		Digitmovies / CDDM309 / 2020
1975	Strip Nude for Your Killer	Andrea Bianchi		
1975	La novizia	Pier Giorgio Ferretti		Four Flies Records / FLIES53CD / 2022
1975	La traccia verde	Silvio Maestranzi	Ricordi SRL 10779: Flowers / Grey Moustache	
1976	Donna... cosa si fa per te	Giuliano Biagetti		
1977	L'appuntamento	Giuliano Biagetti		
1977	Naughty Teen	Andrea Bianchi		
1979	Where Can You Go Without the Little Vice?	Franco Martinelli	Duse Record BTF 116: Tic Nervoso / Tic Nervoso (Strumentale)	Beat Records Company / DDJ012 / 2011
1979	Giallo a Venezia	Mario Landi		
1980	Patrick Still Lives	Mario Landi		
1981	A Policewoman in New York	Michele Massimo Tarantini		
1981	Pierino contro tutti	Marino Girolami		Cometa Edizioni Musicali / CMT 10030 / 2012
1981	Burial Ground: The Nights of Terror	Andrea Bianchi		
1982	Pierino colpisce ancora	Marino Girolami		Cometa Edizioni Musicali / CMT 10030 / 2012
