= Enzo Liberti =

Italian actor (1926–1986)

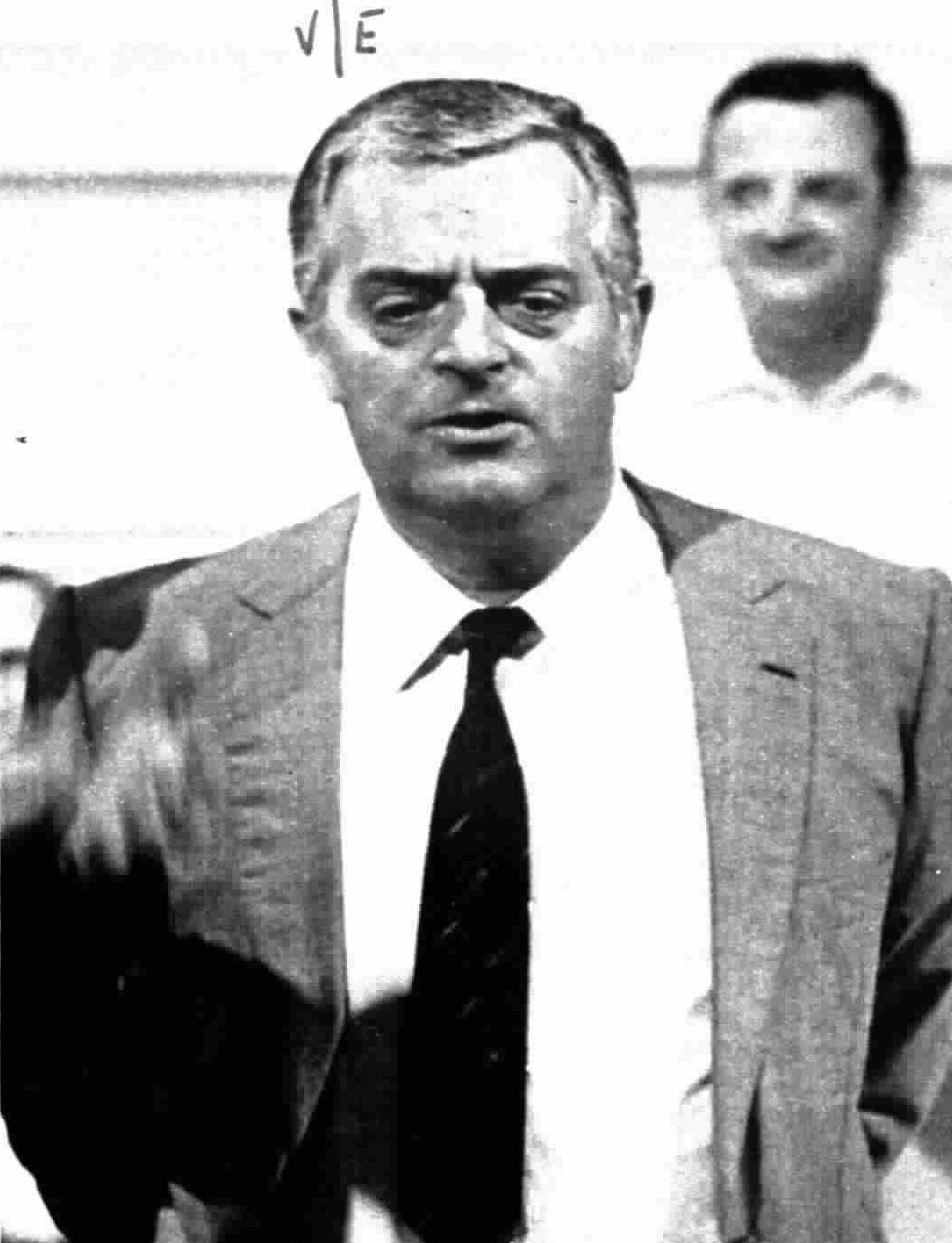
- Liberti in 1974
- Born: Vincenzo Liberti; 20 April 1926; Rome, Kingdom of Italy
- Died: 4 May 1986 (aged 60); Saint-Laurent-du-Var, France
- Occupations: Actor; voice actor; director; television personality
- Years active: 1950–1986
- Spouse: Leila Durante

Vincenzo "Enzo" Liberti (20 April 1926 – 4 May 1986) was an Italian actor, voice actor, director and television personality.

== Biography ==
Born in Rome, after having been a diplomatic courier for the Foreign Ministry, he began his artistic career immediately after the Second World War as a stage actor, especially in comedy plays in Romanesco dialect; he mostly acted along with his wife Leila Durante and her parents Checco and Anita at the Teatro Rossini in Rome. A character actor in many films, he played the lead roles in his two films as a director, in 1954 and in 1955. Liberti was also very active on television, as a sidekick of Raimondo Vianello in several variety shows and as an actor in television films and series.

== Death ==
Liberti died at age 60 in a clinic in Saint–Laurent–du–Var, near Nice, where he underwent surgery on his heart.

== Filmography ==
=== Film ===
- If You Won a Hundred Million (1954, directed by Carlo Campogalliani and Carlo Moscovini) – Pierino (segment "Il promesso... sposato")
- Carmen di Trastevere (1962, directed by Carmine Gallone) – Vincenzo's Fat Accomplice
- Made in Italy (1965, directed by Nanni Loy) – The Lawyer's Secretary (segment "2 'Il Lavoro', episode 2")
- Soldati e capelloni (1967, directed by Ettore Maria Fizzarotti) – Il maggiore
- Non cantare, spara (1968, directed by Daniele D'Anza)
- Naked Violence (1969, directed by Fernando Di Leo) – Luigi
- Oh dolci baci e languide carezze (1969, directed by Mino Guerrini)
- Bella di giorno, moglie di notte (1971, directed by Nello Rossati) – Police superintendent
- Dirty Weekend (1973, directed by Dino Risi) – Barbieri, TV Journalist
- The Police Serve the Citizens? (1973, directed by Enzo G. Castellari) – Fruttivendolo
- Buona parte di Paolina (1973, directed by Nello Rossati)
- Morbosità (1974, directed by Luigi Russo) – Amilcare l'assessore
- I sette magnifici cornuti (1974, directed by Luigi Russo) – Evaristo
- Due sul pianerottolo (1975, directed by Mario Amendola) – Il brigadiere Icardi
- Donna… cosa si fa per te (1976, directed by Giuliano Biagetti) – Man from Rome
- Colpita da improvviso benessere (1976, directed by Franco Giraldi)
- Taxi Girl (1977, directed by Michele Massimo Tarantini) – Marcella's dad
- L'appuntamento (1977, directed by Giuliano Biagetti)
- Liquirizia (1979, directed by Salvatore Samperi) – Fulvio's father (as Vincenzo Liberti)
- Assassinio sul Tevere (1979, directed by Bruno Corbucci) – Otello 'Er Pinna' Santi
- Ciao marziano (1980, directed by Pier Francesco Pingitore) – Il dottore
- Pierino contro tutti (1981, directed by Marino Girolami) – Aristide – padre di Pierino
- I carabbimatti (1981, directed by Giuliano Carnimeo) – Capo Infermiere
- Il paramedico (1982, directed by Sergio Nasca) – Portiere dello stabile
- Pierino colpisce ancora (1982, directed by Marino Girolami) – Aristide – padre di Pierino
- My Darling, My Dearest (1982, directed by Sergio Corbucci) – Commendatore
- Vacanze in America (1984, directed by Carlo Vanzina)

=== Television ===
- Le inchieste del commissario Maigret (1968, directed by Mario Landi) – L'autista Edgard
- Astronave Terra (1971, directed by Alberto Negrin) – Direttore del New Yorker
- Prima, durante e dopo la partita (1972, directed by Gian Domenico Giagni)
- Qui squadra mobile (1973, directed by Anton Giulio Majano) – Portiere
- Tante scuse (1974, directed by Romolo Siena)
- Diagnosi (1975, directed by Mario Caiano) – Lazzari
- Di nuovo tante scuse (1975–1976, directed by Romolo Siena)
- Due ragazzi incorreggibili (1976, directed by Romolo Siena)
- Il commissario De Vincenzi 2 (1977, directed by Mario Ferrero) – Vetturino
- Noi... no! (1977–1978, directed by Romolo Siena)
- Attenti a noi due (1983)
- Zig zag (1983–1986)

=== As director ===
- Il porto della speranza (anche fotografia e sceneggiatura) (1954)
- Processo all'amore (anche soggetto sceneggiatura) (1955)
