= Apache Woman =

Apache Woman may refer to:

- Apache Woman (1955 film), an American Western directed by Roger Corman
- Apache Woman (1976 film), an Italian Spaghetti Western film
