= Pierre Blaise =

French actor

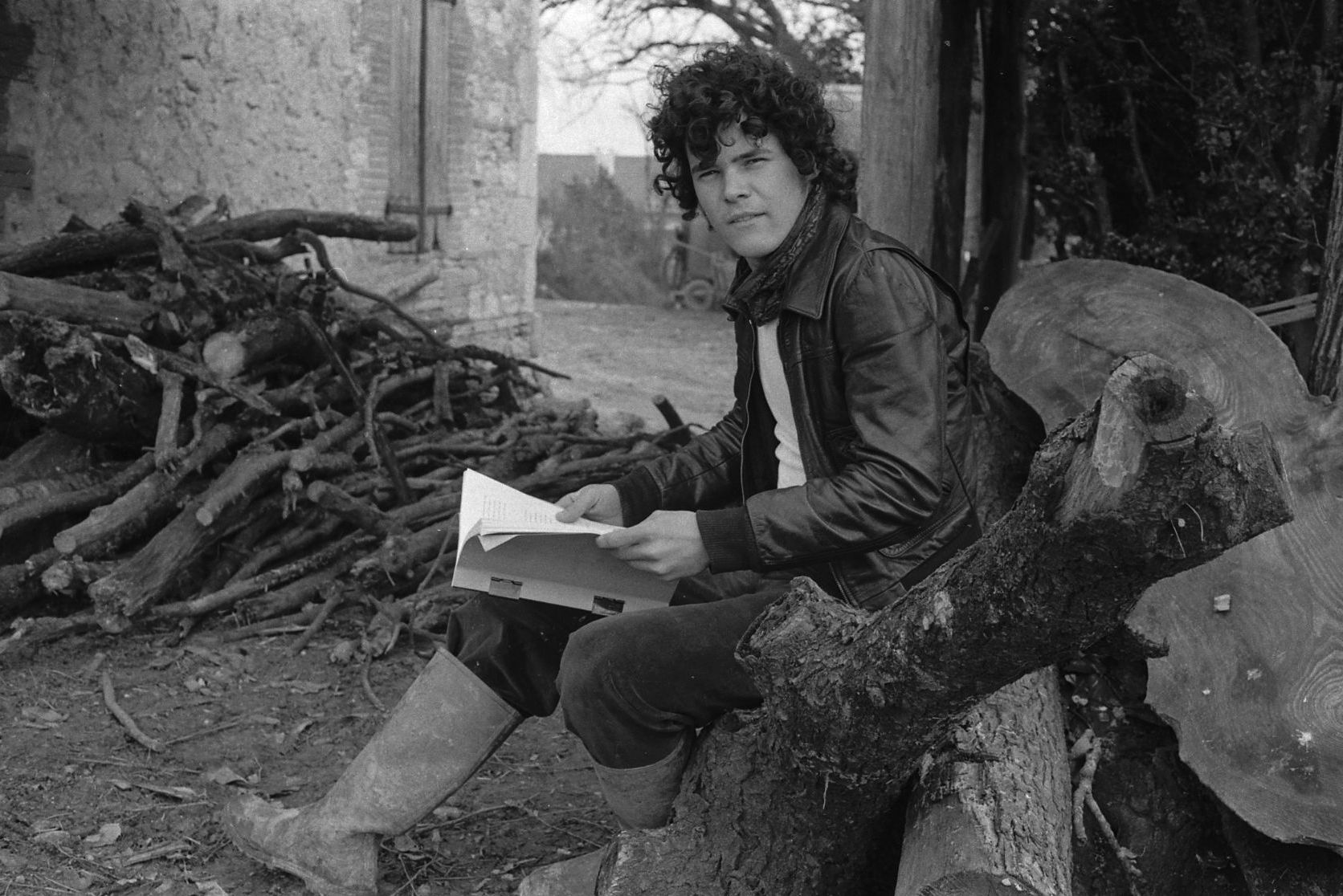
- Blaise in Lacombe, Lucien
- Born: Pierre-Marc Blaise; 11 June 1955; Moissac, France
- Died: 31 August 1975 (aged 20); Moissac, France
- Occupation: Actor
- Years active: 1974–1975

Pierre-Marc Blaise (11 June 1955 – 31 August 1975) was a French film actor. He is best known for the role of Lucien Lacombe in Louis Malle's 1974 film Lacombe, Lucien. An amateur selected for Malle's film, Blaise went on to act in three additional films, The Big Delirium, The Porcelain Anniversary, and Down the Ancient Staircase, all released in 1975. His career was cut short when he was killed in a car crash in 1975.

== Life and career ==
Blaise was born in Moissac, France.

Blaise made his acting debut in Louis Malle's 1974 film Lacombe, Lucien. Malle had been looking for a non-actor to play the titular character in Lacombe, Lucien and was convinced that Blaise, then working as a woodcutter, would bring great authenticity to the role. (Writing of the film in 1977, Current Biography referred to Blaise as a "real-life Provençal farm boy.") In winning the role, Blaise was chosen over 1,000 other actors. Following his appearance in Malle's film, Blaise acted in three films, The Big Delirium, The Porcelain Anniversary, and Down the Ancient Staircase, all released in 1975.

A year after Lacombe, Lucien was released, Blaise was killed at the age of 20 in a car crash. Following a party, he was driving a car, a Renault 15 TL he had purchased with funds from his acting work. Accompanied by two friends he had brought along for company, Blaise lost control and crashed against a plane tree on the route de Laujol between Moissac and Durfort-Lacapelette, where he lived with his parents. His friends were also killed. According to Newsweek, the accident took place after the vehicle "skidded around a curve in pouring rain". Blaise is buried in the cemetery of Durfort-Lacapelette in Tarn-et-Garonne.

== Filmography ==
- 1974, Lacombe, Lucien. Directed by Louis Malle.
- 1975, The Big Delirium. Directed by Dennis Berry.
- 1975, The Porcelain Anniversary. Directed by Roger Coggio.
- 1975, Down the Ancient Staircase. Directed by Mauro Bolognini.

== Bibliography ==
- Malle, Louis. Malle on Malle. London: Faber, 1993.
