= Count Dracula's Great Love =

- Spanish theatrical release poster
- Directed by: Javier Aguirre
- Written by: Paul Naschy; Javier Aguirre; Alberto S. Insua
- Produced by: Francisco Lara Polop; Manuel Leguinche
- Starring: Paul Naschy; Haydée Politoff; Rosanna Yanni; Mirta Miller; Victor Alcazar; Ingrid Garbo
- Cinematography: Raúl Pérez Cubero
- Edited by: Petra de Nieva
- Music by: Carmelo A. Bernaola
- Production companies: Janus Films; Eva Film; Marsk Associates; Motion Picture Marketing
- Release date: 12 May 1973 (Spain)
- Country: Spain
- Language: Spanish
- Box office: $1,200,000

Count Dracula's Great Love (Spanish: El gran amor del conde Drácula) is a 1973 Spanish film directed by Javier Aguirre, and starring Paul Naschy as Count Dracula. The film also features Rosanna Yanni, Haydee Politoff (whom Naschy did not like working with), Mirta Miller and Ingrid Garbo.

The film was shot in 1972, but took about a year to be released anywhere. It first premiered in April 1973 at the Paris Festival of Fantastic Films, along with Naschy's Hunchback of the Morgue, and then was released in Spain on 12 May 1973. It was released to U.S. theaters in March 1974 as Dracula's Great Love (on a double bill with The Vampires Night Orgy), then re-released later in 1979 by Motion Picture Marketing under the title Cemetery Girls (the poster emphasizing the film's adult content and indicating nothing of its star Paul Naschy or Spanish origin). Contrary to some sources, this film was never released under the titles Vampire Playgirls or Graveyard Tramps; these were other films retitled by MPM which were often paired with Cemetery Girls in drive-ins.

The film was released (heavily edited) in the U.K. on 8 August 1974 as Dracula's Virgin Lovers, double-billed with Venom (aka The Legend of Spider Forest). The running time in England was cut from 83 minutes to only 66 minutes. The film was released in Italy as The Diabolical Loves of Nosferatu, in Thailand as Virgin Lovers, and in Mexico as The Orgy of Dracula.

The film has been released uncut on Blu-ray by Vinegar Syndrome.

== Plot ==
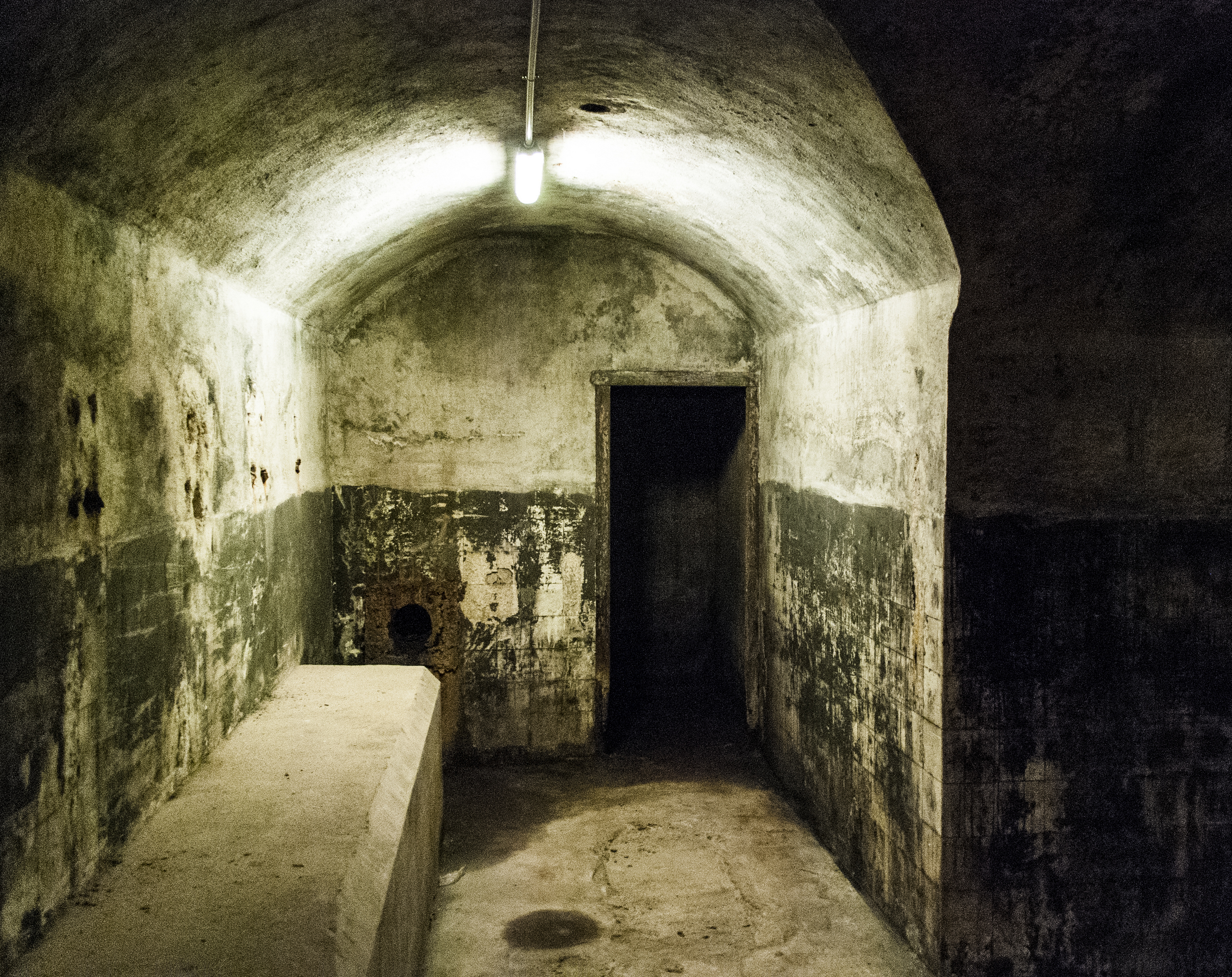
Even after restoration, Posición Jaca, the bunker under Parque del Capricho in Madrid, still has remnants of the black paint that was spread during the filming.

Count Dracula's Great Love opens outside a creepy old sanitorium in the Carpathian Mountains as two delivery men arrive with a large, heavy man-shaped crate. The owner, Doctor Wendell Marlowe (Paul Naschy), has just purchased the sanitorium, but has not yet moved in. Realizing that these rich castle-owning types have money and jewels just lying around, they decide to wander about and see if there is anything they can steal. One is struck in the head with an ax and the other gets his throat ripped out by a man in a black cape with velvet lining.

Meanwhile, a stagecoach loaded with four beautiful young women - Karen (Haydee Politoff), Senta (Rosanna Yanni), Marlene (Ingrid Garbo), and Elke (Mirta Miller) and their friend Imre Polvi (Vic Winner), a strapping young male, loses a carriage wheel while traveling through the infamous Borgo Pass. When the stagecoach driver is killed in a freak accident, the five passengers seek shelter from an oncoming storm in the nearby sanitorium, where they are welcomed by Doctor Marlowe. Their host invites them into his home and lets them stay for as long as they need to.

Of course, Marlowe is really Count Dracula. It is not before long that the new guests are bitten one by one, composing Dracula's new army of the undead - save for the virginal Karen. Dracula seeks the rebirth of his daughter Radna and in order to bring about her resurrection, Dracula must complete a blood ritual and convince Karen to voluntarily join him as his immortal bride in eternal darkness.

He seduces all of the girls but Karen, and then chains them in his dungeon. At the end of the film, he kills them by exposing them to sunlight. When he seduces Karen, he knows he has found true love. He tells Karen that he loves her and he cannot go through with the ritual. Karen rejects his offer to become one of the living dead, so he commits suicide by thrusting a wooden stake into his own heart and before he dies, he utters her name.

== Cast ==
- Paul Naschy dual role as Count Dracula / Dr. Wendell Marlowe
- Rosanna Yanni as Senta
- Haydée Politoff as Karen
- Mirta Miller as Elke
- Ingrid Garbo as Marlene
- Víctor Alcázar as Imre Polvi
- José Manuel Martín as 1st hired hand
- Álvaro de Luna as 2nd hired hand
- Julia Peña as peasant woman
- Susana Latour as victim in Karen's dream - image in negative
- Loreta Tovar - female victim in bed
- Benito Pavón
- Leandro San José

== Production ==
The shoot was plagued with problems. A car accident on a windy mountain road resulted in a head injury for Haydee Politoff, crew members were injured when some scenery collapsed on them, and a chemical used in the special effects scenes turned out to be toxic and seriously sickened both Ingrid Garbo and Mirta Miller. While Politoff recovered from her head injury, Naschy and Aguirre temporarily halted all work on the film and in the meantime commenced work on their next project together, The Hunchback of the Morgue. By the time she was back at work they had completely finished filming Hunchback, and immediately returned to work on Count Dracula.

The underground cellars in the film were shot in an old bunker under the Parque de el Capricho in Madrid, which used to serve as the headquarters for the Republican Army during the Spanish Civil War.
