= Il sergente Rompiglioni =

- Directed by: Pier Giorgio Ferretti
- Written by: Roberto Gianviti; Fiorenzo Fiorentini
- Cinematography: Sergio Rubini
- Music by: Berto Pisano
- Distributed by: Variety Distribution
- Release date: 1973
- Country: Italy
- Language: Italian

Il sergente Rompiglioni ("Sergeant Rompiglioni") is a 1973 Italian comedy film directed by Giuliano Biagetti (here credited Pier Giorgio Ferretti). The film got a great commercial success, grossing over one billion lire. It was the greatest commercial success of Franco Franchi in his solo career after the split from Ciccio Ingrassia. The film has a sequel, Il sergente Rompiglioni diventa... caporale, still starring Franchi in the title role.

== Cast ==
- Franco Franchi: Sgt. Francesco Garibaldi Rompiglioni
- Francesca Romana Coluzzi: Semiramide
- Mario Carotenuto: Colonel Guglielmo
- Corinne Cléry: The daughter of the Colonel (credited as Corinne Picolo)
- Enzo Andronico: The Lieutenant
- Nino Terzo: Lance Corporal Baffo
