= Rendezvous in Chicago =

2018 film, directed by Michael Glover Smith

- theatrical release poster
- Directed by: Michael Glover Smith
- Written by: Michael Glover Smith
- Produced by: Layne Marie Williams
- Starring: Clare Cooney; Kevin Wehby; Rashaad Hall; Matthew Sherbach; Nina Ganet; Shane Simmons
- Cinematography: Alex Halstead
- Edited by: Eric Marsh
- Distributed by: Questar Entertainment
- Release date: October 19, 2018 (Adirondack Film Festival)
- Running time: 69 minutes
- Country: United States
- Language: English

Rendezvous in Chicago is a 2018 American romantic comedy film written and directed by Michael Glover Smith. The film consists of three vignettes that examine Chicago couples at different stages in their relationships. The film premiered at the 2018 Adirondack Film Festival in Glens Falls, New York where it won second place in Audience Choice voting. It is notable for containing a cameo by French actress Haydée Politoff (La Collectionneuse), her first screen appearance in 37 years.

== Plot ==
Rendezvous in Chicago is composed of three vignettes corresponding to the beginning, middle and end stages of a relationship: Paul, a charming young man, attempts to pick up Delaney, a bookish grad student, in an otherwise empty wine bar. Rob and Andy are enjoying the bliss of newly formed couplehood. Julie comes home from work early to find her boyfriend, Wyatt, in bed with another woman.

== Background and production ==
According to an interview with PBS Wisconsin, Smith said the first idea he had for the film was its climactic fourth wall-breaking moment: "Whenever I watch movies, I always feel like I'm falling in love with somebody on screen...At a certain point, I wondered, 'Why does the person onscreen never fall back in love with me?'...That sort of led naturally to the question, 'Well, if that were to happen, if the character onscreen were to start flirting with me as a viewer, what would that look like? How could that happen?'"

The film was shot in eight days on a budget of $20,000.

== Cast ==
- Clare Cooney as Delaney
- Kevin Wehby as Paul
- Rashaad Hall as Andy
- Matthew Sherbach as Rob
- Nina Ganet as Julie
- Shane Simmons as Wyatt
- Haydée Politoff as Dr. Scherer

== Release ==
Among the film's theatrical screenings: Spectacle Theater in Brooklyn, the Gene Siskel Film Center in Chicago, the Maple Theater in Detroit, and more than a dozen film festival screenings across the United States including the Buffalo International Film Festival, the Beloit International Film Festival, the Santa Fe Film Festival, the George Lindsey UNA Film Festival (where it won the award for Best Comedy) and the Tallahassee Film Festival (where it won the Audience Favorite award for Best Feature).

=== Home Video ===
Questar Entertainment announced acquisition of streaming/VOD rights to the film in November 2019.

== Reception ==
Rendezvous in Chicago has received very positive reviews for its writing, acting, and directing. This includes a three-and-a-half (out of four) star review by the Chicago Sun-Times' Richard Roeper who called it "exhilaratingly entertaining", a Newcity Chicago review that compared it to the work of Éric Rohmer and Arnaud Desplechin, and a review in Film Threat that cited Nina Ganet as giving the film's standout performance. As of May 2021, Rotten Tomatoes shows an approval rating of 90%, based on ten reviews.

== See also ==
- Rendezvous in Paris
