= Corrado Pani =

Italian actor and voice actor (1936–2005)

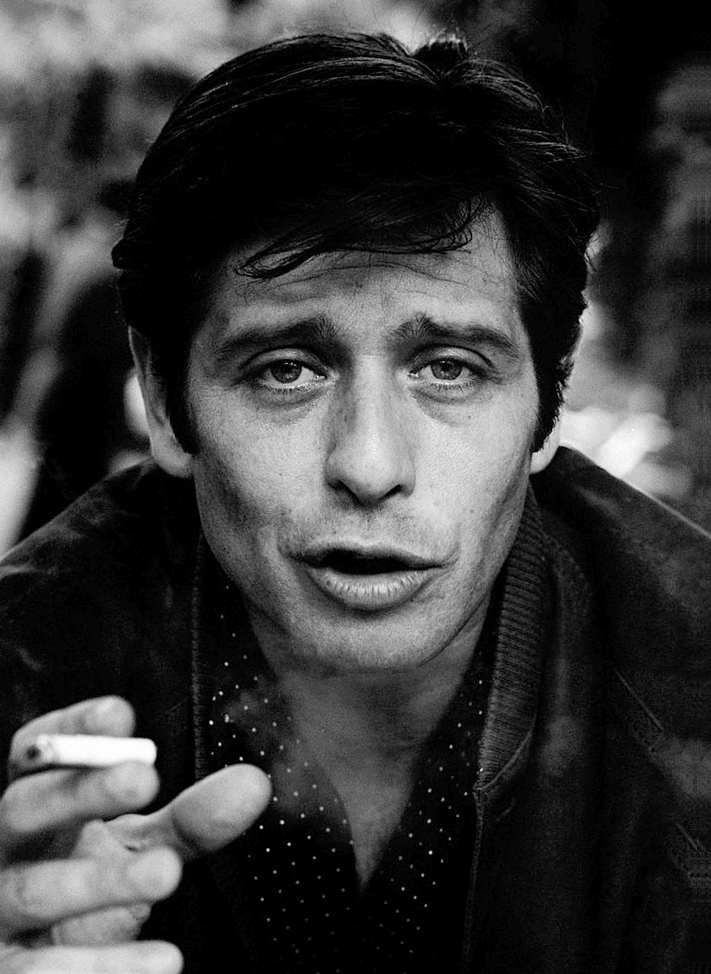
- Corrado Pani in 1968
- Born: 4 March 1936; Rome, Italy
- Died: 2 March 2005 (aged 68); Rome, Italy
- Occupation: Actor
- Partner: Mina (1962–1965)
- Children: Massimiliano

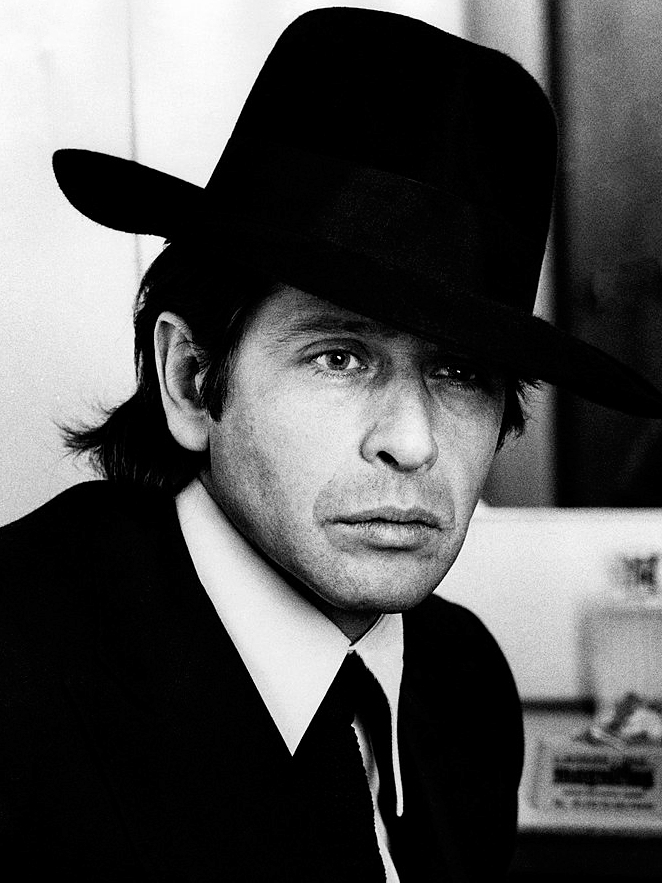
Corrado Pani in 1973

Corrado Pani (4 March 1936 – 2 March 2005) was an Italian actor and voice actor.

== Life and career ==
Born in Rome, Pani began his career playing the role of Jesus as a child in a Radio Vaticana radio drama. He made his film debut in 1953, with a minor role in Dino Risi's Il viale della speranza. In 1955 he had first major theatrical role, in Thè e simpatia. He later worked on stage with Luchino Visconti, Giorgio Strehler, Krzysztof Zanussi and Luca Ronconi, among others.

Pani appeared in about fifty films; his last role was the judge in Roberto Benigni's Pinocchio (2002). He was also a television actor and a voice actor. In the 1960s, Pani had a long love affair with the singer Mina and in 1963 the couple had a son, Massimiliano.

== Partial filmography ==
- Doctor Antonio (1954)
- Il viale della speranza (1953) – Roberto Franzi
- Vacation with a Gangster (1954) – Gianni (voice, uncredited)
- Terrore sulla città (1957)
- White Nights (1957) – Un giovinastro
- I dritti (1957) – Aldo
- A sud niente di nuovo (1957) – Dick
- Città di notte (1958) – Paolo Prandi
- Herod the Great (1959) – Antipatro / Herodes Antipas
- Le notti dei Teddy Boys (1959) – Constantino
- Guardatele ma non toccatele (1959) – Claudio, l'aviere
- Genitori in blue-jeans (1960) – Giorgio
- Call Girls of Rome (1960) – Un giovane ricattatore
- Under Ten Flags (1960) – Marinaio tedesco
- Il peccato degli anni verdi (1960) – Augusto d'Aquino
- Rocco and His Brothers (1960) – Ivo
- Run with the Devil (1960) – Giulio Nardi
- Cleopatra's Daughter (1960) – Pharaoh Nemorat / Keops
- Girl with a Suitcase (1961) – Marcello Fainardi
- Amazons of Rome (1961) – Muzio Scevola
- A Day for Lionhearts (1961) – Mortati
- La monaca di Monza (1962) – Molteno
- A Queen for Caesar (1962) – Ptolemaio
- Whisky a mezzogiorno (1962)
- Bora Bora (1968) – Roberto Ferrio
- Interrabang (1969) – Marco
- Matalo! (1970) – Bart
- Gli ordini sono ordini (1972) – Gangster
- Testa in giù, gambe in aria (1972) – Andrea
- Anna: the Pleasure, the Torment (1973) – Guido Salvi
- La notte dell'ultimo giorno (1973) – Sandro
- Ancora una volta prima di lasciarci (1973) – Giorgio
- La minorenne (1974) – Spartaco, the artist
- Gambling City (1974) – Pio Naldi
- Drama of the Rich (1975) – Corrado
- Lips of Lurid Blue (1975) – Marco Alessi
- Watch Me When I Kill (1977) – Lukas
- Dove volano i corvi d'argento (1977) – Istevene
- Francesca è mia (1986) – Andrea
- 'O Re (1988) – General Coviello
- Pinocchio (2002) – Judge
