= La svergognata =

1974 film

- Directed by: Giuliano Biagetti
- Written by: Giuliano Biagetti; Giorgio Mariuzzo
- Starring: Philippe Leroy; Leonora Fani
- Cinematography: Anton Giulio Borghesi
- Music by: Berto Pisano
- Distributed by: Variety Distribution
- Release date: 1974
- Country: Italy
- Language: Italian

La svergognata (The shameless woman), is a 1974 Italian erotic drama film directed by Giuliano Biagetti. It marked the film debut of Leonora Fani.

== Plot ==
Fabio is a writer in full creative crisis, married to Silvia, a beautiful actress for whom, however, he is no longer able to get excited. During a holiday with friends in Ischia, he meets the eighteen-year-old Ornella and a relationship slowly begins between the two.

== Cast ==
- Philippe Leroy: Fabio Lorenzi
- Leonora Fani: Ornella Bernardi
- Barbara Bouchet: Silvia Lorenzi
- Pupo De Luca: Nino Bernardi
- Maria Pia Conte: Giusy
- Stefano Amato: Andrea
- Dana Ghia: Clara

== See also ==
- List of Italian films of 1974
