= Bora Bora (1968 film) =

- Directed by: Ugo Liberatore
- Screenplay by: Ugo Liberatore
- Story by: Ugo Liberatore
- Produced by: Alfredo Bini; Eliseo Boschi
- Starring: Haydée Politoff; Corrado Pani; Doris Kunstmann; Rosine Copie
- Cinematography: Leonida Barboni
- Edited by: Giancarlo Cappelli
- Music by: Piero Piccioni (Italian version); Les Baxter (American version)
- Distributed by: American International Pictures
- Release date: 20 September 1968
- Running time: 97 minutes
- Country: Italy
- Language: Italian

Bora Bora is a 1968 Italian sexploitation film, directed and written by Ugo Liberatore starring Haydée Politoff, Corrado Pani, Doris Kunstmann, and Rosine Copie.

== Plot ==
An estranged married couple reconcile their differences in the sensual surroundings of a Tahitian island.

== Production ==
Bora Bora was picked up for American distribution by American International Pictures, who removed some scenes (cutting down the running length from 97 to 90 minutes) and replaced the original music of Italian composer Piero Piccioni with a new score by exotica legend Les Baxter, the studio's composer of choice.

== Cast ==
- Haydée Politoff as Marita Ferrio
- Corrado Pani as Roberto Ferrio
- Ivan Scratuglia as Man in the Ferry
- Doris Kunstmann as Susanne
- Rosine Copie as Tehina
- Antoine Coco Puputauki as Mani
