= Colpita da improvviso benessere =

- Directed by: Franco Giraldi
- Written by: Barbara Alberti; Amedeo Pagani; Ugo Pirro; Carlo Vanzina
- Produced by: Carlo Ponti
- Starring: Giovanna Ralli
- Cinematography: Alberto Spagnoli
- Edited by: Raimondo Crociani
- Music by: Luis Bacalov
- Release date: 1976
- Country: Italy
- Language: Italian

Colpita da improvviso benessere ("Struck by sudden wealth") is a 1976 Italian comedy film directed by Franco Giraldi.

== Plot ==
Elisabetta is a fishwife with petty-bourgeois aspirations who lives with Luiso Malerba, an anarchist on strike. One day, like all his colleagues in the General Markets, he has the misfortune of running into Gigino Mancuso, an upright health inspector. At the fish market Gigino denounces several irregularities regarding the origin and hygiene of fish products, and does not hesitate to have all the goods on sale immediately and repeatedly confiscated. Among other things, Gigino requires all retailers to use only bottled water for cleaning the premises and the fish, still alive on the counters and in the tanks.

Elisabetta, who is a handsome and unscrupulous woman, tries to seduce Gigino to obtain a special treatment, hoping that he will allow himself to be bribed. In fact, Gigino is sensitive to Elizabeth's provocations, hesitates and sometimes indulges in passion, without however affecting the correctness of his work as a public official. The fruitless relationship with Gigino places Elisabetta in a bad light in the eyes of her colleagues and competitors, in particular Fernando Proietti, who decides to also use unfair means in order to grab Elisabetta's clientele and get it closed. Business is falling apart and Elizabeth is forced to borrow money in order to afford to pay a bribe; first he asks his father, butcher, who denies them, then a loan shark.

== Cast ==
- Giovanna Ralli as Elisabetta Mancini
- Stefano Satta Flores as Gigino Mancuso
- Glauco Onorato as Fernando Proietti
- Franco Citti as Luiso Malerba
- Mario Carotenuto as Mr. Mancini, Elisabetta's father
- Renato Scarpa as Director
- Renzo Marignano as Fish vendor
- Enzo Liberti as Policeman

== See also ==
- List of Italian films of 1976
