= Down the Ancient Staircase =

1975 film

- Film poster
- Directed by: Mauro Bolognini
- Written by: Raffaele Andreassi; Mario Arosio; Sinko Solleville Marie; Tullio Pinelli; Mario Tobino; Bernardino Zapponi
- Produced by: Fulvio Lucisano
- Starring: Marcello Mastroianni
- Cinematography: Ennio Guarnieri
- Edited by: Nino Baragli
- Music by: Ennio Morricone
- Release dates: November 1975 (Paris Film Festival); November 1975 (Teheran International Film Festival); 6 November 1975 (Italy)
- Running time: 115 minutes
- Countries: Italy; France
- Language: Italian

Down the Ancient Staircase (Italian: Per le antiche scale) is a 1975 Italian-French drama film directed by Mauro Bolognini.

== Plot ==
In Italy, in 1930, Professor Bonaccorsi, renowned psychiatrist, conducts research on madness in the asylum where he works as a doctor in Tuscany. He has three mistresses: Bianca, his assistant; Carla, a colleague's wife; and Francesca, the wife of the asylum's director.

== Cast ==
- Marcello Mastroianni – Professor Bonaccorsi
- Françoise Fabian – Anna Bersani
- Marthe Keller – Bianca
- Barbara Bouchet – Carla
- Pierre Blaise – Tonio
- Maria Teresa Albani
- Maria Michi
- Paolo Pacino
- Silvano Tranquilli – Professor Rospigliosi
- Charles Fawcett – Doctor Sfameni
- Enzo Robutti
- Ferruccio De Ceresa – Fascist Official in train
- Lucia Bosé – Francesca
- Adriana Asti – Gianna
