= Leonora Fani =

Italian former film actress

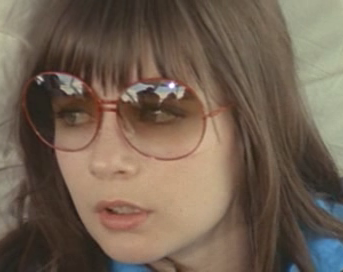
- Fani in the movie La svergognata (1974)
- Born: Eleonora Cristofani; 1954 (age 70–71); Crocetta del Montello, Treviso, Italy
- Occupation: Actress

Leonora Fani (born 1954) is an Italian former film actress.

== Career ==
Born in Crocetta del Montello, province of Treviso, as Eleonora Cristofani, Leonora Fani was launched in 1971 by winning the "Miss Teenager" pageant. Then she had a successful career in Italian B-movies, especially in the "violent-erotic" subgenre. She played, as typical roles, young girls with traumas or perversions of various kinds, or teenagers involved in stories mixing eroticism and violence.

== Filmography ==
- Metti... che ti rompo il muso (1973)
- La svergognata (1974)
- Don't Hurt Me, My Love (1974)
- Il domestico (1974)
- Act of Aggression (1975)
- Son tornate a fiorire le rose (1975)
- Private Lessons (1975)
- Born for Hell (1976)
- The Last Round (1976)
- Perché si uccidono (1976)
- Calde labbra (1976)
- Bestialità (1976)
- Nenè (1977)
- Hotel Fear (1977)
- Giallo a Venezia (1979)
- The House by the Edge of the Lake (1979)
- Peccati a Venezia (1980)
- Febbre a 40! (1980)
- Eden no sono (1980)
- Champagne... e fagioli (1980)
- Uomini di parola (1981)
- Habibi, amor mío (1981)
- Dei miei bollenti spiriti (1981) (TV)
- Difendimi dalla notte (1981)
