= L'appuntamento =

- Directed by: Giuliano Biagetti
- Written by: Giuliano Biagetti
- Starring: Renzo Montagnani; Barbara Bouchet
- Cinematography: Antonio Borghesi
- Music by: Berto Pisano
- Release date: 1977
- Country: Italy
- Language: Italian

L'appuntamento (The date), also known as L'appuntamento (...dove, come, quando?), is a 1977 Italian comedy film written and directed by Giuliano Biagetti.

== Plot ==
Adelmo is a Florentine employee who has an appointment with Adelaide, the most coveted of his colleagues. Thus began to move by car from the center of Florence to reach the woman. On the way, however, he encounters numerous obstacles: a policeman who gives him a fine, a rear-end collision between two cars, until he has an attack of colitis that forces him to look for a toilet in a hotel where he meets his boss in gallant company. When he leaves the hotel, he discovers that his car with the tow truck has been taken away; then he goes to a bar to call a taxi, but in the meantime he meets a colleague who takes him to his house to meet his family. Unexpectedly, the wife of the colleague begins to make advances to Adelmo. Finally in the taxi, Adelmo meets a young and beautiful foreign tourist, who is actually the wife of the Swedish consul who has run away from home and will put him further into trouble.

== Cast ==
- Renzo Montagnani: Adelmo Bartalesi
- Barbara Bouchet: Ingrid
- Mario Carotenuto: Commendatore
- Orchidea De Santis: wife of colleague
- Maria Pia Conte:Adelaide Picchioni
- Enzo Liberti: taxi driver
- Mario Pachi: Enrico Tonini, colleague of Adelmo
- Antonino Faà di Bruno: father of the colleague
- Sandro Bolchi: Amilcare Spaccesi
- Giuseppe Rovini: the grandmother of the recruit
- Mario Di Maio: the console
- Grazia Ignesti: the florist
- Emilio Pisani: the policeman
- Giuseppe Magdalone: the doorman
- Stefanina Pelati: the concierge
- Sergio Risso: the tripe
- Renato Moretti
- Giò Abrate
- Claudia Rericich

== See also ==
- List of Italian films of 1977
