= Questar Entertainment =

- Type: Private
- Industry: Entertainment
- Founded: 1980
- Founder: Albert Nader
- Headquarters: Chicago, Illinois, United States
- Area served: Worldwide
- Key people: Jonathan Plowman (CEO)
- Products: Documentary films; VHS (formerly); DVDs; Video on demand
- Website: https://www.questarentertainment.com/

Questar, Inc. (Questar Entertainment) is a Chicago-based digital, streaming OTT, production, acquisition and distribution company. Questar Entertainment launched two divisions: Cow Lamp Films in 2018, the company’s independent features division, and GoTraveler in 2019, a streaming channel and VOD app digital linear travel channel and free, advertiser- supported video on demand (AVOD) service.

== History ==
Albert Nader, a former Rand McNally employee, founded Questar in 1980 as The Travel Network; it took on the name Questar in 1985 after expanding beyond travel films. Under Nader, the company primarily released programs related to travel, history, and the Bible, some of which were broadcast on television channels such as PBS and Discovery. Nader died of a heart attack in December 2016 while on vacation in Palm Springs, California.

== Content ==
=== Content library ===
Questar Entertainment has produced approximately 100 original programs for Pureflix, PBS, the Discovery Channel, TLC, the Travel Channel, the History Channel, and PAX TV. Original titles include Touring Civil War Battlefields, The Dark, The Dream Motel, Real Pirates, and Where Jesus Walked.

Licensed titles distributed by Questar Entertainment include Rick Steves' Europe; Mexico: One Plate at a Time, with Rick Bayless; A Cook's Tour, with Anthony Bourdain; Women of the House, a spin-off of Designing Women; The Tribe; The New Adventures of Black Beauty; The Adventures of Swiss Family Robinson; My Classic Car; and It's a Miracle.

=== The Dream Motel ===
The Dream Motel is an original series produced by Questar Entertainment and Rossetti Productions. It was first released on Pureflix in October 2019. The series is about a motel where the guests have a chance to change their past, present, or their future. The show’s creator, Chip Rossetti, described the show as "a cross between Touched by an Angel, Quantum Leap and The Twilight Zone." The second season was released on October 1, 2021 on Pureflix.

== Divisions ==
=== Cow Lamp Films ===
Cow Lamp Films is the independent features division of Questar Entertainment. Cow Lamp Films focuses on diverse creative leaders in the midwest and beyond and also produces and distributes regional and international films and tv for an audience via major streaming platforms and cable television. The company is planning to release some of their films in theaters as well.

==== Films ====
- Olympia (2018), debuted at L.A. Film Festival
- Thieves Quartet (1993) written and directed by Joe Chappelle (The Wire, CSI: Miami)
- Rendezvous in Chicago (2018)
- The View From Tall (2016)
- Ginger (2018)
- Blacksmith (2019)
- A House is Not a Home: Wright or Wrong (2020)
- Driftless (2020)
- Community Theater Christmas (2020)
- Chicago Heights (2009)
- Banana Season (2020)
- Quarter Life Crisis (2017)
- Close Quarters (2012)
- Open Tables (2015)
- Animator (2018)
- Little Red (2012)
- Back at the Staircase (2018)
- The Law of Moises (2019)
- Skippers (2018)
- Empty Space (2016)
- Agents Unknown (2019)
- Something Out of Nothing (2019)
- Dear Coward on the Moon (2017)
- Skeletons in the Closet (2018)
- The Curators of Dixon School (2019)
- Welcome to Unity (2018)
- Hidden (2016)
- The Glass House (2014)
- Manlife (2017)
- Festival: A Documentary (2018)

=== GoTraveler ===
GoTraveler is a travel streaming channel and app digital linear travel channel and free, advertiser-supported video on demand (AVOD) service. GoTraveler content can be streamed through a number of desktop, mobile and internet-connected TV platforms including Android TV, Apple TV, Amazon Fire TV, Roku, Vizio SmartCast, and Plex (company). GoTraveler is currently producing a new original TV show called Curbside Eats which is centered around takeout and curbside cuisine.

==== Films ====
- Village of Swimming Cows (2018)
- Christmas in America's National Parks (2012)
- Wild National Parks (2012)
- Yosemite: America's Treasure (2008)
- Best of the National Parks (2004)
- Hidden (2016)
- Best of the Big Easy (2002)
- Running of the Bulls (2012)

==== Series ====
- Rick Steves' Europe, Seasons 7 & 8 (2012-2014)
- Porthole Cruise and Travel Show Hosted by Bill Panoff:, (2024)
- AmbienceTV (2020- )
- Savour Australia (2015)
- Mythical Roads (2010)
- Discovering the World (1996-2016)
- Laura McKenzie's Traveler (2012)
- Back Roads USA (2013)
- Under the Pole (2020)
- Cuba, Embracing its Future (2020)
- Grannies on Safari (2006- )
- Xtreme Tourist (2010)
- Smart Travels With Rudy Maxa (2002)
- Anthony Bourdain's A Cook's Tour (2002-2003)
- Around the World with Marlin Darrah (2020- )
- Canada's National Parks (2004)
- Secrets of the National Parks (2003)
- Best Parks Ever (2012)
- Inside America's National Parks (2006)
- America's National Parks (2015)
- Green Paradise (2011)
- Great Horses of the World (2015)
- Rituals of the World (2018)
- Wild Life (2013)
- Water Life (2009)
- Becoming a Man (2019)
- Family on the Road (2010)
- Backroads Europe (2015)
- The Silk Road (2019)
- In Search of Hidden Holy Sites (2016)
- Switzerland's Amazing Train Rides (2014)
- Disney Parks (2010)
- The New China (2015)
- Fantastic Festivals of the World (2004)
- Great Family Adventures (2011)
- Travel Thru History (2012)

GoTraveler was listed on Lifehacker’s "Top 10 YouTube Channels to Inspire You to Get Outside" and was spotlighted by Thrillist for its deep dive video into the Carlsbad Caverns.

AmbienceTV, a “Slow TV” production company and division of Questar Inc., was launched in 2019. It includes footage of The Shedd Aquarium, Ping Tom Park in Chicago, and Niagara Falls.

=== New Dimension Media ===
New Dimension Media (NDM) has produced and distributed original K-12 core curriculum video content to schools and public libraries for over 40 years. In the last 5 years, New Dimension Media produced 44 series and 417 programs. NDM titles are correlated to state, national, and Canadian provincial standards.
