= The Emperor of Paris =

2018 French historical drama film

- Theatrical release poster
- French: L'Empereur de Paris
- Directed by: Jean-François Richet
- Screenplay by: Éric Besnard; Jean-François Richet
- Produced by: Eric Altmayer; Nicolas Altmayer
- Starring: Vincent Cassel
- Cinematography: Manuel Dacosse
- Edited by: Hervé Schneid
- Music by: Marco Beltrami; Marcus Trumpp
- Distributed by: Gaumont
- Release date: 3 November 2018 (Arras Film Festival)
- Running time: 120 minutes
- Country: France
- Language: French
- Budget: $25.6 million
- Box office: $8.6 million

The Emperor of Paris is a 2018 French historical drama film directed by Jean-François Richet and written by Éric Besnard and Richet.

== Plot ==
The film is about an ex-con and master escape artist turned police officer. Under the reign of Napoleon, Francois Vidocq cuts a notorious figure in the Parisian underworld - he is the only man to have escaped the country's most terrifying penal colonies. However, some years later, he switched sides and gets hired as a detective in the French police. He founded his own private detective agency and became one of the greatest detectives of all times. However, his dark past still follows him...

== Cast ==
- Vincent Cassel as Eugène-François Vidocq
- Freya Mavor as Annette
- Denis Ménochet as Dubillard
- August Diehl as Nathanael de Wenger
- James Thierrée as Duke of Neufchâteau
- Patrick Chesnais as M. Henry
- Olga Kurylenko as Baroness Roxane of Giverny
- Fabrice Luchini as Joseph Fouché
- Denis Lavant as Maillard
- Jérôme Pouly as Courtaux
- Antoine Basler as Perrin

== Production ==
=== Filming ===
Shooting began on 25 September 2017. Between 19 October and 10 November 2017, scenes were shot on "La Base", the former Air Base 217 located near Brétigny-sur-Orge and Le Plessis-Pâté in the Essonne department.

Production also took place in the castles of Vaux-le-Vicomte and Fontainebleau in Seine-et-Marne, as well as in Pontoise Cathedral in Val-d'Oise.

== Release ==
The film premiered at the Arras Film Festival on 3 November 2018. It was later released in France and Belgium on 19 December 2018, followed by other countries on later dates.
