= La novizia =

1975 film by Giuliano Biagetti

- Directed by: Pier Giorgio Ferretti
- Written by: Giuliano Biagetti; Giorgio Mariuzzo
- Cinematography: Franco Villa
- Music by: Berto Pisano
- Release date: 1975
- Running time: 95 minute
- Language: Italian

La novizia (The novice), is a 1975 Italian erotic comedy-drama film directed by Giuliano Biagetti (here credited as Pier Giorgio Ferretti).

== Cast ==
- Gloria Guida: Maria aka Sister Immacolata
- Gino Milli: Vittorio
- Lionel Stander: Don Ninì
- Femi Benussi: Nuziatina
- Maria Pia Conte: Franca
