= Queens of Evil =

- Theatrical release poster
- Directed by: Tonino Cervi
- Screenplay by: Antonio Triose; Raoul Katz; Tonino Cervi
- Story by: Tonino Cervi; Benedetto Benedetti
- Produced by: Alessandro Jacovoni
- Starring: Haydée Politoff; Silvia Monti; Ewelyn Stewart; Raymond Lovelock; Guido Alberti; Gianni Santuccio
- Cinematography: Sergio D'Offizi
- Edited by: Mario Morra
- Music by: Angelo Francesco Lavagnino
- Production companies: Flavia Cinematografica; Labrador Films; Carlton Film Export
- Distributed by: Regionale (Italy); Planfilm (France)
- Release date: December 1970 (Italy)
- Running time: 90 minutes
- Countries: Italy; France
- Language: Italian

Queens of Evil (Italian: Le regine) is a 1970 fantasy horror film directed by Tonino Cervi and starring Haydée Politoff, Silvia Monti, Ida Galli and Ray Lovelock.

== Plot ==
A young carefree hippie named David is involved in an altercation with a motorist after stopping to fix his flat tire, which results in the motorist's death. David avoids the police and rides deep into the forest, spending the night in a woodshed. The next morning, he encounters three mysterious sisters who entice and draw him into their world.

== Cast ==
- Haydée Politoff as Liv
- Silvia Monti as Samantha
- Ida Galli as Bibiana
- Ray Lovelock as David
- Gianni Santuccio as the Devil
- Guido Alberti as the Priest

== Release ==
Mondo Macabro released Queens of Evil on Blu-ray on March 9, 2021.

== Reception ==
Rue Morgue magazine spoke positively of the film, praising its "hazy dreamlike quality" and noting it possesses "an obvious giallo flavor," while drawing comparisons to Lucio Fulci's A Lizard in a Woman's Skin (1971) as "a film similarly entranced/repulsed by hippie culture and sexual transgression."
