= Love Problems =

- Directed by: Giuliano Biagetti
- Written by: Giuliano Biagetti; Luciano Lucignani; Dacia Maraini
- Produced by: Giancarlo Segarelli
- Starring: Haydée Politoff
- Cinematography: Antonio Borghesi
- Music by: Stefano Torossi
- Release date: 1968
- Country: Italy
- Language: Italian

Love Problems (Italian: L'età del malessere, literally "The Age of Uneasiness") is a 1968 Italian drama film directed by Giuliano Biagetti. It stars actor Gabriele Ferzetti. The film is based on a novel by Dacia Maraini.

== Cast ==
- Haydée Politoff as Enrica
- Jean Sorel as Giorgio
- Eleonora Rossi Drago as Countess
- Gabriele Ferzetti as Guido
- Salvo Randone
- Yorgo Voyagis
- Claudio Gora
