= The Big Delirium =

1975 film

- Directed by: Dennis Berry
- Written by: Dennis Berry
- Starring: Jean Seberg
- Cinematography: Pierre Lhomme
- Edited by: Renée Lichtig
- Music by: Patrick Lanjean
- Release date: 30 April 1975
- Running time: 90 minutes
- Country: France
- Language: French

The Big Delirium (French: Le Grand Délire) is a 1975 French drama film directed by Dennis Berry.

== Cast ==
- Jean Seberg - Emily
- Pierre Blaise - Pierre
- Wolfgang Preiss - Artmann
- Isabelle Huppert - Marie
- Yves Beneyton - John
- Georges Adet
- Gladys Berry
- Stefania Casini
- Jacques Debary
- Antonia Lotito
- Danièle Nègre

== See also ==
- Isabelle Huppert on screen and stage
