= Olga Bisera =

Yugoslav-born Italian film actress and producer

- Born: Bisera Vukotić; 26 May 1944 (age 81); Mostar, Bosna i Hercegovina
- Occupation: Actress
- Years active: 1967–1981
- Partner: Luciano Martino

Bisera Vukotić (Serbian Cyrillic: Бисера Вукотић; born 26 May 1944), known professionally as Olga Bisera, is a Yugoslav-born Italian film actress and producer.

She was born in Mostar, Bosnia and Herzegovina. She entered the Drama Arts Academy in Belgrade.

At 25 she made her film debut in Hollywood in Sidney Pollack's Castle Keep, and was put under contract by Columbia Pictures, moving to New York and attending the Lee Strasberg Theatre and Film Institute.

In the early 1970s Bisera moved to Italy, where she founded a production company, Cinemondial, and became a starlet of Italian genre cinema. She also appeared in The Spy Who Loved Me.

She retired in the early 1980s.

== Partial filmography ==
- Castle Keep (1969) – Baker's Wife
- Ancora una volta prima di lasciarci (1973) – Marta
- Super Fly T.N.T. (1973) – Lisa
- Women in Cell Block 7 (1973) – Gerda
- Amore libero - Free Love (1974) – Katia
- Lunatics and Lovers (1976) – Ivana
- The Virgo, the Taurus and the Capricorn (1977) – Enrica
- The Spy Who Loved Me (1977) – Felicca
- Safari Rally (1978) – Sandra Stark
