= Mirta Miller =

Argentine actress

- Born: Mirta Jovita Bugni Chatard; 16 August 1948 (age 77); Buenos Aires, Argentina
- Occupation: Actress
- Years active: 1961-present

Mirta Miller (born 16 August 1948) is an Argentine film actress. She has appeared in more than 65 films since 1961. She was born in Buenos Aires, Argentina.

== Selected filmography ==
- No Exit (1962)
- Una chica casi decente (1971)
- Dr. Jekyll y el Hombre Lobo (1972)
- The Girl from the Red Cabaret (1973)
- El gran amor del conde Drácula (Count Dracula's Great Loves) (1974)
- Cría cuervos (1976)
- The Legion Like Women (1976)
- Doña Perfecta (1977)
- Bolero (1984)
