= Aenigma (film) =

1987 Italian horror film by Lucio Fulci

Ænigma
- Directed by: Lucio Fulci
- Screenplay by: Lucio Fulci; Giorgio Mariuzzo
- Story by: Lucio Fulci; Giorgio Mariuzzo
- Produced by: Boro Banjac; Ettore Spanuolo
- Starring: Jared Martin; Lara Naszinsky; Ulli Reinthaler
- Cinematography: Luigi Ciccarese
- Edited by: Vanio Amici
- Music by: Carlo Maria Cordio
- Production companies: A.M. Trading International S.r.l; Sutjeska Film
- Release dates: 30 December 1987 (France); 1 September 1988 (Rome)
- Running time: 90 minutes
- Countries: Italy; Yugoslavia

Ænigma is a 1987 horror film directed by Lucio Fulci and was produced by Boro Banjac, Walter Brandi and Ettore Spanuolo. The plot evolves around supernatural and paranormal phenomena in relation to violent deaths occurring in an American college perpetrated by a newcomer who is possessed by a serial killer's ghost.

== Plot ==
At St. Mary's College, a boarding school for girls located just outside Boston, Massachusetts, a lonely, gaunt, unattractive student named Kathy becomes the center of a cruel practical joke perpetrated by a gang of students and the hunky but sadistic gym teacher, Fred Vernon. Kathy is tricked into going on a date with Mr. Vernon. When she over eagerly makes her move onto him in his parked car in the woods, the students appear in their cars to taunt her. Running away from several carloads of her tormentors, Kathy runs onto a busy street where she immediately gets hit by an oncoming car and is admitted to the local hospital in a coma. Kathy's strange mother, Mary, continues to gloom around the school in her capacity as a cleaner.

Sometime later, a new girl named Eva Gordon arrives at the school, where she is shown around by the stern headmistress Miss Jones and given Kathy's old room. Eva becomes acquainted with several of the perpetrators of the stunt. Eva turns out to be Kathy. Eva has somehow been possessed by the spirit of the comatose Kathy who begins using supernatural powers of telekinesis and magic to exact revenge against all those involved in the prank that put her in a coma. The first victim is Mr. Vernon, who asks Eva on a date. That night while waiting for Eva to show up at the gym for their secret rendezvous, the narcissist Mr. Vernon is attacked and strangled by his reflection when it jumps out of a mirror. The following morning, the police detective on the scene concludes that Mr. Vernon died of a heart attack.

The following night, Virginia Williams, one of the students involved in the prank against Kathy, is attacked in her bed and suffocated to death by an onslaught of snails that appear and then disappear. Again the police do not have any explanation for the mysterious death, except that she was probably suffocated using a pillow.

Meanwhile, the neurologist in charge of Kathy's case, Dr. Robert Anderson, notices that Kathy's vital signs increase in step with each of the mysterious deaths at the school. But he cannot make a connection to it. The next morning, Dr. Anderson is called to the school to examine Eva when she has a violent breathing fit during a class. During that same time, Kathy's respirator temporally breaks down, which leads to Eva's respiratory attack, but nobody makes any connection to it. Afterward, the strange Eva comes on strong to Dr. Anderson, leading him to ask her on a date where afterward she seduces him.

During a field trip to a local art gallery, Grace, another one of Kathy's tormentors, returns to the gallery when it closes to search for a valuable piece of jewelry that she left behind on the day visit. A marble statue comes to life and falls on her, crushing her to death.

Dr. Anderson starts to become more apprehensive about the intense Eva. One evening, he suffers a horrible nightmare where she kills him after sex. He's relieved when Eva's mother arrives at the school to take her home for some rest. Eva begins to write obsessive love notes to him, but he brushes them off. Soon, Anderson becomes involved with another girl named Jenny Clark, the only student who shows remorse for the prank gone wrong against Kathy.

Eva runs away from home and returns to the school after dark. Eva sets her eyes on Kim, one of Kathy's cruelest tormentors. As Kim is preparing to meet her boyfriend, Tom, for a date, Eva makes Kim see horrific visions of Tom being decapitated at every turn. Kim suffers an anxiety attack and in attempting to flee from the gory visions, plummets out of a third-floor window to her death. Tom arrives seconds later, looks out an open window, and sees Kim lying dead on the pavement below. Tom is decapitated when Eva commands the window blind to fall on his neck. Eva quietly leaves the building while Kathy's mother, Mary, watches.

At the hospital, Jenny arrives for a late-night date with Dr. Anderson, when she gets lost in the gloomily lit building, thanks to Eva using Kathy's magic skills of mind-bending. Jenny ends up in the morgue where she encounters Eva. The possessed girl grabs a scalpel and threatens to kill Jenny for taking away her man, but Anderson arrives to intercept the scalpel's slash but gets badly slashed on his forearm. As Eva raises the scalpel to stab them both, she suddenly freezes, gasps for a few seconds, and falls to the floor dead.

Upstairs in Kathy's hospital room, her mother has pulled out all her intravenous drips, removed the respirator, and turned off the life support systems. Appalled at the supernatural evil of her comatose daughter, Mary has somehow figured out Kathy's connection to Eva and has decided to put her daughter to rest and put an end to the bloody killings she committed. Kathy's spirit rises out of her body, floats out a nearby window, and disappears into the night sky.

== Cast ==
- Jared Martin as Dr. Robert Anderson
- Lara Lamberti as Eva Gordon (as Lara Naszinski)
- Ulli Reinthaler as Jenny Clark
- Sophie d'Aulan as Kim
- Jennifer Naud as Grace O'Neil
- Riccardo Acerbi as Fred Vernon
- Kathi Wise as Virginia Williams
- Milijana Zirojevic as Kathy (as Mijlijana Zirojevic)
- Dragan Bjelogrlić as Tom (as Dragan Ejelogrlic)
- Ljiljana Blagojević as Ms. Jones (as Lijlijana Blagojevic)
- Franciska Spahic as Joanne
- Dusica Zegarac as Mary
- Zorica Lesic as Miss James
- Rade Colovic as Tom
- Sabrina Siani as Student (uncredited)
- Lucio Fulci as Inspector (uncredited)

== Production ==
The story and screenplay of the film were written by Giorgio Mariuzzo and director Lucio Fulci. Fulci acknowledged the influence of Carrie when making the film, declaring it "one of my best films of recent years" and that it was "a sort of Carrie in which there are two characters".

Lara Naszinski was cast as Eva in the film after Ettore Spanuolo's production company contacted her.

Aenigma was shot on location in Sarajevo. Some sources state that the film had location work done in Massachusetts, but the lead actors insisted that everything was shot in Sarajevo.

For the Italian film journal "Nocturno", cinematographer Luigi Ciccarese stated that Fulci was a maestro, who sometimes did things that at first did not seem to make sense - until one saw the results. Ciccarese further remembered that it was Fulci who came up with all the gimmicks and effects, and that he himself would have never thought of shooting a scene with the snails.

== Release ==
Ænigma was first released in France on December 30, 1987. It was then released the next year in Italy in Rome on September 1, 1988 then in Milan on October 7. It was distributed independently in Italy and had a 90 minute running time.

== Reception ==
From contemporary reviews, Philip Nutman and Mario Cortini wrote in Gorezone that Ænigma lacked an original premise while "Fulci enlivens the mundane proceedings with a handful of ultragory scenes, include a naked girl violated by an army of slugs and snails".

From retrospective reviews, Donald C Willis wrote in his book Horror and Science Fiction Film IV, that the film as an "episodic horror-fantasy variation on Carrie by way of Patrick and The Medusa Touch" and that the "heavy-handed intro" makes the film get "off to a bad start". In his biography on Fulci, Troy Howarth noted that Ænigma was an uneven film specifically noting poor cinematography by Luigi Ciccarese, which he felt was derivative of Argento's Phenomena.

In 1999, Italian film critic Marco Giusti wrote that Fulci himself saw Ænigma as a transitional film. Giusti remembers that the fans expected Fulci's return to the gore of the early 1980s, but that the film was not wholly successful since it was too similar to many others with its frightened girls and college slashings.
