= Donna... cosa si fa per te =

- Directed by: Giuliano Biagetti
- Written by: Marino Onorati; Michele Massimo Tarantini
- Starring: Renzo Montagnani; Jenny Tamburi
- Cinematography: Franco Villa
- Music by: Berto Pisano
- Release date: 1976
- Country: Italy
- Language: Italian

Donna... cosa si fa per te (Woman... The Things We Do for You), is a 1976 Italian comedy film directed by Giuliano Biagetti.

== Plot ==
A rich Tuscan aristocrat allows himself to be seduced by a beautiful woman to whom he gives a ride. The girl tries to move him with phoney and pathetic family stories, hiding she is actually a prostitute.

== Cast ==
- Renzo Montagnani: Count Cecco Balducci
- Jenny Tamburi: Sole
- Enzo Liberti: Man from Rome
- Filippo De Gara: Count Mondino Altoviti
- Maria Pia Conte: Countess Altoviti
- Raf Luca: Gargiulo
- Franca Scagnetti

== See also ==
- List of Italian films of 1976
