= Maria Pia Conte =

Italian former actress

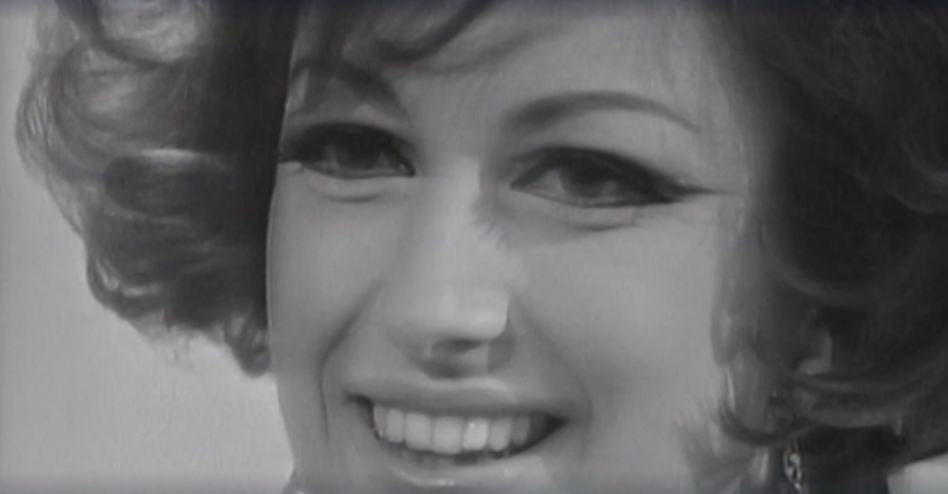
- Born: Maria Pia Vaccarezza; 10 March 1944 (age 82); Genoa, Kingdom of Italy
- Other name: Mary P. Count
- Occupation: Actress

Maria Pia Conte (born 10 March 1944) is an Italian former actress.

== Life and career ==
Born Maria Pia Vaccarezza in Genoa, Italy, the daughter of a carpenter, Conte spent her youth in Sestri Levante before moving to Genoa to study classical ballet. After a few experiences as a child actress, she was first noted as a fotoromanzi model, then she decided to pursue an acting career and enrolled the Centro Sperimentale di Cinematografia, graduating in 1962. Conte made her acting debut in 1961, in the Marco Bellocchio's short film La colpa e la pena, then she appeared in a number of films and TV series, often in secondary roles, being sometimes credited as Mary P. Count. She was also occasionally active as a voice actress and a dubber. She retired in the late 1970s.

== Filmography ==
| Year | Title | Role | Notes |
|---|---|---|---|
| 1954 | Tripoli, Beautiful Land of Love | | |
| 1964 | Death on the Fourposter | Nikki | |
| 1964 | Hero of Rome | Valeria | |
| 1964 | Ali Baba and the Seven Saracens | Fatima's Friend | |
| 1965 | Le notti della violenza | | |
| 1966 | Vacanze sulla neve | | |
| 1966 | Five Dollars for Ringo | Miriam Grady | |
| 1966 | Il pianeta errante | | |
| 1966 | Dinamite Jim | Lupita | |
| 1967 | Blueprint for a Massacre | | |
| 1967 | La morte viene dal pianeta Aytin | Countess | Uncredited |
| 1967 | Ballata da un miliardo | | |
| 1967 | Peggio per me... meglio per te | Gabriella | |
| 1968 | If You Meet Sartana Pray for Your Death | Jane | |
| 1969 | Nel labirinto del sesso (Psichidion) | | |
| 1969 | Madame Bovary | Felicitas | |
| 1969 | Love Is a Funny Thing | La femme d'Henri | |
| 1969 | Juliette de Sade | Juliette | |
| 1969 | La última aventura del Zorro | Isabel | |
| 1970 | Veinte pasos para la muerte | Hazel | |
| 1970 | Hell in the Aegean aka The Battle of Crete | Ann Gordon | |
| 1970 | Defeat of the Mafia | Jenny Ryan | |
| 1970 | The Underground | | |
| 1971 | Mazzabubù... Quante corna stanno quaggiù? | Moglie del pizzicagnolo | |
| 1971 | And the Crows Will Dig Your Grave | Susan | |
| 1971 | Il ritorno del gladiatore più forte del mondo | Licia | |
| 1972 | La rebelión de los bucaneros | | |
| 1972 | God in Heaven... Arizona on Earth | Catherine | |
| 1972 | Testa in giù, gambe in aria | | |
| 1973 | Tony Arzenta | Carré's Secretary in the Nightclub | Uncredited |
| 1973 | The Hanging Woman | Nadia Mihaly | |
| 1974 | The Arena | Lucinia | |
| 1974 | Spasmo | Xenia | |
| 1974 | And Now My Love | | |
| 1974 | Prigione di donne | Martine's Friend | |
| 1974 | La svergognata | Giusy | |
| 1975 | Il sergente Rompiglioni diventa... caporale | Gisella | |
| 1975 | La novizia | Franca | |
| 1976 | L'infermiera... di mio padre | | |
| 1976 | Che dottoressa ragazzi! | Sigrun | |
| 1976 | Vento, vento, portali via con te | | |
| 1976 | Donna... cosa si fa per te | Countess Altoviti | |
| 1977 | Operazione Kappa: sparate a vista | Ostaggia | |
| 1977 | L'appuntamento | Adelaide Picchioni | |
| 1978 | Moglie nuda e siciliana | Sandra - friend of Rosalia | |
| 1978 | Gegè Bellavita | Mercedes | (final film role) |
