= Interrabang (film) =

- Theatrical release poster
- Directed by: Giuliano Biagetti
- Screenplay by: Luciano Lucignani; Giorgio Mariuzzo; Edgar Mills
- Story by: Edgar Mills
- Produced by: Giancarlo Segarelli
- Starring: Haydee Politoff; Corrado Pani; Beba Lončar; Umberto Orsini; Shoshana Cohen
- Cinematography: Antonio Borghesi
- Edited by: Marcella Bevilacqua
- Music by: Berto Pisano
- Production company: Salaria Film
- Distributed by: Variety Distribution
- Release date: 31 December 1969
- Running time: 93 minutes
- Country: Italy
- Language: Italian

Interrabang is a 1969 Italian giallo film directed by Giuliano Biagetti, starring Haydee Politoff and Beba Lončar. The title refers to the "Interrobang" (‽), a punctuation mark that combines a question mark and an exclamation mark, which appears on a necklace worn by Politoff's character Valeria throughout the film.

== Plot ==
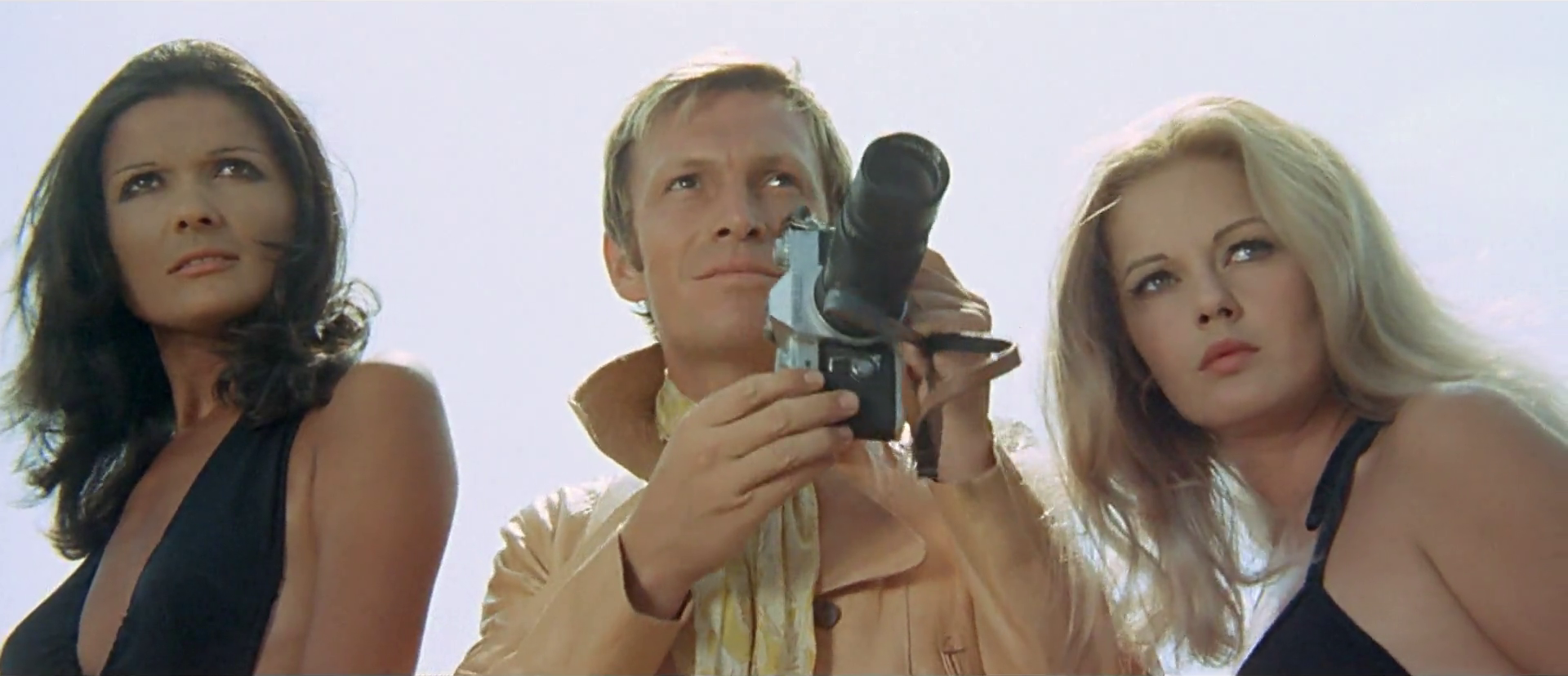
Shoshana Cohen, Umberto Orsini and Beba Lončar in a scene from the film.

One summer day, famous fashion photographer Fabrizio sails to a small Mediterranean island for a photoshoot, accompanied by his business partner wife Anna, Israeli model Maregalit, and Anna's sister Valeria. A radio news bulletin reports that an escaped convict has murdered a policeman and is still on the run. The group discover that their boat has run out of fuel, and Fabrizio hitches a ride on a passing speedboat to return to the mainland in order to get a petrol can. So, the three women are left to explore the island, where they meet a mysterious man, Marco, who claims to be a writer. They also discover the corpse of a policeman, which then disappears.

== Cast ==
- Haydee Politoff as Valeria
- Corrado Pani as Marco
- Beba Lončar as Anna
- Umberto Orsini as Fabrizio
- Shoshana Cohen as Maregalit
- Edmondo Saglio as Policeman On Boat
- Tellino Tellini as Policeman On Boat
- Antonietta Fiorito as Girl On Speedboat

== Home media ==
Interrabang was released on Region 2 DVD in Italy in 2012, though the release does not include English subtitles.

== Soundtrack ==
The soundtrack to Interrabang, composed by Berto Pisano, was released on CD in Italy in 2005.
