= Rendezvous in Paris (1995 film) =

1995 film by Éric Rohmer

- Theatrical release poster
- French: Les Rendez-vous de Paris
- Directed by: Éric Rohmer
- Written by: Éric Rohmer
- Produced by: Françoise Etchegaray
- Starring: Mathias Mégard; Clara Bellar; Judith Chancel; Antoine Basler; Aurore Rauscher; Serge Renko; Bénédicte Loyen; Michael Kraft; Veronika Johansson; Malcolm Conrath; Cécile Parès; Olivier Poujol
- Cinematography: Diane Baratier
- Edited by: Mary Stephen
- Music by: Sébastien Erms
- Production company: Compagnie Éric Rohmer
- Distributed by: Les Films du Losange
- Release date: 22 March 1995 (France)
- Running time: 94 minutes
- Country: France
- Language: French

Rendezvous in Paris (French: Les Rendez-vous de Paris) is a 1995 French romantic comedy anthology film written and directed by Éric Rohmer.

The film consists of three loosely connected episodes revolving around chance meetings in Paris: "Le Rendez-vous de 7 heures" ("The Rendezvous at 7 P.M."), in which a student discovers her boyfriend is two-timing her; "Les Bancs de Paris" ("The Benches of Paris"), in which an unnamed woman has a series of meetings in parks with a handsome literature teacher from the suburbs; and "Mère et enfant 1907" ("Mother and Child 1907"), which takes its title from a Picasso painting, and centres on an artist who is attracted by a stranger. The three stories of the film are linked by a girl singing in the streets to an accordion accompaniment—a homage to René Clair's Under the Roofs of Paris (1930).

== Cast ==
=== "Le Rendez-vous de 7 heures" ===
- Clara Bellar as Esther
- Antoine Basler as Horace
- Mathias Mégard as flirt
- Judith Chancel as Aricie
- Malcolm Conrath as Félix
- Cécile Parès as Hermione
- Olivier Poujol as coffee-shop waiter

=== "Les Bancs de Paris" ===
- Aurore Rauscher as Elle
- Serge Renko as Lui

=== "Mère et enfant, 1907" ===
- Michael Kraft as painter
- Bénédicte Loyen as young woman
- Veronika Johansson as Swedish woman

=== Musette à Mouffetard ===
- Florence Levu as street singer
- Christian Bassoul as accordion player

== See also ==
- Rendezvous in Chicago (2018)
