= Cesare Lanza =

Italian journalist and author (born 1942)

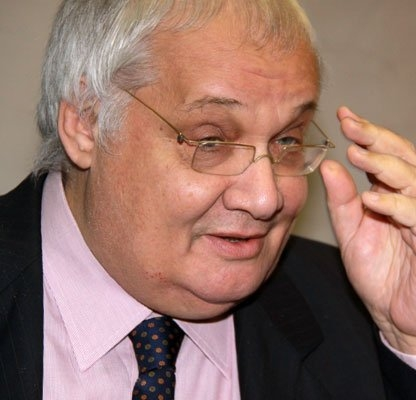
- Cesare Lanza in 2008
- Born: July 8, 1942 (age 82); Cosenza, Italy
- Occupation(s): journalist, author

Cesare Lanza (born 8 July 1942) is an Italian journalist and author.

Born in Cosenza, Lanza started working as a journalist at fourteen years old. In 1976 he became the director of Il Secolo XIX and later he directed several other newspapers and magazines. In 1976 he debuted as an author with the novel Nenè, which one year later was adapted by Salvatore Samperi into a film with the same name. In 2008 he made his directorial debut with the drama film La Perfezionista. He is also a television author.
