= Giorgio Mariuzzo =

Italian screenwriter and director (1939–2023)

- Born: 7 July 1939; Venice, Kingdom of Italy
- Died: 16 January 2023 (aged 83); San Colombano al Lambro, Italy
- Occupations: Screenwriter, director

Giorgio Mariuzzo (7 July 1939 – 16 January 2023) was an Italian screenwriter and director.

== Life and career ==
Born in Venice, Mariuzzo entered the cinema industry in 1968 as an assistant director, then since the mid-1970s he started writing screenplays and also directed a number of films. Best known for his collaboration with Lucio Fulci in the early 1980s, from 1985 he was mainly active on television.

== Selected filmography ==
- Interrabang (1969)
- La svergognata (1974)
- La novizia (1975)
- La dottoressa sotto il lenzuolo (1976)
- Apache Woman (1976, also director)
- L'insegnante al mare con tutta la classe (1980)
- La moglie in vacanza... l'amante in città (1980)
- La moglie in bianco... l'amante al pepe (1980)
- Contraband (1980)
- Mia moglie torna a scuola (1981)
- I carabbimatti (1981)
- Pierino medico della Saub (1981)
- The House by the Cemetery (1981)
- The Beyond (1981)
- Zero in condotta (1983)
- Aenigma (1987)
