= The Young Wolves =

- Directed by: Marcel Carné
- Written by: Claude Accursi; Marcel Carné
- Produced by: Véra Belmont; René Pignières; Italo Zingarelli
- Starring: Christian Hay; Haydée Politoff; Yves Beneyton
- Cinematography: Jacques Robin
- Edited by: Renée Lichtig
- Music by: Jack Arel; Cyril Azzam; Guy Magenta
- Production companies: Société Nouvelle de Cinématographie; West Film
- Distributed by: Société Nouvelle de Cinématographie
- Release date: 2 April 1968
- Running time: 107 minutes
- Countries: France; Italy
- Language: French

The Young Wolves (French: Les jeunes loups) is a 1968 French-Italian drama film directed by Marcel Carné and starring Christian Hay, Haydée Politoff and Yves Beneyton.

== Cast ==
- Christian Hay as Alain Langlois
- Haydée Politoff as Sylvie
- Yves Beneyton as Jean-Emmanuel de Saint-Sever, dit Chris
- Maurice Garrel as Ugo Castellini
- Gamil Ratib as Prince Linzani
- Stéphane Bouy as Riccione, le photographe
- Rolande Kalis as Evelyne
- Bernard Dhéran as Jean-Noël
- Elizabeth Teissier as Princesse Linzani
- Serge Leeman as Jojo
- René Lefevre-Bel as Gaston, le majordome
- Luc Bongrand as Eddie
- Elina Labourdette as Madame Sinclair
- Roland Lesaffre as Albert
- Robert De Niro as Un hippie chez Popov
- Jean Panisse as Le garagiste
- Marguerite Muni as Irma, la femme de chambre
- Anny Nelsen as Kim, le modèle
- Gilbert Servien as Inspecteur commissariat

== Production ==
The film's sets were designed by the art director Rino Mondellini.

== Bibliography ==
- Edward Baron Turk. Child of Paradise: Marcel Carné and the Golden Age of French Cinema. Harvard University Press, 1989.
