= Antoine Basler =

Swiss actor

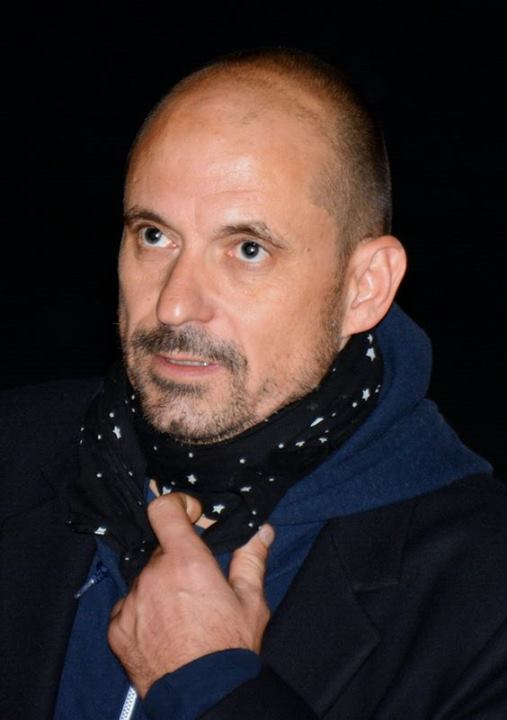
- Antoine Basler in 2013
- Born: Lausanne, Switzerland
- Occupation: Actor
- Years active: 1983–present

Antoine Basler is a Swiss actor. He has appeared in more than sixty films since 1983.

== Selected filmography ==
Film
Year	Title	Role	Notes
1995	Les Rendez-vous de Paris	Horace	
1996	Fourbi	Pierrot	
1996	Irma Vep		
1997	Dobermann	Jean-Claude Ayache dit Moustique	
2007	99 Francs	Marc Maronnier	
2009	A Prophet	Pilicci	
2010	The Assault	Solignac	
2012	Flight of the Storks	Marcel Minaus	
2014	Le Dernier Diamant	Scylla	
2014	Colt 45	Lieutenant Joseph Fleischmann	
2018	L'empereur de Paris	Perrin	
2022	Pierrot le Fou	Courtois	
2022	The Sitting Duck	Un gendarme	

TV
Year	Title	Role	Notes
2008	Mafiosa	Commissaire Rocca	
2015	The law of Alexandre	Franck Mangin	
2020	Bulle	Louis	
