= Safari Rally (film) =

1978 Italian action film

- Directed by: Bitto Albertini
- Cinematography: Sandro Mancori
- Music by: Carlo Rustichelli
- Distributed by: Variety Distribution
- Release date: 1978
- Language: Italian

6000 km di paura, internationally released as Safari Rally, is a 1978 action film directed by Bitto Albertini.

== Cast ==
- Marcel Bozzuffi: Paul Stark
- Olga Bisera: Sandra Stark
- Joe Dallesandro: Joe Massi
- Eleonora Giorgi: Lucile Davis
- Enzo Fiermonte
