= Yves Beneyton =

French actor

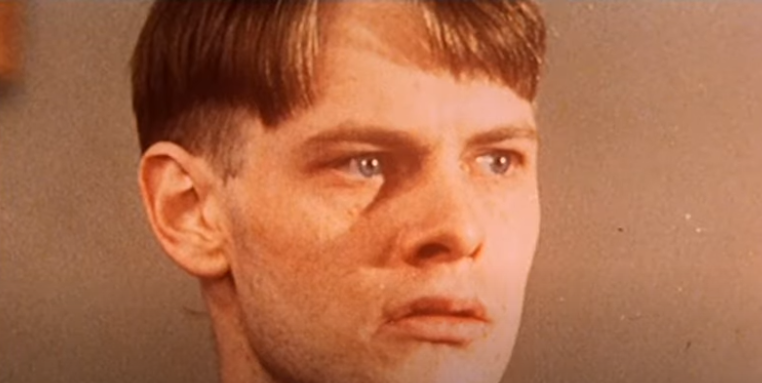
- Yves Beneyton
- Born: August 3, 1946 (age 79)
- Occupation: Actor
- Years active: 1967–2020

Yves Beneyton (born 3 August 1946) is a French actor.

== Filmography ==
=== Film ===
Yves Beneyton film credits
Year	Title	Role	Notes	Ref.
1967	Two or Three Things I Know About Her	Young man		
1967	Weekend	Un membre du FLSO	Uncredited	
1968	The Young Wolves	Jean-Emmanuel de Saint-Sever, dit Chris		
1968	À tout casser	Toto		
1969	L'Amour fou	Yves / Oreste		
1969	Paulina Is Leaving	Nicolas		
1970	Mio Mao: Fatiche ed avventure di alcuni giovani occidentali per introdurre il vizio in Cina	Giuda		
1971	Nel nome del padre	Angelo Transeunti		
1972	Guardami nuda	Unknown		
1972	D'amore si muore			
1973	Io e lui	Maurizio		
1973	Le mariage à la mode	Jean-Michel		
1974	By the Blood of Others	Le psychopathe		
1974	Verginità			
1975	The Big Delirium	John		
1975	Verbrande brug	Louis		
1976	Bait	Ken		
1976	L'ombre des châteaux	Le chef motard		
1977	The Lacemaker	François Beligne		
1977	Il mostro	Giorgio Mesca		
1979	On efface tout	Jacques Fouchet		
1980	La fuite en avant	Michel		
1981	Chariots of Fire	George Andre		
1981	The Fall of the Rebel Angels	Giovanni		
1982	Enigma	Unknown		
1983	Amok			
1983	La crime	Millard, le directeur du ministre de l'Intérieur		
1985	L'amour propre ne le reste jamais très longtemps	Olivier		
1987	François Villon - Poetul vagabond	Charruau		
1988	Sanguines	Pierre Salieri		
1988	The Kiss of the Tiger	Jacques		
1989	La Révolution française	Fouquier-Tinville	Segment: "Années terribles, Les"	
1990	Eminent Domain	Roger		
1994	Oh God, Women Are So Loving	Jacques		
1998	Déjà mort	David's father		
1999	Rogue Trader	Pierre Beaumarchais		
2003	Une affaire qui roule	Le père de Noisette		
2012	Ici-bas	Père Simon		

=== Television ===
Yves Beneyton television credits
Year	Title	Role	Notes	Ref.
1981	Three Paths to the Lake	Phillipe	TV movie	
1979	The Island of Thirty Coffins	Philippe Maroux	6 episodes	
1980	The Professionals	Rene Lacoste	Episode: "Blood Sports"	
1984	Robin of Sherwood	Reynald de Villaret	Episode: "Seven Poor Knights from Acre"	
1985	Letters to an Unknown Lover	Gervais	TV movie	
1986	The Return of Sherlock Holmes	Eduardo Lucas	Episode: "The Second Stain"	
1992	Counterstrike	the Thin Man / the Grey Wolf / Derek Wolf	Episode: "La Belle Dame Monique"	
