= Rivalry (film) =

1953 film

- Directed by: Giuliano Biagetti
- Written by: Roberto Rossellini; Antonio Pietrangeli
- Cinematography: Augusto Tiezzi
- Music by: Roman Vlad
- Release date: 1953
- Country: Italy
- Language: Italian

Rivalry (Italian: Rivalità, also known as Medico condotto) is a 1953 Italian melodrama film. Written, produced and overseen by Roberto Rossellini, it marked the directorial debut of Giuliano Biagetti. The film was shot and set in Castiglione della Pescaia.

== Production ==
The film is attributable to the trend of sentimental melodramas, commonly called tearjerking, at the time very popular among the Italian public, although frowned upon by contemporary film critics (who only in the seventies revalued these films, specifically coining the term neorealism of appendix).

== Cast ==
- Marco Vicario as Dr. Roberto Ferrero
- Franca Marzi as Franca
- Giovanna Ralli as Luisa
- Saro Urzì as The Mayor
- Edoardo Toniolo as Mr. Fauci
- Pietro Tordi as Dr. Silvestri
