= Barbara Bouchet =

German-Italian actress and entrepreneuse (born 1943)

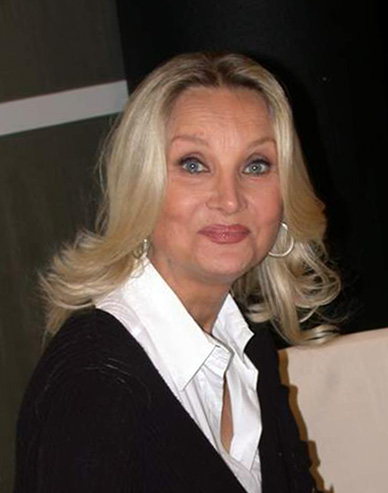
- Bouchet in 2006
- Born: Bärbel Gutscher; 15 August 1943 (age 83); Reichenberg, Sudetenland, Nazi Germany (present-day Czech Republic)
- Occupations: Actress; dancer; model
- Years active: 1959–present
- Spouse: Luigi Borghese (m. 1974; sep. 2006)
- Children: 2, including Alessandro Borghese

Barbara Bouchet (Italian: [ˈbarbara buʃˈʃe, - buʃˈʃɛ]; born Bärbel Gutscher, 15 August 1943) is a German-Italian actress, dancer, and model, active in the United States and Italy. She is regarded as a sex symbol in genre films of the 1960s and 1970s.

Born in German-occupied Czechoslovakia, Bouchet's family immigrated to the United States after the Second World War. She began her acting career in the 1960s, appearing in small roles in films such as In Harm's Way, and guest parts on television series such as Star Trek and The Virginian. She had more prominent film roles in Casino Royale (1967), in which she played Miss Moneypenny, and Sweet Charity (1969).

== Early life ==
Bärbel Gutscher was born in Reichenberg, in the Sudetenland area of Nazi-occupied Czechoslovakia (Liberec, Czech Republic). She had four siblings. Her father, Fritz, was a photographer, and her mother, Ingrid, was an actress.

After World War II, her family was placed in a resettlement camp in the American occupation zone in Germany. They were granted permission to emigrate to the United States under the humanitarian provisions of the Displaced Persons Act of 1948.

After arriving in the United States, the family lived in Five Points, California on the west side of the Central Valley and eventually settled in San Francisco, where Gutscher was raised. During the early 1960s, San Francisco Bay Area television station KPIX-TV ran a show named The KPIX Dance Party and offered Gutscher the opportunity to become a member of the show's dance group.

== Career ==
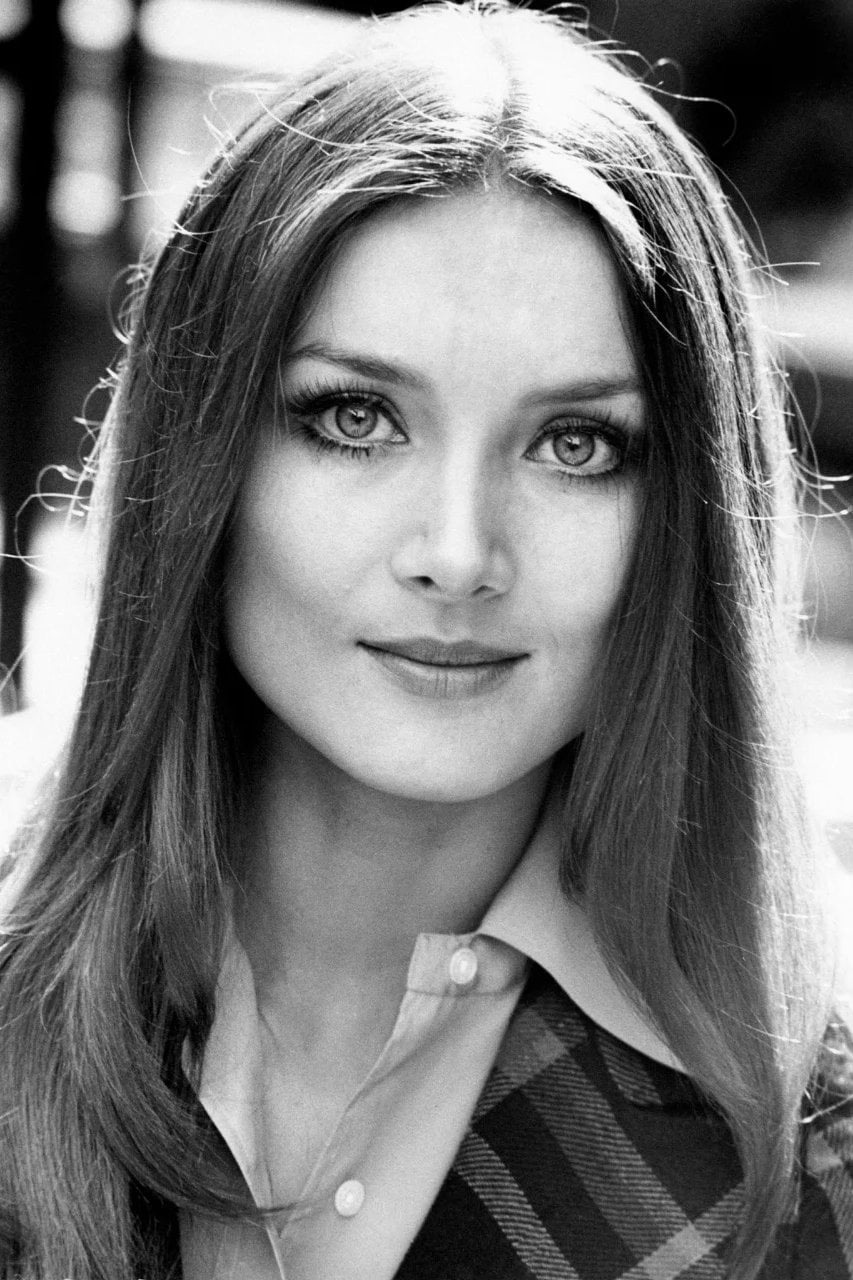
Bouchet in Rome, 1972

Bouchet began her career modelling for magazine covers and appearing in television commercials, before eventually becoming an actress. Her first acting role was a minor part in What a Way to Go! (1964), which led to a series of other roles in the 1960s. She appeared in the films John Goldfarb, Please Come Home (1964), In Harm's Way (1964), and Agent for H.A.R.M. (1966).

She appeared, semi-nude, in two editions of Playboy magazine: May 1965 (stills from In Harm's Way) and February 1967 ("The Girls of Casino Royale").

In Casino Royale (1967), Bouchet played the role of Miss Moneypenny. She guest-starred in the Star Trek episode "By Any Other Name" (1968) as Kelinda, and appeared in the musical film Sweet Charity (1969) playing Ursula.

Bouchet moved to Italy in the 1970s, becoming an Italian citizen and starring in a large number of genre films, including thrillers (gialli), crime films (poliziotteschi), and sex comedies (commedia sexy all'italiana). Her best known appearances in Italian cinema include the films Don't Torture a Duckling (1972), The Red Queen Kills Seven Times (1972) and Caliber 9 (1972).

Bouchet effectively retired from acting in 1982, and in the mid-1980s transitioned to a career producing fitness videos and books and opening a fitness studio in Rome. She has since made some further appearances acting in film and television, including starring with Gregory Peck in The Scarlet and The Black (1983), and a small role in Martin Scorsese's Gangs of New York (2002), playing Mrs. Schermerhorn. Her most recent appearance was as Countess Wiendemar in the 2023 film Diabolik: Who Are You?.

== Personal life ==
In 1974, Bouchet married Luigi Borghese, a producer, with whom she has two sons including celebrity chef Alessandro Borghese. Her husband subsequently produced some of her later films. They separated in 2006, citing different aspirations.

== Filmography ==
=== Films ===
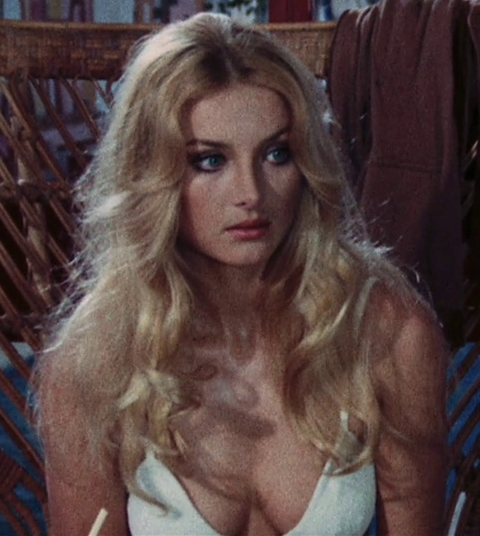
Bouchet in Amuck! (1972)

Year	Title	Role	Notes
1964	A Global Affair	Woman	Cameo appearance
1964	What a Way to Go!	Girl on plane	Cameo appearance
1964	Bedtime Story	German girl	Cameo appearance
1964	Good Neighbor Sam	Receptionist	
1964	Sex and the Single Girl	Photographer	Cameo appearance
1965	John Goldfarb, Please Come Home!	Astrid Porche	
1965	In Harm's Way	Liz Eddington	
1966	Agent for H.A.R.M.	Ava Vestok	
1967	Casino Royale	Moneypenny	
1967	Danger Route	Mari	
1969	Sweet Charity	Ursula	
1970	The Syndicate: A Death in the Family	Monica Brown	
1970	Il debito coniugale	Candida	
1970	The Golden Ass	Pudentilla	
1970	The Swinging Confessors	Mrs. Marchio	
1971	Nights and Loves of Don Juan	Esmeralda Vargas	
1971	The Man with Icy Eyes	Ann Saxe	
1971	Black Belly of the Tarantula	Maria Zani	
1971	Do Not Commit Adultery	Nadine	
1972	Amuck!	Greta Franklin	
1972	Winged Devils	Karin	
1972	Una cavalla tutta nuda	Gemmata	
1972	Caliber 9	Nelly Bordon	
1972	Valerie Inside Outside	Valeria Rocchi	
1972	Casa d'appuntamento	Francine Boulert	
1972	The Red Queen Kills Seven Times	Ketty Wildenbrück	
1972	Master of Love	Lucrezia	
1972	Don't Torture a Duckling	Patrizia	
1972	House of 1000 Pleasures	Mariam	
1972	La calandria	Lucrezia	
1973	Ancora una volta prima di lasciarci	Luisa	
1973	My Pleasure Is Your Pleasure	Prostitute	Cameo appearance
1973	Ricco the Mean Machine	Scilla	
1973	Cry of a Prostitute	Margie	
1974	La badessa di Castro	Elena	
1974	La svergognata	Silvia Lorenzi	
1975	My Mother's Friend	Barbara	
1975	Down the Ancient Staircase	Carla	
1975	Amor vuol dir gelosia	Corinna Borotto	
1975	Duck in Orange Sauce	Patty	
1975	The Hook	Laura Maras	
1976	Sex with a Smile	Barbara	Segment: "I soldi in bocca"
1976	Tutti possono arricchire tranne i poveri	Countess Federici	
1976	Death Rage	Annie	
1976	Sex with a Smile II	Violante	Segment: "L'armadio di Troia"
1977	L'appuntamento	Ingrid	
1978	Blood and Diamonds	Lisa	
1978	How to Lose a Wife and Find a Lover	Eleonora Rubens	
1978	Travolto dagli affetti familiari	Barbara	
1979	Liquirizia	Miss Raffaella	
1979	Saturday, Sunday and Friday	Enza Paternò	Segment: "Sunday"
1980	I'm Photogenic	Herself	Cameo appearance
1981	La moglie in vacanza... l'amante in città	Valeria	
1981	Spaghetti a mezzanotte	Celestre Lagrasta	
1981	Per favore, occupati di Amelia	Amelia	
1981	Crema, cioccolata e… paprika	Eleonora Bonifazi	
1981	Perchè non facciamo l'amore?	Manuela Robelli	
1984	Diamond Connection	Dr. Karen	
2001	Our Tropical Island	Woman on TV show	Cameo appearance
2002	Gangs of New York	Mrs. Schermeron	
2005	Trailer for a Remake of Gore Vidal's Caligula	Caesonia	Short film
2008	Bastardi	Carmen Iuvara	
2009	Butterfly zone - Il senso della farfalla	Woman with moustache	
2009	La vita dispari	Ludovica Levi	
2011	Finalmente la felicità	Herself	Cameo appearance
2015	Darkside Witches	Sibilia	
2015	Madame & Monsieur	Madame	Short film
2017	Easy	Delia	
2017	In Search of Fellini	Hostess	Cameo appearance
2018	Put Grandma in the Freezer	Grandma Birgit	
2020	Calibro 9	Nelly	
2020	Tolo Tolo	Mrs. Inge	
2021	Help! My In-Laws Are Vampires!	Crisilide	
2023	Diabolik: Who Are You?	Countess Wiendemar	

=== Television ===
Year	Title	Role	Notes
1964	The Rogues	Elsa Idonescu	Episode: "Plavonia, Hail and Farewell"
1965	Voyage to the Bottom of the Sea	Tippy Penfield	Episode: "The Left-Handed Man"
1966	The Man from U.N.C.L.E.	Narcissus Darling	Episode: "The Project Deephole Affair"
1967	The Virginian	Marianne	Episode: "The Fortress"
1968	Tarzan	Angela Fraser	Episode: "Jungle Ransom"
1968	Star Trek	Kelinda	Episode: "By Any Other Name"
1972	Cool Million	Carla Miles	Episode: "Mask of Marcella"
1983	The Scarlet and the Black	Minna Kappler	Television film
1983–1984	Beauty Center Show	Herself	Variety show
1993	Quelli della speciale	Adrienne Beauvrais	Recurring role; 3 episodes
1996	Un posto al sole	Delia De La Roche	Series regular
2003	Incantesimo	Jane	Guest role; 2 episodes
2004	Diritto di difesa	Gilardi's mother	Recurring role; 4 episodes
2006	La provinciale	Elvira Coceanu	Television film
2008	Amiche mie	Mariella	Episode: "Giù la maschera"
2008–2010	Ho sposato uno sbirro	Clarissa Morini	Main role; 34 episodes
2010	Capri	Beatrice Maggioni	Episode: "Seconda puntata"
2010	Crimini	Loredana Presutti	Episode: "Little Dream"
2014	Il tredicesimo apostolo	Mrs. Castro	Episode: "Il pianto del demonio"
2019	Un amore da copertina	Betty Richichi	Television film
2020	Ballando con le Stelle	Herself	Contestant (season 15)
2021	Alessandro Borghese: Celebrity Chef	Herself	Contestant (episode 22)
