= Ancora una volta prima di lasciarci =

1973 romance film

- Directed by: Giuliano Biagetti
- Screenplay by: Giuliano Biagetti
- Starring: Barbara Bouchet; Corrado Pani
- Cinematography: Anton Giulio Borghesi
- Edited by: Alberto Moriani
- Music by: Berto Pisano
- Release date: 1973
- Language: Italian

Ancora una volta prima di lasciarci (lit. 'Once again before we part') is a 1973 Italian romantic drama film directed by Giuliano Biagetti and starring Barbara Bouchet and Corrado Pani.

== Cast ==
- Barbara Bouchet as Luisa
- Corrado Pani as Giorgio
- Franco Fabrizi as Marco
- Olga Bisera as Marta
- Antonia Santilli as Dr. Carli
- Barbara Pilavin as Emma
- Eugene Walter as Mr. Macpherson
- Stella Carnacina as Barbie Macpherson
- Piero Maria Rossi as Charlie
- Ada Pometti as the feminist

== Production ==
The film was produced by Bi. Pa. Cinematografica. It had the working title Conoscenza matrimoniale ('Marital acquaintance').

== Reception ==
A La Stampa contemporary review described the film as "an hour and a half [...] of intimacy and at times explicit confessions", "enlivened by a touch of irony and an overabundant dose of nudity", in which "the narrative flows along with ease". The Corriere della Sera's critic Leonardo Autera panned the it, referring to it as "a muddled film, also engaged in a futile search, somewhere between irony and seriousness, for any kind of coherent tone."
