= Hypochondriac (film) =

- Directed by: Tonino Cervi
- Written by: Alberto Sordi; Tonino Cervi; Cesare Frugoni
- Starring: Alberto Sordi; Laura Antonelli; Carlo Bagno; Vittorio Caprioli; Christian De Sica; Laura Lattuada; Eros Pagni; David Pontremoli; Victoria Zinny
- Cinematography: Armando Nannuzzi
- Edited by: Nino Baragli
- Music by: Piero Piccioni
- Release date: 1979
- Running time: 110 min
- Country: Italy
- Language: Italian

Hypochondriac (Italian: Il malato immaginario) is a 1979 Italian comedy film directed by Tonino Cervi. It is a loose adaptation of Molière's The Imaginary Invalid set in 1600 papal Rome.

== Plot ==
In Rome, the rich and stingy landowner Argante believed to be sick in any possible harm, although born as a fish. Another thing that the cruel man holds great attention is his money and his contract with a young doctor for the wedding of his daughter Lucrezia. In fact, the good catch is considered the girl a total moron who knows nothing about medicine, but Don Argante not pay much attention and just think to combine the deal as soon as possible. Meanwhile his wife, without his or her knowledge, betrays him with another. Comes the doctor betrothed his daughter to the house of Argante, as he finds himself in yet another false relapse, and thus begins to visit him. Argante now realizes the nonsense that says the young but is only about money and does not care. Later, between the master and his servant turns a strong argument that Argante is not loved by anyone in the family except by his servants. To test the family Argante is persuaded by the servants to pretend to be dead in order to discover the hatred that his wife and family have of him and so it happens. As if that were not enough rich to the poor has been stolen also deposit money.

== Cast ==
- Alberto Sordi as Don Argante
- Laura Antonelli as Tonietta
- Bernard Blier as Dr. Purgone
- Giuliana De Sio as Angelica
- Marina Vlady as Lucrezia
- Christian De Sica as Claudio Anzalone
- Ettore Manni as the Estate Administrator
- Vittorio Caprioli as Vincenzo
- Stefano Satta Flores as Orlando Mascarelli
- Carlo Bagno as Dr. Anzalone
- Eros Pagni as Dr. Fiorelli

== Production ==
Several years earlier, Cervi offered to produce the film for Marco Ferreri. The role of Argante was initially offered to Nino Manfredi.
