= The House by the Edge of the Lake =

- Directed by: Enzo G. Castellari
- Screenplay by: José María Nunes; Leila Buongiorno
- Story by: José María Nunes
- Produced by: Rodolfo Putignani
- Starring: Vincent Gardenia
- Cinematography: Alejandro Ulloa
- Edited by: Gianfranco Amicucci
- Music by: Guido & Maurizio De Angelis
- Production companies: Cinezeta; Este Films
- Distributed by: Alpherat
- Release dates: 28 September 1979 (Italy); 11 July 1980 (Spain)
- Running time: 96 minutes
- Countries: Italy; Spain

The House by the Edge of the Lake (Italian: Sensitività) is a horror film directed by Enzo G. Castellari.

The film was re-edited several years after, with the title Kyra, La signora del lago (Kyra, the Lady of the Lake). The director Castellari defined that film as an "awful horror film with a very low cost budget".

== Cast ==
- Vincent Gardenia as Old painter
- Leonora Fani as Lilian
- Wolfango Soldati as Edoardo
- Patricia Adriani as Lilith
- Caterina Boratto as Kira
- Massimo Vanni as Manuel

== Production ==
Director Enzo G. Castellari explained that the film was developed between his friendship with an aspiring film maker named Jose Sanchez. Castellari met him through his doctor and started teaching him how to write a script and took him on as an assistant. Castellari stated that his script was being finished for a Spanish producer to be shot in Costa Brava which led to Castellari taking charge in directing the film. Castellari's recollections are at odds with the film's credits which credit the film to Jose Maria Nunes a writer and director who was active in the film business since the 1950s with Sanchez only being credited as an actor in a small role.

Filming began in August 1978 in Costa Brava but halted shortly after as the money for the film ran out. Castellari did not initially want his named attached to the film, but in order to gain more funds he obliged to having his name attached to the project.

== Release ==
The House by the Edge of the Lake was released in Italy on 28 September 1979. It was released in Spain as Diabla on 11 July 1980. Distributor Rodolfo Putignani invested money his company Cinezeta created the Italian title for the film Sensivita, a word that does not exist in Italian. Castellari found that as soon as editing the film, problems with distribution began which led to further interruptions in filming. Castellari stated that "[Distributor Rodolfo]Putignani and his associate Curti finished it their own way. But my name as director stayed."

The film was re-released in 1986 with additional scenes shot by Alfonso Brescia with editing credited to "Jeffrey Bogart". Castellari did not like the re-edit of the film, recalling he was invited to a horror convention where the film was screened and that "after six minutes I walked [out of] the theater, horrified."
