= Apache Woman (1976 film) =

1976 film

- Directed by: Giorgio Mariuzzo
- Written by: Giorgio Mariuzzo; Antonio Racioppi
- Starring: Al Cliver
- Cinematography: Sergio Rubini
- Edited by: Mario Morra
- Music by: Rudy Maglioni
- Release date: 1976
- Language: Italian

Apache Woman (Italian: Una donna chiamata Apache) is a 1976 Italian Spaghetti Western film, written and directed by Giorgio Mariuzzo.

== Cast ==
- Al Cliver as Tommy
- Clara Hopf as Sunsirahè
- Corrado Olmi as Honest Jeremy
- Federico Boido as Keith
- Stefano Oppedisano as Frankie
- Mario Maranzana as Snake
- Pietro Mazzinghi as The Preacher Masters
- Ely Galleani as The Preacher's Daughter
