= Tonino Cervi =

Italian film director, screenwriter and producer

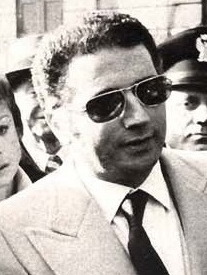
- Cervi in 1974
- Born: 4 June 1929; Rome, Kingdom of Italy
- Died: 1 April 2002 (aged 72); Rome, Italy
- Resting place: Cimitero Flaminio, Rome
- Occupations: Film director; screenwriter; film producer
- Children: 3, including Valentina
- Parents: Gino Cervi (father); Ninì Gordini (mother)

Antonio "Tonino" Cervi (4 June 1929 – 1 April 2002) was an Italian film director, screenwriter and producer.

== Life and career ==
Born in Rome, Cervi was the son of actor Gino Cervi and father of Antonia Cervi, Antonio Levesi Cervi, Stefano Cervi and actress Valentina Cervi. He made his debut as a film producer in 1952, with La peccatrice dell'isola by Sergio Corbucci; among others, he produced works of Michelangelo Antonioni, Federico Fellini, Bernardo Bertolucci, Mauro Bolognini, Francesco Rosi, Mario Monicelli.

Cervi made his directional debut with the spaghetti Western Today We Kill... Tomorrow We Die! starring Bud Spencer; among his films two box office hits both starring Alberto Sordi, The Miser and Hypochondriac.

Cervi died in Rome of a heart attack on 1 April 2002, at the age of 72.

== Selected filmography ==
As director

- Today We Kill... Tomorrow We Die! (1968)
- Queens of Evil (1970)
- La nottata (1975)
- Nest of Vipers (1978)
- Hypochondriac (1979)
- Il turno (1981)
- Sole nudo (1984)
- The Miser (1990)
- Household Accounts (2003)
