= Durfort-Lacapelette =

- Commune
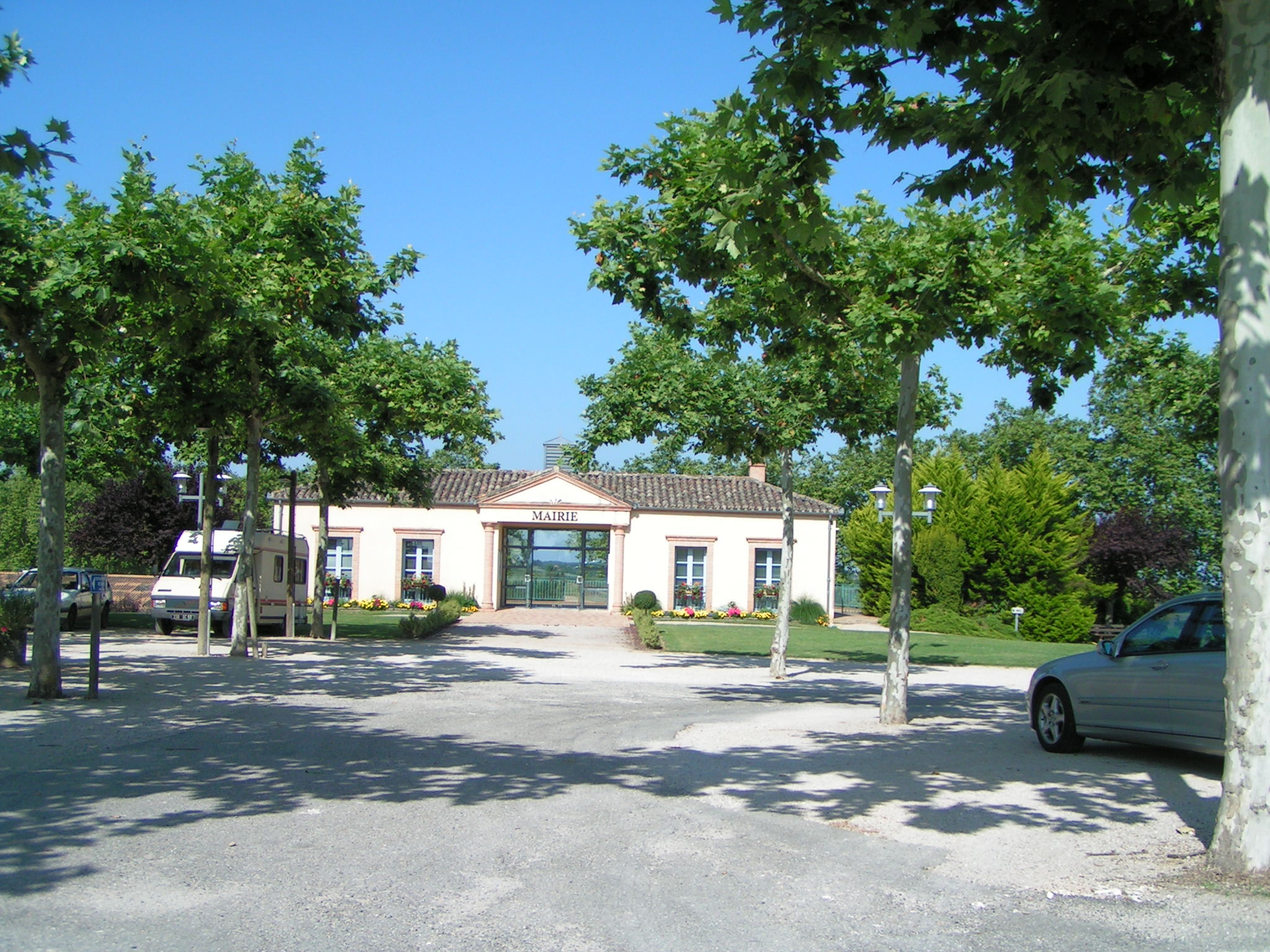
- Durfort-Lacapelette town hall
- Location of Durfort-Lacapelette
- Location within France Location within Occitanie
- Coordinates: 44°11′14″N 1°09′20″E
- Country: France
- Region: Occitania
- Department: Tarn-et-Garonne
- Arrondissement: Castelsarrasin
- Canton: Pays de Serres Sud-Quercy

Government
  - Mayor (2020–2026): Dominique Forneris
- Area^{1}: 35.83 km^{2} (13.83 sq mi)
- Elevation: 195 m (640 ft)
- Highest elevation: 205 m (673 ft)
- Lowest elevation: 91 m (299 ft)
- Population (2023): 840
  - Density: 23/km^{2} (61/sq mi)
- Time zone: UTC+01:00 (CET)
  - Summer (DST): UTC+02:00 (CEST)
- INSEE/Postal code: 82051 /82390
- ^{1} French Land Register data, which excludes lakes, ponds, glaciers > 1 km^{2} (0.386 sq mi or 247 acres) and river estuaries.

Durfort-Lacapelette (French pronunciation: [dyʁfɔʁ lakaplɛt]; Languedocien: Durfòrt e la Capeleta) is a commune in the Tarn-et-Garonne department in the Occitanie region in southern France.

== Geography ==
The Barguelonne river forms all of the commune's northern border.

== See also ==
- Communes of the Tarn-et-Garonne department
