= Giuliano Biagetti =

Italian film director and screenwriter

- Born: 12 April 1925; La Spezia
- Died: 29 March 1998 (aged 72); Rome
- Occupations: Film director and screenwriter

Giuliano Biagetti (12 April 1925 – 29 March 1998) was an Italian film director and screenwriter.

== Life and career ==
Born in La Spezia into a family of Pisan origins, Biagetti studied medicine at the University of Pisa, and during this time he founded the stage company "The brigade of Doctors", for which he wrote several comic-grotesque plays. He moved to Rome in the early fifties, and there he had some experience as a documentarist and as an assistant director of notable directors including Joseph Losey, Giorgio Ferroni, Giacomo Gentilomo and Roberto Rossellini, who produced and wrote the feature film debut of Biagetti, the melodrama Rivalità. After a badly distributed second work Biagetti abandoned films, devoting himself to the production and direction of commercials. He came back to cinema in 1968, directing two commercially successful films which had some political and social commitment, then since 1972 he focused on more low-profile genre films, in which he was sometimes credited as Pier Giorgio Ferretti.

== Filmography ==
- Rivalry (1953)
- Ragazze al mare (1956)
- Love Problems (1968)
- Interrabang (1969)
- Decameroticus (1972)
- Ancora una volta prima di lasciarci (1973)
- Il sergente Rompiglioni (1973)
- La svergognata (1974)
- La novizia (1975)
- Donna... cosa si fa per te (1976)
- L'appuntamento (1977)
- Vado a riprendermi il gatto (1987)
- Sì, ma vogliamo un maschio (1994)
