= Gino Pagnani =

Italian actor and voice actor

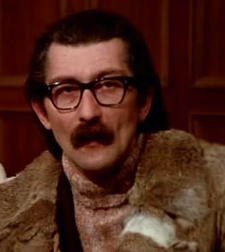
- Born: Luigi Pagnani Fusconi; 31 July 1927; Rome, Italy
- Died: 10 April 2010 (aged 82); Magliano Sabina, Italy
- Occupations: Actor, voice actor
- Years active: 1968-1991

Gino Pagnani (born Luigi Pagnani Fusconi; 31 July 1927 – 10 April 2010) was an Italian actor and voice actor. He appeared in more than fifty films from 1968 to 1991.

== Career ==
A cousin of actress Andreina Pagnani, Pagnani started his career in the avanspettacolo, where he worked with Fredo Pistoni and the Rizzo brothers Alfredo and Carlo. His breakthrough came in 1966, with the musical comedy Rinaldo in campo. He also founded a stage company with Umberto D'Orsi and Cesare Gelli, and was part of Il Bagaglino.

In films, Pagnani was mainly active as a character actor, frequently appearing in comedy films starring Franco and Ciccio. In 1984, he retired from acting to work as a dubbing director and a dubber.

== Filmography ==
Year	Title	Role	Notes
1968	Il professor Matusa e i suoi hippies		
1970	Let's Have a Riot	Colleague of Beretta	Uncredited
1970	Ma chi t'ha dato la patente?		
1970	Due bianchi nell'Africa nera	Corporal with glasses	
1971	Una prostituta al servizio del pubblico e in regola con le leggi dello stato		
1971	Mazzabubù... quante corna stanno quaggiù?	The bespectacled Husband with moustache	
1971	Ma che musica maestro	Gennarino Eccellenza	
1971	Armiamoci e partite!	French Captain with facial-tic	
1971	Il clan dei due Borsalini	Prof. Galli	Uncredited
1972	Ubalda, All Naked and Warm	Mastro Deodato	
1972	Canterbury proibito	Brunetto	(segment "Viola")
1972	Continuavano a chiamarli i due piloti più matti del mondo		
1972	Continuavano a chiamarli... er più e er meno	Police commissioner	
1973	Ku-Fu? Dalla Sicilia con furore	Tutti Li Tui	
1973	Bella, ricca, lieve difetto fisico, cerca anima gemella	Doctor	
1973	The Inconsolable Widow Thanks All Those Who Consoled Her	Picciotto	
1973	Il magnate		
1973	Giovannona Long-Thigh	Hearse Driver helping Albertini	
1973	Man Called Invincible	Party guest	
1973	Hospitals: The White Mafia	Man with glasses in waiting-room	Uncredited
1973	The Lady Has Been Raped	Tommasino	
1974	Di Tresette ce n'è uno, tutti gli altri son nessuno	Asylum Keyguard	
1974	Piedino il questurino	Spacciatore	
1974	Farfallon	Capo delle guardie svizzere	
1974	Don't Hurt Me, My Love	Taxi Driver	
1974	L'eredità dello zio buonanima	L'avvocato	Uncredited
1975	Mark of Zorro	Pachito	
1975	L'educanda		
1975	Due cuori, una cappella	Padre di Ines	
1975	The Flower in His Mouth	Profumo	
1975	Strip First, Then We Talk	Otello	
1975	Il giustiziere di mezzogiorno	Capo dei padri di famiglia	
1976	Confessions of a Lady Cop	Cecè's Friend	Uncredited
1976	Live Like a Cop, Die Like a Man	Paul	
1976	La professoressa di scienze naturali	Client of chemist's shop	
1976	Classe mista	Felice's Assistant	
1976	La principessa sul pisello	Brother of Maurice	
1976	La cameriera nera	Antenore	
1976	Il sergente Rompiglioni	Antonio Fagotto	
1976	Meet Him and Die		
1976	La clinica dell'amore	Investigator's Assistant	
1976	Cuginetta, amore mio!	Leonida / Elvira's husband	
1977	Nerone	Tigellino's Informer	Uncredited
1977	Il marito in collegio		
1977	Gli uccisori		
1977	Gangbuster	Cab driver	
1978	Last Feelings	Giovanni	
1978	Scherzi da prete		
1979	Saturday, Sunday and Friday	Zaikoto's employee	
1979	The Nurse in the Military Madhouse	Ottavio	
1979	Tutti a squola	Carabiniere	
1979	L'imbranato		
1979	L'albero della maldicenza		
1980	Ciao marziano	Il questore	
1980	L'insegnante al mare con tutta la classe	School teacher from Veneto	
1980	Sugar, Honey and Pepper		
1980	Con la zia non è peccato	Alfredo	
1981	La dottoressa di campagna	Carmelo	
1981	La dottoressa preferisce i marinai	The flatulent Man	
1984	L'allenatore nel pallone	Dott. Socrates	
