= Catullo =

Catullo is an Italian given name and surname. Notable people with the name include:

== Surname ==
- Daniel Catullo, American concert promoter, director, and producer
- Gaio Valerio Catullo (c. 84 – c. 54 BC), known as Catullus, Latin poet of the late Roman Republic
- Lucia Catullo (1927–1985), Italian actress and dancer
- Tomaso Catullo (1782–1869), Venetian physician, geologist, paleontologist, zoologist and educator in the Università di Padova

== Given name ==
- Catullo Ciacci (1934–1996), Italian racing cyclist
- Livio Catullo Stecchini (1913–1979), Italian professor of ancient history at Paterson State Teachers College in New Jersey
