= Joseph Hooker (disambiguation) =

Joseph Hooker (1814-1879) was a U.S. Army officer and major general in the Union Army during the American Civil War.

Joseph Hooker or Joe Hooker may also refer to:

- Harve Pierre, also known as Joe Hooker, record producer, writer and singer & Vice-President of Bad Boy Records
- Joseph Dalton Hooker, English botanist
- Joseph Lee Hooker, American singer and songwriter
