= Nico Fidenco =

Italian singer and composer (1933–2022)

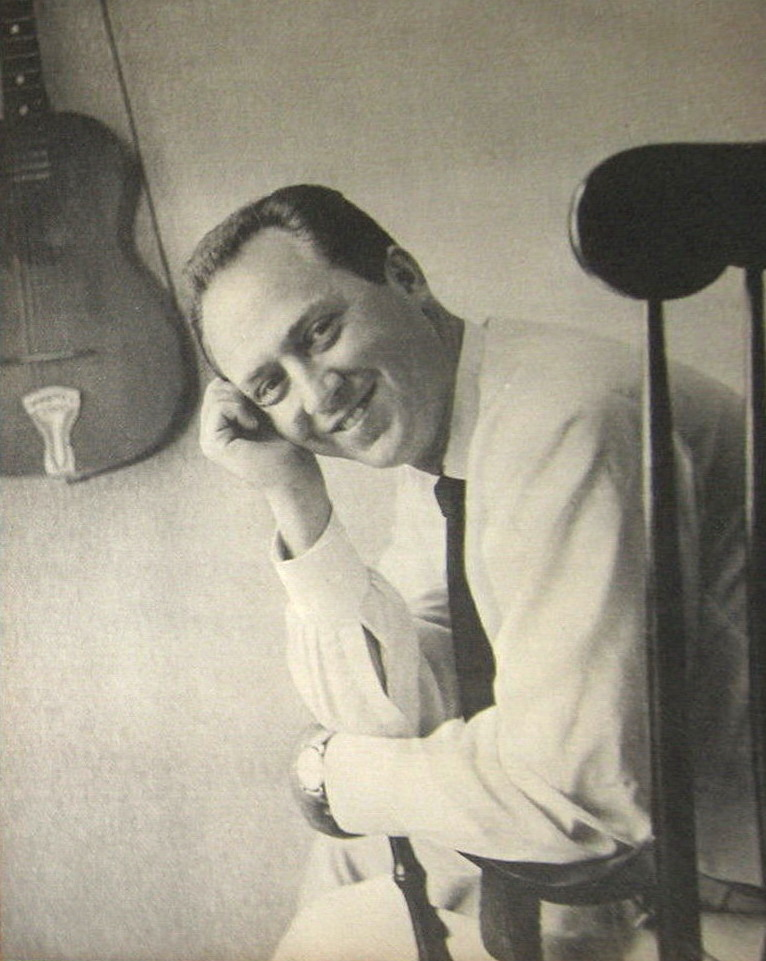
- Fidenco in 1961

Background information
- Born: Domenico Colarossi; 24 January 1933; Rome, Kingdom of Italy
- Died: 18 November 2022 (aged 89) Rome, Italy
- Genre: Pop
- Occupations: Singer; composer
- Years active: 1960–1998

Domenico Colarossi (24 January 1933 – 18 November 2022), known professionally as Nico Fidenco, was an Italian singer and film soundtrack composer who gained considerable popularity in 1960 with the release of the song "What a Sky" (Italian: "Su nel cielo"), taken from the film Silver Spoon Set by Francesco Maselli.

Self-taught in music, Fidenco did a few cover versions of film title songs for the Italian market. With the song "Legata a un granello di sabbia", he was the first Italian singer to sell one million copies of a single. This interest in cinema led him to be a prolific soundtrack composer, including scores for westerns and many Joe D'Amato films.

== Selected filmography ==
Year	Film	Directed by	Notes	Latest CD / Digital Release
1962	Two Samurai For 100 Geisha	Giorgio Simonelli		Digitmovies / CDDM283 / 2016
1964	Destination Miami: Objective Murder	Piero Regnoli		
1965	In a Colt's Shadow	Gianni Grimaldi		GDM / GDM 2086 / 2007
1966	Dynamite Jim	Alfonso Balcázar		GDM / GDM 4141 / 2011
1966	Star Pilot	Pietro Francisci		Digitmovies / CDDM161 / 2010
1966	The Texican	Lesley Selander		GDM / GDM 4121 / 2008
1966	Ypotron - Final Countdown	Giorgio Stegani		GDM / CD CLUB 7097 / 2010
1966	Taste for Killing	Tonino Valerii		GDM / GDM 4137 / 2010
1967	Bang Bang Kid	Giorgio Gentili, Luciano Lelli	With Gianni Dell'Orso	GDM / GDM 2075 / 2006
1967	The Ten Million Dollar Grab	Bitto Albertini		Beat Records Company / BCM 9506 / 2012
1967	John the Bastard (film)	Armando Crispino		GDM / GDM 2075 / 2006
1968	Bury Them Deep	Paolo Moffa		GDM / GDM 4102 / 2007
1968	I Want Him Dead	Paolo Bianchini		GDM / GDM 4101 / 2007
1968	Bloody Che Contra	Paolo Heusch		Beat Records Company / BCM 9513 / 2012
1968	To Hell and Back (1968 film)	Giovanni Fago		GDM / GDM 4103 / 2007
1968	Ragan	José Briz Méndez, Luciano Lelli	With Gianni Dell'Orso	GDM / CD CLUB 7055 / 2008
1968	1001 Nights	José María Elorrieta	With Gianni Dell'Orso	GDM / CD CLUB 7055 / 2008
1970	When Heroes Die	José Luis Merino		GDM / GDM 4305 / 2013
1971	The Inhibitions of Doctor Gaudenzi, Widower, With the Buonanima Complex	Gianni Grimaldi		GDM / GDM 4206 / 2011
1973	Those Dirty Dogs	Giuseppe Rosati		Beat Records Company / CDCR 108 / 2011
1973	Supermen Against the Orient	Bitto Albertini, Kuei Chi-hung		
1974	Judas kills on Friday	Stelvio Massi		Kronos Records / KRONGOLD029 / 2018
1974	Monika	Mario Imperoli		Digitmovies / DGST009 / 2015
1975	Black Emanuelle	Bitto Albertini		Beat Records Company / CDCR 101 / 2009
1975	Blue Jeans	Mario Imperoli		Digitmovies / CDDM0304 / 2019
1975	Bruna, Shapely, Seeks Gifted	Alberto Cardone		CAM / Digital / 2025
1975	The Sweet Aunts	Mario Imperoli		CAM / Digital / 2025
1976	The Young Bride	Sergio Bergonzelli		CAM / Digital / 2025
1976	My Sister in Law	Lucio Fulci		
1976	Emanuelle in Bangkok	Joe D'Amato		Beat Records Company / CDCR 103 / 2010
1977	Emanuelle in America	Joe D'Amato		Beat Records Company / CDCR 102 / 2010
1977	Emanuelle Around the World	Joe D'Amato		Beat Records Company / CDCR 104 / 2010
1977	Emanuelle and the Last Cannibals	Joe D'Amato		Beat Records Company / CDCR 105 / 2010
1978	Emanuelle and the White Slave Trade	Joe D'Amato		Beat Records Company / CDCR 106 / 2010
1978	Candido Erotico	Claudio Giorgi		Beat Records Company / DDJ036 / 2014
1978	Cugine mie	Marcello Avallone		
1979	Images in a Convent	Joe D'Amato		Kronos Records / KRONGOLD005 / 2014
1979	Eros Perversion	Ron Wertheim	aka William Shakespeare's Twelfth Night	Beat Records Company / DDJ017 / 2012
1979	3 Supermen Against Godfather	Italo Martinenghi		Beat Records Company / DDJ031 / 2013
1980	The Women Of Quiet Country	Claudio Giorgi		Digitmovies / DGST004 / 2021
1980	Sesso nero	Joe D'Amato		Beat Records Company / DDJ026 / 2013
1980	Zombie Holocaust	Marino Girolami		Beat Records Company / DDJ034 / 2014
1981	Porno Holocaust	Joe D'Amato		Beat Records Company / DDJ015 / 2012
1981	The Porn Detectives	Claudio Bernabei, Joe D'Amato		CAM / Digital / 2025
1982	What a mess ... with Pierino!	Bitto Albertini		Beat Records Company / DDJ031 / 2013

== Discography ==
=== 45 rpm singles ===
- 1960: What a Sky / Su nel cielo RCA Italiana 45N 1109
- 1961: Just that Same Old Line / Trust Me RCA Italiana 45N 1122
- 1961: Non è vero / Una voce d'angelo RCA Italiana 45N 1127
- 1961: Il mondo di Suzie Wong / Tornerai... Suzie RCA Italiana 45N 1144
- 1961: Ghinza Street / Ghinza Street (strumentale) RCA Italiana 45N 1155
- 1961: Legata a un granello di sabbia / Ridi, ridi RCA Italiana PM45-1166
- 1961: Exodus / Come nasce un amore RCA Serie Europa PM45-3000
- 1962: Little Grain of Sand / Ridi, ridi RCA Italiana PM45-3033
- 1962: La scala di seta / Tra le piume di una rondine RCA Serie Europa PM45-3042
- 1962: Colazione da Tiffany (Moon River) / Audrey RCA Victor Serie Europa PM45-3044
- 1962: Lasciami il tuo sorriso / C'è una leggenda RCA Victor Serie Europa PM45-3099
- 1963: Tutta la gente / Lejos me voy RCA Italiana PM45-3133
- 1963: Una donna nel mondo / Perché non piango più RCA Italiana PM45-3167
- 1963: Tutta la gente / Mondo meraviglioso RCA Italiana PM45-3169
- 1963: Se mi perderai / Goccia di mare RCA Italiana PM45-3199
- 1964: Cleopatra / Non mi chiedi mai RCA Italiana PM45-3222
- 1964: Hud / Ciò che rimane alla fine di un amore RCA Italiana PM45-3224
- 1964: Con te sulla spiaggia / Mi devi credere RCA Italiana PM45-3255
- 1965: A casa d'Irene / Ma dai RCA Italiana PM45-3299
- 1965: L'uomo che non sapeva amare / Tu non sei l'altra RCA Italiana PM45-3311
- 1965: La voglia di ballare / Celestina RCA Italiana PM45-3314
- 1966: Jean Harlow la donna che non sapeva amare / Luna malinconica (Blue Moon) RCA Italiana PM45-3328
- 1966: Lord Jim / Diciamoci ciao RCA Italiana PM45-3338
- 1966: All'ombra di una Colt / Finché il mondo sarà RCA Italiana PM45-3340
- 1966: Cammina cammina / Non scherzare con il fuoco RCA Italiana PM45-3356
- 1966: Che cos'è l'amore / File di automobili RCA Italiana PM45-3365
- 1966: Corri / Guantanamera RCA Italiana PM45-3373
- 1967: Ma piano (per non svegliarmi/Una telefonata) Parade PRC 5025
- 1967: Cara felicità/Siamo stati innamorati Parade PRC 5034
- 1967: Qualche stupido "ti amo"(somethin'stupid)/E venne la notte Parade PRC 5040 – Cantata con "Fulvia"
- 1967: Ci vediamo stasera/La ballata del treno Parade PRC 5049
- 1968: Va ragazzo/Legata a un granello di sabbia RCA Italiana PM 3470
- 1968: La morale della favola/Sonia Fonit SPF 31225
- 1969: Oramai sto con lei/Ti ricordi RCA Italiana PM 3484
- 1970: Tu ed io...io e te/Quando il treno partirà Ri-Fi RPN NP 16419
- 1971: Nun è straniero/Il colore dell'addio Ri-Fi RNP NP 16452
- 1971: Una stagione all'inferno/Il colore dell'addio Ri-Fi RPN NP 16454
- 1976: Nina/Balla con me...dai – Super five record SFR 9201
- 1979: Don Chuck castoro/Pierino a quadretti (con la partecipazione del coro de I castorini) – Meeting Music/CLS – MMC 101
- 1979: Don Chuck story/Zawa zawa – Meeting Music/CLS – MMC 117
- 1980: Arnold/Ma le gambe – Flash Cinema TV/RCA – ZBFH 7202
- 1980: Fantasupermega/Godzilla – Gudzuki – Godzilla (con la partecipazione de Il coro dei bambini di Renata Cortiglioni) – CBS – CBS 8506
- 1981: Stardust/Ciao Brasile! – WEA – T 18855
- 1981: Jeremy and Jenny destra-sinistra/Bem – WEA – T 18856
- 1982: Hela/Microsuperman – Traccia/Fonit-Cetra – TRS 1016
- 1982: Cyborg i nove supermagnifici/Chappy (I cavalieri del re) – RCA Original cast – BB 6605
- 1982: Sam, il ragazzo del west/Mimì e la nazionale di pallavolo (Giorgia Lepore) – RCA Original cast – BB 6622
- 1989: Direzione vietata/sogno una sola città – Iperspazio – IPN 892

=== EP ===
- 1961: Exodus RCA Italiana EPA 30 – 401

=== Albums ===
- 1961: Nico Fidenco RCA Serie Europa PML 10131
- 1963: Per noi due RCA Italiana PML 10366
- 1963: Successi da Cinelandia RCA Italiana APLM 10390
- 1964: Musica per innamorati RCA Italiana APML 10399
- 1964: La bella musica italiana RCA Italiana QKAP 11742
- 1965: Nico Fidenco Show RCA Italiana Special S 5
- 1973: La mia estate con Cinzia – Ri-Fi – RFL ST 14046
- 1977: Gli anni d'oro di Nico Fidenco – RCA Lineatre/RCA – NL 33043
- 1981: La mia mania – WEA T 58416
- 1984: Super4 Siglaquattro/RCA – SIG 1021 (with Jimmy Fontana, Gianni Meccia and Riccardo Del Turco)
- 1992: Ieri e oggi – Centotre MFLP 021
- 1994: TiVulandia – volume 1 – RCA Original Cast/BMG – 74321-21094-2
- 1994: TiVulandia – volume 2 – RCA Original Cast/BMG – 74321-21095-2
- 1996: Legata a un granello di sabbia – Supermusic/Duck Records
- 2002: Nico Fidenco – I grandi successi originali
- 2003: TiVulandia – volume 4 – RCA/BMG Italia – 82876538582
