= Le dolci zie =

1975 film by Mario Imperoli

- Italian theatrical release poster
- Directed by: Mario Imperoli
- Written by: Mario Imperoli; Piero Regnoli
- Story by: Mario Imperoli; Marino Onorati
- Starring: Pascale Petit; Femi Benussi
- Cinematography: Fausto Zuccoli
- Edited by: Otello Colangeli
- Music by: Nico Fidenco
- Release date: 1975
- Language: Italian

Le dolci zie (i.e. "The Sweet Aunts") is a 1975 commedia sexy all'italiana written and directed by Mario Imperoli and starring Pascale Petit, Femi Benussi, and Marisa Merlini.

== Plot ==
When young Libero loses his parents he is taken in by his disreputable atheist grandfather and the girl who shares his life, previously a prostitute, on their farm. However, the court decides that until he comes of age he must be brought up by his three unmarried aunts, all of impeccable morals, and with the help of a priest and a policeman the three remove him to their home. The eldest sister has long given up hope of finding a husband, but the two younger and prettier ones are excited by the handsome newcomer and in making a great fuss of him arouse his masculinity. One of them gives music lessons and one of her pupils, closer to Libero's age, sets her sights on him. The grandfather is happy to see the boy matched with anybody other than the aunts he despises as devout virgins and hypocrites.

== Cast ==
- Femi Benussi as Mimì
- Pascale Petit as Benedetta
- Marisa Merlini as Fiorella
- Jean-Claude Vernè as Libero
- Patrizia Gori as Anna
- Mario Maranzana as Grandpa
- Orchidea De Santis as Manuela
- Pupo De Luca as Don Fiorello

== See also ==
- List of Italian films of 1975
