= Lucia Catullo =

Italian actress and dancer (1927–1985)

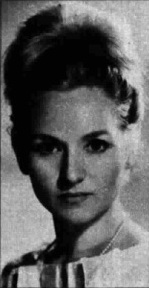
- Born: 10 September 1927; Bari, Italy
- Died: 31 December 1985 (aged 58); Narni, Italy
- Occupation: actress
- Years active: 1955-1985

Lucia Catullo (10 September 1927 – 31 December 1985) was an Italian actress and dancer known primarily for playing dramatic roles in the Radiotelevisione Italiana.

== Biography ==
Lucia was born in Bari, Italy, and studied at the Accademia Nazionale di Arte Drammatica Silvio D'Amico. His theater debut was in Teatro Stabile di Torino, and her television debut was playing a small role in Macbeth, an Italian version produced by the RAI in 1960.

His film work includes Monika, directed by Mario Imperoli, and Terrible Day of the Big Gundown, a Spaghetti Western directed by Sergio Garrone.

== Filmography ==
Year	Title	Role	Note
1960	Macbeth	?	RAI
1963	La ragazza di fabbrica	Lelja	RAI
1965	Resurrezione	Natalija Ivanovna	RAI
1967	1898: Processo a Don Albertario	Anna Kuliscioff	RAI
1971	Quel maledetto giorno della resa dei conti	Hannah Benton	
1972	Le inchieste del commissario Maigret	Germaine Rivaud	RAI
1973	ESP	inspector's wife	RAI
1974	La ragazzina	?	
1974	Sotto il placido Don	Tolstoy's wife	RAI
1977	Il commissario De Vincenzi	Telma Mauri	RAI
1981	La casa rossa	Ada	RAI
