= Risking =

Risking may refer to:

- The concept of Risk
- The 1976 film Pronto ad uccidere, also released as Risking.
