= Oasis of Fear =

1971 giallo film

- Original Italian film poster
- Italian: Un posto ideale per uccidere
- Directed by: Umberto Lenzi
- Written by: Umberto Lenzi; Lucia Drudi Demby; Antonio Altoviti
- Produced by: Carlo Ponti
- Starring: Irene Papas; Ornella Muti; Ray Lovelock
- Cinematography: Alfio Contini
- Edited by: Eugenio Alabiso
- Music by: Bruno Lauzi
- Release date: 1971 (Italy)
- Running time: 90 minutes
- Countries: Italy; France

Oasis of Fear (Italian: Un posto ideale per uccidere, lit. 'An Ideal Place to Kill') is a 1971 giallo film directed and co-written by Umberto Lenzi, and starring Irene Papas, Ray Lovelock and Ornella Muti.

An Italian and French co-production, the film was released to Italian theatres in 1971.

== Synopsis ==
Two pornography-peddling hippies (Richard and Ingrid) run out of material to sell, so they start taking "dirty pictures" of each other to add to their stock of smut. While on the run from the authorities in Sweden, the pair get invited to the home of a middle-aged woman named Barbara, the wife of a NATO colonel. She involves them first in sexual games, then later in a convoluted murder plot. It seems Barbara has murdered her husband and hidden the body in the trunk of her car, and she gets the idea to frame the two hippies for the crime.

== Cast ==
- Irene Papas as Barbara Slesar
- Ray Lovelock as Dick Butler
- Ornella Muti as Ingrid Sjoman
- Calisto Calisti as Police Inspector
- Michel Bardinet as Baratti
- Antonio Mellino as Agostino
- Sal Borgese as friend of Agostino
- Umberto Raho
- Jacques Stany
- Umberto D'Orsi
- Tom Felleghi
- Franco Ressel

== Production ==
The film was developed under the title Stress. Producer Carlo Ponti liked director Umberto Lenzi's previous films like Orgasmo. Lenzi's contract with Ponti was about to expire and he would lose money so Lenzi hastily devised a story which borrowed themes from Orgasmo with some road movie elements. Lenzi's story originally included references to drugs, an element which would have caused issues with the ratings board, which led to Ponti getting Tonino Guerra who advised the director to change drugs with pornography.

Ponti initially wanted Carrol Baker to be in the film, as she had in previous thrillers from Lenzi, while Lenzi wanted American soprano Anna Moffo. Moffo backed out on the film a few days before shooting and was replaced by Ponti with Irene Papas who Lenzi felt was not appropriate for the role. Lenzi said he had trouble getting actress Irene Papas to participate in the threesome scene that takes place in the film. Papas wouldn't do nude scenes for the film, leading to re-organize some scenes and use a body double for some scenes.

Lead actor Ray Lovelock sings a song called "How Can You Live Your Life?" over the opening titles, accompanied by a sitar; a song that reoccurs throughout the film in different versions, supposedly with the purpose of trying to capture the "feel" of the 1960s hippie scene.

== Release and reception ==
Oasis of Fear was released in Italy in 1971. From contemporary reviews, historian and critic Roberto Curti described the film as being a "critical and commercial flop." It grossed less than 92 million Italian lire. The film was released in the United States in 1974, and is available on video as both Oasis of Fear and Dirty Pictures.

Lenzi later dismissed the film, stating that "If I could burn that film, I'd do it!"

== See also ==
- List of Italian films of 1971
