= Lilli Carati =

Italian mainstream and pornographic actress (1956–2014)

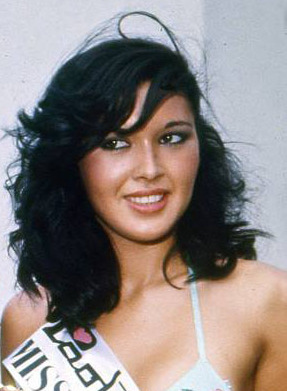
- Carati in 1974
- Born: 23 September 1956; Varese, Italy
- Died: 21 October 2014 (aged 58); Varese, Italy
- Other name: Lilly Carati

Lilli Carati (23 September 1956 – 21 October 2014) was an Italian actress.

== Biography ==
Lilli Carati was born in Varese, Italy. In 1974, she was named "Miss Elegance Lombardy" at a beauty contest and began working as a fashion model in Milan. She was first runner-up at Miss Italia contest of 1974 in Calabria and moved on to cinema.

Most of her box office hits were in the genre of commedia sexy all'italiana, but she also appeared in films of different genres such as Squadra antifurto (1977, a crime story with Tomas Milian), Le evase – Storie di sesso e di violenze (1978, a prototypical exploitation film), and La fine del mondo nel nostro solito letto in una notte piena di pioggia (1978, a film by Lina Wertmüller). She also appeared in nude photos on the pages of Italian men's magazines like Playmen and Albo Blitz.

After a soft-core film entitled Lilli Carati's Dream by Giorgio Grand (1987), the actress moved on to the porn genre, starring in five films in total, four directed by Grand himself, shot between 1987 and 1988, in which she also worked with Rocco Siffredi at the beginning of his career, and the last in 1989, in the United States of America, directed by Alex de Renzy and Henri Pachard. He also created numerous hardcore photo shoots for the magazine Le Ore.

Around 1990, she retired from public life. On 21 October 2014, she died of a brain tumour.

== Films ==
Her first lead role was in 1976's La professoressa di scienze naturali ("School Days") by Michele Massimo Tarantini. In this film, Carati plays a substitute teacher of natural science named Stefania Marini who soon gets one of her students, Andrea (Marco Gelardini), as her lover and a physician Baron Cacciapuopolo (Michele Gammino) as an admirer. In the end, she marries the Baron but keeps Andrea as a lover.

Her next "school film" was La compagna di banco by Mariano Laurenti in 1977. In this film, Carati is a rich schoolgirl and a basketball player named Simona Girardi with a lover named Mario (Antonio Melidoni). Alvaro Vitali, a regular of school films, is present in both films as the main comic character. The same year she played Paola in the poliziotteschi film Gangbuster.

In 1978, in Candido Erotico (Copenhagen Nights) by Claudio de Molinis, she plays Charlotte, a young student who is drawn into confusion when she falls in love with her stepmother's lover, Carlo (Mircha Carven) who works as an actor in sex shows. Eventually, she discovers the ménage à trois involving her father, stepmother, and Carlo and decides to carry on with her relationship.

Her greatest success came with Avere vent'anni ("To Be Twenty") by Fernando Di Leo in 1978. The film, about the story of two girls who leave home and move into a hippie commune in pursuit of freedom but end up in the hands of thugs to be violently murdered, later attained a cult status as expressed by its screening at Venice Film Festival in 2004. The film contains a brief lesbian sex scene.

In Il corpo della ragassa (1979) by Pasquale Festa Campanile, Carati plays Teresa Aguzzi, a naïve-looking but cunning country girl involved in a Pygmalion story set in 1950s Italy. The same year she appeared in Senza buccia (Skin Deep) by Marcello Aliprandi, a story of love relationships at a holiday hideout.

In There Is a Ghost in My Bed (1980), an Italo-Spanish production by Claudio de Molinis, she played newlywed Adelaide Fumagalli who arrives at the "Black Castle" in England with her husband on honeymoon. The castle is home to the ghost of 17th century nobleman Sir Archibald, played by veteran actor Renzo Montagnani (who played Teresa's father in Il corpo della ragassa). Sir Archibald plays his games to seduce Adelaide which will eventually end badly for him.

Il marito in vacanza (1981) by Alessandro Lucidi and Mario Lucidi would again bring Carati and Montagnani together. Montagnani is a professor who tries to seduce Lucia Coradini (Carati), a beautiful colleague.

In 1984, Carati met director Joe d'Amato through her actress friend Jenny Tamburi and played in four D'Amato films, among which are L'alcova (The Alcove, 1984) and Il piacere (The Pleasure, 1985), both set in 1930s Italy and with Laura Gemser.

In 1987–88, she appeared in a number of adult films by Giorgio Grand, along with a team of performers including Rocco Siffredi. In 1989, she was in The Whore by Alex de Renzy and Henri Pachard.

Carati's last role was as an occultist in Violent Shit – The Movie (2015) by Luigi Pastore. The film is a remake of Violent Shit by Andreas Schnaas. The work is dedicated to Carati, who had died of a brain tumor before the film's release.
