= Ray Lovelock =

Ray Lovelock may refer to:

- Ray Lovelock (Macross), a fictional character in the Macross universe
- Ray Lovelock (actor) (1950–2017), Italian actor
