= Gangbuster (film) =

- Directed by: Alberto Marras
- Screenplay by: Claudio Fragasso; Antonio Cucca; Vittorio Vighi; Alberto Marras
- Produced by: Vincenzo Salviani; Giuliano Anellucci
- Starring: Ray Lovelock; Mel Ferrer; Lilli Carati; John Steiner
- Cinematography: Angelo Bevilacqua
- Edited by: Amedeo Giomini
- Music by: Ubaldo Continiello
- Production companies: T.D.L. Film; Angry Film
- Distributed by: Regional
- Release date: 22 September 1977 (Italy)
- Running time: 95 minutes

Gangbuster (Italian: L'avvocato della mala) is a 1977 crime film written and directed by Alberto Marras.

== Cast ==
- Ray Lovelock as Lawyer Mario Gastali
- Mel Ferrer as Peseti, the Boss
- Lilli Carati asPaola
- John Steiner as Killer
- Gabriele Tinti as Tony
- Umberto Orsini as Farnese
- Orazio Orlando as Giorgio
- Rosario Borelli as Police Commissioner
- Romano Puppo as Peseti's henchman
- Gino Pagnani as taxi driver

== Production ==
Gangbuster was filmed at Elios Film in Rome. The film was producer Alberto Marras' only film made as a director.

== Release ==
Gangbuster was distributed theatrically in Italy on 22 September 1977. When the film was released on home video in VHS in Italy it has an 88 minute and 29 second running time, and in Germany it had a 85 minute and 51 second running time, and was a different version of the film with inserts from Meet Him and Die. These included the car chases and prison fights from that film, and it featured a different sound score, such as Franco Micalizzi's theme from Merciless Man.
