= Lola Falana =

American singer, dancer, and actress (born 1942)

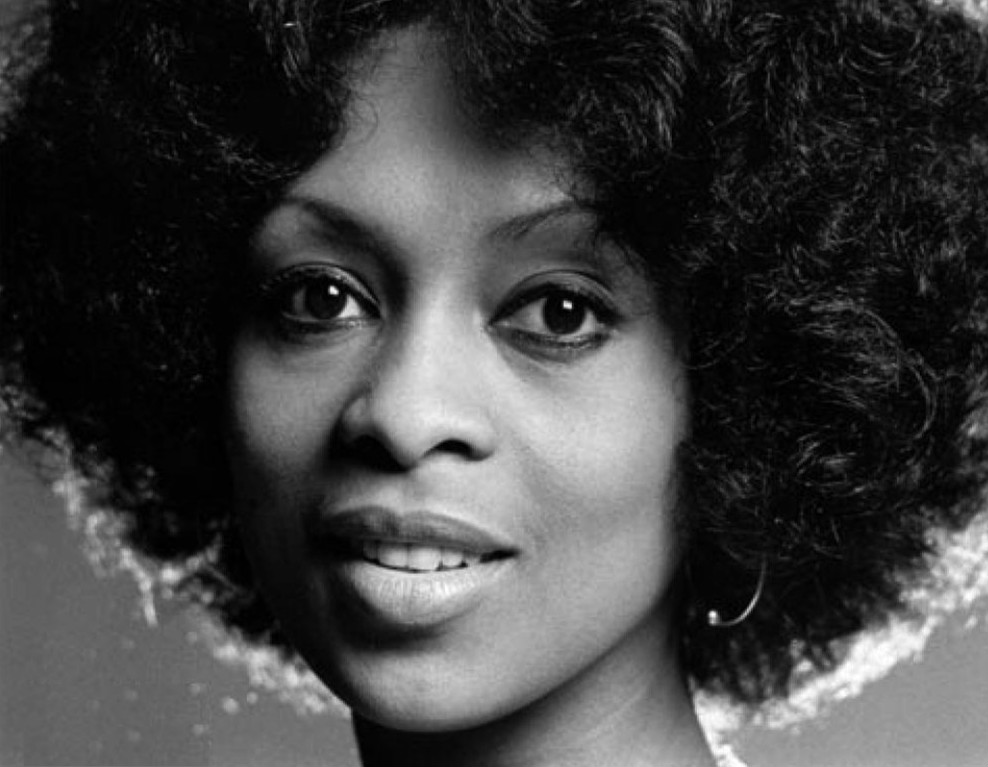
- Falana circa 1972
- Born: Loletha Elayne Falana or Loletha Elaine Falana; September 11, 1942 (age 84); Camden, New Jersey, U.S.
- Occupations: Actress; singer; dancer
- Years active: 1961–1997
- Spouse: Feliciano Tavares Jr. (m. 1970; div. 1975)

Loletha Elayne Falana or Loletha Elaine Falana (born September 11, 1942), better known by her stage name Lola Falana, is an American singer, dancer, and actress. She was nominated for the Tony Award for Best Actress in a Musical in 1975 for her performance as Edna Mae Sheridan in Doctor Jazz.

== Early life ==
Lola Falana was born in Camden, New Jersey. She was the third of six children born to Bennett, a welder, and Cleo Falana, a seamstress (1921–2010). Falana's father, an Afro-Cuban, left his homeland of Cuba to serve in the U.S. Marine Corps, later becoming a welder shortly after meeting Falana's mother, who was African-American. By age 3, Falana was dancing, and by age 5, she was singing in the church choir. In 1952, Falana's family, which by this time included two more siblings, moved to Philadelphia, Pennsylvania. In the period she was in junior high school, Falana was dancing in nightclubs to which she was escorted by her mother. Pursuing a musical career became so important to her that, against her parents' wishes, she dropped out of Germantown High School a few months before graduation and moved to New York City.

== Career ==
In 1958, Falana's first dancing gig was at age 16 during a Dinah Washington nightclub appearance in Philadelphia in which Washington gave her the opening act slot to perform. Washington, dubbed the Queen of Blues, was influential in fostering Falana's early career. While dancing in a chorus line in Atlantic City, New Jersey, Falana was discovered by Sammy Davis Jr., who gave her a featured role in his 1964 Broadway musical Golden Boy. After the musical, Falana launched her music career later in 1964. "My Baby", her first single, was recorded and released for Mercury Records in 1965. Later in her career, she recorded under Frank Sinatra's record label, “Reprise.” In the late 1960s, Falana was mentored by Sammy Davis, Jr.

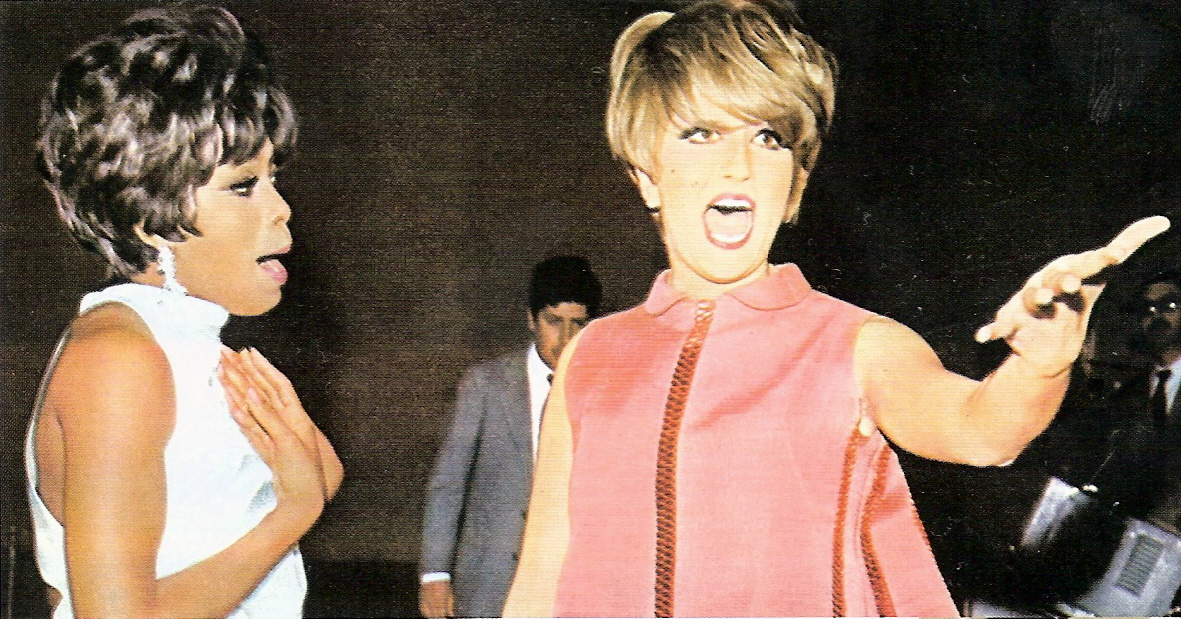
Lola Falana with Mina on Sabato sera, 1967.

In 1966, Davis cast Falana, with himself, Ossie Davis, and Cicely Tyson, in her first film role, as the female character Theo in A Man Called Adam. Falana became a major star of Italian television in 1966 and cinema in 1967. She became fluent in Italian while starring in three movies in Italy, the first of which, Lola Colt, was considered a Spaghetti Western. She sang and danced on the TV show Sabato sera, next to singer Mina. She was known as the "Black Venus". During this time she was busy touring with Davis as a singer and dancer, making films in Italy, and reprising her role in Golden Boy during its revival in London. In 1969, Falana ended her close working relationship with Sammy Davis Jr., but the two remained friends. "If I didn't break away," she told TV Guide, "I would always be known as the little dancer with Sammy Davis Jr... I wanted to be known as something more." In 1970, she made her American film debut in The Liberation of L.B. Jones and was nominated for the Golden Globe Award for New Star of the Year – Actress for her performance. The same year, she posed for Playboy magazine. She was the first black woman to model for the Fabergé "Tigress" perfume ads. In those early years, she starred in a few movies considered to be of the blaxploitation genre. She appeared at the Val Air Ballroom sponsored by Black Pride, Inc., in 1978.

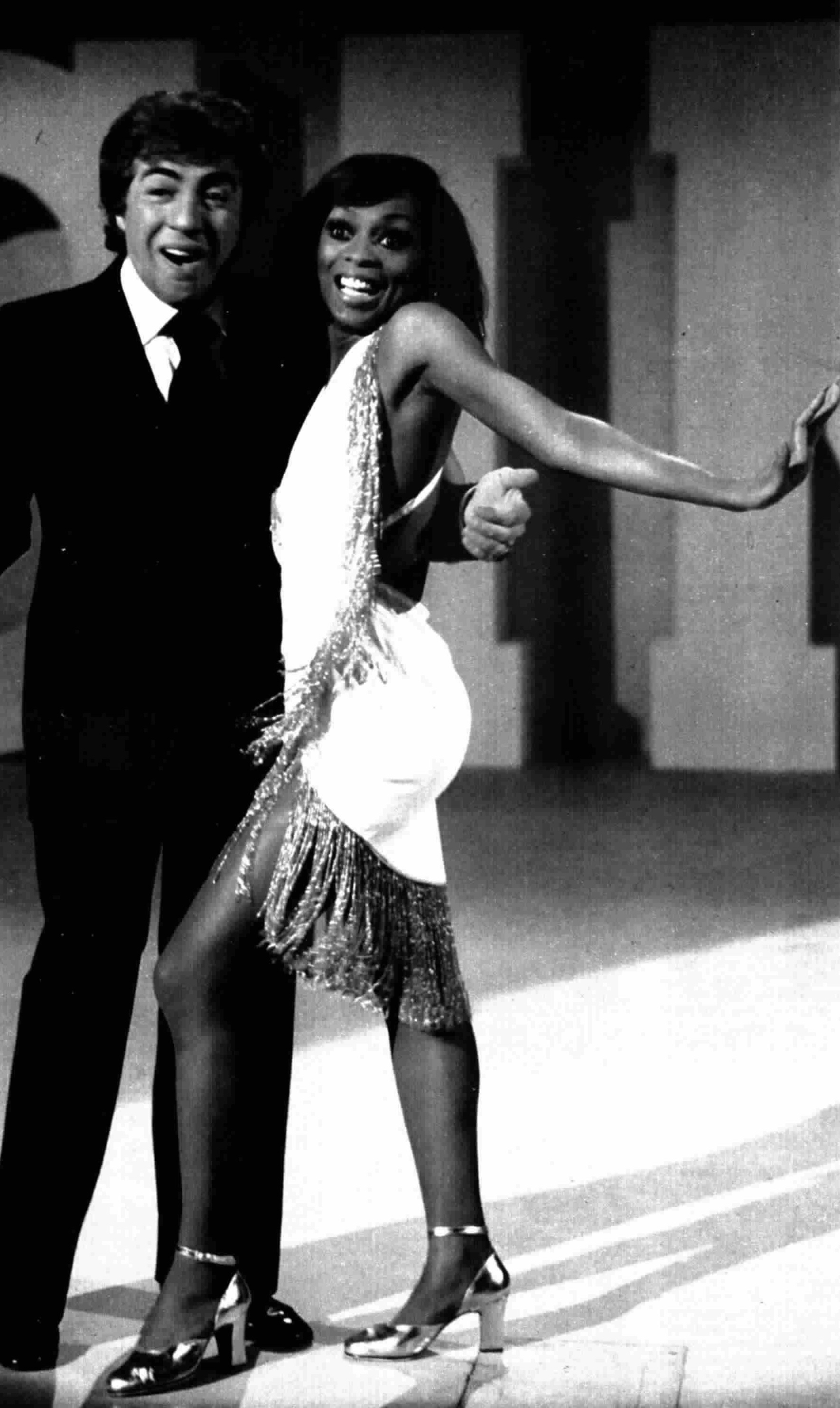
Falana with Gino Bramieri on the Italian TV show Hai visto mai?, 1973.

American TV audiences became familiar with Falana during the early 1970s. She often appeared on The Joey Bishop Show and The Hollywood Palace, displaying her talent for music, dance, and light comedy. These appearances led to more opportunities. She was the first supporting player hired by Bill Cosby for his much-anticipated variety hour The New Bill Cosby Show, which made its debut on September 11, 1972 (her 30th birthday). Cosby had met Falana in his college days when he was a struggling comic and she was a teenager dancing in Philadelphia nightclubs. Throughout the mid-1970s, Falana made guest appearances on many popular TV shows, including The Tonight Show Starring Johnny Carson, The Muppet Show, Laugh-In and The Flip Wilson Show. She also starred in her own television specials. In 1975, Falana's disco record There's A Man Out There Somewhere reached #67 on the Billboard R&B chart. That same year, she returned to Broadway as the lead in the musical Doctor Jazz. Although the production closed after five performances, Falana was nominated for a Tony Award, and she won the 1975 Theater World Award.

With help from Sammy Davis, Jr., she brought her act to Las Vegas, and she became a top draw there. By the late 1970s, Falana was considered the "Queen of Las Vegas". She played to sold-out crowds at The Sands, The Riviera, and the MGM Grand hotels. Finally The Aladdin offered her $100,000 per week to perform. At the time, Falana was the highest paid female performer in Las Vegas. Her show ran 20 weeks during the year, and it became a major tourist attraction. While playing to sold-out crowds in Las Vegas, Falana looked for other TV roles. She was slated to star in a remake of the 1950s Vampira Show. When this project collapsed, she joined the cast of the short-lived CBS soap opera Capitol as Charity Blake, a wealthy entertainment mogul.

=== Later career and life ===
In 1995, Falana recorded the song "Don't Cry, Mary" with Catholic artist Joseph Lee Hooker. No longer performing, she tours the country with a message of hope and spirituality. When not on tour, she lives a quiet life in Las Vegas working on The Lambs of God Ministry, an apostolate she founded. The ministry is focused on helping children who have been orphaned in Sub-Saharan Africa, and works closely with the group Save Sub-Saharan Orphans. Falana's last known musical performance was in 1997 at Wayne Newton's theater in Branson, Missouri.

== Personal life ==
=== Love affair and marriage ===
Sometime between 1965 and 1968, Falana had an affair with her then-mentor Sammy Davis Jr. that became public knowledge after Davis confessed it to his then-wife May Britt, which led to their divorce in 1968.

In 1970, Falana married Feliciano "Butch" Tavares Jr., one of five brothers of the popular R&B and soul vocal band Tavares; they divorced in 1975.

=== Health problems ===
In June 1987, Falana had a severe relapse of multiple sclerosis. Her left side was paralyzed, she became partially blind, and her voice and hearing were impaired. Her recovery lasted a year and a half, and she spent most of her time praying. Falana attributes her recovery to a spiritual experience which she described as "being able to feel the presence of the Lord". Falana converted to Catholicism in 1988. Although she performed again in Las Vegas shows in 1987, Falana's practice of religion and faith became the center of her life. After another bout with multiple sclerosis in 1996, Falana returned to Philadelphia and lived with her parents for a short time.

== Cultural references ==
- Barry Manilow's 1978 hit song "Copacabana" prominently features a character named Lola, whose name was inspired by Falana
- Rapper Foxy Brown rapped "Lola Falana dripped in Gabbana, 90's style, the finest style..." in her song "I'll Be Good", with Jay Z on her debut album Ill Na Na.
- In D.C. Cab, Tyrone (played by Charlie Barnett) asks the character Denise "When you goin' out with me?" Her incredulous response of "Why should I go out with you?" is met by a defiant "Because I'm black and I'm beautiful." Denise deadpans "Well, so is Lola Falana, but you don't see me goin' out with her."
- In A Different World, Whitley Gilbert makes numerous references to Lola Falana throughout the series.
- In Wayans Bros., Marlon and Shawn attempt to pick up an elderly man in their "afrocab" and tell him that they have an old magazine with Lola Falana (you remember her from all those hilarious Bob Hope specials Marlon proclaims) as the centerpiece. They force the man into the cab after he declines and runs off, and Shawn and Marlon realize the magazine is gone. Shawn then says "those white guys sure love them some Lola Falana."
- The SCTV character Lola Heatherton, played by Catherine O'Hara, was derived from the names of Lola Falana and Joey Heatherton. The character spoofed both women, especially in their later career television variety show appearances in the 1970s.
- In a January 19, 1991 sketch on Saturday Night Live entitled "The Sinatra Group," Frank Sinatra (Phil Hartman) tells Luther Campbell (Chris Rock), "You got talent! You got a Dionne Warwick/Falana kind of thing going."
- In Roxanne Shante's song "Have a Nice Day", she declares herself "A pioneer/like Lola Falana".
- In Barbershop 2: Back in Business, barber Eddie (Cedric the Entertainer) admonishes his boss Calvin (Ice Cube) for making him take down his picture of Lola Falana from the wall of his booth.
- In Family Matters, Eddie (Darius McCrary) wants new high-tops that cost $70, but Carl (Reginald VelJohnson) "would not pay $70 for shoes if Lola Falana was in them."
- In Marvel Comics's Tomb of Dracula #58 (published in July 1977), the vampire hunter Blade says "That's why I was watchin' that clock like it was a Penthouse pin-up of Lola Falana!"
- In the Sanford and Son episode "The Escorts" (season 5, episode 19) Fred (Redd Foxx) is hired by Lola Falana and returns from her home exhausted and disheveled with her dog, a huge Saint Bernard, on a chain.
- Rapper Esham recorded a song titled "Lowlafalana" in 1997.
- "Miss Black Person USA," a recurring sketch on In Living Color, takes place at the fictional Lola Falana Recreational Center in Detroit.
- In an early episode of Family Guy, Peter Griffin flashes back to a time when he confused his girlfriend Leslie Uggams with Lola Falana.
- In an August 2019 interview with Vulture, actress Niecy Nash named Falana as her earliest inspiration: "I knew I wanted to be an actor when I was 5 years old and I saw the most gorgeous black woman on television. I said to my grandmother 'Who is that?,' and she said 'Baby, that's Lola Falana.' And I said 'That's what I want to be, Grandma. I want to be black and fabulous and on TV.'"
- In 2022, R&B singer Muni Long referred to Falana with her performance at the BET Awards.
- In 2024, Falana was depicted by Lori Harvey in Fight Night: The Million Dollar Heist.

== Filmography ==
=== Film ===
Year	Title	Role	Notes
1966	A Man Called Adam	Theo	
1967	Lola Colt	Lola Gate	
1967	Stasera mi butto	Lola	
1967	When I Say That I Love You	Julia	original title: "Quando dico che ti amo"
1970	The Liberation of L.B. Jones	Emma Jones	
1974	The Klansman	Loretta Sykkes	
1975	Lady Cocoa	Coco	
1990	Mad About You	Casey's Secretary	
2013	Mary's Land [es]	Herself	documentary

== Television work ==
- Sabato sera (1967) – Italy
- The Flip Wilson Show, season 1, episode 8 (1970)
- Teatro Dieci (1971) – Italy
- The New Bill Cosby Show (1972–1973)
- Hai visto mai? (1973) – Italy
- The Streets of San Francisco, episode "A String of Puppets" (February 7, 1974)
- Ben Vereen... Comin' at Ya (1975) (canceled after 4 episodes)
- Lola (1975)
- The Lola Falana Show, four variety specials on ABC (January – March 1976)
- The Love Boat, season 2, episodes 1 and 2 (1978)
- Liberace: Valentine's Day Special (1979)
- The Muppet Show, season 4, episode 11 (1979)
- Fantasy Island, "Spending Spree", season 2, episode 19 (1979)
- Lola, Lola y Lollo (1982)
- Made in Italy (1982) – Italy
- Capitol (1984–1986)
