= Silvia Dionisio =

Italian actress (born 1951)

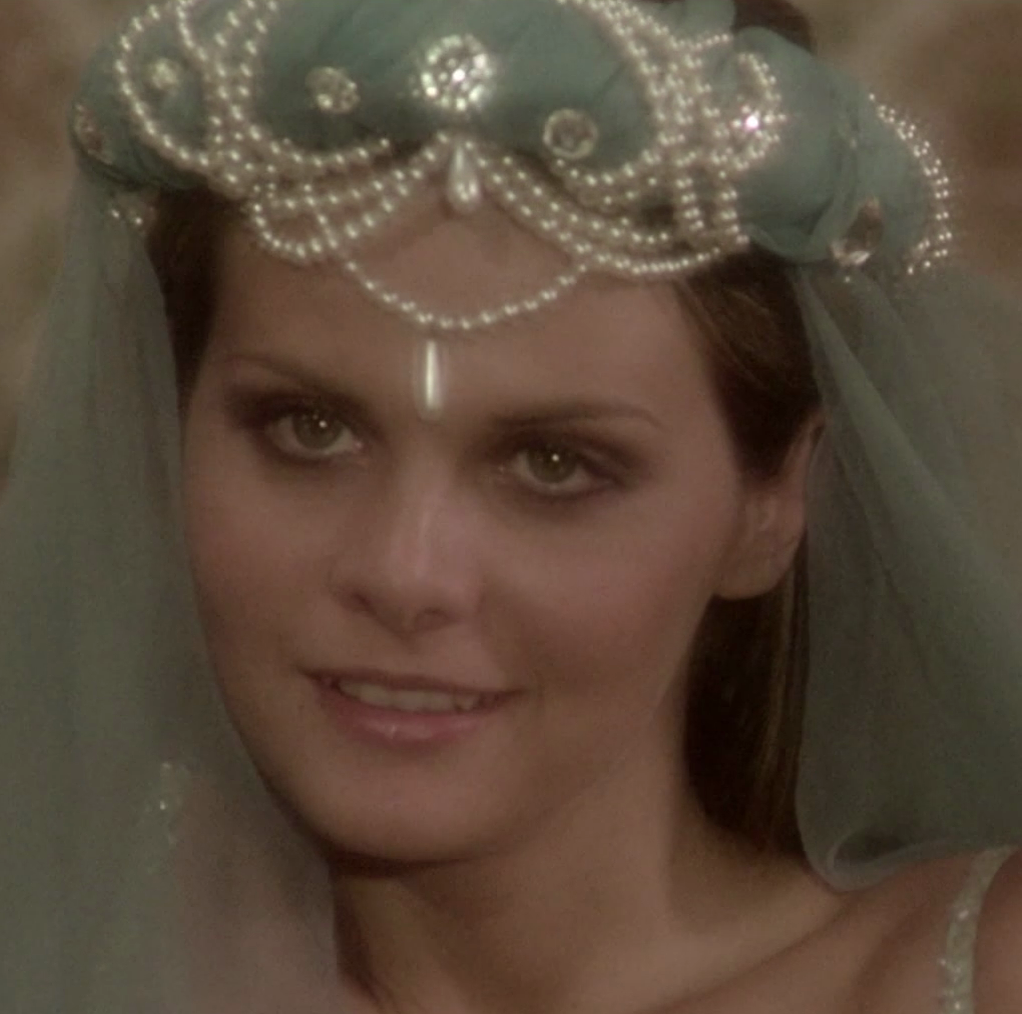
- Dionisio in Strip First, Then We Talk (1975)
- Born: 28 September 1951 (age 74); Rome, Italy
- Occupation: Actress

Silvia Dionisio (born 28 September 1951) is an Italian actress who appeared in several movies in the 1970s.

== Life and career ==
Born in Rome, Dionisio made her acting debut when she was only 14 years old in John Schlesinger's Darling. The first director who gave her significant roles was Ruggero Deodato, who later became her husband. She got her first leading role in 1969, in Eat It. Mainly cast in roles of unscrupulous and luscious women, she mostly starred in comedies and crime films.

In the early 1980s, she left the film industry; her last appearance was in a liqueur commercial directed by Federico Fellini.

== Selected filmography ==
- Rita the Mosquito (1966)
- Pronto... c'è una certa Giuliana per te (1967)
- The Young, the Evil and the Savage (1968)
- Police Chief Pepe (1969)
- Pensiero d'amore (1969)
- Giacomo Casanova: Childhood and Adolescence (1969)
- A Girl Called Jules (1970)
- The Swinging Confessors (1970)
- Long Live Robin Hood (1971)
- Blood for Dracula (1974)
- Erotomania (1974)
- My Friends (1975)
- Waves of Lust (1975)
- Strip First, Then We Talk (1975)
- Live Like a Cop, Die Like a Man (1976)
- A Common Sense of Modesty (1976)
- Bloody Payroll (1976)
- Fear in the City (1976)
- Il... Belpaese (1977)
- Il marito in collegio (1977)
- Lobster for Breakfast (1979)
- Terror Express (1979)
- Crimebusters (1976)
- Ciao marziano (1980)
- Murder Obsession (1981)
