= Strip First, Then We Talk =

1975 film

- Directed by: Fabio Pittorru
- Screenplay by: Fabio Pittorru
- Produced by: Sergio Simonetti
- Starring: Enzo Cerusico; Silvia Dionisio; Nino Castelnuovo
- Cinematography: Pier Luigi Santi
- Edited by: Romeo Ciatti
- Music by: Mario Pagano
- Release date: 1975
- Country: Italy
- Language: Italian

Strip First, Then We Talk (Italian: Amore mio spogliati... che poi ti spiego!, lit. 'My love, undress... I'll explain later!') is a 1975 commedia sexy all'italiana film written and directed by Fabio Pittorru, in his directorial debut. It stars Enzo Cerusico and Silvia Dionisio.

== Cast ==
- Enzo Cerusico as Alberto Donati
- Silvia Dionisio as Cristina
- Nino Castelnuovo as Giuliano
- Lia Tanzi as Rossana
- Valeria Fabrizi as Benita
- Manuela Wondratschek as Elga
- Umberto D'Orsi as Police Commissioner
- Gino Pagnani as Otello
- Toni Ucci as Gerbino
- Dante Cleri as Martuccio
- Ilona Staller as Otello's friend
- Luca Sportelli as Carabiniere

== Production ==
The film was produced by Jarama Film. Censorship records list Renzo Ragazzi as co-director, although his name does not appear in the film's credits. It was shot in Anguillara Sabazia.

== Release ==
The film was distributed in Italian cinemas by D.E.A. starting from 4 December 1972. The version released in the United Kingdom was heavily cut, with a runtime 25 minutes shorter than the original version.

== Reception ==
A contemporary review from La Stampa panned the film, referring to it as 'a story without head or tail that tries to find spice in a handful of stripteases', in which 'the actors seem unconvinced, as does the audience'. Renato Palazzi from Corriere della Sera was also critical, describing it as 'perhaps one of the most boring and depressing products of recent years'.
