= Paolo Carlini =

Italian actor (1922–1979)

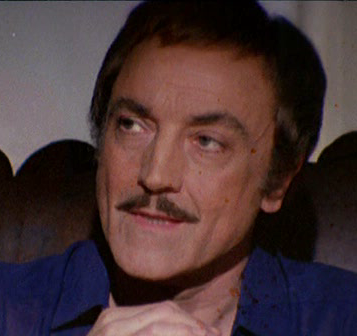
- Carlini in Blue Jeans, 1975
- Born: 6 January 1922; Sant'Arcangelo di Romagna, Italy
- Died: 3 November 1979 (aged 57); Rome, Italy
- Occupation: Actor
- Years active: 1940–1979

Paolo Carlini (6 January 1922 – 3 November 1979) was an Italian stage, television and film actor. He appeared in 45 films between 1940 and 1979. He is perhaps best-known to international audiences for his supporting role as the hairdresser Mario in Roman Holiday (1953) alongside Audrey Hepburn and Gregory Peck.

Born in Sant'Arcangelo di Romagna, Carlini followed the acting courses held by actress Teresa Franchini and debuted at very young age on stage. He is regarded as one of the early stars of Italian television mini-series (the so-called "sceneggiati"). He is also well known for his association with actress Lea Padovani, with whom he starred in a number of critically acclaimed stage dramas in the 1950s. Aside from his long film career, Carlini attained notoriety as the rumoured partner of Cardinal Giovanni Battista Montini, Archbishop of Milan, later Pope Paul VI.

== Partial filmography ==
- Goodbye Youth (1940) - Pino
- Ridi pagliaccio (1941) - Uno spettatore nel circo
- La grande strada (1947) - Adam
- L'apocalisse (1947)
- Baron Carlo Mazza (1948) - Fugi
- Napoli eterna canzone (1949) - Roberto Mari
- I due derelitti (1951)
- Papà ti ricordo (1952) - Andrea
- La storia del fornaretto di Venezia (1952)
- The Mute of Portici (1952) - 'Masaniello'
- Roman Holiday (1953) - Mario Delani
- Cardinal Lambertini (1954) - Lawyer Carlo Barozzi
- Mai ti scorderò (1956) - Riccardo Selvi
- La voce che uccide (1956) - Giornalista
- La Gioconda (1958) - Enzo Grimaldo, principe di Santa Flora
- It Started in Naples (1960) - Renzo
- Luciano, una vita bruciata (1962) - Paolo
- Divorzio alla siciliana (1963) - Alfio
- The Betrothed (1964) - Egidio
- Love Italian Style (1965) - Il principe Braccioforte
- Gli altri, gli altri... e noi (1967)
- The Chronicle of Anna Magdalena Bach (1968) - Hölzel
- Psychopath (1968) - Inspektor Harold Bennett
- Quarta parete (1968) - Don Luigi
- Either All or None (1968) - Buseba
- Don Chisciotte and Sancio Panza (1968) - Don José
- I 2 deputati (1968) - Paolo Silvestri
- Puro siccome un Angelo papà mi fece monaco... di Monza (1969)
- Un caso di coscienza (1970) - Don Gualtiero
- Le inibizioni del dottor Gaudenzi, vedovo, col complesso della buonanima (1971) - Prof. Viscardi
- Don Camillo e i giovani d'oggi (1972) - Don Chichí
- Fratello ladro (1942)
- My Darling Slave (1973) - Manlio
- Monika (1974) - Avv. Massimo Moroni
- Il domestico (1974) - Andrea Donati
- Blue Jeans (1975) - Dr. Carlo Anselmi
- Like Rabid Dogs (1976) - Enrico Ardenghi
- Diary of a Passion (1976) - Pierino
- Lo scoiattolo (1979)
