= Isabella Biagini =

Italian actress and showgirl (1940–2018)

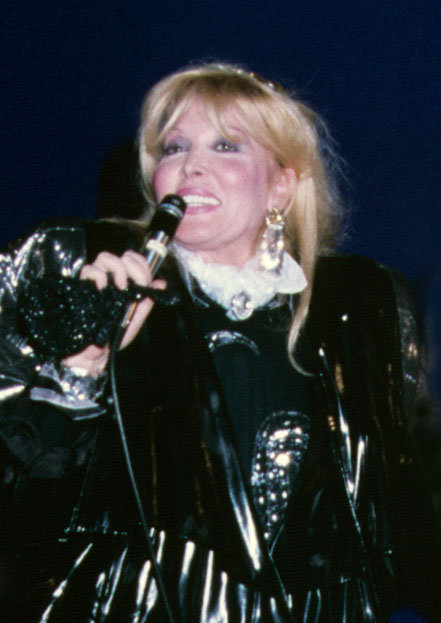
- Born: Concetta Biagini; 8 December 1940; Rome, Kingdom of Italy
- Died: 14 April 2018 (aged 77); Rome, Italy
- Occupation: Actress

Isabella Biagini, born Concetta Biagini, (8 December 1940 – 14 April 2018) was an Italian actress and showgirl.

== Life and career ==
Biagini was born in Rome on 8 December 1940. She debuted in childhood as a radio actress and advertising model. At 14 she entered the Miss Italia competition, and made her film debut in a minor role in Michelangelo Antonioni's Le Amiche (1955). Later from the 1960s, Biagini worked assiduously on the radio and television and posed on many fotonovelas. On the small screen, she achieved some success not only as a showgirl but also as a talented impersonator; on the big screen, despite the numerous appearances, her roles were usually stereotyped. In later years, Biagini has been a protagonist of news columns in relation to the critical conditions of poverty in which she lived.

== Partial filmography ==
- Il cocco di mamma (1957) – Rosa
- La zia d'America va a sciare (1957) – La vedette
- Serenatella sciuè sciuè (1958) – Ilde
- I due mafiosi (1964) – Jacqueline
- Slalom (1965) – Simonetta Riccardo
- Love Italian Style (1966) – Assunta
- Supermen Against the Orient (1967)
- Pensando a te (1969)
- Gli infermieri della mutua (1969) – Valeria
- Quelli belli... siamo noi (1970) – Fiore Castrosalvo – Gino's niece
- La ragazza del prete (1970) – Maria Innocenza Furlan
- Mazzabubù... quante corna stanno quaggiù? (1971) – Franco's wife
- Io non vedo, tu non parli, lui non sente (1971) – Cecilia
- Il clan dei due Borsalini (1971) – Il fantasma
- Boccaccio (1972) – Ambrugia
- Il sindacalista (1972) – Teresa Piredda – Saverio's wife
- Il terrore con gli occhi storti (1972) – Mirella Trombetti
- Maria Rosa la guardona (1973) – Maria Rosa Ceccantoni
- Supermen Against the Orient (1973) – Moglie del console
- Erotomania (1974) – Dott.ssa Bonetti
- Paolo il freddo (1974) – Rich woman
- Loaded Guns (1975) – Rosy
- La ragazza dalla pelle di corallo (1976) – Antonella
- Nick the Sting (1976) – Edy
- Atti impuri all'italiana (1976) – Wife of Chemist
- Stangata in famiglia (1976)
- Ladies' Doctor (1977) – Giovanna
- Tutti a squola (1979) – Prostituta
- Ciao marziano (1980) – Isabella
- La cameriera seduce i villeggianti (1980) – Pucci Ferretti
- "FF.SS." – Cioè: "...che mi hai portato a fare sopra a Posillipo se non mi vuoi più bene?" (1983) – Madonna Sofia
- The Future Is Woman (1984) –(uncredited)
- Grandi magazzini (1986) – Tester
- Capriccio (1987) – Stella Polaris
- La bruttina stagionata (1996) – madre di Olimpia
- Il segreto del giaguaro (2000) – Contessa Kampari Madness (final film role)
