= Lola Colt =

1967 film

- Directed by: Siro Marcellini
- Starring: Lola Falana
- Cinematography: Giuseppe La Torre
- Music by: Ubaldo Continiello
- Release date: 1967
- Country: Italy

Lola Colt (also known as Black Tigress and Lola Baby) is a 1967 Spaghetti Western film directed by Siro Marcellini.

== Reception ==
One writer described as "a very average Western filled with all the predictable clichés of the genre".

== Cast ==
- Lola Falana: Lola Gate
- Peter Martell: Rod
- Germán Cobos: Larry / El Diablo
- Tom Felleghy: Don Rodriguez
- Evar Maran: Don Pedro
- Erna Schürer: Rose Rodriguez
- Dada Gallotti: Virginia
