= Live Like a Cop, Die Like a Man =

1976 film

- Italian film poster for Live Like a Cop, Die Like a Man
- Directed by: Ruggero Deodato
- Screenplay by: Fernando Di Leo
- Story by: Fernando Di Leo; Alberto Marras; Vincenzo Salviani
- Produced by: Alberto Marras; Vincenzo Salviani
- Starring: Marc Porel; Ray Lovelock
- Cinematography: Guglielmo Mancori
- Edited by: Gianfranco Simoncelli
- Music by: Ubaldo Continiello
- Release date: 11 March 1976 (Italy)
- Running time: 100 minutes
- Country: Italy
- Box office: ₤741 million

Live Like a Cop, Die Like a Man (Italian: Uomini si nasce poliziotti si muore, 'If a man is born a policeman, he dies a policeman') is a 1976 Italian poliziotteschi crime film, directed by Ruggero Deodato and starring Marc Porel and Ray Lovelock.

== Plot ==
Fred and Tony are members of an elite 'special squad' of police in Rome who are licensed-to-kill, undercover cops who thrive on living dangerously.

== Cast ==
- Marc Porel as Fred
- Ray Lovelock as Tony
- Adolfo Celi as The Boss
- Franco Citti as Rudy Ruginski
- Silvia Dionisio as Norma
- Marino Masé as Rick Conti
- Renato Salvatori as Roberto Pasquini, a.k.a. Bibi
- Sergio Ammirata as Sergeant
- Bruno Corazzari as Morandi
- Daniele Dublino as Corrupt police inspector
- Sofia Dionisio as Lina Pasquini (credited as "Flavia Fabiani")
- Tom Felleghy as Major
- Margherita Horowitz as Mona, a hostage woman
- Gina Mascetti as Maricca
- Marcello Monti as 3rd kidnapper
- Claudio Nicastro as Commissioner
- Gino Pagnani as Paul, the dog trainer
- Enzo Pulcrano as Mario, Pasquini's henchman
- Alvaro Vitali as Concierge at Pasquini's building

== Production ==
Live Like a Cop, Die Like a Man was based on a screenplay by Fernando Di Leo, originally titled Poliziotti si nasce poliziotti si muore (Born a Cop, Die a Cop). The film was director Ruggero Deodato's only film in the poliziotteschi genre.

== Release ==
Live Like a Cop, Die Like a Man was released on 11 March 1976. It has grossed 741,142,540 lira domestically. The film was censored on its initial release in Italy. The cut scene involved a scene with Renato Salvatori's character Bibi who has his men gouge out the eyes of a thug played by Bruno Corazzari, and then crush the eyeball under his feet.

== See also ==
- List of Italian films of 1976
