= C'è un fantasma nel mio letto =

1981 film by Claudio Giorgi

- Italian theatrical release poster
- Directed by: Claudio Giorgi
- Screenplay by: Luis Maria Delgado; Jesus Rodriguez Folgar
- Story by: Claudio Simonelli
- Starring: Lilli Carati; Vincenzo Crocitti; Renzo Montagnani
- Cinematography: Raul Perez Cubero
- Edited by: Giorgio Serrallonga
- Music by: Piero Umiliani
- Production companies: Telecinema 80; Victory Film
- Distributed by: Cinedaf
- Release dates: 3 April 1981 (Italy); 28 November 1981 (Spain)
- Running time: 94 minutes
- Countries: Italy; Spain

C'è un fantasma nel mio letto (transl. There is a ghost in my bed Spanish: Hay un fantasma en mi cama) is a 1981 commedia sexy all'italiana directed by Claudio Giorgi. It is the last film directed by Giorgi.

== Plot ==
A young newlywed couple on the first night of honeymoon, unable to find a hotel, go to an old castle where the presence of a ghost will make their holiday a nightmare.

== Cast ==
- Lilli Carati as Adelaide Fumagalli
- Vincenzo Crocitti as Camillo Fumagalli
- Renzo Montagnani as Archibald Trenton
- Vanessa Hidalgo as Meg
- Guerrino Crivello as Angus
- Luciana Turina as Josephina

== Production ==
During production of the film, the director mentioned that the film was inspired by René Clair's The Ghost Goes West. Film historian and critic Roberto Curti commented that there was very little of Clair's film related to C'è un fantasma nel mio letto.

== Release ==
C'è un fantasma nel mio letto was distributed theatrically in Italy by Cinedaf on 3 April 1981. It was later distributed in Spain as Hay un fantasma en mi cama on 28 November 1981. Curti described the film as being "passed almost unnoticed" by audiences in Italy. In Spain it was a greater success where it has been seen by 278,981 spectators and grossed an equivalent to 266,886 Euro.
