= Il giustiziere di mezzogiorno =

1975 film by Mario Amendola

- Directed by: Mario Amendola
- Written by: Mario Amendola; Bruno Corbucci
- Starring: Franco Franchi
- Cinematography: Fausto Zuccoli
- Music by: Ubaldo Continiello
- Distributed by: Variety Distribution
- Release date: 1975
- Country: Italy
- Language: Italian

Il giustiziere di mezzogiorno (Italian for The Noonday Executioner) is a 1975 Italian comedy film written and directed by Mario Amendola. It is a parody of Death Wish.

== Plot ==
Abandoned by his wife and daughter, after suffering some injustices, the surveyor Franco Gabbiani decides to take revenge against dishonest policemen, politicians and bullies.

== Cast ==
- Franco Franchi as Franco Gabbiani
- Ombretta De Carlo as Agata
- Aldo Puglisi as Fernando
- Gigi Ballista as Director Filiberto Rossetti
- Raf Luca as Balloria
- Maria Antonietta Beluzzi as Mrs. Barzuacchi
- Franco Diogene as Nardini
- Vincenzo Crocitti as Trippa
- Mario Pisu as Inspector
- Tom Felleghy as Rakosky
- Alberto Farnese as Mr. Lorenzi
- Enzo Andronico as Padre di famiglia

== See also ==
- List of Italian films of 1975
