= Candido Erotico =

1978 film directed by Claudio Giorgi

- Directed by: Claudio Giorgi
- Written by: Luigi Montefiori (aka George Eastman)
- Starring: Lilli Carati
- Cinematography: Emilio Loffredo
- Music by: Nico Fidenco
- Release date: 1978
- Country: Italy
- Language: Italian

Candido Erotico (also known as Copenhagen Nights, The Exhibitionist, A Man for Sale and Look at Me) is a 1978 Italian erotic romance-drama film written and directed by Claudio Giorgi (here credited as Claudio De Molinis). Luigi Montefiori (aka George Eastman) co-wrote the screenplay.

== Cast ==
- Lilli Carati: Charlotte
- Mircha Carven: Carlo
- María Baxa: Veronique
- Marco Guglielmi: Paul
- Fernando Cerulli: Voyeur on Train
- Ajita Wilson: Sex Show Performer
