= Monika (1974 film) =

1974 film by Mario Imperoli

- Directed by: Mario Imperoli
- Starring: Gloria Guida
- Music by: Nico Fidenco
- Release date: 28 February 1974
- Country: Italy
- Language: Italian

Monika (Italian: La ragazzina) is a 1974 Italian comedy film directed by Mario Imperoli. It marked the film debut of the Italian sexy comedy icon Gloria Guida, who later worked again with Imperoli in Blue Jeans.

== Plot ==
Monika is a pretty fifteen-year-old from a wealthy family and left much to herself. She has a relationship with Leo, a student older than she, who often accompanies her in the car. Over time, however, Monika gets closer and closer to one of her professors, Bruno de Angelis, a non-conformist teacher of art history.

Following an inappropriate episode at her sixteen-year birthday party, Monika decides that Leo isn't the right guy for her and starts falling in love with the professor. The latter and Monika, one day, have an interesting conversation about love and its meaning. The conversation ends with a kiss and the professor and Monika make love, but he is at the same time the lover of the wife of the lawyer Moroni, who in turn is in love with Monika.

When Monika discovers the professor's secrets, Moroni tries to console her, but exaggerates and forces Monika to flee. During the chase the lawyer accidentally loses his life.

== Cast ==
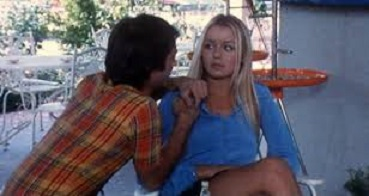
Guida as Monika in the film

- Gloria Guida: Monika
- Colette Descombes: Sandra Moroni
- Paolo Carlini: Avv. Massimo Moroni
- Gian Luigi Chirizzi: Leo
- Andrés Resino: Prof. Bruno De Angelis
