= Snapshot of a Crime =

- Directed by: Mario Imperoli
- Written by: Mario Imperoli; Mario Brenta; Vito Bruschini
- Cinematography: Luciano Tovoli
- Music by: Franco Bixio
- Distributed by: Variety Distribution
- Release date: 1975
- Running time: 90 minutes
- Language: Italian

Snapshot of a Crime (Italian: Istantanea per un delitto) is a 1975 Italian giallo film written and directed by Mario Imperoli (here credited as Arthur Saxon).

== Plot ==
Two women, apparently linked by a deep friendship, are involved in an obscure series of blackmails by a stranger.

== Cast ==
- Erna Schürer as Mirna
- Monica Strebel as Claudia
- Luis La Torre as Luca
- Lorenza Guerrieri as Stefania
