= Take All of Me =

- Directed by: Luigi Cozzi
- Screenplay by: Luigi Cozzi; Michele Delle Aie; Danielle Del Giudice; Sonia Molteni
- Story by: Sonia Molteni
- Produced by: Mario Cotone
- Starring: Richard Johnson; Pamaela Villoresi; Maria Antonietta Beluzzi
- Cinematography: Roberto D'Ettore Piazzoli
- Edited by: Angelo Curti
- Music by: Stelvio Cipriani
- Production company: A-Esse Cinematografica
- Release date: 15 August 1976
- Running time: 91 minutes
- Country: Italy

Take All of Me (Italian: Dedicato a una stella / Dedicated to Stella) is an Italian-Japanese melodrama film written and directed by Luigi Cozzi.

== Plot ==
A young woman named Stella is dying in a hospital of leukemia. A man named Richard Lasky who arrives at the hospital is mistaken for her relative and he is told of Stella's prognosis. The accidental occurrence results in the two forming a romantic relationship in the short period of time Stella has left to live.

== Cast ==
- Richard Johnson as Richard Lasky
- Pamela Villoresi as Stella
- Maria Antonietta Beluzzi as Simone
- Francesco D'Adda as The Doctor
- Riccardo Cucciolla as Stella's father
- Mauro Curi as Stella's brother

== Reception ==
David McGillvray reviewed the film in the Monthly Film Bulletin and stated that the film "pulled out all the stops to contrive a three-handkercheif weepie unsurpassed since the days of Love Story." McGillvray praised the film as "flawlessly photographed by Roberto D'Ettore Piazolli" but found that the film "all too often one's tears are stemmed by the usual doubts. Why, for instance, is Richard so callous to a girl he knows is dying of leukaemia? And why, in particular, does Stella have so much faith in a composer whose ability is clearly limited to writing bland scores of the type that accompanies this film?"
