= Last Feelings =

- Directed by: Ruggero Deodato
- Screenplay by: Tito Carpi; Roberto Gandus
- Story by: Ruggero Deodato
- Produced by: Giovanni Masini
- Starring: Carlo Lupo; Vittoria Galeazzi; Fiorenzo Fiorentini; Jacques Sernas; Angela Goodwin; Luigi Diberti
- Cinematography: Claudio Cirillo
- Music by: Ubaldo Continiello
- Release date: 1978
- Running time: 98 minutes
- Country: Italy
- Language: Italian

Last Feelings (Italian: L'ultimo sapore dell'aria) is a 1978 melodrama film written and directed by Ruggero Deodato.

== Plot ==
Diego Micheli is a troubled teenage runaway who tries to turn his life around by joining a swimming team and competing in national tryouts and champion races. After coming to the attention of Marco, a swimming instructor, and falling in love with Marco's sister Claudia, he is diagnosed with a terminal brain tumor and is determined to take part in the European Swimming Championships in Holland before it can kill him.

== Cast ==
- Carlo Lupo as Diego Micheli
- Vittoria Galeazzi as Claudia
- Fiorenzo Fiorentini as Anselmo
- Jacques Sernas as The Sports Director
- Angela Goodwin as Maria Micheli, Diego's Mother
- Luigi Diberti as Marco, swimming instructor
- Emilio Delle Piane as The Sports Doctor
- Gino Pagnani as Giovanni
- Deddi Savagnone as The School Teacher
- Gianni Solaro as The Hospital Doctor
- Roberto Pangaro as himself
