= The Last House on the Beach =

- Directed by: Franco Prosperi
- Screenplay by: Romano Migliorini; Gianbattista Mussetto
- Story by: Ettore Sanzò
- Produced by: Pino Buricchi
- Starring: Florinda Bolkan; Ray Lovelock; Flavio Andreini
- Cinematography: Cristiano Pogány
- Edited by: Francesco Malvestito
- Music by: Roberto Pregadio
- Production company: Magirus Film
- Distributed by: Magirus
- Release date: 20 April 1978 (Italy)
- Running time: 85 minutes
- Country: Italy
- Box office: ₤25.4 million

The Last House on the Beach (Italian: La settima donna, also known as Terror and The Seventh Woman) is a 1978 Italian rape and revenge-thriller film directed by Franco Prosperi.

The American title refers to Wes Craven's The Last House on the Left, and Alexandra Heller-Nicholas stated how "combining the nunsploitation subgenre with rape-revenge, the film deviates plot-wise from The Last House on the Left substantially, but arrives at a similar ethical conclusion".

It was argued that the final scene of the movie inspired the final scene in Quentin Tarantino's Death Proof.

== Cast ==
- Florinda Bolkan: Sister Cristina
- Ray Lovelock: Aldo
- Flavio Andreini: Walter
- Stefano Cedrati: Nino
- Sherry Buchanan: Lisa

== Production ==
The Last House on the Beach was Franco Prosperi's second film as a director he made for producer Pino Burichhi.

== Release ==
The Last House on the Beach was distributed in Italy by Magirus and released on April 20, 1978. Roberto Curti, author of Italian Crime Filmography 1968-1980 described the film as "performing very poorly in the Italian box office". It grossed a total of 25.4 million Italian lira on its theatrical release.

== Reception ==
Roberto Curti stated that the film was one of the sleaziest sexploitation films. Curti noted that the plot progression was minimal, and what was left was "a succession of grim, misogynist and exploitative scenes: adolescent nudes, slow motion sodomizations, vicious wounds, assorted killings."

== Notes ==
=== Bibliography ===
- Curti, Roberto (2013). Italian Crime Filmography, 1968-1980. McFarland. ISBN 978-0786469765.
