= Maria Antonietta Beluzzi =

Italian actress (1930–1997)

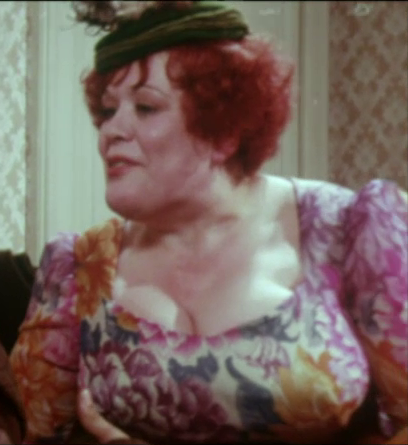
- Beluzzi in Il giustiziere di mezzogiorno (1975)
- Born: 26 July 1930; Bologna, Kingdom of Italy
- Died: 6 August 1997 (aged 67); Corticella, Italy
- Other name: Maria Antonietta

Maria Antonietta Beluzzi (26 July 1930 – 6 August 1997) was an Italian actress who appeared in a number of films in her native country. She is probably best known as the large and huge-breasted tobacconist in Federico Fellini's Amarcord, whose sexual arousal by the male teenager protagonist ends with ironic results. This casting occurred ten years after Fellini first cast her in an uncredited role (as a screen test candidate for La Saraghina) in 8½.

In a minor plot point, her performance in Amarcord is discussed fondly by the characters in John Irving's Until I Find You (2005).

== Filmography ==
Year	Title	Role	Notes
1963	La vita provvisoria		
1963	8½	Bit Part	Uncredited
1973	Amarcord	Tobacconist	
1974	Erotomania	Gertrude	
1974	Ante Up	Mamma Rosa	
1975	Di che segno sei?	Maria Vincenzoni 'King Kong'	
1975	Il giustiziere di mezzogiorno	Signorina Barzuacchi	
1976	Take All of Me	Simone, l'affitacamere	
1976	Per amore di Cesarina	Wife of Luigi	
1978	L'inquilina del piano di sopra	Evelina De Vitis	(final film role)
