= Like Rabid Dogs =

- Directed by: Mario Imperoli
- Written by: Mario Imperoli; Piero Regnoli
- Cinematography: Romano Albani
- Edited by: Otello Colangeli; Sandro Lena
- Music by: Mario Molino
- Release date: 2 August 1976 (Italy)
- Language: Italian

Like Rabid Dogs (Italian: Come cani arrabbiati) is a 1976 Italian crime-thriller film written and directed by Mario Imperoli. It is loosely inspired by the Circeo massacre, in which three young men abducted, and then raped and tortured, two young women over a two-day period.

== Plot ==
Tony is the young member of an upper class Roman family; he lives a hectic double life, and under the guise of good student, he likes to persecute and kill prostitutes in the company of a couple of friends.

== Cast ==
- Jean-Pierre Sabagh as Inspector Muzzi
- Cesare Barro as Tony
- Paola Senatore as Germana
- Annarita Grapputo as Silvia
- Paolo Carlini as Arrigo Ardenghi
- Luis La Torre as Rico
- Gloria Piedimonte as Kidnapped girl
