= Diary of a Passion =

- Directed by: Deco Silla
- Written by: Tullio Nemi Cheli; Luisa Montagnana; Decio Silla; Gilberto Squizzato
- Produced by: Francesco Corti
- Starring: Enrico Maria Salerno; Senta Berger; Paolo Carlini
- Cinematography: Lamberto Caimi
- Edited by: Enzo Monachesi
- Music by: Giuseppe Cremante
- Production company: Dunamis Cinematografica
- Release date: 28 August 1976
- Running time: 100 minutes
- Country: Italy
- Language: Italian

Diary of a Passion (Italian: Brogliaccio d'amore) is a 1976 Italian drama film directed by Deco Silla and starring Enrico Maria Salerno, Senta Berger and Paolo Carlini.

== Cast ==
- Enrico Maria Salerno as Giacomo
- Senta Berger as Roberta
- Paolo Carlini as Pierino
- Marisa Valenti as Patrizia
- Annibale Papetti as Industriale
- Antiniska Nemour as spogliarellista
- Lorenzo Fineschi
- Anna Maria Sprega
- Tino Polenghi
- Rosanna Callegari
- Aurelio Drago
- Anny Ricciarelli
- Silvana Quagliotti
- Maria Fausta Tornaghi
- Silvia Mango
- Loredana Lovatti
- Barbara Postir
- Roberto Vasconi
- Umberto Racepre

== Bibliography ==
- Goble, Alan. The Complete Index to Literary Sources in Film. Walter de Gruyter, 1999.
