= Ku-Fu? Dalla Sicilia con furore =

- Directed by: Nando Cicero
- Written by: Marino Onorati
- Starring: Franco Franchi
- Cinematography: Mario Capriotti
- Music by: Ubaldo Continiello
- Release date: 1973
- Country: Italy
- Language: Italian

Ku-Fu? Dalla Sicilia con furore is a 1973 Italian comedy film directed by Nando Cicero. A parody of kung fu films like Fist of Fury, The Big Boss and One Armed Boxer, it was initially announced under the title La capa più tosta di tutta la Cina! (i.e. The toughest head of all China!). The film was a commercial success, grossing about 900 million lire.

== Plot ==
The Sicilian Franco is a sort of imitation of Bruce Lee that Don Vito, a Chinese expelled from his country because he smuggled rice from Palermo to Beijing, tries to train in the art of kung-fu with disastrous results. Don Vito then receives the news that the municipality of Rome has announced a competition for the post of traffic policeman which requires victory in a martial arts fight. At the suggestion of his teacher, Franco leaves for Rome, where he will be trained in the gym of his friend, the teacher Kon-Chi-Lai. Once in the city, Franco is hosted in the inn run by Kekkor Nuto, an innkeeper with a forbidden header, and here ours will fall in love with Kekkor's daughter, Unci Vuncia, but will also meet the henchmen of the school of Lho-Kon-Tè, an enemy of Kon-Chi-Lai, who wants to win the contest to his champion Attila. To defeat the opponent, Lho-Kon-Tè sends three killers from Milan, Ki Kaka Mai, Tutti Li Tui and Va A Fan, who defeat all Kon-Chi-Lai's men while Franco is chased by the master because of fear. did not want to face the three.

The humiliation then pushes Franco at first to want to take revenge on the trio, but with poor results, and then he makes him return to Kon-Chi-Lai to teach him some special technique, and the master will teach him the Travertine Hand. After a tragi-comic training, Franco seems to have finally learned the technique because he manages to blow up a house with one shot (in reality it was the work of some workers who had to demolish it), and when the news reaches Lho-Kon-Té these first he tries to bribe Franco, without succeeding, and then he sends the manager of a sporting goods shop, Cavalier Strozzi, to whom Franco has a huge debt.

Franco can't pay yet, so Strozzi just bites the hand that Franco uses for his special technique, rendering it unusable. When the day of the tournament arrives, Attila wins all the students of Kon-Chi-Lai but thanks to the advice of Unci Franco manages to defeat the enemy by dint of headbuttons, winning the race. Lho-Kon-Tea, however, meditates revenge and sends his three killers to take revenge on Franco, however this time he will be the one to get the better of them. After having foiled one last threat, that is the marriage with the ugly daughter of Don Vito, who chooses Kekkor instead, Franco can finally marry Unci and become a traffic policeman in Rome.

== Cast ==
- Franco Franchi: Franco
- Irina Maleeva: Unci Vuncia
- Gianni Agus: Master Kon-chi-lai
- Enzo Andronico: Master Lho-con-tè
- Nino Terzo: Ki Kaka Mai
- Giancarlo Fusco: Kekkor Nuto
- Gino Pagnani: Va a Fan

== See also ==
- List of Italian films of 1973
