= Enzo Cerusico =

Italian actor (1937–1991)

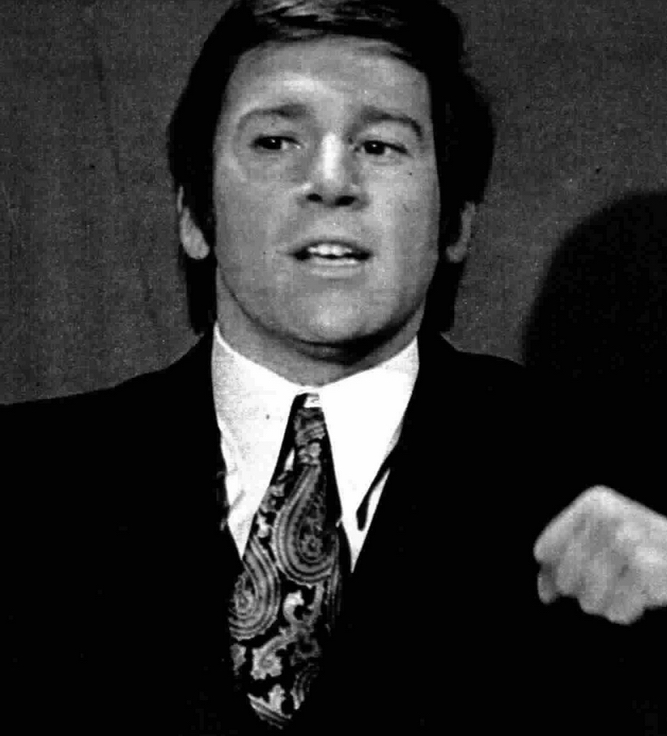
- Born: 22 October 1937; Rome, Kingdom of Italy
- Died: 26 November 1991 (aged 54); Rome, Italy
- Occupation: Actor

Enzo Cerusico (22 October 1937 – 26 November 1991) was an Italian film actor. He appeared in more than 50 films between 1948 and 1984.

== Life and career ==
The son of a production manager, Cerusico started his career as a child actor in 1948, playing a role of weight in Alessandro Blasetti's Heart and Soul. He studied acting first at the Accademia Sharoff and later with Alessandro Fersen, and had his breakout on stage in the 1960s, playing the title role in Meo Patacca.

=== Career in the United States ===
Cerusico's first role on American television was in a 1966 episode of I Spy filmed in Rome. Producer Sheldon Leonard held a casting call for an English-speaking actor to play the kid brother of the female Italian guest star. Cerusico spoke no English but with a friend's help he memorized one line — "I studied English in the school since four years" — and managed to bluff his way into an interview with Leonard.

Leonard realized Cerusico wasn't fluent in English but he thought the young man possessed "Jean Paul Belmondo's jaunty virility and the swaggering charm of Maurice Chevalier." Leonard chose Cerusico for the I Spy guest role and Cerusico learned his lines phonetically and delivered them by rote.

Cerusico later played the title character in My Friend Tony, an hour-long crime drama that aired on NBC in 1969.

== Personal life ==
Cerusico's family had hoped he would follow tradition and become a physician. But during his teen years, Cerusico realized he wouldn't be a good doctor and decided he "didn't want to be one among many, a mediocre."

While living in Los Angeles during filming of My Friend Tony, Enzo and Tiziana learned English by reading Ernest Hemingway's short stories and watching Walter Cronkite's evening newscasts. The couple used an audio tape recorder to record the CBS Evening News each night and replayed the tape three times, Enzo said: "First for the separate words, then for the sentences and finally to find out what the news was." Publicity materials released in 1969 for My Friend Tony gave the 32-year-old Cerusico's age as 25.

== Selected filmography ==
- Heart and Soul (1948) - Nelli
- Feathers in the Wind (1950) - Little patriot
- Brief Rapture (1951)
- I due derelitti (1951)
- Viva il cinema! (1952) - (uncredited)
- Red Shirts (1952) - Ciceruacchio's son
- In Olden Days (1952) - The drummer (segment "Il tamburino sardo")
- The Angels of the District (1952) - Il Capo
- La figlia del diavolo (1952)
- Una croce senza nome (1952)
- It's Never Too Late (1953) - Antonio Trabbi bambino
- Guendalina (1957) - Postino
- La Dolce Vita (1960) - Fotografo
- Il Mattatore (1960) - Benito Mesci (uncredited)
- Siege of Syracuse (1960) - Giovane allievo (uncredited)
- Colossus and the Amazon Queen (1960) - Menandro
- Il gobbo (1960) - Scheggia
- Ghosts of Rome (1961) - L'uomo corteggiamento giovane
- Tiro al piccione (1961) - Montaldo - the shepherd killed
- Cronache del '22 (1961) - (segment "Giorno di paga")
- Duel of the Titans (1961) - Numa Pompilio
- Pugni pupe e marinai (1961) - Raffaele Bottari
- Cartouche (1962) - Un bandit
- Duel of Fire (1962) - Policeman
- Hercules, Samson and Ulysses (1963) - Ulysses
- Blood and Black Lace (1964) - Gas Station Attendant
- In ginocchio da te (1964) - Gualtiero - cousin of Carla
- Extraconiugale (1964) - Manovale (segment "La doccia")
- Una storia di notte (1964) - Il Matto
- Mondo pazzo... gente matta! (1966) - Marco - The Cello Player
- Me, Me, Me... and the Others (1966)
- The Battle of the Mods (1966) - Gru (uncredited)
- Tre notti violente (1966)
- Maigret a Pigalle (1966) - Albert
- Mi vedrai tornare (1966) - Lt. Saro Spampinato
- Faustina (1968) - Enea Troiani
- Invasion (1970) - Piero Nato
- Per amore o per forza (1971)
- Master of Love (1972) - Romeo
- The Dead Are Alive (1972) - Alberto
- Meo Patacca (1972) - Marco Pepe
- Anche se volessi lavorare, che faccio? (1972) - Girasole
- No, the Case Is Happily Resolved (1973) - Fabio Santamaria
- The Five Days aka Le Cinque Giornate (1973) - Romolo Marcelli
- Zorro (1975) - Joaquín, Don Diego's Servant
- Strip First, Then We Talk (1975) - Alberto Donati
- A.A.A. cercasi spia... disposta spiare per conto spie (1976) - Giovanni Sebastiano Bacchi
- La lozana andaluza (1976) - Rampín
- Occhio alla vedova (1976)
- 7 ragazze di classe (1979) - Roberto Galíndez
- Scusi lei è normale? (1979) - Nicola Proietti / 'Nicole'
- Uno scugnizzo a New York (1984) - Anna's Father
- Treasure Island in Outer Space (1987, TV Mini-Series) - Augustine
