= Destination Miami: Objective Murder =

1964 Italian film directed by Piero Regnoli

Destination Miami: Objective Murder (Italian: Appuntamento a Dallas) is a 1964 Italian drama film directed by Piero Regnoli and featuring Claudio Gora, Bella Cortez and Nico Fidenco in lead roles.
