= Ubaldo Continiello =

Italian composer and conductor

- Born: 4 May 1941; Monteverde, Avellino
- Died: 20 January 2014 (aged 72); Rome

Ubaldo Continiello (4 May 1941 – 20 January 2014) was an Italian composer and conductor.

== Life and career ==
Born in Monteverde, Avellino, Continiello started his career as a composer of pop songs, for, among others, Tony Del Monaco and Bobby Solo.

He is best known as a composer of musical scores for films; he composed over 40 film scores, mainly for comedy films.

== Selected filmography ==
- Lola Colt (1967)
- I due gattoni a nove code... e mezza ad Amsterdam (1973)
- The Last Italian Tango (1973)
- Ku-Fu? Dalla Sicilia con furore (1973)
- Il trafficone (1974)
- Farfallon (1974)
- Il giustiziere di mezzogiorno (1975)
- Meet Him and Die (1976)
- Live Like a Cop, Die Like a Man (1976)
- L'affittacamere (1976)
- Ultimo mondo cannibale (1977)
- Gangbuster (1977)
- Last Feelings (1978)
- Voglia di donna (1978)
- La liceale, il diavolo e l'acquasanta (1979)
- Play Motel (1979)
- Blow Job (Soffio erotico) (1980)
- Macabre (1980)
- La liceale al mare con l'amica di papà (1980)
- Paulo Roberto Cotechiño centravanti di sfondamento (1983)
