= Il sindacalista =

- Directed by: Luciano Salce
- Written by: Franco Castellano; Giuseppe Moccia
- Cinematography: Erico Menczer
- Edited by: Antonio Siciliano
- Music by: Guido & Maurizio De Angelis
- Distributed by: Variety Distribution
- Release date: 1972
- Country: Italy
- Language: Italian

Il sindacalista (The Trade Unionist) is a 1972 Italian comedy film directed by Luciano Salce.

== Plot ==
The Sicilian worker Saverio Ravizzi (Buzzanca), just hired in a factory in Bergamo, begins to mobilize his fellow workers in better working conditions, unaware that his spontaneous activism is actually used as part of a larger financial plan by the owner of the factory.

== Cast ==
- Lando Buzzanca as Saverio Ravizzi
- Renzo Montagnani as Luigi Tamperletti
- Paola Pitagora as Vera
- Isabella Biagini as Teresa Piredda, wife of Saverio
- Giancarlo Maestri as Tonino Pagliari
- Dominique Boschero as Marisa
- Giacomo Rizzo as Stelvio De Paolis
- Gino Santercole as Labourer
- Piero Vida as Vezio Bellinelli
- Gianfranco Barra as Carabiniere
