= Canne mozze =

- Directed by: Mario Imperoli
- Written by: Mario Imperoli; Luigi Montefiori
- Starring: Antonio Sabàto; John Richardson; Ritza Brown; Attilio Dottesio
- Cinematography: Romano Albani
- Music by: Manuel De Sica
- Release date: August 5, 1977
- Language: Italian

Canne mozze ("Sawed-off Shotgun") is a 1977 Italian crime-thriller film written and directed by Mario Imperoli. It was the last film directed by Imperoli, who died in December 1977.

== Plot ==
Giovanni, a Mafia killer, escapes from prison and returns to his village in Sicily to avenge the death of his brother, who was killed by a member of a rival clan. Taking refuge in a villa that he believes to be abandoned, he is surprised by the wealthy couple who live there, Michele and Silvia. Michele proves to be a coward and is killed by their gardener, a member of the same faction as Giovanni, and Giovanni and Silvia begin a relationship. He successfully kills his brother's killers, but not before they kill the gardener and rape Silvia. He then massacres the remaining members of the other faction, but dies doing so.

== Cast ==
- Antonio Sabàto as Giovanni Molé
- Ritza Brown as Silvia
- John Richardson as Michele
- Attilio Dottesio as Don Carrara

== Production and release ==
Canne Mozze was filmed at the Incir - De Paolis studios in Rome and released on August 5, 1977.

== See also ==
- List of Italian films of 1977
