= Erotomania (film) =

1974 film

- Directed by: Marco Vicario
- Written by: Marco Vicario
- Starring: Gastone Moschin; Janet Agren; Isabella Biagini; Milena Vukotic
- Cinematography: Giuseppe Rotunno
- Edited by: Nino Baragli
- Music by: Riz Ortolani
- Distributed by: Medusa Distribuzione
- Release date: 1974
- Language: Italian

Erotomania (Italian: L'erotomane, lit. 'The erotomaniac') is a 1974 commedia sexy all'italiana film co-written and directed by Marco Vicario and starring Gastone Moschin.

== Cast ==
- Gastone Moschin as Rodolfo Persichetti
- Janet Agren as Ciccia
- Isabella Biagini as Dr. Bonetti
- Milena Vukotic as Cleofe
- Vittorio Caprioli as Minister Terenzio Arraffone
- Jacques Dufilho as Prof. Pazzoni
- Neda Arnerić as Marietta
- Silvia Dionisio as Claretta
- Maria Antonietta Beluzzi as Gertrude
- Ugo Fangareggi as Claudio
- Paola Senatore as Belloni
- Jacques Herlin as the Surgeon
- Loredana Martinez as Insp. Giovannelli
- Giacomo Rizzo as Agent Campanella
- Livio Galassi as Walter
- Paolo Paoloni as Tappatani
- Carla Brait as the Mulatto Dancer
- Mario Colli as the Administrator

== Production ==
The film was produced by Atlantica Produzioni Cinematografiche. It was shot at De Paolis studios in Rome.

== Release ==
The film was released in Italian cinemas by Medusa on 30 October 1974.

== Reception ==
The film was a box office success, grossing domestically over 1.27 billion lire. It was generally badly received by critics. Maurizio Porro from Corriere della Sera described the film as "lacking even a single idea capable of sustaining it", in which everything is "trite, dated [...], pointlessly and irritatingly in bad taste".
