= Ray Lovelock (actor) =

Italian actor and musician (1950–2017)

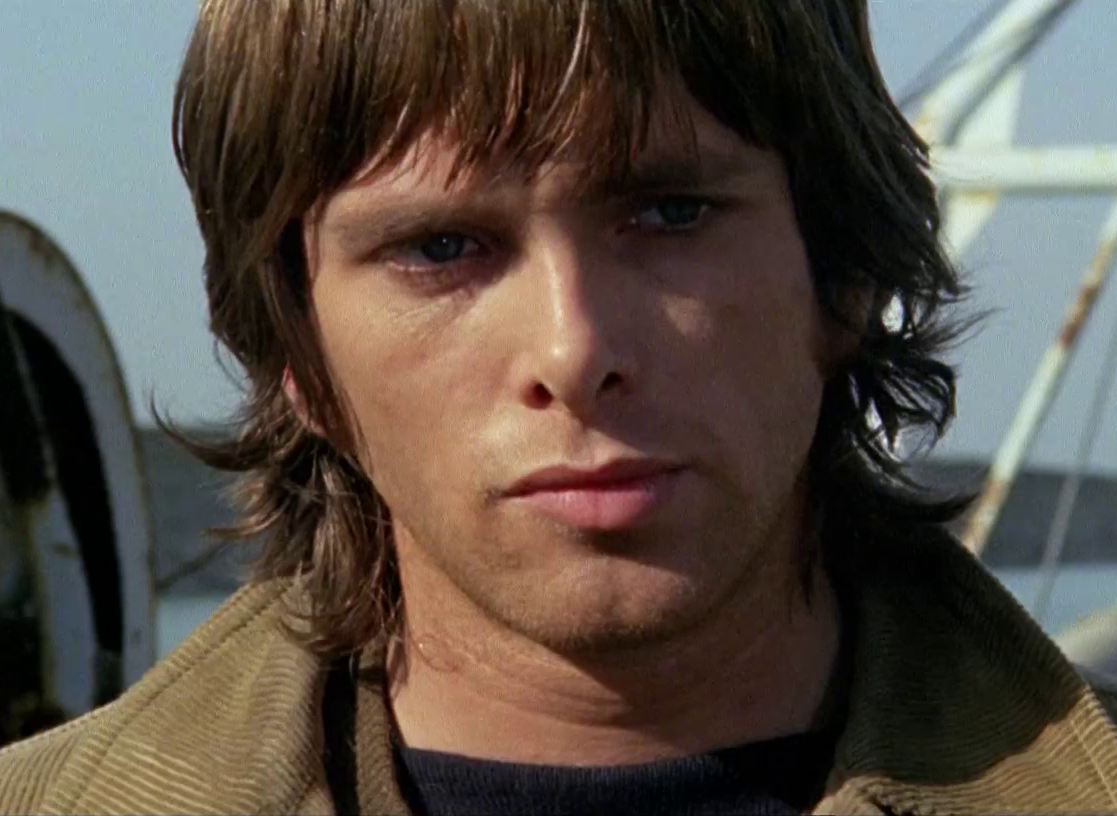
- Ray Lovelock in Almost Human (1974)
- Born: 19 June 1950; Rome, Italy
- Died: 10 November 2017 (aged 67); Trevi, Umbria, Italy
- Occupations: Actor, musician
- Years active: 1964–2015

Raymond Lovelock (19 June 1950 – 10 November 2017) was an Italian actor and musician, best known for his roles in genre films.

== Early life ==
Lovelock was born in Rome on 19 June 1950. His mother was Italian and his father was English. They met during the Allied occupation of Italy in World War II. While at college, he supplemented his income as an extra in movies and TV commercials. He also performed in a rock band with longtime friend and actor Tomas Milian, where he was discovered by a talent agent.

== Career ==
=== Acting career ===
Lovelock played his first credited movie part in the Spaghetti Western Se sei vivo spara (1967), directed by Giulio Questi and starring Milian. His breakthrough role came the following year in the crime thriller Bandits in Milan, as bank robber Donato 'Tuccio' Lopez. The film was a hit with critics and won several awards. He then established himself as both a reliable character actor and a leading man in Italian films and television, working steadily from the late 1960s.

Among his more notable film roles are Fiddler on the Roof (where he played Fyedka, a Russian Christian farmer who marries a Jewish girl named Chava, against the wishes of Chava's father; 1971), Let Sleeping Corpses Lie (1974), Almost Human (1974), Violent Rome (1975), Live Like a Cop, Die Like a Man (1976), The Cassandra Crossing (1976), and The Last House on the Beach (1978). Later in his career he worked mostly in television, including a guest role on Mia And Me (2014).

=== Music career ===
In Italy, he released 10 singles, which included the main theme song of Live Like a Cop, Die Like a Man. He also released two singles in Japan, one of which "Koi Wa Kaze" reached #34 on the Japanese Oricon chart in 1970. His album, "All about Raymond Lovelock" also charted that year and peaked at #19.

== Personal life ==
An avid football fan, Lovelock was a member of ItalianAttori, a celebrity team that held charity matches.

== Death ==
He died in Trevi on 10 November 2017, at the age of 67 of cancer.

== Filmography ==
=== Film ===
Year	Title	Role	Notes
1967	Django Kill... If You Live, Shoot!	Evan Templer	
1968	Seven Times Seven	Mildred's Lover	Uncredited
1968	Bandits in Milan	Donato 'Tuccio' Lopez	
1969	Plagio	Guido	
1969	Rabbit in the Pit	Brian	
1969	Oh, Grandmother's Dead	Carlo Alberto Ghia	
1969	L'amica	Claudio Nervi	
1970	Queens of Evil	David	
1971	Oasis of Fear	Dick Butler	
1971	Fiddler on the Roof	Fyedka	
1973	One Russian Summer	Yuri	
1973	Un modo di essere donna	Vasco	
1974	Emergency Squad	Micheli	
1974	The King is the Best Mayor	Sancho	
1974	Almost Human	Carmine	
1974	Let Sleeping Corpses Lie	George Meaning	
1975	Autopsy	Riccardo	
1975	Violent Rome	Biondi	
1975	La moglie vergine	Giovannino Arrighini	
1976	Live Like a Cop, Die Like a Man	Antonio	
1976	Meet Him and Die	Massimo Torlani	
1976	The Cassandra Crossing	Tom	
1977	The Virgo, the Taurus and the Capricorn	Patrizio Marchi	
1977	Gangbuster	Avvocato Mario Gastali	
1978	The Greatest Battle	Lt. John Foster	
1978	The Last House on the Beach	Aldo	
1978	Being Twenty	Rico	
1979	L'anello matrimoniale	Mario	
1979	From Hell to Victory	Jim Rosson	
1979	Scusi lei è normale?	Franco Astuti	
1979	Play Motel	Roberto	
1980	L'ebreo fascista	Oberdan Rossi	
1984	Murder Rock	George Webb	
1988	Mak P 100	Commandante Di Carlo	
1998	La vuelta de El Coyote	Edmond Greene	
1999	Una vita non violenta	Blind guitar player	Uncredited
2000	Il fratello minore	Anna's Father	
2000	Primetime Murder	Adam	
2012	The World of Hemingway	Old Ernest Hemingway	
2013	Midday Demons	Von Galen	
2015	Barbara ed Io		
2016	My Father Jack	avv. Pontecorvo	

=== Television ===
Year	Title	Role	Notes
1981	La casa rossa	Lamberto	Miniseries
1982	Una tranquilla coppia di killer	Michael Townley	Miniseries
1983	L'amante dell'Orsa Maggiore	Sergio	7 episodes
1984	La ragazza dell'addio	Martino	4 episodes
1985	I due prigionieri	Pietro	Television film
1985	A viso coperto	Albino Sedda	Television film
1986	Mino	Michele	Miniseries
1987	Uomo contro uomo	Carini	Television film
1988	Sentiments	Andrew de Michelis	Episode: "Manu"
1990	La piovra	Simon Barth	Episode #5.1
1991	Un bambino in fuga - Tre anni dopo	Tatò	3 episodes
1992	Un posto freddo in fondo al cuore	Inspector Soriano	Television film
1992	Brigada Central	Thompson	Episode: "Érase una vez dos polis"
1993	La ragnatela 2	Motola	Miniseries
1993	Private Crimes	Inspector Stefano Avanza	Miniseries
1994	Moscacieca	Dr. Ruby	Television film
1995	Vite a termine	Vittorio	Television film
1996	Addio e ritorno	Betti	Television film
1997	Mamma per caso	Stefano Arrighi	Miniseries
1999	A due passi dal cielo	Andrea	Television film
1999	Commesse	Luca Massimi	Episodes: "Marta" & "Roberta"
1999	Non lasciamoci più	Marco Aliprandi	Episode: "Un caso di famiglia"
1999	Villa Ada	Giovanni	Television film
1999	Turbo	Fabio Dazzi	Episode: "Riflessi di un delitto"
2000	Tequila & Bonetti	Roberto Brinci	Episode: "Uno Sbirro, un cane, e una fotografia"
2000-01	Ricominciare	Luciano	200 episodes
2001	Inviati speciali	Marco Venturi	Television film
2001-03	Incantesimo	Dr. Hans Rudolph	37 episodes
2002	Lo zio d'America	Gianluigi Patrizi	8 episodes
2004	Don Matteo	Professor Ridolfi	Episode: "L'amore rubato"
2005-10	My Daughters	Attilio Pensiero	18 episodes
2006	L'ultimo rigore 2	Massimo Normanni	Television film
2006	L'onore e il rispetto	Everaldo De Nisi	6 episodes
2006-07	Raccontami	Marco's Grandfather	4 episodes
2008	Capri	Palmieri	3 episodes
2011	Inspector Rex	Augusto Varinelli	Episode: 'I nomi delle stelle"
2011	Un amore e una vendetta	Alberto Castellani	8 episodes
2015	Mia and Me	Uncle Renzo	Episodes: "The Ghost of Blackwood Forest" & "The Mysterious Visitor"
2016	L'allieva	Paul Malcomess	10 episodes
