= Blue Jeans (1975 film) =

1975 film

- Directed by: Mario Imperoli
- Written by: Piero Regnoli; Mario Imperioli
- Produced by: Roma Cinematografica
- Starring: Gloria Guida; Paolo Carlini
- Cinematography: Romano Albani
- Music by: Nico Fidenco
- Release date: 17 March 1975
- Running time: 86 minutes
- Country: Italy
- Language: Italian

Blue Jeans is a 1975 Italian erotic-drama film directed by Mario Imperoli and starring Gloria Guida.

== Plot ==
Daniela (Gloria Guida), nicknamed "Blue Jeans" after her cut-off jean shorts, is an underage streetwalker. She is caught by the police and claims that she is the illegitimate daughter of Dr. Carlo Anselmi (Paolo Carlini), a renowned restoration artist living in Latina countryside. Although Anselmi claims the opposite, Daniela's word is taken as a presumption of law and she is entrusted to Anselmi. Anselmi quickly bonds with his supposed newfound daughter, however their borderline-incestuous attraction causes friction with Anselmi's girlfriend Marisa (Annie Carol Edel). Things get further complicated when Daniela becomes involved with a mysterious man, Sergio (Gianluigi Chirizzi).

== Cast ==
- Gloria Guida as Daniela
- Paolo Carlini as Dr. Carlo Anselmi
- Annie Carol Edel as Marisa
- Gianluigi Chirizzi as Sergio Prandi
- Mario Pisu as Lawyer Mauro Franco
- Marco Tulli as Client

== Reception ==
=== Box office ===
The film grossed about 310 million lire at the Italian box office.

=== Critical response ===
The film critic Vittorio Spiga referred to the film as "an adult comic book that flows into a real exaltation of the remarkable ass of Gloria Guida".
