= Tomaso Catullo =

Doctor Tommaso Antonio Catullo
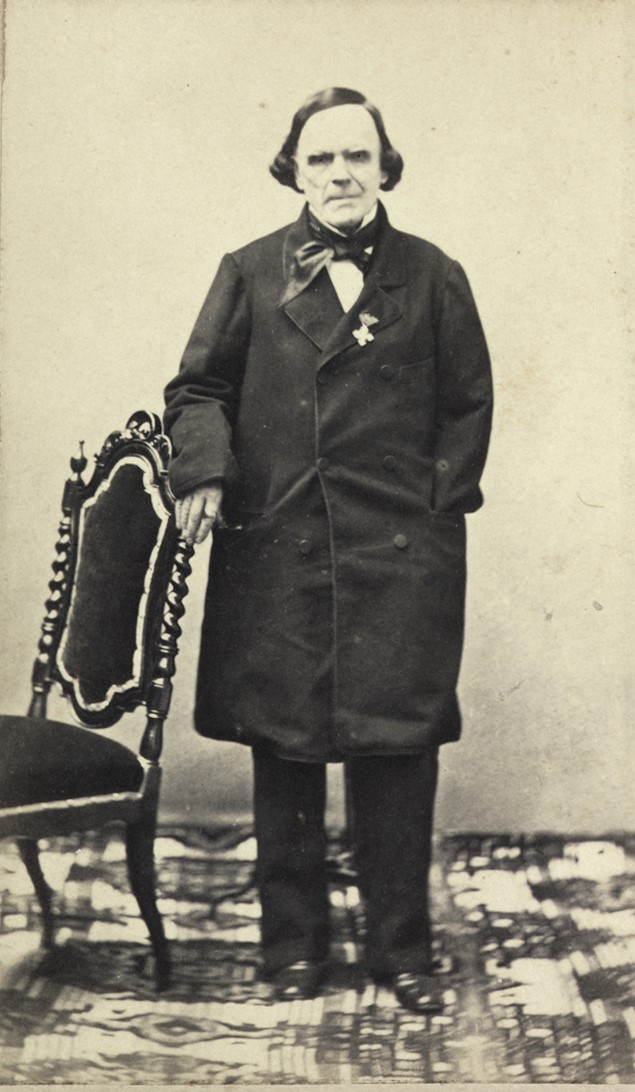

Rector of the University of Padua
- In office 1843–1844
- Monarch: Ferdinand I of Austria
- Preceded by: ?
- Succeeded by: ?

Head of the Cabinet of Natural History of the University of Padua
- In office 1829–1851
- Preceded by: Stefano Andrea Renier
- Succeeded by: Raffaele Molin

Personal details
- Born: 9 July 1782 Belluno, Kingdom of Lombardy–Venetia
- Died: 13 April 1869 (aged 86) Padua, Kingdom of Italy
- Occupation: botanic geologist naturalist paleontologist writer tailor (in his youth)
- Profession: education medicine

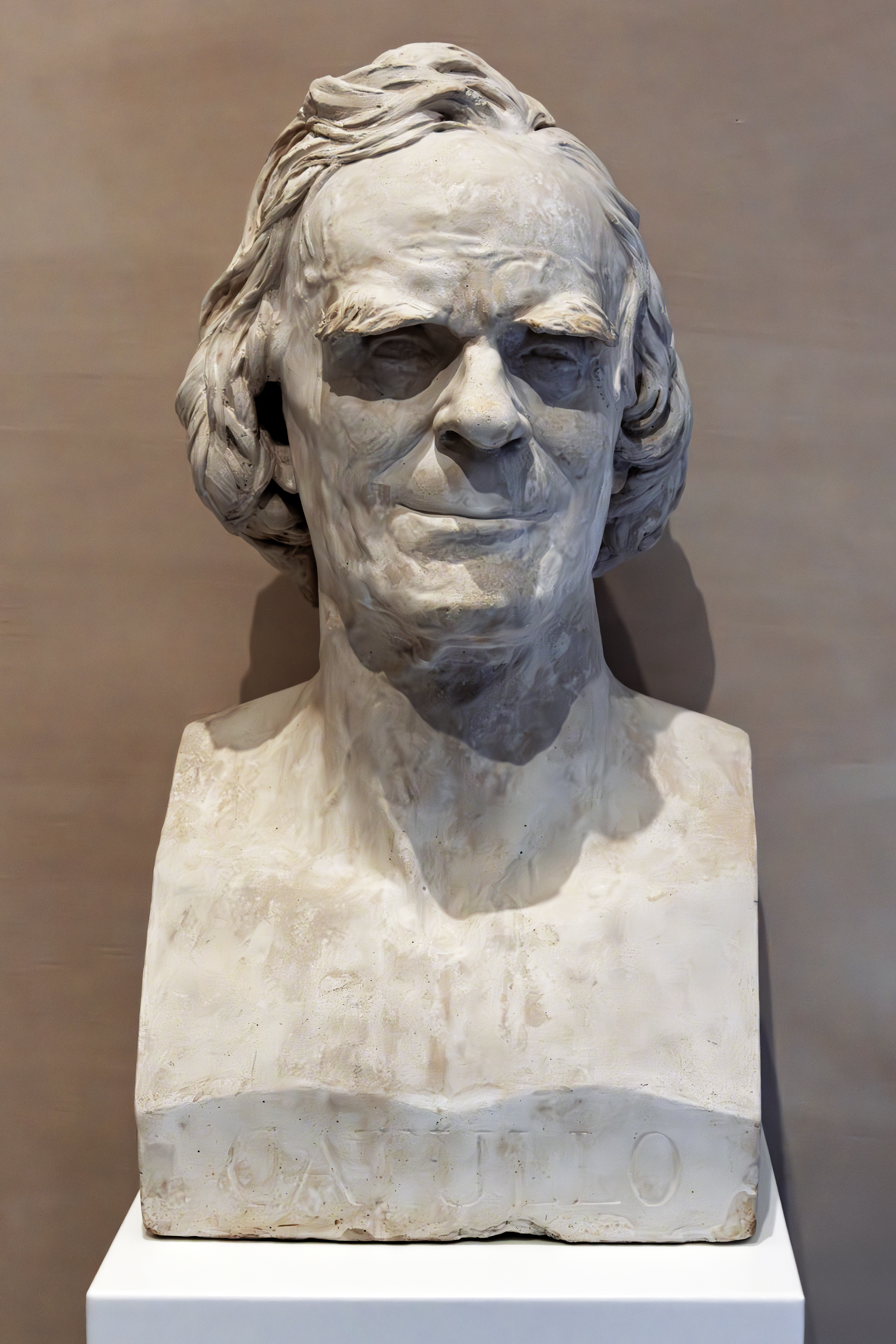
Bust of Tomaso Antonio Catullo in Museo Civico Luigi Bailo Treviso

Tomaso Catullo (1782–1869) was a Venetian medical doctor, geologist, paleontologist, zoologist and educator of outstanding work in the University of Padua.

He was born in Belluno, Northern Italy, the son of a middle-class Venetian family. He did his elemental studies in his hometown and was graduated from the University of Padua around 1806. In 1811, he was appointed, Professor of Natural History in Lyceum of Belluno. For his outstanding work Catullo gets, Chair of Natural History in the University of Padua, in the year 1829. He also received an honorary doctorate delivered by the University of Padua in 1833.

In 1840 he was appointed as a member of Accademia nazionale delle scienze. He was the author of numerous publications, including Manuale mineralogico, 1812, Saggio di zoologia fossile, 1827, Catalogo ragionato degli animali vertebrati, 1838, Osservazioni sopra uno scritto del Achille de Zigno, 1847, and Dei terreni di sedimento superiore delle Venezie, 1856.
