= Joseph Lee Hooker =

American singer-songwriter

Joseph Lee Hooker is an American pop, Christian, and inspirational music singer and songwriter. Born near Philadelphia, Pennsylvania, Hooker has achieved his largest successes with Roman Catholic-themed music, including Singing the Rosary and Our Priests. His latest album, Heaven's On Its Way, was released in March 2011.

== Personal life ==
Hooker was born in Wilmington, Delaware and raised in Linwood, Pennsylvania, a Philadelphia suburb. He wrote mainly secular pop and rock-n-roll music with positive, patriotic, inspirational or environmentalist messages until the early 1980s, when he felt God calling him to focus his music more directly on spiritual themes. For a time, he put his secular music aside to devote his time to "Singing the Rosary", a fully sung and orchestrated version of the holy rosary. The first of its kind, "Singing the Rosary" was given to Pope John Paul II in 1991.

Eventually his faith, and his self-admitted need for conversion, led him to Medjugorje, in present-day Bosnia and Herzegovina, where on Easter Sunday of 1990, he met his wife, Bridget, an American also on a pilgrimage. The two were married soon after, and his wife often accompanies him on his albums as a producer, backup vocalist and co-composer.

Hooker is known in Pennsylvania's Delaware Valley for his advocacy and untiring environmentalist efforts as president of We Are the People, Inc., an environmental advocacy group that he founded to fight pollution in his neighboring town of Marcus Hook.

Hooker is a photographer and the copyright holder of two photographs, "The Good Shepherd" and "The White Cross", both taken in Medjugorje that have attained worldwide attention. These photos depict what many claim is a "miracle" or a "divine manifestation" in the clouds.

Hooker and Hylak's first son, Luke John, died as a child from liver cancer; this tragedy has profoundly influenced Hooker's later music and spirituality. The family now resides in West Grove, Pennsylvania, where they own a multilingual web design and ASCAP music publishing company, Come Alive Communications, Inc.

== Career ==
=== Our Priests ===
Perhaps Hooker's greatest acclaim came in 2009 with Our Priests, a short album whose eponymous lead single garnered awards from Roman Catholic societies worldwide. This first track voices support for the countless Catholic priests who live selfless lives of devotion to the Church while a relative few fuel the institution's scandal. Pope Benedict XVI bestowed an Apostolic Blessing on the work in February 2010.

== Discography ==
- Hello World (1985)
- Singing the Rosary (1988)
- Mighty God of Medjugorje (1991)
- Say Yes to Jesus (1992)
- God Calling (1993)
- Say Yes to Life (1996)
- Apostles of the Last Days (1997)
- Millennium Celebration & Philadelphia version (1999)
- Our Priests (2009)
- Heaven's On Its Way (2011)
