= Tom Felleghy =

Hungarian-Italian actor (1921–2005)

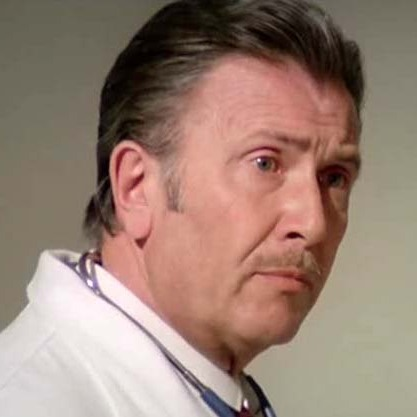
- Felleghy in Hallucination Strip (1975)
- Born: Tamás Fellegi; 26 November 1921; Budapest, Kingdom of Hungary
- Died: 13 September 2005 (aged 83); Bracciano, Lazio, Italy
- Other names: Tom Felleghi; Tommaso Felleghi
- Occupation: Actor
- Years active: 1958–1991

Tamás Fellegi (Hungarian: Fellegi Tamás; 26 November 1921 – 13 September 2005), known as Tom Felleghy, was a Hungarian-Italian actor, who appeared in more than 200 films and television series from 1958.

== Biography ==
Felleghy was born in Budapest in 1921. He studied at the Academy of Drama and was active as an actor and director in the theatre. Following the Hungarian Revolution of 1956, he moved to Italy with his friend John Bartha, where he found a new career as a character actor in films.

Felleghy became well-known to genre film fans for his many supporting roles in various Spaghetti Western, Eurospy, Euro War, giallo and horror films. Thanks to his stereotypically "posh" appearance, he often portrayed lawyers, lawmen, doctors, military officers, aristocrats, and other upper-class characters. He played his only leading role in the 1964 Norwegian film Marenco. From 1967 to 1974, he recurred on the advertising program Carosello,, where he was a spokesperson for Cynar (among other products).

Felleghy died in Bracciano, Lazio on 13 September 2005, at the age of 83.

== Partial filmography ==
Year	Title	Role	Notes
1964	Marenco	Carlo Marenco	
1965	I due toreri	Pierre	Credited as Tom Felleghi
1965	For One Thousand Dollars Per Day		
1966	Arizona Colt	Will	
1966	El Rojo	Sheriff	
1967	Kill Me Quick, I'm Cold	Dick Marton	
1967	Desert Commandos	Colonel Ross	
1967	Halleluja for Django		
1967	The Fantastic Argoman	General Headwood	
1967	Lola Colt	Don Rodriguez	
1968	Hell in Normandy	Colonel Voller	Uncredited
1969	The Archangel	Fabris	
1969	Death Knocks Twice	Berry	Credited as Tom Felleghi
1970	Hornets' Nest	Colonel Jannings	
1971	His Name Was King		
1973	The Age of the Medici		
1973	The Bloody Hands of the Law		
1975	Kidnap Syndicate		
1976	Live Like a Cop, Die Like a Man	Major	
1978	Emanuelle and the White Slave Trade		
1978	Covert Action		
