= Claudio Giorgi =

Italian film director and actor

- Born: Claudio Giorgiutti; 1944 (age 81–82); Tarcento, Udine
- Other name: Claudio de Molinis
- Occupations: Film director Actor

Claudio Giorgi (born in 1944) is an Italian actor and film director, active between the 1970s and the early 1980s.

== Life and career ==
Born Claudio Giorgiutti in Tarcento, Udine, Giorgi was mainly active as a main actor in fotoromanzi, while he occasionally played supporting roles in several genre films. From the mid-1970s he also worked as a production secretary and then as a film director, often credited under the pseudonym Claudio de Molinis. For two of his films he also contributed the screenplay.

== Filmography ==
As a director

- Ancora una volta... a Venezia (1975)
- L'unica legge in cui credo (1976)
- Candido Erotico (1978)
- La febbre americana (1978)
- Tranquille donne di compagna (1980)
- There is a Ghost in My Bed (1981)

As an actor

- Yellow Emanuelle (1976)
