= Mario Imperoli =

Italian director and producer

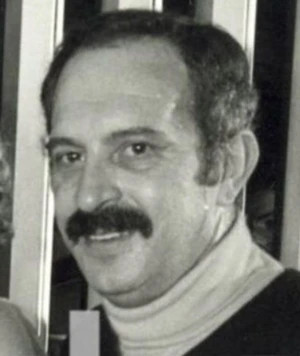
- Photo of Imperoli
- Born: 24 June 1931; Rome, Italy
- Died: 24 December 1977 (aged 46); Rome, Italy
- Occupation: Film director

Mario Imperoli (24 June 1931 – 24 December 1977) was an Italian director, producer, screenwriter and journalist.

Born in Rome, Imperoli started his career as a journalist for several magazines and newspapers. He entered the cinema industry in 1970, as the screenwriter and producer of the Vittorio De Sisti's giallo L'interrogatorio. He later directed eight films, often characterized by erotic themes. He directed Gloria Guida in her debut film, Monika.

== Filmography ==
- Mia moglie, un corpo per l'amore (1972)
- Monika (La ragazzina, 1974)
- Snapshot of a Crime (Istantanea per un delitto, 1974)
- Blue Jeans (1975)
- Le dolci zie (1975)
- Like Rabid Dogs (Come cani arrabbiati, 1976)
- Quella strana voglia d'amare (1977)
- Canne mozze (1977)
