= Meet Him and Die =

- Directed by: Franco Prosperi
- Screenplay by: Peter Berling; Antonio Cucca; Claudio Fragasso; Alberto Marras
- Story by: Peter Berling; Antonio Cucca; Claudio Fragasso; Alberto Marras
- Produced by: Alberto Marras; Vincenzo Salvini
- Starring: Ray Lovelock; Martin Balsam; Elke Sommer
- Cinematography: Roberto D'Ettorre Piazzoli
- Edited by: Amedeo Giomini
- Music by: Ubaldo Continiello
- Production companies: T.L.D. Cinematografica; Hermes Synchron
- Distributed by: Over Seas Film Company
- Release dates: 9 October 1976 (Italy); 28 July 1977 (West Germany)
- Running time: 95 minutes
- Countries: Italy; West Germany
- Box office: ₤344.183 million

Meet Him and Die (Italian: Pronto ad uccidere) is a 1976 poliziotteschi film directed by Franco Prosperi and starring Ray Lovelock, Martin Balsam and Elke Sommer.

== Cast ==
- Ray Lovelock - Massimo Torlani
- Martin Balsam - Giulianelli
- Elke Sommer - Secretary
- Heinz Domez - Piero
- Ettore Manni - Perrone
- Peter Berling - Bavoso
- Riccardo Cucciolla - Commissioner Sacchi
- Ernesto Colli - Settecapelli

== Style ==
Italian film historian Roberto Curti described Meet Him and Die as a turning point for poliziotteschi's approach to justice in film as the genre "no longer considers justice"

== Release ==
Meet Him and Die was distributed theatrically in Italy by Over Seas Film Company on 9 October 1976. It grossed a total of 344,182,575 Italian lira domestically. In West Germany, the film was titled Tote pflastern seinen Weg and was released on 28 July 1977.

On its release on home video in the United Kingdom, the film received the alternative title Risking, Pronto!.

== See also ==
- List of Italian films of 1976
