= Neomelodic music =

Musical style originating in Naples, Italy

- Native name: Musica neomelodica
- Etymology: From neo (new) and melodico (melodic), indicating a modern continuation of melodic Neapolitan traditions
- Other names: neomelodico
- Stylistic origins: Canzone Napoletana, Sceneggiata, Italian pop music
- Cultural origins: 1970s, Naples, Italy

Regional scenes
- Southern Italy (especially Naples)

Local scenes
- Naples urban peripheries

Other topics
- CamorraSceneggiata Gomorrah (book) Music of Naples Organized crime in Italy Neapolitan language Italian popular music Sociology of music

Neomelodic music, or musica neomelodica, sometimes just neomelodico is a musical style originating from the Italian city of Naples.

Some performers in the Neomelodic scene have been criticised for glorifying crime in their songs.

== Style ==
It is a peculiar borderland of aesthetics concerning music and everything else in the society in which it is created. Most artists that may be considered neomelodics often have more musical differences between them than common denominators. Neomelodic music is a celebration for those involved and a pejorative term with political implications for those outside. The geographical area that is its homeland consists of every suburb, smalltown, and province between Romanina (Rome, Lazio, Italy) and Catania (Sicily, Italy) with its absolute epicenter in the working-class inner-city and peripherical areas of Naples (Campania, Italy).

Neomelodic music draws on Naples' long history of street entertainment including Commedia dell'arte and La sceneggiata napoletana. The first wave of what is considered as neomelodic was a renaissance of the sceneggiata form, including its typical themes of betrayal, class society, and crime, in the early 1970s. The main pioneers of the neomelodica were the singers Mario Merola and Nino D'Angelo with their numerous collaborations and duets, in films and in pop songs, as well as in musicals, in the 1970s and 1980s. The duet is typical for the neomelodic form as it continues and develops the dramatic form of the sceneggiata in which a troubled main character always must struggle against an antagonist to make his way forward.

Apart from the duet being a common form, there are chord progressions that are commonly used in neomelodica. The first wave of neomelodica (ca 1970–1985) often mixed traditional Neapolitan forms of music, like the neoclassical Neapolitan music including world famous songs such as "'O sole mio", "Tu si na cosa grande" and "O surdato nnammurato", that itself is a combination of general European aesthetic, occasionally with Spanish and Arabic influences. The second wave (late 1980s until present) however has a fixation on the melodic progressions typically starting the verses on the VI chord in the major scale and progressing over the 4ths, and the choruses starting on the II chord in the major scale and progressing over the same 4ths.

The complete dominance of a specific chord progression serves many purposes:

1. any bar pianist or busking guitar player can play 50% of modern-day neomelodica without ever before having heard the song that a singer requests
2. the crowds at the concerts can attend (and sing along to) any concert without having had to listen to the artists' songs before as they already know which note that follows
3. professional musicians in the genre become interchangeable so it matters less if someone is absent at the time of a performance
4. the songwriters can focus on putting as much sentiment as possible into the lyrics, and decoration, since the chords and melody are already there
5. the singers can perform long medleys covering their whole careers, without barely changing chord progression

The theme of a neomelodic lyric is always direct. The message is clear and there is little room for allegory or irony. A typical theme is that of betrayal, taking the recipe from la sceneggiata in which women are the ones that destroy decent families. (e.g. "Nun voglio fà l'amante" by Nancy and Nico Desideri). Other themes include forbidden love (e.g. "Maestra e pianoforte" by Nino D'Angelo and "L'amica e mammà" by Luciano Caldore), class betrayal (e.g. "Faje ammore cu Secondigliano" by Ida Rendano), celebrating love and the desire to marry (e.g. "Per sempre" by Raffaello and "Un ragazzo da sposare" by Emiliana Cantone), and numerous other themes that however always stick to a perceived reality of one or more young persons living in Naples.

It is to a great extent the absence of conceptualism that is the trademark of neomelodica, and this absence, in turn, becomes an ever-present presence. Perhaps a good example of this non-ironic irony is the song (and the music video) "Nun t'ho negà" by Mimmo Dany. The more the singers manage to make their listeners suffer with them as they get to hear their private phone conversations (e.g. "Dammi un'occasione" by Emiliana Cantone and Alessio or "Basta" by Emiliana Cantone and Leo Ferrucci) or get to read their text messages (e.g. "Sms" by Alessio), the more they have succeeded in creating the cultural loop of "napolitanità" between people that already are Neapolitans.

== Language ==
The language mainly used in neomelodica is Neapolitan. In order to communicate efficiently to their crowds, the music needs to be sung in the dialect spoken in different variants from the southern parts of Lazio, all over Campania, and into the northern parts of Calabria. The nuances, remarks, jokes and intertextual message would probably be lost if the songs were to be sung in Italian. A few attempts have been made to Italianize the neomelodica but it seems the artists always go back to their mother tongue afterward.

In many parts of Italy listening to music sung in Neapolitan is heavily frowned upon, and although the Neapolitan artists translate their songs into Italian to reach for a bigger crowd and higher income, the neomelodic style distinctly marks the music. This, in turn, has led to many restaurant owners in Italy to forbid their performers to perform this music and to politicians wanting to ban it.

== Prominent artists ==
A few of the most prominent artists known as neomelodics are:

- Nino D'Angelo
- Nicola de Pane
- Mario Merola
- Patrizio
- Mauro Nardi
- Tommy Riccio
- Gigi D'Alessio
- Ida Rendano
- Franco Ricciardi
- Ivan Granatino
- Tony Colombo
- Nancy Coppola
- Rita Del Sorbo
- Alessio
- Raffaello
- Giusy Attanasio
- Leo Ferrucci
- Mimmo Dany
- Anthony
- Luciano Caldore
- Gianni Fiorellino
- Gianluca Capozzi
- Gianni Celeste
- Rosario Miraggio
- Gianni Vezzosi
- Daniele De Martino
- Nino Fiorello
- Natale Galletta
- Antonio Cutrone
- Franz Falcone
- Niko Pandetta
- Marco Calone
- Ernesto Matacena
- Matteo
- Kekko Dany
- Nico Desideri
- Jay Creti
