= Rondinella (surname) =

Rondinella is an Italian surname. Notable people with the surname include:

- Giacomo Rondinella (1923–2015), Italian singer and actor
- Luciano Rondinella (died 2020), Italian singer and actor
