= Tradimento (film) =

- Directed by: Alfonso Brescia
- Release date: 1982
- Country: Italy
- Language: Italian

Tradimento is a 1982 musical comedy film by Alfonso Brescia featuring Mario Merola, Antonio Allocca, and Nino D'Angelo set in Naples. The soundtrack contains several Neapolitan songs.

== Soundtrack ==
- Acquarello napoletano (Benedetto - Bonagura) sung by Mario Merola
- Ndringhete ndrà (Cinquegrana - De Gregorio) sung by Mario Merola
- Tradimento (music Eduardo Alfieri - lyrics Salvatore Palomba) sung by Mario Merola
- Ballammo (V. Annona - De Paolis - D'Angelo) sung by Nino D'Angelo
- Che si pè me (R. Fiore - De Paolis - D'Angelo) sung by Nino D'Angelo
