= Biagio Pelligra =

Italian stage, film, and television actor

- Born: 24 June 1937 (age 88); Comiso, Ragusa
- Occupation: actor

Biagio Pelligra (born 24 June 1937, in Comiso) is an Italian stage, film and television actor.

== Life and career ==
Born in Comiso, Province of Ragusa, Pelligra started his acting career in the second half of the sixties, and after several minor roles he got his first role of weight in 1972, in Marco Leto's Black Holiday. Following the critical success of the film, from then he started appearing, often in secondary roles, in several art films, working with Roberto Rossellini, Paolo and Vittorio Taviani, Marco Tullio Giordana and Peter Del Monte, among others. Pelligra's popularity is however mainly linked to a series of poliziotteschi, sceneggiate and mafia films, in which he specialized in roles of criminals and villains.

== Partial filmography ==
- Shoot Loud, Louder... I Don't Understand (1966)
- Death Laid an Egg (1968) - Chemical operator
- Commandos (1968) - Carmelo
- L'alibi (1969)
- Under the Sign of Scorpio (1969)
- Le 10 meraviglie dell'amore (1969) - Turi
- Joe Dakota (1972) - Banker (uncredited)
- Black Holiday (1973) - Mastrodonato
- Allonsanfàn (1974) - priest
- Anno uno (1974)
- Irene, Irene (1975)
- La Cecilia (1975) - Tullio
- Il marsigliese (1975) - Gigino Puleo
- Al piacere di rivederla (1976) - Marshal of Carabinieri
- The Tough Ones (1976) - Savelli
- Free Hand for a Tough Cop (1976) - Calabrese
- Bloody Payroll (1976) - Tropea
- Antonio Gramsci: The Days of Prison (1977) - Bruno
- Il mammasantissima (1979) - Don Salvatore Bufalo
- From Corleone to Brooklyn (1979) - Scalia
- Improvviso (1979) - Lo zio Luigi
- To Love the Damned (1980) - Police commissioner
- Zappatore (1980) - Accountant D'Inzillo
- The Mafia Triangle (1981) - Coppola
- Carcerato (1981) - Nicola Esposito
- L'Ombre rouge (1981)
- Laura... a 16 anni mi dicesti sì (1983) - Tito
- The Professor (1986) - The Father
- Women in Arms (1991) - Antonio Guidotti
- The Saracen Woman (La Sarrasine) (1992) - Salvatore Moschella
- Who Killed Pasolini? (1995) - Police officer
- An Eyewitness Account (1997) - Police Commissioner De Lio
- La collezione invisibile (2003) - Caruso
- I Vicerè (2007) - Baldassarre
- Il Capo dei Capi (2007, TV Mini-Series) - Pietro Scaglione
