= Music of Naples =

Naples has played an important and vibrant role over the centuries not just in the music of Italy, but in the general history of western European musical traditions. This influence extends from the early music conservatories in the 16th century through the music of Alessandro Scarlatti during the Baroque period and the comic operas of Pergolesi, Piccinni and, eventually, Rossini and Mozart. The vitality of Neapolitan popular music from the late 19th century has made such songs as'O Sole mio and Funiculì Funiculà a permanent part of our musical consciousness.

== Classical music ==
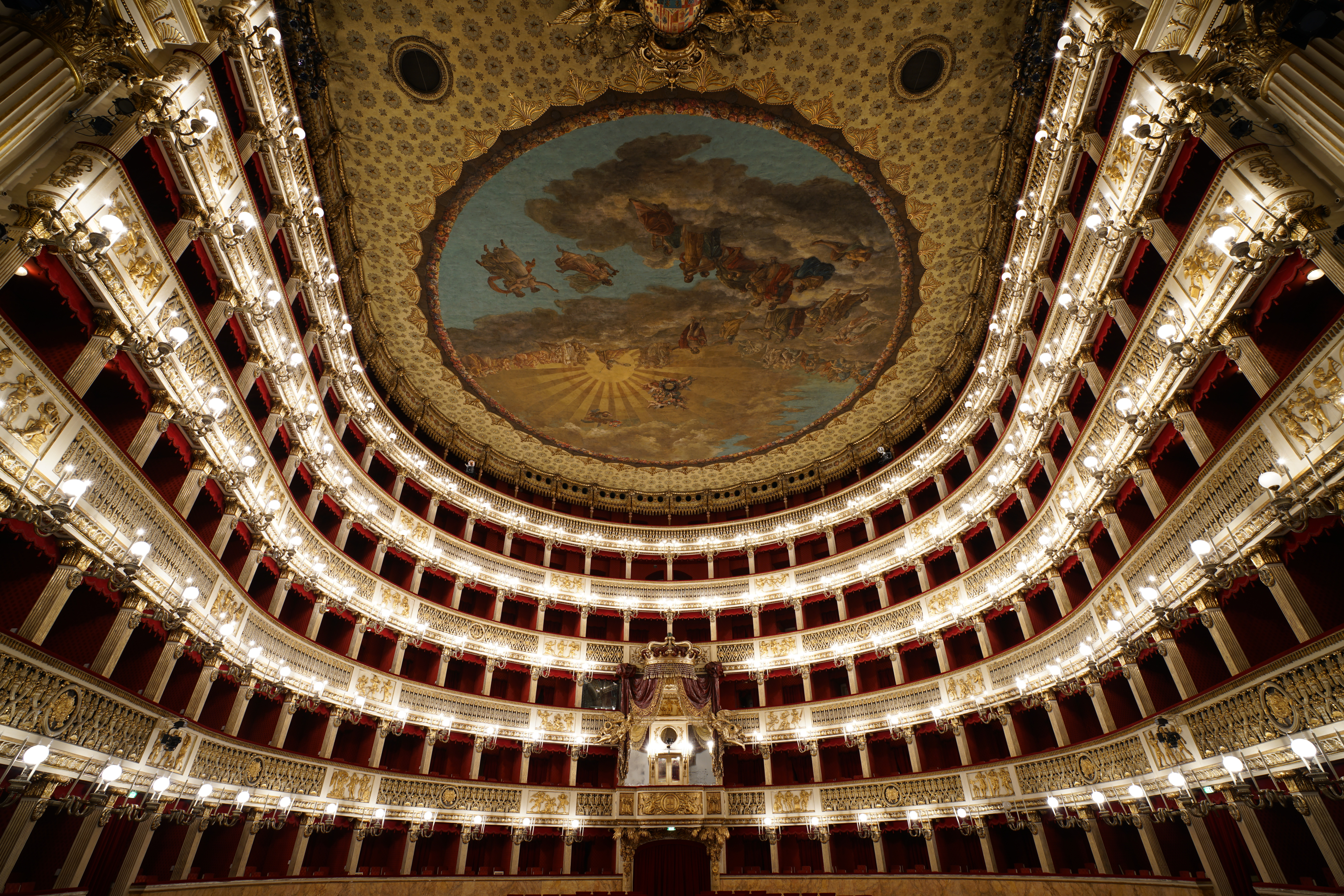
The San Carlo theater in Naples.

In the mid-16th century, the Spanish throne established church-run conservatories in its vice-realm of Naples. These institutions were on the premises of four churches in the city of Naples: Santa Maria di Loreto, Pietà dei Turchini, Sant'Onofrio a Capuana, and I Poveri di Gesù Cristo.

At the time, these institutions were called "conservatories" because they "conserved"—that is, they sheltered and educated—orphans. Since music was such an integral part of the training of the children, by the early 17th century "conservatory" had come to mean "music school" and became used in that meaning in other European languages. On 11 May 1770 and a fourteen-year-old Wolfgang Amadeus Mozart arrived in ancient Suessa and then in Capua to rest in two stages during the journey to Naples. It was in Sessa Aurunca that he also composed a part of Symphony number 11.

The Neapolitan conservatories enjoyed a considerable reputation throughout Europe as training grounds not only for young children to be trained in church music, but, eventually, as a feeder system into the world of commercial music and opera once those areas opened up in the early 17th century. This primed Naples to become one of the most important centers of musical training in Europe.

By the 18th century, Naples was nicknamed the "conservatory of Europe" and was home and workshop to composers such as Alessandro Scarlatti, Pergolesi, Niccolò Piccinni, Domenico Cimarosa, Rossini, Bellini, Donizetti, etc.

Naples was also the birthplace of the popular Neapolitan opera buffa and the site of the San Carlo Theater, built in 1737 and one of the finest musical theaters in the world.

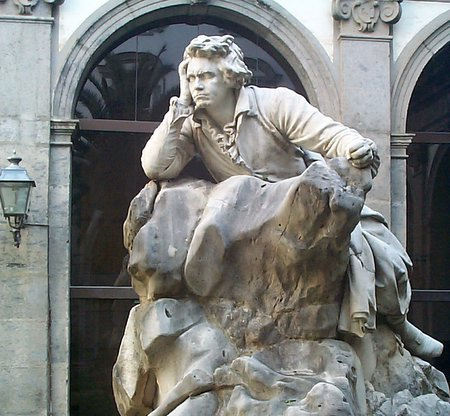
Within the courtyard of San Pietro a Maiella, the Naples Music Conservatory

Under the short French rule of Murat in the early 19th century, the original four conservatories were consolidated into a single institution, which was relocated in 1826 to the premises of the ex-monastery, San Pietro a Maiella.

The conservatory still bears the inscription "Royal Academy of Music" over the entrance and is still an important music school in Italy. It houses an impressive library of manuscripts pertaining to the lives and musical production of the composers who have lived and worked in Naples.

== Canzone Napoletana ==
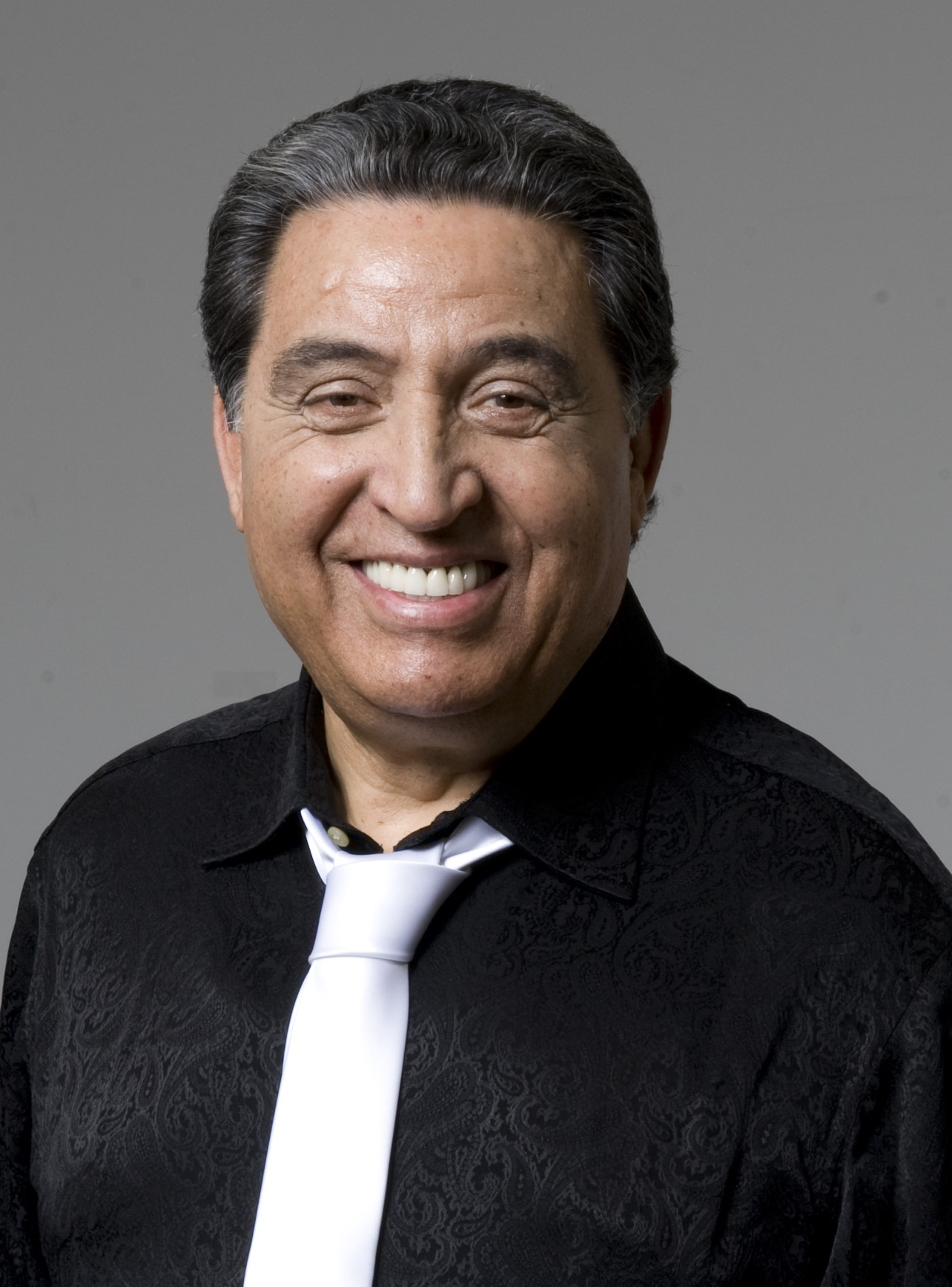
Mario Trevi

Canzone Napoletana is what most people think of when they think of Neapolitan music. It consists of a large body of composed popular music—such songs as 'O sole mio, Torna a Surriento, Funiculì funiculà, etc. The Neapolitan song became a formal institution in the 1830s through the vehicle of an annual song writing competition for the yearly Festival of Piedigrotta, dedicated to the Madonna of Piedigrotta, a well-known church in the Mergellina area of Naples. The winner of the first festival was a song entitled Te voglio bene assaie; it was composed by the prominent opera composer, Gaetano Donizetti. The festival ran regularly until 1950 when it was abandoned. A subsequent Festival of Neapolitan Song on Italian state radio enjoyed some success in the 1950s but was eventually abandoned as well. The period since 1950 has produced such songs as Malafemmena by Totò, Maruzzella by Renato Carosone, Indifferentemente by Mario Trevi and Carmela by Sergio Bruni. Although separated by some decades from the earlier classics of this genre, they have now become "classics" in their own right. (See main article for more information.)

== Neapolitan folk music ==
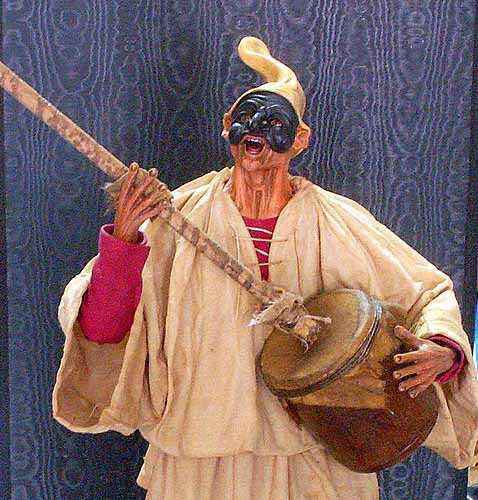
The Neapolitan folk-figure, Pulcinella, playing the putipù.

By definition, this is largely anonymous music. It features traditional folk percussion instruments such as the putipù--consisting of a membrane stretched across a resonating chamber, like a drum. A handle attached to the membrane compresses air rhythmically within the chamber; the air then spurts out of the not-quite-hermetic seal that fastens the membrane to the wooden body of the instrument to produce a "burping" sound;

triccaballacca-—a clapper, consisting of three percussive mallets mounted on a base, the outer two of which are hinged at the base and are moved in to strike the central piece; the rhythmic sound is produced by the clicking of wood on wood and the simultaneous sound of the small metal disks—called "jingles", mounted on the instrument;

the tambourine (called tammorra in Neapolitan dialect)--a circular frame with a single drum head stretched across one side of the instrument. There are generally small metal "jingles" mounted around the perimeter of the instrument, that sound as the tammorra is struck by the knuckles or the open hand.

Often combining dance, music, and drama, the subject matter and approach to vocalizing are quite distinct from the composed stylings of the better-known Neapolitan song.

=== Mandolin ===
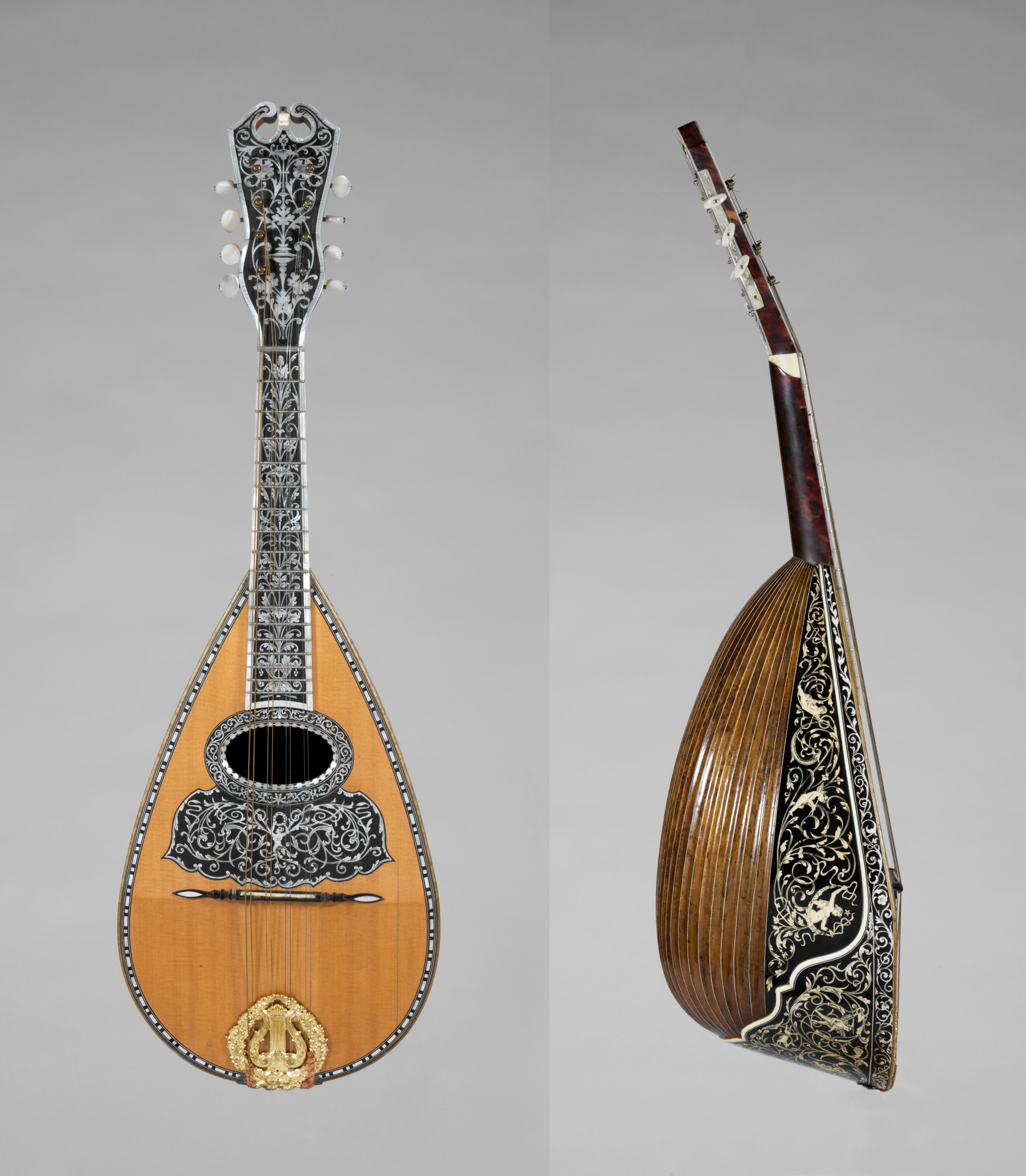
Neapolitan mandolin.

There are various kinds of mandolins in use in Italy; they bear the names of cities or regions such as the "Roman", the "Lombard", the "Genovese", and the "Neapolitan" mandolin. (see also: mandolin). They may differ in size, shape, number of strings and tuning. The traditional Neapolitan mandolin is tear-shaped with a bowl back and a uniquely cut and shaped front (sounding board); it has eight strings paired into the four violin tunings of g, d', a', and e'. The strings are played with a plectrum, producing the rapid and characteristic tremolo sound as the plectrum moves rapidly over unison strings. In that configuration, the Neapolitan mandolin started to be manufactured widely in Naples in the mid-18th century.

In spite of the modern vision of the mandolin as a quaint vehicle for older, traditional popular music such as the Canzone Napoletana, the instrument has a classical history. Students of the mandolin at the Naples Conservatory are required to perform selections from a large repertoire of music composed especially for the instrument by, among others, Vivaldi, Beethoven and Paganini.

Stereotypically, the instrument is commonly used in conjunction with a guitar; the mandolin-guitar duo is the traditional instrumentation for the posteggiatori, the street musicians who wander from restaurant to restaurant and serenade for tips. There is in Naples a mandolin academy that attempts to combat that stereotype by promoting other music, classical and modern, for the instrument

== The Sceneggiata ==
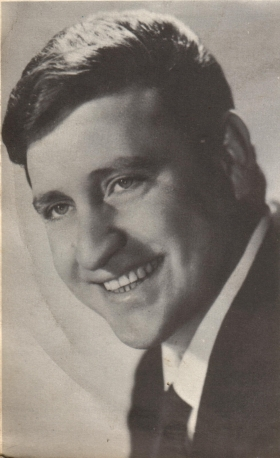
Mario Merola

Little-known abroad, but extremely popular in Naples, is the local stage musical form called the Sceneggiata. Around the start of the 20th century, they were performed in the U.S. in areas populated by Italian immigrants. The form has been called "a musical soap opera" and generally revolves around domestic grief, the agony of leaving home, personal deceit and treachery, betrayal in love, and life in the world of petty crime. It is always sung and spoken in Neapolitan dialect. Action stops every few minutes for someone to break out in song. As a rule, many of the plots were flimsy after-the-fact vehicles to promote particular songs. The sceneggiata started shortly after World War I, was extremely popular in the 1920s, then faded, but has been enjoying somewhat of a comeback with newer generations of performers since the 1960s. The most populars performers of the genre are the Neapolitans, Mario Merola, Pino Mauro and Mario Trevi. The most popular sceneggiata ever written is Zappatore, (meaning, exactly, "clodbuster," one who works the land and breaks up the soil for farming) written to feature a song of that name in 1929 by Bovio and Albano. It then became a stage production and was even made into a film on various occasions, the first one actually from a film company in Little Italy in New York City.

== The Cantautore ==
(Literally, "singer-songwriter".) This music has been extremely popular throughout Italy for decades and its popularity continues to grow. As the name implies, this genre involves songwriters who sing their own music, inevitably songs of social protest or, at least, social relevance. Modern Neapolitan performers include Pino Daniele (probably the best-known Neapolitan cantautore, both in Naples and elsewhere), Edoardo Bennato, Nino D'Angelo, Daniele Sepe, Rita Marcotulli, Nando Citarella and Ciro Ricci. Sepe is quite influential and is known for using protest songs from all over the world and for his skills as a percussionist, flautist and saxophonist. Well-known songs in this genre include Napule è and Terra mia, both by Pino Daniele.

== Globalized music ==
Like all popular music—and even classical music (for example, The Silk Road Ensemble of cellist Yo-Yo Ma)—very recent Neapolitan popular music has incorporated influences from a wide variety of sources, from American jazz and rock to middle-eastern and African music. One example of African influence is the recent CD Oggi o dimane by the well-known Neapolitan singer and actor Massimo Ranieri. Essentially, it is a collection of well-known Neapolitan songs composed in the late 19th and early 20th centuries, such as Marechiaro and Rundinella, backed by north African string and percussion instruments.

Also, the English term "musical" (or, occasionally, the Italian commedia musicale—a translation of "musical comedy") has come to be used over the last few decades in Italy, in general, and Naples, in particular, to describe a kind of musical drama not native to Italy, a form that employs the American idiom of jazz-pop-and rock-based music and rhythms to move a story along in a combination of songs and dialogue. Obviously, the term is used to refer to original American musicals, but now is used, as well, for original productions in Italian and Neapolitan dialect. The first Italian "musical" was Carosello Napoletano, first a stage production and then a 1953 film directed by Ettore Giannini and featuring a young Sophia Loren in the cast. More recent Neapolitan musicals have been C'era una volta...Scugnizzi, based on the lives of Neapolitan street kids ("Scugnizzi) and Napoli 1799, about the republican revolution of 1799 that briefly overthrew the Bourbon monarchy.

== Venues ==
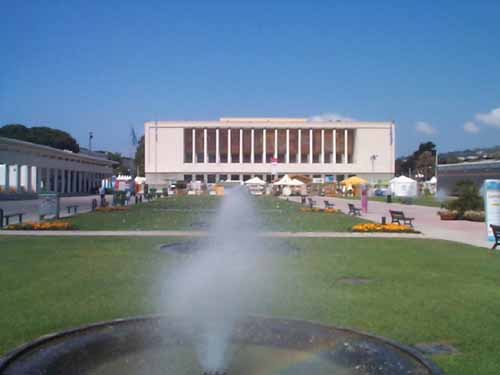
The Teatro Mediterraneo at the Overseas Fair Grounds.

The most famous place, of course, to hear music in Naples is the San Carlo opera house. Lesser-known is the smaller theater in the adjacent Royal Palace, a stage often used by the Neapolitan ballet company. Besides being the home of the opera, San Carlo is the most frequent venue several times a year for large visiting orchestras. The nearby Teatro Mercadante, a charming old theater from the late 1790s—and along with San Carlo one of the official royal theaters of the day—has reopened after many decades of sporadic use.

With the resurrection of the mammoth overseas fair grounds, the Mostra d'Oltremare (originally built in the 1930s) in the nearby community of Fuorigrotta, the Teatro Mediterraneo on those premises is now, as well, a frequent stage for all types of musical performances. The fair grounds site has the added advantage of containing, as well, the newly reopened outdoor amphitheater, the arena. It hosts summer performances of various kinds, including, most prominently, grand opera such as Verdi's Aida.

There is a large program of chamber music in Naples, hosted by the Alessandro Scarlatti Association, usually staged in the Teatro delle Palme off of Via dei Mille in the Chaia section of Naples. As well, smaller groups and musical productions avail themselves of a half-dozen or so theaters around town that also double as cinemas.

Additionally, the Naples music conservatory has recently refurbished and opened an auditorium on the premises and puts on regularly scheduled concerts of various kinds of music, often featuring conservatory students and faculty.

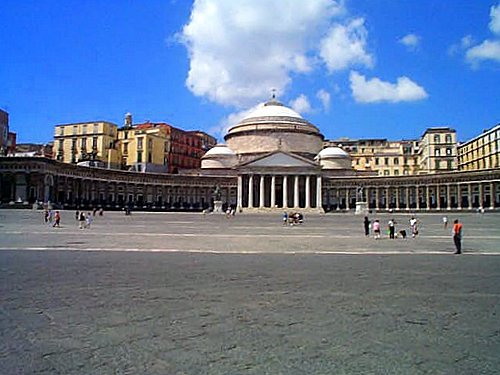
Piazza del Plebiscito in Naples

The largest public venue for music, parades, political rallies, installation art, New Year's celebrations, etc. is Piazza Plebiscito, the spacious open square on the west side of the Royal Palace. Other outdoor venues include the Communal Gardens, a half-mile long park along the sea-side.

Also, after decades of neglect, the Trianon theater has now reopened as a theater of Neapolitan Song. It has an impressive program of traditional Neapolitan plays and musicals, an art gallery, very good acoustics, and will soon have a permanent multimedia exhibit dedicated to Enrico Caruso. The theater is located, appropriately, in a traditional part of town, Piazza Calenda, at the extreme eastern edge of the old historic center of Naples.

== See also ==
- Music of Campania

== Bibliografia ==
- Marcello Sorce Keller, "Io te voglio bene assaje: a Famous Neapolitan Song Traditionally Attributed to Gaetano Donizetti", The Music Review, XLV (1984), no. 3- 4, 251- 264.
- Marcello Sorce Keller, “Continuing Opera with Other Means: Opera, Neapolitan song, and popular music among Italian immigrants overseas”, Forum Italicum, Vol. XLIX(2015), No 3, 1- 20.
