= Sceneggiata =

Form of musical drama typical of Naples

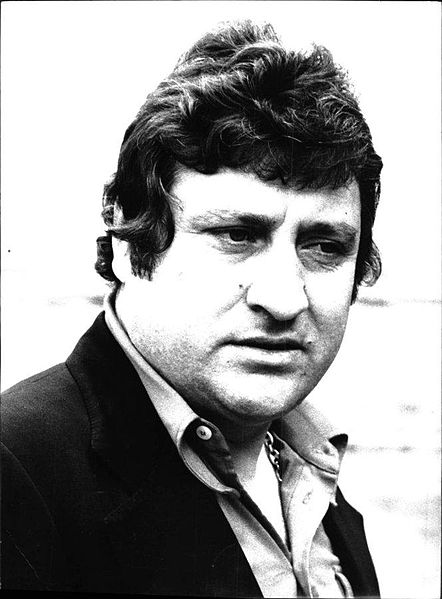
Mario Merola, the "king of sceneggiata"

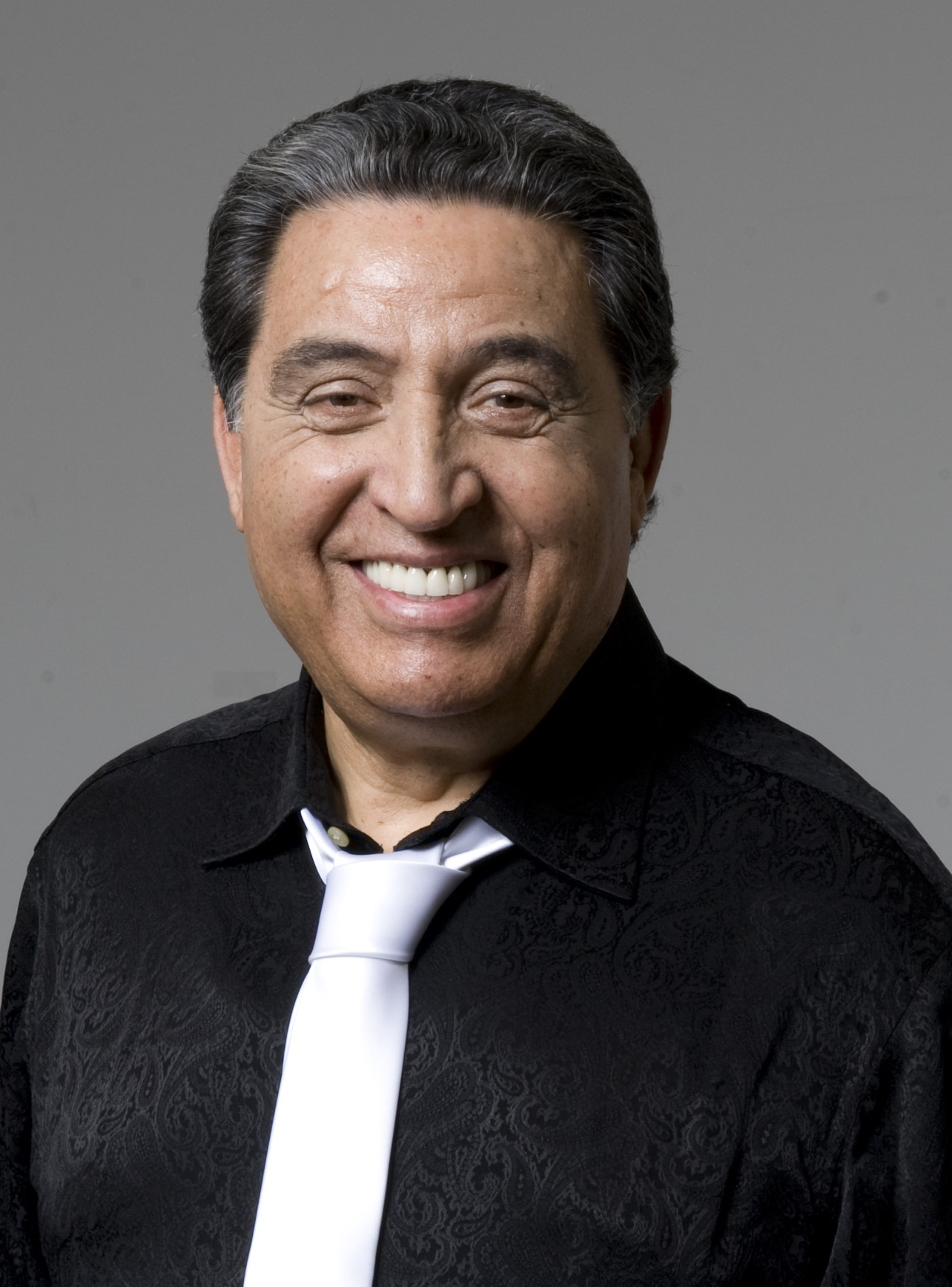
Mario Trevi

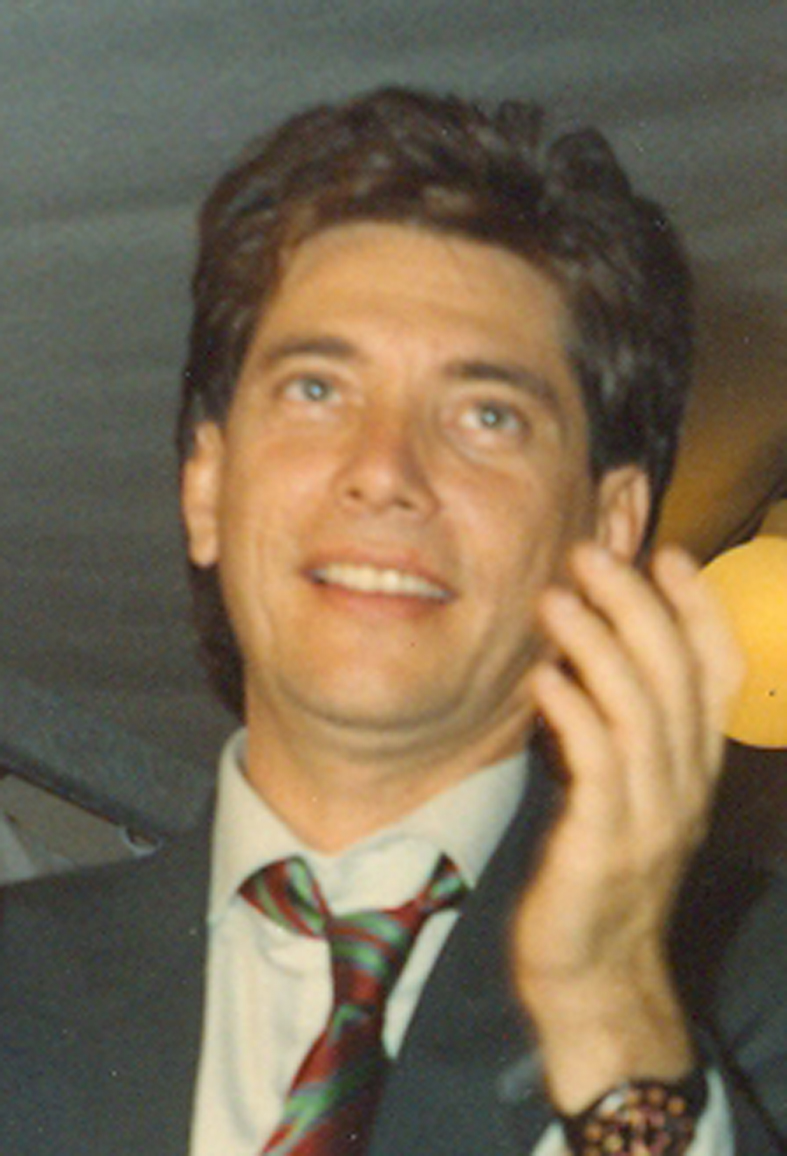
Nino D'Angelo

The sceneggiata (pronounced [ʃenedˈdʒaːta], pl. sceneggiate) or sceneggiata napoletana (pronounced [ʃenedˈdʒaːata napoleˈtaːna]) is a form of musical drama typical of Naples. Beginning as a form of musical theatre after World War I, it was also adapted for cinema; sceneggiata films became especially popular in the 1970s, and contributed to the genre becoming more widely known outside Naples. The most famous actors who played dramas were Mario Merola, Mario Trevi, and Nino D'Angelo.

The sceneggiata can be roughly described as a "musical soap opera", where action and dialogue are interspersed with Neapolitan songs. Plots revolve around melodramatic themes drawing from the Neapolitan culture and tradition, including passion, jealousy, betrayal, personal deceit and treachery, honor, vengeance, and life in the world of petty crime. Songs and dialogue were originally in Neapolitan dialect, although, especially in filmic production, Italian has sometimes been preferred, to reach a larger audience. Outside Italy, sceneggiata is mostly known in areas populated by Italian immigrants. Besides Naples, the second homeland of sceneggiata is probably Little Italy in New York City.

== History and evolution ==
=== The golden age: 1920–1940 ===
The sceneggiata has its roots in cheap, popular theatrical performances, and scholars believe that economic considerations were decisive in its development. This is also true of the genre's most commonly identified forerunners, such as the works of Pasquale Altavilla (1806–1875), who developed many of his comedies around successful songs to appeal to a larger audience. After World War I, the Italian government increased the taxation of variety shows, thus causing many authors to devise a mixed type of show that would complement songs with dramatic acting, in order to circumvent such duties. This escamotage is sometimes credited to Enzo Lucio Murolo, who explicitly wrote the song "Surriento gentile" with the intent to create a sceneggiata around it and bring it to theatres in that form (the sceneggiata was performed by the Cafiero-Fumo company in 1920).

One of the first known examples of sceneggiata is Pupatella (1918), based on the eponymous song by Libero Bovio, and performed by the theatre company led by Giovanni D'Alessio. In the following years the sceneggiata quickly developed with the advent of dedicated companies, such as that founded by Salvatore Cafiero (formerly a variety show author) and Eugenio Fumo (formerly a popular dramatist), and dedicated venues, such as the Trianon and San Ferdinando theatres, that became "temples" of the genre. The Cafiero-Fumo company (which starred, among others, Nino Taranto) largely contributed to establishing the genre's parameters. The typical sceneggiata included monologues, dialogues, songs, dancing, and its plot was centered on strong emotions such as love, passion, jealousy, honor, betrayal, adultery, vengeance, and the fight between good and evil. A standard pattern was that of the "triangle" comprising isso ("he", the hero), essa ("she", the heroine) and 'o malamente ("the villain").

Sceneggiata remained extremely popular in Naples from the 1920s throughout to the 1940s. This era was dominated by a relatively small number of authors, called poeti di compagnia ("company poets") who wrote most of the screenplays; those included Enzo Lucio Murolo (1898–1975), Oscar Di Maio, Gaspare di Maio (1872–1930), and Raffaele Chiurazzi.

In this golden era of the sceneggiata, the genre was also exported abroad, especially in communities of Italian immigrants of Neapolitan origin. New York City's Little Italy, most nostably, became a sort of second homeland of the sceneggiata, with notable companies such as Maggio-Coruzzolo-Ciaramella, Marchetello-Diaz, and that led by Gilda Mignonette (1890–1953), the so-called "Queen of Emigrants".

Besides being performed in theatres, sceneggiate were adapted for film since the early years of cinematography. The prominent sceneggiata movie studio was Miramare Film, founded by Emanuele Rotonno, that between 1919 and 1927 produced over 100 largely successful movies. This era of sceneggiata films, by the way, established a tradition of movies based on hit songs, which remained in Italian film making long after the decline of sceneggiata itself. One of the best known developments of this tradition is the musicarello subgenre that became popular in the 1950s–1960s in Italy, whereby many popular singer and singer-songwriters (e.g., Gianni Morandi, Al Bano, Adriano Celentano, Little Tony, and others) would also be actors in movies linked to their major hits.

=== Revival: 1970–1990 ===
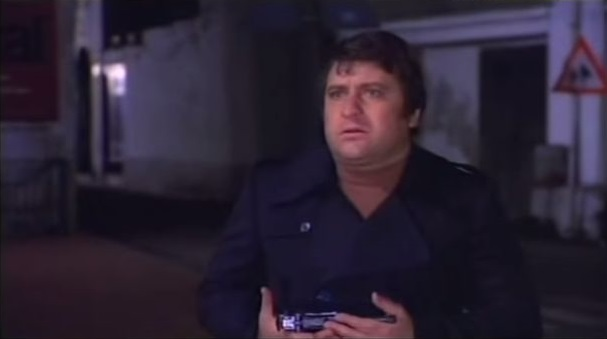
Mario Merola in Sgarro alla camorra by Ettore Maria Fizzarotti (1973)

The sceneggiata almost disappeared across World War II. In 1969, a single theatre in Naples (the Teatro Duemila) was continuing this tradition.

Nevertheless, in the 1970s the genre had a new boost. While this revival was mostly driven by successful sceneggiata films starring popular singers/actors such as Mario Merola, Mario Trevi, and Nino D'Angelo, sceneggiata also reappeared in theatres. Merola, in particular, became so popular with movies such as Sgarro alla camorra or Zappatore (the most successful sceneggiata film ever) to earn the title of "king of sceneggiata". Especially outside Naples, Merola is by far the best known representative of the sceneggiata genre and he is often mentioned to refer to sceneggiata through antonomasia.

Sgarro alla camorra (i.e. "Offence to the Camorra", 1973), in particular, written and directed by Ettore Maria Fizzarotti and starring Mario Merola at his film debut, is regarded as the first sceneggiata film and as a prototype for the genre. It was shot in Cetara, province of Salerno.

The revival era of sceneggiata, too, had its "company poets", who worked either for theatres, films, or both. Prominent representatives of this generation of sceneggiata authors include Alberto Sciotti (1925–1998), Aniello Langella (1919–1995), Francesco Martinelli, Elena Cannio, and Gaetano Di Maio (1927–1991).

== Canons of sceneggiata ==
The canons within which the themes brought to the stage by the authors of the Neapolitan sceneggiate are well defined, such as love, betrayal, honor - sometimes the underworld -, summarized in the trinomial of protagonists:

- isso ("he"), also called "tenor", the positive hero;
- essa ("she"), also called "first female singer", the heroine;
- 'o malamente (the villain), the antagonist.

== In popular culture ==
- A scene from Senza Mamma, a sceneggiata written by Francis Ford Coppola's grandfather Francesco Pennino, is featured in Coppola's The Godfather Part II.
- The Italian pornographic film director Mario Salieri released his Sceneggiata napoletana, in which sexual activity with background music takes over the role of the form's usual musical interludes.
