= List of Italian films of 1981 =

A list of films produced in Italy in 1981 (see 1981 in film):

Title	Director	Cast	Genre	Notes
1981
L'assistente sociale tutto pepe	Nando Cicero	Nadia Cassini, Renzo Montagnani, Irene Papas	Commedia sexy all'italiana	
Asso	Castellano & Pipolo	Adriano Celentano, Edwige Fenech, Renato Salvatori, Sylva Koscina	Comedy	Also known under title "Ace"
The Beyond	Lucio Fulci	Katherine MacColl	Horror	
Bianco, rosso e Verdone	Carlo Verdone	Carlo Verdone, Elena Fabrizi, Milena Vukotic, Mario Brega	Comedy	Produced by Sergio Leone and music by Ennio Morricone
The Black Cat	Lucio Fulci	Patrick Magee, Mimsy Farmer	Horror	
Bollenti spiriti	Giorgio Capitani	Johnny Dorelli, Gloria Guida	Comedy	
Burial Ground: The Nights of Terror	Andrea Bianchi	Karin Well, Mariangela Giordano	Horror	
C'è un fantasma nel mio letto	Claudio Giorgi	Lilli Carati, Renzo Montagnani, Vincenzo Crocitti	—N/a	Italian-Spanish co-production
Camera d'albergo	Mario Monicelli	Vittorio Gassman, Monica Vitti, Enrico Montesano	Comedy	David di Donatello for Best Editing
Cannibal Ferox	Umberto Lenzi	Robert Kerman	horror	
Carcerato	Alfonso Brescia	Mario Merola, Regina Bianchi	drama	
Car Crash	Antonio Margheriti	Joey Travolta, Vittorio Mezzogiorno	Action	
Cornetti alla crema	Sergio Martino	Lino Banfi, Edwige Fenech	Commedia sexy all'italiana	
Culo e camicia	Pasquale Festa Campanile	Enrico Montesano, Renato Pozzetto	Comedy	
Delitto al ristorante cinese	Bruno Corbucci	Tomas Milian, Bombolo	Crime-comedy	
La disubbidienza	Pasquale Festa Campanile	Stefania Sandrelli, Teresa Ann Savoy, Mario Adorf	romance-drama	
Don't Look in the Attic	Carlo Ausino	Beba Lončar, Jean-Pierre Aumont, Annarita Grapputo	Horror	
La dottoressa preferisce i marinai	Michele Massimo Tarantini	Paola Senatore, Alvaro Vitali, Marisa Mell	Commedia sexy all'italiana	
Escape from Galaxy 3	Bitto Albertini	Don Powell	science fiction	
Fantasma d'amore	Dino Risi	Romy Schneider, Marcello Mastroianni	—N/a	Italian-West German-French co-productions
Il ficcanaso	Bruno Corbucci	Pippo Franco, Edwige Fenech	giallo-comedy	
I fichissimi	Carlo Vanzina	Diego Abatantuono, Jerry Calà	Comedy	
Forest of Love	Alberto Bevilacqua	Monica Guerritore, William Berger	drama	
Fracchia la belva umana	Neri Parenti	Paolo Villaggio, Lino Banfi	Comedy	
La gatta da pelare	Pippo Franco	Pippo Franco, Janet Agren	Comedy	
Great White	Enzo G. Castellari	James Franciscus, Vic Morrow	adventure	
Help Me Dream	Pupi Avati	Mariangela Melato, Anthony Franciosa	romance	
The House by the Cemetery	Lucio Fulci	Katherine MacColl	Horror	
The Lady of the Camellias	Mauro Bolognini	Isabelle Huppert, Gian Maria Volonté	drama	
Madly in Love	Castellano & Pipolo	Adriano Celentano, Ornella Muti, Adolfo Celi	Comedy	
The Mafia Triangle	Alfonso Brescia	Mario Merola, Howard Ross	Crime	
Manolesta	Pasquale Festa Campanile	Tomás Milián, Giovanna Ralli	Comedy	
Il Marchese del Grillo	Mario Monicelli	Alberto Sordi, Paolo Stoppa	Historical Comedy	Best director Berlin Film Festival, 4 Nastro d'Argento, 2 David di Donatello
Mia moglie torna a scuola	Giuliano Carnimeo	Carmen Russo, Renzo Montagnani	Commedia sexy all'italiana	
Miele di donna	Gianfranco Angelucci	Clio Goldsmith, Catherine Spaak, Fernando Rey	Drama	
Il minestrone	Sergio Citti	Roberto Benigni, Ninetto Davoli, Franco Citti	comedy	Entered into the 31st Berlin International Film Festival
Murder Obsession	Riccardo Freda	Martine Brochard, Henri Garcin, John Richardson, Laura Gemser	—N/a	Italian-French co-production
My Darling, My Dearest	Sergio Corbucci	Giancarlo Giannini, Mariangela Melato, Stefania Sandrelli	Comedy	
Nessuno è perfetto	Pasquale Festa Campanile	Enrico Montesano, Renato Pozzetto, Ornella Muti	Comedy	
Nudo di donna	Nino Manfredi	Nino Manfredi, Eleonora Giorgi	mystery-comedy	
Le occasioni di Rosa	Salvatore Piscicelli	Marina Suma	drama	
Odd Squad	Enzo Barboni	Johnny Dorelli, Giuliano Gemma, Vincent Gardenia	war-comedy	
L'onorevole con l'amante sotto il letto	Mariano Laurenti	Lino Banfi, Janet Agren, Alvaro Vitali	Commedia sexy all'italiana	
The Other Hell	Bruno Mattei, Claudio Fragasso	Carlo De Mejo	Horror	
Passion of Love	Ettore Scola	Bernard Giraudeau, Laura Antonelli	drama	Entered into the 1981 Cannes Film Festival
The Skin	Liliana Cavani	Marcello Mastroianni, Burt Lancaster, Claudia Cardinale, Ken Marshall	War drama	Based on Curzio Malaparte's novel The Skin, entered into the 1981 Cannes Film Festival
Pierino contro tutti	Marino Girolami	Alvaro Vitali, Michela Miti	Comedy	
Pierino medico della Saub	Giuliano Carnimeo	Alvaro Vitali, Mario Carotenuto	Comedy	
Piso pisello	Peter Del Monte	Alessandro Haber	Comedy-drama	
A Policewoman in New York	Michele Massimo Tarantini	Edwige Fenech, Alvaro Vitali, Aldo Maccione	Commedia sexy all'italiana	
Porno Holocaust	Joe D'Amato	George Eastman	Pornographic-horror	
Quando la coppia scoppia	Steno	Enrico Montesano, Claude Brasseur, Dalila Di Lazzaro	Comedy	
Ricomincio da tre	Massimo Troisi	Massimo Troisi, Lello Arena	Comedy	
Sogni d'oro	Nanni Moretti	Nanni Moretti, Laura Morante, Alessandro Haber	Comedy	Special Jury Prize at the Venice Film Festival
Spaghetti a mezzanotte	Sergio Martino	Lino Banfi, Barbara Bouchet	Comedy	
Tales of Ordinary Madness (Storie di ordinaria follia)	Marco Ferreri	Ben Gazzara, Ornella Muti, Susan Tyrrell	Drama	4 David di Donatello. 2 Nastro d'Argento
Il tango della gelosia	Steno	Monica Vitti, Diego Abatantuono	comedy	
Tre fratelli (Three Brothers)	Francesco Rosi	Vittorio Mezzogiorno, Philippe Noiret, Michele Placido, Andréa Ferréol, Charles Vanel	Drama	4 David di Donatello. Academy Award nominee. 3 Nastro d'Argento
Il turno	Tonino Cervi	Vittorio Gassman, Laura Antonelli, Paolo Villaggio	Comedy	
La tragedia di un uomo ridicolo	Bernardo Bertolucci	Ugo Tognazzi, Anouk Aimée, Laura Morante, Ricky Tognazzi, Renato Salvatori	Drama	Cannes Award & Nastro d'Argento for best actor (Tognazzi)
L'ultimo harem	Sergio Garrone	George Lazenby, Corinne Cléry, Aldo Sambrell	erotic drama	
Una vacanza del cactus	Mariano Laurenti	Annamaria Rizzoli, Enzo Cannavale, Bombolo	Commedia sexy all'italiana	
Uno contro l'altro, praticamente amici	Bruno Corbucci	Renato Pozzetto, Tomas Milian, Anna Maria Rizzoli	Comedy	
Who Finds a Friend Finds a Treasure	Sergio Corbucci	Terence Hill, Bud Spencer	adventure-comedy	
