= Sgarro alla camorra =

1973 film by Ettore Maria Fizzarotti

- Directed by: Ettore Maria Fizzarotti
- Written by: Ettore Maria Fizzarotti; Alfredo Melidoni; Vincenzo Grano
- Produced by: Alfredo Melidoni
- Starring: Mario Merola
- Cinematography: Alberto Spagnoli
- Edited by: Raimondo Crociani
- Music by: Antonio Esposito
- Release date: 1973
- Language: Italian

Sgarro alla camorra (i.e. "Offence to the Camorra") is a 1973 Italian musical-crime film written and directed by Ettore Maria Fizzarotti and starring Mario Merola at his film debut. It is regarded as the first sceneggiata film and as a prototype for the genre. It was shot in Cetara, Province of Salerno.

== Cast ==
- Mario Merola as Andrea Staiano
- Franco Acampora as Pietro Morra
- Dada Gallotti as Angela
- Enzo Cannavale as Vicienzo "Papele"
- Pietro De Vico as Gnasso
- Dolores Palumbo as Pietro's Mother
- Aldo Bufi Landi as Scicco
- Giuseppe Anatrelli as Don Enrico Cecere
- Silvia Dionisio as Gisella Gargiulo
- Saro Urzì as The “Great Uncle”
- Renzo Pevarello as Don Alfonso
