= Carcerato (1981 film) =

- Directed by: Alfonso Brescia
- Written by: Piero Regnoli; Francesco Calabrese; Alfonso Brescia
- Starring: Mario Merola; Regina Bianchi
- Cinematography: Silvio Fraschetti
- Music by: Eduardo Alfieri
- Release date: 1981
- Language: Italian

Carcerato (i.e. "Inmate") is a 1981 Italian melodrama film written and directed by Alfonso Brescia and starring Mario Merola.

== Plot ==
Francesco Improta is an honest fruit and vegetable peddler who lives with his elderly mother Assunta and daughter Fiorella. His wife Lucia left home two years earlier, as, in order to help the family, she did not hesitate to give herself to the boss Peppino Ascalone, with whom she is now forced to live together. Francesco decides to welcome his wife back to get her away from her lover: he telephones her, but the communication is interrupted by Peppino, who is accused by Lucia of the disdain for the state she is in because of him. In response, Ascalone slaps her, causing her to escape, before receiving a visit from another boss, Nicola Esposito, who colds him with three gunshots and then runs away. Just at that moment Francesco enters the villa, being therefore mistakenly found guilty of the murder of Ascalone: the man is sentenced to fifteen years.

Locked up in prison, Francesco suffers the harassment of the head of the prison guards, but at the same time receives the solidarity of his cellmates, as well as Pasqualino and Ciccio, two clumsy criminals from his neighborhood. After some time, Francesco receives a visit from Assunta, increasingly weakened: his mother reveals to him the hopes of an acquittal on appeal, but also reminds him that Fiorella's first communion, scheduled for Easter, is just around the corner. Before being arrested, in fact, Francis promised his daughter to sing the Ave Maria to her in the church during the ceremony.

A few days later, Nicola Esposito got himself translated in Procida. The boss, respected and feared even by the guards themselves, knows of Francesco's alleged guilt of the murder he himself committed, and tries to make friends with him, receiving a disrespectful welcome. Five days before Easter, anxious for his daughter's imminent First Communion, Francis strongly protests with the guards, asking to go out. Esposito decides to exploit the circumstance to implement his plan: to kill Francesco, in order to wash off the offense. The boss convinces him to flee on Easter Eve: but Francesco is warned of the trap, and when he is on the threshold, he forces Esposito to go out first: the man, mistaken by the guards for Francesco, is riddled and reduced to death by the guards. Francesco manages to escape, but is recognized and wounded in the shoulder.

Back on the mainland, Francesco finds Assunta sick in bed, telling her that he has been freed. Saved her mother just in time and despite being bleeding, she manages to go to church and fulfill Fiorella's wish, singing her the Ave Maria. Lucia was also present at the ceremony, begging the Madonna for the grace of being able to return with her family. Having recognized his good faith, Francesco decides to forgive his wife, and together the two embrace his daughter again. At the exit from the church there is the police commissioner. Francesco believes he has to go back to jail, but the manager has come to reveal his innocence to him: on the verge of death Esposito confessed to Pasqualino and Ciccio that he had killed Ascalone. The Improta family can thus happily reunite.

== Cast ==
- Mario Merola as Francesco Improta
- Regina Bianchi as Donna Assunta, Francesco's Mother
- Biagio Pelligra as Nicola Esposito
- Erika Blanc as Lucia, Francesco's Wife
- Marta Zoffoli as Fiorella, Francesco's Daughter
- Aldo Giuffrè as Peppino Ascalone
- Antonio Allocca as Pasqualino
- Lucio Montanaro as Ciccio
- Nino Vingelli as The Professor
- Giorgio Ardisson as The Commissioner
- Sergio Castellitto as Scapricciatiello
- Michele Esposito as Gennarino
- Pamela Paris as Donna Maria
- Lucio Rosato as Brigadiere

== See also ==
- List of Italian films of 1981
