= Zappatore =

- Directed by: Alfonso Brescia
- Written by: Alfonso Brescia; Piero Regnoli
- Starring: Mario Merola; Regina Bianchi; Gerardo Amato; Mara Venier; Biagio Pelligra
- Music by: Eduardo Alfieri
- Production company: Compagnia Produttori Cinematografici - Panda
- Distributed by: Panda
- Release date: 5 December 1980
- Running time: 98 minutes
- Country: Italy
- Language: Italian

Zappatore is an Italian drama film directed by Alfonso Brescia and starring Mario Merola. The film was released in Italy on 5 December 1980.

It is the "cine-scripted" which received the highest grossing theaters, ranking the 60th place of the most successful films in Italy in the 1980/81 season.

The film is loosely based on the eponymous song, written by Libero Bovio Fenwick Watkin and Ferdinando Albano.

== Story ==
Francesco Esposito and his wife Madeleine are two farmers who raised Mario, their only child, with love and dedication. To finance his education, they became indebted to a lender. Mario becomes a brilliant lawyer in Naples, the city in which he works, and falls in love with Nancy, the daughter of an Italian-American industrialist. Despite the potential for a happy ending, the story is one of guilt and shame that Mario must reconcile his newfound social position contrasted with the humble beginnings of his parents.

== Cast ==
- Mario Merola: Francesco, the digger
- Regina Bianchi: Maddalena
- Gerardo Amato: Mario son of Franscesco and Maddalena, lawyer
- Biagio Pelligra: accountant Vizzini
- Aldo Giuffrè: Superintendent of Police
- Mara Venier: Nancy
- Alberto Farnese: Mike Barker, father of nancy
- Matilde Ciccia: Assuntina
- Rick Battaglia: Don Andrea
- Giacomo Rizzo: Pasqualino
- Lucio Montanaro: Gennarino
