= From Corleone to Brooklyn =

- Original Italian film poster
- Italian: Da Corleone a Brooklyn
- Directed by: Umberto Lenzi
- Screenplay by: Umberto Lenzi; Vincenzo Mannino
- Story by: Umberto Lenzi
- Produced by: Sandra Infascelli
- Starring: Maurizio Merli; Mario Merola; Van Johnson
- Cinematography: Guglielmo Mancori
- Edited by: Eugenio Alabiso
- Music by: Franco Micalizzi
- Production company: Primex Italiana
- Distributed by: Variety Distribution
- Release date: 13 April 1979 (Italy)
- Running time: 95 minutes
- Country: Italy
- Box office: ₤398.6 million

From Corleone to Brooklyn (Italian: Da Corleone a Brooklyn) is a 1979 Italian poliziottesco film directed and co-written by Umberto Lenzi, and starring Maurizio Merli, Mario Merola, Van Johnson, Biagio Pelligra, Venantino Venantini and Laura Belli. It was released in Italy by Variety Distribution on 13 April 1979.

== Plot ==
Italian police officer Giorgio Berni is seeking to arrest Sicilian mobster Michele Barresi, who is hiding in New York City under the name Vito Ferrando, for his role in the murder of Francesco Santoro. He plans to accomplish this by having a witness to the murder, Salvetore Scalia, testify against Barresi in court as evidence that Barresi was involved in the crime. On their way from Italy to New York. Berni and Scalia experience several lethal encounters with Barresi's men trying to prevent them from getting to Barresi.

Assuming that Salvetore Scalia is dead, as a result of a newspaper report put out by the police, Barresi has his sister Liana murdered so as to eliminate all witnesses to the murder of Santoro. While searching Liana's apartment, police find a plane ticket for New York. While leaving Liana's apartment a shootout breaks out between Barresi's men and Berni, resulting in the death of Giuseppe Caruso, and revealing that Salvetore Scalia is alive. In order to secure a safe hiding spot for Scalia, Berni takes him to the house of his ex-wife, Paola. After leaving Paola's house another firefight ensues with Barresi's men. Paola, Berni, and Scalia then stay in a hotel for the night. As they head to the airport the following day, the road is blocked by Barresi's men, where Berni commands Paola to speed through their barrier. From here, Berni and Scalia take a plane to New York.

According to plan Scalia and Berni take refuge in a hotel the evening before they plan to testify against Barresi. After realizing that the man guarding the door is missing, Berni must take Scalia somewhere else to hide. He takes him to Joe's Restaurant and Pizzeria, where the head of the restaurant, Luigi, allows them to hide in his apartment upstairs. Meanwhile, two of Barresi's men enter the restaurant aiming to murder Berni and Scalia. However, a group of robbers enter immediately after, prompting Barresi's men to engage in shootout with the robbers, then flee the scene. Berni and Scalia exit Joe's Restaurant to track down the two men who left the restaurant, but are instead ambushed by a street gang. Police arrive to the scene of the ambush, where they arrest Berni and Scalia after receiving a report of two dangerous men, one armed, in the area. They do not initially believe that Berni is an Italian police officer. After Berni convinces them to take him to Lieutenant Sturges, who is sitting on the court case of Barresi, Berni and Scalia are free to begin their testimony against Barresi. When Scalia takes the stand to testify against Barresi, however, he claims that he does not know the man and has never seen him in his life, causing the judge to order Barresi to be set free.

Outside the court house, Scalia is shot dead by a gunman on the roof, revealed to be a clerk working at the hotel in which Berni and Scalia stayed when they first arrived in New York. The film ends with Berni searching Scalia's jacket pockets and finding a note stating that, if he were to die, let it be known that the man who goes by Vito Ferrando is actually Michele Barresi, providing Berni with the evidence he needs to bring Barresi down. Scalia arrests Barresi and says he's bringing him to Italy to stand trial. A defiant Barresi tells Scalia that he doubts whether they'll make it back there.

== Cast ==
- Maurizio Merli as Lt. Giorgio Berni
- Mario Merola as Michele Barresi / 'Vito Ferrando'
- Van Johnson as Lt. Sturges
- Biagio Pelligra as Salvatore Scalia
- Venantino Venantini as Lt. Danova
- Laura Belli as Paola
- Sonia Viviani as Liana Scalia
- Nando Marineo as LoCascio
- Salvatore Billa as Giuseppe Caruso
- Massimo Sarchielli as Esposito

Uncredited

- Luca Barbareschi as NYPD Officer
- Pete Hamill as Man in Restaurant
- Tom Felleghy as Police Official

== Release ==
From Corleone to Brooklyn was released theatrically in Italy on 13 April 1979, distributed by Variety. The film grossed 398.6 million Italian lira.

== See also ==
- List of Italian films of 1979
