= Mario Trevi =

Italian singer

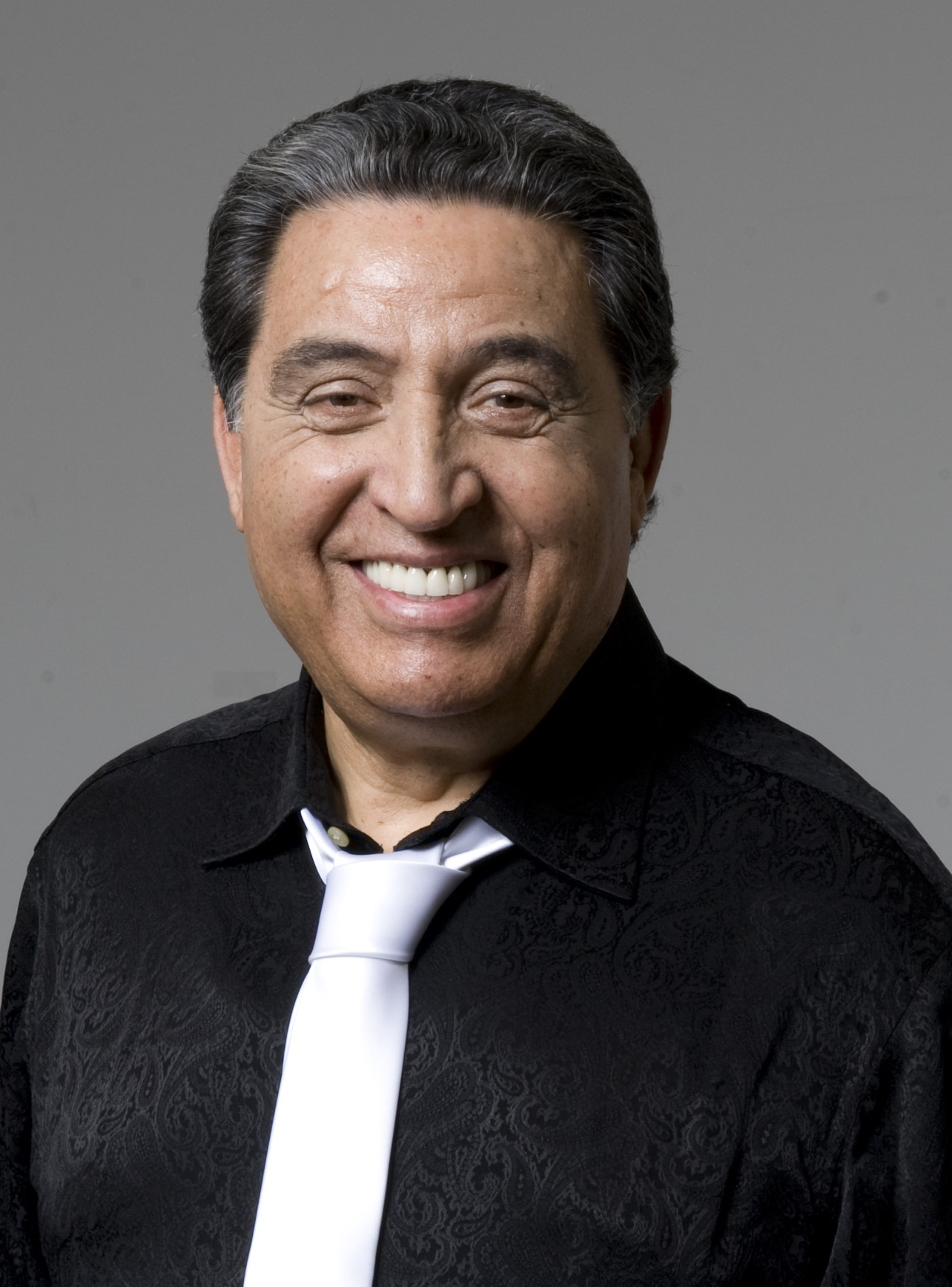

Background information
- Born: Agostino Capozzi; 2 November 1941 (age 84); Melito di Napoli, Metropolitan City of Naples, Kingdom of Italy
- Origin: Naples, Italy
- Genres: Pop; canzone napoletana; turbo-folk
- Occupations: Singer; actor
- Years active: 1955–present
- Labels: Durium; Royal; RCA; King Universal; Zeus Record
- Website: mariotrevi.com

Agostino Capozzi (born 2 November 1941), known professionally as Mario Trevi, is an Italian singer and actor.

== Biography ==
Trevi was born in Melito di Napoli, Metropolitan City of Naples, on 2 November 1941. He is the son of Domenico and Maddalena Capozzi Ciletti and the first of nine children. Mario is the head of a family set in the melodic song in the heart of Naples, Italy. He is the brother of Lino Capozzi, Stefano Fany, and Franco Moreno. He is also the uncle of Salvatore Capozzi and Mimmo Moreno and grandfather of Tony Mariano. Mario Trevi spent his childhood in poverty during Italy's post-war. At a young age he began working as a bricklayer, and some evenings he sang for free in the basement of a local puppet theatre where he entratained small audiences. Agostino, in art known as Mario Trevi, soon changed job from a bricklayer to a fabric cutter in a fabric shop at Piazza Nicola Amore in Naples, but did not give up singing. Instead his passion for singing grew, and he soon became a fan of Sergio Bruni, a well-known Neapolitan singer. At the age 14, he took on singing lessons with Maestro Attilio Staffelli, a professor at the Conservatory of San Pietro a Majella. Soon, Mario's voice was heard in one of Galleria Umberto I, thanks to one of his uncles. At that event, Vincenzo Acampora noticed Mario's talent and proposed him to sing at the Piedigrotta Festival, a well-known local show. Mario started his career at the age of 17, when he sang Nuvole D'Ammore. That night, he shared the stage with famous artists such as Giacomo Rondinella, Tecla Scarano and Nicla Di Bruno. Soon, his fame started to build as he performed with famous singers Gennaro Pasquariello and Claudio Villa in Porta Capuana. In 1961, Mario Trevi was invited to Totò's house, a well-known comedian, in Rome, who asked him to sing Malafemmena, a famous song written by Totò himself. In that same year Trevi married Titina Spagnolo, the daughter of a Neapolitan record dealer. In 1965, two days after the birth of their second child, Titina died of aneurysm. Among many who honored her at her funeral was Sergio Bruni. In 1967, despite family opposition, Trevi married Titina's younger sister, Teresa, with whom he had two more daughters.

== Career ==
During his career, Mario Trevi has recorded more than eight hundred songs and has participated in ten Festival of Naples. In 1959, he recorded the first series of 78's with the Royal records. Among Mario Trevi's famous songs several have become classics, such as Indifferentemente (1963), Mare Verde (1961, written by Giuseppe Marotta), Me Parlano 'e Te (1964, written by the poet Salvatore Palomba and music by Antonio Vian), Settembre Cu' Mme' (1962, written by Renato flowers and music by Antonio Vian), and Cara Busciarda (1969, directed by Eduardo Alfieri). Because of his successful career, Mario Trevi was appointed to the Encyclopedia of the Neapolitan song by Ettore De Mura.

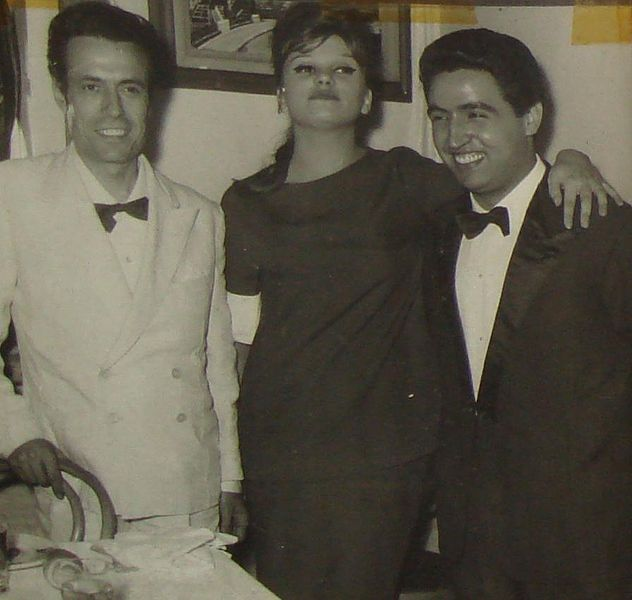
Salvatore Mazzocco, Milva and Mario Trevi in 1961

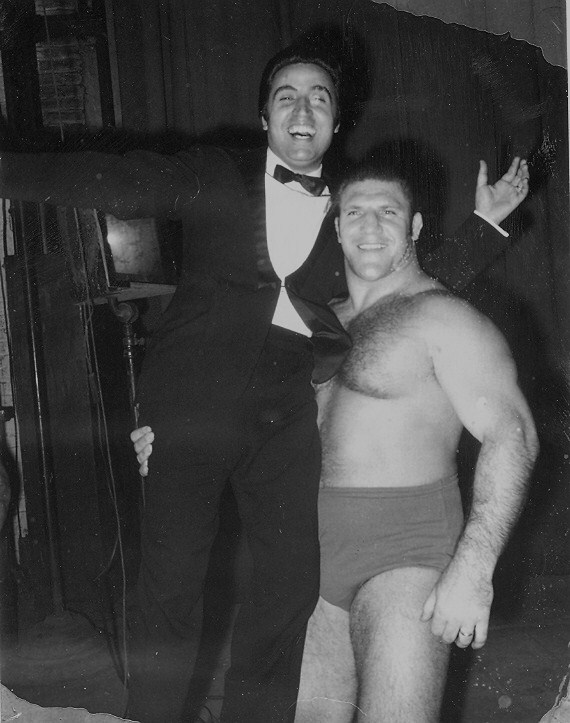
Bruno Sammartino and Mario Trevi

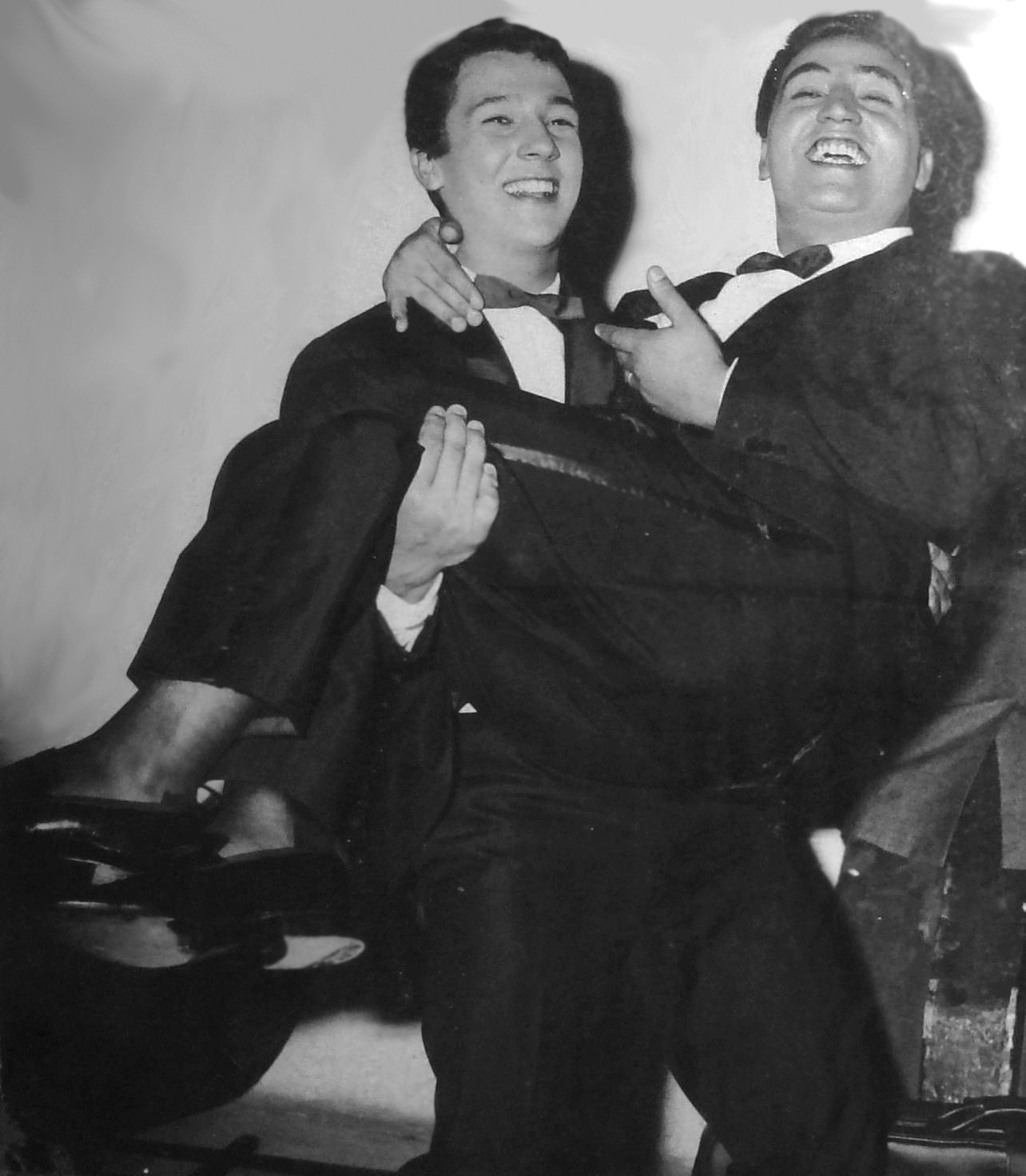
Robertino Loreti and Mario Trevi in 1964

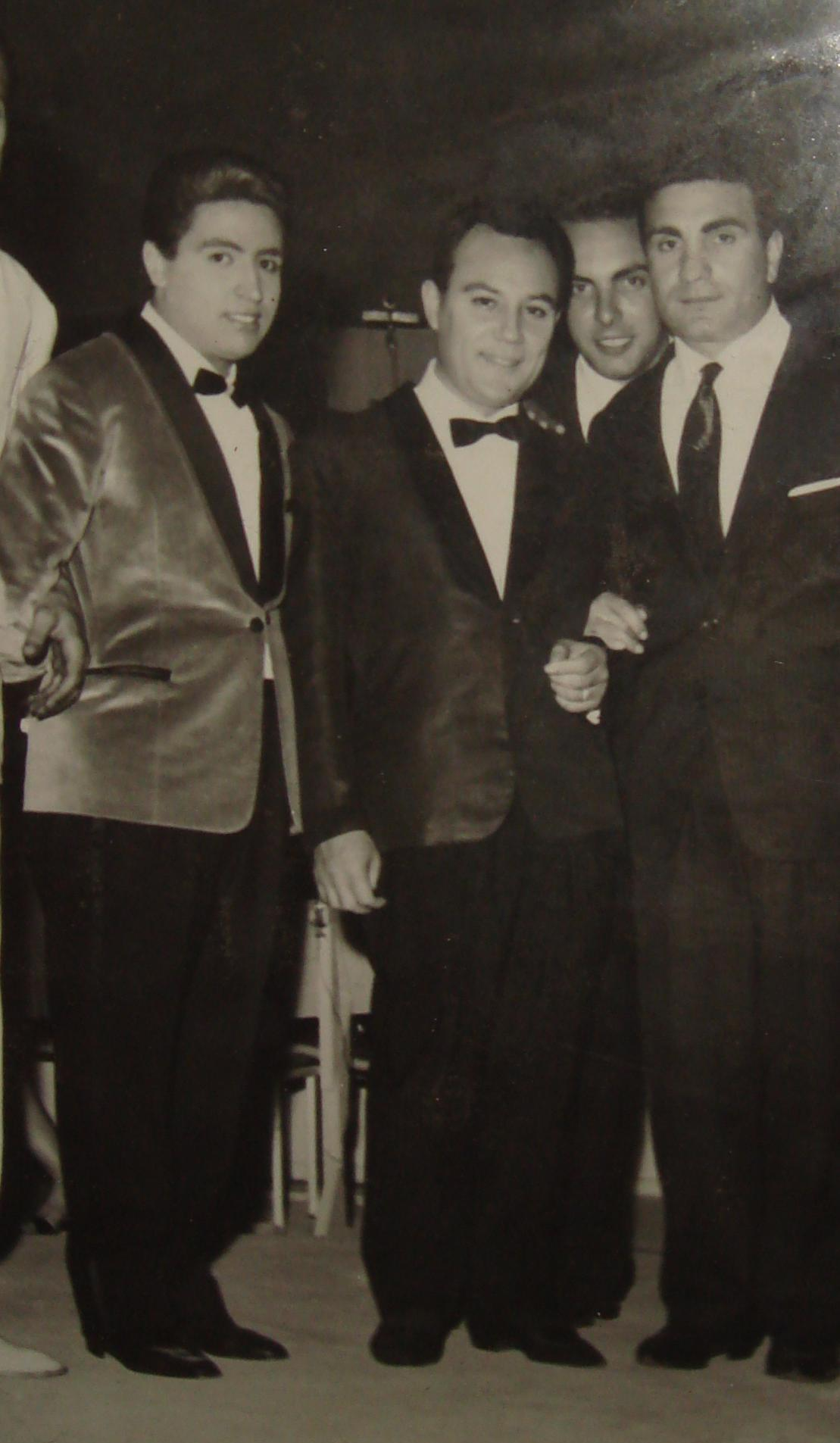
Mario Trevi and Claudio Villa in 1962

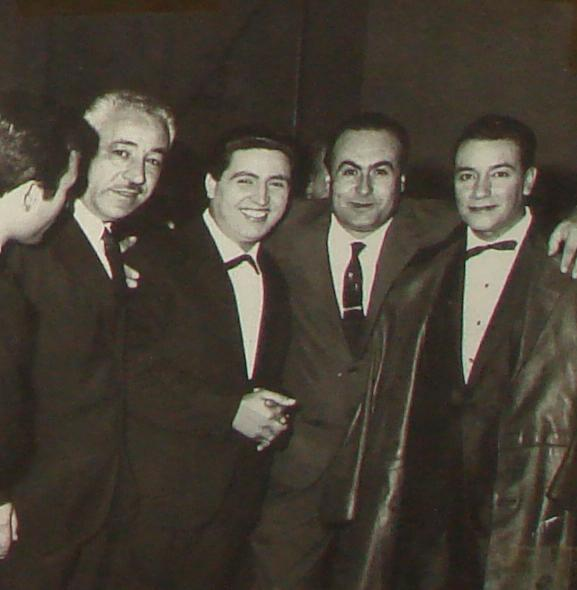
Trevi and Mario Abbate in 1963

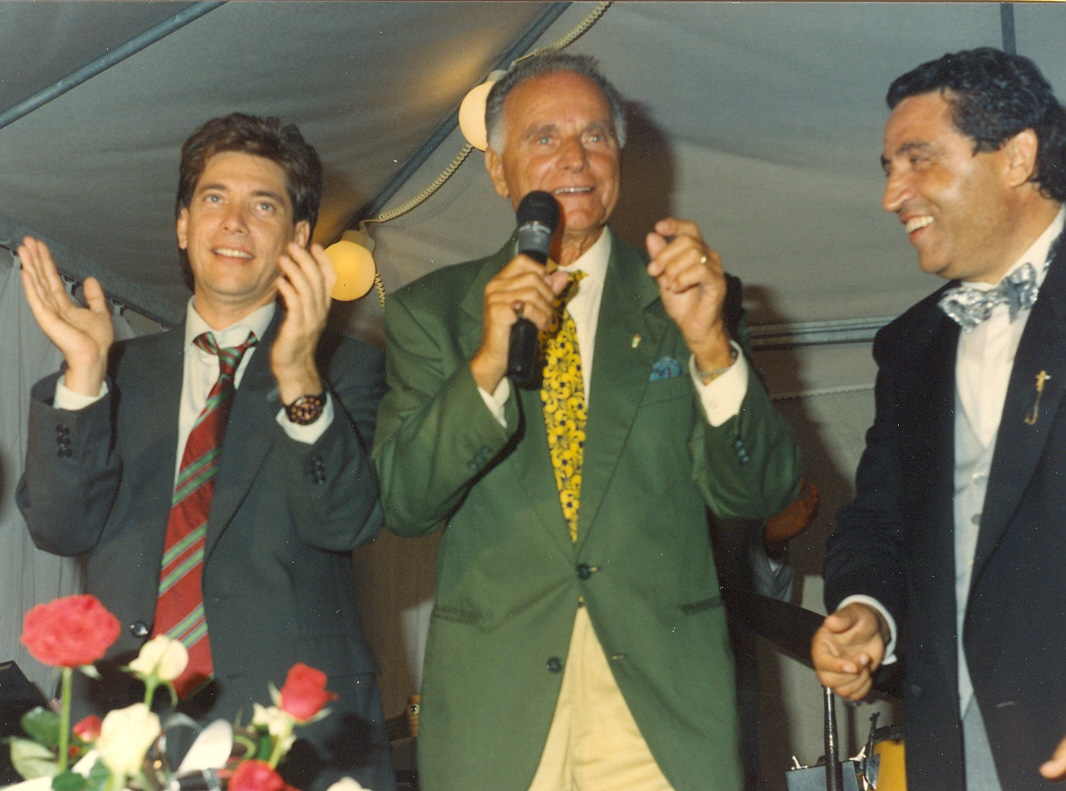
Nino D'Angelo, Alberto Amato and Trevi in 1992

In 1973 Trevi devoted himself to a new musical genre known as "songs of the underworld," and to the sceneggiata. Among many of his plays, 'A Paggella, brought so much success that was filmed in 1980 and directed by Ninì Grassia, starring Mario Trevi, Marc Porel, Rosalia Maggio, Beniamino Maggio, Marzio Onorato, Marisa Laurito. In 1981 he was scheduled to play in another movie, 'O Carabiniere, but he ended up turning down the opportunity and his character was played by Fabio Testi. In 1978, Mario Trevi took on tours to the U.S. and Canada. In New York, he sang at the Madison Square Garden, at the Brooklyn Academy of Music and at the Kenkiol Theatre. He also participated in a tour in Europe and worked side by side with other Italian artists such as, Luciano Tajoli, Nilla Pizzi, and Claudio Villa. In 1995 he recorded an album with Zeus Record, a record making company, where he sang Pino Daniele's songs. In 1997 he was invited by Paolo Limiti in the show Ci vediamo in Tv and in 2001, Piero Chiambretti and Fabio Fazio invited him to the Festival della canzone italiana to represent the Neapolitan song genre. Mario Trevi also participated in television shows such as Canzonissima, Napoli Contro Tutti, Scala Reale, Canzoni alla Finestra, 4 Passi Tra Le Note, Il Paroliere, Questo Sconosciuto, 15 Minuti Con ..., La Fiera dei Sogni, Senza Rete, Napoli Prima e Dopo, Viva Napoli, Domenica In, Mezzogiorno in Famiglia, La vita in diretta.

On 26 November 2005 Mario Trevi was appointed, Knight of Malta, together with Bruno Venturini and Mario Merola.

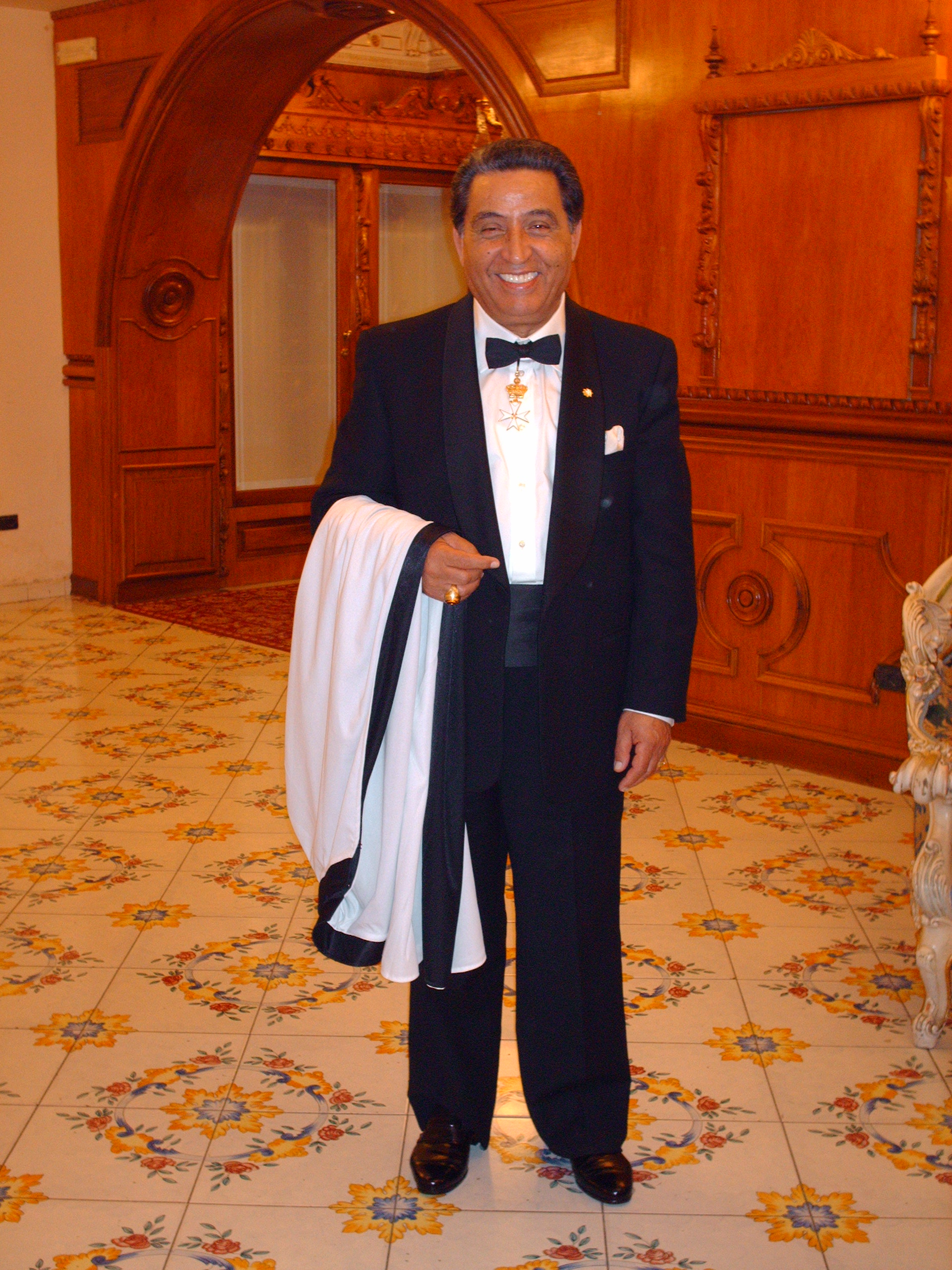
Mario Trevi in 2005

On 22 September 2009 Mario Trevi inaugurated its official website and entered the world of YouTube. On 24 September 2009 he participated in the Premio Carosone 2009, held at the Arena Flegrea, Mostra d'Oltremare in Naples, where he sang Indifferentemente, Scalinatella and Giacca Rossa 'e Russetto. On 4 November, Mario participated in the show Omaggio a Sergio Bruni (Tribute to Sergio Bruni) where he sang the songs Lusingame and Carmela, and paired with Enzo Gragnaniello in singing Indifferentemente. On 17 April 2010 Mario Trevi starred a new beginning with Luna Bianca, a live concert created to tour Italy. In Luna Bianca, Trevi is accompanied by six young members of the Orchestra Luna Bianca and two young voices, performing the revisiting classic Neapolitan songs with new music arrangements consisting of accelerated rhythms combined with the folklore of the Neapolitan song, a remake Turbo-folk genre.

== Discography ==
- 1961: Senti Napoli e poi...
- 1961: Naples – Today (London Records)
- 1964: Indifferentemente
- 1964: Mario Trevi con la orquesta de E.Alfieri (Ronde de Venezuela)
- 1965: Canzoni napoletane classiche
- 1966: Canzoni napoletane moderne
- 1970: Mario Trevi & Mirna Doris, Ammore 'e Napule (Fiesta record company)
- 1974: Le disque d'or des Chansons Napolitanes – Mario Trevi (Pickwick Records)
- 1975: Mario Trevi – vol.1
- 1975: Mario Trevi – vol.2
- 1975: Mario Trevi – vol.3
- 1975: Mario Trevi
- 1975: Si me sonno Napule
- 1975: Papà
- 1975: 'Nu telegramma
- 1975: Mario Trevi
- 1976: Mario Trevi recita le sue sceneggiate nel ruolo di 1° attore
- 1976: 'O presepio
- 1977: 'A paggella
- 1977: Senti Napoli e poi... (Sicamericana Sacifi)
- 1978: 'A befana
- 1978: Mario Trevi – 12° volume
- 1979: La sceneggiata napoletana
- 1979: 'E candeline
- 1979: Canzoni di Napoli (Music Hall)
- 1981: Mario Trevi – 14° volume
- 1982: Mario Trevi – 15° volume
- 1983: Mario Trevi – 18° volume
- 1984: Mario Trevi – 19° volume
- 1985: 'Nfizzo 'nfizzo
- 1986: Nun è 'nu tradimento
- 1986: Ancora io
- 1989: I miei successi di ieri... cantati oggi
- 1991: Tu si importante
- 1992: Cento canzoni da ricordare – vol.1
- 1992: Cento canzoni da ricordare – vol.2
- 1992: Cento canzoni da ricordare – vol.3
- 1992: Cento canzoni da ricordare – vol.4
- 1994: Cento canzoni da ricordare – vol.5
- 1994: Cento canzoni da ricordare – vol.6
- 1994: Carezze d'autore
- 1995: ...Pecché te voglio bene
- 1995: ...Niente – Trevi canta Daniele
- 1996: Nustalgia
- 2008: Il capitano e il marinaio
- 2011: Napoli Turbo Folk

== Filmography ==
- 1980 – La pagella
- 2025 - Indiffentemente... Mario Trevi

== Theater ==
- Cunfiette 'e sposa (1969)
- Sulitario (1970)
- 'O carabiniere (1972)
- 'A mano nera (1973)
- 'O cammurrista (1973)
- Cella 17 (1974)
- 'O mariuolo (1975)
- 'O fuggiasco (1975)
- 'O rre d'è magliare (1976)
- 'Nu telegramma (1976)
- 'O presepio (1976)
- 'O professore (1977)
- 'A paggella (1977)
- 'A Befana (1978)
- 'O metronotte (1979)
- 'O diario (1979)
- Papà (1980)
- Astrignete 'a 'mme (1980)
- 'O tesoro (1981)
- 'O carabiniere (1981)

== Bibliography ==
- Ettore De Mura, Enciclopedia della Canzone Napoletana, Napoli, Il Torchio, 1969 (Trevi Mario, p. 380).
- Pietro Gargano – Gianni Cesarini, La Canzone Napoletana, Milano, Rizzoli editore, 1984.
- Annuario del cinema italiano, editore: Centro studi di cultura, promozione e diffusione del cinema, 1986.
- Annuario del cinema italiano, editore: Centro studi di cultura, promozione e diffusione del cinema, 1990.
- Gino Castaldo, Dizionario della canzone italiana, Armando Curcio Editore, 1990.
- Vittorio Paliotti, Storia della canzone napoletana: i primi canti popolari, le antiche villanelle, le melodie celebri in tutto il mondo..., Newton Compton, 1992.
- Pino Farinotti, Dizionario degli attori, tutti gli attori e i loro film, Varese, Sugarco Edizioni, 1993.
- Salvatore Tolino, Mostra storica permanente della Poesia, del Teatro e della Canzone Napoletana, Istituto Grafico Editoriale Italiano, 1999.
- Joe Vitale, Viaggio nell'etnomusica: Manuale di musica popolare, ILA Palma, 2000.
- Giovanni Alfano, Napule è 'na canzone, Antologia della canzone napoletana, Salerno, Palladio Editrice, 2001.
- Dario Salvatori, Dizionario della canzoni italiane, Roma, Elle U Multimedia, 2001.
- Pasquale Scialò, La Sceneggiata, rappresentazione di un genere popolare, Napoli, Guida, 2002.
- Mario Merola – Geo Nocchetti, Napoli solo andata...il mio lungo viaggio, Sperling & Kupfer, 2005.
- Enrico Careri – Pasquale Scialò, Studi sulla canzone napoletana classica, Libreria musicale italiana, 2008.
- Tiziano Tarli e Pierpaolo De Iulis, Vesuvio Pop, la nuova canzone melodica napoletana, Rome, Arcana Editore, 2009.
- Salvatore Palomba – Stefano Fedele, Le Canzoni di Napoli, Napoli, L'Ancora del Mediterraneo, 2009.
- Pasquale Scialò, Storie di musica, Napoli, Guida, 2010.
- Antonio Sciotti, Cantanapoli. Enciclopedia del Festival della Canzone Napoletana 1952–1981, Napoli, Luca Torre editore, 2011.
- Pietro Gargano, Nuova Enciclopedia Illustrata della Canzone Napoletana vol. VII, Napoli, ed. Magmata, 2015.
