= Cinzia Oscar =

Italian singer (1962–2026)

Vincenza Testa (20 October 1962 – 15 March 2026), better known as Cinzia Oscar, was an Italian singer and theatre actor.

== Life and career ==
Testa was born in Naples on 20 October 1962. She began her career at the age of 7 with her father, who performed as the Oscar Trio, replacing her sick brother in the theatre. Later, she participated in a show with Gigi Sabani and Pietro De Vico as a comedic impersonator. In the early years at the theatre, she also worked, among others, with Pino Mauro.

In 1979, she recorded her first album, Caro diario/Vita 'e 'nfamità. She was known for pop songs, including: Nun sò na bambola and Caro figlio mio, Na lettera, Maledizione, Gesù, Giuseppe, S. Anna and Maria, It's your fault, The lovers amongst others.

Over the years, she participated in several festivals in Naples and dueted with many artists of the classical and neo-melodic Neapolitan song genres, including a duet with Mario Merola Si tu papa, and also at the Naples Festival in 2002; L'urdeme de grande.

In 2015, she took part in a television programme conducted by Teo Teocoli broadcast on Rai 3, Teo in the box.

In June 2016, she announced that she was filing a complaint against the producers of the TV series Gomorrah, for the unauthorized use of her song Nun so' na bambola.

Testa died after a long illness in Naples, on 15 March 2026, at the age of 63.
