= Putipù =

Italian musical instrument

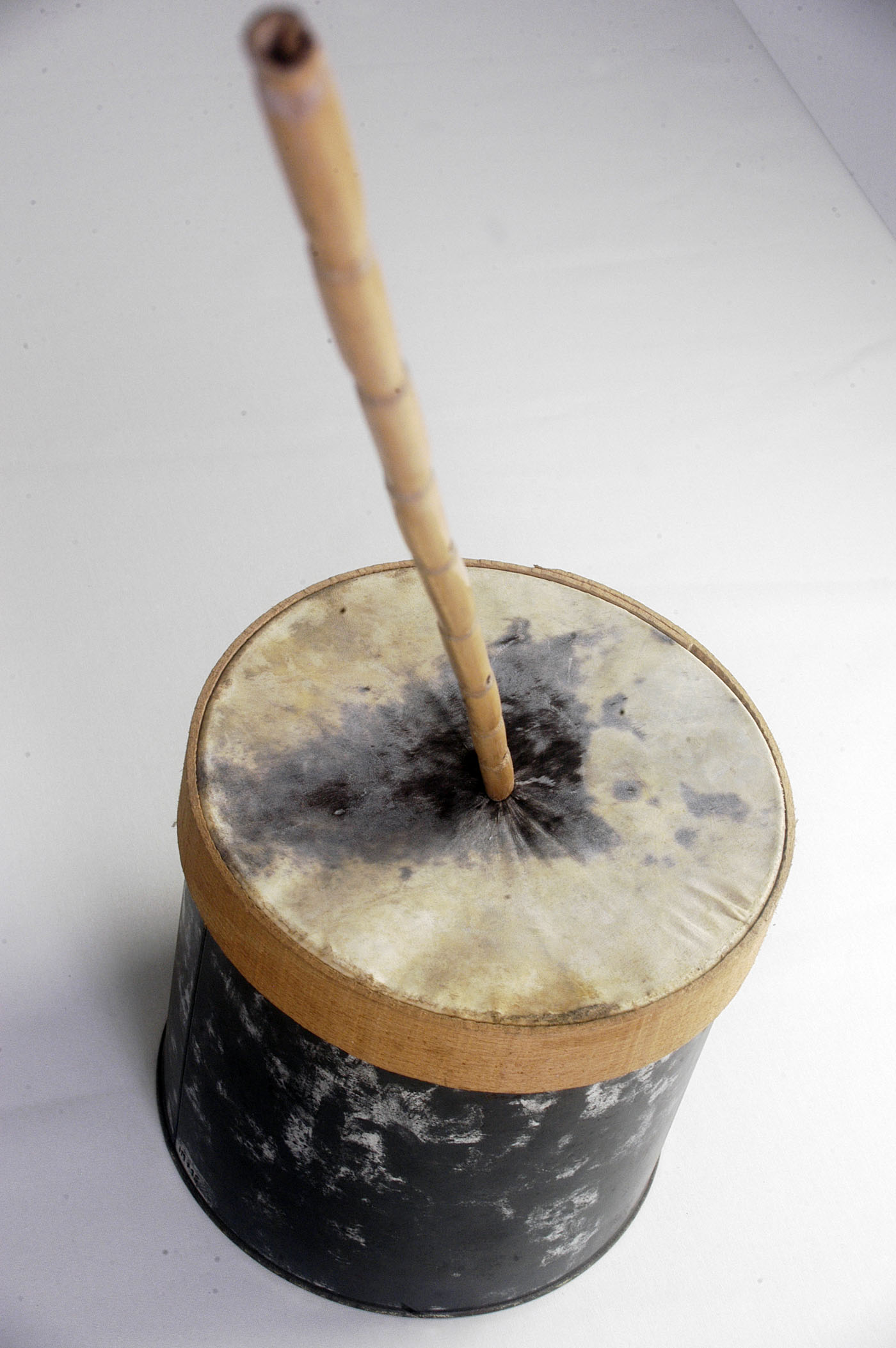
Putipù. Collection of Museo Azzarini.

The putipù is a musical instrument traditionally used in folk music of Southern Italy, in particular of Naples and surrounding regions. It is a friction drum, consisting of a cylindrical sound box closed at the top by a stretched membrane, with a bamboo cane attached at the center. The instrument is played by rubbing the rod with a wet hand, cloth, or sponge, that causes the membrane to vibrate.

The putipu exists in several variants, differing on the materials and dimensions. Other common names are caccavella, puti-puti, pignato, cute-cute, cupellone, bufù (in Molise) and cupa-cupa (especially in Apulia). Some of these names are onomatopoeias of the sound. The instrument is also called pernacchiatore (literally "raspberry blower") on account of its sound.

== Parts and variations ==
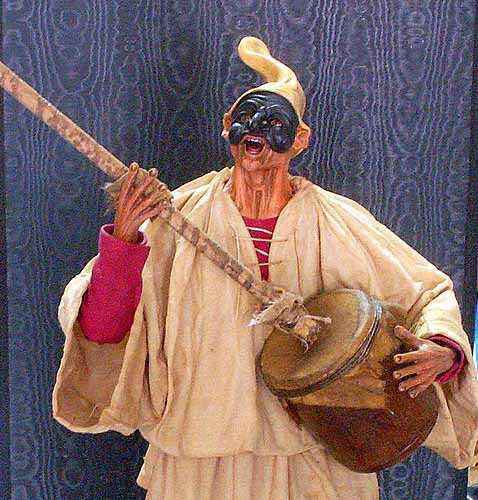
Ceramic image of the Neapolitan folk character Pulcinella playing the putipù.

In the variants called caccavella and pan-bomba, the sound box is made of earthenware (from a high quality clay which is used in the Southern part o Italy for making vases, plates and cooking pans). The putipù proper uses a small wooden tub or barrel instead, and the cupellone uses a larger one. The sound box can also be a large tin can, like those used for tomatoes. The edges of the sound box may be decorated with colored ribbons.

The membrane is usually made from the skin of an animal; generally of goat, sheep or rabbit, very rarely of donkey or of calf. A heavy cloth may be used instead.

The lower end of the bamboo cane is inserted in a hole made in the middle of the membrane, and tightly tied to it. The upper end of the cane may have some decorative element.

== See also ==
- Music of Naples
