= The Mafia Triangle =

- Directed by: Alfonso Brescia
- Written by: Alfonso Brescia; Gino Capone
- Produced by: Giuseppe Colombo
- Starring: Mario Merola
- Cinematography: Silvio Fraschetti
- Music by: Eduardo Alfieri
- Release date: 1981
- Language: Italian

The Mafia Triangle (Italian: Napoli, Palermo, New York: Il triangolo della camorra) is a 1981 Italian "poliziottesco" film written and directed by Alfonso Brescia and starring Mario Merola. It is an unofficial remake of Brescia's 1978 film Napoli … serenata calibro 9.

== Cast ==
- Mario Merola as Don Gennaro Savarese
- Howard Ross as Commissioner Galante
- Giacomo Rizzo as Peppino
- Lucio Montanaro as Bambinello
- Massimo Mollica as Don Francesco 'O Biancone
- Liana Trouché as Teresa
- Guido Alberti as Police Chief
- Biagio Pelligra as Coppola
- Guido Leontini as Malvasia
- Ugo Bologna as TV Manager
- Fabrizio Nascimbene as Masaniello
- Nello Pazzafini as Sgt. Martinez

== See also ==
- List of Italian films of 1981
