= Mario Merola (singer) =

Italian singer and actor (1934–2006)

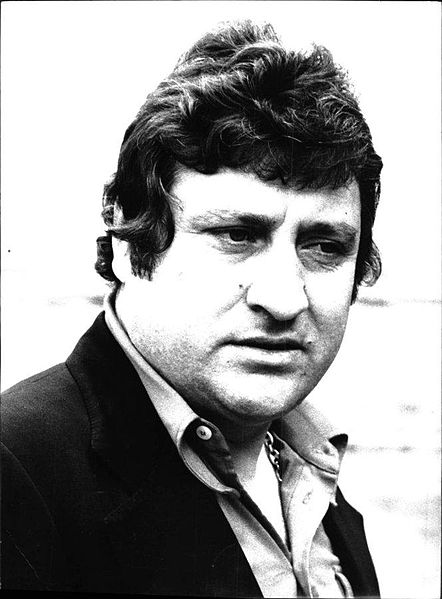

Background information
- Born: 6 April 1934; Naples, Kingdom of Italy
- Origin: Campania, Italy
- Died: 12 November 2006 (aged 72); Castellamare di Stabia, Italy
- Genres: Canzone napoletana; sceneggiata; pop music
- Occupations: Singer; actor
- Years active: 1959–2006
- Labels: Phonotris; Zeus; Hello; Storm; Arlecchino; Deafon; Edibi
- Website: mariomerola.it

Mario Merola (Italian pronunciation: [ˈmaːrjo ˈmɛːrola]; 6 April, 1934 – 12 November, 2006) was an Italian singer and actor. He has been nicknamed "The King of the Sceneggiata" (Italian: il Re della sceneggiata), a type of regional drama originating in Naples and later finding more widespread recognition.

== Career ==
Mario Merola began his career as a longshoreman at the Port of Naples. His first public singing performance occurred by chance, when he sang during a celebration of the Virgin Mary, at the church of Sant’Anna alle Paludi when the scheduled singer, Mario Trevi, was delayed.

In 1964, he first performed at the Festival of Naples with the song Doce è ’o silenzio (“Sweet is the silence”), with Elsa Quarta.

He performed at the festival a number of times in the 1960-70s. He also performed and won in 2001, performing L’urdemo emigrante (“The Last Emigrant”) with his son Francesco.

He recorded about 40 records of sceneggiata music and had additional credits in filmed versions. He toured abroad with a Neapolitan company to present the sceneggiata to emigrant Italian communities. During the 1970s, Merola performed at the White House, showcasing the Neapolitan genre.

In addition to his own music career, Merola was a talent scout, contributing to the early careers of Massimo Ranieri, Nino D'Angelo, and Gigi D'Alessio, among others.

At the Sanremo Music Festival 1994, he formed "Team Italy", performing "Una vecchia canzone italiana" (“An Old Italian Song”) with Nilla Pizzi, Wess, Wilma Goich, Manuela Villa, Tony Santagata, Jimmy Fontana, Gianni Nazzaro, Lando Fiorini, Rosanna Fratello, and Giuseppe Cionfoli. The group recorded an album of the same name, featuring collective and individual recordings.

== Personal life and death ==
Merola married Rosa Serrapiglia on 5 April, 1964. They had three children: Roberto (a musical events organizer), Loredana (a homemaker), and Francesco (a singer), who occasionally performed alongside his father.

In 1997, Merola was hospitalized for three weeks at Naples’ Vecchio Pellegrini Hospital for a cardiorespiratory crisis. He subsequently recovered.

On 26 November, 2005, Merola was appointed a Knight of Malta, alongside Bruno Venturini and Mario Trevi.

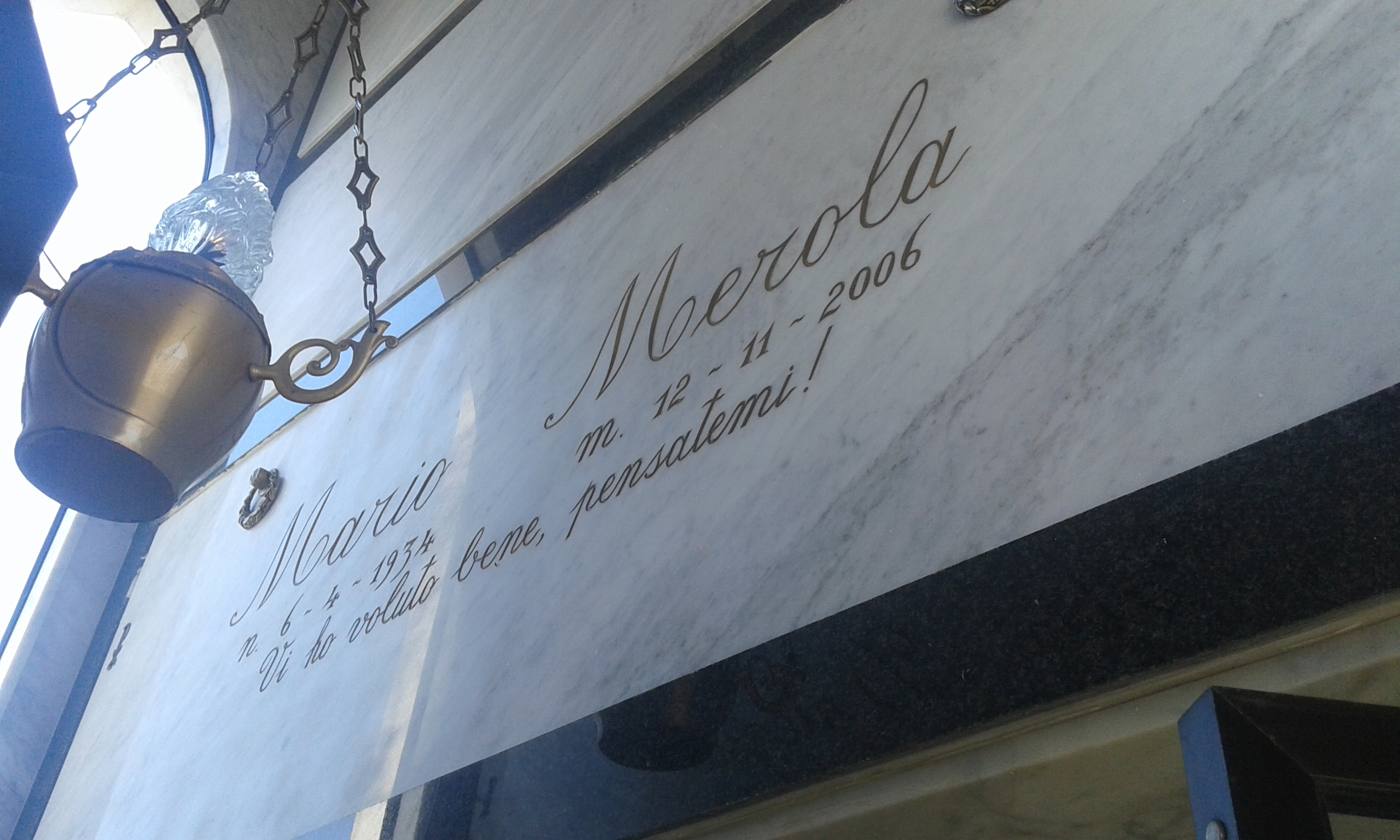
Merola's gravestone in Naples

Merola died on November 12, 2006, at the age of 72 in Castellammare di Stabia, after breathing difficulties.

His funeral was held on November 14, 2006, at the Basilica of Santa Maria del Carmine Maggiore in Naples in the same church where he was married. It was attended by family, political figures, and professional colleagues. An estimated 40,000 people gathered outside. A large number followed the procession to his burial at the Monumental Cemetery of Naples.

== Legacy ==
During the Sanremo Festival 2000, Bono of U2 fell into the crowd during a performance and encountered Mario Merola.

In 2004, Hugo Race released The Merola Matrix, an album of 16 songs using excerpts from some of Merola's older songs and film scenes.

In 2008, the restaurant‑museum Felicissima sera (“Very happy evening”) opened in Naples, displaying photos, objects and memorabilia related to the singer. It also includes a letter written by Eduardo De Filippo to Merola dated 29 October 1976. His children, Roberto and Francesco, collaborated with designer Nadia Wanderlingh among others.

In 2009, a commemorative bust of Merola was erected in the Sant’Anna alle Paludi district of Naples. Created by sculptor Domenico Sepe, it bears the inscription: “Mario Merola, ambassador of Neapolitan songs in the world.”

On 18 September, 2010, a memorial concert for Merola was held at the Stadio San Ciro in Portici, featuring, among others, Francesco Merola, Tullio De Piscopo, Sal Da Vinci, Gigi Finizio, Gianni Fiorellino, Mario Da Vinci, Valentina Stella, Gloriana, and Gigi D'Alessio.

== Music festival participation ==
=== Festival of Naples ===
- 1964
  - "Doce è 'o silenzio" (Acampora – Martingano) with Elsa Quarta, 12th Festival of Neapolitan Song – not finalist
- 1965
  - "T'aspetto a maggio" (Dura – Scuotto – Esposito) with Achille Togliani, 13th Festival of Neapolitan Song – 7th place
  - "Tu stasera si Pusilleco" (Amato – E. Buonafede) with Enzo Del Forno, 13th Festival of Neapolitan Song – not finalist
- 1966
  - "Ciento catene" (Chiarazzo – Ruocco) with Maria Paris, 14th Festival of Neapolitan Song – 5th place
  - "Femmene e tammorre" (E. Bonagura – Lumini) with Daisy Lumini, 14th Festival of Neapolitan Song – not finalist
- 1967
  - "Allegretto ma non troppo" (De Crescenzo – D'Annibale) with Mario Abbate, 15th Festival of Neapolitan Song – 6th place
  - "Freve 'e gelusia" (Chiarazzo – Pelligiano) with Maria Paris, 15th Festival of Neapolitan Song – 9th place
- 1968
  - "Cchiù forte 'e me" (U. Martucci – Colosimo – Landi) with Ben Venuti, 16th Festival of Neapolitan Song – not finalist
  - "Comm'a nu sciummo" (Barrucci – Gregoretti – C. Esposito) with Mario Trevi, 16th Festival of Neapolitan Song – not finalist
- 1969
  - "'O masto" (Pelliggiano – Mammone – De Caro – Petrucci) with Antonio Buonomo, 17th Festival of Neapolitan Song – 5th place
  - "Abbracciame" (Romeo – Dura – Troia) with Giulietta Sacco, 17th Festival of Neapolitan Song – 7th place
  - "Ciento appuntamente" (Langella – Falsetti) with Luciano Rondinella, 17th Festival of Neapolitan Song – 13th place
- 1970
  - "Chitarra rossa" (Russo – V. – S. Mazzocco) with Mirna Doris, 18th Festival of Neapolitan Song – 5th place
  - "'Nnammurato 'e te!" (Fiorini – Schiano) with Luciano Rondinella, 18th Festival of Neapolitan Song – 6th place
  - "'O guastafeste" (Moxedano – Colucci – Sorrentino – Cofra) with Luciano Rondinella, 18th Festival of Neapolitan Song – 12th place
- 1971
  - "Stella nera" (Russo – Genta) with Luciano Rondinella, 19th Festival of Neapolitan Song – program closed for organizational reasons
- 2001
  - "L'urdemo emigrante" (V. Campagnoli – G. Campagnoli – M. Guida – G. Quirito) with Francesco Merola, 24th Festival of Neapolitan Song – 1st place/winner

=== Sanremo Festival ===
- 1994
  - "Una vecchia canzone italiana" (Stefano Jurgens – Marcello Marrocchi), Squadra Italia with Nilla Pizzi, Manuela Villa, Jimmy Fontana, Gianni Nazzaro, Wilma Goich, Wess, Giuseppe Cionfoli, Tony Santagata, Lando Fiorini and Rosanna Fratello, 44th Festival of Italian Song – 19th place

== Selected discography ==
=== 33 rpm ===
- 1967 – Mario Merola (1° album of 1967)|Mario Merola (Zeus, BE 0015)
- 1967 – Mario Merola (2° album of 1967)|Mario Merola (Zeus, BE 0016)
- 1970 – 6 sceneggiate cantate da Mario Merola (Zeus, TM 55460)
- 1972 – Cumpagne ‘e cella, Mario Trevi – Mario Merola (West records, WLP 104)
- 1972 – Passione eterna (33 giri)|Passione eterna (West records, WLP 101)
- 1973 – Volume primo (Hello, ZSEL 55404)
- 1973 – Volume secondo (Hello, ZSEL 55405)
- 1973 – Canzoni 'nziste (Rifi variety record, ST 19154)
- 1973 – Madonna verde (Storm, BR 002)
- 1973 – Tribunale (33 giri)|Tribunale (Storm, BR 004)
- 1975 – Classiche napoletane Vol. 6 – Merola canta Libero Bovio (Hello, ZSEL 55411)
- 1975 – Mario Merola e Pino Mauro (Hello, ZSEL 55413)
- 1975 – 5 sceneggiate cantate da Mario Merola (Hello, ZSEL 55436)
- 1975 – Vol. 5° (Hello, ZSEL 55441)
- 1975 – Eternamente tua (Storm, TM 55402)
- 1976 – Volume quarto (Zeus, ZSV BS 3022)
- 1977 – Legge d'onore (Lineavis, LV 3376)
- 1977 – Licenza 'e carcerato (Storm, ZSLTM 55453)
- 1978 – Canta Napoli (Record, LP)
- 1978 – 6 sceneggiate (Storm, TM 55474)
- 1979 – Si chesta e' 'a legge – Vol. 9° (Storm, ZSL TM 55461)
- 1980 – Zappatore sceneggiata (Hello, ZSEL 55466)
- 1980 – 'A dolce vita (Lineavis, LV 3302)
- 1981 – Chiamate Napoli 081 (Storm)
- 1982 – Carcerato (33 giri)|Carcerato (Storm, TM 55474)
- 1982 – 'O rre d' 'a sceneggiata (33 giri)|'O rre d' 'a sceneggiata (Storm, TM 55477)

=== 45 rpm ===
- 1963 – Malufiglio/L'urdemo avvertimento (Mario Merola)|Malufiglio/L'urdemo avvertimento (Deafon, CT 001)
- 1963 – Scugnezziello/'O primmo giuramento (Deafon, CT 004)
- 1963 – So' nnato carcerato/Quatt'anne ammore (Phonotris, CS 5001)
- 1963 – Femmena nera/L'ultima buscia (Phonotris, CS 5002)
- 1963 – Dicite all'avvocato/Nun ce sarrà dimane (Phonotris, CS 5007)
- 1963 – Quatto mura/Gelusia d'ammore (Phonotris, CS 5008)
- 1963 – Se cagnata 'a scena/Amici (Phonotris, CS 5009)
- 1963 – 'O primmo giuramento/Scugnezziello (Phonotris, CS 5010)
- 1963 – L'urdemo bicchiere/Velo niro (Phonotris, CS 5019)
- 1963 – Tu me lasse/Malommo (Phonotris, CS 5020)
- 1964 – Malommo/Tu me lasse (Zeus, BE 117)
- 1964 – 'A fede (l'urdemo bicchiere)/Velo niro (Zeus, BE 118)
- 1964 – Canciello 'e cunvento/Dduje sciure arancio (Zeus, BE 121)
- 1964 – Rosa 'nfamità/Nu poco 'e tutte cose (Zeus, BE 125)
- 1964 – Doce è 'o silenzio/'Mbrellino 'e seta (Zeus, BE 126)
- 1964 – Suonno 'e cancelle/Ddoje vote carcerato (Zeus, BE 132)
- 1964 – 'O zampugnaro/Acale 'e scelle (Zeus, BE 133)
- 1964 – Te chiammavo Maria/Schiavo senza catene (Zeus, BE 134)
- 1964 – 'A sciurara/Se ne ghiuta (Zeus, BE 137)
- 1965 – Tu stasera sì Pusilleco/T'aspetto a maggio (Zeus, BE 144)
- 1965 – Legge d'onore/Parola d'onore (Zeus, BE 148)
- 1966 – 'Nu capriccio/'A prucessione (Zeus, BE 178)
- 1966 – L'ultima 'nfamità/Carmela Spina (Zeus, BE 179)
- 1966 – Canzona marinaresca/'Nu capriccio (Zeus, BE 180)
- 1966 – Scetate/'O zampugnaro (Zeus, BE 181)
- 1966 – Core furastiero/Carmela Spina (Zeus, BE 182)
- 1966 – Pusilleco addiruso/L'ultima 'nfamità (Zeus, BE 183)
- 1966 – 'O mare 'e Margellina/Surdate (Zeus, BE 184)
- 1966 – Canzona marinaresca/Pusilleco addiruso (Zeus, BE 185)
- 1966 – Femmene e tammorre/Dipende a te (Zeus, BE 188)
- 1966 – Ciento catene/Tengo a mamma ca m'aspetta (Zeus, BE 189)
- 1966 – E bonanotte 'a sposa/Mamma schiavona (Zeus, BE 195)
- 1966 – 'A voce 'e mamma/Surriento d' 'e 'nnammurate (Zeus, BE 196)
- 1967 – 'A bandiera/Senza guapparia (Zeus, BE 199)
- 1967 – Allegretto...ma non troppo/'E vvarchetelle (Zeus, BE 203)
- 1967 – Freva 'e gelusia/N'ata passione (Zeus, BE 204)
- 1967 – 'E quatte vie/Luna dispettosa (Zeus, BE 207)
- 1967 – Dal Vesuvio con amore/Fantasia (Zeus, BE 212)
- 1968 – Ammanettato/Mamma schiavona (Zeus, BE 221)
- 1968 – Malaspina/Bonanotte 'a sposa (Zeus, BE 222)
- 1968 – Comm' 'a 'nu sciummo/Malasera (Zeus, BE 224)
- 1968 – Cchiù forte 'e me/Uocchie 'e mare (Zeus, BE 225)
- 1969 – 'O Milurdino/Signora 'nfamità (Hello, HR 9022)
- 1970 – 'Na santa guapparia/Miracolo d'ammore (Hello, HR 9023)
- 1970 – Nnammurato 'e te!/'O giurnale (Hello, HR 9025)
- 1970 – Chitarra rossa/Salutammela (Hello, HR 9027)
- 1970 – L'Urdema Carta/Chella d'o terzo piano (Hello, HR 9034)
- 1971 – 'A camorra/Amico, permettete! (Hello, HR 9041)
- 1971 – Stella nera/Cielo e mare (Hello, HR 9056)
- 1971 – Via nova/Ddoje serenate (Hello, HR 9069)
- 1971 – Chitarra Tragica/A Montevergine (Hello, HR 9070)
- 1972 – 'O Festino/'A Legge (Hello, HR 9079)
- 1972 – Lacreme Napulitane/Tatonno se nne va (Hello, HR 9082)
- 1972 – Mamma addò stà/Chiove (Hello, HR 9085)
- 1972 – 'A bravura/'A congiura (Hello, HR 9101)
- 1972 – Passione eterna/'A dolce vita (Arlecchino, ARL 3001)
- 1973 – Madonna verde/N'ata passione (Storm, SR 703)
- 1974 – Eternamente tua/Chi s'annammora 'e te (Storm, SR 713)
- 1975 – Inferno d'ammore/Vagabondo d'o mare (Edibi, ZEDB 50238)
- 1981 – Ave Maria/Napoli canta Napoli (Storm, ZTM 50507)

=== CDs ===
- 1973 – Mario Merola e Giulietta Sacco (Zeus Record)
- 1975 – 'O Clan d' 'e napulitane
- 1978 – Mario Merola canta Libero Bovio
- 1979 – Ave Maria (D.V. More Record)
- 1980 – Zappatore (D.V. More Record)
- 1985 – Passione eterna (Video Sound Market, CD 730)
- 1989 – 'O mare 'e margellina (Zeus Record, ZS 0052)
- 1990 – Cuore di Napoli (D.V. More Record)
- 1993 – 'A sciurara (Zeus Record, ZS 0222)
- 1993 – Quattro mura (Mario Merola)|Quattro mura (Alpha Records, CD AR 7052)
- 1994 – Trasmette Napoli (Mea Sound, SIAE CD 303)
- 1994 – Una vecchia canzone italiana (con il gruppo Squadra Italia) (Pravo Music)
- 1994 – Tangentopoli (album)|Tangentopoli (Mea Sound, MEA CD 351)
- 1997 – Chiamate Napoli... 081 (D.V. More Record)
- 1997 – 'E figlie... (D.V. More Record)
- 1997 – Lacrime napulitane (CD)|Lacrime napulitane (D.V. More Record)
- 1997 – Carcerato (CD)|Carcerato (D.V. More Record)
- 1997 – Guapparia (CD)|Guapparia (D.V. More Record)
- 1998 – Malommo (CD)|Malommo (Replay Music)
- 2000 – Guaglione 'e malavita – Mario Merola e Pino Mauro
- 2001 – Malavicina (Mea Sound, MEACD 112)
- 2004 – Auguri vita mia (Mea Sound)
- 2005 – Gelosia (CD)|Gelosia (D.V. More Record)
- 2005 – Dicite all'avvocato

==== Album live ====
- 2004 – Mario Merola 40-45-70 (CD)|Mario Merola 40-45-70 (D.V. More Record)
- 2005 – Merola insieme (with Francesco) (Mea Sound)

=== Collected partial ===
- 1988 – Ciao paisà (D.V. More Record)
- 1990 – 14 successi (Duck Records)
- 1991 – Tutto Merola vol. 1 (Bideri)
- 1991 – Tutto Merola vol. 2 (Bideri)
- 1999 – Melodie napoletane (D.V. More Record)
- 2000 – Tutto Merola vol.1/I grandi classici (Bideri)
- 2000 – Tutto Merola vol.2/I grandi successi (Bideri)
- 2001 – Quattro mura (Raccolta)|Quattro mura (Fonotil)
- 2002 – Disco d'oro vol. 1 (D.V. More Record, MRCD 4269)
- 2002 – Disco d'oro vol. 2 (D.V. More Record, MRCD 4270)
- 2002 – Da Napoli con amore (D.V. More Record)
- 2003 – Malommo (Replay Music)
- 2003 – Napoli – Antologia della canzone napoletana (Retro Gold)
- 2003 – Monografie napoletane vol. 7 Mario Merola (Duck Records, GRCD-E 6365)
- 2003 – Monografie napoletane vol. 8 Mario Merola (Duck Records, GRCD-E 6366)
- 2003 – Monografie napoletane vol. 9 Mario Merola (Duck Records, GRCD-E 6367)
- 2003 – Cuore di Napoli (raccolta)|Cuore di Napoli (D.V. More Record)
- 2004 – Chella d' 'e rrose (D.V. More Record)
- 2004 – Mario Merola contiene medley (D.V. More Record)
- 2004 – Cient'anne (album)|Cient'anne (D.V. More Record)
- 2004 – Mario Merola – Storia della canzone napoletana (Retro Gold)
- 2004 – Mario Merola canta Napoli (Joker)
- 2005 – I protagonisti vol. 2 (D.V. More Record)
- 2005 – 'A peggio offesa sta 'ncoppa all'onore (Nuova Canaria)
- 2005 – Bella Napoli vol. 2 (D.V. More Record)
- 2005 – Numero 1 (Mario Merola)|Numero 1 (D.V. More Record)
- 2005 – Cinematografo (Doppio CD)|Cinematografo (MR. Music)
- 2005 – I miei festival di Napoli (Cristiani Music Italy)
- 2005 – Napoli ieri e oggi (Raccolta)|Napoli ieri e oggi (D.V. More Record)
- 2005 – 'A Fede (D.V. More Record)
- 2005 – Disco oro (MR Music)
- 2005 – Due in uno: La sceneggiata Mario Merola & Nino D'Angelo (Nuova Canaria)
- 2005 – Napoli (Mario Merola)|Napoli (D.V. More Record)
- 2005 – A città 'e Pulecenella – Tangentopoli (MR Music)
- 2005 – Collezione (Mario Merola)|Collezione (Disco Più)
- 2005 – Quatt'anne ammore (D.V. More Record)
- 2005 – O'Rre da sceneggiata (MR Music)
- 2005 – Napule ca se ne va (MR Music)
- 2005 – Mario Merola the classic collection (Azzurra Music)
- 2006 – Carosello napoletano (Raccolta)|Carosello napoletano (MR Music)
- 2006 – Giuramento (raccolta)|Giuramento (Duck Record)
- 2006 – Napoli prima e dopo 45 successi – Mario Merola, Nino D'Angelo, Gigi D'Alessio (D.V. More Record)
- 2006 – I grandi successi (Mario Merola)|I grandi successi (Music Time)
- 2006 – Bar Napoli (Mediane)
- 2007 – Core 'e Napule Mario Merola & Nino D'Angelo (Saar Srl, Cd 8525)
- 2007 – Antologia sonora della canzone napoletana – cofanetto 2 (Phonotype, SFN3 2072)
- 2007 – Antologia sonora della canzone napoletana – cofanetto 3 (Phonotype, SFN3 2073)
- 2007 – Antologia sonora della canzone napoletana – cofanetto 4 (Phonotype, SFN3 2074)
- 2007 – Antologia sonora della canzone napoletana – cofanetto 5 (Phonotype, SFN3 2075)
- 2007 – Antologia sonora della canzone napoletana – cofanetto 7 (Phonotype, SFN3 2077)
- 2007 – Antologia sonora della canzone napoletana – cofanetto 8 (Phonotype, SFN3 2078)
- 2007 – Antologia sonora della canzone napoletana – cofanetto 9 (Phonotype, SFN3 2079)
- 2007 – Antologia sonora della canzone napoletana – cofanetto 13 (Phonotype, SFN3 2083)
- 2007 – Antologia sonora della canzone napoletana – cofanetto 14 (Phonotype, SFN3 2084)
- 2007 – Antologia sonora della canzone napoletana – cofanetto 15 (Phonotype, SFN3 2085)
- 2008 – 'A collezione 1 – 'O mare 'e margellina (Zeus Record, ZS 0052)
- 2008 – 'A collezione 2 – 'A sciurara (Zeus Record, ZS 0222)
- 2008 – 'A collezione 3 – Malommo (Zeus Record, ZS 2062)
- 2008 – 'A collezione 4 – Surriento d' 'e nnammurate (Zeus Record, ZS 2112)
- 2008 – 'A collezione 5 – Fantasia (Zeus Record, ZS 2122)
- 2008 – 'A collezione 6 – Comm' 'a 'nu sciummo (Zeus Record, ZS 2132)
- 2008 – Gli Indimenticabili vol. 2 Mario Merola (Nuova Canaria)
- 2008 – Malu Figlio – Mario Merola & Pino Marchese (Nuova Canaria)
- 2008 – Amori e tradimenti (Nuova Canaria)
- 2008 – So' nnato carcerato (Nuova Canaria)
- 2009 – La tradizione. La sceneggiata (Lucky Planets)
- 2009 – I miei successi (Mario Merola)|I miei successi (Zeus Record)
- 2010 – Canta Napoli 10 (Joker)
- 2010 – Il meglio di Mario Merola (Joker)
- 2010 – Senza guapparia (Fonotil)
- 2010 – Cinematografo (album)|Cinematografo (Phonotype, CD 0240)
- 2011 – Viva Napoli vol. 3 (Phonotype, CD 0035)
- 2013 – Le sceneggiate di Mario Merola (Replay Music)

=== Individual ===
- 1992 – Cient'Anne (with Gigi D'Alessio)
- 1992 – Futtetènne (with Cristiano Malgioglio)
- 2001 – Ll'urdemo emigrante (with Francesco Merola)
- 2002 – Si tu papà (with Cinzia Oscar)
- 2002 – Mamma de vicule (with Giovanna De Sio)
- 2004 – Get another rum (with I Corleone)
- 2004 – E' figli 'e Napule (with Antonio Ottaiano)
- 2005 – Cu' mme (with Rita Siani)

== Filmography ==
- Sgarro alla camorra (1973)
- L'ultimo guappo by Alfonso Brescia (1978)
- Napoli... serenata calibro 9 (1978)
- Il mammasantissima (1979)
- From Corleone to Brooklyn (Da Corleone a Brooklyn) (1979)
- The New Godfathers (I contrabbandieri di Santa Lucia) (1979)
- Hunted City (Sbirro, la tua legge è lenta... la mia no!) (1979)
- Napoli... la camorra sfida e la città risponde (1979)
- Zappatore (1980)
- La tua vita per mio figlio (1980)
- Carcerato (1981)
- The Mafia Triangle (Napoli, Palermo, New York – Il triangolo della camorra) (1981)
- Lacrime napulitane (1981)
- I figli... so' pezzi 'e core (1981)
- Tradimento (1982)
- Giuramento (1982)
- Torna, regia di Stelvio Massi (1984)
- Guapparia, regia di Stelvio Massi (1984)
- Corsia preferenziale, TV film (1995)
- Un posto al sole, TV series (1996)
- Cient'anne (1999)
- Sud Side Stori (2000)
- Totò Sapore e la magica storia della pizza, animated film (2003)
