= Giacomo Rondinella =

Italian singer and actor

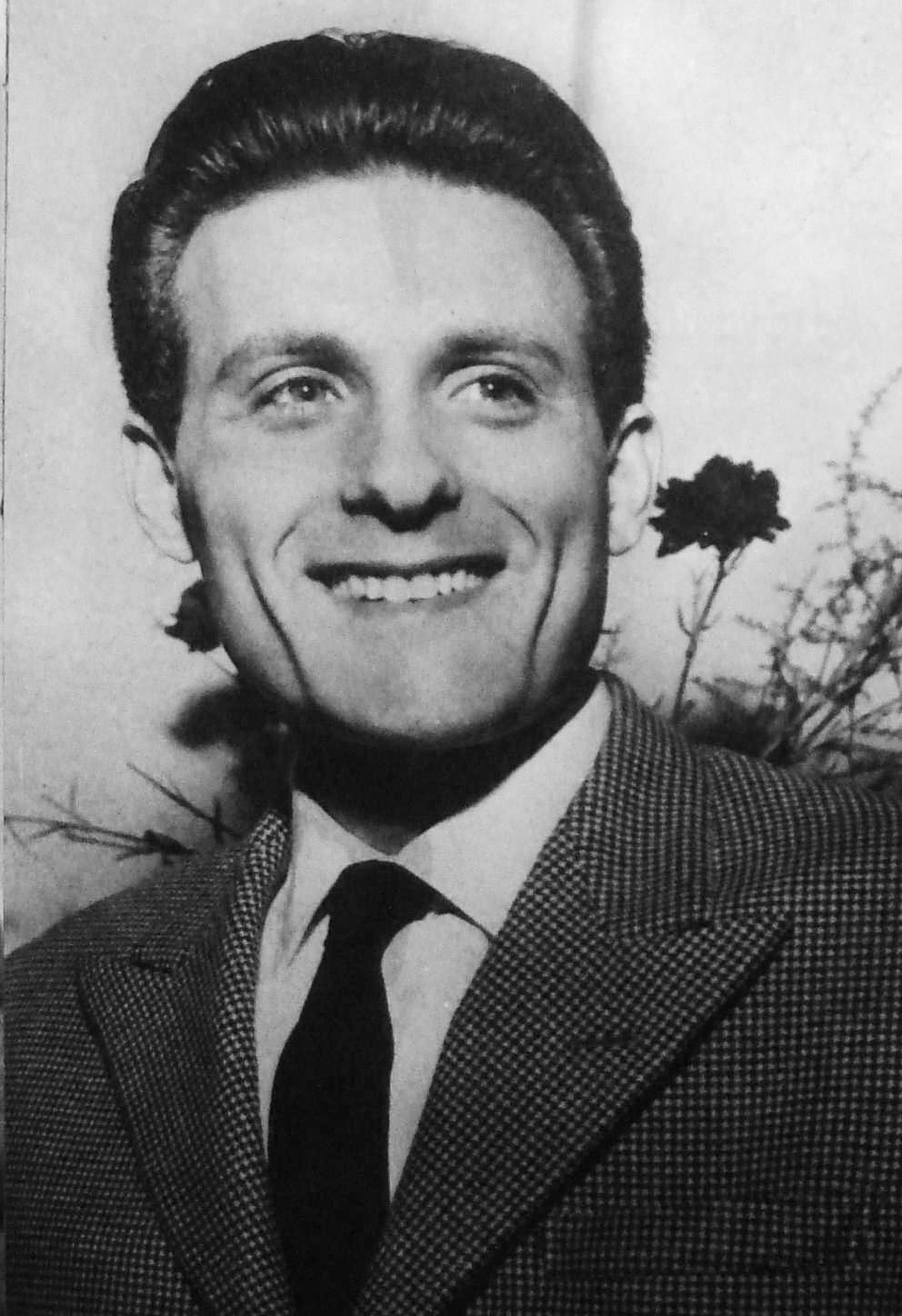
- Born: 30 August 1923; Messina, Sicily, Kingdom of Italy
- Died: 25 February 2015 (aged 91); Fonte Nuova, Lazio, Italy
- Occupations: Singer; actor

Giacomo Rondinella (30 August 1923 – 25 February 2015) was an Italian singer and actor.

== Life and career ==
Born in Messina, the son of a couple of Neapolitan actors and singers, Rondinella started his career as a singer after World War II, following failed attempts to pursue a military career and a career as a boxer. He first emerged as the winner of a contest for "New Voices" organized by Radio Napoli, and in a short time he became one of the stars of Canzone Napoletana. A real-life friend of Totò and Eduardo De Filippo, Rondinella also had a prolific career as a stage and film actor, with a peak in the first half of the 1950s. His younger brother Luciano also had a career of actor and singer.

== Selected filmography ==
- Fire Over the Sea (1947)
- Naples Sings (1953)
- Letter from Naples (1954)
- Farewell, My Beautiful Lady (1954)
- Sunset in Naples (1955)
