= Libero Bovio =

Italian lyricist and dialect poet (1883–1942)

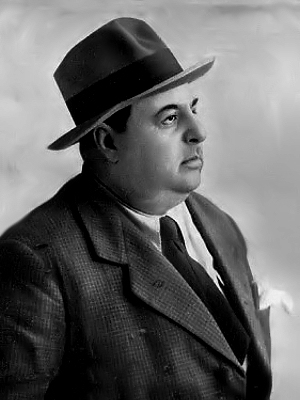
Libero Bovio

Libero Bovio (9 June 1883 – 26 May 1942) was a Neapolitan lyricist and dialect poet.

Bovio was one of those responsible for the rejuvenation of Neapolitan dialect in plays, poetry and song at the beginning of the twentieth century. He took odd jobs at newspapers and then went to work in the export office of the National Museum. He then became director of Canzonetta a small publishing concern dedicated to the music of Naples. A collection of his dialect comedies was published in 1923, and his collected poems appeared in 1928. He is primarily remembered for his lyrics to some 600 Neapolitan songs, set to the music of prominent Neapolitan songwriters of his day. Among his best remembered lyrics are Reginella, "Passione", 'O paese d' 'o sole and, in 1925, Lacreme napulitane, a song that describes the drama of the immigrant Neapolitan in America.
