= Luciano Rondinella =

Italian singer and actor (died 2020)

- Died: 27 June 2020
- Occupation(s): Singer, actor
- Relatives: Giacomo Rondinella (brother)

Luciano Rondinella (died 27 June 2020) was an Italian singer and actor.
