= Nino D'Angelo =

- Nino D'Angelo in 2025

Background information
- Born: Gaetano D'Angelo; 21 June 1957 (age 69); Naples, Italy
- Genres: Pop; neomelodic pop; folk-pop; canzone napoletana
- Occupations: Singer; actor; television personality; film director; screenwriter; author; composer
- Instrument: Vocals
- Years active: 1970s–present
- Labels: Sony BMG, Casa Ricordi
- Website: www.ninodangelo.com

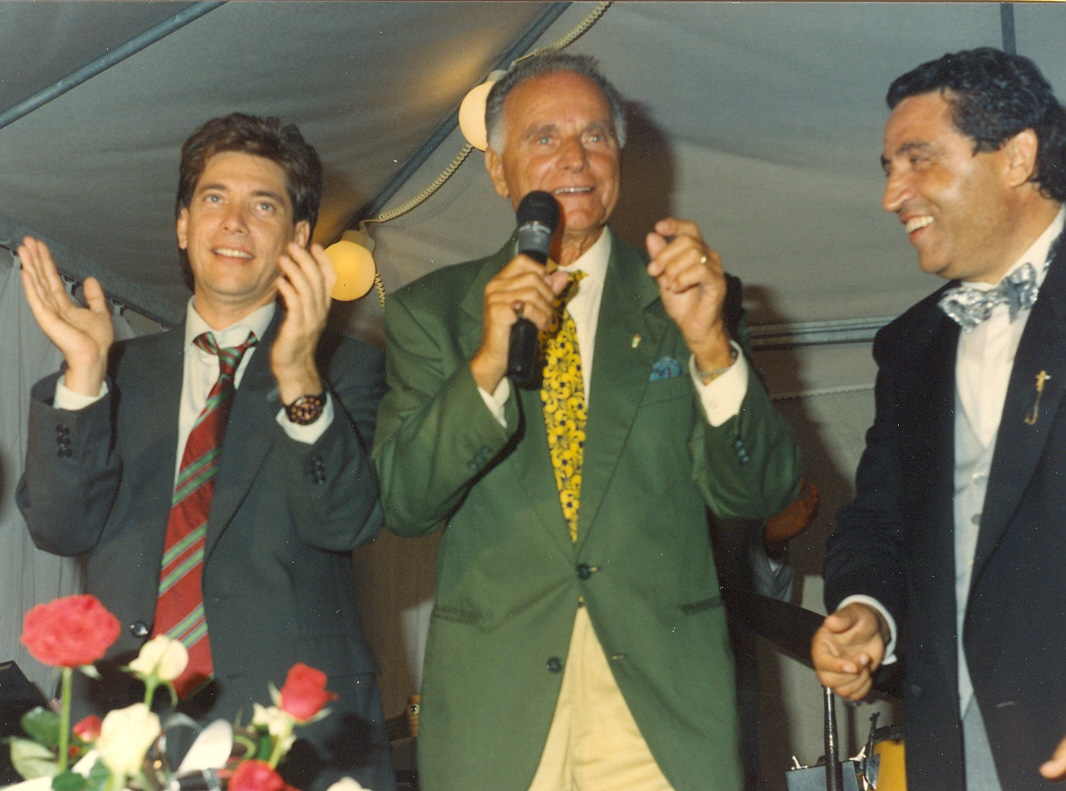
Nino D'Angelo, Alberto Amato and Mario Trevi in 1992

Gaetano "Nino" D'Angelo (born 21 June 1957) is an Italian singer, songwriter, actor, television personality, film director, screenwriter and author.

He was born to a poor family in San Pietro a Patierno, a suburb of Naples, and dropped out of school, taking jobs like ice cream vendor and wedding singer.

His first album, A storia mia (Neapolitan: "My Story") was received very well, especially in Sicily. In 1979, he married Annamaria, with whom he had two sons. He started a career as an actor in sceneggiate musical dramas, a genre native to Naples, and later as a cinema actor. His first film was Celebrità, released in 1981, a star vehicle written around his singing and the first of five films he acted in that were directed or produced by Ninì Grassia.

In 1982, he released the album Un jeans e una maglietta ("Jeans and a T-shirt") and a film with the same title. The album sold over one million copies and the film surpassed the Hollywood movie Flashdance at the box office. He participated in the Sanremo Music Festival in 1986 with the song "Vai" ("Go"). His album Cantautore was the best seller at the time, although it was not listed in the official Hit Parade. He performed in Australia, Germany, Switzerland, the United States, and France—where he debuted on 15 December 1987 at the Olympia in Paris.

In 1990, following the deaths of both his parents, he released the album "Tiempo" (Neapolitan for "Time"), which was championed by Italian music critic Goffredo Fofi.

In 1997, he wrote his first musical, Core pazzo ("Mad Heart"), and co-hosted the Dopofestival show that aired immediately after each night of the Sanremo Music Festival with Piero Chiambretti. He also won the David Di Donatello Award for Best Music for his soundtrack to the film To Die for Tano. In 2000, he also starred, directed, wrote and performed the music for Aitanic, a Titanic parody and starring fellow Italian actors Sabina Began and Giacomo Rizzo.

The following year, he competed in the Sanremo Festival, singing "Senza giacca e cravatta" ("Without Suit and Tie") and reaching 8th place. He also took part in Sanremo in 2002 and 2003 with the songs "Mari'" and "'A Storia 'E Nisciuno" (Neapolitan for "Nobody's Story"). In 2003 he sang in Brașov, Romania, and appeared in the film Incantato directed by Pupi Avati, which he won a Flaiano Prize for Best Supporting Actor. He was popular with teenagers in the 1970s and into the 1980s, charting Billboard several times. In 2008, he also starred in a film directed and written by his son, Toni.

In 2013, he was one of the protesters after the mafia dumped toxic waste across the country, including Naples.

Nino D'Angelo is Roman Catholic.

Camorra repentant Luigi Giuliano stated that D’Angelo success was initially funded by his clan.

== Filmography ==
- Celebrità (1981)
- Tradimento (1982)
- Giuramento (1982)
- L'Ave Maria (1982)
- Lo studente (1983)
- Un jeans e una maglietta (1983)
- La discoteca (1983)
- L'ammiratrice (1983)
- Uno scugnizzo a New York (1984)
- Popcorn e patatine (1985)
- Giuro che ti amo (1986)
- Fotoromanzo (1986)
- Quel ragazzo della curva B (1987)
- La ragazza del metrò (1988)
- Fatalità (1991)
- Attenti a noi due (1994)
- To Die for Tano (1997)
- Paparazzi (1998)
- Ama il tuo nemico (1999)
- Tifosi (1999)
- Vacanze di Natale 2000 (1999)
- Aitanic (2000)
- Il cuore altrove (2003)
- 4-4-2 - Il gioco più bello del mondo (2006)
- Una notte (2007), credited as Toni D'Angelo

== Discography ==
- 'A storia mia ('O Scippo) (1976)
- Nino D'Angelo vol.2 (1977)
- Nino D'Angelo vol.3 (1978)
- Celebrità (1980)
- 'A discoteca (1981)
- Le due facce di Nino D'Angelo:Storia – Core 'e papà (1982)
- Un jeans 'e 'na maglietta (1982)
- Sotto 'e stelle (1983)
- Forza campione (1983)
- Nino D'Angelo (1984)
- Eccomi qua (1985)
- Cantautore (1986)
- Fotografando l'amore (1986)
- Cose di cuore (1987)
- Le canzoni che cantava mammà (1988)
- Il cammino dell'amore (1988)
- Inseparabili (1989)
- Amo l'estate (1990)
- ...e la vita continua (1991)
- Bravo ragazzo (1992)
- ...Tiempo (1993)
- Musicammore (1994)
- A neve 'e 'o sole (1995)
- A 'nu passo d"a città (1997)
- Stella 'e matina (1999)
- Terranera (2001)
- La festa (2002)
- 'O schiavo 'e 'o rre (2003)
- Senza giacca e cravatta (2004) – Romanian only release
- Il ragu' con la guerra (2005)
- Gioia Nova (2007)
- D'Angelo cantabruni (2008)
- Jammo jà (2010)
- Tra terra e stelle (2012)
