= Valentina (1989 TV series) =

- Genre: Erotic thriller
- Based on: Valentina by Guido Crepax
- Starring: Demetra Hampton; Russel Case; Antonello Fassari; Mary Sellers
- Theme music composer: Fio Zanotti
- Opening theme: "Valentina"
- Composer: Fio Zanotti
- Country of origin: Italy
- Original language: Italian
- No. of seasons: 1
- No. of episodes: 13 (list of episodes)

Production
- Executive producer: Roberto Cacciaguerra
- Producers: Angelo Rizzoli, Jr.
- Production locations: Milan; Barcelona
- Running time: 30 minutes

Original release
- Network: Italia 1
- Release: September 29 – December 22, 1989

Valentina is an Italian erotic thriller television series that originally aired on Italia 1 from September 29 to December 22, 1989. It is based on the Valentina comics series by Italian artist Guido Crepax. The series follows a Milanese photographer, Valentina Rosselli, and her investigations assisted by the antiquarian Phillip Rembrant, with whom she shares an ambiguous relationship.

Despite being shot in Italian language, the actors were dubbed over by different people. Demetra Hampton was voiced by Claudia Balboni and Russel Case by Dario Penne. The entire series was dubbed into English for syndication in other countries, and scenes from six episodes were edited into a feature-length film version which aired on Showtime and Cinemax in their late night programming blocks.

== Production ==
Created by Gianfranco Manfredi, the series is based on the Valentina comics by Italian artist Guido Crepax. It was co-produced between France and Spain. Among the thirteen episodes, there were only two directors: Gianfranco Giagni and Giandomenico Curi. Despite being shot in Italian language, the actors were dubbed over by different people. Demetra Hampton was voiced by Claudia Balboni and Russel Case by Dario Penne. The creator of the original comic book series Crepax later commented he found the series well scripted but thought the role of Valentina was not suited for Hampton. She was given the role after being scouted on her vacation in Los Angeles. The agent saw Hampton, took photos of her and sent them to the producer Angelo Rizzoli. Hampton was sent to Milan the next day and was immediately cast in role of Valentina. Crepax was unsatisfied with the producer's choice since he wanted the girl who would portray Valentina to be Italian, not American.

The first episode, "Baba Yaga" is a remake of Crepax's original story. It had been previously made into a film, Baba Yaga (1973), directed by Corrado Farina.

== Cast ==
- Demetra Hampton as Valentina Rosselli
- Russel Case as Phillip Rembrant
- Antonello Fassari as Checco
- Mary Sellers as Anita
- Kim Rossi Stuart as Bruno
- Regina Rodriguez as Tony
- Isabelle Illiers as Effie
- Assumpta Serna as Baba Yaga

== Episodes ==
| No. | Title | Original title | Directed by | Written by | Original release date |
|---|---|---|---|---|---|
| 1 | "Baba Yaga" | "Baba Yaga" | Gianfranco Giagni | Gianfranco Manfredi & Gianfranco Giagni | September 29, 1989 |
| 2 | "Violoncello" | "Violoncello" | Giandomenico Curi | Gianfranco Manfredi & Giandomenico Curi | October 6, 1989 |
| 3 | "Jack Loves Lulu" | "Jack ama Lulu" | Gianfranco Giagni | Gianfranco Manfredi & Gianfranco Giagni | October 13, 1989 |
| 4 | "Valentina Doesn't Rest" | "Valentina non riposa" | Gianfranco Giagni | Gianfranco Manfredi & Gianfranco Giagni | October 20, 1989 |
| 5 | "For the Love of Valentina" | "Per amore di Valentina" | Giandomenico Curi | Gianfranco Manfredi & Giandomenico Curi | October 27, 1989 |
| 6 | "Butterflies" | "Farfalle" | Gianfranco Giagni | Gianfranco Manfredi & Gianfranco Giagni | November 3, 1989 |
| 7 | "The Last Photo" | "Fotofinish" | Giandomenico Curi | Gianfranco Manfredi & Giandomenico Curi | November 10, 1989 |
| 8 | "The Others" | "L'altra" | Giandomenico Curi | Gianfranco Manfredi & Giandomenico Curi | November 17, 1989 |
| 9 | "Rembrant and Witches" | "Rembrant e le streghe" | Gianfranco Giagni | Gianfranco Manfredi & Gianfranco Giagni | November 24, 1989 |
| 10 | "Murderous Valentina" | "Valentina assassina" | Gianfranco Giagni | Gianfranco Manfredi & Gianfranco Giagni | December 1, 1989 |
| 11 | "Fallen Angels" | "Caduta angeli" | Giandomenico Curi | Gianfranco Manfredi & Giandomenico Curi | December 8, 1989 |
| 12 | "Hello Valentina" | "Ciao Valentina" | Giandomenico Curi | Gianfranco Manfredi & Giandomenico Curi | December 15, 1989 |
| 13 | "Goodbye Valentina" | "Addio Valentina" | Giandomenico Curi | Gianfranco Manfredi & Giandomenico Curi | December 22, 1989 |

== See also ==
- List of Italian television series
