= Valentina (Italian comics) =

Italian comic strip series

Valentina with her Hasselblad camera

Valentina is an Italian comic strip series, created in 1965 by the Italian artist Guido Crepax and concluded in 1996.

Originally a minor character working for the comic hero Neutron, Valentina became the sole protagonist of the series in 1967. The first episode was entitled "La Curva di Lesmo" (referring to a curve of the Italian Formula 1 Grand Prix of Monza). This story was followed by 30 others, collected in a total of seven books, along with two others Lanterna magica (Magic Lantern, 1977) and Valentina pirata (Pirate Valentina), the first in full colour.

== Character ==
Valentina Rosselli, whose appearance is inspired by silent film actress Louise Brooks, is a Milanese photojournalist. Her boyfriend, Philip Rembrandt, the super-hero Neutron, has the ability to paralyze people, animals, or machines he has seen in the flesh or pictures. Later a child was born to Philip and Valentina, Mattia.

The character Valentina was born on December 25, 1942, in Milan and grew older during the series, the last episode of which was published in 1995.

Valentina became increasingly an erotic comic book

As time passed, in Valentina's stories Crepax abandoned the fantasy-science fiction or detective themes of the beginning, introducing a complex, weird mix of erotism, hallucinations, and dreams. The strips also dealt with bisexuality, autoerotic ecstasy, super-sensual abandon, and sadomasochism.

== Valentina in other media ==
In 1973 a feature film called Baba Yaga was based on the comic book. Valentina was played by French actress Isabelle De Funès. The film was directed by Corrado Farina, who had previously made a documentary on the comics by Guido Crepax.

An Italian TV series based on the comicbook was released in 1989. Valentina was played by American actress Demetra Hampton and Philip Rembrandt by Russel Case. Thirteen episodes were filmed, with language tracks in both Italian and English, each 30 minutes long. Selected episodes were edited together into a feature film and shown on late-night American Cable TV.

== Stories ==
Valentina in one of her dreams

- The Lesmo Curve (1965)
- The Subterraneans (1965; revised in 1968)
- The Descent (1966)
- Un Poco Loco (1966)
- Ciao, Valentina (1966)
- The Force of Gravity (1967)
- Funny Valentine (1967)
- Prelude to The Subterraneans (The Hussars of Death) (1968)
- Valentina in Sovietland (1968)
- Valentina in Boots (1968)
- Marianna in the Country (1968)
- Fearless Paper Doll Valentina (1968)
- Filippo and Valentina (1969)
- Valentina's Baby (1969)
- The Manuscript Found in a Stroller (1970)
- Baba Yaga (1971)
- Bluebeard (1971)
- Who's Afraid of Baba Yaga? (1971)
- Valentina the Fearless (1971)
- Annette (1972)
- The Little King (1972)
- Pietro Giacomo Rogeri (1972)
- The Time Eater (1973)
- Fallen Angels (1973)
- The Empress's New Clothes (1973)
- Viva Trotsky (1974)
- Reflection (1974)
- Private Life (1975)
- Blindman's Bluff (1975)
- In the Metro (1975)
- Valentina the Assassin? (1975)
- Subconscious Valentina (1976)
- Valentina the Pirate (1976)
- Magic Lantern (1976)
- Rembrandt and the Witches (1977)
- Anthropology (1977)
- Le Zattere, Venice (1980)
- Nostalgia (1980)
- Silent Alphabet (1980)
- Story of a Story (1981)
- Made in Germany (1981)
- Mrs. Rosselli and Miss Lang (1982)
- Andante (1982)
- Nobody (1986)
- Far from Berlin (1988)
- The Thieving Magpie (1989)
- Accute Observations (1989)
