= Quando la coppia scoppia =

- Directed by: Steno
- Written by: Steno; Gianfranco Manfredi; Ottavio Jemma
- Starring: Enrico Montesano; Claude Brasseur; Dalila Di Lazzaro
- Cinematography: Luigi Kuveiller
- Edited by: Raimondo Crociani
- Music by: Piero Umiliani
- Distributed by: Medusa Distribuzione
- Release date: 1981
- Language: Italian

Quando la coppia scoppia is a 1981 Italian comedy film directed by Steno. It reproposes the couple formed by Enrico Montesano and Claude Brasseur, who had successfully starred in the two years older comedy film Aragosta a colazione.

== Cast ==
- Enrico Montesano: Enrico Granata
- Claude Brasseur: Piergiorgio Funari
- Dalila Di Lazzaro: Angela
- Lia Tanzi: Rossana
- Daniela Poggi: Mara
- Marta Zoffoli: Anna
- Franco Caracciolo: Pedrozzi
- Gigi Reder: Piergiorgio Martini
- Ugo Bologna: Father of Enrico
- Giorgio Bracardi: Armani
