= Febbre da cavallo – La mandrakata =

2002 film by Carlo Vanzina

- Directed by: Carlo Vanzina
- Written by: Franco Amurri; Enrico Vanzina; Carlo Vanzina
- Starring: Gigi Proietti; Enrico Montesano; Rodolfo Laganà; Andrea Ascolese; Nancy Brilli; Carlo Buccirosso
- Cinematography: Claudio Zamarion
- Music by: Franco Bixio; Fabio Frizzi; Vince Tempera
- Distributed by: Warner Bros. Italia
- Release date: 2002
- Country: Italy
- Language: Italian

Febbre da cavallo – La mandrakata is a 2002 Italian comedy film written and directed by Carlo Vanzina and starring Gigi Proietti. It is the sequel of the 1976 comedy film Febbre da cavallo.

For his performance in this film, Gigi Proietti won the Nastro d'Argento for Best Actor.

== Plot ==
Despite the end of his marriage and the promise to his new girlfriend Lauretta to close the racetracks, Bruno Fioretti known as "Mandrake" has not lost the habit of playing horses. In fact, he continues undeterred to bet together with his new partners: "Big cat", an unemployed 40-year-old who still lives with his parents from whom he steals money for bets, and the "Engineer", an out-of-course law student. The three, after an excellent start due to the computer skills of the engineer, systematically start losing again, until one day, during a race, Mandrake notices that a horse that always comes last, named "Come va va", is aesthetically identical to Pokémon, a multi-winning horse owned by Count De Blasi. At that point he conceives a scam of his own: bought cheaply "How's it going", he secretly swaps the two horses in order to raise Pokémon's prices, making the jerk run and lose in his place. Aurelia, a former flame of Mandrake, and the accountant Antonio Faiella, a Neapolitan cheated by Mandrake, are also involved in the scam.

Once the exchange has been made, Mandrake and associates must obtain the money for the bet. To help Mandrake comes his former partner Armando, known as "Er Pomata", who everyone believed dead and instead had fled to Australia to escape creditors. With his help, Mandrake and his associates set up a scam against the butcher's son "Manzotin", but they manage to take away only a thousand euros.

To obtain an adequate sum of money, Cozzaro Nero is then cheated, thanks to the double game of Aurelia who reveals to the loan shark the scam engineered by Mandrake and convinces him to bet 25,000 euros on Pokémon at the next race, and then divides the proceeds to the 50%. But in reality the others have made a fake exchange of the horses, so the horse is still running, which of course loses. With a stratagem, the 25,000 euros of the bet end up in the hands of Mandrake, who has, in the meantime, registered the horse in another race in Montecatini.

Obviously by running Pokémon in its place, the race is easily won by Mandrake's horse, but Count De Blasi, using a private investigator, has in the meantime discovered everything, so Mandrake and associates avoid the complaint, but find themselves without even the money to return to Rome. Forced to get off the train at the first station, Mandrake and Pomata find themselves in front of a booth with the game of three cards: the two end up playing each other, losing it, the last thing left: the gold watch of the First Communion that Aurelia had given shortly before in Mandrake.

== Cast ==
- Gigi Proietti as Bruno "Mandrake" Fioretti
- Enrico Montesano as Armando "Er Pomata" Pellicci
- Carlo Buccirosso as Antonio Faiella
- Nancy Brilli as Aurelia
- Rodolfo Laganà as Marco aka "Micione"
- Andrea Ascolese as "The Engineer"
- Emanuela Grimalda as Lauretta

== See also ==
- List of Italian films of 2002
- List of films about horses
- List of films about horse racing
