= Renato Mori =

Italian actor (1935–2014)

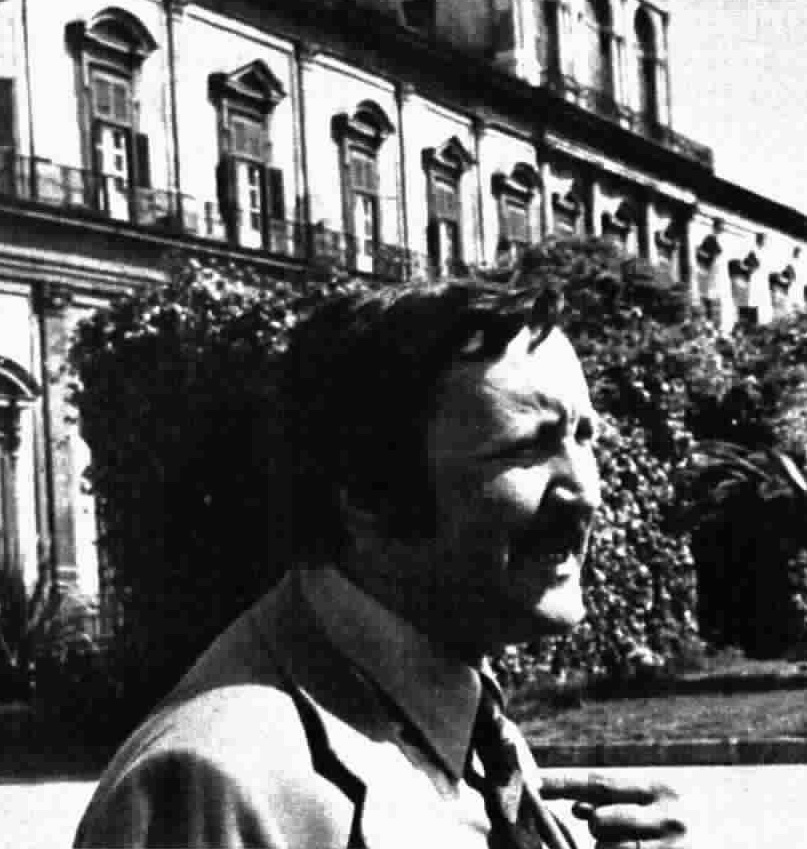
- Mori in Il marsigliese (1975)
- Born: Renato Pietro Mori; 29 May 1935; Milan, Italy
- Died: 22 August 2014 (aged 79); Rome, Italy
- Occupations: Actor; voice actor; dubbing director
- Years active: 1962–2011
- Children: Simone Mori

Renato Pietro Mori (29 May 1935 – 22 August 2014) was an Italian actor and voice actor.

== Biography ==
Mori was born in Milan in 1935. He started his career in the 1950s, appearing on several television series and acting on stage. Starting from the 1970s, he was often cast in roles of inspectors, police commissioners and men in uniform in poliziotteschi and crime films and TV-series, notably Il marsigliese and La piovra.

Mori was also very active as a voice actor and a dubber. A co-founder of Sefit, the largest Italian company of dubbing, he was the official Italian voice of Morgan Freeman as well as often dubbing James Earl Jones and John Rhys-Davies, among other actors. He also substituted for his colleague Sergio Fiorentini as the Italian voice of Gene Hackman.

=== Personal life ===
Mori was the father of Simone Mori, who is also an actor and voice actor.

== Death ==
Mori died in Rome on 22 August 2014, at the age of 79, after a long illness which caused him to retire from his career since 2011.

== Partial filmography ==
- Sword of the Conqueror (1961)
- Uno dei tre (1972)
- E cominciò il viaggio nella vertigine (1974) – Lepa
- Bruciati da cocente passione (1976)
- Free Hand for a Tough Cop (1976)
- Lobster for Breakfast (1979) – Sommelier
- Assassinio sul Tevere (1979) – commissioner Galbiati
- I Hate Blondes (1980) – Literary Agent
- Delitti, amore e gelosia (1982)
- Pizza Connection (1985) – Commissioner Giovanni Astarita
- Voyage à Rome (1992) – Le contrôleur (uncredited)
- Power and Lovers (1994) – Turi
- Banditi (1995) – Karl
- Cuore di donna (2002)

== Dubbing roles ==
=== Animation ===
- John Silver in Treasure Planet
- Colonel Hathi in The Jungle Book 2, Jungle Cubs
- Looking Glass in Happily Ever After
- Black Rabbit in Watership Down
- Robot Santa in Futurama: Bender's Big Score
- Gordy in Open Season
- Long John Silver in The Pagemaster
- Wylie Burp in An American Tail: Fievel Goes West
- Chef in South Park, South Park: Bigger, Longer & Uncut
- Zed in Men in Black: The Series
- Cornelius in Once Upon a Forest
- Theseus in Midsummer Dream
- Rudnick in Heavy Metal (1996 redub)
- Norman in Raw Toonage, Marsupilami

=== Live action ===
- Jorge de Burgos in The Name of the Rose
- A.Z. Drones in Johnny Handsome
- Eddie "Scrap-Iron" Dupris in Million Dollar Baby
- God in Bruce Almighty
- William Somerset in Seven
- Harry Stevenson in Feast of Love
- William Cabot in The Sum of All Fears
- Carter Chambers in The Bucket List
- John Rawlins in Glory
- Nelson Mandela in Invictus
- Leonard White in The Bonfire of the Vanities
- Billy Ford in Outbreak
- Hibble in Moll Flanders
- Alex Cross in Kiss the Girls, Along Came a Spider
- Lucius Fox in Batman Begins, The Dark Knight
- Theodore Joadson in Amistad
- Jim in Hard Rain
- Tom Beck in Deep Impact
- Victor Benezet in Under Suspicion
- Charlie in Nurse Betty
- Charlie Grimes in High Crimes
- Abraham Curtis in Dreamcatcher
- Miles Evans in Levity
- Walter Crewes in The Big Bounce
- Sam in Unleashed
- Moses Ashford in Edison
- Mitch Bradley in An Unfinished Life
- The Boss in Lucky Number Slevin
- Morgan Freeman in 10 Items or Less
- Narrator in The Love Guru
- Harry Caul in The Conversation
- Roy Tucker in The Domino Principle
- John Herod in The Quick and the Dead
- William Sherman Foster in March or Die
- Johnny Gallagher in The Package
- Max Millan in Scarecrow
- Kibby Womack in Lucky Lady
- Pete Van Wherry in Reds
- Harry Moseby in Night Moves
- Jimmy "Popeye" Doyle in French Connection II
- George Crook in Geronimo: An American Legend
- Avery Tolar in The Firm
- Lowell Kolchek in Postcards from the Edge
- MacArthur Stern in Loose Cannons
- Nicholas Porter Earp in Wyatt Earp
- James Greer in The Hunt for Red October, Patriot Games, Clear and Present Danger
- Bernard Abbott in Sneakers
- "Goody" Nelson in Gardens of Stone
- John Dolby in Clean Slate
- Terence Mann in Field of Dreams
- Roscoe Jenkins Sr. in Welcome Home Roscoe Jenkins
- Quint in Jaws
- Doyle Lonnegan in The Sting
- Sallah in Indiana Jones and the Raiders of the Lost Ark, Indiana Jones and the Last Crusade
- Gimli in The Lord of the Rings: The Fellowship of the Ring, The Lord of the Rings: The Return of the King
- Leonid Pushkin in The Living Daylights
- Viscount Mabrey in The Princess Diaries 2: Royal Engagement
- Will Teasle in First Blood
- Dennis Meechum in Best Seller
- Raymond Horgan in Presumed Innocent
- Father Kelly in Stolen Summer
- Jasper O'Shea in Assault on Precinct 13
- Ross Maclure in The Presidio
- Al Grossman in Night and the City
- Moe in Guilty as Sin
- Saul Tuttle in While You Were Sleeping
- Eddie Davers in Bulworth
- Pops McKenna in Dirty Work
- Bill Devaney in The Bodyguard
- Speet in First Kid
- Jim Toller in Enough
- Cobb in Hard Luck
- Mr. Stewart in The Search for Santa Paws
- Joe Leon in The Specialist
- Mr. Hammerman in Carpool
- Father Kovak in End of Days
- Louis Mead in Crazy in Alabama
- Guy Banister in JFK
- Ted Marx in Switched at Birth
- Santa Claus in Elf
- Sam Baines in Back to the Future
- George C. Marshall in Saving Private Ryan
- Bookseller in Oliver Twist
- Chief Zed in Men in Black, Men in Black II
- Perry White in Superman IV: The Quest for Peace
- Aragog in Harry Potter and the Chamber of Secrets
- Agent Bilkins in The Fast and the Furious, 2 Fast 2 Furious
- Hulk in The Incredible Hulk
- Leo Dalcò in 1900
- Crowning in Once Upon a Time in America
- K. Edgar Singer in Muppets from Space
- Charles Wheeler in Philadelphia
- Earl Partridge in Magnolia
- R.K. Maroon in Who Framed Roger Rabbit
- James Morse in Pretty Woman
- Jack Dragna in Bugsy
- Ghost of Christmas Past in Scrooged
- Tom Broadbent in Cape Fear
- David Kibner in Invasion of the Body Snatchers
