= Piedipiatti =

- Directed by: Carlo Vanzina
- Written by: Carlo Vanzina; Enrico Vanzina; Leo Benvenuti; Piero De Bernardi
- Produced by: Mario Cecchi Gori; Vittorio Cecchi Gori
- Starring: Renato Pozzetto; Enrico Montesano
- Cinematography: Luigi Kuveiller
- Distributed by: Variety Distribution
- Release date: October 3, 1991
- Running time: 88 minutes
- Country: Italy
- Language: Italian
- Box office: $3.3 million (Italy)

Piedipiatti (lit. 'Flatfoot', also known as Cops) is a 1991 Italian comedy film directed by Carlo Vanzina.

== Plot ==
Italian cops investigate a drug traffic ring between Italy and Colombia. They have to find out who is the mysterious Italian criminal called “the American” who is making a deal with overseas organized crime.

== Cast ==
- Renato Pozzetto as Silvio Camurati
- Enrico Montesano as Vasco Sacchetti
- Anna Benny as Maria Grazia
- Antonio Ballerio as Aldo Rotelli
- Victor Cavallo as Sergio Proietti
- Francesco De Rosa as Tarallo
- Angelo Bernabucci as Angelo Bertoli
- Norman Sanny as Carlos
- Pino Ammendola as Chief Inspector
- Mirella Falco as Signora Motta
- Roberto Della Casa as Questore of Milan
- Giorgio Trestini as Armando Mainardi
- Terry Schiavo as Laura
