= Simone Mori =

Simone Mori may refer to:

- Simone Mori (cyclist)
- Simone Mori (voice actor)
