= Isabelle de Funès =

French actress (born 1944)

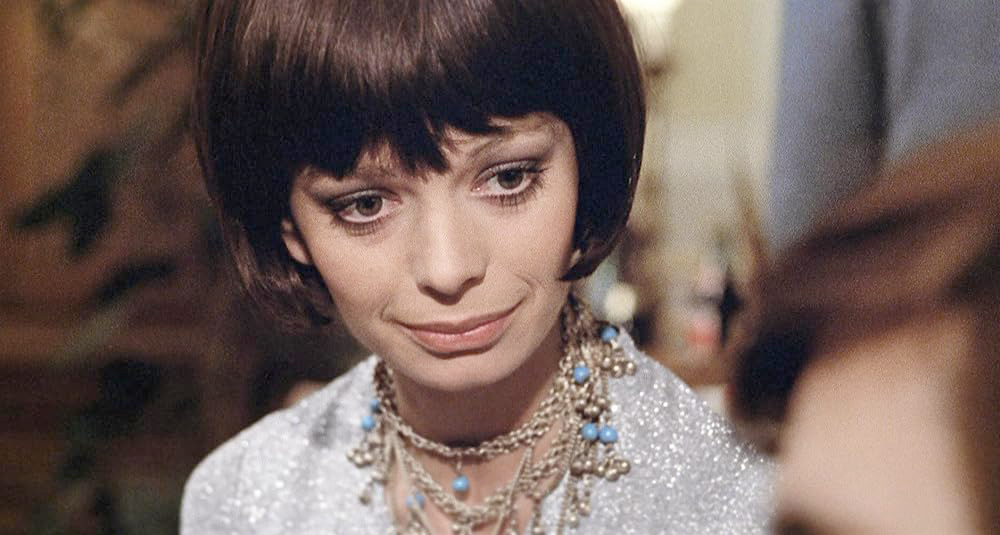
- Isabelle de Funès in Baba Yaga, 1973
- Born: Isabelle Christine Inès Léonore Girard; July 27, 1944 (age 82); Paris, France
- Occupations: Actress, singer, model, photographer
- Years active: 1968–present
- Spouse: Michel Duchaussoy (m. 1970–1971)
- Children: 1

Isabelle Christine Inès Léonore Girard (born July 27, 1944), better known by the name Isabelle de Funès, is a French actress, singer, model and photographer. She is best known for her portrayal of Guido Crepax's comic book character Valentina in the erotic thriller, Baba Yaga (1973).

== Biography ==
Born in Paris, De Funès began her career as a model. In 1968, she met the singer-songwriters, Véronique Sanson and Michel Berger. Together they recorded several singles and an EP, La Journée D'Isabelle (1968). She made her screen debut in the French film, Ces messieurs de la gâchette (1970). After working on the film Le coup monté (1978), she retired from acting and relocated to Colombia, where she pursued her passion in photography.

== Personal life ==
De Funès is the daughter of Maria de Funès and the French director, François Gir. She is of Spanish descent through her mother. She is the niece of the actor Louis de Funès. In May 1970, she married the actor Michel Duchaussoy. The couple divorced in October 1971. On December 13, 1972, she gave birth to a daughter, Lisa. She went to live in Australia (in Sydney) and married a French Stewart Jean Raoul who lived in Sydney.

== Filmography ==
- Ces messieurs de la gâchette (1970)
- Musique s'il vous plaît (1970)
- Raphael, or The Debauched One (1971)
- Le dessous des cartes d'une partie de whist (1971)
- Les dossiers de Me Robineau: Les disparus de Senlis (1972)
- Pont dormant (1972)
- Baba Yaga (1973)
- Esprits de famille (1975)
- Le coup monté (1978)

== Discography ==
- La Journée D'Isabelle (1968)
