= Claudio Lippi =

Italian television presenter, actor and singer

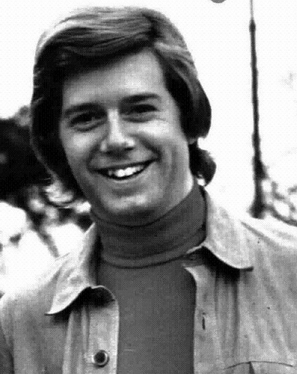
- Lippi in Radiocorriere magazine, 1973
- Born: 3 June 1945 (age 81); Milan, Italy
- Occupation: television presenter
- Height: 1.72 m (5 ft 8 in)

Claudio Lippi (born 3 June 1945) is an Italian television presenter, actor and singer.

== Life and career ==
Born in Milan, Lippi started his career in 1964 as a singer, achieving his greatest success with the song "Per ognuno c'è qualcuno". He later attempted without success to launch his own record label, Disco Azzurro.

After joining RAI, Lippi initially hosted several children's programs, before achieving his first major success in 1974 with the variety show Tanto Piacere. He later hosted numerous successful shows, notably Il pranzo è servito, Mai dire Gol, and Buona Domenica.

He was a judge on the first five seasons of the RAI programme Tale e quale show, the Italian adaptation of Your Face Sounds Familiar.

Lippi had a daughter, Lenni, with actress Laura Belli.
