= I Hate Blondes =

- Directed by: Giorgio Capitani
- Written by: Franco Marotta; Laura Toscano
- Starring: Enrico Montesano; Jean Rochefort; Corinne Cléry
- Cinematography: Roberto Gerardi; Silvano Ippoliti
- Edited by: Sergio Montanari
- Music by: Piero Umiliani
- Release date: October 29, 1980
- Language: Italian

I Hate Blondes (Italian: Odio le bionde) is a 1980 Italian crime comedy film directed by Giorgio Capitani.

== Cast ==
- Enrico Montesano as Emilio Serrantoni
- Jean Rochefort as Donald
- Corinne Cléry as Angelica
- Marina Langner as Valeria
- Paola Tedesco as Teresa
- Gigi Ballista as Psychoanalyst
- Ivan Desny as Brown
- Roberto Della Casa as Serge
- Anita Durante as Old woman in the church

== See also ==
- List of Italian films of 1980
