= Cause of Divorce =

- Directed by: Marcello Fondato
- Written by: Marcello Fondato
- Produced by: Dino De Laurentiis
- Starring: Enrico Montesano; Senta Berger; Catherine Spaak
- Cinematography: Luigi Kuveiller
- Music by: Carlo Rustichelli
- Production companies: Dino de Laurentiis Cinematografica; Oceanic Filmproduktion
- Distributed by: Dino de Laurentiis Distribuzione
- Release date: 3 March 1972
- Running time: 99 minutes
- Countries: Italy; West Germany
- Language: German

Cause of Divorce (Italian: Causa di divorzio) is a 1972 comedy film directed by Marcello Fondato and starring Enrico Montesano, Senta Berger, and Catherine Spaak. It was made as a co-production between Italy and West Germany.

== Cast ==
- Enrico Montesano as Silvestro Parolini
- Senta Berger as Enrica Sebastiani
- Catherine Spaak as Ernesta Maini
- Gastone Moschin as Lawyer
- Lino Toffolo as Vladimiro Pellegrini
- Gabriella Giorgelli as Gasoline pump attendant
- Arnoldo Foà as Maini - father of Ernesta
- Francesco Mulé as Judge
- Lino Banfi as Foreman
- Bruno Boschetti as Doctor

== Bibliography ==
- Moliterno, Gino. The A to Z of Italian Cinema. Scarecrow Press, 2009.
