= Il marsigliese =

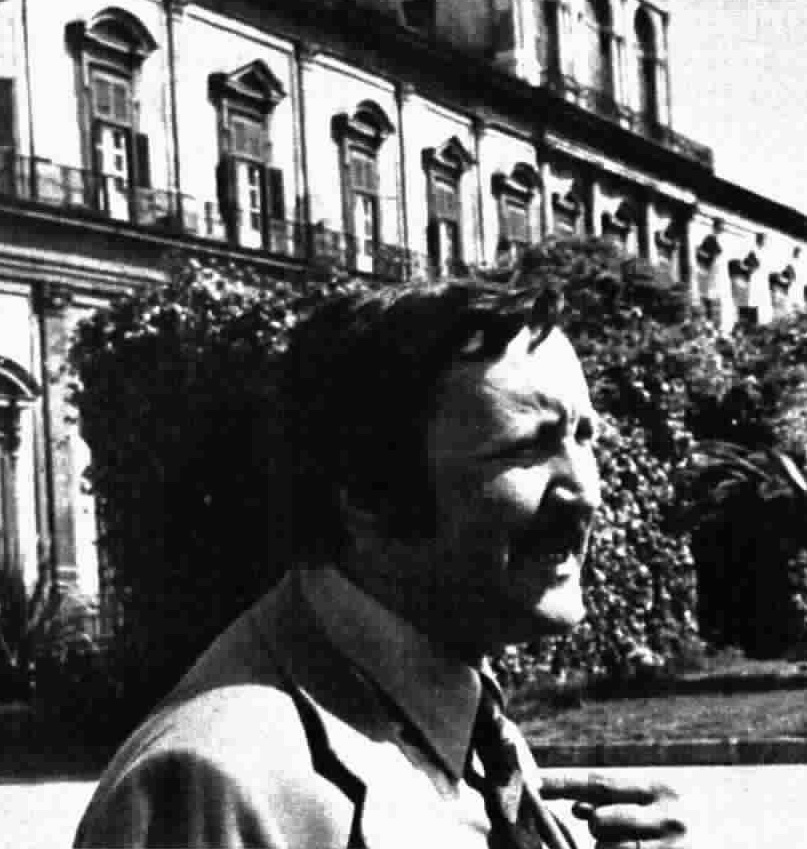
- Renato Mori as Ciccio Navarra, boss in tobacco smuggling, in TV movie
- Directed by: Giacomo Battiato
- Starring: Marc Porel; Lina Polito; Vittorio Mezzogiorno
- Country of origin: Italy
- No. of episodes: 3

Production
- Running time: 208 min. (the 3 episodes)
- Production company: Radiotelevisione Italiana

Original release
- Release: 1975

Il marsigliese is a 1975 Italian miniseries produced by Radiotelevisione Italiana. It was directed by Giacomo Battiato and stars Marc Porel as Pierre Toril and Lina Polito as Vicenzina Sannataro.

The miniseries tells about events linked to the fight for the control of cigarette smuggling between the Neapolitan, Sicilian and Marseilles crime families in Naples in the 1970s.

== Cast ==
- Marc Porel: as Pierre Toril
- Lina Polito: as Vicenzina Sannataro
- Vittorio Mezzogiorno: as Nino Sannataro
- Agla Marsili: as Nino Sannataro's wife
- Patrizio Esposito: as Nino Sannataro's son
- Renato Mori: as Ciccio Navarra
- Isa Danieli: as Maria, Navarra's wife
- Corrado Gaipa: as Tanino Sciacca
- Guido Cerniglia: as the Magistrate
- Nando Murolo: as Vito Amarillo
- Giuseppe Anatrelli: as Pascalino Agnone
- Ida Di Benedetto: as Agnone's wife
- Biagio Pelligra: as the Sicilian killer
