= Rodolfo Laganà =

Italian actor and comedian

- Born: 7 March 1957 (age 69); Rome, Italy
- Occupations: Actor; Comedian

Rodolfo Laganà (born 7 March 1957) is an Italian actor, comedian and playwright, whose career spanned over 40 years.

== Life and career ==
Born in Rome, between 1978 and 1982 Laganà studied acting at the Laboratorio di esercitazioni sceniche directed by Gigi Proietti. He started his career as a member of the comedy ensemble La Zavorra.

In 1982, Laganà made his television debut in Come Alice, and one year later, he made his film debut in Sergio Corbucci's Sing Sing. Laganà is mainly active on stage, where he took part in several Garinei & Giovannini productions as well as in a long series of one man show comedy plays. As a comedian, he specialized in mocking the uses and the perceived laziness of Roman people.

In 2014, Rodolfo Laganà revealed that he had been suffering from multiple sclerosis since 2010. Since then, he continued performing on stage in a wheelchair.
