= Chicken Park =

- Directed by: Jerry Calà
- Written by: Gino Capone; Galliano Juso
- Produced by: Galliano Juso
- Starring: Jerry Calà; Demetra Hampton; Rossy de Palma; Lawrence Steven Meyers
- Cinematography: Blasco Giurato
- Music by: Giovanni Nuti; Umberto Smaila
- Distributed by: Variety Distribution
- Release dates: 5 April 1996 (Turkey); 21 August 1996 (Spain)
- Running time: 93 minutes
- Countries: Italy; Dominican Republic
- Language: English

Chicken Park is a 1994 comedy parody film directed by and starring Jerry Calà that parodies various films, especially the 1993 film Jurassic Park. The film is Calà's directorial debut.

== Synopsis ==
When Vladimiro's chicken is stolen while he is in the Dominican Republic for a cockfight, he immediately begins trying to get it back. During his searches he discovers an entire zoo full of gigantic chickens.

== Cast ==
- Jerry Calà as Vladimiro
- Demetra Hampton as Sigourney
- Rossy de Palma as Necrophelia Addams
- Lawrence Steven Meyers as Dr. Eggs
- Alessia Marcuzzi as Airplane hostess

== Production ==
The film was shot between Santo Domingo, L'Aquila and Rome. It was filmed in English. The budget was two and a half billion lire. The film marked both the directorial debut of Calà and the film debut of actress Alessia Marcuzzi. It was also the last work as special effects artist for Antonio Margheriti. Calà had previously announced his debut as director with a completely different project, a biographical drama film about Umberto Bossi and Lega Nord, Il Longobardo, that was eventually abandoned.

== Parodies ==
The film mainly parodies Jurassic Park but also references many outer films and cultural icons in some gags, such as The Addams Family, Home Alone, The Deer Hunter, Full Metal Jacket, Sister Act, Pretty Woman, Hot Shots!, Il Postino: The Postman and Edward Scissorhands. Moreover, Pope John Paul II appears as a washer.

== Release ==
Chicken Park premiered at the 14th edition of Fantafestival, in which it entered the main competition. Due to production problems, it was not released theatrically in Italy. Broadcast by Italia 1, at its television premiere the film was seen by over 4 million people. The film was released in Turkey on 5 April 1996 as Piliç parki and subsequently in Spain as Pollo jurásico.

== Reception ==
Critical reception for the film was generally negative, with L'espresso calling the film "trash" and MDZ Online commenting that the film was of such poor quality that it had the potential to become a cult classic. Film critic Marco Giusti described the film as "supertrash", "more stupid than funny" and a film in which the best actor probably is Jo, the chicken owned by Calà. According to film critic Paolo Mereghetti the film fails almost entirely to raise a smile and the English version of the film, with Calà self-dubbing himself, is a must for trash-lovers. According to author Massimo Bertarelli, the film is just made of "exasperating drollery and depressing sloppiness".
