= Sing Sing (1983 film) =

- Italian theatrical release poster by Renato Casaro
- Directed by: Sergio Corbucci
- Written by: Sergio Corbucci; Franco Ferrini; Enrico Oldoini
- Produced by: Mario Cecchi Gori; Vittorio Cecchi Gori
- Starring: Adriano Celentano; Enrico Montesano; Marina Suma; Vanessa Redgrave
- Cinematography: Alessandro D'Eva
- Edited by: Ruggero Mastroianni
- Music by: Armando Trovaioli
- Release date: 15 October 1983 (Italy)
- Running time: 117 minutes
- Country: Italy
- Language: Italian

Sing Sing is a 1983 Italian comedy film directed by Sergio Corbucci. It stars Adriano Celentano, Enrico Montesano and Vanessa Redgrave. It was released in Italy on 15 October 1983.

== Plot ==
=== Segment: Edoardo ===
A Rome mechanic becomes convinced that he is the son of the Queen of the United Kingdom.

=== Segment: Boghi ===
And an inspector has to protect a film dubber pursued by a psychopath.

== Cast ==
Edoardo

- Enrico Montesano as Edoardo Mastronardi
- Vanessa Redgrave as the Queen
- Paolo Panelli as Augusto Mastronardi
- Lando Fiorini as Italo Mastronardi
- Carla Monti as Miss Mastronardi
- Orsetta Gregoretti as Roberta
- Franco Giacobini as Baron Orfeo della Torre
- Angela Goodwin as Lady Marian
- Désirée Nosbusch as the terrorist
- Gianni Minà as himself

Boghi

- Adriano Celentano as Alfredo Boghi
- Marina Suma as Linda
- Rodolfo Laganà as Oscar
- Pietro De Silva as Glauco Coccia
- Mario Cecchi Gori as police commissioner
- Haruhiko Yamanouchi as Chu Lai
