= Lobster for Breakfast =

- Directed by: Giorgio Capitani
- Written by: Laura Toscano; Franco Marotta
- Produced by: Eros Lanfranconi
- Starring: Enrico Montesano; Claude Brasseur
- Cinematography: Carlo Carlini
- Edited by: Antonio Siciliano
- Music by: Piero Umiliani
- Release date: 1979
- Country: Italy
- Language: Italian

Aragosta a colazione (internationally released as Lobster for Breakfast) is a 1979 Italian comedy film directed by Giorgio Capitani.

For his performance in this film and in Il ladrone, Enrico Montesano was awarded with a Special David di Donatello.

== Cast ==
- Enrico Montesano as Enrico Tucci
- Claude Brasseur as Mario Spinosi
- Janet Agren as Monique
- Claudine Auger as Carla Spinosi
- Silvia Dionisio as Matilde Tucci
- Adriana Innocenti as Miss Duchamp
- Renato Mori as Accountant Trocchia
- Roberto Della Casa as Sommelier

== See also ==
- List of Italian films of 1979
