= Tale e quale show =

- Genre: talent show, variety show
- Created by: Carlo Conti
- Based on: Tu cara me suena
- Screenplay by: Maurizio Pagnussat
- Presented by: Carlo Conti
- Judges: Loretta Goggi (2012 - 2023); Giorgio Panariello (2018 - 2025); Cristiano Malgioglio (2021-); Claudio Lippi (2012 - 2015); Christian De Sica (2012 - 2014, 2017); Vincenzo Salemme (2018 - 2020); Enrico Montesano (2016); Alessia Marcuzzi (2024 - 2025); Gigi Proietti (2015); Claudio Amendola (2016 - 2017); Elettra Lamborghini (2026); Alessandro Siani (2026)
- Composer: Pinuccio Pirazzoli
- Country of origin: Italy
- Original language: Italian
- No. of seasons: 15
- No. of episodes: 108

Production
- Executive producer: Monica Avanzini
- Producer: Stefano Riganello
- Production location: Italy
- Cinematography: Daniele Pecorelli; Matteo Cellini; Marco Marinotti
- Running time: 150 minutes
- Production company: Endemol Shine Italy

Original release
- Network: Rai
- Release: 20 April 2012 – present
- Network: Rai 1

Tale e quale show (lit. 'Just like the show') is an Italian television programme of the talent show and variety genre, broadcast in prime time on Rai 1 since 20 April 2012 and hosted by Carlo Conti.

The programme is the Italian adaptation of the talent show Tu cara me suena, a Spanish format by Endemol broadcast on Antena 3. In the United Kingdom, it was adapted as Your Face Sounds Familiar.

== Format ==
The talent show initially featured a competition between eight celebrities—four men and four women—who impersonated famous singers by reinterpreting their songs live. In 2013, the number of participating artists increased to ten (starting with the second season), and from 2014 to 2019, to twelve. This number then returned to ten in 2020, rose to eleven in 2021, and again to twelve from 2022 to 2023 (when a single, talented couple competed), before finally dropping back to eleven in 2024. At the end of the episode, the contestants are judged by a jury. The current jury consists of Giorgio Panariello, who has been participating since the eighth season, Cristiano Malgioglio, who has been participating since the eleventh season, and Alessia Marcuzzi, who has been participating since the fourteenth season. Previous judges have also included Loretta Goggi, Vincenzo Salemme, Christian De Sica, Enrico Montesano, Claudio Amendola, Claudio Lippi and Gigi Proietti.

Each judge draws up a ranking at the end of the evening, assigning each contestant a different score (starting from a minimum of 5 points and ending with a maximum of 12, 14, 15, or 16 points, depending on the number of contestants in the competition). Furthermore, each participant is asked to assign five points to an opponent (or to themselves), which are added to those assigned by the judges. This determines the weekly ranking (with a winner of each episode, who will donate the sum won to charity). The points accumulated by the contestants in the previous episode are then calculated, leading to the overall winner, who is declared in the final rankings on the last episode. In the 2013 edition, there was a special episode, held on 13 November, in which an overall score, determined 40% by the voting mechanism described above and 60% by televoting, selected the top seven contestants of the 2013 season, who continued in the competition along with the top three from previous editions.

Tale e quale show is the first prime time programme to be broadcast from the Dear Studios after the name change to Fabrizio Frizzi Television Studios.

The programmes behind-the-scenes personnel include Carlo Conti, Ivana Sabatini, Emanuele Giovannini, Leopoldo Siano, Mario D'Amico, Walter Santillo, Stefania De Finis, Claudia Di Giuseppe and Mattia Bravi.

== Judges ==
Judge	Season																Total
Judge	1	2	3	4	5	6	7	8	9	10	11	12	13	14	15	16	Total
Loretta Goggi																	13
Giorgio Panariello																	8
Cristiano Malgioglio																	6
Claudio Lippi																	5
Christian De Sica																	5
Vincenzo Salemme																	3
Enrico Montesano																	2
Alessia Marcuzzi																	2
Gigi Proietti																	1
Claudio Amendola																	1
Elettra Lamborghini																	1
Alessandro Siani																	1

== Seasons ==
Season	Presenter	Period		Episodes	Competitors	Jury			Winner	Television studio	Site	Director	Network
Season	Presenter	Start	End	Episodes	Competitors	Jury			Winner	Television studio	Site	Director	Network
1	Carlo Conti	20 April 2012	11 May 2012	4	8	Christian De Sica	Loretta Goggi	Claudio Lippi	Serena Autieri	Studios (formerly De Paolis)	Rome	Maurizio Pagnussat	Rai 1
2	Carlo Conti	14 September 14, 2012	2 November 2012	8	8	Christian De Sica	Loretta Goggi	Claudio Lippi	Giò Di Tonno	Studios (formerly De Paolis)	Rome	Maurizio Pagnussat	Rai 1
3	Carlo Conti	13 September 2013	13 November 2013	9	10	Christian De Sica	Loretta Goggi	Claudio Lippi	Attilio Fontana	Studio 5 of the Fabrizio Frizzi Television Studios	Rome	Maurizio Pagnussat	Rai 1
4	Carlo Conti	12 September 2014	7 November 2014	8	12	Christian De Sica	Loretta Goggi	Claudio Lippi	Serena Rossi	Studio 5 of the Fabrizio Frizzi Television Studios	Rome	Maurizio Pagnussat	Rai 1
5	Carlo Conti	11 September 2015	23 October 2015	7	12	Gigi Proietti	Loretta Goggi	Claudio Lippi	Francesco Cicchella	Theater 9 of the Studios (formerly De Paolis)	Rome	Maurizio Pagnussat	Rai 1
6	Carlo Conti	16 September 2016	4 November 2016	8	12	Claudio Amendola	Loretta Goggi	Enrico Montesano	Silvia Mezzanotte	Theater 9 of the Studios (formerly De Paolis)	Rome	Maurizio Pagnussat	Rai 1
7	Carlo Conti	22 September 2017	11 November 2017	8	12	Christian De Sica	Loretta Goggi	Enrico Montesano	Marco Carta	Studio 5 of the Fabrizio Frizzi Television Studios	Rome	Maurizio Pagnussat	Rai 1
8	Carlo Conti	14 September 2018	26 October 2018	7	12	Vincenzo Salemme	Loretta Goggi	Giorgio Panariello	Antonio Mezzancella	Studio 5 of the Fabrizio Frizzi Television Studios	Rome	Maurizio Pagnussat	Rai 1
9	Carlo Conti	September 13, 2019	October 18, 2019	6	12	Vincenzo Salemme	Loretta Goggi	Giorgio Panariello	Agostino Penna	Studio 5 of the Fabrizio Frizzi Television Studios	Rome	Maurizio Pagnussat	Rai 1
10	Carlo Conti	18 September 2020	23 October 2020	6	10	Vincenzo Salemme	Loretta Goggi	Giorgio Panariello	Pago	Studio 5 of the Fabrizio Frizzi Television Studios	Rome	Maurizio Pagnussat	Rai 1
11	Carlo Conti	27 September 2021	5 November 2021	8	11	Cristiano Malgioglio	Loretta Goggi	Giorgio Panariello	Gemelli di Guidonia	Studio 5 of the Fabrizio Frizzi Television Studios	Rome	Maurizio Pagnussat	Rai 1
12	Carlo Conti	30 September 2022	11 November 2022	7	11	Cristiano Malgioglio	Loretta Goggi	Giorgio Panariello	Antonino Spadaccino	Studio 5 of the Fabrizio Frizzi Television Studios	Rome	Maurizio Pagnussat	Rai 1
13	Carlo Conti	22 September 2023	3 November 2023	7	11	Cristiano Malgioglio	Loretta Goggi	Giorgio Panariello	Luca Gaudiano	Studio 5 of the Fabrizio Frizzi Television Studios	Rome	Maurizio Pagnussat	Rai 1
14	Carlo Conti	20 September 2024	8 November 2024	8	11	Cristiano Malgioglio	Alessia Marcuzzi	Giorgio Panariello	Verdiana Zangaro	Studio 5 of the Fabrizio Frizzi Television Studios	Rome	Maurizio Pagnussat	Rai 1
15	Carlo Conti	26 September 2025	7 November 2025	7	10	Cristiano Malgioglio	Alessia Marcuzzi	Giorgio Panariello	Tony Maiello	Studio 5 of the Fabrizio Frizzi Television Studios	Rome	Maurizio Pagnussat	Rai 1
16	Carlo Conti	23 September 2026	Currently airing	to be aired	11	Cristiano Malgioglio	Elettra Lamborghini	Alessandro Siani		Studio 5 of the Fabrizio Frizzi Television Studios	Rome	Maurizio Pagnussat	Rai 1

== Spin-offs ==
=== Tale e quale show - Il torneo ===
From the second to the thirteenth season, at the end of the programme, a mini-tournament was announced, known precisely as Tale e quale show - Il torneo, in which the best classified of the most recent season challenged competitors of the previous season to decide the champion of the two series.

=== Tale e quale show - Duetti ===
At the end of the second season, a special episode called Tale e quale show - Duetti was produced, in which the contestants of the first two seasons of the programme challenged each other in duets.

=== Tali e quali ===
At the end of the eighth season of the show and from the tenth season onwards, a spin-off entitled Tali e quali was produced, in which ordinary people (non-professionals and not part of the entertainment world) perform, chosen from those who sent the programme's editorial staff amateur videos of their impersonations during the episodes of the recently concluded edition.

=== Natale e quale show ===
After the fifth, eleventh and twelfth seasons, a Christmas-themed spin-off entitled Natale e quale show was produced, in which some contestants from previous seasons performed Christmas-themed songs.

=== Tale e quale Sanremo ===
At the end of the third and fourth seasons of Tali e quali, a spin-off entitled Tale e quale Sanremo was produced, in which the contestants from the previous seasons performed songs from the Sanremo Music Festival.

== Viewership ==
Number	Network	Year	Season	Programming							Time slot	Average audience		Premiere		Source	Finale		Source
Number	Network	Year	Season	L	M	M	G	V	S	D	Time slot	Viewers	Share	Viewers	Share	Source	Viewers	Share	Source
1	Rai 1	2012	Spring								Prime time	5,412,000	22.54%	5,470,000	21.84%		5,566,000	24.72%	
2	Rai 1	2012	Summer-autumn								Prime time	5,437 000	22.35%	4,620,000	19.68%		5 856 000	24.46%	
3	Rai 1	2013	Summer-autumn								Prime time	5,758 000	24.82%	5,172,000	24.02%		5 524 000	23.75%	
4	Rai 1	2014	Summer-autumn								Prime time	5,827,000	26.18%	5,477,000	26.74%		6,653,000	28.54%	
5	Rai 1	2015	Summer-autumn								Prime time	5,069,000	23.44%	4,817,000	23.64%		5,267,000	24.02%	
6	Rai 1	2016	Summer-autumn								Prime time	4 940,000	22.92%	4,591,000	21.81%		5,054,000	23.15%	
7	Rai 1	2017	Autumn								Prime time	4,496,000	21.80%	4,572,000	22.13%		4,028,000	21.13%	
8	Rai 1	2018	Summer-autumn								Prime time	4,319,000	21.58%	4,430,000	23.24%		4,425,000	21.99%	
9	Rai 1	2019	Summer-autumn								Prime time	3,807,000	19.69%	3,844,000	21.46%		3,903,000	19.54%	
10	Rai 1	2020	Summer-autumn								Prime time	3,904,000	18.87%	3,524,000	18.90%		4,209,000	19.10%	
11	Rai 1	2021	Summer-autumn								Prime time	4,148,000	21.96%	3,969,000	22.48%		4,509,000	22.60%	
12	Rai 1	2022	Autumn								Prime time	3,930,000	23.95%	3,385,000	21.10%		4,454,000	28.10%	
13	Rai 1	2023	Autumn								Prime time	3,492,000	22.88%	2,974,000	20.60%		3,913,000	25.08%	
14	Rai 1	2024	Summer-autumn								Prime time	3,266,000	21.33%	3,012,000	19,87%		3,429,000	22.64%	
15	Rai 1	2025	Autumn								Prime time	2,971,000	20.13%	2,783,000	19.30%		3 142 000	21.60%	

== Awards ==
- 2013 - Television Directing Award, Top Ten Category
- 2013 - Television Directing Award in the Broadcast of the Year category
- 2014 - Television Directing Award, Top Ten Category
- 2015 - Television Directing Award, Top Ten Category
- 2015 - Television Directing Award, Broadcast of the Year category
- 2016 - Television Directing Award, Top Ten Category

== See also ==
- Your Face Sounds Familiar
