= Tre colonne in cronaca =

- Directed by: Carlo Vanzina
- Cinematography: Luigi Kuveiller
- Edited by: Ruggero Mastroianni
- Music by: Ennio Morricone
- Release date: 1990
- Language: Italian

Tre colonne in cronaca (Three columns in the news) is a 1990 Italian drama film directed by Carlo Vanzina. It is loosely based on the novel with the same name written by Corrado Augias and Daniela Pasti.

For his performance Sergio Castellitto won the David di Donatello award for best supporting actor.

== Cast ==
- Gian Maria Volonté: Landolfi
- Massimo Dapporto: Commissioner Dante Morisi
- Sergio Castellitto: Quinto
- Demetra Hampton: Kim
- Paolo Malco: Bruno Lachioma
- Lucrezia Lante Della Rovere: Monica Guarini
- Spiros Focás: Bassouri
- Angelica Ippolito: Giuditta Guarini
- Gianni Bonagura: Petroni
- Sandro Ghiani: Urru
- Carlo Giuffrè: Spanò
- Joss Ackland: Gaetano Leporino
- Senta Berger: Countess Odessa Bonaveri
- Pierfrancesco Aiello: Fabrizio
- Silverio Blasi: Castagna
- Pina Cei: Margherita
- Sandra Collodel: Irene
- Clara Colosimo: Old lady with the cats
- Tony Sperandeo: Trapani
- Ivano Marescotti: Judge Manicardi
- Maurizio Mattioli: Car park attendant
- Piero Gerlini: Santarelli
- Piero Gerlini: Leporino's ex-wife
