= Il ladrone =

1980 film

Il ladrone (The Good Thief)
- Directed by: Pasquale Festa Campanile
- Written by: Pasquale Festa Campanile, Ottavo Jemma
- Produced by: Fulvio Lucisano
- Starring: Enrico Montesano, Edwige Fenech, Claudio Cassinelli
- Cinematography: Giancarlo Ferrando
- Edited by: Alberto Gallitti
- Music by: Ennio Morricone
- Distributed by: IIF – Fulvio Lucisano
- Release date: 1980
- Running time: 112 min
- Country: Italy
- Language: Italian

Il ladrone (internationally released as The Good Thief and The Thief) is a 1980 Italian comedy film written and directed by Pasquale Festa Campanile.

For his performance in this film and in Aragosta a colazione, Enrico Montesano was awarded with a Special David di Donatello award.

== Plot ==
In Palestine, the thief Caleb deceives his victims with fake miracles, and the man gets very upset when he learns that a young man by the name of Christ, the Messiah, performs real miracles, healing people and raising the dead. Caleb is jailed by the Romans. He will die along with the Messiah.

== Cast ==
- Enrico Montesano: Caleb
- Edwige Fenech: Deborah
- Bernadette Lafont: Appula
- Claudio Cassinelli: Jesus
- Susanna Martinková
- Sara Franchetti
- Auretta Gay
