= Enrico Montesano =

Italian actor (born 1945)

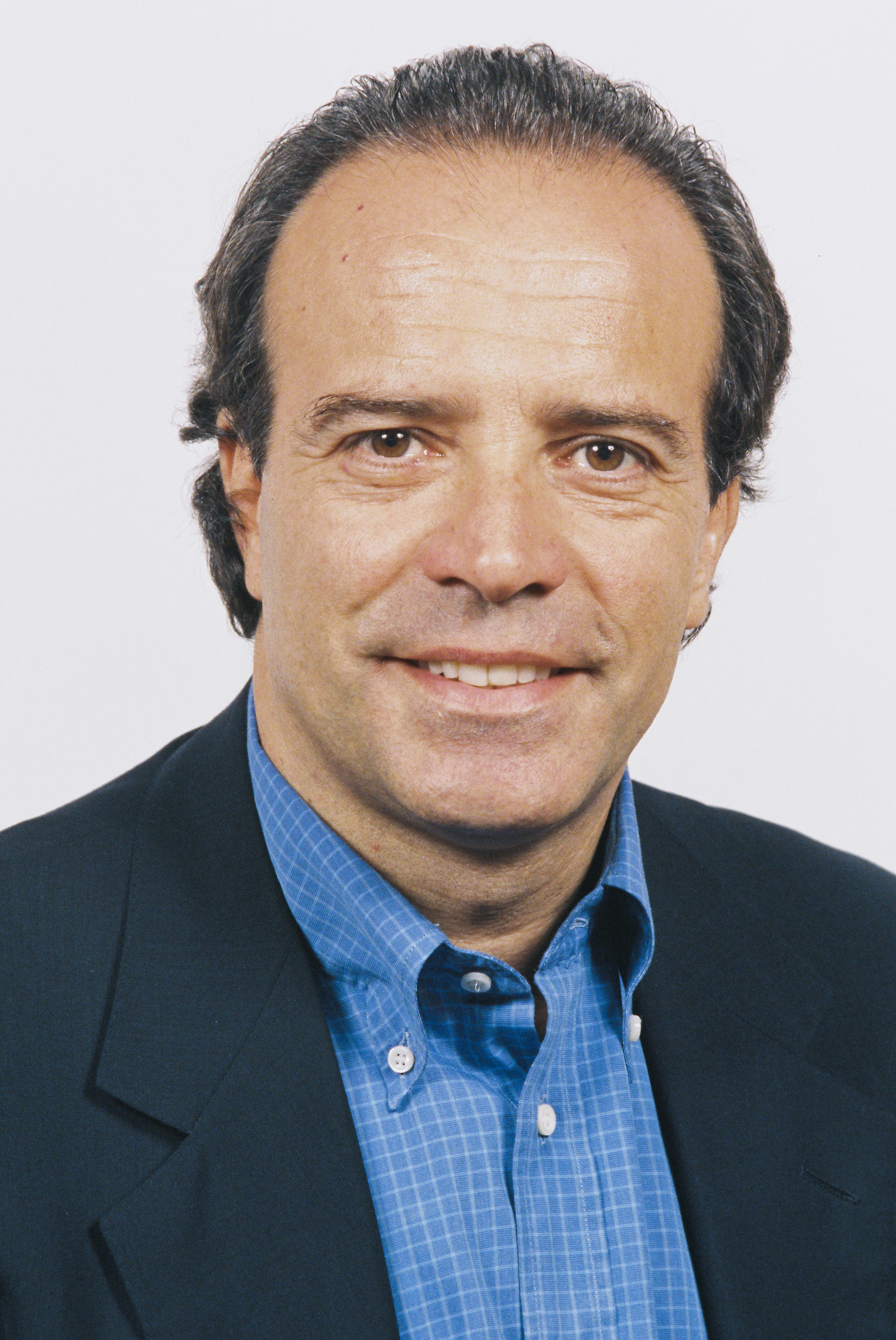
- Montesano in 1994
- Born: 7 June 1945 (age 81); Rome, Kingdom of Italy
- Occupations: Actor, comedian
- Years active: 1967–present
- Height: 1.73 m (5 ft 8 in)
- Spouse: Teresa Trisorio (m. 1992)
- Children: 6

Enrico Montesano (born 7 June 1945) is an Italian actor, comedian, television host, screenwriter and showman.

== Career ==
Montesano comes from a family involved in theatre, and he made his debut in 1966 in a show named Humor nero, alongside of Vittorio Metz. Later he became a very popular actor both on theatre and on television, thanks to his burlesque and brilliant style, and so during seventies he took part in several Italian comedies. He is probably best known for the role of Armando "Er Pomata" Pellicci in the cult movie Febbre da cavallo (1976), directed by Steno, but also for the role of Caleb, the good thief from Il ladrone (1980), directed by Pasquale Festa Campanile. Montesano won a David di Donatello as best new director for the movie A me mi piace (1985), in which he is both actor and director. His career continued from 1967 to 2010.

From 2016 to 2017, he was a judge on the RAI programme Tale e quale show, the Italian adaptation of Your Face Sounds Familiar.

== Personal life ==
Since 2020, he has started a political battle against 5G, then attacking the "imposition" of vaccines and the restrictions due to measures to combat the COVID-19 pandemic through numerous videos on social networks. He has published numerous videos in which he takes critical positions towards the management of the COVID-19 pandemic and supports numerous conspiracy theories related to the pandemic and vaccines. In June 2021 he became the spokesperson for a false theory according to which the blood donated by vaccinated people is eliminated. The actor later apologized, saying he had been misinterpreted.

In late 2022 he was disqualified from RAI's Dancing with the Stars show after pictures posted from an audition showed him wearing a shirt with a symbol and motto of the Decima MAS unit that was active in the Nazi-Fascist Salò Republic puppet state under Nazi German occupation and committed some of the most serious crimes in wartime Italy by systematically carrying out public executions, massacres of civilian towns, torture, rapes and also favouring the Nazi genocide by assisting the SS in round-ups and "punishment operations" against civilians.

== Filmography ==
- 1967: Stasera mi butto directed by Ettore Maria Fizzarotti
- 1967: Io non protesto, io amo directed by Ferdinando Baldi
- 1967: Nel sole directed by Aldo Grimaldi
- 1968: L'oro del mondo directed by Aldo Grimaldi
- 1968: Donne, botte e bersaglieri directed by Ruggero Deodato
- 1969: I quattro del pater noster directed by Ruggero Deodato
- 1969: Zum zum zum - La canzone che mi passa per la testa directed by Bruno Corbucci and Sergio Corbucci
- 1970: Io non scappo... fuggo directed by Franco Prosperi
- 1971: Io non vedo, tu non parli, lui non sente directed by Mario Camerini
- 1971: Io non spezzo... rompo directed by Bruno Corbucci
- 1971: Il furto è l'anima del commercio...?! directed by Bruno Corbucci
- 1972: Il terrore con gli occhi storti directed by Steno
- 1972: Cause of Divorce directed by Marcello Fondato
- 1972: Boccaccio directed by Bruno Corbucci
- 1972: The Mighty Anselmo and His Squire directed by Bruno Corbucci
- 1973: The Lady Has Been Raped directed by Vittorio Sindoni
- 1975: Amore vuol dir gelosia directed by Mauro Severino
- 1976: L'Italia s'è rotta directed by Steno
- 1976: Febbre da cavallo directed by Steno
- 1976: Remo e Romolo - Storia di due figli di una lupa directed by Castellacci and Pingitore
- 1976: Sex with a Smile directed by Sergio Martino
- 1976: Sex with a Smile II directed by Sergio Martino
- 1976: Tutti possono arricchire tranne i poveri directed by Mauro Severino
- 1977: Stato interessante directed by Sergio Nasca
- 1977: Il marito in collegio directed by Maurizio Lucidi
- 1977: Three Tigers Against Three Tigers directed by Sergio Corbucci and Steno
- 1977: Pane, burro e marmellata directed by Giorgio Capitani
- 1977: Melodrammore directed by Maurizio Costanzo
- 1977: Nerone directed by Castellacci and Pingitore
- 1978: Tutto suo padre directed by Maurizio Lucidi
- 1978: Le braghe del padrone directed by Flavio Mogherini
- 1978: Io tigro, tu tigri, egli tigra directed by Giorgio Capitani
- 1979: Love in First Class directed by Salvatore Samperi
- 1979: Lobster for Breakfast directed by Giorgio Capitani
- 1980: I Hate Blondes directed by Giorgio Capitani
- 1980: Qua la mano directed by Pasquale Festa Campanile
- 1980: Il ladrone directed by Pasquale Festa Campanile
- 1981: Quando la coppia scoppia (anche soggetto) directed by Steno
- 1981: Culo e camicia directed by Pasquale Festa Campanile
- 1981: Camera d'albergo directed by Mario Monicelli
- 1982: Il paramedico directed by Sergio Nasca
- 1982: Più bello di così si muore directed by Pasquale Festa Campanile
- 1982: Grand Hotel Excelsior directed by Castellano & Pipolo
- 1982: Count Tacchia directed by Sergio Corbucci
- 1983: Sing Sing directed by Sergio Corbucci
- 1984: Mi faccia causa directed by Steno
- 1984: Softly, Softly directed by Lina Wertmüller
- 1984: I due carabinieri directed by Carlo Verdone
- 1985: A me mi piace directed by Enrico Montesano
- 1986: Grandi magazzini directed by Castellano & Pipolo
- 1986: Il tenente dei carabinieri directed by Maurizio Ponzi
- 1987: Noi uomini duri directed by Maurizio Ponzi
- 1988: Il volpone directed by Maurizio Ponzi
- 1988: The Rogues directed by Mario Monicelli
- 1991: Piedipiatti (anche soggetto) directed by Carlo Vanzina
- 1993: Cain vs. Cain directed by Alessandro Benvenuti
- 1994: Anche i commercialisti hanno un'anima directed by Maurizio Ponzi
- 2002: Febbre da cavallo - La mandrakata directed by Carlo Vanzina
- 2007: Il lupo directed by Stefano Calvagna
- 2008: Bastardi directed by Federico Del Zoppo and Andres Alce Meldonado
- 2009: Many Kisses Later directed by Fausto Brizzi
- 2010: Tutto l'amore del mondo directed by Riccardo Grandi
- 2019: Vivere directed by Francesca Archibugi
