= Pane, burro e marmellata =

1977 Italian film

- DVD cover
- Directed by: Giorgio Capitani
- Written by: Giorgio Capitani; Franco Ferrer; Enrico Montesano
- Based on: Les Bonshommes by Françoise Dorin
- Starring: Enrico Montesano
- Cinematography: Roberto Gerardi
- Edited by: Renato Cinquini
- Music by: Piero Umiliani
- Production company: Italian International Film
- Release date: 1977
- Running time: 100 minutes
- Country: Italy
- Language: Italian

Pane, burro e marmellata (translation: "Bread, Butter and Marmalade") is a 1977 Italian comedy film directed by Giorgio Capitani and starring Enrico Montesano.

== Cast ==
- Enrico Montesano as Bruno Desantis
- Rossana Podestà as Simona
- Claudine Auger as Betty
- Rita Tushingham as Vera
- Bente Szacinski
- Laura Trotter
- Franco Giacobini
- Jacques Herlin
- Adolfo Celi
- Stefano Amato
- Paola Arduini
- Dino Emanuelli
- Franca Scagnetti
