= Alessia Marcuzzi =

Italian television host and actress (born 1972)

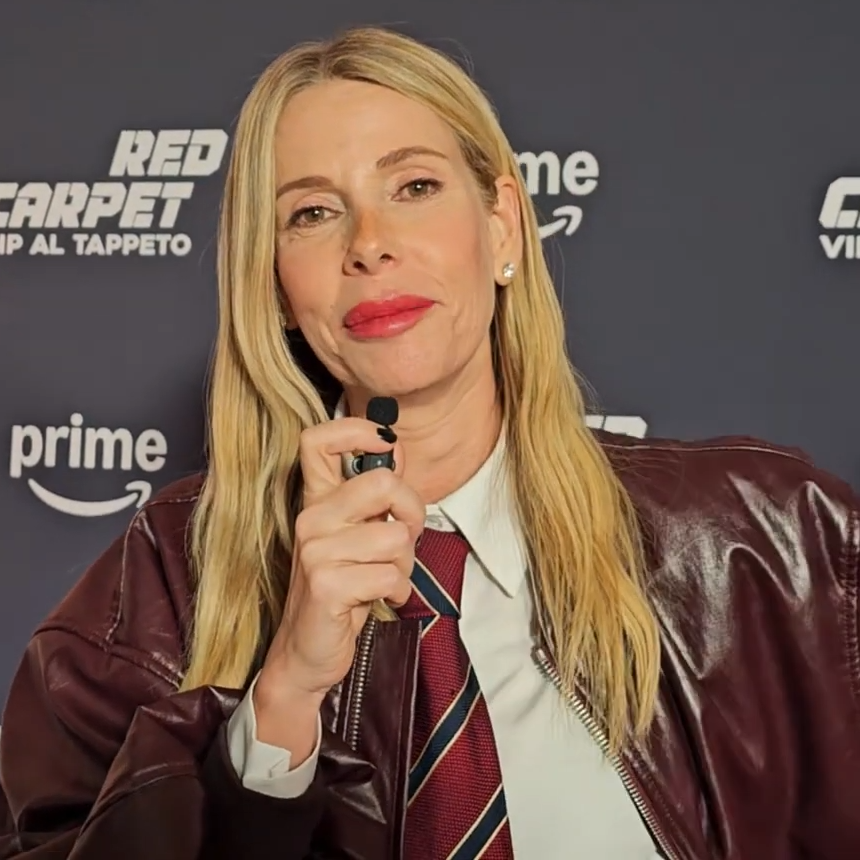
- Alessia Marcuzzi in January 2025
- Born: 11 November 1972 (age 54); Rome, Italy
- Occupations: Television personality; actress; model
- Years active: 1991–present
- Spouse: Paolo Calabresi Marconi (m. 2014)
- Partner(s): Simone Inzaghi (2000–2004); Pietro Sermonti (?-2010); Francesco Facchinetti (2010–2012)
- Children: 2

Alessia Marcuzzi (Italian pronunciation: [aˈlɛssja marˈkuttsi]; born 11 November 1972) is an Italian television host, actress and former fashion model. In a career spanning over 30 years, she also co-hosted Sanremo Music Festival 2025.

== Career ==
Born in Rome, to father Eugenio, from Trieste, and mother Antonietta from Roseto Valfortore, in the province of Foggia, Marcuzzi debuted on Telemontecarlo hosting Attenti al dettaglio and then Qui si gioca, with José Altafini, in the 1991/1992 season. In March 1992, she also presented the children's show Amici mostri. In the 1992/1993 season hosted the entertainment show Novantatrè, with Umberto Smaila. She appeared on RAI television in 1994, with Gigi Sabani, in Il grande gioco dell'oca. In 1994, she also debuted as actress in the movies Chicken Park, directed by Jerry Calà, and Tra noi due è tutto finito.

Marcuzzi started working at Mediaset beginning in November 1995, hosting the Italia 1 Saturday afternoon program Colpo di fulmine, until June 1997. It became a daily show in 1996, because of its popularity. Thanks to this program, she became one of the best-known Italia 1 hosts; in this period she started hosting the well-known music festival Festivalbar, from 1996 to 2002, with whom she won a Telegatto. In 2001, she presented the late-night show 8 millimetri with Paolo Brosio and, from 1997 to 1998, the afternoon show Fuego!. She also presented the primetime show Mai dire Gol, from 1998 to 2000, with Ellen Hidding and Gialappa's Band. During these years, she also acted in the movies Gunslinger's Revenge, directed by Giovanni Veronesi, Tutti gli uomini del deficiente, the TV movie Un cane e un poliziotto and the series Tequila & Bonetti, with Jack Scalia. In 2000, she hosted the pilot of Macchemù, with Paola Barale, dedicated to television themes, and won the Oscar TV as "Personaggio televisivo femminile dell'anno".

From 2000, Marcuzzi replaced Simona Ventura in the Italian version of Caiga Quien Caiga, named Le Iene, presenting it until 2005, aired by Italia 1 initially as a late-night show and then as a primetime show.

In 2002 and 2003 she presented the Telegatto awards and, in 2003 too, the Galà della pubblicità, with Heidi Klum; both events were aired by Canale 5. In the autumn of 2003 she hosted the charity show La fabbrica del sorriso, with Gerry Scotti, Claudio Bisio and Michelle Hunziker. In the same years she won Premio Flaiano and another Oscar TV for Le iene.

After hosting an edition of Scherzi a parte in 2005, with Diego Abatantuono and Massimo Boldi, in 2006 she replaced Barbara D'Urso presenting the Italian version of Big Brother, Grande Fratello, that she finished hosting in 2015.

From 2004 to 2006, she was the protagonist of the television series Carabinieri, while in 2007 she acted in Il giudice Mastrangelo 2. She also acted in the TV movie Un amore di strega, with Pietro Sermonti, her partner in 2009, and in the sitcom Così fan tutte, with Debora Villa.

Her credits also include performances in various films and television, with starring roles in Leonardo Pieraccioni's 1998 feature film Il mio West, as well as the TV shows Tequila and Bonetti (2000) and Carabinieri.

She co-hosted the final night of the Sanremo Music Festival 2025 alongside Alessandro Cattelan and Carlo Conti.

== Personal life ==
Marcuzzi has a son, Tommaso (born 29 April 2001), with Simone Inzaghi, an Italian former footballer (relationship ended in 2004), and a daughter, Mia (born 4 September 2011), with television host and singer Francesco Facchinetti (relationship ended in October 2012). Marcuzzi married Paolo Calabresi Marconi in December 2014.

== Filmography ==
=== Film ===
Year	Title	Role	Notes
1994	Chicken Park	Flight Assistant	
1994	Tra noi due tutto è finito	Andrea	
1998	Gunslinger's Revenge	Mary	
1999	All the Moron's Men	Leone's Fan	
2000	Dinosaur	Neera (voice)	Italian dub
2016	Storks	Tulip (voice)	Italian dub

=== Television (as an actress) ===
Year	Title	Role	Notes
2000	Tequila & Bonetti	Agent Fabiana Sasso	Main role
2004–2006	Carabinieri	Sergeant Andrea Sepi	Main role (season 3-5)
2007	Camera Café	Herself	Episode: "Il fantasma"
2007	Il giudice Mastrangelo	Prosecutor Claudia Nicolai	Main role (season 2)
2009	Un amore di strega	Carlotta	Television film
2011–2012	Così fan tutte	Alessia / Various	Main role

=== Television hosting and appearances ===
Year	Title	Role	Notes
1992	Amici mostri	Herself / Co-host	Children's show (season 1)
1992–1993	Novantatré	Herself / Co-host	Game show
1994	El gran juego de la oca	Herself / Co-host	Game show (season 2)
1995–1997	Colpo di fulmine	Herself / Host	Reality show (season 1-2)
1996–2000	Festivalbar	Herself / Co-host	Annual music contest
1997–1998	8 mm - Prime Time	Herself / Co-host	Docu-reality
1997–1998	Fuego	Herself / Host	Variety show (season 1)
1997–2000	Mai dire Gol	Herself / Co-host	Sports program (season 7-10)
2000	DopoFestival	Herself / Host	Sanremo Music Festival aftershow
2001–2021	Le Iene	Herself / Host	Information and variety show (season 5-9 and 22-24)
2002–2003	Telegatto	Herself / Host	Annual award ceremony
2004	Mai dire Iene	Herself / Host	Parody of Le Iene
2005	Scherzi a parte	Herself / Host	Prank candid-camera show (season 9)
2006–2015	Grande Fratello	Herself / Host	Reality show (season 6-14)
2013	Fashion Style	Herself / Judge	Reality competition series
2013–2014	Extreme Makeover: Home Edition Italia	Herself / Host	Reality show
2013–2018	Coca-Cola Summer Festival	Herself / Host	Annual music event
2015–2019	L'isola dei famosi	Herself / Host	Reality show (season 10-14)
2019	Temptation Island VIP	Herself / Host	Reality show (season 2)
2020	Amici di Maria De Filippi	Herself / Judge	Talent show (season 19)
2020	Temptation Island	Herself / Host	Reality show (season 9)
2023	Boomerissima	Herself / Host	Game show
2023	Viva Rai2! Viva Sanremo! su Rai1	Herself / Host	Sanremo Music Festival aftershow
2024–2025	Tale e quale show	Herself / Judge	Talent show (season 14-15)
2025	Sanremo Music Festival 2025	Herself / Co-host	Annual music festival (only for the final night)
2025	Obbligo o verità	Herself / Host	Game show
2025	Red Carpet - Vip al tappeto	Herself / Host	Reality show
2025–present	The Traitors	Herself / Host	Reality competition series
