= Febbre da cavallo =

1976 film

- Film poster
- Directed by: Steno
- Written by: Alfredo Giannetti; Massimo Patrizi; Steno; Enrico Vanzina
- Produced by: Roberto Infascelli
- Starring: Gigi Proietti; Enrico Montesano; Francesco De Rosa; Mario Carotenuto; Catherine Spaak; Adolfo Celi
- Cinematography: Emilio Loffredo
- Edited by: Raimondo Crociani
- Music by: Franco Bixio; Fabio Frizzi; Vince Tempera
- Release date: 1976
- Running time: 94 minutes
- Country: Italy
- Language: Italian

Febbre da cavallo (Horse Fever) is a 1976 Italian comedy film directed by Steno and starring Gigi Proietti. It was shown as part of a retrospective on Italian comedy at the 67th Venice International Film Festival.

== Plot ==
Bruno Fioretti, known as "Mandrake", is an inveterate gambler who never misses a day at the horse racing track in Rome. He is always at the track together with his friends Armando Pellicci, known as "Er Pomata" due to his use of hair gel, and Felice Roversi. They always bet on the wrong horses and they always end up being penniless.

One day the three go to the Agnano Hippodrome to watch the race, but their horse loses. Back home, Gabriella, Mandrake's girlfriend, tired of the constant shortcomings of her partner, asks for advice from a fortune teller, who, without any purpose, induces her to bet on a Tris race. The three horses indicated by the cards and by Mandrake himself (Soldatino, King and D'Artagnan) are among the worst in circulation; above all Soldatino, the horse owned by lawyer De Marchis, a betting partner of the three friends.

Witnessing a horse race in Cesena, Mandrake seems so determined to follow Gabriella's advice, but is convinced by Pomata to focus on another horse (Antonello da Messina, the superfavorite). The prediction of the fortune teller, however, is correct: Soldatino, King and D'Artagnan win the race and the astonished Mandrake, to save his relationship with Gabriella, shows her a false play by filling it with vain promises for the future. Furious with Pomata for his incorrect prediction, Mandrake begins to wait for him at home, together with "Er Ventresca", a creditor who has long been waiting to collect 300,000 lire from Pomata, managing to find him when he has set up the burial chamber for his late grandmother in her home. The death of the grandmother is actually staged by Pomata to escape his numerous creditors. In the end, the three friends are forced to devise a "super-mandrakata", as Mandrake defines his brilliant scams, together with Pomata, Felice, De Marchis and her friend Mafalda.

Given that Soldatino has begun to brilliantly win all his races, the cronies decide that Mandrake will replace the unbeatable Jean-Louis Rossini, jockey of the only true rival of De Marchis' horse, Bernadette, in the imminent Grand Prix of the Aces of Tor di Valle, to slow it down, and bet on Soldatino, whose odds are still very high. De Marchis will also have the opportunity to triumph over his eternal rival Conte Dallara, owner of Bernadette, who has decided to bet on the sure win, since Rossini has never lost a race. The first part of the plan succeeds perfectly, with Pomata, disguised as a police commissioner, kidnapping Rossini and making him believe he is at the centre of a plot, taking him to a farmhouse outside the city.

Shortly before the race, Soldatino's former jockey, Stelvio Mazza, fed up with the lawyer de Marchis, who will not pay his arrears, refuses to ride the horse, and he is replaced by self-candid Pomata, a former jockey with a regular license. The race starts and everything seems to go well, until Mandrake, in the heat of the competition and trying not to make the farce evident, forgets to lose and rides Bernadette closer and closer to Soldatino, who is leading. Bernadette wins, arousing the ire of Mandrake's friends and lawyer.

The whole gang ends up in court. Here Mandrake tries to dissuade the judge with a gruelling speech on "who is" the horse-player in a broad sense and then ends with the request for total mental infirmity. Gabriella reveals that she secretly bet on the winning horse, but just when the sentence seems obvious, it turns out that the judge is a hardened bettor, and everyone is acquitted. Gabriella finally manages to marry Mandrake, who, with her tacit consent, escapes during the honeymoon to go to the hippodrome of Cesena.

== Cast ==
- Gigi Proietti as Bruno Fioretti, 'Mandrake', background actor
- Enrico Montesano as Armando Pellicci, 'Er Pomata', unemployed and gambler
- Catherine Spaak as Gabriella, Mandrake's girlfriend bar owner
- Mario Carotenuto as attorney De Marchis
- Francesco De Rosa as Felice Roversi a franelero
- Gigi Ballista as Count Dallara, stable owner
- Maria Teresa Albani as Fortune-teller
- Nikki Gentile (as Nicky Gentile) as Mafalda model and call girl
- Adolfo Celi as Judge
- Ennio Antonelli as Otello Rinaldi, the butcher, 'Manzotin'
- Luciano Bonanni as Fatebenefratelli Hospital's male nurse and horse gambler
- Aristide Caporale (as Aristide Caporali)
- Gianfranco Cardinali
- Giuseppe Castellano as Stelvio Mazza the Harness racing driver
- Renzo Ozzano as Jean Louis Rossini French harness racing champion driver
- Fernando Cerulli as TV commercial whisky "VAT 69" director
- Alberto Giubilo, famous Italian TV announcer of horse races, as himself

== Production ==
In the opening credits, Gigi Proietti is credited as Luigi Proietti, his full name. The actor has also stated that following Ghost Whisperer to film, he feared he would really take up the habit of gambling.

In the scene of whisky Vat69 spot the actor who plays the director (Fernando Cerulli) is voiced by Steno, while the driver without a license is voiced by Mario Lombardini.

== Sequel ==
The sequel was filmed in 2002, Febbre da cavallo - La mandrakata directed by Carlo Vanzina (son of Steno, whose real name was Stefano Vanzina), again starring Gigi Proietti.

== See also ==
- List of films about horses
- List of films about horse racing
