= Maurizio Pagnussat =

Italian television director (born 1955)

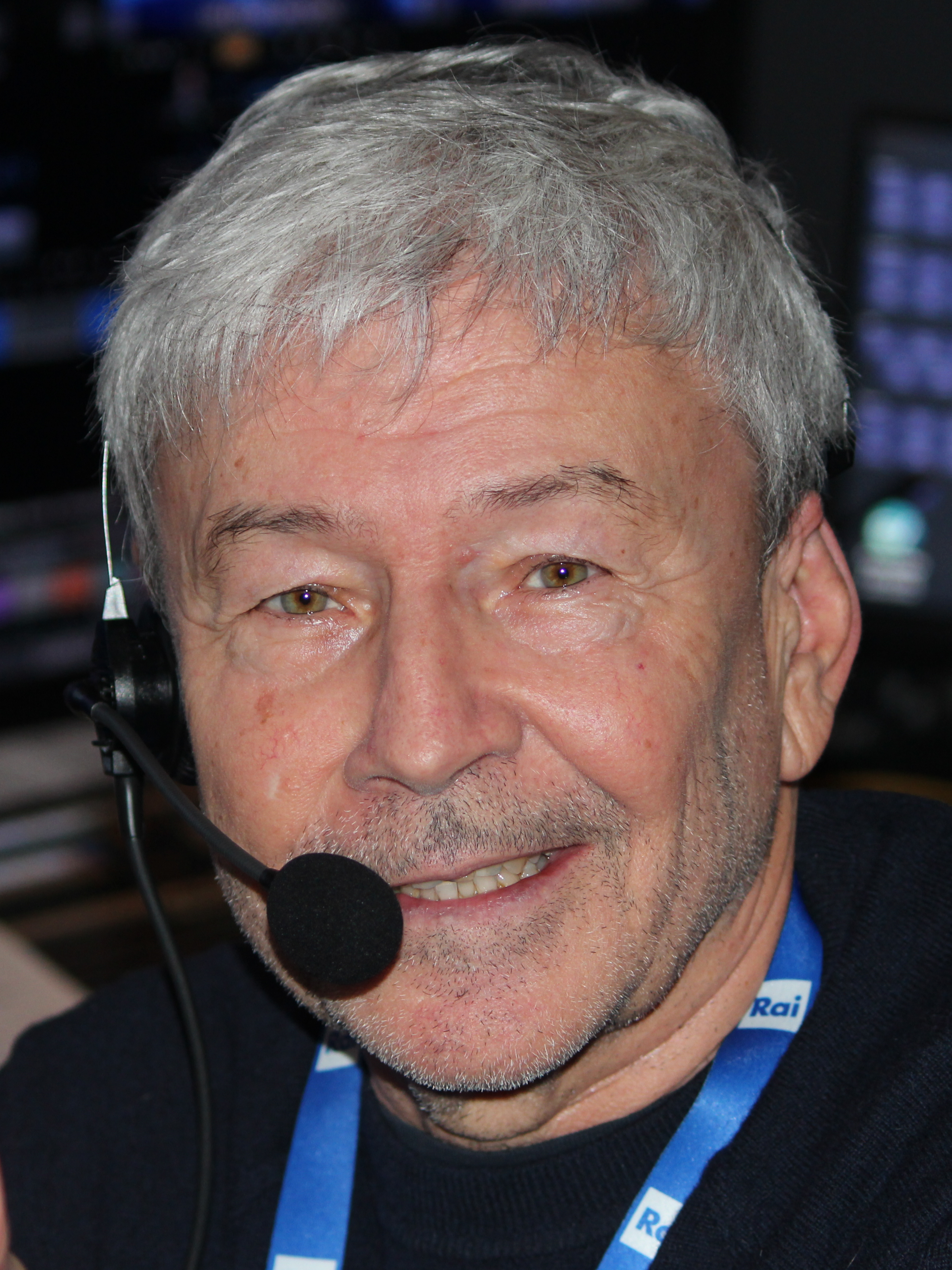
- Pagnussat directing the Sanremo Music Festival 2026
- Born: 19 August 1955 (age 70); Milan, Italy
- Occupation: Television director
- Years active: 1982–present

Maurizio Pagnussat (Italian pronunciation: [mauˈrittsjo paɲɲusˈsat]; born 19 August 1955) is an Italian television director.

== Career ==
A native of Milan, he started his career as a mixer for the 1982 edition of Premiatissima and for Buongiorno Italia, both on Canale 5.

During his career, he has worked on a wide range of TV programmes, including Bim Bum Bam, Il Quizzone, La sai l'ultima?, Verissimo, Alta tensione, L'eredità, Reazione a catena, L'anno che verrà, I migliori anni, La notte vola, La Corrida, Tale e quale show, Si può fare!, The Band, the Sanremo Music Festival, the David di Donatello Awards and Dalla strada al palco. Pagnussat has regularly worked with TV presenter Carlo Conti since Big!.

He was the director of the 2001 mini-series Gian Burrasca (a remake de the 1964 series), starring Rita Pavone, Gerry Scotti, Katia Ricciarelli and Duccio Cecchi. Since 2019, he has been directing Zecchino d'Oro.
