= Simone Mori (voice actor) =

Italian actor and voice actor (born 1965)

- Born: 18 November 1965 (age 60); Rome, Italy
- Occupations: Actor; voice actor; dialogue writer; dubbing director
- Years active: 1988–present
- Father: Renato Mori

Simone Mori (born 18 November 1965) is an Italian actor and voice actor.

== Biography ==
Born in Rome and the son of actor and voice actor Renato Mori, Simone Mori attended a theatre school in Rome and started his career on television during the late 1980s. His most long-lived television role was in the crime drama Romanzo criminale – La serie, but he is generally known to the Italian public as a voice actor. He voiced Ross Geller (portrayed by David Schwimmer) in the Italian-Language version of Friends and Warrick Brown (portrayed by Gary Dourdan) in the Italian-Language version of CSI: Crime Scene Investigation. He also dubbed Seth Rogen, John C. Reilly, Ice Cube and Omar Sy in a majority of their movies.

In Mori's animated roles, he dubbed Hermes Conrad in Futurama, Mantis in the Kung Fu Panda film series and he also performed the Italian voice of Shaggy Rogers in Scooby-Doo and the Alien Invaders. Another one of Mori's most popular dubbing roles include Crossbones in the Marvel Cinematic Universe.

In 2003, Mori started a career as a dubbing director.

== Filmography ==
=== Television ===
- Una lepre con la faccia di bambina - TV miniseries (1989)
- Classe di ferro - TV series (1989)
- Un commissario a Roma - TV series (1993)
- Carabinieri - TV series (2001)
- Romanzo criminale – La serie - TV series (2008–2010)
- La teoria del sangue - short film (2019)

== Dubbing roles ==
=== Animation ===
- Mr. Hare in The Animals of Farthing Wood
- Hermes Conrad in Futurama, Futurama: Bender's Big Score, Futurama: The Beast with a Billion Backs, Futurama: Bender's Game, Futurama: Into the Wild Green Yonder
- Police Officer Landers in Monster House
- Gutsy Smurf in The Smurfs, The Smurfs 2
- Chien-Po in Mulan II
- Vash the Stampede in Trigun, Trigun: Badlands Rumble
- Frank in Sausage Party
- Phillip in South Park
- Nash in The Good Dinosaur
- Scab in The Wild
- Alistair in Open Season 3
- Mantis in Kung Fu Panda, Kung Fu Panda 2, Kung Fu Panda 3, Kung Fu Panda: Legends of Awesomeness
- Reggie in Sherlock Gnomes

=== Live action ===
- Ross Geller in Friends
- Warrick Brown in CSI: Crime Scene Investigation
- Aaron Rapaport in The Interview
- Dale Doback in Step Brothers
- Nick Persons in Are We There Yet?
- Bakary "Driss" Bassari in The Intouchables
- Ira Wright in Funny People
- Cal Naughton Jr. in Talladega Nights: The Ballad of Ricky Bobby
- Benjamin Buford "Bubba" Blue in Forrest Gump
- James "Desolation" Williams in Ghosts of Mars
- Crossbones in Captain America: The Winter Soldier, Captain America: Civil War
- Varys in Game of Thrones

=== Video games ===
- Hermes Conrad in Futurama
