= Gigi Proietti =

Italian actor (1940–2020)

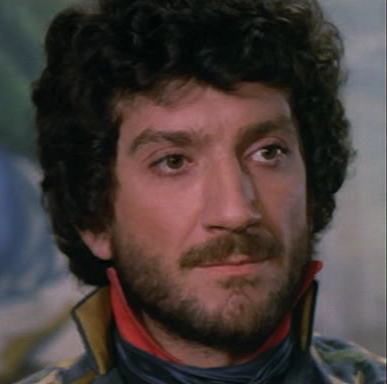
- Proietti in La Tosca (1973)
- Born: Luigi Proietti; 2 November 1940; Rome, Italy
- Died: 2 November 2020 (aged 80); Rome, Italy
- Occupations: Actor; voice actor; comedian; singer; director; transformist; television presenter
- Years active: 1955–2020
- Partner: Sagitta Alter (1962–2020)
- Children: 2
- Musical career
- Genres: Pop; cabaret
- Instruments: Vocals; guitar; piano; accordion; double bass
- Labels: RCA Italiana; BMG
- Website: www.gigiproietti.it

Luigi "Gigi" Proietti (2 November 1940 – 2 November 2020) was an Italian actor, dubber, comedian, singer and television presenter.

== Early life ==
He was born in Rome to Romano Proietti, originally from Umbria, and Giovanna Ceci, a housewife. During his youth, he was keen on singing and playing guitar, piano, accordion, and double bass at several Roman nightclubs. He enrolled in the Faculty of Law at La Sapienza University, where he attended the mimicry courses of the University Theatre Centre held by Giancarlo Cobelli, who immediately noticed his talent as a musician and booked him for an avantgarde play.

== Career ==
=== Acting ===
After several stage works, in 1966 Proietti debuted both in cinema, in Pleasant Nights, and on television, in the TV series I grandi camaleonti. His first personal success came in 1971, when he replaced Domenico Modugno in the stage musical Alleluja brava gente by Garinei & Giovannini, starring alongside Renato Rascel. In 1974, after playing the role of Neri Chiaramantesi in the drama La cena delle beffe, alongside Carmelo Bene and Vittorio Gassman, in 1976, he started a fruitful collaboration with playwright Roberto Lerici, with whom he wrote and directed his stage plays, starting with the one-man show A me gli occhi, please (Give me your eyes, please, 1976, reported on the scene in 1993, 1996 and 2000, in a memorable performance at the Olympic Stadium in his hometown). Initially planned to be performed 6 times, the show exceeded 300 performances, with an average audience of 2,000 per performance.

He took part in several international movies, including The Appointment (1969), directed by Sidney Lumet, A Wedding (1978), directed by Robert Altman, and Who Is Killing the Great Chefs of Europe? (1978), directed by Ted Kotcheff.

Proietti was also a voice dubber of films and television shows into the Italian language. He has dubbed the voices of actors such as Robert De Niro, Sylvester Stallone, Richard Burton, Richard Harris, Dustin Hoffman, Paul Newman, Charlton Heston and Marlon Brando. His credits also include the role of the Genie in the Italian version of the Aladdin film series and Draco in Dragonheart. He also provided the Italian voice of Gandalf in The Hobbit film series, replacing the late Gianni Musy, who dubbed Gandalf in The Lord of the Rings, as well as Sylvester from Looney Tunes during the 1960s.

=== Music ===
Proietti was interested in music from a young age. During his time singing in nightclubs and outdoor bars, he was initially not interested in pursuing an acting career. Proietti starred in and performed the opening and closing theme song for Il Circolo Pickwick which aired on Rai 1 in 1968 and at that time, he met Lucio Battisti, who was signed with the record label Dischi Ricordi.

In the mid-1990s, Proietti was a member of Trio Melody alongside Peppino di Capri and Stefano Palatresi. The group was only active from the Sanremo Music Festival 1995 until 1996 and they released only one album. Proietti also enjoyed a successful solo career and he released more than 11 albums and 15 singles.

== Personal life ==
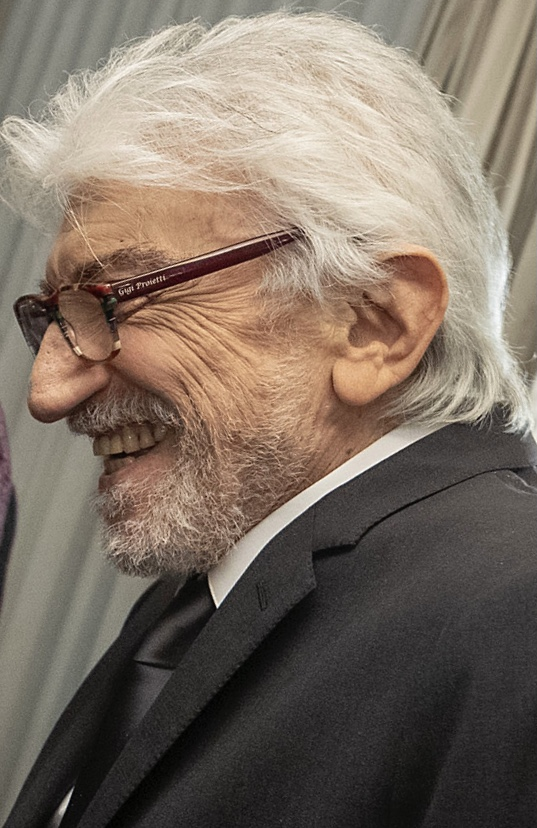
Proietti in 2020

Proietti had been in a relationship since 1962 with Swedish former tour guide Sagitta Alter, with whom he had two daughters, Susanna and Carlotta. His nephew Raffaele has followed him into a voice dubbing career.

== Death ==
On 1 November 2020, Proietti suffered a heart attack whilst in the hospital, having been admitted fifteen days prior for heart-related problems. He was transferred to intensive care where his condition was described as critical. Proietti died the following morning, in the early hours of 2 November 2020, the day of his 80th birthday.

After his death, the mayor of Rome, Virginia Raggi, arranged for the Silvano Toti Globe Theatre to be renamed after Proietti. Proietti's funeral took place on 5 November at the Church of the Artists. However, because of the COVID-19 pandemic, no more than 60 people were in attendance. Proietti was cremated at the Cimitero Flaminio and his ashes were placed at Campo Verano.

== Filmography ==
=== Cinema ===
Year	Title	Role(s)	Notes
1964	Let's Talk About Women	Omero	Feature film debut
1966	Pleasant Nights	Mario Di Colli	
1967	La ragazza del bersagliere	Cesare Bottazzi	
1967	Catch as Catch Can	Make up artist	Cameo appearance
1968	The Libertine	Sandro Maldini	
1969	A Complicated Girl	Pietro	
1969	The Appointment	Fabre	
1970	Brancaleone at the Crusades	Death / Pattume / Colombino	
1970	The Howl	Coso	
1970	Dropout	Cieco	
1971	Bubù	Giulio "the Thief"	
1971	Lady Liberty	Michele Bruni	
1972	Gli ordini sono ordini	Mario Pasini	
1972	Meo Patacca	Meo Patacca	
1973	La Tosca	Mario	
1973	Property Is No Longer a Theft	Paco	
1974	I'll Take Her Like a Father	Saverio Mazzaccolli	
1975	The Sex Machine	Enrico Nobili	
1976	House of Pleasure for Women	Ivanhoe Zuccoli	
1976	Chi dice donna dice donna	Filippo / Sonia	Segment: "Papà e maman"
1976	The Inheritance	Pippo Ferramonti	
1976	Febbre da cavallo	Bruno "Mandrake" Fioretti	
1976	Languid Kisses, Wet Caresses	Orfeo	
1977	Beach House	Gigi	
1978	A Wedding	Dino Corelli	
1978	Who Is Killing the Great Chefs of Europe?	Ravello	
1979	Happy Hobos	Albergatore	
1980	I Don't Understand You Anymore	Alberto Spinelli	
1982	Di padre in figlio	Himself	Cameo appearance
1983	"FF.SS." – Cioè: "...che mi hai portato a fare sopra a Posillipo se non mi vuoi più bene?"	Curtatone	
1985	Mi faccia causa	Luigi Marchetti	
1994	Revenge of the Musketeers	Giulio Mazarino	
1999	Dirty Linen	Rodolfo Melchiorri	
2002	Febbre da cavallo – La mandrakata	Bruno "Mandrake" Fioretti	
2004	The Jokes	Various roles	
2008	Un'estate al mare	Giulio Bonetti	
2009	Un'estate ai Caraibi	Alberto	
2010	La vita è una cosa meravigliosa	Claudio	
2011	All at Sea	Nino	
2011	Box Office 3D: The Filmest of Films	Mr. Silenzio	
2013	Guess Who's Coming for Christmas?	Leonardo Sereni	
2014	What's Your Sign?	Giuliano De Marchis	
2017	The Prize	Giovanni	
2019	Pinocchio	Mangiafuoco	
2021	Io sono Babbo Natale	Ettore Magni / Santa Claus	Posthumous release

=== Television ===
Year	Title	Role(s)	Network	Notes
1964	I grandi camaleonti	Moureau	Rai 1	Episode: "Episodio 8"
1965	La maschera e il volto	Luciano Spina	Rai 1	TV film
1967	Missione Wiesenthal	Dieter Von Wisliczeny	Rai 1	TV film
1968	Il circolo Pickwick	Jingle	Rai 1	4 episodes
1968	Piccoli borghesi	Nil	Rai 1	TV film
1968	Il mondo di Pirandello	Ciro Colli	Rai 1	Episode: "Camere d'affitto"
1970	La fantastica storia del Don Chisciotte della Mancia	Don Quixote	Rai 1	TV miniseries
1974	Sabato sera dalle nove alle dieci	Himself / Host	Rai 1	Variety show
1975	Fatti e fattacci	Himself / co-host	Rai 1	Variety/musical show
1981	Fregoli	Leopoldo Fregoli	Rai 1	Lead role
1982	Attore amore mio	Himself / Host	Rai 1	Variety show
1983–1984	Fantastico	Himself / Host	Rai 1	Variety show (season 4)
1985	Sogni e bisogni	Pompeo	Rai 2	Episode: "Micio micio"
1986	Io a modo mio	Himself / Host	Rai 1	Variety show
1987	American Playhouse	Unknown	PBS	Episode: "The Innocents Aboard"
1989	I 7 re di Roma	Romulus / Numa Pompilius / Tullus Hostilius / Ancus Marcius / Tarquinius Priscus / Servius Tullius / Tarquinius Superbus	Rai 1	TV film
1990	Villa Arzilla	The Gardener	Rai 2	Main role (also creator and director)
1990–1991	Club 92	Himself / co-host	Rai 2	Variety show
1992	Un figlio a metà	Sandro Giacomelli	Rai 2	TV film
1993–1994	Passioni	Fra' João	Canale 5	Lead role
1994	Italian Restaurant	Giulio Broccoli	Rai 1	Lead role (also creator and producer)
1996–2008	Il maresciallo Rocca	Marshal Giovanni Rocca	Rai 1	Lead role
1997	Un nero per casa	Lorenzo Paradisi	Canale 5	TV film
1997–2000	L'avvocato Porta	Lawyer Antonio Porta	Canale 5	Lead role
1998	Carramba! Che sorpresa	Himself / Guest	Rai 1	Also performer
1999	2000 Today	Himself / co-host	Rai 1	Special
2004	Mai storie d'amore in cucina	Marcello	Rai 1	TV film
2005	Il veterinario	Gigi Carulli	Rai 1	TV film
2010	Saint Philip Neri: I Prefer Heaven	Philip Neri	Rai 1	TV miniseries
2013	L'ultimo Papa Re	Romeo Colombo da Priverno	Rai 1	TV film
2014–2018	Una pallottola nel cuore	Bruno Palmieri	Rai 1	Lead role
2015	Tale e quale show	Himself / Judge	Rai 1	Talent show (season 5)

== Voice work ==
Year	Title	Role	Notes
1993	Mille bolle blu	Narrator	
2000	Chi ha paura...?	Yorick	Animated film
2012	Stelle	Narrator	Short film

=== Dubbing ===
==== Films (Animation, Italian dub) ====
Year	Title	Role(s)	Ref
1992	Aladdin	Genie	
1994	The Return of Jafar	Genie	
1996	Aladdin and the King of Thieves	Genie	
1998	Quest for Camelot	Devon and Cornwall	
2011	Happy Feet Two	Bryan	

==== Films (Live action, Italian dub) ====
Year	Title	Role(s)	Original actor	Ref
1966	Who's Afraid of Virginia Woolf?	George	Richard Burton	
1966	Any Wednesday	Cass Henderson	Dean Jones	
1966	La Grande Vadrouille	Augustin Bouvet	Bourvil	
1967	Action Man	Jim Beckley	Robert Stack	
1967	Lucky, the Inscrutable	Lucky	Ray Danton	
1967	Reflections in a Golden Eye	Major Weldon Penderton	Marlon Brando	
1967	Camelot	King Arthur	Richard Harris	
1967	The Producers	Lorenzo St. DuBois	Dick Shawn	
1967	Death Rides a Horse	Walcott	Luigi Pistilli	
1967	The Hellbenders	Jeff	Gino Pernice	
1968	Firecreek	Bob Larkin	Henry Fonda	
1968	Danger: Diabolik	Inspector Ginko	Michel Piccoli	
1968	The Stalking Moon	Sam Varner	Gregory Peck	
1968	The Girl Who Couldn't Say No	Franco	George Segal	
1969	The Undefeated	Colonel James Langdon	Rock Hudson	
1970	Julius Caesar	Mark Antony	Charlton Heston	
1970	A Man Called Horse	John Morgan / Shunkawakan	Richard Harris	
1970	There Was a Crooked Man...	Paris Pitman Jr.	Kirk Douglas	
1973	Mean Streets	John "Johnny Boy" Civello	Robert De Niro	
1974	Lenny	Lenny Bruce	Dustin Hoffman	
1976	Salon Kitty	Helmut Wallenberg	Helmut Berger	
1976	Buffalo Bill and the Indians, or Sitting Bull's History Lesson	Buffalo Bill	Paul Newman	
1976	The Last Tycoon	Monroe Stahr	Robert De Niro	
1976	Fellini's Casanova	Giacomo Casanova	Donald Sutherland	
1976	Rocky	Rocky Balboa	Sylvester Stallone	
1978	F.I.S.T.	Johnny Kovak	Sylvester Stallone	
1993	The Visitors	Godefroy de Montmirail	Jean Reno	
1995	Casino	Sam "Ace" Rothstein	Robert De Niro	
1996	Dragonheart	Draco	Sean Connery	
1996	Hamlet	Player King	Charlton Heston	
2012	Hitchcock	Alfred Hitchcock	Anthony Hopkins	
2012	The Hobbit: An Unexpected Journey	Gandalf	Ian McKellen	
2013	The Hobbit: The Desolation of Smaug	Gandalf	Ian McKellen	
2014	The Hobbit: The Battle of the Five Armies	Gandalf	Ian McKellen	
2019	Aladdin	The Sultan	Navid Negahban	
2019	The Art of Racing in the Rain	Enzo	Kevin Costner	

==== Television (Animation, Italian dub) ====
Year	Title	Role(s)	Notes	Ref
1960–1970	Looney Tunes	Sylvester	Main cast; 1960s redubs	
1960–1970	Merrie Melodies	Sylvester	Main cast; 1960s redubs	

== Honors ==
- On 30 September 2013, Proietti received honorary citizenship from the city of Viterbo.
- On 14 May 2021, asteroid 7916 Gigiproietti, discovered by astronomers Henri Debehogne and Giovanni de Sanctis at ESO's La Silla Observatory in 1981, was named by the Working Group for Small Bodies Nomenclature in his memory.

=== Awards and nominations ===
- Nastro d'Argento Awards
  - 1997: Nastro d'Argento for Best Male Dubbing for dubbing Robert De Niro in Casino
  - 2003: Nastro d'Argento for Best Actor for Febbre da cavallo - La mandrakata
  - 2018: Nastro d'Argento Lifetime Achievement Award
