= Baba Yaga (1973 film) =

1973 Italian-French film by Corrado Farina

- Italian film poster
- Directed by: Corrado Farina
- Screenplay by: Corrado Farina
- Based on: Valentina by Guido Crepax
- Starring: Carroll Baker; Isabelle De Funès; George Eastman; Ely Galleani; Daniela Balzaretti; Mario Mattia Giorgetti; Sergio Masieri; Angela Covello
- Cinematography: Aiace Parolin
- Edited by: Giulio Berruti
- Music by: Piero Umiliani
- Production companies: 14 Luglio Cinematografica; Productions Simone Allouche
- Distributed by: Jumbo Cinematografica
- Release date: 1973 (Italy)
- Running time: 90 minutes
- Countries: Italy; France
- Language: Italian

Baba Yaga (also known as Kiss Me, Kill Me) is a 1973 horror film directed by Corrado Farina based on the Guido Crepax Valentina comic series. The film stars Carroll Baker, Isabelle De Funès and George Eastman. The subject is Valentina Rosselli, a Milanese photographer, who meets a middle-aged seductress who inexplicably calls herself "Baba Yaga."

== Plot ==
Valentina Rosselli is a Milanese photographer with a knack for controversial shoots. Her friend and lover, Arno, is a director. One night, on her way home, Valentina gets struck by a car driven by a middle-aged blonde. She introduces herself as "Baba Yaga" and tells Valentina their meeting was pre-ordained. After she drives Valentina home, she snatches the clip from her garter belt, saying she needs a personal object from her and that she will return it tomorrow. Intrigued and disturbed Valentina crashes for the night and has a series of strange and vivid dreams. As promised, Baba Yaga returns Valentina's garter clip the next day. She fondles a camera Valentina uses and invites her to her old home to take some photographs. Valentina visits the woman's house where she is given a doll dressed in bondage gear. Valentina's life suddenly becomes full of strange occurrences. After discovering Baba Yaga is somehow responsible for that, Valentina decides to go back to her house and confront her.

== Cast ==
- Carroll Baker as Baba Yaga
- Isabelle De Funès as Valentina Rosselli
- George Eastman as Arno Treves
- Ely Galleani as Annette, the doll
- Angela Covello as Toni
- Mario Mattia Giorgetti as Carlo
- Daniela Balzaretti as Romina
- Sergio Masieri as Sandro

== Production ==
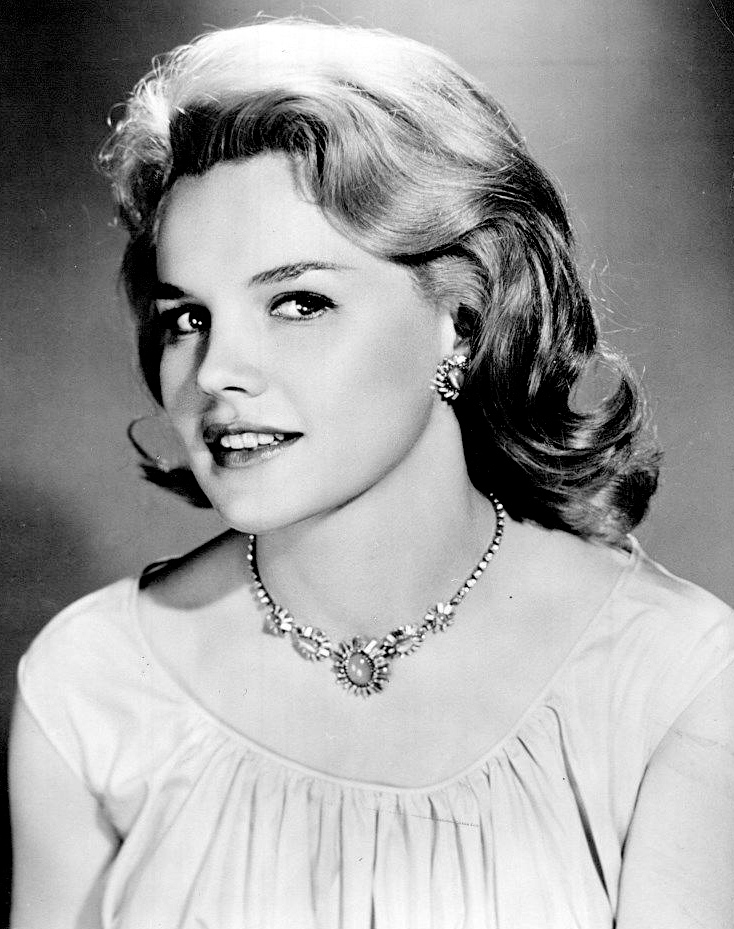
Baker played the role of Baba Yaga after Anne Heywood left the project during shooting.

Baba Yaga was an adaptation of Guido Crepax's comic series Valentina. Crepax had previously done film work with Tinto Brass who commissioned him to create the storyboards for his thriller film Deadly Sweet. Brass had at one point considered adapting the story La forza di gravità from the Valentina comics to a film, but abandoned the idea when he felt that it would be impossible to portray Crepax's visual sensibilities to a film. Director Corrado Farina had admired Crepax's work, going as far to make a short documentary film Freud a fumetti (1970) which explored his comics. Farina noted that he had been disappointed by other works based on comics as "none of the filmmakers who embarked on that task had been able to deepen the relationship between the language of comics and that of film." Farina decided to explore the fantastical elements of Crepax's comics as opposed to the more erotic overtones.

During pre-production Farina signed a deal with producer Turi Vasile, which led him to Franco Committeri who later took over for Vasile as the film's financial backer. Farina made changes to the script by removing the character Philip Rembrandt and turning a small character in the comic, that of film director Arno Treves into a role as large as Valentina. After finishing the script, Committeri left the project after the release of Marco Bellocchio's Slap the Monster on Page One (1972). Farina had to find a new producer, and eventually signed with a company called 14 luglio Cinematografica. A French film production company is also credited, but this was predominantly done for tax reasons. The French connections eventually led to the casting of Isabelle De Funès as Valentina. Farina was not happy with her in the role, as his first choice had been Elsa Martinelli. He eventually had to choose between De Funès and Stefania Casini. The director initially had wanted the popular Italian singer Ornella Vanoni for the role of Baba Yaga in the film. He eventually cast Anne Heywood who left the project as shooting began. This led to Farina casting Carroll Baker in haste. George Eastman was cast as Arno. Farina was unfamiliar with the actor at the time but found that "he proved to be fit for the role. He had the right looks.".

After completing shooting and post-production on the film, Farina left for a vacation. On returning, he found that producers, finding the film too slow, had edited nearly half an hour out of it. The cuts made to this film were done on the negative of the film, making Farina lose his original edit of Baba Yaga. Farina was furious and threatened to take his name off the film. With the help of assistant director Giuilio Berruti, they tried to re-edit Baba Yaga but since the original version was lost, they could not complete it per their original idea.

== Release ==
Before Baba Yaga's release in Italy, the Italian Board of Censors ordered two cuts: the first being a long shot of De Funes full frontal nudity and the moment where Baker undresses before Valentina. Baba Yaga was released in Italy in 1973. Film historian and critic Roberto Curti stated that the film had poor box-office results due to bad distribution in Italy.

The film was shown as the 1973 Trieste Science Fiction Festival. Baba Yaga was released in the United States on DVD and Blu-Ray by Blue Underground.

== Reception ==
=== Box office ===
Baba Yaga underperformed at the Italian box office and was regarded as a "disappointment."

=== Critical response ===
Curti noted that most critics panned the film. In a contemporary review, Geoff Brown (Monthly Film Bulletin) reviewed an 81-minute dubbed version of the film. Brown noted that due to 20 minutes of the film being cut and through the English-language dub, the film had lost some of Farina's socio-political arguments". Brown noted that most of these comments however are brought down to "modish chit-chat" ranging through ideas that Valentina preferred Laurel & Hardy to Jean-Luc Godard. Brown's review noted that the film was an "airily directed horror-and-sex tale in the Bava tradition" and that it could "hold its own with ease" and that the film "looks as thought it may be swallowed up by its surface of esoteric chic. The movie's backbone of mainstream horror just about pulls it through."

From retrospective reviews, Danny Shipka, who discussed this film in his book on European exploitation films, noted that the film is "never uninteresting and the comic book style in which many of the scenes, especially the sex scenes are filmed is well handled" as well as that it was "not altogether successful mix of Guido Crepax's Italian comic book genius and European exploitation", concluding that it "seems to be lacking the "spark" that made the comic books so memorable." Film critic and horror author Kim Newman referred to the film as "enormously boring". TV Guide referred to the film as an "exceptionally handsome example of 1970s Italian pop-exploitation filmmaking sweetened by Piero Umilani's lounge-jazz score," and praised Baker's performance, but noted that she was "physically wrong for the role; her elaborate lace-and-beribboned costumes sometimes make her look more like a fleshy Miss Havisham than a sleekly predatory sorceress".

== Bibliography ==
- Curti, Roberto (2016). Diabolika: Supercriminals, Superheroes and the Comic Book Universe in Italian Cinema. Midnight Marquee Press. ISBN 978-1-936168-60-6.
- Curti, Roberto (2017). Italian Gothic Horror Films, 1970-1979. Jefferson, North Carolina: McFarland. ISBN 978-1-476-66469-9.
- Newman, Kim (2011). Nightmare Movies: Horror on Screen Since the 1960s. Bloomsbury Publishing. ISBN 978-1-4088-1750-6.
- Shipka, Danny (2011). Perverse Titillation: The Exploitation Cinema of Italy, Spain and France, 1960–1980. McFarland. ISBN 978-0-7864-4888-3.
