= Roberto Della Casa =

Italian actor (born 1942)

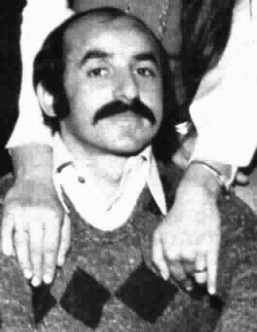
- Roberto Della Casa (1972)
- Born: 14 October 1942 (age 83); Rome, Italy
- Occupation: Actor
- Years active: 1970-present

Roberto Della Casa (born 14 October 1942) is an Italian actor. He appeared in more than sixty films since 1970.

== Selected filmography ==
Year	Title	Role	Notes
2012	To Rome with Love		
1995	Snowball		
1991	The Raffle		
1986	Il commissario Lo Gatto		
1983	Occhio, malocchio, prezzemolo e finocchio		
1983	Pappa e ciccia		
1983	Vacanze di Natale		
1983	Petomaniac		
1982	Il tifoso, l'arbitro e il calciatore		
1981	Fracchia la belva umana		
1980	I Hate Blondes		
1980	La locandiera		
1980	Fico d'India		
1979	Lobster for Breakfast		
1976	Perdutamente tuo... mi firmo Macaluso Carmelo fu Giuseppe		
