= Demetra Hampton =

American actress (born 1968)

- Born: Demetra Lisa Ann Hampton; June 15, 1968 (age 57); Philadelphia, Pennsylvania, U.S.
- Occupation: Actress
- Years active: 1988–present
- Spouse: Luca Bielli (m. 1998)

Demetra Lisa Ann Hampton (born June 15, 1968) is an American actress. She is best known for portraying the title role in the Italian television series Valentina.

Born in Philadelphia, Pennsylvania, Hampton began her career as a model in New York City, before being chosen for the character and moving to Italy. She went on to appear in 1990s films such as Three Columns in the News, Kreola, National Lampoon's Last Resort and Chicken Park. In 2001, after working on the film, Gabriel, Hampton went on a hiatus from acting until 2012 when she appeared in the Italian comedy, Good as You.

== Career ==
Former gymnast, Hampton began her career in New York City where she worked as a model. While on vacation in Los Angeles, an Italian film agent who was casting the television series Valentina (1989) and was looking for an actress to portray the main character. She took photos of Hampton and sent them to the producer Angelo Rizzoli. Hampton was sent to Milan the next day and was immediately cast in role of Valentina.

== Personal life ==
From 1994 to 1998 Hampton was romantically linked to an Italian politician Walter Armanini. In January 1998, she had a domestic accident which left her with fractured ankles after falling out of the balcony. The police stated it was a "suicide attempt for love". However, Hampton has denied the voluntary nature of the act.

== Filmography ==
- Valentina (1989)
- Three Columns in the News (1990)
- Saint Tropez, Saint Tropez (1992)
- Kreola (1993)
- Red Shoe Diaries: "The Psychiatrist" (1994)
- National Lampoon's Last Resort (1994)
- Chicken Park (1994)
- Upright Affair (1998)
- Vampire Blues (1999)
- Gabriel (2001)
- Good as You (2012)
