= Guido Crepax =

Italian comics artist (1933–2003)

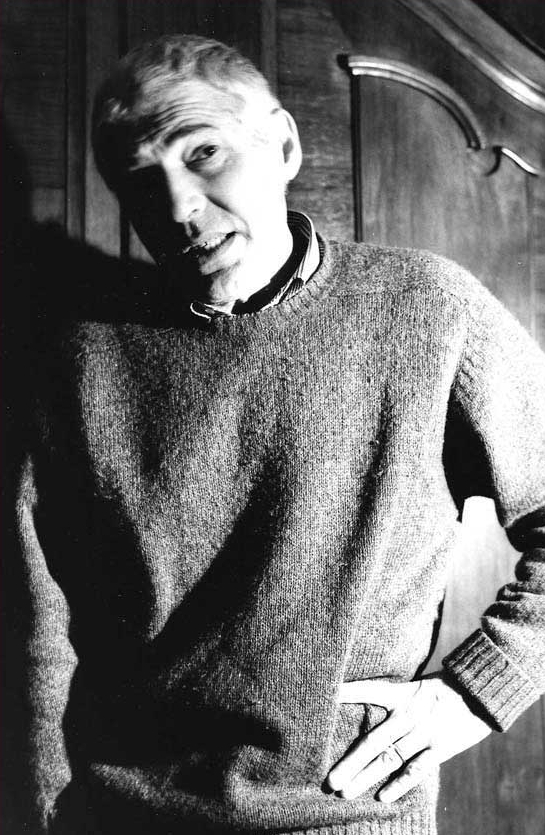
- Crepax in 1993
- Born: Guido Crepas; 15 July 1933 Milan, Italy
- Died: 31 July 2003 (aged 70) Milan, Italy
- Areas: Artist, writer
- Notable works: Valentina; Anita; Histoire d'O; Belinda; Bianca
- Awards: Torre Guinigi d'oro (1967); Yellow Kid Award (1972); Adamson Award (1972); Jack Kirby Hall of Fame (2001)

Guido Crepax (15 July 1933 – 31 July 2003) was an Italian comics artist. He is most famous for his character Valentina, created in 1965 and very representative of the spirit of the 1960s. The Valentina series of books and strips became noted for Crepax's sophisticated drawing, and for the psychedelic, dreamlike storylines, generally involving a strong dose of eroticism. His work was often politically motivated too, inspired by his Communist convictions. A film based on his work called Baba Yaga, featuring the character Valentina, was made in 1973.

== Works ==
=== Valentina stories ===
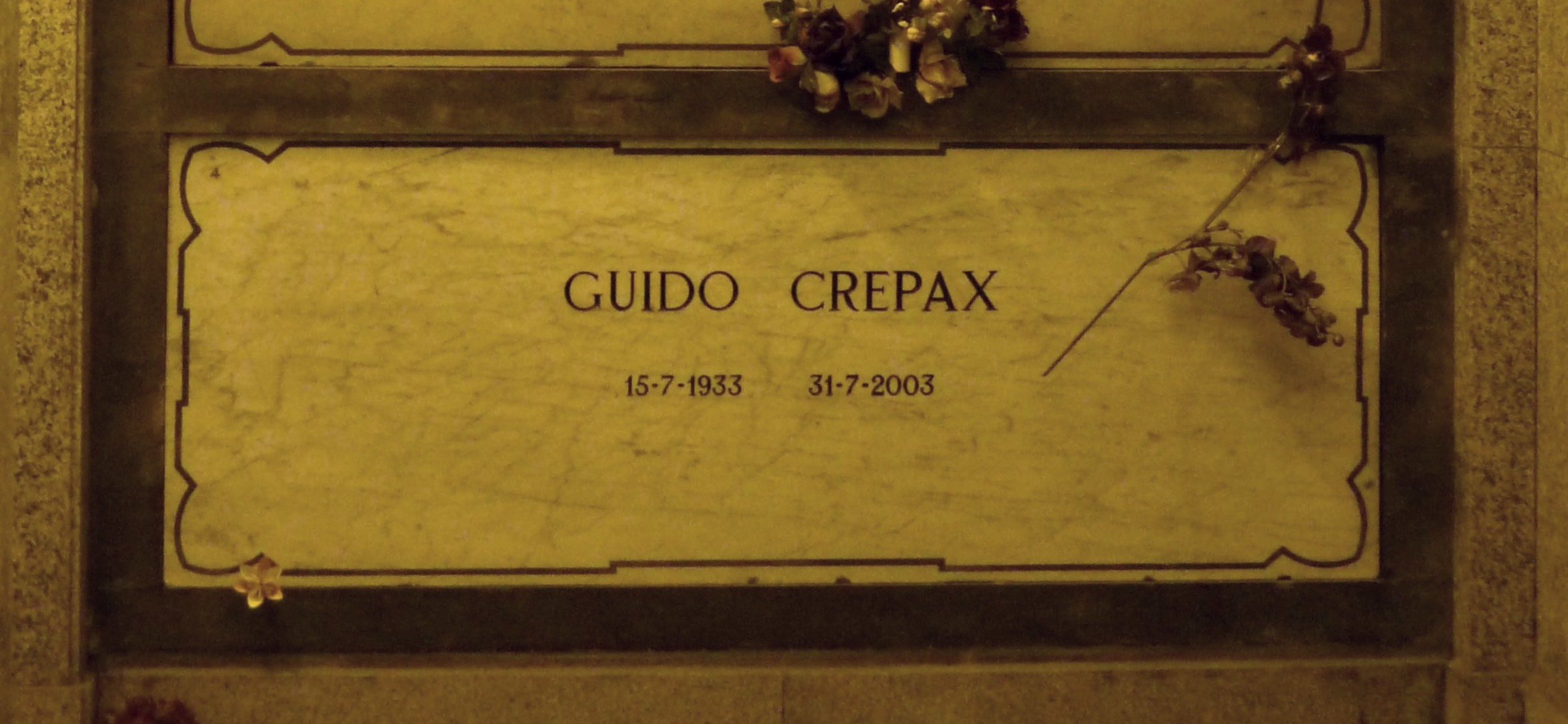
Crepax's grave at the Monumental Cemetery of Milan

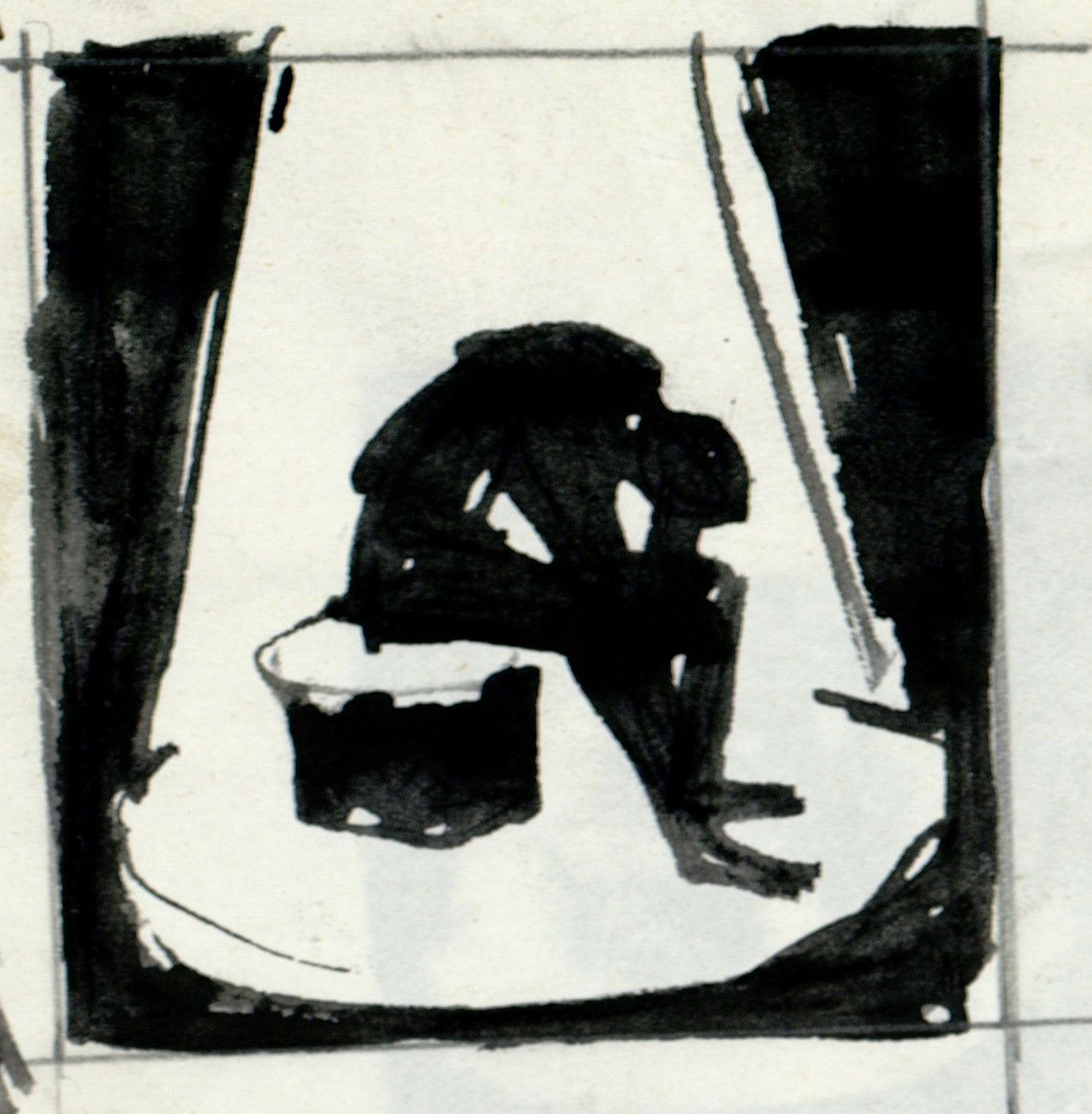
- Disegno per copertina di libretto, drawing for Count Down. Archivio Storico Ricordi
  The Lesmo Curve (1965)
- The Subterraneans (1965; revised in 1968)
- The Descent (1966)
- Un Poco Loco (1966)
- Ciao, Valentina (1966)
- The Force of Gravity (1967)
- Funny Valentine (1967)
- Prelude to The Subterraneans (The Hussars of Death) (1968)
- Valentina in Sovietland (1968)
- Valentina in Boots (1968)
- Marianna in the Country (1968)
- Fearless Paper Doll Valentina (1968)
- Filippo and Valentina (1969)
- Valentina's Baby (1969)
- The Manuscript Found in a Stroller (1970)
- Baba Yaga (1971)
- Bluebeard (1971)
- Who's Afraid of Baba Yaga? (1971)
- Valentina the Fearless (1971)
- Annette (1972)
- The Little King (1972)
- Pietro Giacomo Rogeri (1972)
- The Time Eater (1973)
- Fallen Angels (1973)
- The Empress's New Clothes (1973)
- Reflection (1974)
- Private Life (1975)
- Subconscious Valentina (1976)
- Valentina the Pirate (1976)
- Rembrandt and the Witches (1977)
- Anthropology (1977)
- Le Zattere, Venice (1980)

=== Other heroines ===
- La casa matta (feat. Bianca, 1969), Edip
- Anita, una storia possibile (1972), Persona/Ennio Ciscato Editore
- Histoire d'O (1975), Franco Maria Ricci Editore, from the novel by Pauline Réage
- Emmanuelle (1978), Olympia Press, from the novel by Emmanuelle Arsan
- Justine (1979), Olympia Press, from the novel La nouvelle Justine by de Sade
- Hello, Anita! (1980), L'isola trovata, in colour
- Belinda 1 & 2 (1983), Editori del Grifo
- I viaggi di Bianca (1984), Milano Libri, inspired by Jonathan Swift's Gulliver's Travels
- Venere in pelliccia (1984), Olympia Press, inspired to a tale by Leopold von Sacher-Masoch.
- Bianca 2. Odesseda (1987), Editori del Grifo
- Emmanuelle l'antivergine (1990), Rizzoli
- Eroine alla fine: Salomé (2000), Lizard Edizioni
- Crepax 60|70 (feat. Belinda, and Valentina 2003), Fiction inc. Tokyo

=== Other works ===
- L'astronave pirata (1968), Rizzoli
- Il dottor Jekill (1972), Persona/Ennio Ciscato Editore
- Circuito interno (1977), Edizioni Tempo Medico
- Casanova (1977), Franco Maria Ricci Editore
- L'uomo di Pskov (1977), CEPIM (Sergio Bonelli Editore), in colour
- L'uomo di Harlem (1979), CEPIM (Sergio Bonelli Editore)
- La calata di Macsimiliano XXXVI (1984), Editori del Grifo
- Conte Dracula (1987), Rizzoli-Milano Libri, from the novel Dracula by Bram Stoker
- Dr.Jekyll e Mr.Hide (1987), Rizzoli-Milano Libri, from the novel by Robert Louis Stevenson
- Giro di vite (1989), Olympia Press, from the novel The Turn of the Screw by Henry James
- Nessuno (1990), Milano Libri
- Le clinicommedie (1990), Editiemme
- Il processo di Franz Kafka (1999), Piemme, from the novel The Trial by Franz Kafka
- Justine and The Story of O (2000), graphic novel of the works by Marquis de Sade and Anne Desclos respectively
- Frankenstein (2002), Grifo Edizioni, from the novel by Mary Shelley

=== Wargames ===
Besides his much better known activity as a graphic artist, Crepax was a keen wargamer and wargame designer and collector of paper soldiers, drawn by himself. He was the author of some of the first wargames published in Italy to be widely circulated:

- La Battaglia di Trafalgar (Corriere dei Piccoli, 1964)
- La Battaglia di Waterloo (Linus, 1965)
- La Battaglia di Pavia (Linus, 1967)
- La Battaglia del Lago Ghiacciato - Alexandr Nevsky (Linus 1972, poi ristampato da Milano Libri)

== Other activities ==
He was also active as an animator and as an album cover designer.

== See also ==
- Fernando Carcupino
- Hugo Pratt
- Dino Battaglia
- Damiano Damiani
- Milo Manara
- Italian comics
