= Giorgio Capitani =

Italian film director

- Born: 29 December 1927; Paris, France
- Died: 25 March 2017 (aged 89); Viterbo, Italy
- Occupations: Film director Screenwriter
- Years active: 1949–2017

Giorgio Capitani (29 December 1927 – 25 March 2017) was an Italian film director and screenwriter. He directed 40 films between 1954 and 2012. He also wrote for 12 films. He was born in Paris, France.

== Filmography ==
=== Director ===
==== Cinema ====
* Delirio (co-directed by "Pierre Billon" (1954))
- Piscatore 'e Pusilleco (1954)
- Il piccolo vetraio (1955)
- La trovatella di Milano (1956)
- Donne senza paradiso – La storia di San Michele (( Axel Munthe – The Doctor of San Michele ), co-authored by "Rudolf Jugert" (1962))
- Ercole, Sansone, Maciste e Ursus gli invincibili (1964)
- Che notte, ragazzi! (1966)
- Ognuno per sé signed under the pseudonym George Holloway (1968)
- La notte è fatta per... rubare (1968)
- L'arcangelo (1969)
- La schiava io ce l'ho e tu no (1973)
- La pupa del gangster (1975)
- Bruciati da cocente passione (1976)
- Pane, burro e marmellata (1977)
- Io tigro, tu tigri, egli tigra ((second and third episode), with "Paolo Villaggio" and "Enrico Montesano" (1978))
