= 1994 in Italian television =

This is a list of events relating to Italian television in 1994.

== Events ==
=== RAI ===
After the victory of the center-right at the center-right coalition at the general elections, the experiment of a RAI free from politics ends, and a new form of spoils system is born (still in force): pro-government RAI 1, right-wing RAI 2, left-wing RAI.

- 23 January: three RAI journalists (war correspondent Marco Luchetta and cameramen Alessandro Ota and Dario D'Angelo) are killed by a mortar shell during the siege of Mostar.
- 26 February: two blind singers win the Sanremo Music festival, hosted by Pippo Baudo: Aleandro Baldi the official contest with Passerà and Andrea Bocelli the New proposals section with Il mare calmo della sera.
- 20 March: the TG3 reporter Ilaria Alpi and the cameramen Miran Hrovatin were killed in an ambush in Mogadiscio, while they were covering the operation Restore Hope. Those responsible for the killing have yet to be identified. The killing is widely believed to have been due to Alpi's enquiries about the arms trade and toxic waste traffic.
- 21 March: the first edition of TG3 Mattino, the RAI morning news program, is aired; it lasts from 6 to 8 AM, in competition with TG5 Prima Pagina, by Fininvest
- 30 June: the RAI board of directors (the so-called “professors”), accused by Minister Giuliano Ferrara of mismanagement and partiality towards the left, resigns.
- 12 July: the new board of directors (near to the center-right coalition) elects Letizia Moratti RAI president; 2 August Gianni Billa is nominated general director. In the following months, the directors of the three RAI networks and news programs were also replaced with men closer to the new government.
- 13 July: the match Bulgaria vs Italy, semifinal of the 1994 FIFA world cup, is the most seen program of the year, with 25,8 million viewiers.
- 6 August: on RAI, a commercial of the Presidency of the Council of Ministers is aired; it exalts the work of the Berlusconi cabinet with the slogan "Fatto!" (We have done it) The campaign is suspended due to the intervention of AGCOM.
- 20 September: strike of the RAI journalists against the new board of directors. The reorganization of RAI arouses, beside the harsh protests of the left opposition, the discontent of Lega Nord, member of the government coalition, which felt penalized.
- 15 December : Chamber of Deputies, establishes, with the votes of Lega Nord and of the left opposition, a special commission, which takes away the competences in the field of TV from the Culture Commission, chaired by Vittorio Sgarbi. The debate is very heated, and Sgarbi insults heavily the Chamber president Irene Pivetti.

=== Fininvest ===
When Silvio Berlusconi entries into politics, Fininvest becomes a formidable propaganda machine for its editor. He enjoys the acritical support by Emilio Fede's TG4 (soon proverbial for its partiality) and Paolo Liguori's Studio aperto, by columnists as Vittorio Sgarbi and too by entertainment stars as Ambra Angiolini, who declares live: “Devil votes for Occhetto, but the Almighty votes for Berlusconi.” Only Enrico Mentana's TG5 and Maurizio Costanzo serve a formally neutral attitude.

- 6 January: Emilio Fede asks live for the resignation of Indro Montanelli from the direction of Il Giornale, reproaching him for not supporting the political projects of his publisher Silvio Berlusconi; similar and more violent attacks had been made previously by Sgarbi. Montanelli responded contemptuously, but on 11 January he's forced to resign.
- 26 January: Silvio Berlusconi announced through a pre-recorded television message, lasting nine minutes and sent to all the news programs of the national television networks, his entry into politics by leading the newly nascent Forza Italia, with which he ran for office in the elections policies of that same year.
- 23 March: Canale 5 broadcasts, in the program Braccio di ferro, a pre-election debate between Silvio Berlusconi (leader of Forza Italia and candidate premier of the center-right coalition) and Achille Occhetto (secretary of PDS); Berlusconi clearly outclasses his opponent. The debate gets nine and a half million viewers, a record for a political program in Italy. Five day later, Berlusconi triumphs at the general election.
- April: Berlusconi, now Prime Minister, leaves the chair of Fininvest President to Fedele Confalonieri .
- 7 December: the Constitutional Court repeals the article of the Mammì law that allow the possession of three television channels by a single private owner.
- 15 December: while the Berlusconi cabinetis is in crisis, TG5 broadcasts an opinion poll, carried out with the Televoting technique, according to which 71% of Italians would like a new government with the same prime minister. The news program and its director, Enrico Mentana, are accused of partisanship.

=== Other channels ===
- March : the ADES group, owned, by Giampiero Ades, buys from Fininvest the syndication Italia 7.

== Awards ==
11. Telegatto award, for the season 1993-1994.

- Show of the year: Stranamore.
- Man and woman of the year: Fiorello and Mara Venier; Ambra Angiolini as revelation of the year
- Best TV movie: Donna d’onore 2.
- Best serial: Amico mio (for Italy), Beverly Hills 90210 (for abroad) and Columbo (as cult serial).
- Best soap opera: The bold and the Beautiful.
- Best spot: SIP.
- Best quiz: La ruota della fortuna.
- Best variety: Scherzi a parte.
- Best talk show: Maurizio Costanzo Show.
- Best music show: Roxy bar.
- Best magazine: Funari news.
- Best sport magazine: Quelli che ... il calcio.
- Best show for children: Fantaghirò 3.
- Special awards: Mi manda Lubrano (for the service TV), Magnum P. I. (cult program), Mr. Giorgio Tronca (reader of Sorrisi e Canzoni), Alberto Sordi (for the cinema in TV) and Corrado (for the fifty years of career).

== Debuts ==
=== RAI ===
==== Variety ====
- Beato tra le donne – Italian version of Man o Man, hosted by Paolo Bonolis and others; 7 seasons (3 on RAI, 4 on Mediaset).
- Numero uno – game show, hosted by Pippo Baudo; 3 seasons.
- Luna park - daily game show aired in the access prime time, ideated by Pippo Baudo and with various hosts (Baudo himself, Fabrizio Frizzi, Milly Carlucci and others) ; 3 seasons.
- Sanremo Top – musical show, comparing the results of Sanremo festival with the ones of Italian hit-parade a month later; again on air.
- Se io fossi... Sherlock Holmes – game show with Jocelyn Hattab; the contenders must discover the owner of a lost object, 2 seasons (one on TMC).

==== News and educational ====
- Report – enquiry magazine with Milena Gabanelli, then with Sigfrido Ranucci; again on air.
- Tempo reale – political talk show, with Michele Santoro; 2 seasons.
- Dove sono i Pirenei ? (Where the Pyrenees are?) – talk show, with Rosanna Cancellieri and Francesco Bortolini; 2 seasons.
- TG2 Salute – medicine magazine, by Luciano Onder; 14 seasons.
- MediaMente – magazine about Internet, with Carlo Massarini, lasted till 2002.
- Misteri (Mysteries) – program about paranormal events and pseudoscience, hosted by Lorenza Foschini; 5 seasons.
- Storie maledette (Cursed stories) – true crime program, ideated and hosted by Franca Leosini; 17 seasons.
- Lina blu – travel program about the Italian seas, hosted by Puccio Corona and Donatella Bianchi; again on air.
- Verde mattina – magazine about green world, with Luca Sardella and Jamira Majello; 5 seasons.

==== For children ====
- Solletico with Mauro Serio and Elisabetta Ferracini, lasted till 2000.

=== Finivenst ===
==== Variety ====
- Trenta ore per la vita (Thirty hours for life) – yearly fundraising event, hosted by Lorella Cuccarini and Marco Columbro; lasted till 2024.
- Stranamore (Strangelove) – reality show, hosted by Alberto Castagna and Emanuela Foliero, Italian version of the Dutch All you need is love; 14 seasons. Castagna tours Italy in a camper, carrying love video-messages and trying to reconcile couples in crisis; the show, ravaged by critics for its blatant sentimentality, gets the same an extraordinary public success.
- Stelle a quattro zampe (Four pawned stars) – contest of dogs, with various host; 12 editions.
- Grandi magazzini – tele-marketing program, hosted by Mike Bongiorno; 2 seasons.
- Il quizzone – Italian version of the Japanese Show by Shobai, with Gerry Scotti and Amadeus; 2 seasons.
- Jammin – music show, hosted by Federica Panicucci and other female hosts; 7 seasons.
- Viva Napoli – music show hosted by Mike Bongiorno; 9 seasons.

===== Talent show =====
- 14 December - Re per una notte, a series hosted by Gigi Sabani in which members of the public impersonated their favourite singers.
- I cervelloni (The eggheads) – competition of amateur inventors, hosted by Paolo Bonolis, then by Giancarlo Magalli; 5 seasons.
- Bravissima – talent show with female contenders, hosted by Marco Balestri, then by Gigi Sabani; 2 seasons.

=== International ===
- (United States) The X-Files (Italia 1)
- 6 March - (United States) Renegade (Italia 1) (1992-1997)
- 14 August - (United States) Adventures of Sonic the Hedgehog (Italia 1) (1993)
- (United Kingdom) The Dreamstone (Rai 1) (1990-1995)
- (United States) X-Men (Canale 5) (1992-1997)
- (Australia) Bananas in Pyjamas (Rai 2) (1992-2001, 2011-2013)
- (United States) Biker Mice From Mars (Rai 1) (1994-1996)
- (United States) Sonic the Hedgehog (Italia 1) (1993-1994)

=== Other channels ===
- The Lion trophy show – interactive game show; 7 seasons (La 7).
- TG Rosa – parodic news program, with various host, lasted till 2001 (Odeon TV).
- Insieme – talk-show with Salvo La Rosa and others (Teleenna, then Antenna Sicilia); again on air. It's the most long-lasting Italian talk show, after Maurzio Costanzo show, and has revealed the comic duo Ficarra e Picone.

== Television shows ==
=== RAI ===
==== Drama ====
- Due madri per Rocco (Two mothers for Rocco) family drama by Andrea and Antonio Frazzi, with Eleonora Brigliadori and Pietra Montecorvino.
- Un figlio a metà un anno dopo, by Giorgio Capiani, with Gigi Proietti, sequel of Un figlio a metà.

Three chapters of the Lux Vide's Bible project were aired, all with music by Ennio Morricone:

- Genesis: The creation and the flood – by Ermanno Olmi, with Omero Antonutti as Noah.
- Jacob - by Peter Hall, with Matthew Modine.
- Joseph – by Roger Young, with Paul Mercurio and Ben Kingsley (Potifar)

===== Mystery =====
- A che punto è la notte (How deep the night is) – by Nanni Loy, a detective story in two episodes from the novel by Fruttero & Lucentini. Marcello Mastroianni resumes the role of the superintendent Santamaria, who he previously played in The Sunday woman.
- L’ombra della sera (The shadow of the evening) – by Cinzia Th Torrini, thriller with Elisabetta Cavallotti; coproduced with France.
- Moscacieca – thriller by Mario Caiano, with Aitana Sánchez-Gijón, Pamela Villoresi and Richard Roundtree.

==== Miniseries ====
- Benito – by Gianluigi Calderone, with Antonio Banderas in the title role, Claudia Koll (Rachele Mussolini) and Luca Zingaretti (Pietro Nenni); script by Vincenzo Cerami and Lidia Ravera; 3 episodes.
- Charlemagne, le prince à cheval by Clive Donner, with Christian Brendel in the title role; European coproduction in 3 episodes.
- Italian restaurant – romantic comedy by Giorgio Capitani, with Gigi Proietti as the owner of an Italian restaurant in New York, Nancy Brilli and Cristiana Capotondi; 8 episodes.
- Sì, ti voglio bene (Yes, I love you) – by Marcello Fondato, with Johnny Dorelli and Barbara De Rossi; sequel of Ma tu mi vuoi bene?, 3 episodes.

==== Variety ====
- Tunnel – satircal variety with Serena Dandini and Corrado Guzzanti (the tunnel is the one where it Italy after Tangentopoli).
- L’approfondimento in casa Gnocchi (The deepening to Gnocchi's) – satirical show; Gene Gnocchi (at his RAI debut) and his dazed family comment on the events of the week.
- Papaveri e papere (Poppies and ducks) – show about the history of the Sanremo Music Festival, by Michele Guardì, hosted by Pippo Baudo and Giancarlo Magalli; it was the final public performance of Mia Martini.
- Tutti a casa (Everybody at home) ; attempt to mix the situation comedy and talk show formulas, hosted by Pippo Baudo; the guests in the studio comment the events of four families living in the same apartment building. Very publicized, the program is one of the few failures in the Baudo's career.
- Grazie mille – with Nino Frassica.
- Massimo ascolto – with Massimo Lopez.
- Serata mondiale – mix of variety and sport program, with Alba Parietti and Valiera Marini, aired for the 1994 FIFA world cup.

==== News and educational ====
- La lunga marcia (The long march) and Processo al processo (Trial to the trial) by Enzo Biagi, in 6 episodes; reportages respectively about China and Tangentopoli.
- Nostra padrona televisione (Our master the television) – enquiry by Sergio Zavoli ; 5 episodes.
- Combat film – anthology of unpublished films realized by the cameramen of the Fifth Army in the Italian campaign, hosted by Guglielmo Zucconi; 2 seasons. The program is accused of excessive indulgence towards fascism.
- Eppur si muove (And yet it moves) – talk show about the Italian custom, ideated and hosted by Indro Montanelli and Beniamino Placido.
- Pickwick, del leggere e dello scrivere (PIckwick, about reading and writing) – magazine about books and literature, hosted by Alessandro Baricco and Giovanna Zucconi.
- L’arte di non leggere (The not-reading art) – literary magazine, with Fruttero & Lucentini.
- Serata Quark- popular science program with Piero Angela.

==== For children ====
- Le storie di Farland – by Giuliana Gamba; fantasy series with Rodolfo Baldini and a cast of puppets.
- Soccer fever – by Marco Pagot and Hitoshi Oda, Italian-Japanese cartoon about the history of the FIFA world cup, released in honour of the 1994 edition.

=== Mediaset ===
==== Drama ====
- An American love by Piero Schivazappa, with Carlo Delle Piane and Brooke Shields.
- Nero come il cuore (Black as the hearth) – mystery by Maurizio Ponzi, with Giancarlo Giannini, from the Giancarlo De Cataldo's novel.
- Fantaghirò 4 – by Lamberto Bava, with Alessandra Martines, Horst Bucholz and Brigitte Nielsen.

==== Miniseries ====
- Papà prende moglie (Dad takes a wife), by Ninì Salerno, with Marco Clumbro, Nancy Brilli and Franca Valeri; dramedy about an enlarged family, in 8 episodes.
- Passioni – telenovela in 35 episodes by Fabrizio Costa, with Gigi Proietti, Giorgio Albertazzi and Virna Lisi.

==== Variety ====
- Avanti un altro – contest among comic actors, hosted by Pippo Franco; suspended for low ratings.
- Complotto di famiglia (Family plot) – candid-camera, with Alberto Castagna.
- Talk Radio with Diggi DJ (Antonio Conticello); attempt to adapt the formula of radio dedications to television.
- Yogurt, fermenti attivi (Active ferments) – satirical show hosted by Sonia Grey; debut of Fichi d’India.

=== Other channels ===
- Notte italiana – sexy variety with Ric and Carmen Russo (Italia 7).

== Ending this year ==
- Almanacco del giorno dopo
- Amici mostri
- Appunti disordinati di viaggio
- Baby show
- Casa dolce casa
- C’eravamo tanto amati
- Canzoni spericolate
- Cartolina
- Eurogol
- Festival italianio
- Il gioco delle coppie
- Il grande gioco dell’oca
- La grande sfida
- L’ispettore Sarti
- Lui, lei, l’altro
- M’ama non m’ama
- Milano Italia
- Notte rock
- Occhio allo specchio
- Radio Londra
- Il rosso e il nero
- Sottotraccia
- Unomania

== Deaths ==
Date	Name	Age	Cinematic Credibility
7 January	Vittorio Mezzogiorno	52	Actor
28 February	Enrico Maria Salerno	67	Italian theatre & film actor
4 March	Gianni Agus	76	Italian actor
23 March	Giulietta Masina	73	Actress
18 April	Ruggero Orlando	86	Italian journalist
4 June	Massimo Troisi	41	Comic actor
28 June	Giancarlo Sbragia	68	Actor
12 July	Alberto Lionello	64	Actor and presenter
6 August	Domenico Modugno	66	Singer and actor
15 September	Moana Pozzi	33	Porn-star, then TV soubrette.
18 September	Rossano Brazzi	78	Actor
6 December	Gian Maria Volontè	61	Actor
26 December	Sylva Koscina	61	Italian actress

== See also ==
- List of Italian films of 1994
