= 1992 in Italian television =

This is a list of Italian television related events from 1992

== Events ==
=== RAI ===
In 1992, RAI too is involved in the general crisis of the political system and of the government parties.

- 1 January: the three RAI International channels (1 for America, 2 for Australia, 3 for Asia and Africa) start broadcasting.
- 19 February: the literary critic Walter Pedullà becomes RAI president.
- 26 February: during the opening evening of the Sanremo festival, hosted by Pippo Baudo, Crazy Horse (alias Mario Appignani), infamous serial jammer of public events, takes the stage crying “The festival is rigged and Fausto Leali will win it!”, before being moved away by the staff. The prediction doesn't come true: the winner is Luca Barbarossa with Portami a ballare, while Leali gets only the 9th place. The festival is the most seen show of the year, with a peak of 16,6 million viewers for the first evening.
- March 3: two weeks after the arrest of Mario Chiesa, Bettino Craxi is guest at TG3. The socialist leader, answering to a viewer’s question, calls Chiesa “a scoundrel who casts a shadow on a party that in Milan ... in fifty years never had an administrator sentenced for serious crimes.” Instead, the Mani Pulite enquiry, originated by the Chiesa affair, in the following months spreads like wildfire, overwhelming the whole Italian political system.
- March 19: the RAI general director Gianni Pasquarelli suspends, for the election time, the magazine Samarcanda, hosted by Michele Santoro, after an episode about the murder of Salvo Lima judged biased. The censorship measure is criticized by the public opinion.
- April 25: with a TV speech 45 minutes long, Francesco Cossiga announces his resignation as Republic president, two months before the end of his mandate- .
- 23 May: at 10 PM, in an interlude of the variety show Scommettiamo che..., an extraordinary edition of TG1 announces the death of Giovanni Falcone in the Capaci bombing . Despite the tragic event, RAI chooses to continue the show, against the will of the same host Fabrizio Frizzi (son-in-law of another Mafia victim, Carlo Alberto dalla Chiesa).
- 25 May: RAI airs from Palermo the burials of the victims; the tears of Rosaria Schifani, widow of a police escort, upset Italy. Paolo Borsellino declares to the TV journalist David Sassoli: "When I picked up Giovanni Falcone's last breaths in my arms, I thought it was just a postponed appointment"; On 19 July, Borsellino is in turn killed in the Via D’Amelio bombing.
- 11 July: RAI broadcasts live Puccini’s Tosca from the real places in Rome. at the same hours when the story proceeds. The show is directed by Giuseppe Patroni-Griffi, and played by Catherine Malfitano, Placido Domingo and Ruggero Raimondi.
- 26 September: Bruno Vespa, TG1 director, is impeached by his journalists for having called Christian Democracy "my publisher of reference".
- 21 December: first issue of TGR Leonardo, RAI scientific news program, care of TGR Piedmont.

=== Fininvest ===
- 13 January: on Canale 5, debut of TG5, the first Finivest news program, directed by Enrico Mentana and hosted, besides the same Mentana, by Cristina Parodi and Cesara Buonamici. The first edition is troubled by several technical problems but is gratified by a greeting message from London of the president Francesco Cossiga. Soon, the Canale 5 journal, focused on current news instead of politic and conducted by Mentana with a pressing rhythm, becomes a serious competitor for the high-flown RAI news programs.
- 17 February: the sex education program Lezioni d'amore, with Giuliano Ferrara and his wife Anselma dell'Olio, is moved to the late evening, and then cancelled, following the protests of the DC newspaper Il popolo; it is one of the latest cases of sex-related TV censorship in Italy.
- 30 July: Gianfranco Funari leaves Fininvest due to disagreements with Silvio Berlusconi, because the presenter's populis stances.
- 20 October: for the first time, Fininvest gets the TV rights for Giro d’Italia.

=== Other channels ===
- 29 March: the sporting thematic channel Tele+2 (of the TELE+ group) begins the crypted broadcastings.
- 16 May: Il Moro challenge team, sponsored by Raoul Gardini and Montedison, loses the America's Cup final against America3; it is still the best result ever achieved by an Italian boat. Telemontecarlo (also owned by Gardini) had broadcast all Il Moro di Venezia’s regattas, arousing in Italy an unprecedented interest for sailing.
- 25 July-9 August : TMC achieves another success in the field of sports information, dedicating 16 hours a day to the Barcelona Summer Olympics; critics judge his coverage of the event professionally much superior to the one offered by RAI.
- 13 August : Mammì law comes into force. The three Fininvest networks, Rete A and Videomusic gets the national concession, TMC, Retecapri, Retemia and Tele+ a provisional authorization; more than 1200 smaller TV stations surveyed in 1990 coucan continue to broadcast locally.
- 24 August: Retemia is declared bankrupt precisely when Giorgio Mendella was headed abroad. It aired a half-hour loop of a message saying "dreams can be interrupted depending on the intensity of the storm that awoke you, but unlike reality, dreams always return; we believe in that".
- 30 September: the syndication TV7 Pathè ends broadcasting because the bankrupt of the edior Giancarlo Parretti.

== Awards ==
9. Telegatto award, for the season 1991-1992.

- Show of the year: Scherzi a parte.
- Revelation of the year: Avanzi
- Man and woman of the year: Marco Columbro and Lorella Cuccarini
- Best TV movie: La storia spezzata
- Best serial: Detective Extralarge (for Italy), Miami vice (abroad).
- Best telenovela: Manuela.
- Best quiz and game show: La ruota della fortuna.
- Best variety: Scommettiamo che…?
- Best talk show: Maurizio Costanzo Show.
- Best informative program: Samarcanda.
- Best sport show: Pressing.
- Best show for children: Disney Club.
- Best spot: Artsana Control.
- Special awards: MacGyver (serial preferred by the young ones), Mi manda Lubrano (for the service TV), Madonna (best international artist), Terence Hill and Bud Spencer and Arnold Schwarzenegger (for the cinema in TV) and Ivana Serafini (reader of Sorrisi e canzoni).

== Debuts ==
=== Rai ===
==== Serials ====
- Cinico TV – by Ciprì & Maresco, series of black-and-white shorts, hosted in various other programs; 4 seasons. The series, set in the Palermo suburbia and with freakish characters, is inspired, as the future films of the two authors, by a dark and upsetting humour.

==== Variety ====
- DopoFestival – talk show commenting the Sanremo music festival; ideated by Pippo Baudo, it’s again on air.
- Unomattina Estate – morning show of the summer hosted by Amedeo Goria and many others, lasted till 2025.
- Porca miseria – game show about home economics, with Fabio Fazio; the competitors have to make ends meet with their family budget, rejecting the temptation to resort to illegal means; 2 seasons.
- Il canzoniere dell'anno – contest among the winners of the principal Italian music shows of the year; 2 seasons.

==== News and educational ====
- Milano, Italia – political talk show, broadcast from Milan and hosted initially by Gad Lerner, 2 seasons; it's now a precious document about the season of Mani Pulite and the Mafia bombings.
- Il rosso e il nero - political talk show, with Michele Santoro; 2 seasons.
- Nel regno degli animali (In the animals’ kingdom) – with Giorgio Celli, lasted (with various titles) till 2006.
- Prossimo tuo – religious magazine, with father Giovanni D’Ercole, lasted till 2002.

=== Fininvest ===
==== Serials ====
- Gommapiuma (Foam rubber) – satirical comedy with puppets, Italian version of the English Spitting Image; 3 seasons.
- (United States) Beverly Hills 90210
- Karate warrior by Fabrizio De Angelis, with Ron Williams, sequel to the 1987 movie.

==== Variety ====
- Amici – talk show with young people as guests and public, hosted by Lella Costa and, from the second edition, by the debuting Maria De Filippi; lasted till 2001, with a spin-off (Amici di sera).
- Karaoke – karaoke contest from the squares of various Italian towns, hosted by Fiorello and later by his brother Giuseppe; 3 seasons more a restart in 2015.
- Canzoni sotto l'albero (Songs under the tree) – musical Christmas show, with children as contenders, hosted by Rita Dalla Chiesa and others; 9 seasons.
- La sai l’ultima? (Do you know the latest story?) – contest of joke tellers, with various hosts (Gerry Scotti and Natalia Estrada the most active); 11 seasons and 6 spin-offs.
- Scherzi a parte (All kiddings aside) – candid camera show, with various hosts (Teo Teocoli the most active) and known personalities as the victims of the jokes; 14 seasons and 8 spin-offs or special editions.
- Bellissima – beauty pageant, with various hosts, Fininvenst’s answer to RAI’s Miss italia; 5 seasons.
- Lingo - with Tiberio Timperi, Italian version of the USA format; again on air on La 7.
- Lui, lei, l'altro – reality show, with Marco Balestri; the three members of a love triangle confront on video; lasted till 1994.
- Luna di miele - with Gabriella Carlucci, Italian version of the Dutch format Honeymoon quiz; game-show with three couples of newlyweds as contenders, 2 seasons.
- Occhio allo specchio! (Care the mirror!) – candid camera show with Paolo Bonolis; 3 seasons.
- Tutti × uno - game show with Mike Bongiorno, Italian version of Family feud; 2 seasons.
- Unomania – block programming, aimed to the young people, with various hosts ; lasted till 1994.

==== News and educational ====
- A tutto volume – books magazine, with a lively and unconventional tone, hosted by Alessandra Casella, then by Daria Bignardi; 3 seasons.
- Sgarbi quotidiani – daily column with Vittorio Sgarbi, characterized by an extreme verbal violence; lasted till 1999 on Finininvest and till 2007 on minor networks.

=== Other channels ===
- Amici mostri (Monsters friends) – show for children, with Fulvio Falzarano and Alessia Marcuzzi; 2 seasons (TMC).
- Informatica VideoMagazine – magazine about computer; 2 seasons (Telecampione).
- Roxy Bar – musical program with Red Ronnie (Videomusic ; after being transmigrated on TMC and the web, actually it is on air on San Marino RTV)

== Shows of the year ==
=== Rai ===
==== Dramas ====
- Un figlio a metà (A parted son) by Giorgio Capitani, with Gigi Proietti and Matteo Bellina; a divorced father fights to get back his son; it gets a sequel.
- Ma tu mi vuoi bene? (Do you love me?) – dramedy about international adoptions, by Marcello Fondato, with Johnny Dorelli and Monica Vitti (in her last role), it gets a sequel.
- Contro ogni volontà (Against every will) by Pino Passalcqua, with Elena Sofia Ricci and Giulio Scarpati; about rape.
- Dalla notte all'alba (From night to dawn) – by Cinzia TH Torrini, with Remo Girone, about cocaine addicition.

==== Miniseries ====
- La piovra 6 – L’ultimo segreto (The last secret) – by Luigi Perelli, with Vittorio Mezzogiorno, Patricia Millardet and Remo Girone; 6 episodes. The new hero of the franchise, Davide Licata, dies too for the consequences of a mafia attack, while the villain Tano Cariddi becomes a “pentito”.
- Il cielo non cade mai (Heaven nver falls) by Tonino Valeri with Sandrine Caron and Kim Rossi Stuart, and La moglie nella cornice (The wife in the frame), by Philippe Monnier, with Corinne Touzet and Giuliano Gemma; romances from the Maria Venturi’s novels, coproduced with France.
- Non siamo soli (We are not alone) – by Paolo Poeti, with Massimo Dapporto and Dominique Sanda; after the son’s death for overdose, a father wows his life to the rehabilitation of the drug addicted.

==== Serials ====
- Un inviato molto speciale (A very special reporter) – by Vittorio De Sisti, with Lino Banfi in the role of Damiano Tarantella, a likeable but absolutely inept TV journalist, and several TV stars playing themselves.
- Scoop by Josè Maria Sanchez, with Michele Placido as a daring reporter.
- Senator – sitcom by Gianfrancesco Lazotti set in a parodistic ancient Rome, with Pippo Franco.

==== Variety ====
- Su la testa! (Up your head!) – satirical show broadcast from the Baggio tent-theatre. The host Paolo Rossi (at his TV debut) is sided by several stand-up comedians coming from the Zelig cabaret, as Aldo, Giovanni e Giacomo.
- Partita doppia - twice-weekly show with Pippo Baudo.
- Svalutation - musical show with Adriano Celentano.
- Alta classe - care of Gianni Minà, musical variety about the history of La bussola, the most famous Italian nightclub.
- Acqua calda (Hot water) – Sunday show, with Nino Frassica and Giorgio Faletti.
- Avanspettacolo, with Franco and Ciccio; last role for Franco Franchi, who must leave the show for his bad health.
- Il canzoniere delle feste (The winter holydasys songbook) – with Loretta Goggi.
- Caro Totò, ti voglio presentare... (Dear Totò, I would introduce you...) – with Renzo Arbore, celebrative show for the 25th anniversary of Totò’s death.
- Ci siamo!?! – talent show with Gigi Sabani.
- Detto tra noi mattina – morning magazine, with Mita Medici and Luca Sardella.
- Ora di punta – broadcast simultaneously on TV and radio before the evening news program, with Mara Venier and Federico Fazzuoli.
- Telegiornale zero – satirical news program, with Piero Chiambretti.

==== News and educational ====
- Una storia (A story) - column by Enzo Biagi, aired before TG1.
- Somalia, un mondo che muore (Somalia, a dying world) – by Enzo Biagi.
- Viaggio nel Sud (Travel in Southern Italy) – by Sergio Zavoli.
- Europop - travel program about the youth culture and the pop music in the towns of the European Union, with Leonardo Pieraccioni.
- Quark Europa – by Piero Angela, divulgative program about European Union and Maastricht treaty.

=== Fininvest ===
==== Drama ====
- Fantaghirò 2 – sequel in 2 parts of Fantaghirò by Lamberto Bava, with Alessandra Martines and Kim Rossi Stuart; debut in the series of Brigitte Nielsen as the Black Witch, who will become the Fantaghirò’s recurring adversary.
- Cronaca nera – legal thriller by Faliero Rosati, with Gioia Scola.
- Errore fatale by Filippo De Luigi, with Patricia Millardet and Corinne Clery; drama about AIDS.
- Il segno del comando by Giulio Questi, with Robert Powell and Elena Sofia Ricci; remake of the 1971 miniseries, transposed from Rome to Paris.

==== Miniseries ====
- Edera – first Italian telenovela, by Fabrizio Costa, with Agnese Nano and Nicola Farron.
- Senza fine – second attempt of Italian telenovela, by Carlo Nistri, written by Ennio De Concini with Vanessa Gravina; suspended for low ratings after three episodes.
- Il coraggio di Anna – by Giorgio Capitani, with Edwige Fenech as a businnesswoman who must face several family and work troubles.
- Piazza di Spagna – by Florestano Vancini, with Lorella Cuccarini and Grażyna Szapołowska; melodramma set in Roman high society.
- Lucky Luke – directed and interpreted by Terence Hill.

==== Variety ====
- Bulli e pupe (Guys and dolls) - spin-off of Non è la RAI, with Paolo Bonolis.
- Il delitto è servito (The crime is on the table) – game show, Italian version of Cluedo, with Maurizio Micheli.
- Dido... menica – mix of cabaret and game show, with Zuzzurro e Gaspare, suspended for low ratings.
- Magico David – anthology of David Copperfield’s magic numbers, framed by comic sketches with Moana Pozzi (in her las role) and Gianni Fantoni.
- Ore 12 – Italian version of Let’s make a deal, with Gerry Scotti.
- La strana coppia (The odd couple) – cabaret with Massimo Boldi and Francesco Salvi.
- Twin clips – competition of video clips, hosted by Federica Panicucci.

==== News and educational ====
- Istinti, l’altra faccia della cronaca (Instincts, other face of chronicle) – reportage about the theme of violence by Mimmo Lombezzi and Elena Caputo, with often harsh but not gratuitous images.
- Lezioni d'amore - sex education program with Giuliano Ferrara (see over).

==== For children ====
- Cantiamo con Cristina - karaoke with Cristina D'Avena.

=== Othe channels ===
- Novantatre - game show with Umberto Samila (TMC).
- Out-officina – variety with demented humor, set in a workshop where the time machine is built; with Umberto Smaila.
- Filomena coza depurada – by Gennaro Nunziante, with Toti e Tata, parody set in Bari of the South-American telenovelas (Telebari).

== Ending this year ==
- Le altre notti
- Azzurro
- Bellezze sulla neve
- Calciomania
- Cari genitori
- Ci vediamo
- Colpo grosso
- Il commissario Corso
- Creme caramel
- Festa di compleanno
- Il gioco delle coppie
- Hot line
- Piacere Taiuno
- La più bella sei tu
- Profondo Nord
- Pronto socorso
- Samarcanda
- Telefono giallo
- Telemike
- Il Tg delle vacanze
- TG1 – Tre minuti di…
- I vicini di casa
- Una vita in gioco

== Deaths ==
- 18 March: Mario Landi (71), director.
- 29 September: Antonello Marescalchi, (62), journalist, RAI correspondent from New York.
- 9 December: Franco Franchi, (64), comic actor.
- 18 December: Franco Amurri, (67), author.
