= The D Case =

Book by Carlo Fruttero

- Author: Carlo Fruttero, Franco Lucentini
- Publication date: 1989
- ISBN: 978-0-156-23600-3

The D Case, Or The Truth About The Mystery Of Edwin Drood (original Italian title: La verità sul caso D., 'The truth about the D. case') is a humorous literary critique of Charles Dickens' unfinished work The Mystery of Edwin Drood, first published in Italy in 1989.

Written in the form of a novel, by Italian authors Carlo Fruttero and Franco Lucentini, the book explores the Dickens mystery from the perspective of many famous literary detectives, such as C. Auguste Dupin, Sherlock Holmes, and Hercule Poirot, all of whom come to their own conclusions regarding how the tale might possibly have ended. The novel presents the criticism in a postmodern style by alternating between chapters of the Fruttero and Lucentini work and the original unfinished story by Dickens. This is established under the setting of a convention that has been organized by affluent Japanese patrons to finish unfinished works of art. The chapters of The Mystery of Edwin Drood are presented in the frame of this story as being read to those in attendance of this seminar. In the alternating chapters written by Fruttero and Lucentini, the aforementioned literary detectives discuss their theories and ask questions regarding the possible clues to the story's conclusion. The conclusion that the book ultimately comes to does not offer any serious answer to the story's possible ending; however, the preceding chapters offer criticism that examines the text in a way that is both accessible and academic.
