= Fruttero & Lucentini =

Signature of Carlo Fruttero and Franco Lucentini, marked on joint work

Fruttero & Lucentini (or F. & L.) was the usual way for Carlo Fruttero and Franco Lucentini to sign their joint work, including novels, short stories, articles, anthologies. Their most successful works include the mysteries La donna della domenica, turned into a movie directed by Luigi Comencini, and A che punto è la notte.

They were also editors of the science fiction magazine Urania, and edited numerous science fiction or horror anthologies for Arnoldo Mondadori Editore until the mid-1980s.
