= Bebo's Girl =

Bebo's Girl may refer to:

- Bébo's Girl, the title of the English translation of Carlo Cassola's 1960 novel La ragazza di Bube
- La ragazza di Bube (film), the title of the American release, with English subtitles, of the Italian film adapted from the novel
