= Bebo (disambiguation) =

Bebo was an American social networking website.

Bebo may also refer to:

== People ==
- Károly Bebo (c. 1712–1779), 18th-century Hungarian sculptor, builder and decorator
- Kareena Kapoor (nicknamed Bebo; born 1980), Indian actress
- Bebo Norman (born 1973), former contemporary Christian musician
- Bebo Valdés (1918–2013), Cuban pianist, bandleader, composer and arranger

== Other ==
- Bebo, a character from the Indian television drama-series Sabki Laadli Bebo
- Bebo, a recurring character on the American sitcom Mork & Mindy
- The Bebos, a drug-smuggling gang led by Howard Mason
- Bebo (song), a song by Romeo Santos
- Bebo, a song by Burna Boy from Twice as Tall
- Bebo is a nickname given to baseball player Fernando Tatís Jr.

== See also ==
- Bebo's Girl (disambiguation)
