= The Sunday Woman (film) =

1975 film

- US film poster
- Directed by: Luigi Comencini
- Screenplay by: Age & Scarpelli
- Based on: The Sunday Woman by Fruttero & Lucentini
- Produced by: Roberto Infascelli; Marcello D'Amico
- Starring: Marcello Mastroianni; Jacqueline Bisset; Jean-Louis Trintignant; Aldo Reggiani; Pino Caruso
- Cinematography: Luciano Tovoli
- Edited by: Antonio Siciliano
- Music by: Ennio Morricone
- Production companies: Primex Italiana; Les Productions Fox Europa
- Distributed by: 20th Century Fox
- Release dates: 16 December 1975 (premiere); 23 December 1975
- Running time: 105 minutes
- Countries: Italy; France
- Language: Italian

The Sunday Woman (Italian: La donna della domenica) is a 1975 Italian crime film directed by Luigi Comencini. It is based upon the novel of the same name by Carlo Fruttero and Franco Lucentini. Set in Turin and starring Marcello Mastroianni, Jacqueline Bisset, and Jean-Louis Trintignant, the plot tells the murders of two ordinary individuals who are in touch with the city's élite.

== Plot ==
Inspector Santamaria, Chief of Homicide Squad, is assigned to investigate the murder of the architect Garrone, a second-rate fellow living on the fringes of polite society, who has been battered to death with a stone phallus. The servants of Anna Carla Dosio, the bored wife of an often away businessman, take to the police station a discarded draft of a letter she wanted to send to her dear friend Massimo Campi; in it she says that they must rid out of Garrone. The wealthy Campi has a secret lover, a young clerk called Lello Riviera who works in the city's planning department, and Santamaria has the young man followed. It emerges that Garrone was acting for the widow Ines Tabusso, who lives in a crumbling villa, along with a "simple" sister.The house is on the most renowned part of Turin, "the Hill", and if she could get the permission for building up other houses the villa's environs, she would make a fortune.

The Inspector is warned by his boss to move with care now that rich and influential people are involved. All his suspects have motives for killing Garrone and none have solid alibis for the time of his death. While Campi withholds co-operation, to protect his homosexuality, Anna Carla enthusiastically assists Santamaria and promises him a secret rendezvous, beginning with lunch. Hoping to win the co-operation of Ines, Santamaria mounts a night raid to clear her property of prostitutes.

By coincidence, a Saturday morning, all the involved characters, rally, for different reasons, at the Balon, the city's flea market, where Riviera has to meet with the possible murderer, but he's killed in turn by mean of a stone pestle. The culprit is Ines, who killed Garrone because this one had discovered by chance that in her property there was an ancient and artistic stone used as a laundry, set under the provisions of Art Superintendence, so the Tabusso's ground was forbidden to sell; Garrone had made her believe that by corrupting, the interdiction would have been removed. With the case solved, Santamaria and Anna Carla are able to enjoy the private lunch they have promised each other. Their happy afternoon ends when she has to get out of bed to start packing for the family holidays.

== Cast ==
- Marcello Mastroianni as Commissioner Salvatore Santamaria
- Jacqueline Bisset as Anna Carla Dosio
- Jean-Louis Trintignant as Massimo Campi
- Aldo Reggiani as Lello Riviera
- Maria Teresa Albani as Virginia Tabusso
- Omero Antonutti as Benito
- Gigi Ballista as Vollero
- Fortunato Cecilia as Nicosia (as Renato Cecilia)
- Claudio Gora as Garrone
- Franco Nebbia as Bonetto
- Lina Volonghi as Ines Tabusso
- Pino Caruso as De Palma
- Mario Ferrero as Vittorio Dosio
- Giuseppe Anatrelli as Commissario
- Antonio Orlando as Salvatore
