= T. P. James =

American publisher

Thomas Power James (better known as T. P. James) was a publisher in Brattleboro, Vermont best known for publishing a completion of Charles Dickens' The Mystery of Edwin Drood claimed to be written by the spirit of Dickens channeled through automatic writing, a form of spiritualism.

The book, published in 1873 under the title Part Second of the Mystery of Edwin Drood, was reviewed by the New York Times, as well as regional newspapers, like the Salem Observer. With a successful marketing campaign, the book became an item of comment in the literary community, with an essay by Arthur Conan Doyle in The Bookman negatively comparing the continuation of the novel with the original work. Subsequent scholarship has later debated the authenticity and similarity of the work to the original Dickens.

A writing contest was hosted for several years in the town of Brattleboro to commemorate the hoax publisher, and will be re-launched in October of 2022.
