= Carlo Cassola =

Italian novelist and essayist (1917–1987)

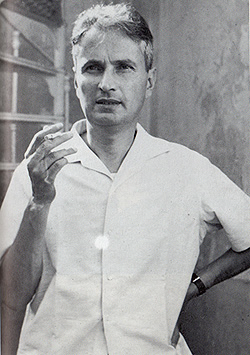
- Born: 17 March 1917; Rome, Italy
- Died: 29 January 1987 (aged 69); Montecarlo, Tuscany, Italy

Carlo Cassola (17 March 1917 – 29 January 1987) was an Italian novelist and essayist. His novel La Ragazza di Bube (1960), which received the Strega Prize, was adapted into a film of the same name by Luigi Comencini in 1963.

== Bibliography ==
From the collection of the Library of Congress, Washington, DC:

- L'amore tanto per fare (1981)
- Gli anni passano (1982)
- L'antagonista (1976)
- An arid heart Translated by William Weaver. (1964)
- Bebo's girl Translated by Marguerite Waldman. (1962)
- Carlo Cassola: letteratura e disarmo: intervista e testi (1978)
- Il cacciatore (1964)
- La casa di via Valadier (1968)
- Cassola racconta (1981)
- Colloquio con le ombre (1982)
- Contro le armi (1980)
- Conversazione su una cultura compromessa (1977)
- Un cuore arido (1961)
- La disavventura (1977)
- Fausto and Anna Translated by Isabel Quigly. (1960) ISBN 0-8371-8074-0
- Ferragosto di morte: romanzo (1980)
- Ferrovia locale (1968)
- Fogli di diario (1974)
- Il gigante cieco (1976)
- Gisella (1974)
- Gisella Second edition. (1978)
- Le lezione della storia (1978)
- Mio padre (1983)
- Il mondo senza nessuno: romanzo (1982)
- Monte Mario (1973) (Portrait of Helena, 1975 ISBN 0-7011-2049-5 )
- La morale del branco (1980)
- Il paradiso degli animali (1979)
- Paura e tristezza (1970) (1984 edition ISBN 88-17-66191-0 )
- La ragazza di Bube (1960) 14th edition (1995) ISBN 88-17-11350-6
- Il ribelle (1980)
- La rivoluzione disarmista (1983)
- Il romanzo moderno (1981)
- Il soldato (1965)
- Storia di Ada (1967)
- Il superstite (1978)
- Il taglio del bosco (1955)
- Il taglio del bosco: racconti lunghi e romanzi brevi (1975)
- Il taglio del bosco: Rosa Gagliardi; Le amiche (1995)
- Il taglio del bosco, venticinque racconti (1955)
- Tempi memorabili (1981)
- Troppo tardi (1975)
- Ultima frontiera (1976)
- L’uomo e il cane (1975)
- Un uomo solo (1978)
- I vecchi compagni: un matrimonio del dopoguera (1978)
- Vita d’artista (1980)
- La zampa d’oca (1981)
- Poesia e romanzo with Mario Luzi. (1973)
- Carlo Cassola Selections by Rodolfo Macchioni Jodi. (1976, 1982)
- La forza della parola : incontri con Cassola.... Interview by Franco Zangrilli. (1992)

== Bibliography ==
- "Carlo Cassola, Author Of Novels and Stories". New York Times. 30 January 1987. p. B8.
