= La ragazza di Bube (film) =

1963 film by Luigi Comencini

- Original film poster
- Directed by: Luigi Comencini
- Screenplay by: Luigi Comencini
- Based on: La ragazza di Bube by Carlo Cassola
- Produced by: Franco Cristaldi
- Starring: Claudia Cardinale, George Chakiris
- Cinematography: Gianni Di Venanzo
- Edited by: Nino Baragli
- Music by: Carlo Rustichelli
- Distributed by: Continental Motion Pictures Corporation
- Release date: 1963
- Running time: 106 minutes
- Country: Italy
- Language: Italian

La ragazza di Bube is a 1963 Italian crime film drama directed by Luigi Comencini and starring Claudia Cardinale and George Chakiris.

In terms of plot the film is a relatively faithful adaptation of Carlo Cassola’s 1960 novel La ragazza di Bube; but its atmosphere is distinctly different, as the protagonists Mara and Bube, adolescents in the book, are interpreted here as young adults.

The film was nominated for a Golden Bear Award at the 14th Berlin International Film Festival and won the best production at the David di Donatello Awards. Claudia Cardinale was awarded the Nastro d'Argento for Best Actress (Migliore Attrice Protagonista) by the Italian National Syndicate of Film Journalists for her performance in the role of as Mara.

The film was released in the United States in 1964 with the title Bebo's Girl.

== Plot ==
In the Tuscan countryside after World War II, peasant girl Mara (age 16) falls in love in return with partisan Bebo (age 19). Involved in a double murder, Bebo is forced, however, into hiding and fleeing Italy. The girl, determined to wait for her beloved, moves to the city where she meets Stefano: with him a complicity is born that is able to make her regain her smile while never forgetting Bebo, of whom she has no news for many months.

Stefano's feeling for Mara is sincere and she is now on the verge of reciprocating it when her father informs her that Bebo has been arrested at the border, inviting her to visit him in jail. For him, disillusioned and tried by his absconding and impending conviction, Mara still feels a love capable of giving her the courage to stay by his side until the end. Sentenced to 14 years in prison, she will wait for him, renouncing in spite of herself a future with Stefano from whom she bids farewell in the last dramatic sequence of the film.

== Cast ==
- Claudia Cardinale as Mara
- George Chakiris as Bube
- Marc Michel as Stefano
- Dany París as Liliana
- Monique Vita as Ines
- Carla Calò as Mara's Mother
- Emilio Esposito as Mara's Father

=== Uncredited cast ===
- Pierluigi Catocci as Priest
- Ugo Chiti as Arnaldo
- Dario Dolci
- Anna Maria Festa
- Gabriella Giorgelli
- Mario Lupi as Lidori
- Luciano Maringola
- Bruno Scipioni as Mauro

== Reception ==
In a contemporary review, Hawk. of Variety gave the film a positive review, praising Cardinale specifically in the role, declaring "it should win her solid recognition everywhere." The review also praised Gianni di Venanzo's photography noting that his "chiaroscuro work on settings, as well as his fine closeups of Miss Cardinale especially, are of the highest standard."
