= A che punto è la notte =

1979 novel by Carlo Fruttero and Franco Lucentini

First edition (publ. Mondadori)

A che punto è la notte is a mystery novel written by Italian authors Carlo Fruttero and Franco Lucentini in 1979.

It was published by Arnoldo Mondadori Editore, and features the same commissar Santamaria who had been protagonist of the duo's first successful mystery, La donna della domenica. It deals with the assassination of an unusual priest of the Church of Santa Liberata in Turin.

The novel was turned into a TV miniseries directed by Nanni Loy in 1994.
