= Lina Volonghi =

Italian actress (1914–1991)

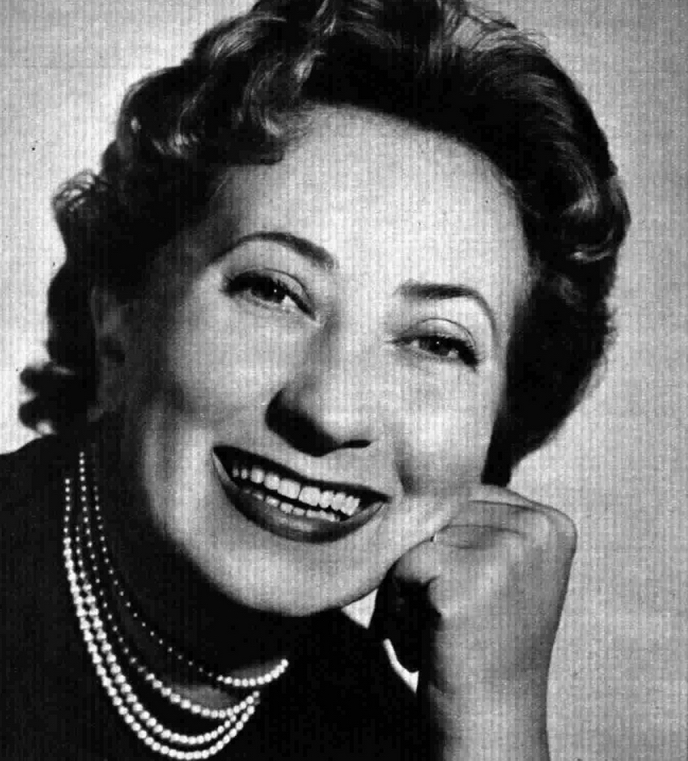
- Born: Giuseppina Angela Volonghi; 4 September 1914; Genoa, Italy
- Died: 24 February 1991 (aged 76); Milan, Italy
- Occupation: Actress

Lina Volonghi (4 September 1914 – 24 February 1991) was an Italian stage, television and film actress.

== Life and career ==
Born in Genoa as Giuseppina Angela Volonghi, a promising junior swimming champion in her youth, Volonghi started her acting career in 1933, when she debuted in the comedy play I manezzi pe' majâ na figgia, in the Gilberto Govi's stage company. After six years she left the Govi's company and moved to Rome, where she joined the Anton Giulio Bragaglia's company Theatre of the Arts. In these years she gained critical appreciation for her versatility in comic and dramatic roles. She later worked on stage with Luchino Visconti, Giorgio Strehler, Luigi Squarzina among others. Also active in films, TV, and radio dramas and series, she retired in 1986 following a sudden heart attack. Volonghi was married to actor Carlo Cataneo.

== Filmography ==
Year	Title	Role	Notes
1943	La signora in nero	Marta, la governante	
1946	Paese senza pace	Madonna Libera	
1949	Hand of Death	Carmela Caputo	
1951	Ha fatto 13		
1955	The Belle of Rome	Tina	
1955	Io piaccio	Lucia	
1961	A Difficult Life	Amelia Pavinato	
1964	Le tardone	Isabella	(episode "L'armadio")
1965	Rita the American Girl	Greta Wagner	
1974	The Balloon Vendor	Sister Maria	
1975	The Sunday Woman	Ines Tabusso	
1977	Cara sposa	Rosa Balestra	
1981	Nessuno è perfetto	Mother-in-law of Guerrino	
1984	La Septième Cible	La mamma	
