= The Belle of Rome =

1955 film by Luigi Comencini

- Directed by: Luigi Comencini
- Written by: Luigi Comencini; Ettore Maria Margadonna; Edoardo Anton
- Cinematography: Arturo Gallea
- Edited by: Nino Baragli
- Music by: Nino Rota; Franco Ferrara
- Release date: 1955
- Running time: 99 minutes
- Country: Italy
- Language: Italian

The Belle of Rome (Italian: La bella di Roma) is a 1955 Italian comedy film directed by Luigi Comencini.

== Plot summary ==
The film shows how Nannina, left alone after her fiancé is jailed, works in a bar where two men pursue her, but she ultimately finds her own direction and builds a stable future.

== Cast ==
- Silvana Pampanini: Nannina
- Alberto Sordi: Gracco
- Paolo Stoppa: Oreste
- Antonio Cifariello: Mario
- Luisella Beghi: Ines
- Sergio Tofano: Agostino
- Giulio Calì: railway-man
- Lina Volonghi: Tina
- Ciccio Barbi: the priest
- Bice Valori: Sister Serafina
- Gigi Reder: Luigi
