= Bébo's Girl =

1960 novel by Carlo Cassola

- First edition cover
- Author: Carlo Cassola
- Original title: La ragazza di Bube
- Translator: Marguerite Waldman
- Language: Italian
- Genre: Historical fiction
- Publisher: Einaudi
- Publication date: 3 August 1960
- Publication place: Italy
- English publication date: 1 January 1962
- Pages: 242
- ISBN: 9788817113502

Bebo's Girl (Italian: La ragazza di Bube) is a historical fiction novel by Italian writer Carlo Cassola which was published in 1960 and was awarded that year’s Premio Strega. Its initial reception was enthusiastic and an English translation by Marguerite Waldman was published in 1962 as Bebo’s Girl. By 1995 the original had been through in 14 editions.

== Plot summary ==
Mara, a young woman from Monteguidi, a small town in the Val d'Elsa, who, in the aftermath of the Liberation, meets the partisan Bube, hero of the Resistance, and falls in love with him.

== Film adaptation ==
In 1963 the book was made into a film, also called La ragazza di Bube, directed by Luigi Comencini and starring Claudia Cardinale as Mara.
