= Franco Lucentini =

Italian writer

- Born: 24 December 1920; Rome, Italy
- Died: 5 August 2002 (aged 81); Turin, Italy
- Occupations: novelist, journalist, translator, editor
- Writing career
- Pen name: F&L (together with Carlo Fruttero), Sydney Ward, P. Kettridge
- Language: Italian
- Period: 1951–2002
- Genre: crime novel
- Literary movement: Neoavanguardia

Franco Lucentini (Italian pronunciation: [ˈfraŋko lutʃenˈtiːni]; 24 December 1920 – 5 August 2002) was an Italian writer, journalist, translator and editor of anthologies.

== Biography ==
Born in Rome on 24 December 1920 to Emma Marzi and Venanzio Lucentini, a miller from the village of Visso, in the Marche region, and later the owner of a bakery in Rome.

While studying Philosophy at the University of Rome, Lucentini was one of the organizers of a practical joke against the fascist regime: on 5 May 1941, he and a friend distributed among other students paper streamers. When unrolled during a public meeting, they revealed writings such as "Down with the war!", "Down with Hitler!" and "Long live freedom!". Lucentini was arrested and spent two months in prison.

Lucentini graduated in February 1943. Drafted into military service later that year, he was refused admission to officer candidate school on account of his anti-fascist activities. After the Armistice, the Allied armed forces put his writing skills to use, hiring him as a junior editor for the "United Nations News" press agency in Naples.

After the war, Lucentini worked in Rome for ANSA news agency; later, while associated with ONA news agency, he spent time in Prague and Vienna. The atmosphere of postwar Vienna provided the inspiration for his novella I compagni sconosciuti. After a brief time again in Rome, in 1949 he left for Paris where he was employed in several jobs (deliveryman, teacher, masseur).

While in Paris, he first met the two most important people in his life: Simone Benne Darses, 12 years older than he was, who would become his lifetime partner and, in 1952, Carlo Fruttero, with whom a lifelong literary collaboration began in 1957, when Lucentini moved to Turin, where both of them worked for the Einaudi publishing house. Lucentini frequently travelled to Paris on scouting assignments for Einaudi looking for new authors and titles to bring to Italy. He introduced Italian readers to the works of Jorge Luis Borges, whose works he also translated from Spanish into Italian. Lucentini also translated several foreign books for Einaudi from many different languages including Chinese and Japanese.

As a highly successful and appreciated literary team, Fruttero & Lucentini wrote books and worked in publishing, directing book series and magazines (Il Mago, Urania), and editing fiction anthologies, for the Einaudi publishing house and, from 1961, for Mondadori. In 1972 Lucentini and Fruttero began writing for the Turin-based daily La Stampa (then directed by Alberto Ronchey), writing the column "L'Agenda di F. & L.", commenting with humour and irony on current facts; they also wrote for L'Espresso and Epoca.

The duo's first book was the poetry collection L'idraulico non verrà, in 1971. But their breakthrough work was the critically acclaimed crime novel La donna della domenica (1972), set in Turin. The novel was eventually made into a film of the same title, starring Marcello Mastroianni, Jacqueline Bisset and Jean-Louis Trintignant and directed by Luigi Comencini. Their next novel, A che punto è la notte (1979), shared the same protagonist, the Commissioner Santamaria. In the following decades, Lucentini and Fruttero co-authored several more novels and non-fiction books, and "F&L" became a known and appreciated quasi-trademark.

In 2000 Lucentini was awarded a special Campiello award for his life's work.

Afflicted by a lung cancer, Lucentini committed suicide on 5 August 2002, throwing himself down the stairs of his flat's building in piazza Vittorio Veneto, 1, in Turin. His friend and co-author Carlo Fruttero observed: "He had no pills, it was difficult to get into the river, and he would have been rescued anyway, the train was too far. Before dying he would have thought, what's all the buzz about death?, let's get it over with".

== Pseudonyms ==
Lucentini sometimes used the pseudonyms Sydney Ward and P. Kettridge; he used the first one mostly to byline short stories of his own in anthologies of science-fiction or war stories by foreign authors.

== Bibliography ==
=== Alone ===
- La porta - Short story, written in 1947 and first published in the first issue (March/April 1953) of the literary magazine "Nuovi Argomenti" (lit., "The door")
- I compagni sconosciuti, Einaudi, 1951 (republished in 2006) - The gloomy tale of Franco, an Italian wandering in post-war Vienna (lit., "The unknown mates")
- Notizie degli scavi, Feltrinelli, 1964 (republished by Einaudi in 2001) - A novella about "Professor", the feeble-minded factotum of a brothel in Rome (lit., "News of the excavations")

=== With Carlo Fruttero ===
- Il secondo libro della fantascienza, Einaudi, 1961 - The first of several successful anthologies of science fiction short stories edited by F&L.
- L'idraulico non verrà, Mario Spagnol, 1971 (republished by Nuovo Melangolo in 1993) - Poetry collection (literally, "The plumber will not come").
- La donna della domenica, Mondadori, 1972 (translated into English by William Weaver as The Sunday Woman in 1973) - The first and most famous novel by F&L, and one of the first examples of Italian crime novels; winner of the "Il Libro dell'Anno" award.
- L'Italia sotto il tallone di F&L, Mondadori, 1974 - A humorous political fantasy in which Fruttero & Lucentini become dictators of Italy with the help of Muammar al-Gaddafi; the novel was inspired by the real, very harsh reaction of the embassy of Libya to a satirical article by F&L in La Stampa, very critical of Gaddafi; winner of the "Premio della Satira Political" award for political satire (lit., "Italy under F[ruttero] & L[ucentini]'s heel").
- Il significato dell'esistenza, 1975 (republished by Tea in 1997) - Novel (lit., "The meaning of existence").
- A che punto è la notte, Mondadori, 1979 - Crime novel (lit., "What of the night", as in the Bible book of Isaiah, 22:11).
- La cosa in sé, Einaudi, 1982 - Play "in two acts and a licence" about a man who realises that solipsism is real and all the universe is created by his mind (lit., "The thing in itself", as in the philosophical term).
- Il Palio delle contrade morte, Mondadori, 1983 - Novel (lit., "The Palio of the dead quarters").
- Ti trovo un po' pallida, 1983 - A ghost story set in sunny Tuscany, originally appeared in the L'Espresso magazine in 1979; it was actually written by Fruttero alone, as explained in the afterword to 2007 volume edition (lit., "You look quite pale").
- La prevalenza del cretino, Mondadori, 1985 - A collection of "L'Agenda di F. & L." columns from the newspaper La Stampa, about all forms of stupidity (lit., "The supremacy of the stupid").
- Il colore del destino, Mondadori, 1987 - Collects three novellas: Notizie dagli scavi (by Lucentini) and Ti trovo un po' pallida (by Fruttero), already published, and Il colore del destino (written jointly); it is the only book by the two authors having the byline "Lucentini & Fruttero" rather than "Fruttero & Lucentini" (lit., "The colour of destiny").
- La verità sul caso D, Einaudi, 1989 (translated into English by Gregory Dowling as The D. Case: Or The Truth About The Mystery Of Edwin Drood) - A completion and elaboration on Dickens's The Mystery of Edwin Drood (lit., "The truth on the D case").
- L'amante senza fissa dimora, Mondadori, 1990 - A successful Italian woman meets a mysterious man in romantic Venice: an apparently standard love story with a twist (lit., "The lover of no fixed abode").
- Storie americane di guerra, Einaudi, 1991 - Anthology of "American war stories".
- Enigma in luogo di mare, Mondadori, 1991 - Crime novel set in a seaside community in Tuscany (lit., "Riddle in a sea town").
- Il ritorno del cretino, Mondadori, 1992 - More columns from "La Stampa" (lit., "The comeback of the stupid").
- Breve storia delle vacanze, Mondadori, 1994 - (lit., "Short history of vacations").
- La morte di Cicerone, Nuovo Melangolo, 1995 - (lit., "Cicero's death").
- Il nuovo libro dei nomi di battesimo, Mondadori, 1998 - A non-fiction handbook about how to choose a name for a son, with amusing information and trivia on names' meaning and use.
- Il cretino in sintesi, Mondadori, 2002 - Still more columns from "La Stampa" (lit., "The stupid in synthesis").
- Viaggio di nozze al Louvre, Allemandi, 2002 - (lit., "Honeymoon at Louvre").
- I nottambuli, Avagliano, 2002 - (lit., "The nightwalkers").
- I ferri del mestiere, Einaudi, 2003 - A collection of articles and short stories edited by Domenico Scarpa (lit., "The tools of the trade").
