= The Mystery of Edwin Drood =

1870 novel by Charles Dickens

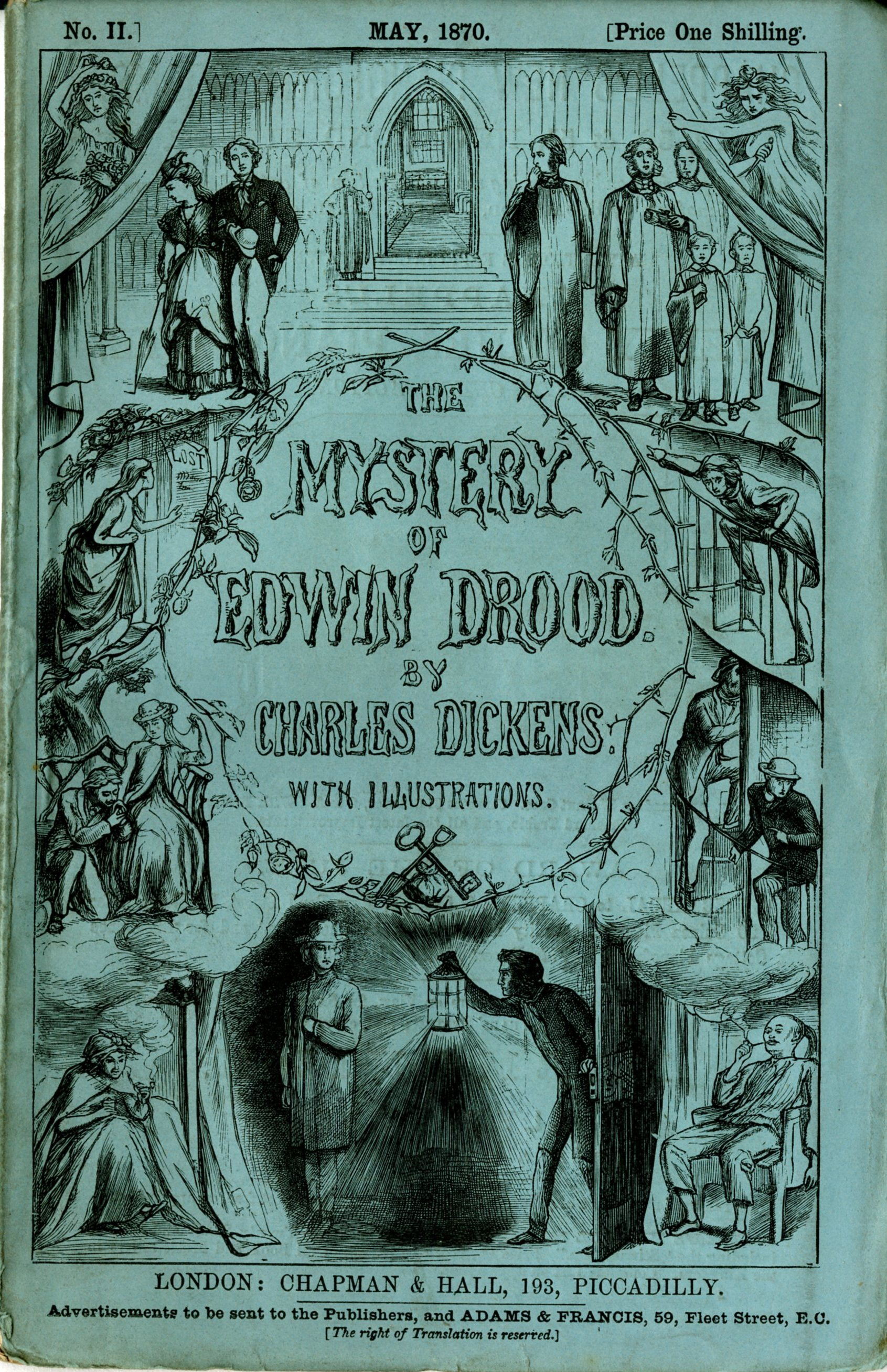
- Cover of serial No. 2, May 1870
- Author: Charles Dickens
- Illustrator: Samuel Luke Fildes
- Cover artist: Charles Allston Collins
- Language: English
- Genre: Novel (murder mystery)
- Published: Serialized and book form 1870
- Publisher: Chapman & Hall; London
- Publication place: England
- Media type: Print
- Preceded by: Our Mutual Friend
- Text: The Mystery of Edwin Drood at Wikisource

The Mystery of Edwin Drood is a novel by English author Charles Dickens, originally published in 1870. It was his final novel and was left unfinished when he died.

Though the novel is named after the character Edwin Drood, it focuses more on Drood's uncle, John Jasper, a precentor, choirmaster and opium addict, who lusts after his pupil, Rosa Bud. Miss Bud, Edwin Drood's fiancée, has also caught the eye of the high-spirited and hot-tempered Neville Landless. Landless and Edwin Drood take an instant dislike to each other. Later Drood disappears under mysterious circumstances. The story is set in Cloisterham, a lightly disguised Rochester.

At the death of Dickens on 9 June 1870, the novel was left unfinished in his writing desk, only six of a planned twelve instalments having been written. He left no detailed plan for the remaining installments or solution to the novel's mystery, and many later adaptations and continuations by other writers have attempted to complete the story.

== Summary ==
The novel begins as John Jasper leaves a London opium den. He is the choirmaster at Cloisterham Cathedral. The next evening, he is visited by his nephew, Edwin Drood. Edwin confides that he has misgivings about his betrothal to Rosa Bud, which had been arranged by their fathers. The next day, Edwin visits Rosa at the Nuns' House, the boarding school where she lives. They quarrel good-naturedly, which they apparently do frequently during his visits. Meanwhile, Jasper, having an interest in the cathedral crypt, seeks the company of Durdles, a man who knows more about the crypt than anyone else.

Neville Landless and his twin sister Helena are sent to Cloisterham for their education. Neville will study with the minor canon the Rev. Septimus Crisparkle; Helena will live at the Nuns' House with Rosa. Neville confides to Mr Crisparkle that he had hated his cruel stepfather, while Rosa confides to Helena that she loathes and fears Jasper, who is her music master. Neville is immediately smitten with Rosa and is indignant that Edwin treats his betrothal so lightly. Edwin provokes him and he reacts violently, which gives Jasper the opportunity to spread rumours that Neville has a violent temper. Mr Crisparkle tries to reconcile Edwin and Neville; Neville agrees to apologise to Edwin if Edwin will forgive him. It is arranged that they will dine together for this purpose on Christmas Eve at Jasper's home.

Rosa's guardian, Mr Grewgious, tells her that she has a substantial inheritance from her father. When she asks whether there would be any forfeiture if she did not marry Edwin, he replies that there would be none on either side. Back at his office in London, Mr Grewgious gives Edwin a ring which Rosa's father had given to her mother, with the proviso that Edwin must either give the ring to Rosa as a sign of his irrevocable commitment to her or return it to Mr Grewgious. Mr Bazzard, Mr Grewgious's clerk, witnesses this transaction.

Next day, Rosa and Edwin amicably agree to end their betrothal. They decide to ask Mr Grewgious to break the news to Jasper, and Edwin intends to return the ring to Mr Grewgious. Meanwhile, Durdles takes Jasper into the cathedral crypt. On the way there Durdles points out a mound of quicklime. Jasper provides Durdles with a bottle of wine. The wine is mysteriously potent and Durdles loses consciousness; while unconscious he dreams that Jasper goes off by himself in the crypt. As Jasper and Durdles return from the crypt, they encounter a boy called Deputy; Jasper, thinking he was spying on them, takes him by the throat but, realising that this will strangle him, lets him go.

On Christmas Eve, Neville buys himself a heavy walking stick; he plans to spend his Christmas break hiking in the countryside. Meanwhile, Edwin visits a jeweller to get his pocket watch repaired; it is mentioned that the only jewellery he wears is the watch and chain and a shirt pin. By chance he meets a woman who is an opium user from London. She asks Drood's Christian name and he replies that it is "Edwin"; she says he is fortunate it is not "Ned", for "Ned" is in great danger. He thinks nothing of this, for the only person who calls him "Ned" is Jasper. Meanwhile, Jasper buys himself a black scarf of strong silk, which is not seen again during the course of the novel. The reconciliation dinner is successful and at midnight Edwin Drood and Neville Landless leave together to go down to the river and look at a storm that rages that night.

The next morning Edwin is missing and Jasper encourages suspicions that Neville has killed him. Neville leaves early in the morning for his hike; the townspeople overtake him and forcibly bring him back to the city. Mr Crisparkle keeps Neville out of jail by taking responsibility for him, stating that he will produce Neville any time his presence is required. That night, Jasper is strongly affected when Mr Grewgious informs him that Edwin and Rosa have ended their betrothal; he reacts more strongly to this news than to the possibility that Edwin may be dead. The next morning, Mr Crisparkle goes to the river weir and finds Edwin's watch and chain and shirt pin.

Half a year later, Neville is living in London near Mr Grewgious's office. Lieutenant Tartar introduces himself and offers to share his garden with Neville; Lt Tartar's chambers are adjacent to Neville's above a common courtyard.

A white-haired and whiskered stranger calling himself Dick Datchery arrives in Cloisterham. He rents a room below Jasper's and observes the comings and goings in the area. Going to his lodgings for the first time, Mr Datchery asks Deputy for directions. Deputy will not go near the lodgings for fear that Jasper will choke him again.

Jasper visits Rosa at the Nuns' House and professes his love for her. She rejects him but he persists, telling her that if she gives him no hope he will destroy Neville, the brother of her dear friend Helena. In fear of Jasper, Rosa flees to Mr Grewgious in London.

The next day Mr Crisparkle follows Rosa to London. While he is with her and Mr Grewgious, Lt Tartar calls and asks if he remembers him. Mr Crisparkle does remember him, as the person who years before saved him from drowning. They do not dare let Rosa contact Neville and Helena directly, for fear that Jasper may be watching Neville, but Lt Tartar allows Rosa to visit his chambers to contact Helena above the courtyard. Mr Grewgious arranges for Rosa to rent a place from Mrs Billickin and for Miss Twinkleton to live with her there for respectability.

Jasper visits the London opium den again for the first time since Edwin's disappearance. When he leaves, at dawn, the woman who runs the opium den follows him. She vows to herself that she will not lose his trail again, as she had done after his last visit. This time, she follows him all the way to his home in Cloisterham; outside it she meets Datchery, who tells her Jasper's name and that he will sing in the cathedral service the next morning. On inquiry, Datchery learns she is called "Princess Puffer". The next morning she attends the service and shakes her fists at Jasper from behind a pillar, observed by both Datchery and Deputy.

Dickens's death leaves the rest of the story unknown. According to his friend and biographer John Forster, after writing him two brief letters which relate to the plot (but not the murder) Dickens had supplied Forster with an outline of the full plot:

His first fancy for the tale was expressed in a letter in the middle of July. "What should you think of the idea of a story beginning in this way?—Two people, boy and girl, or very young, going apart from one another, pledged to be married after many years—at the end of the book. The interest to arise out of the tracing of their separate ways, and the impossibility of telling what will be done with that impending fate." This was laid aside; but it left a marked trace on the story as afterwards designed, in the position of Edwin Drood and his betrothed. I first heard of the later design in a letter dated "Friday the 6th of August 1869", in which after speaking, with the usual unstinted praise he bestowed always on what moved him in others, of a little tale he had received for his journal, he spoke of the change that had occurred to him for the new tale by himself. "I laid aside the fancy I told you of, and have a very curious and new idea for my new story. Not a communicable idea (or the interest of the book would be gone), but a very strong one, though difficult to work." The story, I learnt immediately afterward, was to be that of the murder of a nephew by his uncle; the originality of which was to consist in the review of the murderer's career by himself at the close, when its temptations were to be dwelt upon as if, not he the culprit, but some other man, were the tempted. The last chapters were to be written in the condemned cell, to which his wickedness, all elaborately elicited from him as if told of another, had brought him. Discovery by the murderer of the utter needlessness of the murder for its object, was to follow hard upon commission of the deed; but all discovery of the murderer was to be baffled till towards the close, when, by means of a gold ring which had resisted the corrosive effects of the lime into which he had thrown the body, not only the person murdered was to be identified but the locality of the crime and the man who committed it. So much was told to me before any of the book was written; and it will be recollected that the ring, taken by Drood to be given to his betrothed only if their engagement went on, was brought away with him from their last interview. Rosa was to marry Tartar, and Crisparkle the sister of Landless, who was himself, I think, to have perished in assisting Tartar finally to unmask and seize the murderer.

== Characters ==
- Edwin Drood: an orphan. When he comes of age, he plans to marry Rosa Bud and go to Egypt, working as an engineer with the firm in which his father had been a partner.
- Rosa Bud: an orphan and Edwin Drood's fiancée. Their betrothal was arranged by their fathers.
- John Jasper: the choirmaster of Cloisterham Cathedral, Edwin Drood's uncle and guardian, and Rosa Bud's music master. Not much older than Drood, he secretly loves Rosa. He frequently visits an opium den in London, run by Princess Puffer. It is probable (see evidence below) that Dickens intended to make him the putative murderer. Jasper seemingly takes advantage of the well-known and acrimonious rivalry between Drood and Neville Landless for Rosa's affections, apparently murdering Drood soon after Landless's resentful and angry remarks about Drood, thus shifting public suspicion of Drood's murder away from himself and onto Landless. A further implication is that if Landless were to be convicted of Drood's murder and executed, Jasper would have disposed of both of Rosa's love interests, and would be free to try for Rosa's hand himself.
- Neville Landless: one of a set of orphaned twins; his sister is Helena. They are from Ceylon, but it is not clear to what extent they are Ceylonese. In their childhood they were mistreated and deprived. The immature and impressionable Neville is immediately smitten with Rosa Bud, and becomes Drood's hated rival for her affections; he has a volatile temper (which Jasper exacerbates by drugging his wine) and is more proud than is good for him. His temper and pride cause him to become the prime suspect in Drood's disappearance; the obvious suspicion is that he had become enraged and killed Drood in the hope of being able to win Rosa himself. His integrity prevents him from making an insincere apology to Drood.
- Helena Landless: Neville's twin sister. Helena and Rosa become dear friends. According to Neville, she successfully pretended to be a boy during their escape attempts in childhood.
- The Rev. Septimus Crisparkle: minor canon of Cloisterham Cathedral and Neville Landless's mentor.
- Mrs Crisparkle: Mr Crisparkle's widowed mother.
- Mr (Hiram) Grewgious: a London lawyer and Rosa Bud's guardian. He was a friend of her parents. He also was an unsuccessful suitor of Rosa Bud's mother, who in her youth looked extremely similar to Rosa Bud.
- Mr Bazzard: Mr Grewgious's clerk. He is absent from that post when Datchery is in Cloisterham. He has written a play.
- (Stony) Durdles: a stonemason and the local undertaker. He knows more than anyone else about the Cloisterham Cathedral cemetery; he takes Jasper on a tour of the graveyard and tells him about the human-flesh-dissolving properties of quicklime.
- Deputy: a small boy. "Deputy" is a nickname he uses to conceal his own name. If he catches Durdles out after 10 pm and drunk, he throws stones at him until he goes home. Durdles pays Deputy a halfpenny per night to do so.
- Dick Datchery: an enigmatic stranger who takes lodgings in Cloisterham for a month or two. He becomes interested in Jasper and in Princess Puffer; the implication is that he is an undercover detective summoned to help solve Drood's murder, or another character in disguise.
- Her Royal Highness the Princess Puffer: a haggard woman who runs a London opium den frequented by Jasper. She is unnamed in most of the book, and "Princess Puffer" is the title which Deputy gives her. She habitually claims to be helpless and ill to gain sympathy and handouts, but she secretly shows considerable savvy and cunning, both in swindling the customers of her opium den and in gleaning revealing information about them.
- Mr (Thomas) Sapsea: a comically conceited auctioneer. By the time of Drood's disappearance he has become Mayor of Cloisterham.
- The Dean: the Dean is the most senior clergyman at Cloisterham Cathedral, a man of some gravitas to whom others behave with fitting deference. In return he can be rather condescending.
- Mr Tope: the verger of Cloisterham Cathedral.
- Mrs Tope: the verger's wife. She cooks for Jasper and lets lodgings to Datchery.
- Miss Twinkleton: the mistress of the Nuns' House, the boarding school where Rosa lives.
- Mrs Tisher: Miss Twinkleton's assistant at the Nuns' House.
- Mr (Luke) Honeythunder: a bombastic London philanthropist. He is Neville and Helena Landless's guardian.
- Mr Tartar: a retired naval officer. He resigned his commission in his late twenties when an uncle left him some property, but he lives in London, being unaccustomed to the space of a large estate.
- Mrs Billickin: a widowed distant cousin of Mr Bazzard. She lets lodgings in London to Rosa and Miss Twinkleton.

== Hints and suspicions ==
=== The murderer ===
Edwin Drood's fate is not clear. His killer, if any, is not revealed but is generally believed to be John Jasper, his uncle, for three reasons:

1. John Forster had the plot described to him by Dickens: "The story ... was to be that of the murder of a nephew by his uncle."
2. Luke Fildes, who illustrated the story, said that Dickens had told him, when they were discussing an illustration, "I must have the double necktie! It is necessary, for Jasper strangles Edwin Drood with it."
3. Dickens's son Charles stated that his father had told him unequivocally that Jasper was the murderer.

The book gives other hints:

1. It describes a night scene in which Jasper goes secretly with Durdles to the graveyard. Jasper sees quicklime, at that time believed to hasten the decomposition of bodies.
2. A day before he disappears, Edwin talks with Princess Puffer in the graveyard. She tells him "Ned" is in great danger. Later it turns out she has followed John Jasper from London, and he told her something in his state of intoxication. Jasper is the only person who calls Edwin Drood "Ned".
3. On the day Edwin is reported missing, Jasper is informed by Mr Grewgious, Rosa's guardian, that she and Edwin have broken off their engagement. Jasper collapses in a state of shock; the implication is that he may have murdered Edwin unnecessarily.
4. Rosa Bud has always been afraid of John Jasper, and in the afternoon of a warm day, half a year after Edwin's disappearance, he tells her his love for her might be enough even to have disposed of his beloved nephew.
5. Princess Puffer tries to follow Jasper; she suspects him of something because of what he said during his opium intoxication. Jasper says to her at the end of what exists of the book: "Suppose you had something in your mind; something you were going to do ... Should you do it in your fancy, when you were lying here doing this? ... I did it over and over again. I have done it hundreds of thousands of times in this room."
6. The very first hint (Mr Jasper being concerned about what he may say while in an opium stupor) occurs in the first pages, when Mr Jasper listens to other opium users and says "unintelligible!" On his last opium trip, Princess Puffer says to him, while he sleeps: "'Unintelligible' I heard you say, of two more than me. But don't ye be too sure always; don't ye be too sure, beauty!"
7. On the day of Edwin's disappearance, Jasper was in an ebullient state of mind all day, performing in the choir with great self-command.
8. Another possible hint is hidden in the name of Edwin Drood. If seven of the ten letters in his name are rearranged, they spell the word DROWNED. So it is possible that Edwin suffered the same fate as his mother, who also drowned.
9. "The Spike that Intervenes: How I Accidentally Solved Drood" is a new theory published in the summer 2024 edition of The Dickensian that attempts to unmask the real villain. Mark Wheats uses empirical evidence to contend that the main clue resides in the very first paragraph of the novel, where Dickens wrote, "What IS the spike that intervenes, and who has set it up?" Wheats argues, "if we find the spike, we find the villain", and that the figure at the top of the spiral staircase on the cover of the novel is not pointing to the choirmaster John Jasper (as if accusing him), but rather to the verger Mr Tope, who is holding "the spike that intervenes" -- the verger's mace. Wheats shows that Dickens wrote of the mace in his manuscript, but chose not to include it in chapter 9 because he did not want to tip readers off too early regarding the identity of the story's villain. Wheats also contends that "The Thorn of Anxiety" referred to five times in chapter 11 and once in chapter 20 is also "the spike that intervenes", as a thorn is a spike in miniature. Wheats then argues that Mr Tope (whose name is a verb meaning "to drink alcohol to excess") is merely a henchman, and that the main villain is the senior clergyman of the cathedral, the Dean. Using further literary evidence, Wheats concludes the Dean's guilt, citing Dickens's notes and use of personification.

=== Dick Datchery ===
Datchery appears some time after Edwin's disappearance and keeps a close eye on Jasper. There are hints that he is in disguise, and this possibility has been taken up in adaptations of the story which try to solve the mystery:

- In the 1935 movie production of the story, starring Claude Rains as Jasper, Datchery is Neville Landless in disguise.
- In the 1985 Rupert Holmes musical, the character of Datchery is initially played by the actress who also plays Edwin Drood, but can be voted by the audience to be revealed by Princess Puffer to be Rosa Bud, Neville Landless, Helena Landless, Bazzard or Crisparkle.
- In Leon Garfield's continuation, which was adapted for BBC Radio 4 in 1990 starring Ian Holm as Jasper and John Moffatt as Datchery, Datchery is a former actor turned private investigator hired by Mr Grewgious to investigate Drood's disappearance.
- In the 2012 BBC television drama, written by Gwyneth Hughes, Datchery is Mr Bazzard.
- In the 2020 BBC Radio 4 adaptation (see "Radio adaptations" below), Datchery is a disguised Helena Landless.

== Original publication ==
The Mystery of Edwin Drood was scheduled to be published in twelve instalments (fewer than Dickens's usual twenty) from April 1870 to February 1871, each costing one shilling and illustrated by Luke Fildes. Only six of the instalments were completed before Dickens's death in 1870. It was therefore approximately half-finished.

- I: April 1870 (chapters 1–5)
- II: May 1870 (chapters 6–9)
- III: June 1870 (chapters 10–12)
- IV: July 1870 (chapters 13–16)
- V: August 1870 (chapters 17–20)
- VI: September 1870 (chapters 21–23)

Planned instalments never published:

- VII: October 1870
- VIII: November 1870
- IX: December 1870
- X: January 1871
- XI, XII: February 1871

== Continuations ==
Supplying a conclusion to The Mystery of Edwin Drood has occupied writers from Dickens's death to the present day. The first three attempts to complete the story were undertaken by Americans. The first, by Robert Henry Newell, published under the pen name Orpheus C. Kerr in 1870, was as much a parody as a continuation, transplanting the story to the United States. It is a "burlesque" farce rather than a serious attempt to continue in the spirit of the original story.

The second ending was written by Henry Morford, a New York journalist. He travelled to Rochester with his wife and published the ending serially during his stay in England from 1871 to 1872. In this ending, Edwin Drood survives Jasper's murder attempt. Datchery is Bazzard in disguise, but Helena disguises herself as well to overhear Jasper's mumbling under the influence of opium. It was titled John Jasper's Secret: Sequel to Charles Dickens' Mystery of Edwin Drood. Newspaper articles from 1870 confirmed that the story would be completed and authored by Charles Dickens, Jr and Wilkie Collins, despite Collins's disavowal. The illustrative green cover for the book was designed by Charles Allston Collins, who was Charles Dickens's son-in-law and Wilkie Collins's brother.

The third attempt was perhaps the most unusual. In 1873, a Brattleboro, Vermont, printer, Thomas Power James, published a version which he claimed had been literally 'ghost-written' by him channelling Dickens's spirit. A sensation was created: several critics praised this version, including Arthur Conan Doyle, himself a spiritualist, who said it was similar in style to Dickens's work; and for several decades the James version of Edwin Drood was common in America. Other Drood scholars disagree. John C. Walters dismissed it with contempt, stating that the work "is self-condemned by its futility, illiteracy, and hideous American mannerisms; the mystery itself becomes a nightmare, and the solution only deepens the obscurity."

Four of the most recent of the posthumous collaborations are The Mystery of Edwin Drood by Leon Garfield (1980), The Decoding of Edwin Drood (1980) by Charles Forsyte, The Disappearance of Edwin Drood, a Holmesian pastiche by Peter Rowland (1992), and The Mystery of Edwin Drood by David Madden (2011). The D Case (1989) offered a humorous literary critique by the Italian duo Fruttero & Lucentini.

== Trial of John Jasper ==
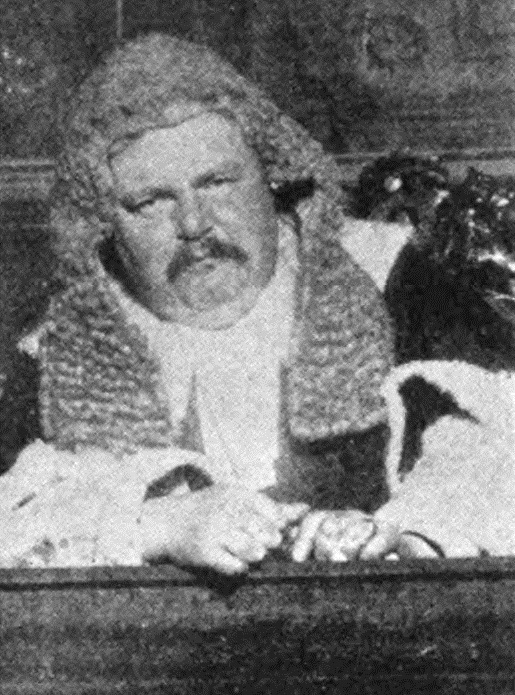
Chesterton as the judge

On 7 January 1914, the Dickens Fellowship organised a dramatic "trial" in the King's Hall, Covent Garden, in which John Jasper stood accused of the murder of Edwin Drood. Appearing as witnesses in "court" were five characters from the Dickens novel, as well as a jury and court officials, mostly played by writers, actors and other leading personalities of the day.

G. K. Chesterton, best known for the Father Brown mystery stories, was the judge. The author of The Complete Edwin Drood, J. Cuming Walters, led the prosecution, while W. Walter Crotch and Cecil Chesterton acted for the defence, and the latter's future wife, Ada Elizabeth Jones (appearing under her pseudonym Miss J. K. Prothero) was Princess Puffer. Bransby Williams, well-known for his stage monologues as Dickens characters, was Anthony Durdles. Authors and scholars Arthur Waugh, C. Sheridan Jones and Mrs Laurence Clay, played Crisparkle, Bazzard and Helena Landless respectively, while the part of John Jasper was taken by amateur actor Frederick T. Harry.

Foreman of the jury was George Bernard Shaw. Other jurors were selected from a list of nineteen named in the programme. A copy of this, annotated by its original owner, suggests that the others on the jury bench were William Wymark Jacobs, William Pett Ridge, Tom Gallon, William de Morgan, Arthur Morrison, Raymond Paton, Francesco Berger, Ridgwell Callum, Justin Huntly McCarthy, Oscar Browning and William Archer.

Proceedings were very light-hearted; Shaw in particular made wisecracks at the expense of others present. For instance, Shaw said that if the prosecution thought that producing evidence would influence the jury then "he little knows his functions".

The jury returned a verdict of manslaughter, Shaw stating that it was a compromise on the grounds that there was not enough evidence to convict Jasper but that they did not want to run the risk of being murdered in their beds. Both sides protested and demanded that the jury be discharged. Shaw said the jury would be only too pleased to be discharged. Chesterton ruled that the mystery of Edwin Drood was insoluble and fined everyone, except himself, for contempt of court.

== Adaptations ==
=== Films ===
There have been four film adaptations of The Mystery of Edwin Drood. The first two are silent pictures, released in 1909 (British, directed by Arthur Gilbert), and 1914 (American, directed by Herbert Blaché and Tom Terriss), and are unavailable to the general public and have been little seen since they were released. They were followed by:

- Mystery of Edwin Drood (1935) released by Universal Pictures and directed by Stuart Walker, starring Claude Rains as Jasper, Douglass Montgomery as Neville, Heather Angel as Rosa, Valerie Hobson as Helena, and David Manners as Drood.
- The Mystery of Edwin Drood (1993) starring Robert Powell as John Jasper, Andrew Sachs as Durdles, Freddie Jones as Mayor Sapsea, Glyn Houston as Mr Grewgious and Gemma Craven as Miss Twinkleton.

=== Television ===
The Mystery of Edwin Drood (1960) was a British television miniseries produced by ITV and broadcast live in eight episodes, starring Donald Sinden as John Jasper, Richard Pearson as Mr Crisparkle, Tim Seely as Edwin Drood, and Barbara Brown as Rosa Bud, with each episode featuring an introduction by actor Michael Ingrams. This serial is believed to have been lost during the archival purges in the 1960s and 70s, as no audio or video recordings are known to exist. Photographs taken from contemporary newspaper clippings exist in the BFI's library.

A BBC television version, adapted with an original ending by Gwyneth Hughes and directed by Diarmuid Lawrence, aired on BBC Two on 10 and 11 January 2012 and in the PBS series Masterpiece on 15 April 2012.

Taina Edvina Druda (The Mystery of Edwin Drood) is a TV miniseries produced in Russia in 1980, adapted by Georgiy Kapralov and Alexander Orlov, directed by Alexander Orlov and with music by Eduard Artemiev. The cast included Valentin Gaft, Avangard Leontiev, Elena Koreneva and Margarita Terekhova. The performance ends at the same point as Dickens's unfinished text; the narrator then discusses various possible solutions that Dickens might have intended, and assesses their plausibility.

=== Radio ===
In September 1941 the BBC Home Service broadcast a 3-episode adaptation of The Mystery of Edwin Drood by Audrey Lucas. The last instalment did not present a solution, but allowed the characters to discuss among themselves how their creator intended to end the story.

On 5 and 12 January 1953, the CBS Suspense radio programme aired a two-part adaptation of The Mystery of Edwin Drood. It depicts John Jasper (played by Herbert Marshall) as the killer, tricked into giving himself away.

In 1965, for Radio 4's long-running "Saturday Night Theatre", Mollie Hardwick adapted the novel and suggested an ending. The cast included Francis de Wolff as the Narrator, John Gabriel as John Jasper, Mary Wimbush as Princess Puffer, Patrick Barr as Crisparkle, Malcolm Terris as Edwin Drood, Rosalind Shanks as Rosa, Nigel Graham as Neville Landless, Isabel Rennie as Helena Landless and Denys Blakelock as Mr Grewgious. It was repeated on 4 October 1970. The play is held in the BBC Archives (T42136, 89'40"), and an off-air recording exists; this may be heard online

A five-part adaptation based on the Leon Garfield completion written by David Buck and directed by Gordon House was broadcast as BBC Radio 4's Classic Serial from 3 to 30 March 1990. The cast included Ian Holm as Jasper, John Moffatt as Datchery, Gareth Thomas as Crisparkle, Michael Cochrane as Tartar, Timothy Bateson as Sapsea, Gordon Gostelow as Durdles and Anna Cropper as Mrs Tope; Mary Wimbush reprised her 1965 role of Princess Puffer and John Gabriel returned to play the role of Mr Grewgious. It was last repeated on BBC Radio 4 Extra from 27 September to 1 October 2021.

A 10-part adaptation in 15-minute daily episodes, this time written by Mike Walker and directed by Jeremy Mortimer, was broadcast on BBC Radio 4 from 21 December 2020 to 1 January 2021. The cast included Pippa Nixon as Kate Dickens (who acts as both narrator and commentator), Joel MacCormack as John Jasper, Isabella Inchbald as Rosa, Damian Lynch as Crisparkle, Rachel Atkins as Princess Puffer, Maanuv Thiara as Neville Landless, Halema Hussain as Helena Landless, Peter Davison as Mr Grewgious and Iwan Davies as Edwin Drood. Some characters, including Lt Tartar and Mayor Sapsea, are omitted from this version and Bazzard, though mentioned by Mr Grewgious, does not appear. In this adaptation, Helena disguises herself as Dick Datchery, Edwin Drood survives the attack from Jasper, and Jasper kills himself by jumping from the cathedral tower after it is revealed that he was in love with Edwin, a major departure from his character and motivations in the original novel and other adaptations.

=== Theatre ===
Following almost immediately upon Charles Dickens's death, playwrights and theatre companies have mounted versions of The Mystery of Edwin Drood with varying degrees of popularity, success, and faithfulness to the original work.

A musical comedy with book, music and lyrics by Rupert Holmes proved to be the first modern major theatrical adaptation. Because Dickens's book was left unfinished, the musical hinges upon a novel idea: the audience decides by vote which of the characters is the murderer. The musical's suspect pool includes John Jasper, Neville Landless, Rosa Bud, Helena Landless, Mr Crisparkle, Princess Puffer, Mr Bazzard, and Durdles. Adding further interactivity, the audience chooses Rosa Bud, Neville Landless, Helena Landless, Mr Crisparkle or Mr Bazzard to play the role of Dick Datchery, since the cast votes that Edwin Drood actually was murdered and cannot be Dick Datchery. Further, two characters are chosen to develop a romance. Holmes wrote brief alternative endings for every possible voting outcome, even the most unlikely. For reasons of dramatic variety, John Jasper is presented as a red herring in the final solution. The audience is discouraged from voting for him, and in the final scene he confesses to the murder only for Durdles to reveal that Jasper hallucinated the attack on Drood after stumbling upon the scene of the murder, and disposed of the body thinking he had committed the crime himself.

The Mystery of Edwin Drood musical, also known during its original run simply as Drood, was first produced in 1985 by the New York Shakespeare Festival, and then transferred to Broadway, where it ran for 608 performances (and 24 previews). It won five 1986 Tonys, including Best Musical, as well as Drama Desk and Edgar awards. The show ran for ten weeks in the West End in 1987 starring Ernie Wise as Edwin Cartwright. The musical has since played successfully in numerous regional and amateur productions.

In 2012, Aria Entertainment produced a London revival of the musical at the Landor Theatre in April/May, which transferred to the Arts Theatre, West End, for a limited season from 18 May to 17 June. The cast included former Coronation Street star Wendi Peters as Princess Puffer, with Natalie Day as Edwin Drood, Daniel Robinson as John Jasper and Victoria Farley as Rosa Bud. The production was directed by Matthew Gould.

A Broadway revival by the Roundabout Theatre Company during the 2012–2013 season was directed by Scott Ellis and starred Chita Rivera as Princess Puffer and Stephanie J. Block as Edwin Drood. The final "Murderer" tabulations assigned to each of the characters and the identity of "Datchery" were displayed overhead on chalkboards in the foyer, visible to the departing audience.

== References to the book ==
- The book and several of the characters are referred to in the ghost story "An Episode of Cathedral History" by M. R. James, an admirer of Dickens. Dickens's description of the Cathedral in Drood is affectionately mocked by James when one of his characters remarks on the peculiarity of some of its practices.
- In The Long Divorce by Edmund Crispin, the protagonist adopts the pseudonym Datchery when asked to investigate a crime.
- Edwin Drood is the name of a fictional band from the TV series Jonathan Creek.
- Edwin Drood is the name of the protagonist in the novel The Man with the Golden Torc, the first novel in the Secret History series by Simon R. Green.
- The 1999 novel Disgrace by J. M. Coetzee references Edwin Drood as the novel that Lucy reads before the crime on her farm.
- A 2005 episode of the television series Doctor Who, "The Unquiet Dead", shows a fictional Charles Dickens during the Christmas before his death, in 1869, overcoming his scepticism towards the supernatural and fighting gaseous creatures together with the Ninth Doctor and Rose Tyler. The episode suggests that Dickens's last novel will be completed as The Mystery of Edwin Drood and the Blue Elementals with Edwin's killer being, not his uncle as originally intended, but rather blue creatures "not of this earth" inspired by the Gelth. The Doctor explains to Rose, however, that Dickens dies before he is able to finish the novel.
- The 2004 novel Monsieur Dick by Jean-Pierre Ohl (translated 2008 by Christine Donougher) is the story of a feud between two French Drood scholars, interposed with the unreliable journal of a young Frenchman who visits Dickens shortly before he dies.
- The 2009 novel Drood by Dan Simmons is a fictionalised account of the last five years of Dickens's life and the writing of and inspirations for the novel.
- The 2009 novel The Last Dickens by Matthew Pearl is a fictionalised account of events after Dickens's death related to his unfinished novel.
- In Assassin's Creed: Syndicate, there is a cut scene where the main character Jacob has a chance encounter with Dickens, who loses some pages from his notes, possibly causing the novel to be unfinished. A mission within the game regarding a murder investigation ostensibly provides Dickens with the inspiration for the novel.
- A 2012 episode of the Dickensian pastiche comedy radio series Bleak Expectations, A Writerly Life Made Dreadfully Different, sees the narrator Sir Philip 'Pip' Bin compete in a novel-writing contest with Charles Dickens for the title of Britain's greatest author. It is revealed that Dickens was Bin's arch-nemesis Gently Benevolent in disguise, having kidnapped the real Dickens and forced him to write The Mystery of Edwin Drood as a submission. Harry Biscuit, Bin's best friend, enraged by Bin's theft of his novel and under demonic possession from the Pen of Penrith, kills Dickens with a bust of him and eats the ending of Edwin Drood.
- Mr Crisparkle and Mrs Tisher appear as characters in the BBC One television series Dickensian.
- The 2022 novel Solving Drood by Mark Wheats uses the solution to the mystery as a MacGuffin for which the main characters search.
- The 2024 Murdoch Mysteries episode "What the Dickens?!" features George Crabtree and his wife Effie attending a Drood-themed party to celebrate Dickens's birthday.

== Sources ==
- Walters, J. Cuming, ed. (1913). The Complete Mystery of Edwin Drood by Charles Dickens; the History, Continuations, and Solutions (1870–1912). Boston: Dana Estes – via Internet Archive.
