= Luciano Onder =

Italian journalist and science broadcaster

- Born: 11 July 1943 (age 82); Arsiè, Italy
- Occupations: Journalist, science communicator
- Years active: 1966–present
- Awards: – 2004: Premio Saint-Vincent Servizi o rubriche televisive nazionali: 2013: Ischia International Journalism Award; 2014: Honorary degree in Medicine, University of Parma

Luciano Onder (11 July 1943) is an Italian journalist and science broadcaster, best known for presenting the shows Medicina 33 and TG5 Salute.

== Biography ==
Born in 1943, he graduated with a degree in Modern History in 1965 with Renzo De Felice. He taught at Sapienza University and began working in RAI in 1966 to create the series Birth of a dictatorship with Sergio Zavoli.

In 2002 the director Mauro Mazza appointed him vice-director of TG2.

On 31 March 2014 the University of Parma awarded him an honorary degree in medicine and surgery with the following rationale: "The correct and rigorous medical informations given by Onder has contributed to medical-scientific disclosure in general, thus managing to get closer public opinion and ordinary people to very importante themes."

Until September 2014 he presented Medicine 33, in TG2 news.

From September 2014 he joined the TG5 and TgCom24 team, where he took care of the TG5 Health sections.

He also runs La casa della salute, medicine program on San Marino RTV.

== Broadcasts ==
- Medicina 33 (1966–1975; Rete 2, 1976–1983; Rai 2, 1983–2014)
- TG2 Salute (Rai 2, 1995–2008)
- La casa della salute (San Marino RTV, from 2013)
- TG5 (Canale 5, from 2014)
- TgCom24 (from 2014)
- La salute prima di tutto – in Mattino Cinque (Canale 5, from 2015)
- TG5 Salute (Canale 5, from 2016)

== Honours ==

Medaglia al merito della sanità pubblica, 2 April 2003

Knight of Order of Merit of the Italian Republic, Rome, 2 June 2004
