= The Sunday Woman =

Crime novel by Carlo Fruttero and Franco Lucentini

- First edition (publ. Mondadori)
- Author: Carlo Fruttero and Franco Lucentini
- Original title: La donna della domenica
- Translator: William Weaver
- Genre: Crime fiction
- Publication date: 1972

The Sunday Woman (Italian: La donna della domenica) is a crime novel by Italian authors Carlo Fruttero and Franco Lucentini, first published in 1972. It was subsequently translated into English by William Weaver in 1973.

The novel is set in the city of Turin, and deals with the investigation of commissioner Santamaria about the murder of an architect of dubious fame, Garrone. Among the protagonists are Anna Carla Dosio, a beautiful and rich woman, and her friend Massimo Campi, a rich homosexual, who, while playing an intellectual game, had the architect Garrone killed in a letter. Later in the novel, Campi's boyfriend, Lello, a municipal clerk who was investigating by himself on the murder, is also killed. In the end of the novel, suspicions against the two are raised when Santamaria discovers that Garrone had been killed for his blackmailing, related to a project for a new quarter of buildings, against an old woman.

The book is notable for its ironic portrait of Turin's bourgeoisie. It is also considered one of the first examples of modern Italian crime novels.

== Film adaptation ==
A film adaptation of the same name, directed by Luigi Comencini, was released in 1976, starring Marcello Mastroianni as Santamaria, Jacqueline Bisset as Anna Carla and Jean-Louis Trintignant as Massimo.
