= Gianfranco Funari =

Italian pundit and television presenter (1932–2008)

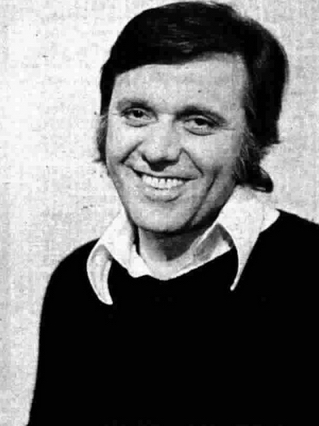
- Gianfranco Funari in Radiocorriere magazine, 1972
- Born: 21 March 1932; Rome, Italy
- Died: 12 July 2008 (aged 76); Milan, Italy
- Occupations: Presenter; writer; actor
- Height: 1.73 m (5 ft 8 in)

Gianfranco Funari (21 March 1932 – 12 July 2008) was an Italian television host, writer, stand-up comedian and actor.

== Biography ==
Funari was born in Rome, where his father was a coachman. After working as a croupier in casinos in Hong Kong and Saint Vincent, he was introduced to stand-up comedy by actor Oreste Lionello, who had spotted him doing an amateur performance in a Roman nightclub. Funari then specialized in satirical monologues, and in 1970 he made his television debut in the RAI variety show La domenica è un'altra cosa.

In 1980 Funari debuted as TV host and writer with the Telemontecarlo program Torti in faccia. In 1981 he created the successful political talk show Aboccaperta, which was first broadcast on Telemontecarlo and from 1984 to 1987 on Rai 2. Other television shows he wrote and hosted also include Mezzogiorno è (Rai 2, 1987–90), Mezzogiorno italiano (Italia 1, 1991), Zona Franca (a TV show he hosted on a network on 75 local TV station following a series of disagreements over his political freedom with Mediaset, 1992); Funari news (Rete 4, 1993-4), Napoli capitale (Rai 2, 1995-6), A tu per tu (Canale 5, 2000) and the Saturday night show Apocalypse Show (Rai 1, 2007).

In 1994 Funari was invited to edit the newspaper L'Indipendente where he also worked as a columnist. He was also a television critic for the magazine Il Borghese.

Funari died on July 12, 2008, at the San Raffaele Hospital in Milan, where he was hospitalized for five months for lung and heart problems.

== Bibliography ==
- Gianfranco Funari. Il potere in mutande: il dito nell'occhio della TV italiana, Rizzoli, 2009. ISBN 8817032905.
- Massimo Emanuelli. Gianfranco Funari. Il "giornalaio" più famoso d'Italia, Greco & Greco, 2009. ISBN 9788879804684.
