= Marco Balestri =

Italian author and radio talk show host

Marco Balestri (born 8 November 1953 in Perugia) is an Italian author and radio talk show host. He has hosted shows like Per la strada, "Bubusette", Scherzi a parte.
