= Carlo Fruttero =

Italian writer, journalist, translator and editor

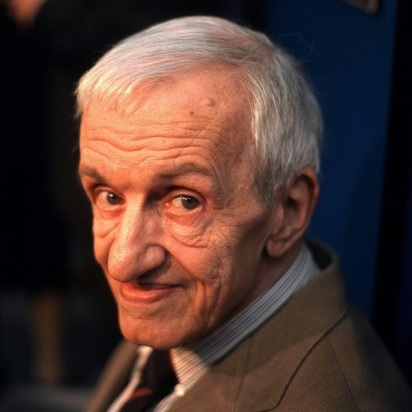
- Born: 19 September 1926; Turin, Kingdom of Italy
- Died: 15 January 2012 (aged 85); Roccamare, Castiglione della Pescaia, Italy
- Resting place: Garden cemetery of Castiglione della Pescaia
- Occupations: Novelist; journalist; translator; editor
- Writing career
- Pen name: F&L (together with Franco Lucentini)
- Period: 1961–2012
- Genres: Mainstream fiction; crime fiction

Carlo Fruttero (19 September 1926 – 15 January 2012) was an Italian writer, journalist, translator and editor of anthologies.

Fruttero was born in Turin, Italy. He is mostly known for his joint work with Franco Lucentini, especially as authors of crime novels. The duo were also editors of the science-fiction series Urania from the 1960s to the 1980s, and of the comic-strip magazine Il Mago.

Fruttero died in Roccamare, Castiglione della Pescaia, in 2012, aged 85.

== Bibliography ==
- Volti a perdere (1999)
- Visibilità zero (1999; bylined as "Fruttero & Fruttero" – playing on the usual "Fruttero & Lucentini" – tells with more humour than satire the story of the imaginary member of parliament Aldo Slucca)
- Donne informate sui fatti (2006)
- Ti trovo un po' pallida (2007; see below, under the joint works with Lucentini)
- Mutandine di chiffon (2010; autobiographical writings)
- with Massimo Gramellini: La Patria, bene o male, Mondadori, Milano 2010. ISBN 978-88-04-60329-0.

=== Works with Franco Lucentini ===
- Il secondo libro della fantascienza (1961; the first of several successful anthologies of science fiction short stories edited by F&L; lit. 'The second science fiction book')
- L'idraulico non verrà (1971; poetry collection; lit. 'The plumber will not come')
- La donna della domenica (1972, translated into English by William Weaver as The Sunday Woman in 1973; the first and most famous novel by F&L, and one of the first examples of Italian crime novels)
- L'Italia sotto il tallone di F&L (1974; a humorous political fantasy in which Fruttero & Lucentini become dictators of Italy with the help of Muammar al-Gaddafi; the novel was inspired by the actual harsh reaction of the embassy of Libya to a satirical article by F&L in La Stampa, very critical of Gaddafi; lit. 'Italy under F[ruttero] & L[ucentini]'s heel')
- Il significato dell'esistenza (1974; lit. 'The meaning of existence')
- A che punto è la notte (1979; crime novel; lit. 'What of the night', as in the Bible, Isaiah 21:11).
- La cosa in sé (1982; play "in two acts and a licence" about a man who realises that solipsism is real and all the universe is created by his mind; lit. 'The thing in itself', as in the philosophical term)
- Il Palio delle contrade morte (1983, lit. 'The Palio of the dead quarters')
- Ti trovo un po' pallida (1983; a ghost story set in sunny Tuscany, originally appeared in the L'Espresso magazine in 1979; it was actually written by Fruttero alone, as explained in the afterword to the 2007 edition; lit. 'You look quite pale')
- La prevalenza del cretino (1985; a collection of "L'Agenda di F. & L." columns form the newspaper La Stampa, about all forms of stupidity; lit. 'The supremacy of the cretin')
- Il colore del destino (1987; collection of three novellas: Notizie dagli scavi (by Lucentini) and Ti trovo un po' pallida (by Fruttero), already published, and Il colore del destino (written jointly); it is the only book by the two authors having the byline "Lucentini & Fruttero" rather than "Fruttero & Lucentini"; lit. 'The colour of destiny')
- La verità sul caso D (1989, translated into English by Gregory Dowling as The D. Case: or The Truth about the Mystery of Edwin Drood; a completion and elaboration on Dickens' The Mystery of Edwin Drood; lit. 'The truth on the D case')
- L'amante senza fissa dimora (1986; a novel about a successful Italian woman meeting a mysterious man in romantic Venice: an apparently standard love story with a twist; published in English by Chatto & Windus in 1999 as "No fixed abode")
- Storie americane di guerra (1991, editor; anthology of "American war stories")
- Enigma in luogo di mare (1991; crime novel set in a seaside community in Tuscany; lit. 'Riddle in a sea town')
- Il ritorno del cretino (1992; more columns from "La Stampa"; lit. 'The comeback of the cretin')
- Breve storia delle vacanze (1994; lit. 'Short history of vacations')
- La morte di Cicerone (1995; lit. 'Cicero's death')
- Il nuovo libro dei nomi di battesimo (1998; a non-fiction handbook about how to choose a name for a son, with amusing information and trivia on names' meaning and use)
- Il cretino in sintesi (2002; still more columns from "La Stampa"; lit. 'The cretin in synthesis')
- Viaggio di nozze al Louvre (2002; lit. 'Honeymoon at the Louvre')
- I nottambuli (2002; lit. 'The nightwalkers')
- I ferri del mestiere (2003; a collection of articles and short stories edited by Domenico Scarpa; lit. 'The tools of the trade')
