= Gigi Sabani =

Italian impersonator, TV presenter and singer (1952–2007)

Luigi Sabani
- Gigi Sabani
- Born: 5 October 1952; Rome, Italy
- Died: 4 September 2007 (aged 54); Rome, Italy
- Occupations: Impersonator; television personality
- Years active: 1970–2007
- Height: 1.80 m (5 ft 11 in)

Luigi "Gigi" Sabani (5 October 1952 – 4 September 2007) was an Italian TV impersonator.

== Biography and career ==
Born in Rome, Sabani made his television debut in the late 1970s as an impersonator: his most famous imitations included those of Adriano Celentano and Mike Bongiorno. From 1983 to 1986 he hosted the Italian version of the show The Price Is Right (OK, il prezzo è giusto!) along with (and later succeeded by) Italian singer Iva Zanicchi. He participated at Festival di Sanremo in 1989. His best-known song was A me mi torna in mente una canzone (1983). In 1997, he was implicated in a judicial case for fraud in sexual matters and induction to prostitution: he was arrested, but was discharged as the case was filed, and Sabani claimed damages. That was an abrupt halt to a blooming career, that made him from the early 1980s one of the most popular artists of the Italian TV.

On 4 September 2007, just 31 days before he would have turned 55, he died of myocardial infarction while visiting his sister. His fiancée, actress Raffaella Ponzo, found out days later that she was pregnant with his child. She gave birth to his son on 19 May 2008.
