= Luigi Comencini =

Italian film director

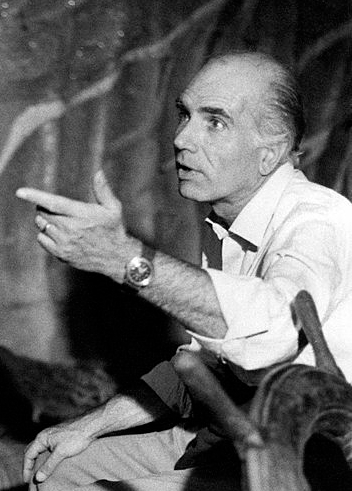
- Comencini in 1971
- Born: 8 June 1916; Salò, Lombardy, Kingdom of Italy
- Died: 6 April 2007 (aged 90); Rome, Lazio, Italy
- Occupation: Film director
- Years active: 1937–1991
- Children: 4, including Cristina and Francesca
- Relatives: Carlo Calenda (grandson)

Luigi Comencini (Italian: [luˈiːdʒi komenˈtʃiːni]; 8 June 1916 – 6 April 2007) was an Italian film director. Together with Dino Risi, Ettore Scola, and Mario Monicelli, he was considered among the masters of the commedia all'italiana genre.

His daughters Cristina and Francesca are both film directors.

== Biography ==
His first successful film was The Emperor of Capri, featuring Totò. Comencini's 1953 Bread, Love and Dreams, with Vittorio De Sica and Gina Lollobrigida, is considered a primary example of neorealismo rosa (pink neorealism). It was followed by Bread, Love and Jealousy.

After first directing Alberto Sordi in The Belle of Rome (1955), Comencini again worked with Sordi in what is considered his masterwork, Everybody Go Home, a bitter comedy about Italy after the armistice of 1943. The film won the Special Golden Prize at the 2nd Moscow International Film Festival. Also set in World War II, but devoted to the Italian partisans, is Bébo's Girl (1963). This was followed by Misunderstood (1966, based on the English novel by Florence Montgomery).

Comencini obtained an outstanding success with what is ranked amongst the best productions of Italian television, The Adventures of Pinocchio (1972). In the same year, he directed the feature film The Scientific Cardplayer, a dark comedy with Sordi and Silvana Mangano. In 1975, he released the mystery The Sunday Woman, featuring Marcello Mastroianni, Jacqueline Bisset and Jean-Louis Trintignant.

Comencini's subsequent works were characterised by the presence of famous Italian actors of the time: Ugo Tognazzi in The Cat (1977), or Nino Manfredi in his episode of Basta che non si sappia in giro. In the 1980s, Comencini's movies met with less success, but his Cuore television series of 1984 was praised.

He died in Rome after a long illness in 2007.

== Filmography ==
- Bambini in città (1947)
- Hey Boy (1948)
- The Emperor of Capri (1949)
- L'ospedale del delitto (1950)
- Behind Closed Shutters (1950)
- Heidi (1952)
- Girls Marked Danger (1953)
- La valigia dei sogni (1953)
- Bread, Love and Dreams (1953)
- Bread, Love and Jealousy (1954)
- The Belle of Rome (1955)
- The Window to Luna Park (1957)
- Husbands in the City (1957)
- Mogli pericolose (1958)
- Le sorprese dell'amore (1959)
- And That on Monday Morning (1959)
- Everybody Go Home (1960)
- On the Tiger's Back (1961)
- The Police Commissioner (1962)
- La ragazza di Bube (1963)
- Three Nights of Love (1964)
- My Wife (1964)
- Il compagno Don Camillo (1965)
- Six Days a Week (La bugiarda) (1965)
- The Dolls (1965, episode "Il trattato di eugenetica")
- Misunderstood (Incompreso) (1966)
- Italian Secret Service (1968)
- Giacomo Casanova: Childhood and Adolescence (1969)
- Unknown Woman (1969)
- The Adventures of Pinocchio (1972, TV series)
- The Scientific Cardplayer (1973)
- Somewhere Beyond Love (1974)
- Till Marriage Do Us Part (1974)
- The Sunday Woman (1975)
- Basta che non si sappia in giro (1976, episode "L'equivoco)
- Strange Occasion (1976)
- Goodnight, Ladies and Gentlemen (1976)
- The Cat (1977)
- Traffic Jam (1978)
- Eugenio (1980)
- Cercasi Gesù (1982)
- Cuore (1984, TV series)
- La Storia (1986)
- A Boy from Calabria (1987)
- La Bohème (1988)
- Merry Christmas... Happy New Year (1989)
- Marcellino (1991)
