= Sei forte, maestro =

- Genre: Comedy-drama
- Created by: Patrizia Fassio; Domenico Matteucci
- Starring: Emilio Solfrizzi; Gaia De Laurentiis; Gastone Moschin; Valeria Fabrizi; Federica Citarella; Francesca Rettondini; Massimo Ciavarro
- Country of origin: Italy
- Original language: [[Italian language]|Italian]]
- No. of seasons: 2
- No. of episodes: 52

Production
- Running time: 50 minutes

Original release
- Network: Canale 5
- Release: June 11, 2000 – August 5, 2001

Sei forte, maestro is an Italian comedy-drama television series produced in 1999 that aired from 2000 to 2001 on Canale 5. Created by Patrizia Fassio and Domenico Matteucci, the show comprises two seasons with a total of 52 episodes.

== Plot ==
=== First Season ===
Emilio Ricci (Emilio Solfrizzi), a young elementary school teacher from Milan, returns to his hometown of Terni to cover a substitute position at the private school where his old friend Giulio (Massimo Ciavarro) is the principal. While there, he moves back in with his father Vittorio (Gastone Moschin) and Vittorio’s new partner, Lucina (Valeria Fabrizi). Emilio quickly bonds with his new colleagues, especially the students, and always tries to help them with their small and large problems, both at school and in their personal lives.

Emilio is later joined by his teenage daughter Sabrina (Federica Citarella), who decides to live with him after her parents’ separation. He must rebuild his relationship with her while also reconnecting with Claudia (Francesca Rettondini), an aspiring actress with whom he had a past fling. Claudia pulls him into another turbulent romance.

Helping Emilio is Barbara (Gaia De Laurentiis), a fellow teacher and neighbor, who is also Giulio’s longtime girlfriend. Emilio finds himself drawn to her despite their complicated situation. Amid small and big adventures, Emilio and Barbara fall in love, but both deny their feelings because they are still involved with other partners. Things become even more complicated when Giulio proposes to Barbara, and although she hesitates, she accepts.

Meanwhile, thanks to the scheming of Emilio and Sabrina, Claudia finally achieves her dream of becoming an actress and moves to Rome. Realizing that Emilio is truly in love with Barbara, Claudia decides to end their relationship for good.

The day of Barbara and Giulio’s wedding arrives — which is also Emilio’s last day as a substitute teacher. Giulio, drunk, confesses to Emilio that he knows he and Barbara are in love. Faced with this revelation, Emilio chooses not to attend the wedding and immediately returns to Milan. When Barbara finds out, she is shocked and finally realizes her true feelings. With the help of Lucina, Sabrina, and Vittorio, Barbara reunites with Emilio and confesses her love.

=== Second Season ===
Emilio takes on another substitute teaching role at the same school, allowing him to enjoy a peaceful relationship with Barbara. But their serenity is short-lived as Claudia unexpectedly returns, pregnant with Emilio’s child. When Barbara finds out, she immediately leaves him. Claudia gives birth to a baby boy, Alessio, but chooses to leave him in Emilio’s care so she can focus on her acting career. Meanwhile, Barbara begins to grow close to Rocco (Raffaele Buranelli), the charming physical education teacher. The school year unfolds with its share of challenges and joys for both the teachers and the students. It’s the students themselves who come up with a plan to reunite Emilio and Barbara. After much heartache, the two finally reconcile and decide to get married.

== List of Characters ==
- Emilio Ricci, played by Emilio Solfrizzi.
  An elementary school teacher who, after returning to his hometown, must navigate a new job and a new love. He teaches Italian, art, history, geography, and civic education.
- Barbara Loriani, played by Gaia De Laurentiis.
  Giulio Labua’s longtime girlfriend, who falls in love with Emilio. She becomes a close friend to Sabrina and forms a strong bond with little Alessio. Barbara teaches science subjects, including mathematics, technology, and music education.
- Lucina Nardi, played by Valeria Fabrizi.
  Vittorio’s life partner and later wife. Lucina builds a good relationship with both Emilio and Sabrina.
- Vittorio Ricci, played by Gastone Moschin.
  Emilio's father, a retired colonel.
- Sabrina Ricci, played by Federica Citarella.
  Emilio’s daughter from his first marriage. She moves to Terni to live with her father after spending many years with her mother and her mother’s new partner.
- Claudia Martini, played by Francesca Rettondini.
  Emilio’s ex-girlfriend and the mother of his second child, Alessio. In the first season, she lives with Barbara while trying to become a television actress. In the second season, she stars in a soap opera, which limits the time she can spend with her son.
- Giulio Labua, played by Massimo Ciavarro.
  Emilio’s old friend who hires him to teach at the elementary school where he is principal. Giulio is also Barbara’s boyfriend, whom she leaves shortly before their wedding. His lifelong dream is to become a famous writer. He appears only in the first season.
- Lilly Calotta, played by Emanuela Grimalda.
  The school’s English teacher—sweet, cheerful, and a wonderful friend to Barbara.
- Rocco Vitale, played by Raffaele Buranelli.
  The school's gym teacher, introduced in the second season. He becomes romantically involved with Barbara, sparking Emilio’s jealousy.
- Angelo Castagnola, played by Fabio Ferrari.
  A fellow schoolteacher.
- Tito Carrozza, played by Maurizio Santilli.
  The school’s janitor—clumsy but kind and well-meaning. He is in love with the school’s cook, Maria.
- Maria Formica, played by Lucianna De Falco.
  The school’s cook—sweet, loving, and in love with Tito.
- Marzia Antoniazzi, played by Emanuela Moschin.
  The new school principal who takes over in the second season.
- Patrick, played by Luca Amorosino.
  The school's computer technician.
- Ilaria, played by Sara Bertelà.
  Sabrina's mother.
- Sandro, played by Carlo Marchetti.
  Sabrina's boyfriend.
- Bruno, played by Maurizio Amigoni.
  Lilly's husband.
- Gianlorenzo, played by Rodolfo Bigotti.
  A colleague of Claudia’s, with whom she forms a close relationship.
- Don Fausto, played by Orazio Stracuzzi.
  The parish priest of Terni.
- Sofia.
  Barbara’s beloved dog.
- Alessio Ricci.
  Emilio and Claudia’s son, and Sabrina’s younger brother. He lives with his father, sister, and grandparents, and occasionally visits his mother due to her busy acting career. Alessio is also very loved by Barbara, who often babysits him.

== See also ==
- List of Italian television series
