= Paolo De Vita =

Italian actor (born 1957)

Paolo De Vita (born 29 June 1957) is an Italian film and television actor.

Born in Bari, he debuted on television in 1984 with the TV series Aeroporto internazionale (International Airport), followed by the 1985 miniseries Un siciliano in Sicilia (A Sicilian in Sicily) directed by Pino Passalacqua. He also appeared in Don Matteo and the 2007 television series Nebbie e delitti (Killings and Mists). In 2011 he was part of the cast of the television series R.I.S. Roma 2 - Delitti imperfetti (RIS Rome 2 - Imperfect Crimes) directed by Francis Micciche.

De Vita has also had a substantial career in film, an early role being in the neo-realist film Il giudice ragazzino (The Boy Judge) in 1994. In 2001 he appeared in Nanni Moretti's La stanza del figlio (The Son's Room). He has since moved into English language cinema, playing Edward de Vere's loyal Italian retainer, in the Roland Emmerich film Anonymous (2011).

== Filmography ==
=== Cinema ===
- La visione del Sabba - directed by Marco Bellocchio (1988)
- Il nodo alla cravatta - directed by Alessandro Di Robilant (1991)
- La riffa - directed by Francesco Laudadio (1993)
- Anche i commercialisti hanno un'anima - directed by Maurizio Ponzi (1994)
- Il giudice ragazzino - directed by Alessandro Di Robilant (1994)
- La seconda volta - directed by Mimmo Calopresti (1995)
- Intolerance - directed by Cosimo Alemà and Paolo Ameli (1996)
- Artemisia - passione estrema - directed by Agnès Merlet (1997)
- La classe non è acqua - directed by Cecilia Calvi (1997)
- Mare largo - directed by Ferdinando Vicentini Orgnani (1998)
- La stanza dello scirocco - directed by Maurizio Sciarra (1998)
- La parola amore esiste - directed by Mimmo Calopresti (1998)
- Matrimoni - directed by Cristina Comencini (1998)
- La patinoire - directed by Jean-Philippe Toussaint (1998)
- Femminile, singolare - directed by Claudio Del Punta (2000)
- La stanza del figlio - directed by Nanni Moretti (2001)
- L'ultima lezione - directed by Massimo Martella and Fabio Rosi (2001)
- La vita degli altri - directed by Nicola De Rinaldo (2002)
- The Best of Youth - directed by Marco Tullio Giordana (2003)
- Amorfù - directed by Emanuela Piovano (2003)
- Zinanà directed by Pippo Mezzapesa (short) (2004)
- L'aria - directed by Daniele Prato (short) (2005)
- Mai + come prima - directed by Giacomo Campiotti (2005)
- Il caimano - directed by Nanni Moretti (2006)
- Antonio guerriero di Dio - directed by Antonello Belluco (2006)
- Nuovomondo - directed by Emanuele Crialese (2006) (voice)
- L'aria salata - directed by Alessandro Angelini (2006)
- Facciamola finita - directed by Manrico Gammarota (short) (2008)
- Made in Italy - directed by Stéphane Giusti (2008)
- Imago mortis - directed by Stefano Bessoni (2009)
- Alza la testa - directed by Alessandro Angelini (2009)
- Wedding Fever in Campobello - directed by Neele Vollmar (2009)
- Christine Cristina - directed by Stefania Sandrelli (2009)
- Qualche nuvola - directed by Saverio Di Biagio (2011)
- Che bella giornata - directed by Gennaro Nunziante (2011)
- Anonymous - directed by Roland Emmerich (2011)
- To Rome With Love - directed by Woody Allen (2012)

=== Television ===
- Aeroporto internazionale (1984)
- Un siciliano in Sicilia - directed by Pino Passalacqua (1987)
- Un inviato molto speciale - directed by Vittorio De Sisti (1991)
- Ma tu mi vuoi bene? - directed by Marcello Fondato e Nancy Fondato (1991)
- L'ombra della sera - directed by Cinzia Th. Torrini (1994)
- Torniamo a casa - directed by Valerio Jalongo (1999)
- Vola Sciusciù - directed by Joseph Sargent (2000)
- Giochi pericolosi, directed by Alfredo Angeli - film TV (2000)
- Don Matteo - directed by Andrea Barzini (2000)
- Angelo il custode - directed by Gianfrancesco Lazotti (2001)
- La guerra è finita - directed by Lodovico Gasparini (2002)
- Tutto in quella notte - directed by Massimo Spano (2002)
- Maria Goretti - directed by Giulio Base (2003)
- Maigret: La trappola - directed by Renato De Maria (2004)
- Maigret: L'ombra cinese - directed by Renato De Maria (2004)
- Don Matteo 6 - directed by Carmine Elia (2006)
- Nebbie e delitti 3 - directed by Riccardo Donna (2007)
- Crimini: La doppia vita di Natalia Blum - directed by Anna Negri (2009)
- R.I.S. Roma 2 - Delitti imperfetti - directed by Francesco Miccichè (2011)
- 6 passi nel giallo - Souvenirs - directed by Lamberto Bava (2012)
- This Is Not Hollywood: Avetrana - directed by Pippo Mezzapesa (2024)
