= Nadia Cassini =

American-Italian actress (1949–2025)

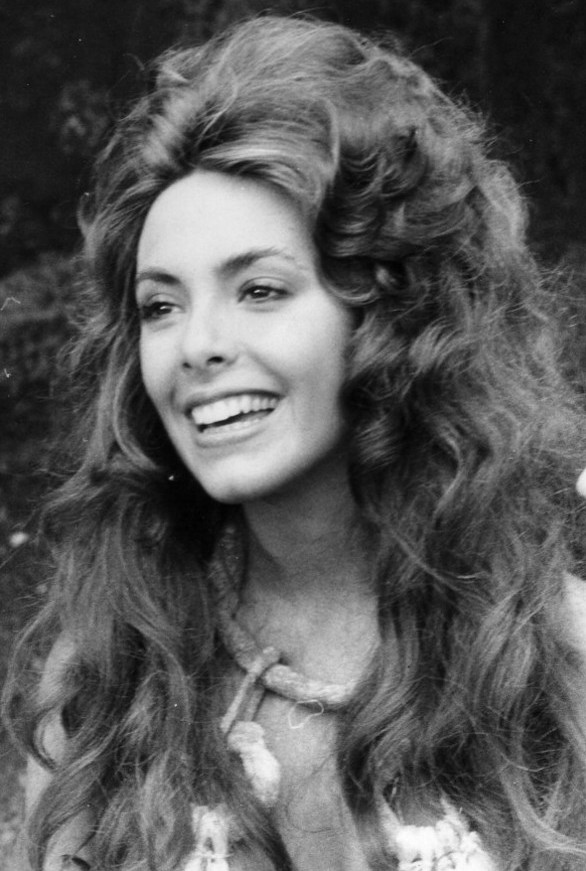
- Born: Gianna Lou Müller; January 2, 1949; Woodstock, New York, U.S.
- Died: March 18, 2025 (aged 76); Reggio Calabria, Italy
- Occupations: Actress; singer; dancer; stripper
- Spouse: Igor Cassini (m. 1969; div. 1972)
- Partner: Yorgo Voyagis
- Children: 1

Gianna Lou Cassini (née Müller; January 2, 1949 – March 18, 2025), better known by her stage name Nadia Cassini, was an American-Italian actress, singer, and showgirl who became famous in Italian exploitation films of the 1970s and early 1980s, particularly in the commedia sexy all'italiana genre in the late 1970s.

== Early life and career ==
Cassini was born on January 2, 1949, to German American Harrison Müller Sr. (1929–1998) and his Italian American wife, Patricia Müller (née Noto) (who were professional dancers and actors), during a tour in Woodstock, New York. She left her family at an early age and traveled abroad, working as a stripper. She had affairs with many wealthy men including Georges Simenon. She moved to Italy in 1968.

== Film career and after ==
Cassini obtained her first film roles by 1970, appearing in The Divorce (1970) and playing her first lead role in Piero Vivarelli's Il dio serpente the same year. Subsequently, she had roles in films such as Pulp (1972), Emmanuelle's Silver Tongue (1976) and Starcrash (1978) before reaching a great success in the commedia sexy all'italiana genre, particularly in a series of films starring Lino Banfi between 1979 and 1980, namely L'insegnante balla... con tutta la classe (1979), The Nurse in the Military Madhouse (1979), and La dottoressa ci sta col colonnello (1980).

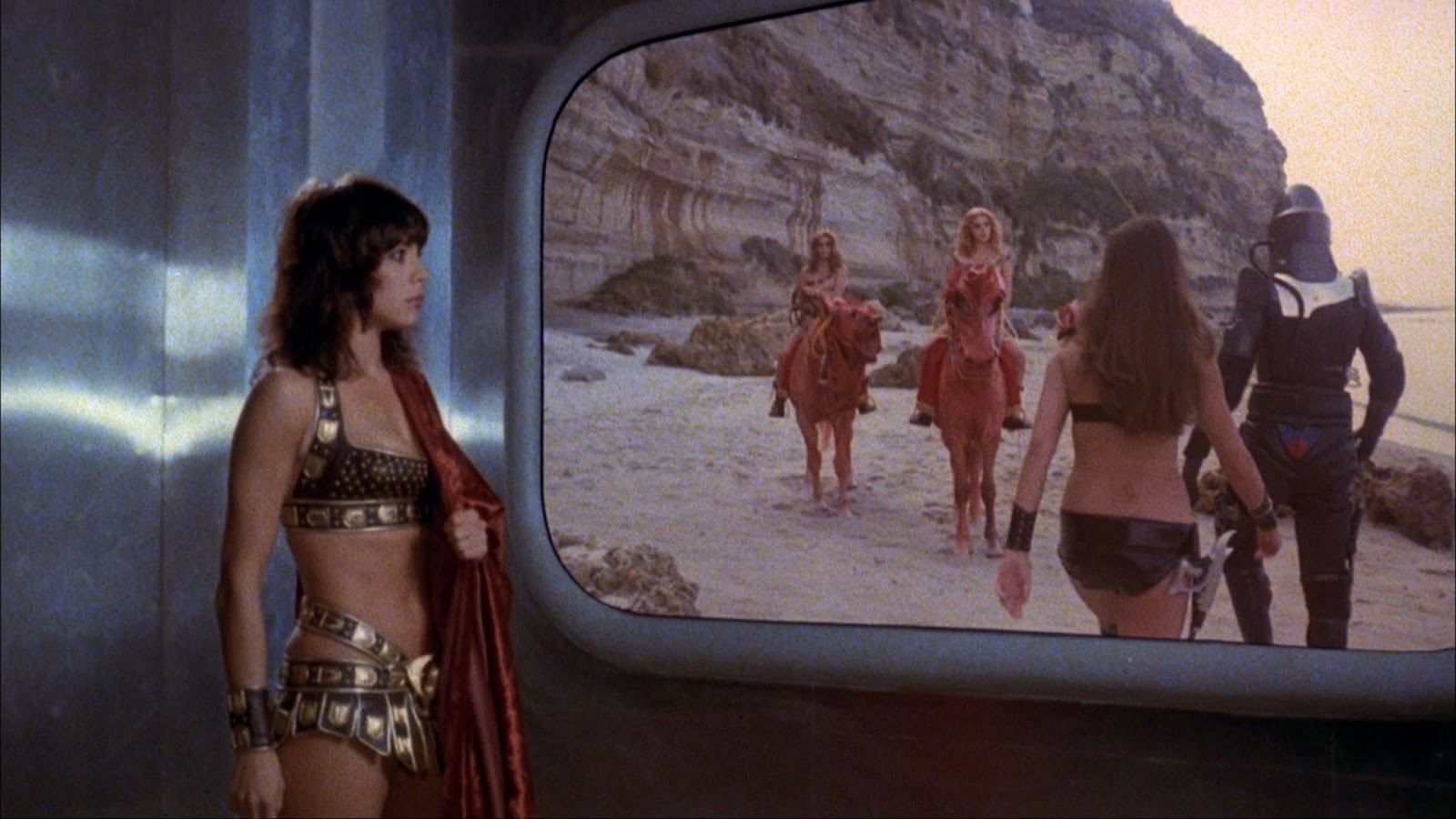
Cassini in Starcrash (1978)

In the 1980s, after appearing as a showgirl in some successful TV shows such as Drive In and Premiatissima, her face was partially disfigured and her right ear lost in a botched plastic surgery procedure.

After retiring from the Italian scene, Cassini worked for French television and later returned to the United States.

In 1978, she released her first album Encounters of a Loving Kid on the CDG record label. In 1982, she released her most famous single "When (I'm Falling in Love) / A chi la do stasera". In 1983, she released her second album Get Ready with RCA Italiana, which was her most famous album. In 1985, she released her third and final album Dreams with Five Record.

== Personal life and death ==
Cassini married Igor Cassini (1915–2002), an American journalist of Russian and Italian nobility, in 1969. She divorced Cassini in 1972 and moved to London with her boyfriend, Greek actor Yorgo Voyagis. Their daughter, Kassandra, was born in 1977 and Cassini returned to film one year later in 1978.

Nadia Cassini died following a long illness in Reggio Calabria, Italy, on March 18, 2025, at the age of 76.
