= Angelo il custode =

- Also known as: The Guardian Angel
- Genre: Comedy
- Directed by: Gianfrancesco Lazotti
- Starring: Lino Banfi; Giovanna Ralli; Edoardo Costa; Francesca Rettondini; Gian Fabio Bosco; Paolo De Vita; Mimmo Mancini; Federico Maria Galante; Sydne Rome; Anna Safroncik; Cristiana Capotondi; Giuliano Gemma; Rosanna Banfi
- Composer: Nicola Piovani
- Country of origin: Italy
- No. of seasons: 1
- No. of episodes: 8

Production
- Running time: 100 min. (episode)

Original release
- Network: Rai 1
- Release: April 1 – May 27, 2001

Angelo il custode (Italian: The Guardian Angel) is an Italian comedy television series directed by Gianfrancesco Lazotti and starring Lino Banfi as Angelo De Vita, an Italian in Argentina who must return home to prove to the Italian bureaucracy that he is still alive.

== Cast ==
- Lino Banfi: Angelo De Vita
- Giovanna Ralli: Elisa Anselmi
- Edoardo Costa: Adriano Anselmi
- Francesca Rettondini: Simona
- Gian Fabio Bosco: Giovannino
- Federico Maria Galante: Ghigo
- Cristiana Capotondi: Sara
- Giuliano Gemma: Rocco
- Rosanna Banfi: Tina

== See also ==
- List of Italian television series
