= Bellifreschi =

- Directed by: Enrico Oldoini
- Written by: Liliana Betti; Paolo Costella; Enrico Oldoini
- Produced by: Pio Angeletti; Adriano De Micheli
- Starring: Lino Banfi; Christian De Sica
- Cinematography: David Worth; Giorgio Di Battista
- Edited by: Raimondo Crociani
- Music by: Manuel De Sica
- Production companies: Dania Film; Dean Film; Reteitalia
- Release date: 27 November 1987
- Running time: 90 minutes
- Country: Italy
- Language: Italian

Bellifreschi is a 1987 Italian comedy film directed by Enrico Oldoini.

The film is a farcical take on Billy Wilder's romantic comedy Some Like It Hot.

== Cast ==
- Lino Banfi as Tommaso 'Tom' Barletta
- Christian De Sica as Mario 'Jerry' Marcelli
- Lionel Stander as Frank Santamaria
- Lisa Lavender as Sabrina
- Marina Viro as Barbara
- Monica Frassinelli as Conchita
- Rosanna Banfi as Rosanna
- Kaspar Capparoni as Sam
- Jimmy il Fenomeno as the guy from the interview
- Clarita Gatto as a waitress
- Raffaella Baracchi as a waitress
- Elena Fabrizi as herself
