= Un inviato molto speciale =

- Genre: Comedy
- Created by: Gianfranco Manfredi; Stefano Sudriè; Giovanni Romoli; Lino Banfi
- Directed by: Vittorio De Sisti
- Starring: Lino Banfi; Massimo Bellinzoni; Augusto Zucchi; Paolo Maria Scalondro; Cinzia Leone; Paolo De Vita; Gianni Ciardo; Rosanna Banfi; Moses Sesay
- Opening theme: Un inviato molto speciale by Lino Banfi
- Country of origin: Italy
- Original language: Italian
- No. of seasons: 1
- No. of episodes: 8

Production
- Executive producers: Rai 2 & Aran s.r.l.
- Camera setup: Sergio D'Offizi
- Running time: 90 min. (ep.)

Original release
- Network: Rai 2
- Release: 15 September – 27 October 1992

Un inviato molto speciale (translated: A Very Special Correspondent) is an Italian comedy television series aired in Italy from September 15 to October 27, 1992 on Rai 2. The series is set in Bari and Rome; it also moves in Africa in the penultimate episode. It revolves around the adventures of Damiano Tarantella, a RAI special correspondent. The main actor is Lino Banfi.

== Story ==
Damiano Tarantella is a middle-aged journalist who works in the RAI headquarters in Bari, by chance being the correspondent from Bari to the 90° Minuto program for the match between Bari-Juventus, where, however, he does not turns out to be fit to the role as the fan within him comes out. But this makes him famous and leads to him being called to the place in Rome where, although getting in trouble several times, he is hired. Each service, even the simplest entrusted to him, becomes full of adventures and trouble, from which, however, he always manages to come out more or less well.

== Episodes ==
#	Italian title	English title
1	Novantottesimo minuto	Ninety-eighth minute
2	Voglia di TG	Longing for Newscast
3	Se lo dice Giuditta	If Giuditta says it
4	La gemella Tarantella	The Tarantella twin
5	Poliziotto per un giorno	Cop for a day
6	Rock Tarantella	Rock Tarantella
7	Mal d'Africa	Africa-sickness
8	Quando c'è la salute	When there is health

== See also ==
- List of Italian television series
