= La dottoressa ci sta col colonnello =

1980 film by Michele Massimo Tarantini

- Directed by: Michele Massimo Tarantini
- Written by: Francesco Milizia; Michele Massimo Tarantini
- Starring: Lino Banfi; Nadia Cassini
- Cinematography: Mario Vulpiani
- Music by: Franco Campanino
- Release date: 1980
- Running time: 87 minutes
- Country: Italy
- Language: Italian

La dottoressa ci sta col colonnello (The doctor is there with Colonel) is a 1980 commedia sexy all'italiana directed by Michele Massimo Tarantini, starring Lino Banfi with Nadia Cassini. The film is a late installment of the genre, combining 1970s' soldatessa and dottoressa themes (made popular by Edwige Fenech) with abundant absurd comedy elements a year after Cassini's breakthrough film L'insegnante balla... con tutta la classe.

== Plot ==
Colonel Anacleto Punzone (Banfi) is a military doctor with expertise in organ transplantation. He has a small penis, leading to a frustrated sex life with his wife Giovanna (Malisa Longo). Furthermore, his penis size forces him to dodge sexual advances from an attractive colleague, Prof. Eva Russell (Cassini). Colonel now contemplates on the radical solution of penis transplantation, finding a potential donor in dim-witted and well-endowed Private Arturo Mazzancolla (Alvaro Vitali). During Prof. Russell's visits to the military hospital, Colonel realises that other men, including handsome Lieutenant Lancetti (Bruno Minniti) are interested in her and he feels that the operation is even more urgent; although he is not confident as it may result in some complications (like permanent erection or no erection).

== Cast ==
- Nadia Cassini - Dottoressa (Dr.) Eva Russell
- Lino Banfi - Colonnello Anacleto Punzone
- Alvaro Vitali - Arturo Mazzancolla
- Malisa Longo - Giovanna Punzone
- Bruno Minniti - Tenente Lancetti
- Lucio Montanaro - Suor Fulgenzia
- Enzo Andronico - Generale Mangiafuoco
