= Il vigile urbano =

- Genre: Comedy
- Created by: Castellano & Pipolo
- Directed by: Castellano & Pipolo
- Starring: Lino Banfi; Rosanna Banfi; Riccardo Garrone; Pippo Santonastaso; Giusy Valeri
- Country of origin: Italy
- Original language: Italian
- No. of seasons: 1
- No. of episodes: 13

Production
- Executive producers: Mario and Vittorio Cecchi Gori
- Camera setup: Nino Celeste; Sandro Grossi
- Running time: 55/60 min. (1 ep.)

Original release
- Network: Rai 1
- Release: November 9, 1989 – January 18, 1990

Il vigile urbano is an Italian comedy television series. The series is set in Rome and revolves around the adventures of the watchful Urbano Tommasi. The main actor is Lino Banfi.

== Story ==
The policeman Urban Tommasi, daily telephone call to the victim Commander of the body of the municipal police of Rome, Augusto Tafuri, asking permission to launch into one of his many companies, invariably authorization has been granted by the Commander poor exasperated. Urbano is not alone, in fact, can always count on her daughter Milena, the sweeper and his friend since childhood segli Tobia and the daily horoscopes are made by Agnese door. Urbano Tommasi runs well, every day, in many problems of a city like Rome, always helping everyone, but never able to realize his dream ... Read their own businesses and those of the body of the traffic police in the newspaper!

== Episodes in Italian ==
nº	Titolo italiano
1	Il vecchietto dove lo metto?
2	Il ladro con le scarpe gialle
3	Ivan il terribile
4	Polvere di Stelle
5	Il promesso sponsor
6	Panettoni D.O.C
7	Campa Cavallo
8	Dove sta Zàzà
9	Love Story
10	Un bebè per due
11	Suona che ti passa
12	Non ho l'età
13	Sarò famoso

== See also ==
- List of Italian television series
