= Gianfrancesco Lazotti =

Italian film screenwriter and director (born 1957)

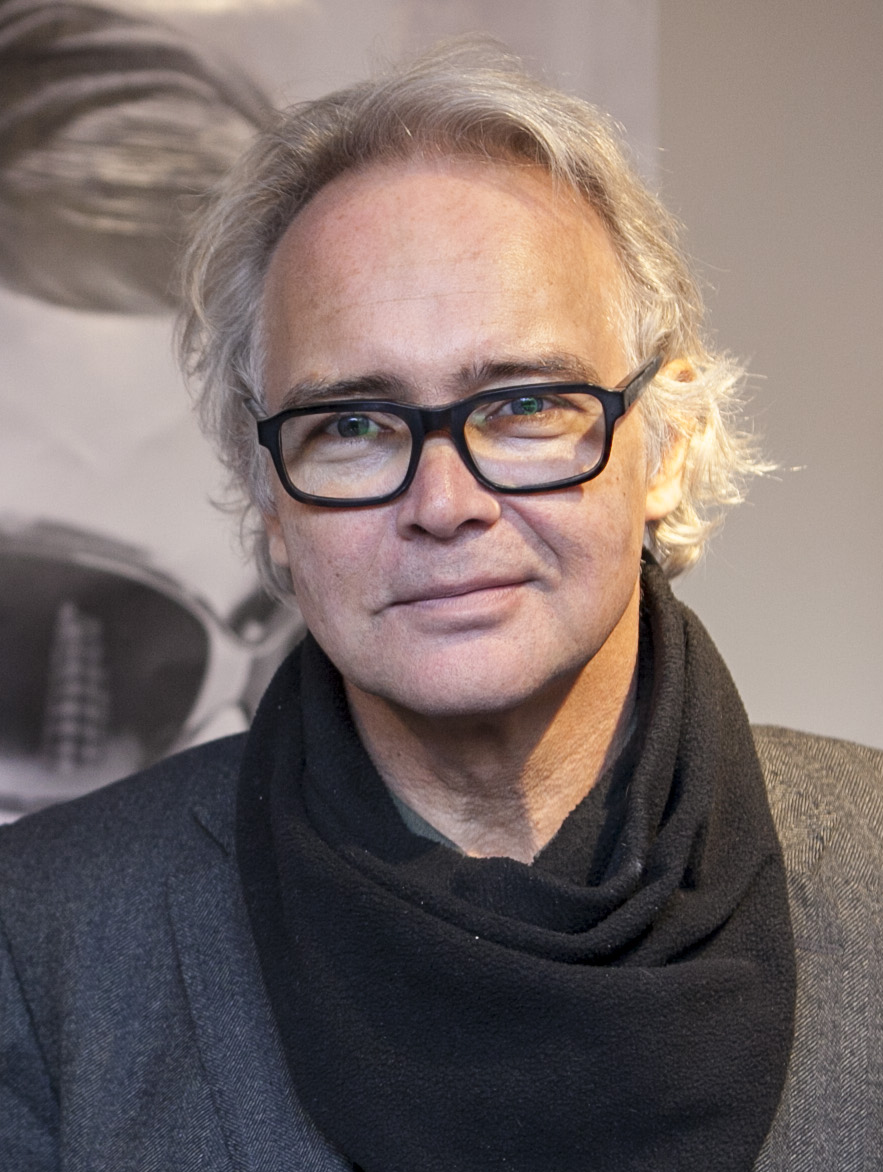

Gianfrancesco Lazotti (Rome, born 2 March 1957) is an Italian film screenwriter and director.

Born in Rome, Lazotti studied at DAMS in Bologna and apprenticed as assistant director to many well-known Italian directors, including Ettore Scola and Dino Risi. Meanwhile, he launched his own career directing commercials and hosting a show on RAI radio. In 1987 he made his feature directorial debut with Il mitico Gianluca for Italian TV. Among his subsequent credits: Schiaffi d'amore, Saremo felici, Lo sbaglio, for the omnibus feature Corsica, the TV series Chiara e gli altri (1990), I ragazzi del muretto, Linda e il brigadiere and the documentary The great Carnival of Venice.

== Filmography ==
- Piazza Navona (1988)
- Chiara e gli altri (1989)
- Saremo felici (1989)
- Senator (1990)
- Andy e Norman (1991)
- I ragazzi del muretto (1991)
- Tutti gli anni una volta l'anno (1995)
- Linda e il Brigadiere (1997)
- Misteri di Cascina Vienello (1997)
- Linda e il brigadiere 2 (1998)
- Le ragazze di Piazza di Spagna (1998)
- Valeria medico legale (2000)
- Angelo il custode (2001)
- Diritto di difesa (2005)
- Finalmente a casa (2008)
- The great Carnival of Venice (2008)
- Dalla vita in poi (2010)
- La notte è piccola per noi (2018)
