= Una storia d'amore (1969 film) =

1969 film by Michele Lupo

- Italian theatrical release poster
- Directed by: Michele Lupo
- Written by: Antonio Leonviola
- Starring: Anna Moffo; Gianni Macchia; Jean Claudio; Caterina Boratto; Gigi Ballista
- Cinematography: Guglielmo Mancori
- Edited by: Vincenzo Tomassi
- Music by: Francesco De Masi
- Production companies: Empire Films; Productions Jacques Roitfeld
- Release date: 1969
- Countries: Italy; France

Una storia d'amore is a 1969 Italian-French drama film directed by Michele Lupo, written by Antonio Leonviola, and starring soprano Anna Moffo and Gianni Macchia.

== Plot ==
Evy is a wealthy married woman and the mother of two children. While her husband Marco is away in Hong Kong on business, she meets Franz, a much younger playboy, and begins an affair with him. What initially appears to be a casual relationship gradually develops into love.

After Marco returns, Evy is unable to end the affair and attempts suicide. Franz eventually reveals that he habitually seduces women and secretly photographs them in compromising situations in order to blackmail them. He tells Evy the truth in an attempt to convince her that their relationship cannot continue. Evy ultimately ends the affair and returns to her husband.

== Cast ==
- Anna Moffo as Evy
- Gianni Macchia as Franz
- Jean Claudio as Marco, Evy's husband
- Alicia Brandet as Miss Elizabeth
- Claudie Lange as Ghita
- Beryl Cunningham as a dancer
- Gigi Ballista as lawyer Gino Borgognini
- Jacques Herlin as Rucò
- Caterina Boratto as Marco's mother
- Pupo De Luca as Paolo, the doctor
- Marcella Michelangeli
- Sandro Merli as a lay friar
- Ugo Adinolfi

== Production ==
The film was an Italian-French co-production between the Rome-based Empire Films and Productions Jacques Roitfeld of Paris. Antonio Leonviola wrote both the story and screenplay. Guglielmo Mancori was the cinematographer, Vincenzo Tomassi edited the film, Francesco De Masi composed the score, Nedo Azzini designed the sets, and Walter Patriarca designed the costumes.

The film received Italian censorship certificate no. 55235 on 31 December 1969.
