= Torpedo Bay (film) =

- Theatrical poster
- Directed by: Charles Frend; Bruno Vailati
- Written by: Adriano Belli; Pino Belli
- Produced by: Bruno Vailati
- Starring: James Mason; Lilli Palmer; Gabriele Ferzetti
- Cinematography: Gábor Pogány
- Edited by: Giancarlo Cappelli
- Distributed by: Galatea Film
- Release date: 30 June 1963 (France)
- Running time: 99 minutes
- Countries: Italy; France
- Language: English

Torpedo Bay is a 1963 war film directed by Charles Frend and Bruno Vailati and starring James Mason. The story is based on events that took place at Betasom, a submarine base established at Bordeaux by the Italian Navy during World War II.

The film was released as Beta Som, the Italian language acronym meaning Bordeaux Sommergibile. Phonetically B (for Bordeaux) is Beta and SOM is an abbreviation for 'Sommergibile' which is the Italian for submarine. In the United States, American International Pictures released it as a double feature with Commando in April 1964.

== Plot ==
An Italian submarine captain tries to navigate his sub through enemy waters whilst being stalked by a British commander. The Italian sub manages to make it into the neutral port of Tangiers, Morocco followed by the British commander. During their stay, the two captains agree not to fight. They come to respect each other. Eventually the Italian sub leaves port after the Captain accuses his lover of spying. The British commander follows, but ends up losing his ship to the Italian's torpedoes.

== Cast ==
- James Mason - Captain Blayne
- Gabriele Ferzetti - Leonardi
- Lilli Palmer - Lygia da Silva
- Alberto Lupo - Magri
- Valeria Fabrizi - Susanne
- Renato De Carmine - Ghedini
- Daniele Vargas - Brauzzi
- Andrew Keir - O'Brien
- Paul Muller - Police Commander
