= Alicia Brandet =

Italian-American actress and singer (1943–1984)

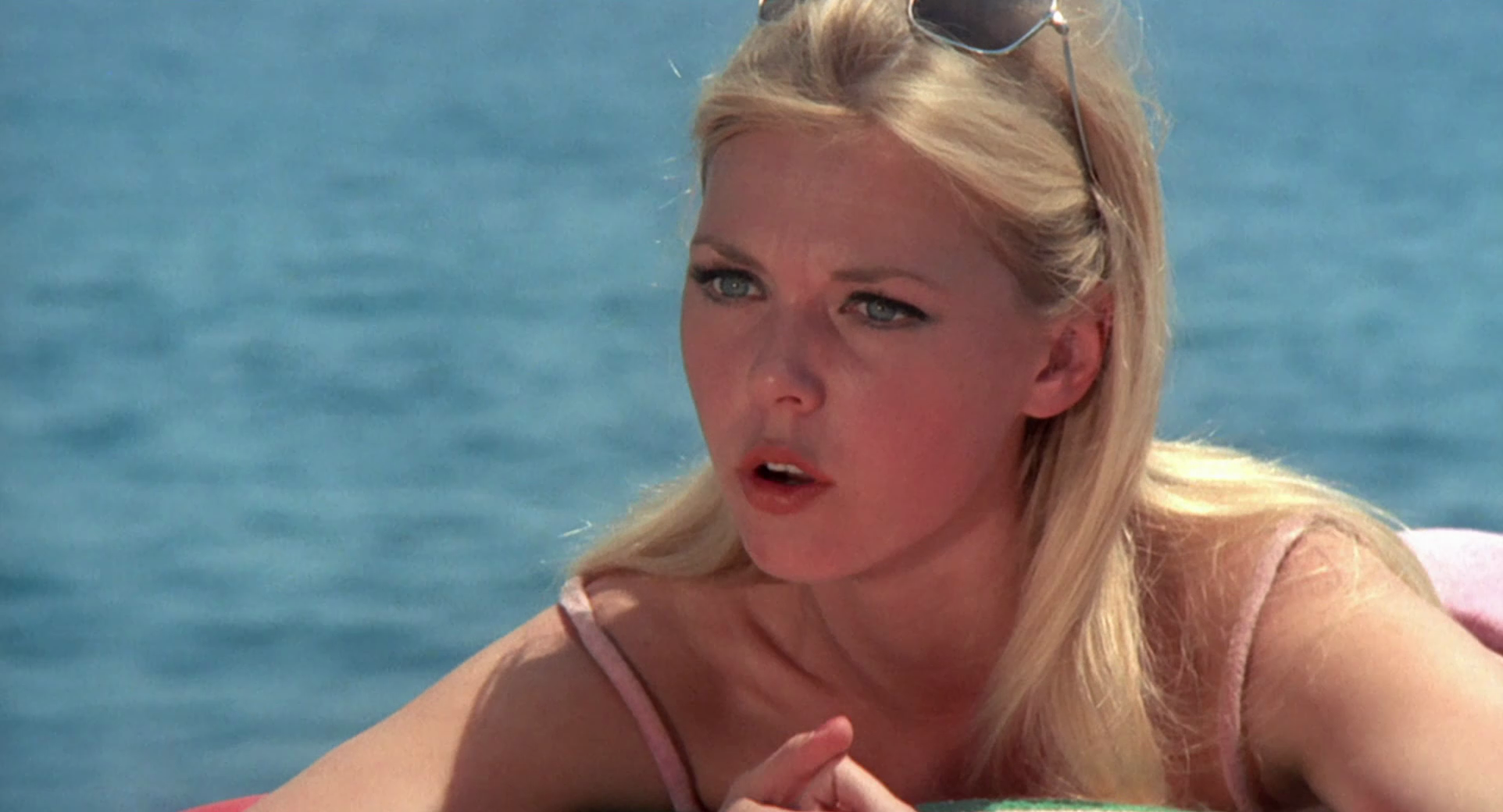
- Brandet in Zingara (1969)
- Born: Alicia Mowat; 1943 (age 82–83)
- Occupation: Actress
- Known for: The Christine Keeler Story (1963)

Alicia Brandet was an American actress known for her roles in commedia all'italiana films of the 1960s, including The Dolls (1965), Two Escape from Sing Sing (1964), and Weekend, Italian Style (1966). She is also known for her portrayal of Mandy Rice-Davies in The Christine Keeler Story (1963).

== Early life ==
Brandet was born Alicia Mowat on January 8, 1943, and grew up in West Los Angeles. Her parents were Donald Mowat and Norma (née Peterson) Mowat. Her father was a deputy city attorney in Van Nuys. As a teenager, she competed in beauty pageants, and won the titles of "Miss Venice Surfestival," "Miss Malibu," and "Miss Huntington Beach."

In October 1960, Brandet and her parents moved to Canoga Park, Los Angeles. She attended San Fernando Valley State College, where she studied theatre.

== Career ==
At the age of 19, while a student in college, Brandet travelled to Sweden. She reportedly ran out of money, and began working as a model and actress to fund her continued travels. While in Europe, she began using the professional name of Brandet, and appeared in several European films including The Christine Keeler Story, about the Profumo affair, in which she played Mandy Rice-Davies, starring alongside John Drew Barrymore and Yvonne Buckingham. She also appeared in six Italian films during this time, including Juliet of the Spirits by Federico Fellini, in which she had an uncredited role as a dancer.

Brandet appeared in several more Italian films throughout the 1960s, mainly in the commedia all'italiana genre. Her final role was in the 1969 film Una storia d'amore by Michele Lupo.

== Filmography ==
- The Christine Keeler Story (1963) as Mandy Rice-Davies
- I maniaci (1964) as Rosetta
- The Twelve-Handed Men of Mars (1964) as Frida
- What Ever Happened to Baby Toto (1964) as Inga
- Two Escape from Sing Sing (1964) as Ruth Allenby
- I ragazzi dell'hully-gully (1964)
- The Dolls (1965) as Armenia (segment: La telefonata)
- Latin Lovers (1965) as Ursula (segment: La grande conquista)
- How We Got Into Trouble With the Army (1965) as Catherine Swan
- Juliet of the Spirits (1965)
- Weekend, Italian Style (1965)
- Killer 77, Alive or Dead (1966) as Margaret 'Minnie' Duke
- Love Italian Style (1965) as Ethel
- The Seventh Floor (1967) as Gloria Inzerna
- Eat It (1969) as Dancer
- The Fourth Wall (1969) as Helen
- Zingara (1969) as Elizabeth McDonald
- Una storia d'amore (1969) as Miss Elizabeth
