= Valeria Fabrizi =

Italian actress and singer

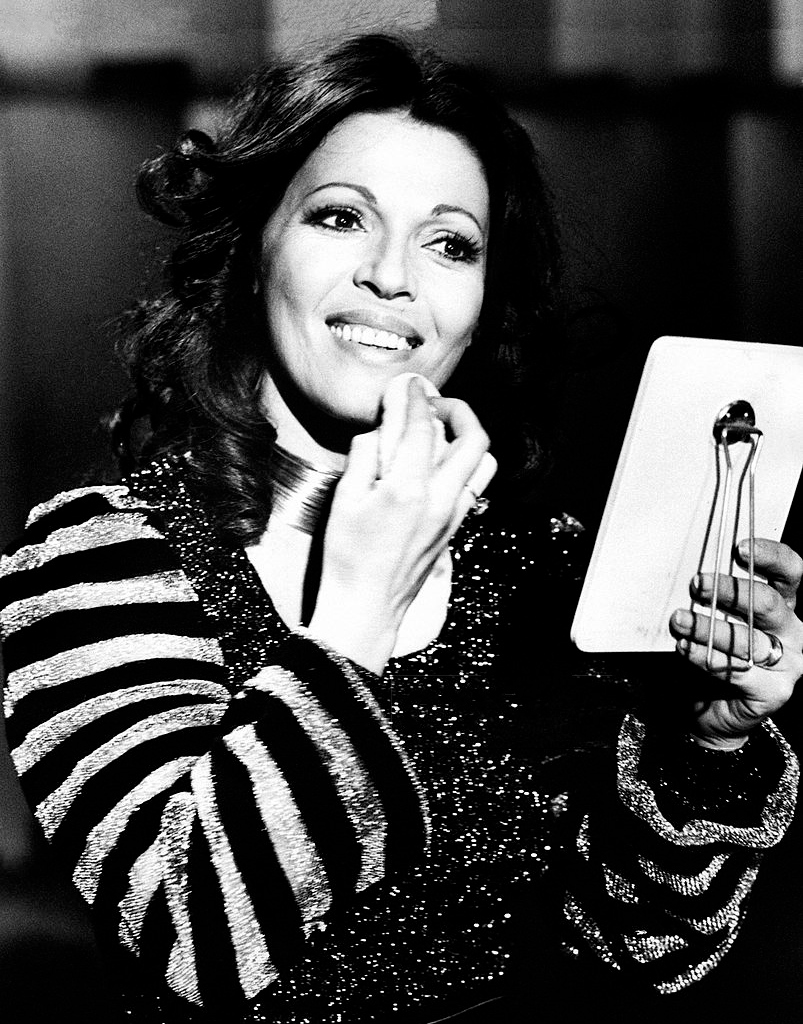
- Fabrizi in 1974
- Born: 20 October 1936 (age 89); Verona, Kingdom of Italy
- Occupations: Actress; singer; TV host
- Spouse: Tata Giacobetti (m. 1964; died 1988)
- Beauty pageant titleholder
- Title: Miss Italia 1957
- Major competitions: Miss Italia 1957 (Winner); Miss Universe 1957 (Top 15)

Valeria Fabrizi (born 20 October 1936) is an Italian actress, singer, TV host and beauty pageant titleholder who was crowned Miss Italia 1957.

== Life and career ==
Born in Verona, in 1936 Fabrizi made her acting debut in the revue Campione senza valore. The same year, she had her first leading role in the comedy play Carlo non farlo. she entered in Miss Universe 1957 where she placed Top 15 and appeared in the comedy play L'adorabile Giulio. After having been the soubrette of the 1959 musical Una storia in blue jeans she became the prima donna of the Erminio Macario's stage company. In 1964 Fabrizi married Tata Giacobetti, member of the group Quartetto Cetra, and started appearing in their television works. Fabrizi also has a film career of about thirty films, and she recorded several singles with EMI.

== Filmography ==
=== Films ===
Year	Title	Role(s)	Notes
1955	Girls of Today	Red-head woman	Cameo appearance
1955	Io piaccio	Theatre attender	Cameo appearance
1955	Beautiful but Dangerous	Silvana	
1955	Il falco d'oro	Waitress	Cameo appearance
1957	Mama's Boy	Wanda	
1957	Engaged to Death	Pretty woman	Cameo appearance
1958	Vento di primavera	Carla	
1959	Knight Without a Country	Countess of Holten	
1959	Le sorprese dell'amore	Mimma	
1959	La cento chilometri	Giuseppina	
1959	Un canto nel deserto	Jacqueline	
1960	Caccia al marito	Maresa Ferrari	
1960	Adua and Her Friends	Fosca	
1960	Ferragosto in bikini	Ainé	
1961	Akiko	Tosca	
1961	Walter e i suoi cugini	Claudia	
1961	Le magnifiche 7	Minou	
1961	Scandali al mare	Lolita	
1961	Un figlio d'oggi	Laura Raghi	
1961	Bellezze sulla spiaggia	Nurse Valeria	
1962	Il segugio	Morenita	
1962	Il medico delle donne	Beatrice	
1962	L'assassino si chiama Pompeo	Solange	
1962	Le massaggiatrici	Milena	
1963	Queste pazze, pazze donne	Carmelina	Segment: "Siciliani a Milano"
1963	Mathias Sandorf	Helene	
1963	Torpedo Bay	Susanne	
1963	Le motorizzate	Valeria	Segment: "La signora ci marcia"
1964	I marziani hanno 12 mani	Hotel waitress	Cameo appearance
1964	Le sette vipere	Claude	
1965	Questo pazzo, pazzo mondo della canzone	Aroldo's wife	
1965	Här kommer bärsärkarna	Elina	
1966	Delitto d'amore	Cristina	
1966	Ringo and His Golden Pistol	Margie	
1967	Soldati e capelloni	Concetta Sciortino	
1968	I due magnifici fresconi	Carmela	
1971	When Men Carried Clubs and Women Played Ding-Dong	Wife	
1971	Four Gunmen of the Holy Trinity	Adeline Martinez	
1973	Women in Cell Block 7	La Romana	
1975	Strip First, Then We Talk	Benita	
1975	Paolo Barca, Schoolteacher and Weekend Nudist	Mrs. Manzotti	
1975	Lover Boy	Celeste	
1975	Calore in provincia	Martha	
1976	Vai col liscio	Valeria	
1981	Chaste and Pure	Second wife	
1984	Windsurf - Il vento nelle mani	Car driver	Cameo appearance
1991	Caldo soffocante	Housekeeper	Cameo appearance
1994	Declarations of Love	Piera	
1999	Bagnomaria	Brunello's widow	Cameo appearance
2006	Notte prima degli esami	Adele	
2008	The Seed of Discord	Veronica's mother	
2017	Non c'è campo	Grandma	
2018	Dreamfools	Carmen	
2019	Se mi vuoi bene	Olivia	

=== Television ===
Year	Title	Role(s)	Notes
1959	Farse d'altri tempi	Marietta	Episode: "In pretura"
1963	La moglie di papà	Clara	Television film
1964	Biblioteca di Studio Uno	Margie / Bella	2 episodes
1967	TuttoTotò	Waitress	Episode: "Il grande maestro"
1968	Non cantare, spara	Pernice	Episode: "Settima puntata"
1970	Un certo Harry Brent	Sarah Miles	5 episodes
1973	Qui squadra mobile	Doris Scott	Episode: "Tutto di lei tranne il nome"
1978	The Nativity	Mado Fioresi	Television film
1981	Storia di Anna	Edvige	2 episodes
1991	I ragazzi del muretto	Gigi's mother	Episode: "Amori difficili"
1995	Voci notturne	Matilde Fiorenza	3 episodes
1996	Il maresciallo Rocca	Catherina Moghi	Episode: "Morte di una ragazza polacca"
1997	Un prete tra noi	Sandra Lancetti	Episode: "Per troppo amore"
1998	Linda e il brigadiere	Nietta	Episode: "Il fratello di Linda"
2000–2001	Sei forte, maestro	Lucina Nardi	52 episodes
2000	Il rumore dei ricordi	Matteo's mother	Television film
2005	Il bambino sull'acqua	Pina	Television film
2007–2008	Un posto al sole	Ginevra D'Ambrosio	9 episodes
2010	Tutti per Bruno	Enza	12 episodes
2011–present	Che Dio ci aiuti	Sister Costanza	132 episodes
2011	Don Matteo	Sister Costanza	Episode: "Don Matteo sotto accusa"
2013–2014	Un matrimonio	Rosalia Osti	6 episodes
2015–2017	Il paradiso delle signore	Countess Terrani	16 episodes
2020	Doc – Nelle tue mani	Tilde Ravelli	Episode: "L'errore"
