= Once a Year, Every Year =

- Directed by: Gianfrancesco Lazotti
- Written by: Cecilia Calvi; Gianfrancesco Lazotti
- Cinematography: Sebastiano Celeste
- Music by: Giovanni Venosta
- Release date: 1994
- Country: Italy
- Language: Italian

Once a Year, Every Year (Italian: Tutti gli anni una volta l'anno) is a 1994 Italian comedy film written and directed by Gianfrancesco Lazotti.

== Cast ==
- Giorgio Albertazzi as Lorenzo
- Paolo Bonacelli as Romano
- Lando Buzzanca asMario
- Paolo Ferrari as Francesco
- Paola Pitagora as Ginerva
- Giovanna Ralli as Laura
- Jean Rochefort as Raffaele
- Vittorio Gassman as Giuseppe
- Gianmarco Tognazzi as Davide
- Alexandra La Capria as Giulia
- Carla Cassola as Annamaria
- Mariangela Giordano
- Luigi Bonos
