= I due evasi di Sing Sing =

- Film poster
- Directed by: Lucio Fulci
- Written by: Marcello Ciorciolini; Lucio Fulci
- Produced by: Mega Film Turris Film
- Cinematography: Federico Zanni
- Music by: Ennio Morricone
- Release date: 1964
- Country: Italy
- Language: Italian

I due evasi di Sing Sing (lit. 'Two Escapees from Sing Sing') is a 1964 black-and-white Italian film directed by Lucio Fulci starring the comic duo Franco and Ciccio. The film is the first of three comedies with the duo by the same director, with I due pericoli pubblici and 00-2 agenti segretissimi, to be released in 1964.

== Plot ==
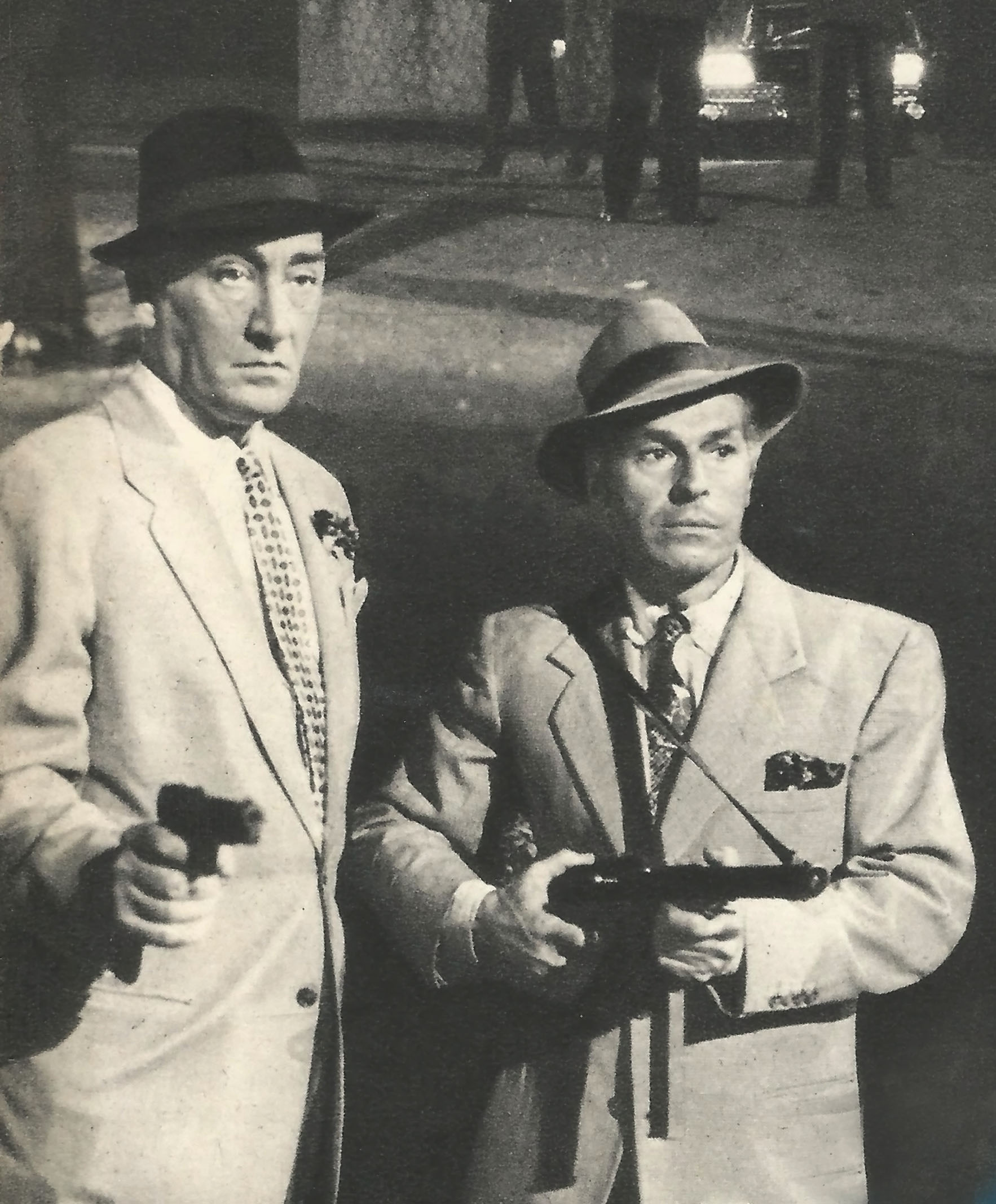
Dominici and Dottesio (film still)

In Sing Sing, cousins Franco and Ciccio Bacalone are about to be executed and are trying in vain to avoid the bitter fate that awaits them. The two are dragged into a room where two chairs initially mistaken for electric ones are placed, but in reality they only serve to tie the prisoners to prevent their escape. The cousins realize only after being tied up, that they will be executed with a cyanide pill placed under Franco's chair. Franco prevents the pill to diffuse its content. After he saves his life, Franco writes his memoirs and tells how he and Ciccio ended up in prison.

The flashback scenes show the two Italian immigrants (who arrived in the US as children) find work in a Turkish bath frequented by people linked to the underworld, including Attanasia, one of the most powerful bosses in New York, and Jarchin Enriquez known as the Scarred man. At this point the two cousins are involved in a firefight between the two rival gangs who, through their involuntary complicity, save their lives and that of Attanasia, who invites them to his villa to repay their debt.

Arrived in Attanasia's palace, the two realize the wealth and incredible power the latter has.The cousins naively ignore that Attanasia is a boss of the underworld and agree to work for him, Franco as a boxer and Ciccio as his cousin's "second".

Franco and Ciccio are unexpectedly entangled in the affairs of the boss, who manages to immerse himself in the world of boxing and comes into conflict with Lemmy Tristan, his enemy. Attanasia decides to fix all the matches to facilitate the cousins' journey to fight for the world title, while Tristan's attempt to kill Franco fails.

The two leaders reach an agreement; kill Franco in the last world title fight and split the betting loot. In the meantime, Franco and Ciccio learn of Attanasia's plans and try to escape, but are stopped by the latter's henchmen and forced to have to dispute the match with Frederick Jones, Tristan's trusted boxer. Thanks to a series of tragicomic events, the two cousins still manage to make fun of Jones, winning the world title and earning the hatred of Attanasia, who will find himself in a firefight with Tristan, the latter convinced he has been deceived. When the police arrive, the only two survivors are Franco and Ciccio who ask to speak only in the presence of a lawyer.

Accused of the massacre, the two will be sentenced to 99 years to be served in Sing Sing prison. Unfortunately for them, they end up in the cell where the Scarred man is kept, who ended up in prison because of them. Franco and Ciccio are forced to help him digging a tunnel to escape from prison. The first attempt fails and after a month of isolation, they still manage to escape thanks to the complicity of the nitroglycerin used by The Scarred man.

The two cousins seek help from Tony and Joe, Attanasia's henchmen, who took over command after his death, but will find themselves in the midst of yet another firefight and will be accused again and taken to prison. Franco and Ciccio, now resigned to their fate, will be informed by the director that Tony Agnello, before dying, had confessed their innocence, but the two, convinced of a bluff and for fear of being executed a second time, will refuse to open the cell, barricading themselves for 19 long years, before refusing a second time the freedom granted by the new director.

== Cast ==
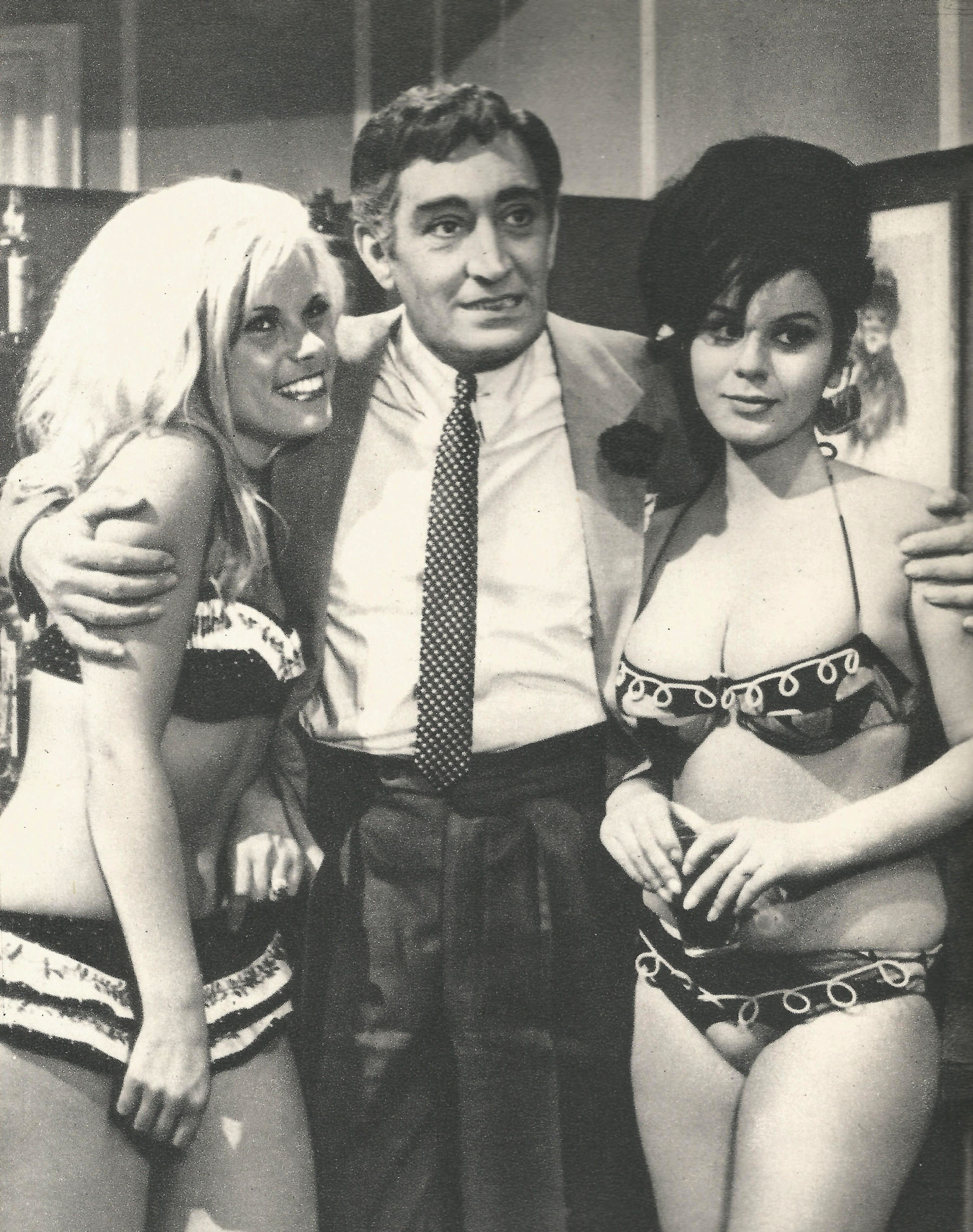
Dominici with two female characters (still from the film)

- Franco Franchi: Franco Bacalone
- Ciccio Ingrassia: Ciccio Bacalone
- Arturo Dominici: Alfred Attanasia
- Livio Lorenzon: Lemmy Tristan
- Poldo Bendandi: Jarchin Enriquez "Lo sfregiato"
- Attilio Dottesio: Tony Agnello
- Omero Gargano: Joe Pastrano
- Renato Terra: Jim Doris
- Gloria Paul: Molly Smith
- Alicia Brandet: Ruth Allenby
- Freddy Mack: Frederick Jones
- Vittorio Bonos: Prison director
- Nino Terzo: officer Thompson
- Mimmo Poli: Speaker
- Alfredo Rizzo: Turkish bath director
- Enzo Andronico: Henchman Attanasia
- Lino Banfi: Franco's friend

== Production ==
The film was written by Marcello Ciorciolini and Fulci himself. It is one of the 13 films directed by the latter that star the Sicilian comic duo of Franco and Ciccio, 3 being released in 1964, including I due evasi di Sing Sing.

The film was the first real role for Lino Banfi (he had made a brief credited appearance in another film by Fulci in 1960), and his first film with Franco and Ciccio, with whom he went on to become a regular sidekick for nearly a decade.

== Release ==
I due evasi di Sing Sing was distributed in Italy by Panta in August 1964. It was later released in West Germany and then France, in 1967.

== Soundtrack ==
I due evasi di Sing Sing later gained indirect fame thanks to its soundtrack by Ennio Morricone, which was commercially released as such only decades later. The score incorporates elements of jazz and bossa nova.

== Reception ==
Domestically the film was a major commercial success, grossing over 1 billion lire. An Italian contemporary review finds the film "lacking rhythm and at times boring."
