= Le sorprese dell'amore =

1959 film

- Directed by: Luigi Comencini
- Screenplay by: Edoardo Anton; Marcello Fondato
- Story by: Ruggero Maccari
- Produced by: Luigi Comencini
- Starring: Dorian Gray; Walter Chiari
- Cinematography: Carlo Carlini
- Edited by: Nino Baragli
- Music by: Gino Negri
- Release date: 1959
- Running time: 108 minutes
- Country: Italy
- Language: Italian

Le sorprese dell'amore ("Surprise of Love") is a 1959 Italian romantic comedy film written and directed by Luigi Comencini.

== Cast ==
- Dorian Gray as Didì
- Walter Chiari as Ferdinando
- Anna Maria Ferrero as Mariarosa
- Sylva Koscina as Marianna
- Franco Fabrizi as Battista
- Mario Carotenuto as Don Maurizio
- Elena Zareschi as Carlotta
- Vittorio Gassman as the schoolmaster
- Valeria Fabrizi as Mimma
- Carletto Sposito as Gaspare
- Memmo Carotenuto as the taxi driver
- Angela Luce
