= Dorian Gray (actress) =

Italian actress (1931–2011)

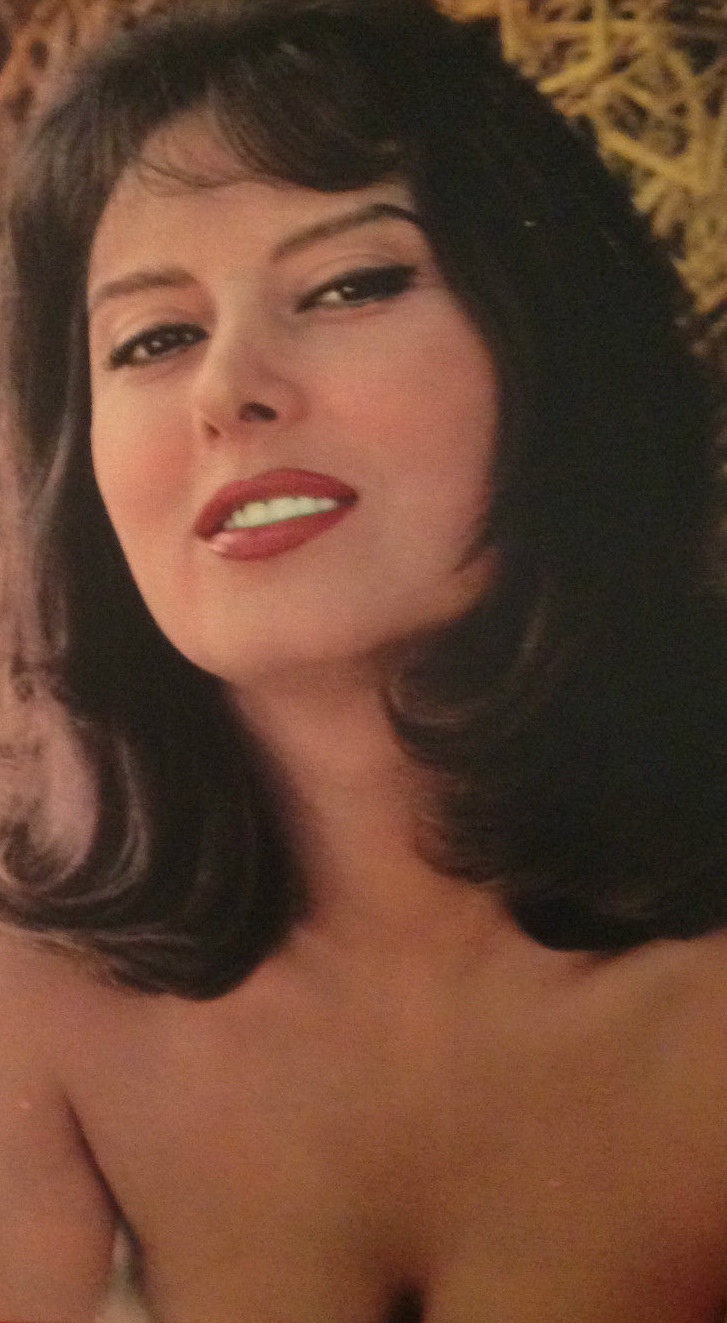
- Gray in 1958
- Born: Maria Luisa Mangini; 2 February 1931; Bolzano, Kingdom of Italy
- Died: 15 February 2011 (aged 80); Torcegno, Trentino, Italy
- Occupation: Actress
- Years active: 1951–1965

Dorian Gray (born Maria Luisa Mangini; 2 February 1931 – 15 February 2011) was an Italian actress.

== Biography ==
Gray made her stage debut in 1950. After five years she left the world of the theater and devoted herself to cinema.

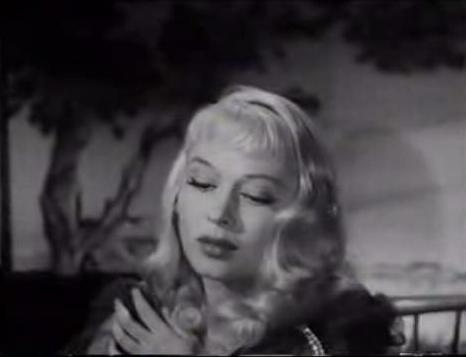
Dorian Gray in Totò, Peppino e la... malafemmina (1956)

The role she played most often in films was that of a seductive sexual character. She played the titular "bad girl" in Totò, Peppino e la... malafemmina. She also appeared in Michelangelo Antonioni's Il grido. In 1957, she took part in Nights of Cabiria by Federico Fellini.

== Death ==
On February 15, 2011, Gray committed suicide by gunshot at her home in Torcegno. She was 80 years old; some media, however, reported her age as 75, since she herself claimed to have been born in 1936.

== Partial filmography ==
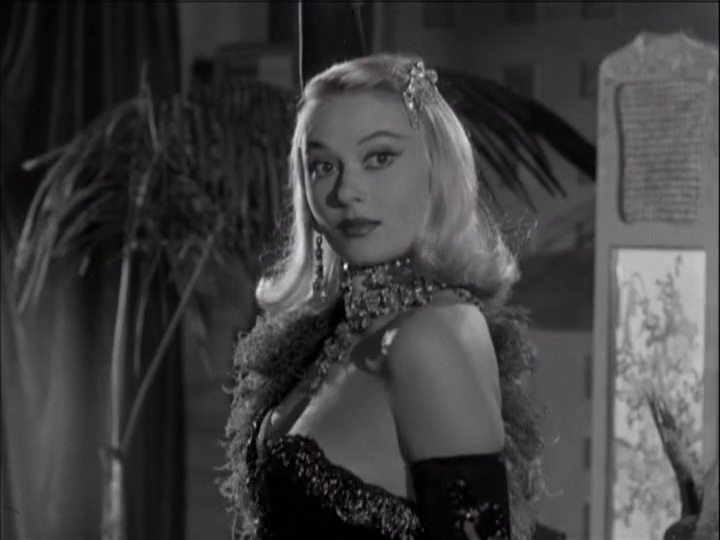
Gray in Io piaccio (1955)

- Accidenti alle tasse!! (1951) - Margot
- The Reluctant Magician (1951)
- Amo un assassino (1951) - Vandina
- Anema e core (1951) - Amica di Cocciaglia
- Sardinian Vendetta (1952) - Columba Porchiddu
- The Queen of Sheba (1952) - Ati
- Poppy (1952) - La guardarobiera
- Io piaccio (1955) - Doriana Paris
- Totò lascia o raddoppia? (1956) - Ellen
- Totò, Peppino e la malafemmina (1956) - Marisa Florian (the 'malafemmina')
- Guaglione (1956) - Nadia Lanti
- Totò, Peppino e i fuorilegge (1956) - Valeria
- Le notti di Cabiria (1957) - Jessy
- Il grido (1957) - Virginia
- Domenica è sempre domenica (1958) - Luciana
- Mogli pericolose (1958) - Ornella
- Racconti d'estate (1958) - Dorina
- Vacanze d'inverno (1959) - Carol Field
- Brevi amori a Palma di Majorca (1959) - Hélène
- Le sorprese dell'amore (1959) - Desdemona aka Didì
- Il Mattatore (1960) - Elena
- La regina delle Amazzoni (1960) - Antiope
- Crimen (1960) - Eleonora Franzetti
- Il carro armato dell'8 settembre (1960)
- Mani in alto (1961) - Pupina Micacci
- Gli attendenti (1961) - Lauretta
- The Constant Wife (1962) - Marie-Louise Jörgensen
- Peccati d'estate (1962) - Irene
- The Legion's Last Patrol (1962) - Nora
- Avventura al motel (1963)
- Thrilling (1965) - Veronique (segment "Sadik")
- I criminali della metropoli (1967) - Denise (final film role)
