= Toto, Peppino, and the Hussy =

Totò, Peppino e la malafemmina
- Directed by: Camillo Mastrocinque
- Written by: Nicola Manzari; Edoardo Anton; Sandro Continenza; Francesco Thellung
- Produced by: Isidoro Broggi; Renato Libassi
- Starring: Totò; Peppino De Filippo; Dorian Gray; Teddy Reno
- Cinematography: Mario Albertelli, Claudio Cirillo
- Edited by: Gisa Radicchi Levi
- Music by: Pippo Barzizza; Lelio Luttazzi; Totò
- Production company: D.D.L.
- Release date: 1956
- Running time: 102 minutes
- Country: Italy
- Language: Italian
- Box office: 1,751,000,000 Italian lire

Toto, Peppino, and the Hussy (originally Totò, Peppino e la... malafemmina) is an Italian comedy film directed by Camillo Mastrocinque in 1956. It stars the comedy duo of Totò and Peppino De Filippo. The film also stars the popular singer Teddy Reno, and features Reno singing some of his songs as well as "Malafemmena", Totò's most famous work as a songwriter.

It was the top-grossing movie of the year in Italy with a 1,751,000,000 Italian lire revenue (about 40 million euro in 2009).

== Plot ==
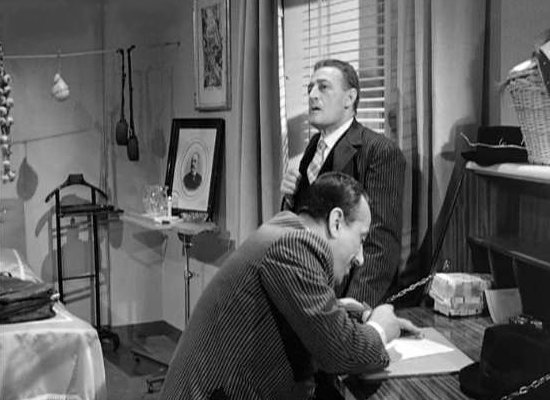
Totò and Peppino De Filippo in a scene of the film

The brothers Antonio (Totò) and Peppino (Peppino De Filippo) Caponi are boorish landowners living in southern Italy. Antonio is lavish and steals his stingy brother's money. Gianni (Teddy Reno), their sister Lucia (Vittoria Crispo)'s son, is studying medicine in Naples, when he falls in love with Marisa (Dorian Gray), a revue dancer, and follows her to Milan.

The news is broken to the family with an anonymous letter, and the three brothers travel to Milan in an attempt to stop the relationship, which they consider dangerous. Antonio and Peppino try to bribe Marisa away from Gianni but he woos her back by moving her to tears with the song "Malafemmina", and Lucia realizes that she is a good girl. In the end, she leaves the revue world, moves to their village and marries Gianni.

== The letter of the Capone brothers ==
Memorable in the history of comedy films is the scene in the movie where Toto and Peppino (the Capone brothers) have to write a simple letter to be sent to their nephew. Unfortunately for two uneducated peasants even this simple task proves impossible. Everything that the two brothers should write to their nephew's girlfriend concerns a notice to let the boy alone in order for him to continue his studies. Mistaking her for roughly a prostitute, however, the two brothers offer the girl 700,000 as a reward.
Yet Toto, who is believed to be the bright one, dictates a letter to his brother that is so full of grammatical and syntactical errors to make it unintelligible.
The text of the letter says:

« Signorina veniamo noi con questa mia addirvi una parola che che che scusate se sono poche ma sette cento mila lire; noi ci fanno specie che questanno c’è stato una grande morìa delle vacche come voi ben sapete.: questa moneta servono a che voi vi con l'insalata consolate dai dispiacere che avreta perché dovete lasciare nostro nipote che gli zii che siamo noi medesimo di persona vi mandano questo [la scatola con i soldi] perché il giovanotto è studente che studia che si deve prendere una laura che deve tenere la testa al solito posto cioè sul collo.;.; Salutandovi indistintamente i fratelli Caponi (che siamo noi i Fratelli Caponi) »

== Legacy ==
Some of the most famous scenes of Totò and Peppino took place in this movie (e.g. the dictation of a letter full of grammatical errors and their attempt to talk in French with a Milanese policeman ("nous voulevan savua'...")).

== Cast ==
- Totò: Antonio Caponi
- Peppino De Filippo: Peppino Caponi
- Dorian Gray: Marisa Florian
- Teddy Reno: Gianni
- Vittoria Crispo: Lucia Caponi
- Mario Castellani: Mezzacapa
- Nino Manfredi: Raffaele
- Luisa Ciampi: Giulietta
- Edoardo Toniolo: Remo
- Linda Sini: Gabriella
