= Commando (1962 film) =

1962 film directed by Frank Wisbar

Marcia o Crepa
- US release film poster
- Directed by: Frank Wisbar
- Written by: William Denby; Mino Guerrini; Milton Krims; Giuseppe Mangione; Frank Wisbar; Arturo Tofanelli (story)
- Produced by: Willy Zeyn
- Starring: Stewart Granger; Dorian Gray
- Cinematography: Cecilio Paniagua
- Edited by: Mario Serandrei
- Music by: Angelo Francesco Lavagnino
- Production companies: Temp Film; FICIT; Galatea; Midega
- Distributed by: Tempo Film (Italy); American International Pictures (USA)
- Release dates: 1962 (Italy); 1963 (UK); 1964 (France, U.S.)
- Running time: 101 minutes
- Countries: Belgium; Spain; Italy; Germany
- Language: English
- Box office: 977,460 admissions (France)

Marcia o Crepa (March or Die), known as The Legion's Last Patrol in the UK and Commando in the US, is a 1962 European (Italian, German, Spanish) co-production war film about the Algerian War of Independence.

It was released in 1964 in the US by American International Pictures on a double feature with Torpedo Bay (aka Beta Som).

In the UK this film was shown at Odeon cinemas as part of a double feature with The Day of the Triffids.

== Plot ==
French Foreign Legion Captain Le Blanc (Stewart Granger) leads a section of his Legion parachutists to capture an FLN guerrilla leader. Along the way they are joined by a prostitute (Dorian Gray) and an Arab child. Their mission is a success but when their escape helicopter is shot down they have to fight their way back to the French lines.

== Cast ==
- Stewart Granger : capitaine Leblanc
- Dorian Gray : Nora
- Fausto Tozzi : Brascia
- Riccardo Garrone : Paolo
- Carlos Casaravilla : Ben Bled
- Ivo Garrani : Colonel Dionne
- Alfredo Mayo : Mayor
- Pablito Alonso : Arab Kid
- Hans von Borsody : Fritz
- Maurizio Arena : Dolce Vita
- Dietmar Schönherr : Petit Prince
- Peter Carsten : Barbarossa
- Leo Anchóriz : Garcia

== Musical score ==
The theme music Concerto Disperato by Angelo Francesco Lavagnino became a top selling instrumental in Italy performed by Nini Rosso and in the UK with a cover version by Ken Thorne reaching No. 4.

== Reception ==
The Los Angeles Times called it "mediocre, its timely subject matter reduced to the level of a formula Western."

The Monthly Film Bulletin said "despite up-to-date dressing this is basically a schoolboy adventure story, though somewhat grimly executed... the narrative owes more to war movies than P.C. Wren, being a variation on the old idea of the gradual decimation of a patrol. Still, the film is an example of action all the way, apart from the gratuitously ironic ending which, though tart, comes as a decided anti-climax."

== See also ==
- Algerian War
