= Alberto Castagna =

Italian television presenter and journalist

- Castagna from the cover of Chi magazine, in 2005
- Born: Alberto Castagna; December 23, 1945; Castiglion Fiorentino, Kingdom of Italy
- Died: March 1, 2005 (aged 59); Rome, Italy
- Occupations: Television presenter; journalist
- Years active: 1982–2005
- Height: 1.75 m (5 ft 9 in)
- Spouse: Maria Concetta Romano (m. 1994–1995)
- Partner: Francesca Rettondini (1995–2000)
- Children: Carolina (born 1992)

Alberto Castagna (December 23, 1945 – March 1, 2005) was an Italian television presenter and journalist.

== Biography ==
Alberto Castagna started working as a journalist for the newspapers Il Piccolo and Settimanale. In 1982, he debuted on TV in the Rai 2 news program TG2, initially as a reporter and then as a correspondent. In 1988, he collaborated with Pippo Baudo for one edition of the primetime show Serata d'onore and then hosted the morning shows Mattina 2 and, in 1992, I fatti vostri, both directed by Michele Guardì.

After winning a Telegatto as "personaggio maschile dell'anno", in 1993 he left RAI network switching to Fininvest, where he hosted the afternoon quiz Sarà vero?, aired by Canale 5. In 1994 he started hosting the primetime show Stranamore, one of the most important TV shows in the 1990s, the talk show Complotto di famiglia and the summer primetime entertainment show Cuori e denari, with Antonella Elia and Simona Ventura.

In 1995/1996, Alberto Castagna presented the Canale 5 afternoon show Casa Castagna, directed by Gianni Boncompagni In 1996 he was interrupted by "Ordine dei giornalisti" because of a violation of the rules about children on TV during an episode of Stranamore. The year after has been radiated for repeating the same violation. It was reinstated in the "Ordine dei giornalisti" in 1999, after ricoursing.

In 1998 Alberto had a role as actor in the Rete 4's fiction La villa dei misteri. In the same year he suffered a double aneurysm; because of this he stayed in the hospital from July 18, 1998, to March 1999, attracting the attention of the Italian media because of his critical state of health. Despite everything, he had to undergo dialysis and wait for a kidney transplant. In 1999 he also released for Arnoldo Mondadori Editore the biographical book La mano sul cuore.

He came back on TV with his most important show, Stranamore, in April 2001, aired by Canale 5 on Sundays. In the following years he continued presenting this show, having quite success and being moved to Retequattro in 2004. In that same year, Alberto hosted another primetime show for Retequattro, Cosa non farei.

In February 2005, Alberto Castagna started presenting a new edition of Stranamore, with Emanuela Folliero, but it was never completed because of his death, which occurred on 1 March 2005 due to an internal bleeding. The news of his death was announced on live television by Paolo Bonolis during the 2005 edition of Festival di Sanremo, the most important music festival in Italy.

In his life he was married with Maria Concetta "Pucci" Romano, from whom he had the daughter Carolina (1992), from 1994 to 1995.

== Television ==
- Serata d'onore (Rai 2, 1988)
- Mattina 2 (Rai 2, 1988 – 1992)
- I fatti vostri (Rai 2, 1992 – 1993)
- Sarà vero? (Canale 5, 1993 – 1994)
- Stranamore (Canale 5, Rete 4, 1994–1998, 2001–2005)
- Complotto di famiglia (Canale 5, 1994 – 1995)
- Cuori e denari (Canale 5, 1995)
- Casa Castagna (Canale 5, 1995 – 1996)
- Cosa non farei (Rete 4, 2004)
