= Lelio Luttazzi =

Italian musician and television/radio presenter (1923–2010)

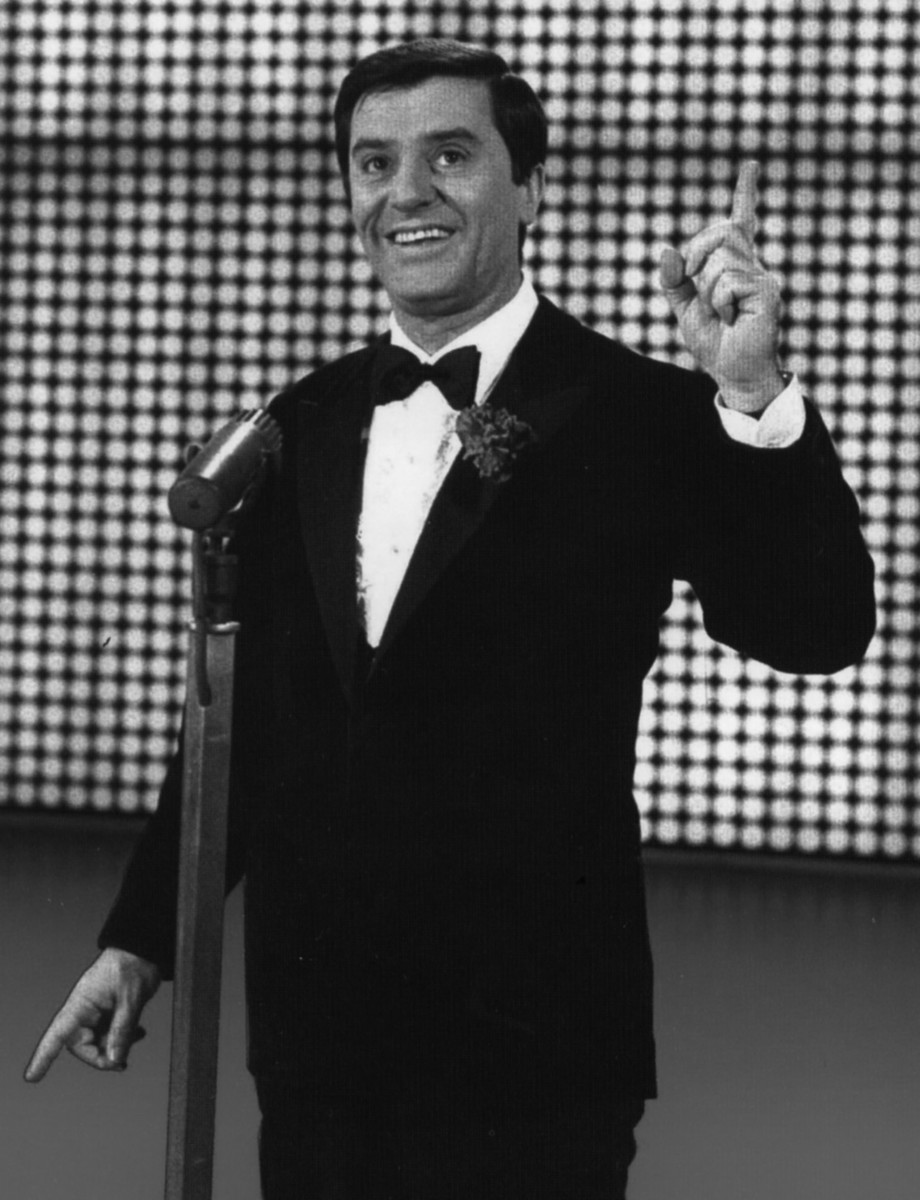
Luttazzi on Studio Uno, 1965–66

Lelio Luttazzi (27 April 1923 – 8 July 2010) was an Italian composer, musician, actor, singer, conductor, writer, and television and radio presenter.

Born in Trieste, Luttazzi began playing the piano at Radio Trieste and composing his first songs when he was student in law at the University of Trieste during the Second World War. After the war, he had from SIAE a gain of 350,000 lire, a considerable sum for the time, so he decided to become a full-time composer and in 1948 he moved to Milan where he began working with fellow Teddy Reno at the record company CGD. He was among the first composers to place jazz structures in the Italian songs.

A multifaceted artist, he worked in revues and cinema as actor and composer of soundtracks. He was also a successful television and radio presenter, reaching the peak of his popularity with the radio program Hit parade, one of the longest radio programs broadcast in Italy. In the early 1970s Luttazzi was involved together with Walter Chiari in drug dealing; Luttazzi went to prison for a month before being acquitted due to lack of evidence. From then on, he became semi-retired, leading a reserved life and rarely returning to the spotlight.

== Selected filmography ==
Composer
- The Two Sergeants (1951)
- Miracle in Viggiù (1951)
- Toto, Peppino, and the Hussy (1956)
- Peppino, le modelle e chella là (1957)
- Souvenir d'Italie (1957)
- Venice, the Moon and You (1958)
- Adorabili e bugiarde (1958)
- Legs of Gold (1958)
- Assignment: Outer Space (1960)
- The Passionate Thief (1960)
- Weekend, Italian Style (1965)
- Di che segno sei? (1975)
- The Con Artists (1976)
- La presidentessa (1977)
- Maschio latino cercasi (1977)
Actor
- Sua Altezza ha detto: no! (1953) - Sandro
- Motivo in maschera (1955) - Lelio, il musicista
- L'Avventura (1960) - Raimondo
- The Orderly (1961) - Tenente Marchetti
- The Visit (1964) - 1st Idler
- Weekend, Italian Style (1965) - Rastrelli (segment "La moglie bionda") (uncredited)
- Kiss the Other Sheik (1965) - Count Antonio Bellanca
- I complessi (1965) - Himself (segment "Guglielmo il Dentone")
- Me, Me, Me... and the Others (1966) - Director
- Mi vedrai tornare (1966) - Conte Aleardi
- Snow Job (1972) - Bank Manager
