= Weekend, Italian Style =

1965 film by Dino Risi

- Theatrical release poster
- Italian: L'ombrellone
- Directed by: Dino Risi
- Written by: Ennio De Concini; Dino Risi
- Produced by: Mario Cecchi Gori
- Starring: Enrico M. Salerno; Sandra Milo; Daniela Bianchi; Trini Alonso; Alicia Brandet; Pepe Calvo; Lelio Luttazzi; Raffaele Pisu; Leopoldo Trieste; Véronique Vendell; Jean Sorel
- Cinematography: Armando Nannuzzi
- Edited by: Franco Fraticelli; Emilio Rodríguez (uncredited)
- Music by: Lelio Luttazzi
- Production companies: Ultra Film; Les Films du Siècle; Altura Films
- Distributed by: Interfilm (Italy); Prodis (France)
- Release dates: 28 December 1965 (Italy); 6 February 1967 (Spain); 1 March 1967 (France)
- Running time: 103 minutes
- Countries: Italy; France; Spain
- Language: Italian

Weekend, Italian Style (Italian: L'ombrellone, lit. 'The Beach Umbrella') is a 1965 comedy film co-written and directed by Dino Risi.

== Plot ==
During the Ferragosto national holiday, Enrico Marletti, a middle-aged Roman engineer who hates crowds and would prefer some peace and quiet, joins his wife Giuliana for the weekend in the overcrowded seaside resort of Riccione, where she has been vacationing for three weeks. Upon arrival, Enrico meets a group of wealthy, loud and gossipy people that Giuliana has befriended during her vacation.

Noticing that Giuliana has been distressed, Enrico begins to suspect that his wife is having an affair. When a handsome young man outside their hotel calls out Giuliana's name, Enrico follows the man, who introduces himself as Sergio and explains that he is part of a group of gigolos who provide companionship to female tourists, including married women. Enrico finds that Sergio is seeing a different, younger woman named Giuliana.

Enrico also notices Giuliana growing close to the penniless Count Antonio Bellanca, an auctioneer who encourages her to read books by poets such as Pablo Neruda and Dylan Thomas. After a stroll with Enrico along the seafront, Giuliana ends her liaison with Bellanca and cancels an order for an 18th-century piece of furniture. That night, Enrico engages Bellanca in a poker game and wins 240,000 lire by bluffing, thus recouping his vacation money.

The next morning, Enrico kisses Giuliana goodbye as he prepares to drive back to Rome. Before Enrico departs, Sergio assures him that Giuliana will be off-limits to his fellow gigolos. Back in Rome, Enrico catches up on his sleep, having had trouble sleeping in Riccione.

== Cast ==
- Enrico Maria Salerno as Enrico Marletti
- Sandra Milo as Giuliana Marletti
- Daniela Bianchi as Isabella Dominici
- Trini Alonso as Clelia Valdameri
- Alicia Brandet as Ingrid
- Pepe Calvo as Commander Tagliaferri
- Lelio Luttazzi as Count Antonio Bellanca
- Raffaele Pisu as Pasqualino
- Leopoldo Trieste as Professor Ferri
- Véronique Vendell as Giuliana
- Jean Sorel as Sergio
- Antonella Della Porta as Mrs. De Rossi
- Helga Liné as Pucci
- Solvi Stubing as Mrs. Marini (uncredited)
