= Valeria medico legale =

- Country of origin: Italy
- No. of seasons: 2
- No. of episodes: 21

Original release
- Network: Canale 5
- Release: 2000 – 2002

Valeria medico legale is an Italian crime television series.

== Cast ==
- Claudia Koll: Valeria Banzi
- Giulio Base: Luca Leoni
- Nando Gazzolo
- Massimo Ciavarro
- Blas Roca Rey
- Camilla Filippi
- Francesca Rettondini (season 2)
- Isa Barzizza (season 2)
- Marino Masè (season 2)

== See also ==
- List of Italian television series
