= Lino Banfi =

Italian actor (born 1936)

- Banfi in 2026
- Born: Pasquale Zagaria; 9 July 1936 (age 90); Andria, Kingdom of Italy
- Occupations: Actor; screenwriter
- Years active: 1960–present
- Spouse: Lucia Lagrasta (m. 1962; died 2023)
- Children: 2, including Rosanna

Pasquale Zagaria Knight Grand Cross OMRI (born July 9, 1936), known professionally as Lino Banfi, is an Italian actor and screenwriter. Since 1960 he has appeared in more than 100 films.

== Biography ==
Banfi was born in the Apulian city of Andria, and at the age of three he moved to Canosa di Puglia. He started his career as a local singer and as a fotoromanzi actor. In 1954, determined to realize his aspiration to be an actor, he moved to Milan, where he encountered great economic and work difficulties, before moving to Rome in 1957, where he eventually started his professional stage career. Initially performing as Lino Zaga, he was part of numerous avanspettacolo companies, including those led by Alberto Sorrentino and Beniamino Maggio.

Banfi made his film debut playing a minor role in Lucio Fulci's Howlers in the Dock. On the set of Fulci's Two Escape from Sing Sing he befriended the comedy duo Franco and Ciccio, and for several years he became a regular character actor in their films. In 1968, he embraced stand-up comedy, replacing Enrico Montesano at the Lando Fiorini's cabaret club Puff.

Lino Banfi became one of the most well-known actors in Italian "sexy comedies" in the 1970s. In the 1980s he reached the peak of his fame by appearing in movies such as L'allenatore nel pallone, Vieni avanti cretino, Il commissario Lo Gatto and Occhio, malocchio, prezzemolo e finocchio; he later portrayed Grandpa Libero in Italian TV series Un medico in famiglia.

During his career, nearly all of Lino Banfi's characters spoke with the distinctive pronunciation of the Bari dialect. Banfi and his wife Lucia Lagrasta were married since 1962 until her death in February 2023; they have two children: Walter and Rosanna, who is also an actress. In 2000, Lino Banfi became a Goodwill ambassador for the Italian National Committee for UNICEF.

== Filmography ==
=== Film ===
Year	Film	Role	Director
1960	Urlatori alla sbarra		Lucio Fulci
1964	I due evasi di Sing Sing		Lucio Fulci
1964	Sedotti e bidonati	Cousin Pasquale	Giorgio Bianchi
1965	Goldginger		Giorgio Simonelli
1965	The Two Parachutists		Lucio Fulci
1965	Come inguaiammo l'esercito		Lucio Fulci
1965	002 Operazione Luna		Lucio Fulci
1966	I due parà		Lucio Fulci
1966	War Italian Style	German Soldier	Luigi Scattini
1966	Adulterio all'italiana	Marco	Pasquale Festa Campanile
1967	A suon di lupara		Luigi Petrini
1968	I due pompieri		Bruno Corbucci
1968	The Nephews of Zorro		Marcello Ciorciolini
1968	I due deputati		Giovanni Grimaldi
1969	Zum zum zum - La canzone che mi passa per la testa		Bruno Corbucci
1969	Zum zum zum n° 2		Bruno Corbucci
1969	Indovina chi viene a merenda?		Marcello Ciorciolini
1969	Lisa dagli occhi blu		Bruno Corbucci
1969	Gli infermieri della mutua		Giuseppe Orlandini
1969	Oh dolci baci e languide carezze		Mino Guerrini
1969	Paths of War		Aldo Grimaldi
1969	Diary of a Telephone Operator		Marcello Fondato
1969	Il Prof. Dott. Guido Tersilli, primario della clinica Villa Celeste, convenzionata con le mutue		Luciano Salce
1969	Quelli belli... siamo noi		Giorgio Mariuzzo
1970	Don Franco e Don Ciccio nell'anno della contestazione		Marino Girolami
1970	Nel giorno del Signore		Bruno Corbucci
1970	Mezzanotte d'amore		Ettore Maria Fizzarotti
1970	Io non scappo... fuggo		Franco Prosperi
1970	Amore Formula 2		Mario Amendola
1970	Ninì Tirabusciò la donna che inventò la mossa		Marcello Fondato
1971	Mazzabubù... Quante corna stanno quaggiù?		Mariano Laurenti
1971	In Prison Awaiting Trial		Nanni Loy
1971	Il clan dei due Borsalini		Giuseppe Orlandini
1971	Scusi, ma lei le paga le tasse?		Mino Guerrini
1971	Io non spezzo... rompo		Bruno Corbucci
1971	Il furto è l'anima del commercio...?!		Bruno Corbucci
1971	Venga a fare il soldato da noi		Ettore Maria Fizzarotti
1971	Riuscirà l'avvocato Franco Benenato a sconfiggere il suo acerrimo nemico il pretore Ciccio De Ingras?		Mino Guerrini
1972	Il terrore con gli occhi storti		Steno
1972	Continuavano a chiamarli i due piloti più matti del mondo		Mariano Laurenti
1972	Boccaccio		Bruno Corbucci
1972	The Mighty Anselmo and His Squire		Bruno Corbucci
1973	Il brigadiere Pasquale Zagaria ama la mamma e la polizia		Luca Davan
1973	Lovers and Other Relatives		Salvatore Samperi
1973	The Funny Face of the Godfather		Franco Prosperi
1974	4 marmittoni alle grandi manovre		Franco Martinelli
1974	Il trafficone		Bruno Corbucci
1974	Sesso in testa		Sergio Ammirata
1975	The Exorcist: Italian Style		Ciccio Ingrassia
1975	Loaded Guns		Fernando Di Leo
1976	Stangata in famiglia		Franco Nucci
1976	L'affittacamere		Mariano Laurenti
1976	Basta che non si sappia in giro		Luigi Magni
1977	La compagna di banco		Mariano Laurenti
1977	Orazi e Curiazi 3 - 2		Sergio Ammirata
1977	Kakkientruppen		Marino Girolami
1978	L'insegnante balla... con tutta la classe		Giuliano Carnimeo
1978	The Schoolteacher Goes to Boys' High		Mariano Laurenti
1978	La liceale nella classe dei ripetenti		Mariano Laurenti
1978	The Soldier with Great Maneuvers		Nando Cicero
1979	L'insegnante al mare con tutta la classe		Michele Massimo Tarantini
1979	Night Nurse		Mariano Laurenti
1979	Saturday, Sunday and Friday		Sergio Martino
1979	La liceale, il diavolo e l'acquasanta		Nando Cicero
1979	Tutti a squola		Pier Francesco Pingitore
1979	How to Seduce Your Teacher		Mariano Laurenti
1979	A Policewoman on the Porno Squad		Michele Massimo Tarantini
1979	The School Teacher in the House		Michele Massimo Tarantini
1979	The Nurse in the Military Madhouse		Mariano Laurenti
1980	La ripetente fa l'occhietto al preside		Mariano Laurenti
1980	La moglie in vacanza... l'amante in città		Sergio Martino
1980	La moglie in bianco... l'amante al pepe		Michele Massimo Tarantini
1980	Sugar, Honey and Pepper		Sergio Martino
1980	La dottoressa ci sta col colonnello		Michele Massimo Tarantini
1981	Spaghetti a mezzanotte		Sergio Martino
1981	L'onorevole con l'amante sotto il letto		Mariano Laurenti
1981	Cornetti alla crema		Sergio Martino
1981	Fracchia la belva umana		Neri Parenti
1982	Vieni avanti cretino		Luciano Salce
1982	Dio li fa e poi li accoppia		Steno
1982	Pappa e ciccia		Neri Parenti
1982	Vai avanti tu che mi vien da ridere		Giorgio Capitani
1982	Don't Play with Tigers		Sergio Martino
1983	Al bar dello sport		Francesco Massaro
1983	Occhio, malocchio, prezzemolo e finocchio		Sergio Martino
1984	L'allenatore nel pallone		Sergio Martino
1985	I pompieri		Neri Parenti
1986	Grandi magazzini		Castellano & Pipolo
1986	Scuola di ladri		Neri Parenti
1986	Il commissario Lo Gatto		Dino Risi
1987	Roba da ricchi		Sergio Corbucci
1987	Missione eroica - I pompieri 2		Giorgio Capitani
1987	Bellifreschi		Enrico Oldoini
1988	Com'è dura l'avventura		Flavio Mogherini
2008	L'allenatore nel pallone 2		Sergio Martino
2008	Un'estate al mare		Carlo Vanzina
2009	Focaccia blues		Nico Cirasola
2009	Wedding Fever in Campobello		Neele Vollmar
2012	Buona giornata		Carlo Vanzina
2015	Le frise ignoranti		Antonello De Leo
2016	Quo vado?		Gennaro Nunziante
2022	Vecchie canaglie		Chiara Sani
2022	Surprise Trip		Roberto Baeli
2025	Oi vita mia		Pio e Amedeo

=== TV ===
- Il giornalino di Gian Burrasca (1964)
- Il triangolo rosso (1969)
- Arrivano i mostri (1977)
- Il superspia (1977)
- Se Parigi... (1982)
- Il vigile urbano (1989, Rai 1)
- Aspettando Sanremo (1990, Rai 1)
- Un inviato molto speciale (1992, Rai 2)
- Nuda proprietà vendesi (1997, Rai 1)
- Vola Sciusciù (2000, Rai 1 - subject also)
- Piovuto dal cielo (2000, Rai 1)
- Angelo il custode (2001, Rai 1)
- Un difetto di famiglia (2002, Rai 1)
- Il destino ha 4 zampe (2002, Rai 1)
- Un posto tranquillo (2003, Rai 1)
- Raccontami una storia (2004, Rai 1)
- Un posto tranquillo 2 (2005, Rai 1)
- Il mio amico Babbo Natale (2005, Canale 5)
- Il padre delle spose (2006, Rai 1)
- Il mio amico Babbo Natale 2 (2006, Canale 5)
- Scusate il disturbo (2009, Rai 1)
- Un medico in famiglia (1998–2016, Rai 1)
- Tutti i padri di Maria (2010, Rai 1)
- Il commissario Zagaria (2011, Canale 5)

== Books ==
- Alla grande! (1991)
- Una parola è troppa... Nonno Libero racconta (2004)
- C'era una volta Nonno Libero (2004)
- Ti racconto una storia. Ricordi di vita e di scena (2006)
- Il chèlcio (Note: Chèlcio stands for calcio ('football' or 'soccer') pronounced with a heavy Bari accent.) secondo Oronzo Canà (2009)

== Honours ==
- Italy: Knight Grand Cross of the Order of Merit of the Italian Republic (27 December 1998)
