= Francesca Rettondini =

Italian actress and television presenter

- Born: 7 March 1971 (age 55); Verona, Italy
- Years active: 1989-present
- Known for: Actress, Producer
- Notable work: Ghost Ship
- Height: 168 cm (5 ft 6 in)
- Partner: Alberto Castagna (1995–2000)

Francesca Rettondini (born 7 March 1968) is an Italian actress and television presenter. She is internationally known for the role of a songstress by the name of Francesca in the 2002 film Ghost Ship.

== Career ==
Francesca Rettondini made her television debut in 1993 on the Italian soap opera Passions. In 1995, she was cast in the miniseries Crazy Family. That same year, she made her film debut in the Jerry Calà film, Boys of the Night.

In 2002 she was in the main cast of the Dark Castle horror movie Ghost Ship as the songstress Francesca; the movie had international success on the American market. Meanwhile she continued her television career with the historical series Elisa Di Rivombrosa. In 2005 she participated in the movie il demone del tempo.

Since 2020 she started and produced several Italian productions, most recently the movie unna preighera per giuda, with the American actor Danny Trejo.

== Costa Concordia disaster ==
In January 2012, Rettondini was aboard the Costa Concordia, filming a reality competition television series called Professional Lookmaker for Sky Italia. Classified as a VIP passenger, she was in the dining hall at the time of the impact, having dinner with the contestants of the show.

Rettondini said in an interview on January 14, two days after the wreck, "I was frozen, we all pushed towards the exit like a flock of sheep. The more the ship tilted, the harder we tried to brace our feet against the incline, which in itself made no sense. But we were panicking."

On January 16, in another interview Rettondini said, "I was lucky... I was on the ship to work... We were the luckiest...because we were in the dining hall when it all happened. And the luckiest because we then went out on deck 3, the one closest to the stern, therefore furthest from the water. While we ate dinner the ship sort of jumped backwards. We all fell, the tables overturned, there was blood almost everywhere because we cut ourselves with the crockery. We went out on deck and they immediately let us down in the lifeboats." Francesca was afraid for herself and the other passengers, "I didn't know what to do. There was no staff, but not because they didn't want to help us. They knew we were safe and went out to those in need. They were great. Instead I did not understand the attitude of the captain. In all that hubbub at one point he said over the loudspeakers that everything was under control, to go back to the booths. I don't understand anything about ships. It was my first cruise. But I didn't want to move from where I was. I told everyone, 'I'm not moving from here.' Many, on the other hand followed that advice and we never saw them again."

From the lifeboat Rettondini said, “We saw people screaming, crying, throwing themselves into the water. It was desperation. They had to decide towards the side that was inclined: either they ended up under the water or they jumped. Or they drowned or froze to death. I believe there are several bodies in the ship. The engine room, the kitchens... It was all submerged... The water was freezing..." She added, "We were well off course, close to the island. There are those who speak of a gap of 7 miles between the position we should have held and the one we were in. And there wasn't just one rock. The ship ended up between two rocks... At which point they tried to turn it around. We heard the noises pushing hard, the ship started a kind of reverse. It was the end…"

When the comparison between the Concordia tragedy, and Rettondini's film Ghost Ship was mentioned to her, Rettondini replied that Ghost Ship, "...was only fiction. Tonight was a tragic reality."

== Personal life ==
Francesca met television host Alberto Castagna in the mid-1990s, and soon began dating, despite him being married. They continued their affair until 1999, when Castagna experienced health problems and reconnected with his wife.

== Filmography ==
- La Tenerezza del Serpente ( 2026)
- Un Sindaco fuori del comune (2025)
- Soldato Sotto La luna (2022)
- Una Preghiera per Giuda (2022)
- Il Lupo Bianco (2022)
- Baci Salati (2012)
- La clessidra (2012)
- L'Apocalisse delle scimmie (2012)
- Border Line (2010)
- Nient'altro che noi (2009)
- I Cesaroni (2009)
- DeKronos - Il demone del tempo (2005)
- La talpa (2004)
- A Positive Life (2004)
- Elisa di Rivombrosa (2003)
- Cronaca Rosa (2003)
- Ghost Ship (2002)
- Valeria medico legale (2000–2002)
- Angelo il custode (2001)
- Sei Forte, Maestro (2000)
- Il Conte di Melissa (2000)
- T'amo e t'amero (1999)
- Cronaca di un ricatto (1999)
- Una donna per amico 2 (1999)
- The Dinner (1998)
- Ladre si nasce (1997)
- The Nymph (1996)
- A Cold, Cold Winter (1996)
- Una donna in fuga (1996)
- Cuori e denari (1995)
- Ragazzi della notte (1995)
