= L'insegnante balla... con tutta la classe =

1979 film by Giuliano Carnimeo

- Italian theatrical release poster
- Directed by: Giuliano Carnimeo
- Starring: Nadia Cassini
- Music by: Walter Rizzati; Gianni Ferrio
- Distributed by: Variety Distribution
- Release date: 16 March 1979
- Country: Italy
- Language: Italian

L'insegnante balla... con tutta la classe (literally The schoolteacher dances ... with the whole class) is a 1979 commedia sexy all'italiana directed by Giuliano Carnimeo. The film is the first in the "Schoolteacher" film series which does not star Edwige Fenech in the main role. It is considered the breakout title for Nadia Cassini.

== Plot ==
Italy, late 1970s. In a high school, the gym teacher Claudia Gambetti wreaks havoc with her attractiveness and particular teaching method, based on dance.

== Cast ==
- Lino Banfi as Professor Mezzoponte
- Nadia Cassini as Claudia Gambetti
- Alvaro Vitali as Anacleto
- Renzo Montagnani as Professor Martorelli
- Mario Carotenuto as Principal
- Francesca Romana Coluzzi as Russian coach
- Stefano Amato as Adamo Adami
