= Chiara e gli altri =

1989 Italian television series

- Starring: Alessandro Haber; Ottavia Piccolo
- Country of origin: Italy
- No. of seasons: 2
- No. of episodes: 26

Production
- Running time: 60 min.

Original release
- Network: Italia 1
- Release: March 29, 1989 – April 12, 1991

Chiara e gli altri is an Italian television series directed by Andrea Barzini, dealing, in a comedy key, with the problems related to divorce and child custody.

== Cast ==
- Alessandro Haber: Paolo Malfatti
- Ottavia Piccolo: Livia Malfatti
- Morena Turchi: Chiara Malfatti
- Silvia Degli Espinosa: Lucilla Malfatti
- Andrea Giovagnoni: Marco Malfatti
- Galeazzo Benti: Grandpa Italo
- Didi Perego: Grandma Lucia
- Carlo Monni: Franco

== See also ==
- List of Italian television series
