= Rosanna Banfi =

Italian actress (born 1963)

- Rosanna Banfi alongside her father Lino
- Born: Rosanna Zagaria; 10 April 1963 (age 63); Canosa di Puglia, Italy
- Occupation: Actress
- Spouse: Fabio Leoni (m. 1992)
- Children: 2
- Parents: Lino Banfi (father); Lucia Lagrasta (mother)

Rosanna Banfi (born Rosanna Zagaria on 10 April 1963) is an Italian film, television and stage actress. She is the daughter of Italian actor Lino Banfi.

== Biography ==
Banfi was born Rosanna Zagaria in Canosa di Puglia but she grew up in Rome, where she attended various schools and theater academies.

In the beginning of her career, she performed in some of her father's films.

== See also ==
- Patricia Gloria Contreras

== Sources ==
(It) Rosanna Banfi
